= Massachusetts Route 32 =

North-south state highway in Massachusetts, US

Route 32
- Route 32 highlighted in red, Route 32A highlighted in blue

Route information
- Maintained by MassDOT
- Length: 60.686 mi (97.665 km)

Major junctions
- South end: Route 32 at the Connecticut state line near Monson
- US 20 in Palmer; I-90 Toll / Mass Pike in Palmer; Route 9 in Ware; Route 122 in Barre; US 202 / Route 2 in Athol
- North end: NH 32 at the New Hampshire state line in Richmond, NH

Location
- Country: United States
- State: Massachusetts
- Counties: Hampden, Hampshire, Worcester

Highway system
- Massachusetts State Highway System; Interstate; US; State
← Route 31	→ Route 33

Massachusetts Route 32 is a state highway in the U.S. state of Massachusetts. The highway runs 60.66 miles (97.62 km) from the Connecticut state line north to the New Hampshire state line, where it continues as NH 32. Route 32 connects several towns on the eastern edge of Western Massachusetts. The highway serves Palmer in eastern Hampden County, Ware in eastern Hampshire County, and Barre and Athol in northwestern Worcester County. Route 32 intersects major east–west routes including U.S. Route 20 (US 20) and the Massachusetts Turnpike in Palmer (at I-90's exit 63, formerly exit 8), Route 9 in Ware, and US 202 and Route 2 in Athol. The highway has an alternate route, Route 32A, through Hardwick and Petersham.

== Route description ==
Route 32 begins at the Connecticut state line in the town of Monson in southeastern Hampden County, from which the highway continues south as Connecticut Route 32 toward Stafford Springs. The highway heads north as two-lane Stafford Road and immediately has an oblique grade crossing of the New England Central Railroad. Route 32 crosses the watershed divide between the Middle River and Chicopee Brook. The highway follows the rail line and intersects it south of South Monson, where the highway becomes named Main Street, and crosses over the railroad in Monson. Route 32 becomes Palmer Lower Road between the latter village and North Monson, where the highway crosses over the rail line and Chicopee Brook. The highway crosses the Quaboag River, a tributary of the Chicopee River, just east of the mouth of Chicopee Brook and enters the town of Palmer as Main Street. Route 32 turns north onto Stone Street, crosses over CSX's Boston Subdivision rail line, and intersects US 20 (Park Street).

Route 32 runs concurrently west with US 20 along Park Street to downtown Palmer, where US 20 turns south onto Thorndike Street and Route 32 turns north. The highway intersects the connector from Interstate 90 (Massachusetts Turnpike) and heads northeast along Ware Street through Palmer Center to the town of Ware in Hampshire County. Shortly after entering the town, Route 32 passes under the Massachusetts Central Railroad and crosses the Ware River. The highway follows West Street to the center of town, where the highway intersects and joins Route 9 on Main Street. The highways cross the river, pass under the railroad, and leave town on East Street. The routes diverge just west of the Hampshire–Worcester county line, with Route 9 continuing east into West Brookfield and Route 32 turning north onto Gilbertville Road. The highway crosses back and forth between Ware and the Worcester County towns of West Brookfield and New Braintree as it parallels the river and rail line north.

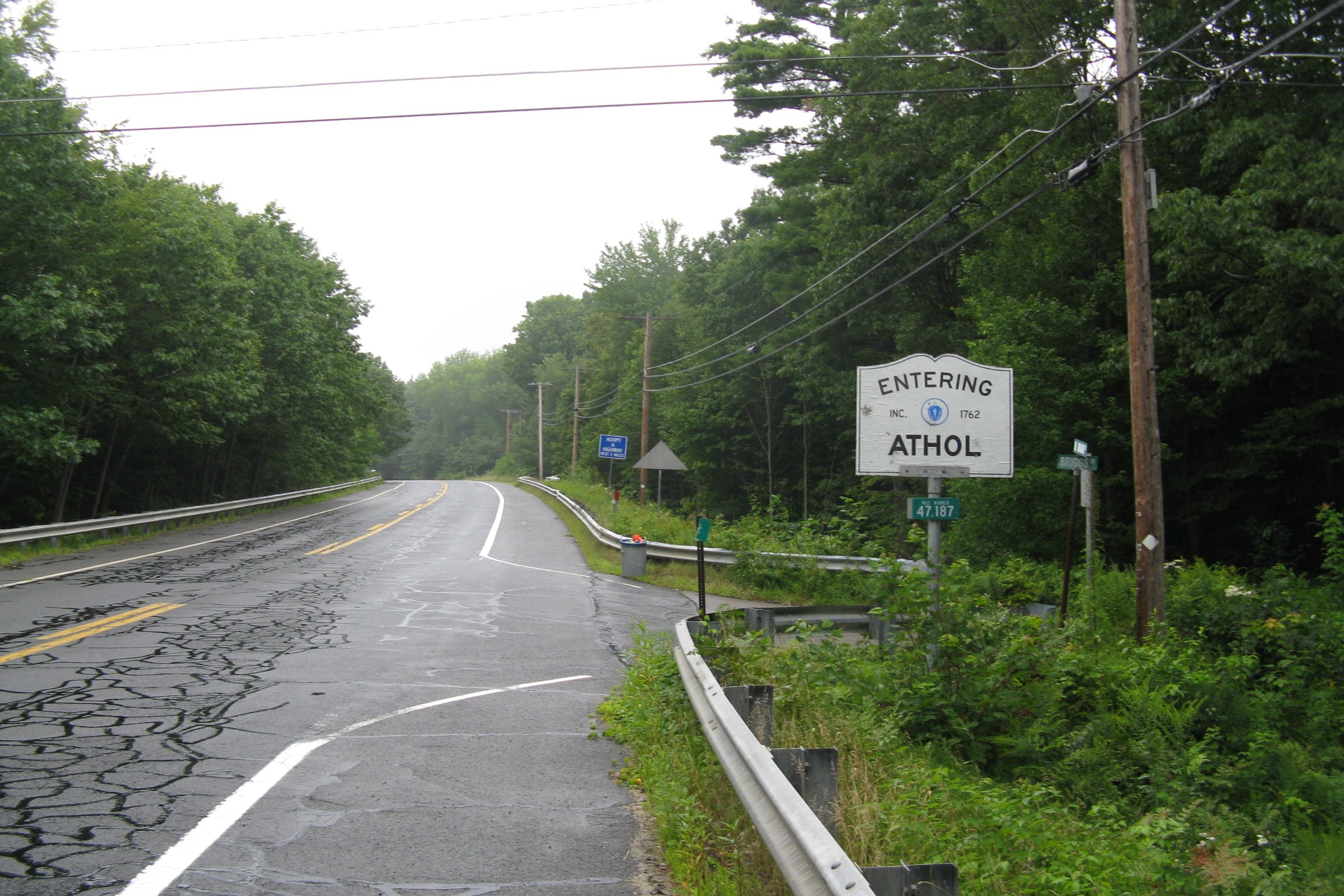
Northbound Route 32 entering Athol

Route 32 enters Worcester County for good and enters the town of Hardwick just south of Gilbertville, where the highway intersects the Massachusetts Central Railroad, crosses the Ware River, and meets the southern end of Route 32A (Hardwick Road). Route 32 exits the village on Church Street and continues northeast parallel to the rail line and river on Lower Road. The highway enters the town of Barre on Wheelwright Road. The route crosses the river and meets the northern end of Route 67 at its turn onto Main Street in the village of South Barre. Route 32 turns north again onto Barre Road and crosses the Ware River for the last time. The highway follows the Prince River to the town center of Barre, where the highway begins to run concurrently with Route 122 (Worcester Road) and meets the western end of Route 62 (Mechanic Street) at the Barre Common. Route 32 and Route 122 head west out of town on West Street, then veer north into Petersham, where they follow Barre Road. In the town center, Route 32 turns north onto Main Street while Route 122 continues on New Salem Road. The intersection serves as the northern terminus of Route 32A, which heads west concurrently with Route 122 then turns south on Hardwick Road west of the town center.

Route 32 meets the western end of Route 101 (Popple Camp Road) then has a partial cloverleaf interchange with US 202 and Route 2 shortly after entering the town of Athol on Petersham Road. The highway meets Route 2A (Templeton Road) north of the interchange; the highways head toward downtown along Main Street. Once there, Route 32 turns onto Chestnut Hill Avenue, crosses over the Pan Am Southern rail line and the Millers River, then veers onto Silver Lake Street. The highway follows the East Branch of the Tully River into the town of Royalston as Athol-Richmond Road. Route 32 intersects Route 68 (Warwick Road) before reaching its northern terminus in the northwestern corners of both Royalston and Worcester County at the New Hampshire State line. The highway continues north into Richmond and toward Keene along NH 32 (Athol Road).

== History ==

Route 32 follows much of the course of the 1920s era New England Interstate Route 32, a part of the New England road marking system that ran from Groton, Connecticut, through Palmer and Athol, to Newport, New Hampshire.

== Major intersections ==
County	Location	mi	km	Destinations	Notes
Hampden	Monson	0.000	0.000	Route 32 south – Stafford Springs	Continuation into Connecticut
Hampden	Palmer	8.791	14.148	US 20 east (Park Street) – Brimfield, Worcester	Southern end of US 20 concurrency
Hampden	Palmer	9.846	15.846	US 20 west (Thorndike Street) – Palmer Center, Springfield	Northern end of US 20 concurrency
Hampden	Palmer	10.439	16.800	I-90 Toll / Mass Pike – Springfield, Boston	Exit 63 on I-90 / Mass Pike
Hampshire	Ware	18.845	30.328	Route 9 west – Belchertown, Amherst	Southern end of Route 9 concurrency
Hampshire	Ware	20.443	32.900	Route 9 east – Spencer, Worcester	Northern end of Route 9 concurrency
Worcester	Hardwick	23.841	38.368	Route 32A north (Hardwick Road) – Petersham	Southern terminus of Route 32A
Worcester	Barre	31.386	50.511	Route 67 south (Main Street) – New Braintree, North Brookfield	Northern terminus of Route 67
Worcester	Barre	33.924	54.595	Route 122 south (Worcester Road) – Rutland, Worcester	Southern end of Route 122 concurrency
Worcester	Barre	35.060	56.424	Route 62 east (Mechanic Street) – Princeton, Sterling	Western terminus of Route 62
Worcester	Petersham	42.415	68.260	Route 122 north (New Salem Road) to Route 32A south – New Salem, Orange	Northern end of Route 122 concurrency
Worcester	Petersham	43.877	70.613	Route 101 north (Popple Camp Road) – Templeton, Gardner	Southern terminus of Route 101
Worcester	Athol	48.830	78.584	US 202 / Route 2 (Mohawk Trail) – Boston, Winchendon, Greenfield, Belchertown	Exit 75 on Route 2
Worcester	Athol	49.718	80.013	Route 2A east (Templeton Road) – Gardner	Southern end of Route 2A concurrency
Worcester	Athol	51.080	82.205	Route 2A west (Main Street) – Orange	Northern end of Route 2A concurrency
Worcester	Royalston	58.577	94.271	Route 68 south (Warwick Road) – Baldwinville, Gardner	Northern terminus of Route 68
Worcester	Royalston	60.686	97.665	NH 32 north – Keene	Continuation into New Hampshire
1.000 mi = 1.609 km; 1.000 km = 0.621 mi: Concurrency terminus; Electronic toll collection

== Auxiliary route ==
Route 32A
- Location: Hardwick–Petersham
- Length: 12.791 mi (20.585 km)

Massachusetts Route 32A is an alternate route of Route 32 in Hardwick and Petersham. The highway runs 12.791 miles (20.585 km) between intersections with Route 32 in those towns, providing a more direct route that bypasses Barre. Route 32A begins in the Hardwick village of Gilbertville. The highway heads north through the town center of Hardwick and intersects Route 122 west of the center of Petersham. Route 32A runs concurrently east with Route 122 to its northern terminus at Route 32.

Major intersections

The entire route is in Worcester County.

Location	mi	km	Destinations	Notes
Gilbertville	0.0	0.0	Route 32 – Barre, Athol, Ware	Southern terminus
Petersham	12.3	19.8	Route 122 north – Orange	Southern terminus of Route 122 concurrency
Petersham	12.8	20.6	Route 32 / Route 122 south – Barre, Worcester, Petersham	Northern terminus; northern terminus of Route 122 concurrency
1.000 mi = 1.609 km; 1.000 km = 0.621 mi
