= Massachusetts Route 2A =

Highway in Massachusetts, United States

Route 2A
- Route 2A highlighted in red

Route information
- Auxiliary route of Route 2
- Maintained by MassDOT
- Length: 98.5 mi (158.5 km)

Major junctions
- West end: I-91 / Route 2 in Greenfield
- US 5 / Route 10 in Greenfield; US 202 / Route 2 in Phillipston; I-495 in Littleton; I-95 / Route 128 in Lexington; US 3 in Arlington; US 3 / Route 16 in Cambridge; US 3 / Route 3 in Cambridge
- East end: Route 2 in Boston

Location
- Country: United States
- State: Massachusetts
- Counties: Franklin, Worcester, Middlesex, Suffolk

Highway system
- Massachusetts State Highway System; Interstate; US; State
| ← Route 2 | → US 3 |

Route 2A is a 98.5-mile-long (158.5 km) east–west state highway in Massachusetts. It exists in several sections, mainly as parts of former Route 2 that have been moved or upgraded. Route 2A runs from Greenfield in the west to Boston in the east. It formerly extended to Shelburne Falls in Buckland in the west, but as of 2007, the route terminates at Interstate 91 (I-91) in Greenfield.

== Route description ==
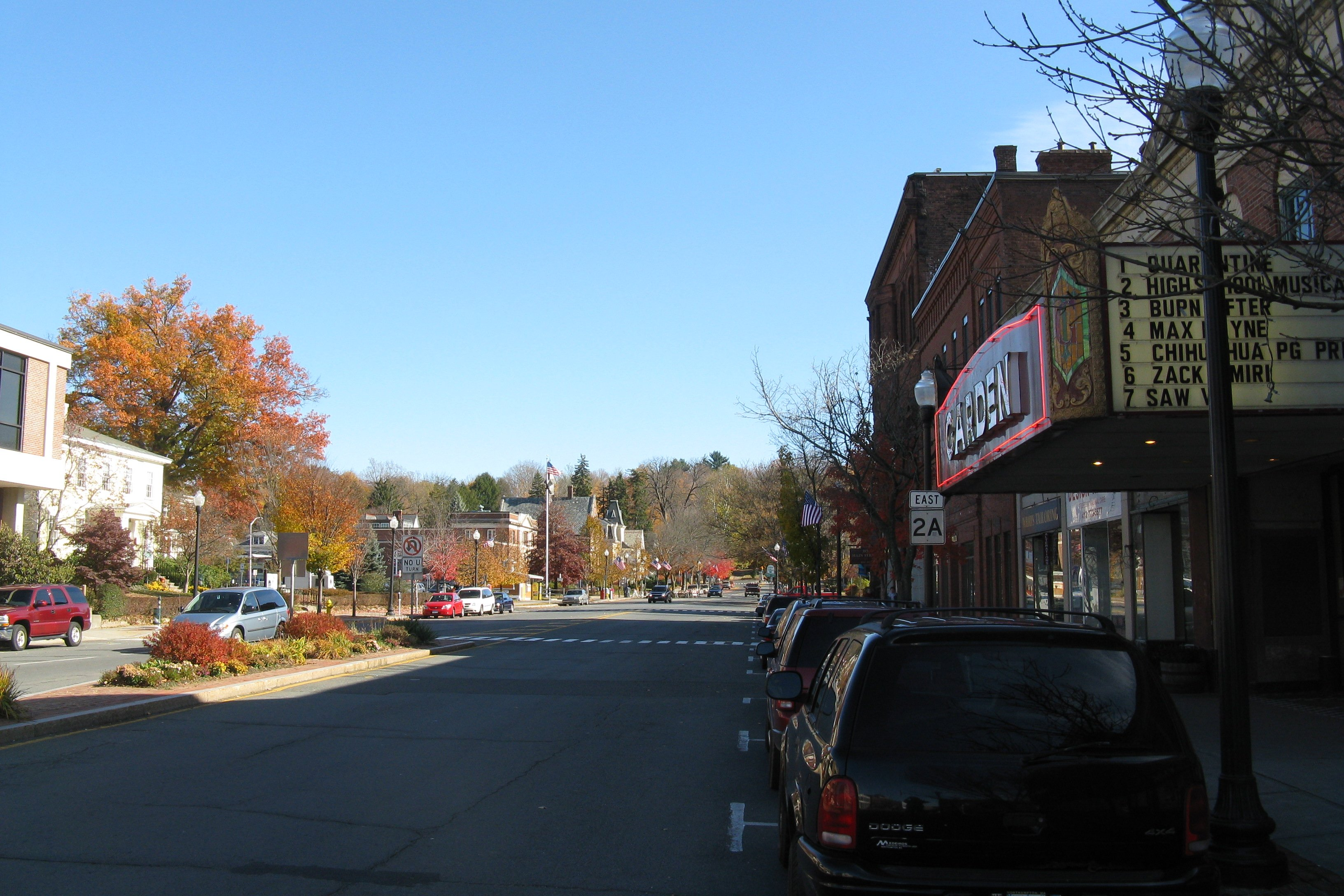
Eastbound at the Garden Theater in Greenfield

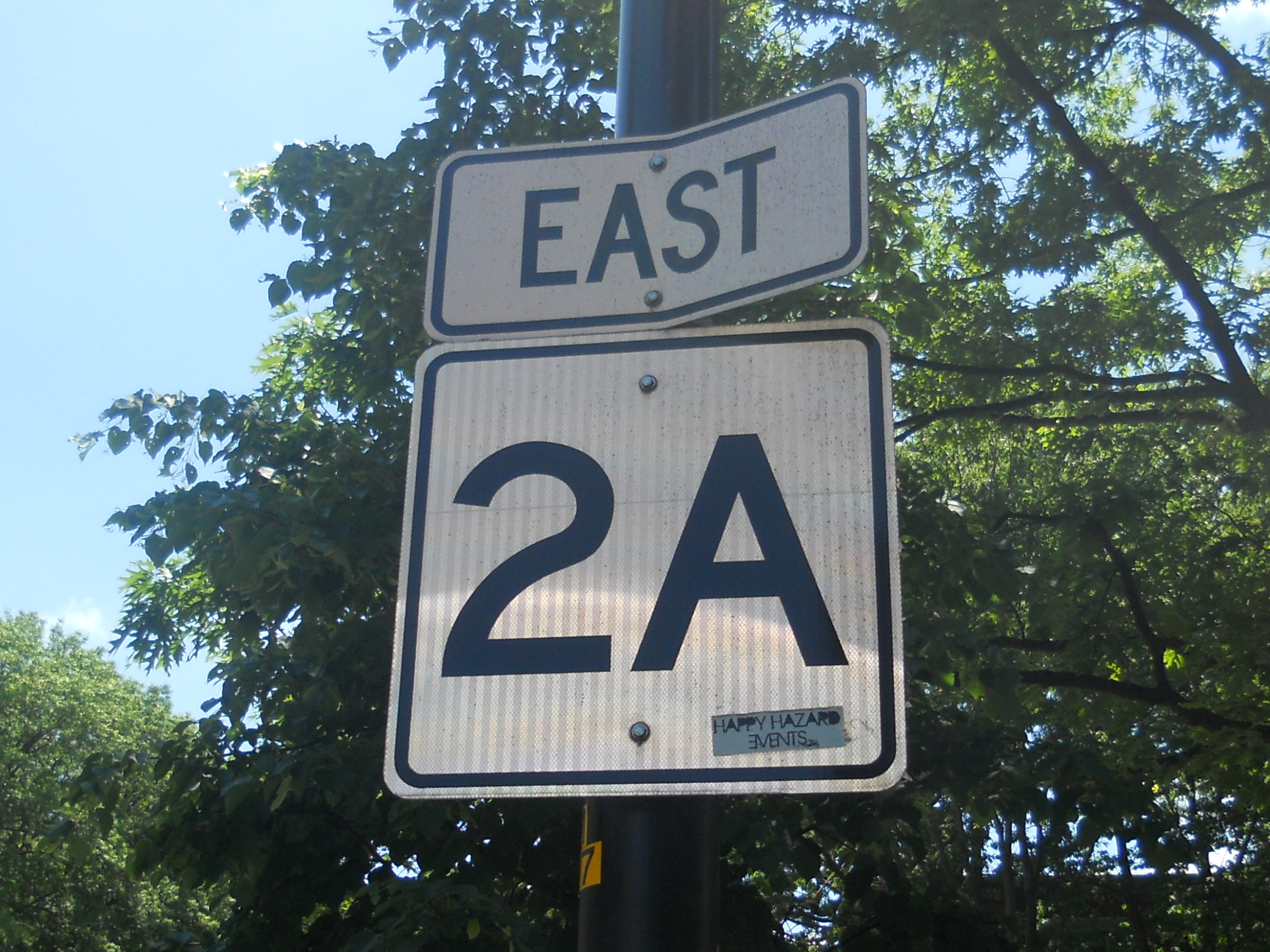
Route 2A signage on Massachusetts Avenue near MIT

=== In Franklin and Worcester counties (Greenfield – Lunenburg) ===
Route 2A begins at the rotary intersection with Route 2 at I-91 in Greenfield. It passes through downtown Greenfield before reconnecting to its parent route just west of the Greenfield-Gill town line. After a 12.6-mile (20.3 km) silent concurrency, Route 2A leaves Route 2 once more, passing through Orange and Athol. In Athol it passes the former northern terminus of Route 21, which was truncated to Belchertown after the creation of the Quabbin Reservoir. From Phillipston through Westminster, Route 2A weaves around its parent route, crossing it a total of six times with five exits of access off of Route 2. In Fitchburg the road is shared with several other routes as it passes through the northern half of town. Once in Lunenburg it has another short concurrency with Route 13 just north of the former Whalom Park before crossing into Middlesex County at Shirley.

=== In Middlesex County (Ayer – Lexington) ===
In Shirley, Route 2A passes north of Fort Devens into Ayer, heading into Littleton and crossing I-495 at exit 79 (formerly exit 30). It then turns south through Acton and into Concord before rejoining its parent route once more. As a silent concurrency, it passes south of the historic center of town and north of Walden Pond before splitting again. Route 2A then passes through the Minuteman National Historical Park just south of the Battle Road, the route taken by British troops between the Battles of Lexington and Concord. It then leaves the park, intersecting with I-95/Route 128 at exit 46 (formerly 30). The road passes south of Lexington's town center before winding into Arlington.

=== Concurrency with US 3 and eastern end (Arlington – Boston) ===
In Arlington, the road begins a concurrency with U.S. Route 3 (US 3) which eventually joins the route to Massachusetts Avenue (Mass Ave). After US 3 leaves Mass Ave at Alewife Brook Parkway, Route 2A continues through the city of Cambridge, passing by Harvard Yard and through Harvard Square. Due to the one-way circulation patterns of the square, Route 2A follows Mass Ave in the westbound direction and a combination of Massachusetts Avenue, Brattle Street, and Mt. Auburn Street in the eastbound direction before rejoining Mass Ave east of Putnam Avenue. It then passes by the Massachusetts Institute of Technology (MIT). It intersects the junction of US 3 and Route 3 at Memorial Drive before crossing the Harvard Bridge (also known as the Massachusetts Avenue Bridge) and crossing into Boston, ending at Route 2 and Commonwealth Avenue.

== Signage mistakes ==
In 2013, Route 2A signs were extended 2.2 miles (3.5 km) further into Boston through the Back Bay and South End neighborhoods along Massachusetts Avenue. This extension connected it with several additional numbered routes including the Massachusetts Turnpike (I-90) by its junction with Boylston Street, Huntington Avenue (Route 9), Columbus Avenue (Route 28), and Massachusetts Avenue Connector (which connects with I-93/US 1/Route 3 via I-93 Frontage Road) in Roxbury. Not only did neither the Massachusetts Department of Transportation (MassDOT) nor the Boston Transportation Department acknowledge that Route 2A had been extended, they denied knowing who put up the signs, indicating it was the action of an unknown organization. The Route 2A signs themselves had either wrong directional banners (signed as a north–south highway at least once north of Melnea Cass Boulevard) or are signed backwards (east going west and vice versa), as it heads in a northwesterly direction towards Commonwealth Avenue beyond Tremont Street. On February 26, Boston television station, WFXT-TV aired an investigative reporting segment showing the incorrect signs and their attempt to track down the source. In the report, Boston transportation officials admitted they had paid a private firm, Jacobs Engineering, to manufacture and put up the signs through a wayfinding improvement grant. The signage errors were caused by problems with the plans developed by Jacobs that apparently were not checked for accuracy before they were approved for installation by the city. The city said they were going to take action against the firm to recoup moneys from Jacobs, and would work to fix the signs as soon as possible. Meanwhile, a MassDOT official reiterated that the eastern terminus of Route 2A is at the intersection of Massachusetts and Commonwealth Avenue and that crews would be removing the MA 2A signs further east. In the city's defense, they stated that they do not typically manufacture, install, or maintain signage pertaining to state entities, similar to an arrangement with the Massachusetts Bay Transportation Authority relating to bus stop signage within the city.

== Major intersections ==
| County | Location | mi | km | Old exit | New exit | Destinations | Notes |
|---|---|---|---|---|---|---|---|
| Franklin | Greenfield | 0.0 | 0.0 | | | I-91 / Route 2 – North Adams, Boston, Springfield, Brattleboro, VT | Western terminus; roundabout; exit 43 on I-91 |
| Franklin | Greenfield | 1.1 | 1.8 | | | US 5 / Route 10 – Deerfield, Bernardston | Court Square |
| Franklin | Greenfield | 4.1 | 6.6 | | | Route 2 west – North Adams, Williamstown | Western end of Route 2 concurrency |
| Franklin | Gill | 8.0 | 12.9 | French King Bridge over the Connecticut River | | | |
| Franklin | Erving | 8.9 | 14.3 | | | To Route 63 – Northfield, Millers Falls | Access via Gateway Drive |
| Franklin | Erving | 9.1 | 14.6 | | | To Route 63 – Northfield, Hinsdale, NH | Access via Forest Street |
| Franklin | Erving | 16.7 | 26.9 | | | Route 2 east – Athol | Eastern end of Route 2 concurrency |
| Franklin | Orange | 18.9 | 30.4 | | | Route 78 north – Warwick, Winchester, NH | Southern terminus of Route 78 |
| Franklin | Orange | 20.2 | 32.5 | | | Route 122 south to US 202 – New Salem, Barre, Worcester | Northern terminus of Route 122 |
| Worcester | Athol | 25.2 | 40.6 | | | Route 32 north – West Royalston, Richmond, NH | Western end of Route 32 concurrency |
| Worcester | Athol | 26.6 | 42.8 | | | Route 32 south – Petersham, Barre | Eastern end of Route 32 concurrency |
| Worcester | Athol | 27.7 | 44.6 | | | US 202 south / Route 2 west – Greenfield, Belchertown | Exit 77 on Route 2 |
| Worcester | Phillipston | 28.4 | 45.7 | | | US 202 north / Route 2 east – Boston, Winchendon | Exit 77 on Route 2 |
| Worcester | Phillipston | 30.7 | 49.4 | | | US 202 south / Route 2 – Fitchburg, Boston, Greenfield, Belchertown | Western end of US 202 concurrency; exit 79 on Route 2 |
| Worcester | Templeton | 31.5 | 50.7 | | | US 202 north – Baldwinville, Winchendon | Eastern end of US 202 concurrency |
| Worcester | Templeton | 34.5 | 55.5 | | | Route 101 south – Queen Lake, Petersham, Barre | Western end of Route 101 concurrency |
| Worcester | Templeton | 35.5 | 57.1 | | | Route 2 – Fitchburg, Boston, Greenfield, North Adams | Exit 83 on Route 2 |
| Worcester | Templeton | 36.2 | 58.3 | | | Route 101 north – Gardner, Ashburnham | Eastern end of Route 101 concurrency |
| Worcester | Gardner | 38.6 | 62.1 | | | Route 68 – Hubbardston, Holden, Gardner | |
| Worcester | Westminster | 43.8 | 70.5 | | | Route 2 east / Route 140 south – Concord, Boston, Princeton, Shrewsbury | Western end of Route 140 concurrency; exit 92 on Route 2 |
| Worcester | Westminster | 44.0 | 70.8 | | | Route 2 west / Route 140 north – Athol, Greenfield, Winchendon, Rindge, NH | Eastern end of Route 140 concurrency; exit 92 on Route 2 |
| Worcester | Fitchburg | 47.7 | 76.8 | | | Route 31 south – Princeton | Western end of Route 31 concurrency |
| Worcester | Fitchburg | 48.8 | 78.5 | | | Route 12 north – Ashburnham, Keene, NH | Western end of Route 12 concurrency |
| Worcester | Fitchburg | 49.6 | 79.8 | | | Route 12 south – Leominster, Sterling | Eastern end of Route 12 concurrency |
| Worcester | Fitchburg | 50.6 | 81.4 | | | Route 31 north – Ashby, Greenville, NH | Eastern end of Route 31 concurrency |
| Worcester | Lunenburg | 53.4 | 85.9 | | | Route 13 south – Whalom, Leominster | Western end of Route 13 concurrency |
| Worcester | Lunenburg | 53.7 | 86.4 | | | Route 13 north – Townsend, Milford, NH | Eastern end of Route 13 concurrency |
| Worcester | Lunenburg | 58.0 | 93.3 | | | Route 225 east – Groton, Westford | Western terminus of Route 225 |
| Middlesex | Ayer | 63.0 | 101.4 | | | Route 111 north – Groton, Nashua, NH | Western end of Route 111 concurrency |
| Middlesex | Ayer | 64.7 | 104.1 | | | Route 111 south / Route 110 west to Route 2 – Harvard, Worcester | Eastern end of Route 111 concurrency; western end of Route 110 concurrency |
| Middlesex | Littleton | 69.2 | 111.4 | | | I-495 – Marlboro, Taunton, Lowell, Lawrence | Exit 79 on I-495 |
| Middlesex | Littleton | 69.8 | 112.3 | | | Route 110 east / Route 119 west – Lowell, Chelmsford, Groton, Townsend | Eastern end of Route 110 concurrency; western end of Route 119 concurrency |
| Middlesex | Acton | 74.8 | 120.4 | | | Route 27 – Chelmsford, Lowell, Acton | |
| Middlesex | Concord | 77.6 | 124.9 | | | Route 2 west / Route 111 north / Route 119 west – Fitchburg, West Acton | Roundabout; western end of Route 2 concurrency; eastern terminus of Route 119; southern terminus of Route 111 |
| Middlesex | Concord | | | Western end of limited-access section | | | |
| Middlesex | Concord | 78.9 | 127.0 | | | Route 62 (Main Street) – West Concord, Maynard, Bedford | At-grade intersection |
| Middlesex | Concord | 81.1 | 130.5 | | | Route 126 south (Walden Street) to Route 117 – Walden Pond, Framingham, Waltham | At-grade intersection; northern terminus of Route 126 |
| Middlesex | Concord | 82.2 | 132.3 | 50 | 125 | Route 2 east – Boston | Eastern end of Route 2 concurrency |
| Middlesex | Concord | 82.2 | 132.3 | Eastern end of limited-access section | | | |
| Middlesex | Lexington | 85.3 | 137.3 | | | Marrett Road – Minuteman Park | |
| Middlesex | Lexington | 85.6 | 137.8 | | | I-95 / Route 128 – Canton, Providence, RI, Peabody, Portsmouth, NH | Exits 46A-B on I-95 |
| Middlesex | Lexington | 88.3 | 142.1 | | | Route 4 north / Route 225 west – Lexington, Bedford | Western end of Route 4/Route 225 concurrency |
| Middlesex | Lexington | 88.4 | 142.3 | | | Route 4 south / Route 225 east – Belmont, Cambridge | Eastern end of Route 4/Route 225 concurrency |
| Middlesex | Arlington | 92.0 | 148.1 | | | US 3 north / Mystic Valley Parkway – Winchester, Lowell | Western end of US 3 concurrency |
| Middlesex | Arlington | 92.2 | 148.4 | | | Route 60 east – Medford, Malden | Western end of Route 60 concurrency |
| Middlesex | Arlington | 92.3 | 148.5 | | | Route 60 west (Mystic Street) / Massachusetts Avenue – Belmont | Eastern end of Route 60 concurrency |
| Middlesex | Cambridge | 93.7 | 150.8 | | | US 3 south / Route 16 (Alewife Brook Parkway) – Boston, Medford, Watertown | Eastern end of US 3 concurrency |
| Middlesex | Cambridge | 95.9 | 154.3 | | | Harvard Square | Route 2A passes by Harvard University |
| Middlesex | Cambridge | 97.8 | 157.4 | | | US 3 north / Route 3 south (Memorial Drive) to Route 2 – Boston | Interchange; northern terminus of Route 3; southern terminus of US 3 |
| Charles River | | | | Harvard Bridge | | | |
| Suffolk | Boston | 98.5 | 158.5 | | | Route 2 (Commonwealth Avenue) – Kenmore Square, Downtown Boston | Eastern terminus |
1.000 mi = 1.609 km; 1.000 km = 0.621 mi: Concurrency terminus; Incomplete access
