= Massachusetts Route 101 =

State highway in Worcester County, Massachusetts, US

Route 101
- Route 101 highlighted in red

Route information
- Maintained by MassDOT
- Length: 22.55 mi (36.29 km)
- Existed: c. 1939, 1954 (current alignment)–present

Major junctions
- South end: Route 32 in Petersham
- Route 2 / Route 2A in Templeton; Route 68 / Route 140 in Gardner; Route 12 in Ashburnham
- North end: Route 119 in Ashburnham

Location
- Country: United States
- State: Massachusetts
- Counties: Worcester

Highway system
- Massachusetts State Highway System; Interstate; US; State
← Route 99	→ Route 102

Route 101 is a 22.55-mile-long (36.29 km) north–south state highway in Massachusetts. Its southern terminus is at Route 32 in Petersham and its northern terminus is at Route 119 in Ashburnham. Along the way it intersects several major highways including Route 2 and Route 2A in Templeton and Route 12 in Ashburnham.

== Route description ==
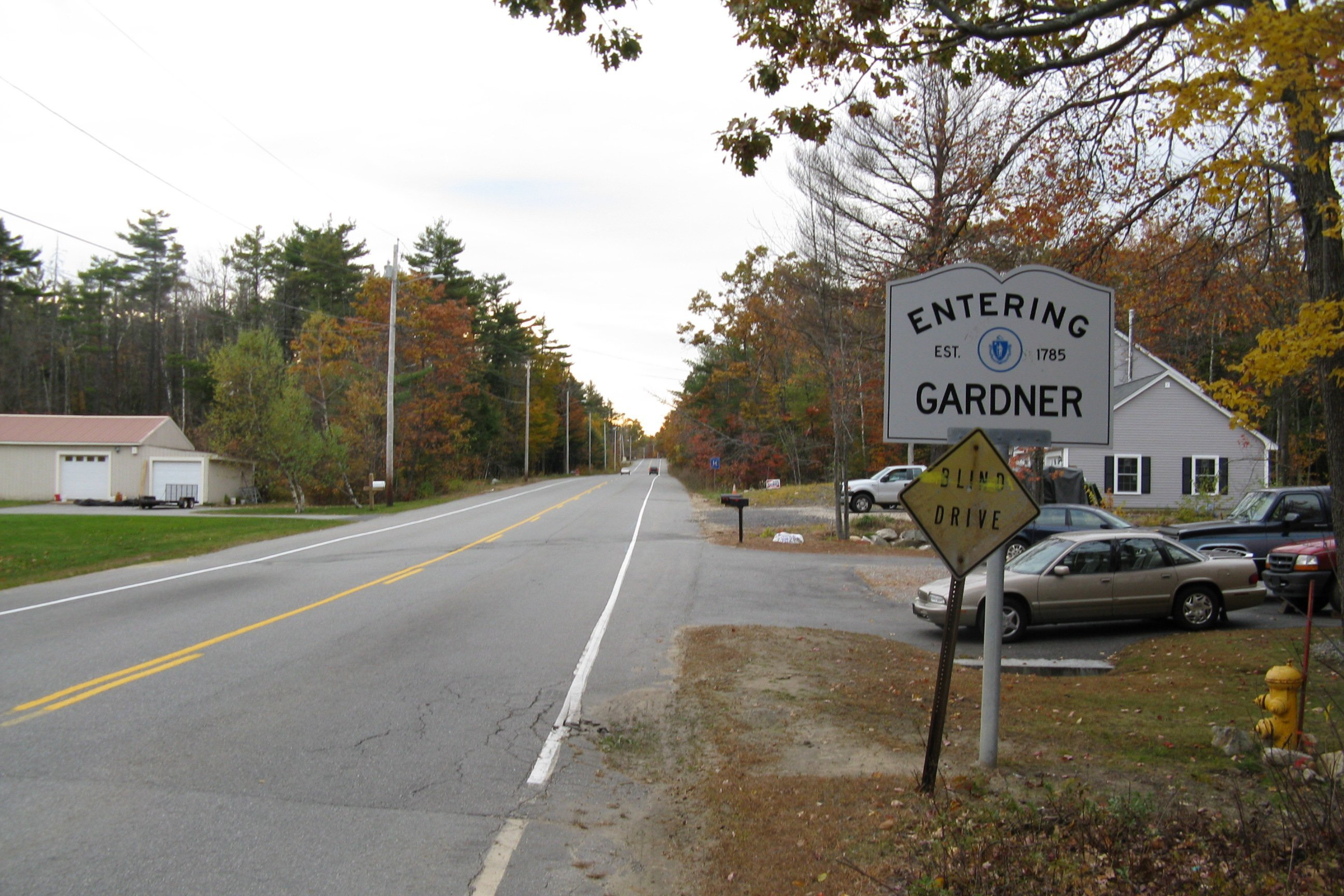
Southbound entering Gardner from Ashburnham

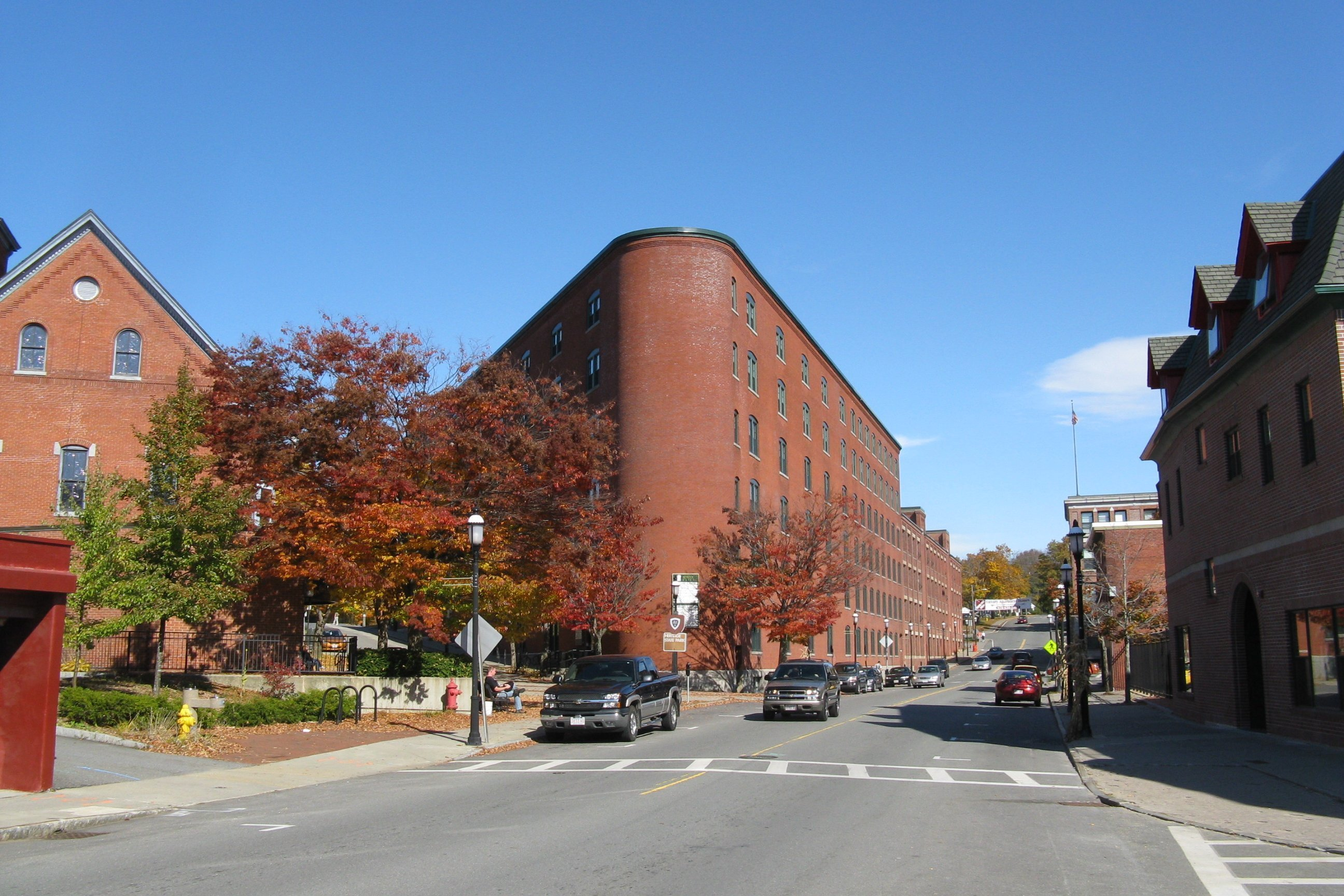
Northbound along Central Street in downtown Gardner

Route 101 begins in Petersham at Route 32, just north of the center of town. The route heads eastward, winding between two wildlife management areas and south of Queen Lake as it passes through Phillipston. In Templeton, the route joins Route 2A, passing concurrently with that route over Route 2 at Exit 83 (formerly 21) before splitting again.

From Templeton, Route 101 enters the city of Gardner, acting as one of the main streets through town. For two blocks west of Main Street, Route 101 runs concurrently with Route 68. The route crosses Route 140 before entering Ashburnham. In Ashburnham, Route 101 heads into the center of town, sharing a short concurrency along Route 12 before turning northward, passing by Winnekeag Lake and west of Ward Pond before ending at Route 119, three miles south of the New Hampshire state line and 300 yards east of the Ashby town line.

During the 1920s and early 1930s, Route 101 was a multi-state route through Massachusetts, Rhode Island, and Connecticut, primarily along the highway now known as U.S. Route 44.

== Major intersections ==
The entire route is in Worcester County.

Location	mi	km	Destinations	Notes
Petersham	0.0	0.0	Route 32 – Petersham, Barre, Athol	Southern terminus
Templeton	7.7	12.4	Route 2A west – Athol, Greenfield	Southern terminus of concurrency with Route 2A
Templeton	8.7	14.0	Route 2 – Fitchburg, Boston, Greenfield, North Adams	Exit 83 on Route 2; partial cloverleaf interchange
Templeton	9.4	15.1	Route 2A east	Northern terminus of concurrency with Route 2A
Gardner	11.6	18.7	Route 68 north – Baldwinville	Southern terminus of concurrency with Route 68
Gardner	11.8	19.0	Route 68 south to Route 2 – Hubbardston	Northern terminus of concurrency with Route 68
Gardner	12.4	20.0	To Route 140 / Green Street – Winchendon, Keene, NH, Gardner District Court	Roundabout
Gardner	14.1	22.7	Route 140 to Route 2 – Winchendon, Westminster	
Ashburnham	18.4	29.6	Route 12 – Winchendon, Fitchburg	Brief 300-foot (90 m) concurrency with Route 12
Ashburnham	22.6	36.4	Route 119 – Ashby, Townsend	Northern terminus
1.000 mi = 1.609 km; 1.000 km = 0.621 mi: Concurrency terminus
