= Massachusetts Route 2 =

State highway in Massachusetts, United States

Route 2
- Route 2 highlighted in red

Route information
- Maintained by MassDOT
- Length: 142.29 mi (228.99 km)
- Existed: 1927, 1971 (current alignment)–present

Major junctions
- West end: NY 2 at the New York state line in Williamstown
- US 7 in Williamstown; I-91 / Route 2A in Greenfield; US 5 / Route 10 in Greenfield; US 202 / Route 2A in Phillipston; Route 140 in Westminster; Route 12 / I-190 in Leominster; I-495 in Littleton; Route 27 in Acton; I-95 / Route 128 in Lexington; US 3 / Route 16 in Cambridge; US 20 in Boston
- East end: Route 28 in Boston

Location
- Country: United States
- State: Massachusetts
- Counties: Berkshire, Franklin, Worcester, Middlesex, Suffolk, Norfolk

Highway system
- Massachusetts State Highway System; Interstate; US; State
| ← Route C1 | → Route 2A |
| ← Route 6B | N.E. | → Route 8 |

Route 2 is a 142.29-mile-long (228.99 km) major east–west state highway in Massachusetts, United States. Along with Route 9 and U.S. Route 20 to the south, these highways are the main alternatives to the Massachusetts Turnpike/I-90 toll highway. Route 2 runs the entire length of the northern tier of Massachusetts, beginning at the New York border, where it connects with New York State Route 2, and ending near Boston Common in Boston. Older alignments of Route 2 are known as Route 2A.

== Route description ==
=== Berkshire and Franklin counties ===
Route 2 proceeds east from the New York state line on a winding, scenic path in Berkshire County through Williamstown, where it serves the Williams College area, and through North Adams, where it serves the Massachusetts College of Liberal Arts. East of North Adams, Route 2 ascends via a hairpin turn into the Hoosac Range along what is known as the Mohawk Trail.

Route 2 then enters Franklin County, meeting Interstate 91 at an interchange in Greenfield and briefly runs concurrently with I-91. While the old Route 2 becomes Route 2A and goes through downtown Greenfield, Route 2 joins I-91 in a short concurrency before leaving it and becoming a two-lane freeway. Outside Greenfield, Route 2A temporarily ends and merges with Route 2, and Route 2’s freeway section ends. Route 2 remains a two-lane surface road in Gill, crossing the Connecticut River into Millers Falls, where it has an interchange with Route 63. The road in Erving was routed to the north and straightened to avoid the paper mill next to the Millers River. This rerouting led to the road being shortened by less than one-tenth of a mile.

=== Orange–Cambridge ===
As the route approaches Orange, Route 2A resumes and diverges from Route 2. At this point, Route 2 again becomes a two-lane freeway. In Orange, Route 2 runs concurrently with U.S. Route 202. The road at this point enters the town of Athol in Worcester County. After its eastern interchange in Phillipston when US-202 departs to the north, Route 2 becomes a four-lane freeway, though not to Interstate standards at most points. It continues through Gardner into Fitchburg where Route 2 has several at-grade intersections with Oak Hill Road, Palmer Road, Mount Elam Road and Abbott Avenue at the intersection with Mount Elam Road, a traffic light remains in use on the eastbound side. Continuing east into Leominster, Interstate 190 splits off, heading south to Worcester.

Route 2 continues east to Middlesex County and enters Boston's outer loop at the interchange with Interstate 495 in Littleton. It continues into Acton, where Route 2 reduces its speed to 45 miles per hour, and becomes a four-lane expressway with at-grade intersections. At the Concord Rotary, a major traffic choke point, Route 2 becomes a four-lane surface road and intersects with Route 2A and the eastern terminus of Route 119 (which is concurrent with Route 2A). After the rotary, the road passes by the State Police (who have an emergency-only traffic light) and over the Assabet River. Route 2A formerly broke away from Route 2 at the next traffic light to go left into Concord but is now overlaid with Route 2, where it becomes a four-lane expressway again. At Crosby's Corner, the sixth intersection after the rotary, Route 2A exits under the highway while Route 2 veers right (but still heads east). After a signalized at-grade intersection with Bedford Road in Lincoln, the highway becomes a four-lane arterial road.

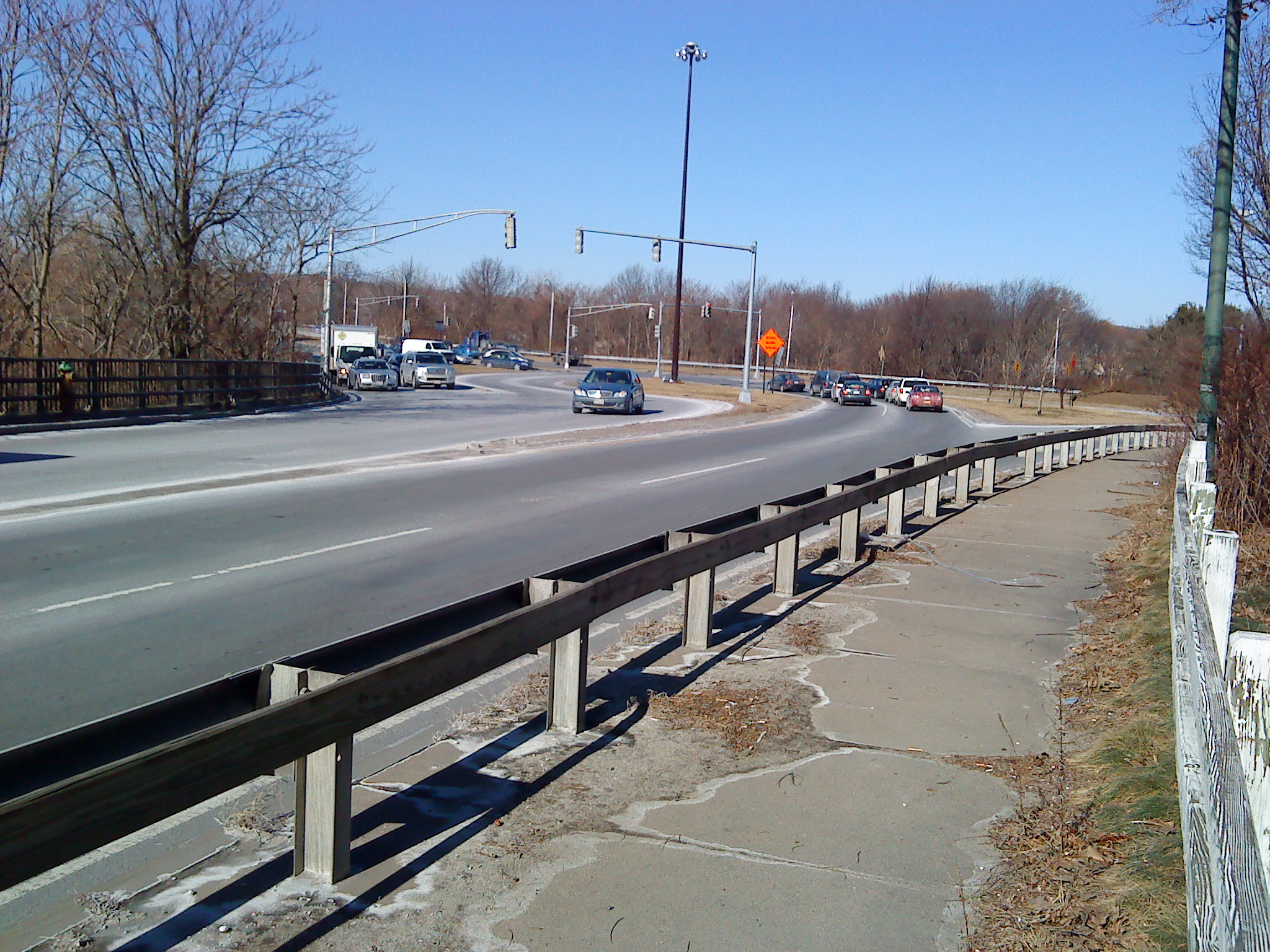
Convergence of Routes 2, 3, and 16 in Cambridge.

Route 2 enters Lexington and heads to Boston's inner belt, and as it crosses Interstate 95/Route 128, it becomes a six-lane freeway with a speed limit of 55 miles per hour. In Belmont, Route 2 remains a six-lane freeway, and then becomes an eight-lane freeway at Exit 132 in Arlington, where U.S. Route 3 would have joined it from the north. At Exit 135, the freeway narrows in width to six lanes. The section of freeway from Route 128 to the Cambridge line meets the standards of an interstate highway. The highway enters Cambridge, the highway reduces its speed limit back to 45 miles per hour and becomes a five-lane freeway (three lanes heading east, two lanes heading west), with a strip of residential and transit-oriented development on its eastbound side, including an off-ramp that serves the MBTA Alewife Station, Cambridge Discovery Park and development to the south and west of the station. After the Alewife exit, the highway narrows again to four lanes.

=== Cambridge and Boston ===
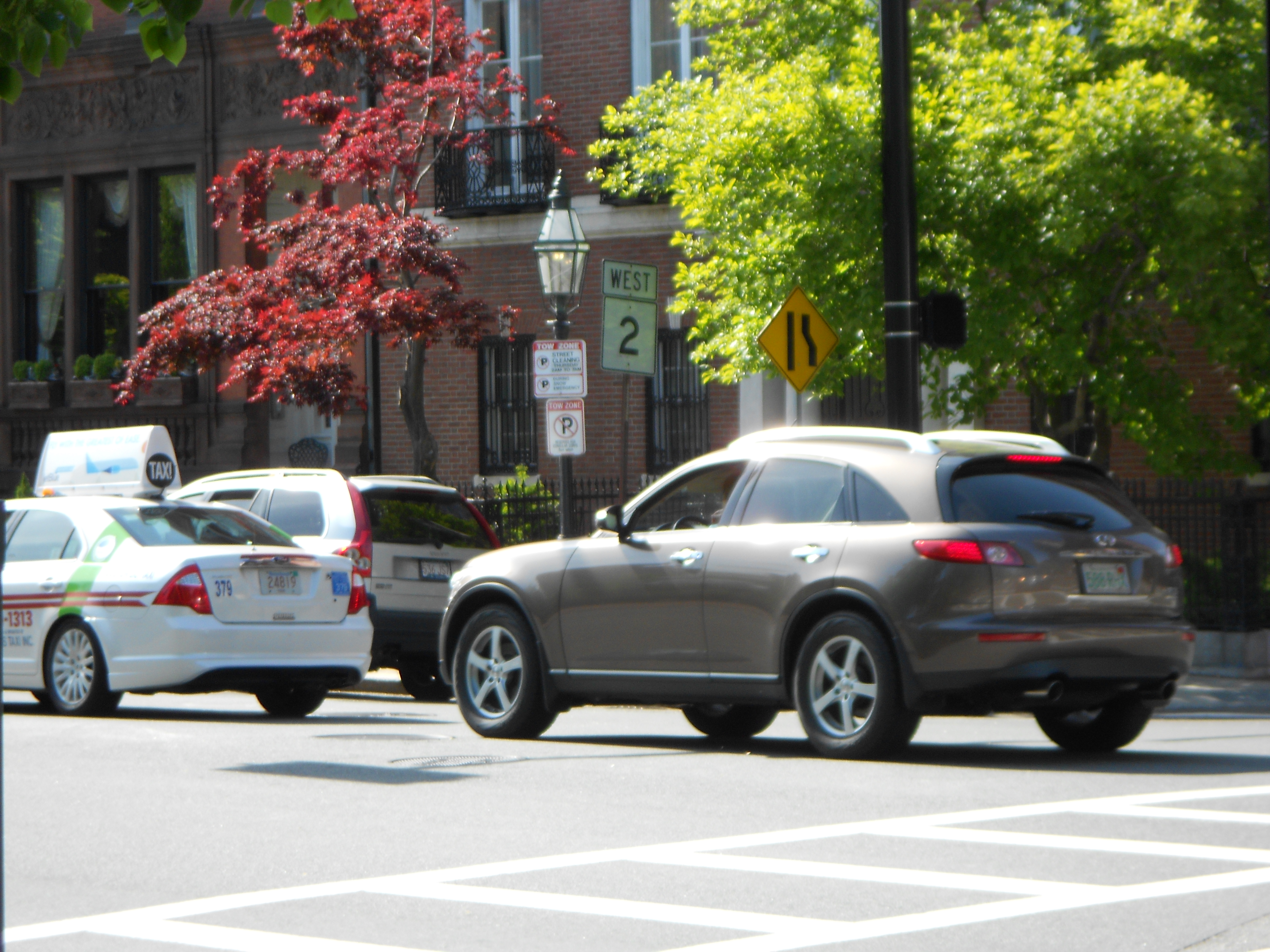
The shield for Massachusetts Route 2, located across from Boston Common

The highway then meets a large at-grade intersection with Routes 3 and 16, where Route 2 east merges with U.S. Route 3 south and Route 16 and continues as a four-lane, 35 mile per hour arterial road — managed by the Department of Conservation and Recreation — for the rest of its time in Cambridge. Route 2 follows Alewife Brook Parkway and Fresh Pond Parkway along its wrong way concurrency with Routes 3 and 16, before Route 16 heads west into Watertown. Route 2 and Route 3 concurrently start paralleling the Charles River as Memorial Drive, passing by Harvard University’s campus. It then heads southward on the Boston University Bridge into Boston proper, as it separates from Route 3. It winds through the Boston University campus as Mountfort Street and crosses over both the Massachusetts Turnpike and Commonwealth Avenue before heading due east towards Kenmore Square, while running parallel to U.S. Route 20. Immediately east of the Boston University campus, it crosses into Kenmore Square, which is also the eastern terminus of U.S. Route 20. From Kenmore Square, Route 2 follows Commonwealth Ave to Arlington St. It circles the Boston Public Garden, using Arlington, Boylston, and Charles Streets. Route 2 east goes along northbound Route 28 north at the intersection of Charles and Beacon Streets between Boston Common and the Boston Public Garden. As Route 28 north joins Storrow Drive, which shortly after would join Route 3, Route 28 south joins Route 2 and completes the loop around Boston Public Garden.

== History ==
The route amalgamates and supersedes various named highways in some cases going back to the pre-automobile era. For example, parts of Route 2 are sometimes known as the Cambridge and Concord Turnpike and the Mohawk Trail.

In the early 1920s, Route 2 was known as New England Interstate Route 7 (NE-7), a major road in the New England road marking system connecting Boston with Troy, New York. NE-7 ran roughly where Route 2A (the original surface alignment of Route 2) does now except near the New York state line. NE-7 used current Massachusetts Route 43, New York State Route 43 and New York State Route 66 to reach Troy. Current Route 2 from Williamstown to Petersburgh was previously numbered as Route 96.

Route 2 connected as a highway in its current right-of-way at Alewife Brook Parkway at some point before 1937.

An upgraded Route 2 was originally planned to continue as Boston's Northwest Expressway (merging with a re-routed U.S. Route 3 at the Arlington-Lexington or Arlington-Cambridge border) to a junction with Interstate 695, the Inner Beltway, but this, along with the Inner Beltway itself, was cancelled in 1970, accounting for the abrupt narrowing at Alewife. In place of the highway project, the MBTA Red Line was extended from Harvard to Alewife in the 1980s.

The Leominster to Ayer section opened on July 3, 1953, completing the expressway portion from Westminster to West Concord.

=== Crosby's Corner intersection ===
This major project has been planned since 1999. The intersection had an average of 90 accidents a year. The project was intended to solve the traffic and safety problems that had long occurred at the Crosby's Corner intersection (junction of Route 2 and 2A) in Concord. The project, which was expected to cost $71.9 million, widened Route 2 from Bedford Rd in Lincoln to 300 feet west of Sandy Pond Rd in Concord. The project eliminated the at grade intersection, realigned Route 2, and constructed new entrance and exit ramps along with new service roads next to Route 2.

The full project included building a new overpass bridge over Route 2 and building multiple service roads next to Route 2. Work also consisted of a new signalized intersection. The project was put out to bid for contractors on September 19, 2011. A contractor was expected to be chosen over the winter and construction was expected to begin in Spring 2012 on the estimated $55 million project.

The Army Corps of Engineers published a notice for this project, because of its impact on wetlands at Crosby's Corner. During the summer of 2012, activity on this portion of Route 2 included surveying and the installation of orange-painted stakes. Signs were added in January 2013 indicating that construction would start on January 14. As of April 2014 the project was underway and predicted completion was spring 2016. The project was completed in 2016, with a large improvement in traffic flow.

== Future ==
A project to improve the Concord Rotary, at the convergence of Route 2, Route 2A/119 (Elm Street), Barrett's Mill Road and Commonwealth Avenue, has been in planning since 2003 or even earlier. More than 61,000 cars use this rotary on a typical day, and the backed up traffic can be significant. The improved intersection would include overpasses for local streets, while Route 2 traffic would continue unimpeded at grade. However, the project was removed from the funded portion of the Boston Region Metropolitan Planning Organization's (MPO) Long Range Transportation Plan (LRTP) in August 2009 and is currently on hold.

== Major intersections ==
MassDOT was scheduled to replace the old sequential exit numbers with the new milepost-based exit numbers beginning in summer 2020, which had been delayed since 2016. On March 16, 2021, MassDOT announced that the Route 2 exit numbers would get renumbered for four weeks starting on March 23.

Route 3 south (Southeast Expressway)

| County | Location | mi | km | Old exit | New exit | Destinations | Notes |
|---|---|---|---|---|---|---|---|
| Berkshire | Williamstown | 0.000 | 0.000 | | | NY 2 west – Petersburgh, NY | Continuation into New York |
| Berkshire | Williamstown | 3.824 | 6.154 | | | US 7 south – Pittsfield | Western end of concurrency with US 7 |
| Berkshire | Williamstown | 6.221 | 10.012 | | | US 7 north – Pownal, VT, Montreal, Que | Eastern end of concurrency with US 7 |
| Berkshire | Williamstown | 6.746 | 10.857 | | | Route 43 south – Hancock, Stephentown, NY | Northern terminus of Route 43 |
| Berkshire | North Adams | 11.571 | 18.622 | | | Route 8 south – Adams | Western end of concurrency with Route 8 |
| Berkshire | North Adams | 11.740 | 18.894 | | | Route 8A south | Northern terminus of Route 8A "U" segment |
| Berkshire | North Adams | 12.405 | 19.964 | | | Route 8 north – Clarksburg, Stamford, VT | Eastern end of concurrency with Route 8 |
| Franklin | Charlemont | 29.807 | 47.970 | | | Route 8A south – Hawley, Windsor | Western end of concurrency with Route 8A |
| Franklin | Charlemont | 30.4 | 48.9 | | | Route 8A north – Heath, Jacksonville, VT | Eastern end of concurrency with Route 8A |
| Franklin | Buckland | 37.390 | 60.173 | | | Route 2A east – Shelburne Falls | Former western terminus of Route 2A |
| Franklin | Buckland | 37.806 | 60.843 | | | Route 112 south – Buckland, Ashfield | Western end of concurrency with Route 112 |
| Franklin | Shelburne | 38.062 | 61.255 | | | Route 112 north – Shelburne Falls, Colrain | Eastern end of concurrency with Route 112 |
| Franklin | Shelburne | 38.942 | 62.671 | | | Route 2A west – Shelburne Falls, Buckland | Former western end of concurrency with Route 2A |
| Franklin | Greenfield | 47.398 | 76.280 | Western end of freeway section | | | |
| Franklin | Greenfield | 47.398 | 76.280 | 26 | 43 | I-91 south / Route 2A east – Springfield, Greenfield Center | Western end of concurrency with I-91; western terminus of Route 2A |
| Franklin | Greenfield | 50.139 | 80.691 | 27 | 46 | I-91 north – Brattleboro, VT | Eastern end of concurrency with I-91; exit number not signed westbound |
| Franklin | Greenfield | 50.789 | 81.737 | | | US 5 / Route 10 – Greenfield, Bernardston | |
| Franklin | Greenfield | 51.480 | 82.849 | Eastern end of freeway section | | | |
| Franklin | Greenfield | 52.242 | 84.075 | | | Route 2A west – Greenfield Center | Western end of concurrency with Route 2A |
| Franklin | Erving | 57.1 | 91.9 | | | To Route 63 – Northfield, Millers Falls | Access via Gateway Drive |
| Franklin | Erving | 57.4 | 92.4 | | | To Route 63 – Northfield, Hinsdale, NH | Access via Forest Street |
| Franklin | Erving | 57.7 | 92.9 | | | To Route 63 – Millers Falls | Access via Prospect Street |
| Franklin | Erving | 64.865 | 104.390 | | | Route 2A east to Route 78 – Orange, Wendell | Eastern end of concurrency with Route 2A |
| Franklin | Erving | 65.060 | 104.704 | Western end of limited-access section | | | |
| Franklin | Orange | 66.571 | 107.136 | 14 | 67 | West River Street – Orange, Lake Mattawa | |
| Franklin | Orange | 69.788 | 112.313 | 15 | 70 | Route 122 – Orange Ctr, Warwick, Worcester | |
| Franklin | Orange | 70.676 | 113.742 | 16 | 71 | US 202 south / Daniel Shays Highway – Belchertown, Athol | Western end of concurrency with US 202 |
| Worcester | Athol | 75.155 | 120.950 | 17 | 75 | Route 32 – Athol, Petersham | |
| Worcester | Phillipston | 76.474 | 123.073 | 18 | 77 | Route 2A – Athol, Phillipston | |
| Worcester | Phillipston | 79.009 | 127.153 | 19 | 79 | US 202 north / Route 2A – Baldwinville, Winchendon, Phillipston | Eastern end of concurrency with US 202 |
| Worcester | Templeton | 81.915 | 131.829 | 20 | 82 | Baldwinville Road – Templeton, Baldwinville | |
| Worcester | Templeton | 83.459 | 134.314 | 21 | 83 | Route 2A / Route 101 – East Templeton, Ashburnham | |
| Worcester | Gardner | 86.500 | 139.208 | 22 | 86 | Route 68 – Gardner, Hubbardston | |
| Worcester | Gardner | 87.253 | 140.420 | 23 | 87 | Pearson Boulevard – Gardner | |
| Worcester | Westminster | 89.738 | 144.419 | 24 | 90 | Route 140 north / West Main Street – Winchendon, Westminster | Western end of concurrency with Route 140; signed as exits 90A (MA 140 south) and 90B (MA 140 north) westbound |
| Worcester | Westminster | 91.764 | 147.680 | 25 | 92 | Route 2A / Route 140 south – Westminster | Eastern end of concurrency with Route 140 |
| Worcester | Westminster | 92.568 | 148.974 | 26 | 93 | Willard Road / Village Inn Road | Eastbound exit only |
| Worcester | Westminster | 93.479 | 150.440 | 27 | 94 | Narrows Road / Depot Road | |
| Worcester | Fitchburg | 94.495 | 152.075 | 28 | 95 | Route 31 – Fitchburg, Princeton | |
| Worcester | Fitchburg–Leominster line | 96.279 | 154.946 | 29 | | Mount Elam Road | Right-in/right-out connections only |
| Worcester | Fitchburg–Leominster line | 98.007 | 157.727 | 30 | 98 | Merriam Avenue / South Street | |
| Worcester | Leominster | 99.269– 99.278 | 159.758– 159.772 | 31 | 99 | Route 12 – Fitchburg, Leominster | Signed as exits 99A (MA 12 south) and 99B (MA 12 north) westbound |
| Worcester | Leominster | 100.355 | 161.506 | 32 | 100 | Route 13 – Leominster, Lunenburg | |
| Worcester | Leominster | 101.125 | 162.745 | 33 | 101 | I-190 south / Mechanic Street – Worcester, Leominster | Northern terminus and exits 19B and 19A on I-190 |
| Worcester | Lancaster | 102.429 | 164.843 | 34 | 102 | Mechanic Street / Harvard Street | Exit partially in Leominster |
| Worcester | Lancaster | 103.497 | 166.562 | 35 | 103 | Route 70 south (Lunenburg Road) to Route 2A / Route 225 – Lancaster, Lunenburg | Northern terminus of Route 70 and to Route 2A and Route 225 via North |
| Worcester | Lancaster | 104.917 | 168.848 | 36 | 105 | Shirley Road – Shirley | |
| Worcester | Lancaster | 106.419 | 171.265 | 37 | 106 | Jackson Road – Devens, Reserve Forces Training Area | Signed as exits 106A (no public access) and 106B westbound; exit partially in Harvard |
| Worcester | Harvard | 109.348– 109.357 | 175.979– 175.993 | 38 | 109 | Route 110 / Route 111 – Harvard, Ayer | Signed as exits 109A (MA 110 south/MA 111 west) and 109B (MA 110 north/MA 111 east) |
| Middlesex | Littleton | 113.050 | 181.936 | 39 | 112 | Taylor Street – Littleton | |
| Middlesex | Littleton | 113.285– 113.317 | 182.315– 182.366 | 40 | 113 | I-495 – Marlboro, Lowell | Signed as exits 113A (I-495 south) and 113B (I-495 north); exits 78A and 78B on I-495 |
| Middlesex | Boxborough | 115.505 | 185.887 | 41 | 115 | Newtown Road – West Acton, Littleton | |
| Middlesex | Acton | 117.612 | 189.278 | 42 | 117 | Route 27 – Maynard, Acton | |
| Middlesex | Acton | 118.013 | 189.924 | 43 | 118 | Route 111 north – West Acton | Westbound left exit and eastbound entrance; western terminus of concurrency with Route 111 |
| Middlesex | Concord | 120.465 | 193.870 | Eastern end of limited-access section | | | |
| Middlesex | Concord | 120.465 | 193.870 | | | Route 2A west / Route 119 west – Littleton Route 111 ends | Rotary; western end of concurrency with Route 2A; eastern terminus of Route 119; southern terminus of Route 111 |
| Middlesex | Concord | | | Western end of limited-access section | | | |
| Middlesex | Concord | 121.691 | 195.843 | | | Route 62 (Main Street) – West Concord, Maynard, Concord Ctr, Bedford | At-grade intersection |
| Middlesex | Concord | 123.901 | 199.399 | | | Route 126 south (Walden Street) to Route 117 – Walden Pond, Waltham | At-grade intersection; northern terminus of Route 126 |
| Middlesex | Concord | 124.824 | 200.885 | 50 | 125 | Route 2A east – Concord, Lincoln | Eastern end of concurrency with Route 2A |
| Middlesex | Lincoln | 126.256 | 203.189 | 51 | | Bedford Road | At-grade intersection; to Route 2A |
| Middlesex | Lincoln | | | Eastern end of limited-access section | | | |
| Middlesex | Lexington | 128.527 | 206.844 | Western end of freeway section | | | |
| Middlesex | Lexington | 128.527 | 206.844 | 52 | 127 | I-95 / Route 128 – Attleboro, Peabody | Signed as exits 127A (I-95 south) and 127B (I-95 north); exits 45A and 45B on I-95 |
| Middlesex | Lexington | 129.010 | 207.621 | 53 | 128 | Spring Street – Lexington | No westbound exit |
| Middlesex | Lexington | 130.002 | 209.218 | 54 | 129 | Waltham Street – Lexington, Waltham | Westbound exit and eastbound entrance; signed as exits 129A (Waltham south) and 129B (Lexington north) |
| Middlesex | Lexington | 130.894 | 210.653 | 55 | 130 | Pleasant Street – Lexington | Eastbound exit and westbound entrance |
| Middlesex | Lexington | 131.435 | 211.524 | 56 | 131 | Winter Street – Belmont | No westbound exit |
| Middlesex | Lexington | 131.435 | 211.524 | 56 | 131 | Route 4 north / Route 225 west – Lexington, Bedford | No eastbound exit; southern terminus of Route 4; eastern terminus of Route 225 |
| Middlesex | Arlington–Belmont line | 131.990 | 212.417 | 57 | 132 | Dow Avenue – Arlington, Belmont | |
| Middlesex | Belmont | 132.711 | 213.578 | 58 | 133 | Park Avenue – Arlington | |
| Middlesex | Belmont–Arlington line | 133.690 | 215.153 | 59 | 134 | Route 60 – Belmont, Arlington | |
| Middlesex | Arlington–Belmont– Cambridge tripoint | 134.130 | 215.861 | 60 | 135 | Lake Street – East Arlington | |
| Middlesex | Cambridge | 134.649 | 216.697 | | | Alewife station | Eastbound exit only |
| Middlesex | Cambridge | 134.915 | 217.125 | Eastern end of freeway section | | | |
| Middlesex | Cambridge | 135.005 | 217.269 | | | US 3 north / Route 16 east (Alewife Brook Parkway) – Medford, Woburn | Western end of concurrency with US 3 / Route 16 |
| Middlesex | Cambridge | 136.354 | 219.440 | | | Route 16 west (Huron Avenue) – Watertown, West Newton | Eastern end of concurrency with Route 16 |
| Middlesex | Cambridge | 139.280 | 224.149 | | | US 3 south (Memorial Drive) | Eastern end of concurrency with US 3 |
| Charles River | | 139.349 | 224.260 | Boston University Bridge | | | |
| Suffolk | Boston | 139.531 | 224.553 | | | US 20 (Commonwealth Avenue) – Brighton, Kenmore Square | |
| Norfolk | No major junctions | | | | | | |
| Suffolk | Boston | 140.446 | 226.026 | | | US 20 west (Commonwealth Avenue) | Kenmore Square; eastern terminus of US 20 |
| Suffolk | Boston | 140.881 | 226.726 | | | Route 2A west (Massachusetts Avenue) | Eastern terminus of Route 2A |
| Suffolk | Boston | 141.556 | 227.812 | | | Route 28 south (Clarendon Street) | Eastern Terminus, One Way Southbound |
1.000 mi = 1.609 km; 1.000 km = 0.621 mi: Concurrency terminus; Incomplete access

== See also ==
- Freeway and expressway revolts
