= Rural Glen Cemetery =

Historic cemetery in Massachusetts, United States

- U.S. National Register of Historic Places
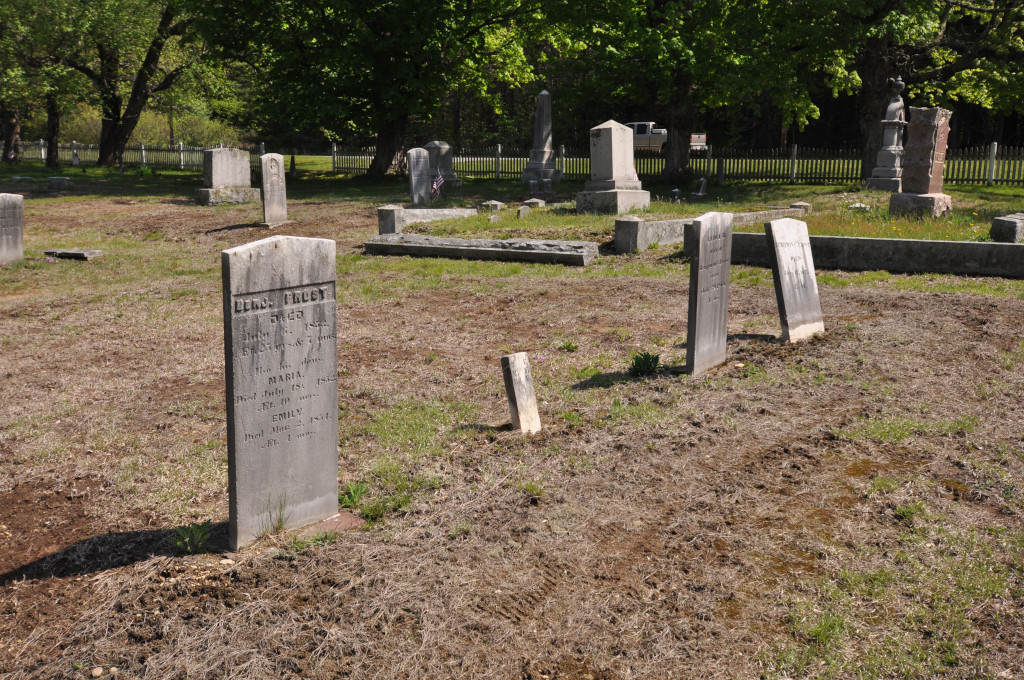

- Location within Massachusetts Location within the United States
- Location: Worcester Rd., Hubbardston, Massachusetts
- Coordinates: 42°27′55″N 71°59′54″W
- Area: 3.5 acres (1.4 ha)
- Built: 1820
- NRHP reference No.: 100005076
- Added to NRHP: September 4, 2020

Rural Glen Cemetery is a historic cemetery on Worcester Road (Massachusetts Route 68) in Hubbardston, Massachusetts. Established about 1820, it is at 3.5 acres (1.4 ha) one of the town's largest cemeteries. It was created on land formerly owned by the locally prominent Reed/Reid family, and includes the burials of some of the town's notable 19th and 20th-century residents. The cemetery was listed on the National Register of Historic Places in 2020. It is presently restricted to burials related to existing interments.

== Description and history ==
Hubbardston's Rural Glen Cemetery is located about one mile (1.6 km) south of the town center, on the west side of Worcester Road south of its junction with Old Princeton Road. It is bounded on the north and south by two other municipal cemeteries, Brookside and Evergreen cemeteries; all are identified by signage, and Rural Glen Cemetery is further differentiated from its neighbors by a picket fence along the road. It is predominantly a level grassy expanse, with trees at the fringes. The rear of the cemetery is bounded by the Ware River. Near its center is a 40-foot (12 m) flagpole flying the American flag.

The oldest burial in the cemetery is dated 1820, and is of a five-year-old child. The cemetery was formally established by a sale of land in 1875 by members of the Reed family, who have a raised and fenced plot in the south rear of the cemetery. Among the Reed family burials is that of Colonel Micajah Reed, a state representative in 1839–40. Members of the Wheeler family, whose ancestors were prominent in the town's early history, are also interred here. Among them are several generations of owners of Wheeler's store, a fixture in the town center for more than a century. The town took over management of the cemetery from a private association sometime after 1978.

== See also ==
- National Register of Historic Places listings in Worcester County, Massachusetts
