= Hubbardston Town Common Historic District =

Historic district in Massachusetts, United States

- U.S. National Register of Historic Places
- U.S. Historic district
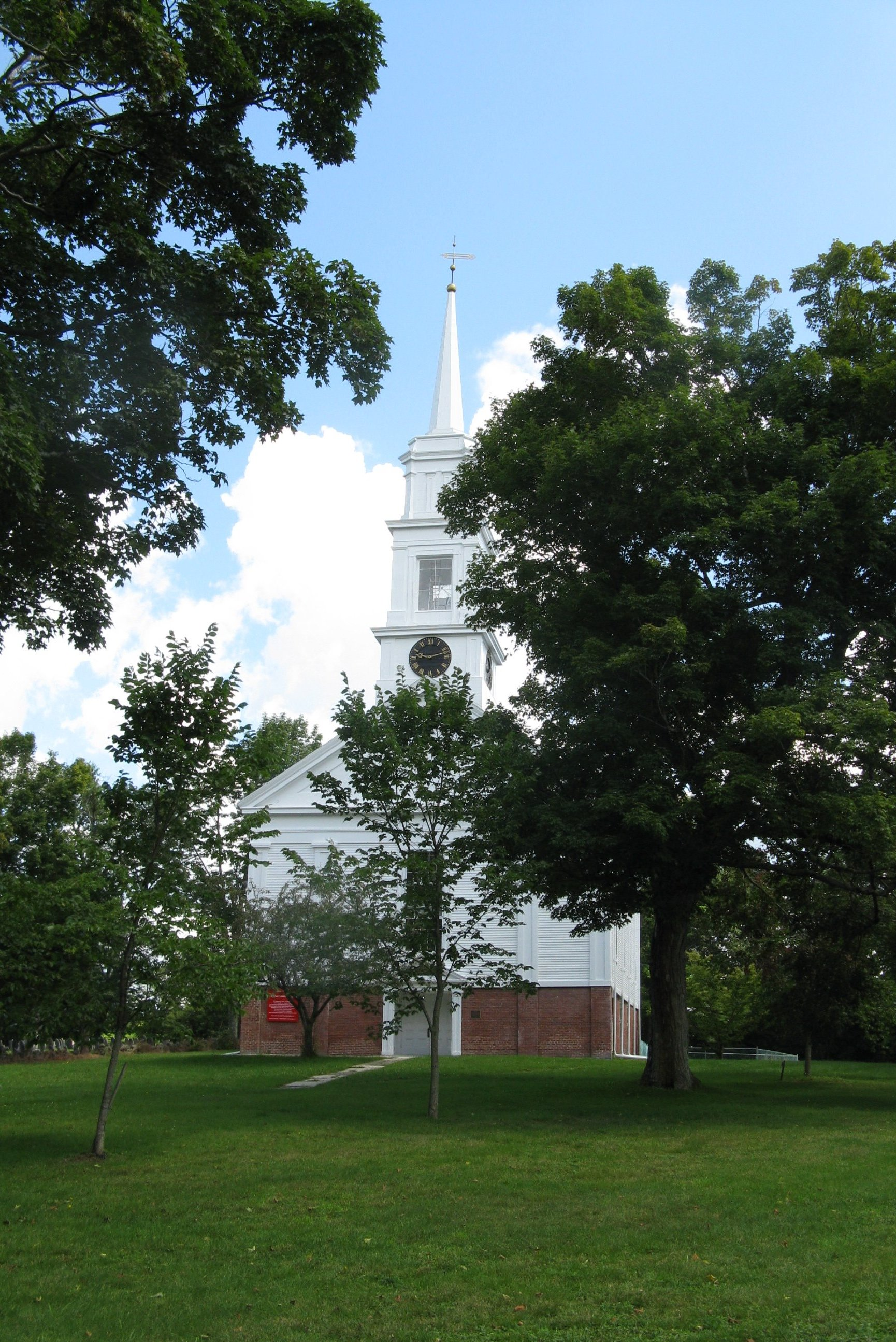
- First Parish Unitarian Church

- Location within Massachusetts Location within the United States
- Location: Hubbardston, Massachusetts
- Coordinates: 42°28′30″N 72°0′22″W
- Area: 1.2 acres (0.49 ha)
- Built: 1773
- Architect: Stowell, Abel; Fales, J.F.
- Architectural style: Greek Revival
- NRHP reference No.: 00001396
- Added to NRHP: November 22, 2000

Hubbardston Town Common Historic District encompasses the town common of Hubbardston, Massachusetts, the adjacent 1773 First Parish Church, and the town's first burying ground. It has been the center of the town's civic and religious life since its incorporation in the 1760s, and was listed on the National Register of Historic Places in 2000. The district was named as one of the 1,000 Places to Visit in Massachusetts by the Great Places in Massachusetts Commission.

== Description and history ==
The town of Hubbardston was settled in the 1760s as a district of Rutland, and was incorporated in 1767. Its town center was laid out in 1773, at what is now the junction of Main Street (Massachusetts Route 68) and Brigham Street. In that year, the burying ground was established, the common was defined, and space was laid out for a meeting house and school. The meeting house was framed in 1773, but was not actually completed until the 1790s, with later enhancements in the early 19th century, a period of significant growth in the community. In 1842, the church was essentially rebuilt in the Greek Revival style, reusing the 1773 frame of the original meeting house. This building served both civic and religious purposes for many years, hosting town meetings and elections into the 20th century.

The burying ground is located just north of the church, and is ringed by a fieldstone walls. It contains about 500 marked grave sites, generally arranged in rows facing west. The oldest marked graves date to 1777, and continued well into the 19th century. The common, located west of the church at the road junction, is studded with a variety of memorials, primarily to the town's military veterans. It also contains the foundational remnants of the town's first schoolhouse, and of a series of horse sheds that stood near the church.

== See also ==
- National Register of Historic Places listings in Worcester County, Massachusetts
