= NH 32 =

NH 32 may refer to:

- National Highway 32 (India)
- New Hampshire Route 32, United States
