= List of numbered routes in Massachusetts =

Massachusetts Routes
- Standard route markers

System information
- Notes: Routes are not always state-maintained, and not all state highways are Routes, One route enters Massachusetts that is maintained by NHDOT

Highway names
- Interstates: Route I-X or Route X
- US Highways: Route US X or Route X
- State: Route X

System links
- Massachusetts State Highway System; Interstate; US; State

In the U.S. state of Massachusetts, the highway division of the Massachusetts Department of Transportation (MassDOT) assigns and marks a system of state-numbered routes.

== List ==
| Number | Length (mi) | Length (km) | Southern or western terminus | Northern or eastern terminus | Formed | Removed | Notes |
|---|---|---|---|---|---|---|---|
| Route 1A | 95.12 | 153.08 | US 1A in Pawtucket, RI | NH 1A in Seabrook, NH | c. 1927 | current | |
| Route 2 | 142.29 | 228.99 | NY 2 in Petersburgh, NY | Route 28 in Boston | 1927 | current | Mostly follows the old New England Route 7. |
| Route 2A | 98.5 | 158.5 | I-91 / Route 2 in Greenfield | Route 2 in Boston | — | — | Mostly follows the old alignment of Route 2. |
| Route 3 | 55.70 | 89.64 | US 6 in Bourne | US 3 / Route 2A in Cambridge | 1926 | current | Southward continuation of US 3 |
| Route 3A | 97.00 | 156.11 | Route 3 in Plymouth | NH 3A in Hudson, NH | 1926 | current | Southern section is 53.39 miles; Northern section is 22.50; 21.11 miles is unsigned concurrency with Route 3 & U.S. Route 3 |
| Route 3B | — | — | — | — | 1927 | c. 1933 | Was New England Route 6B; became Route 38 by 1933. |
| Route 4 | 18.26 | 29.39 | Route 2 / Route 225 in Lexington | Route 3A in North Chelmsford | c. 1930 | current | |
| Route 5A | — | — | Suffield, CT | Springfield | 1938 | 1968 | Replaced US Route 5A; Replaced by Route 159 |
| Route 6A | 62.46 | 100.52 | US 6 in Bourne | US 6 in Provincetown | c. 1950 | current | Former US 6 |
| Route 7A | 25.30 | 40.72 | Ashley Falls Road in North Cannan, CT | US 7 / US 20 in Lenox | c. 1961 | current | Southern section is 3 miles; Northern section is 2.3 miles; 22.7 miles is unsigned concurrency with US 7 |
| Route 8 | 66.64 | 107.25 | Route 8 in Colebrook, CT | VT 8 / VT 100 in Stamford, VT | — | — | Mostly follows the old New England Route 8 |
| Route 8A | 35.85 | 57.69 | Route 8 / Route 9 in Dalton | VT 8A in Whitingham, VT | c. 1950 | current | MassHighway denotes this highway as Route 8A-L |
| Route 8A | 3.17 | 5.10 | Route 8 in North Adams | Route 2 / Route 8 in North Adams | c. 1950 | current | MassHighway denotes this highway as Route 8A-U |
| Route 9 | 135.5 | 218.1 | US 20 in Pittsfield | Route 28 in Boston | c. 1933 | current | |
| Route 9A | — | — | Route 9 in Brookline | US 20 in Boston | — | — | |
| Route 10 | 60.69 | 97.67 | US 202 / Route 10 in Granby, CT | NH 10 in Winchester, NH | 1922 | current | Mostly follows the old New England Route 10 |
| Route 11 | 4.4 | 7.1 | Route 11 in Cumberland, RI (now Route 121) | US 1 in Dedham | c. 1933 | c. 1960 | Renumbered to Route 121 in the mid 1960s, due to MA Route 1A section from Wrentham to Dedham. |
| Route 12 | 64.41 | 103.66 | Route 12 in Thompson, CT | NH 12 in Fitzwilliam, NH | 1922 | current | Mostly follows the old New England Route 12 |
| Route 13 | 14.14 | 22.76 | Route 12 in Leominster | NH 13 in Brookline, NH | 1933 | current | |
| Route 14 | 18.46 | 29.71 | Route 27 in Brockton | Route 3A in Duxbury | 1933 | current | |
| Route 15 | 0.23 | 0.37 | Route 15 in Pawtucket, RI | Route 152 in Seekonk | 1980 | current | unsigned extension of RI 15 |
| Route 15 | 7.7 | 12.4 | Route 15 in Union, CT (now Interstate 84) | I-90 in Sturbridge | 1933 | 1980 | Functionally replaced by Interstate 84 |
| Route 16 | 59.86 | 96.34 | Route 12 / Route 193 in Webster | Route 1A / Route 60 in Revere | 1933 | current | |
| Route 17 | — | — | — | — | c. 1933 | 1939 | Now part of Route 23 |
| Route 17 | — | — | Danvers | Salisbury; short segment continued as NH 17 in Seabrook | c. 1953 | c. 1959 | Section of US 1 when US 1 was temporarily rerouted onto future I-95 |
| Route 18 | 41.59 | 66.93 | US 6 in New Bedford | Route 53 in Weymouth | 1933 | current | |
| Route 19 | 16.54 | 26.62 | Route 19 in Stafford, CT | Route 9 / Route 67 in West Brookfield | c. 1932 | current | |
| Route 20A | 4.15 | 6.68 | I-91 / US 20 in Springfield | I-291 / US 20 in Springfield | — | — | |
| Route 20A | — | — | US 20 in Watertown | US 20 in Boston | — | — | |
| Route 21 | 13.73 | 22.10 | US 20 / Route 141 in Springfield | Route 9 in Belchertown | — | — | |
| Route 22 | 9.58 | 15.42 | Route 1A / Route 127 in Beverly | Route 133 in Essex | — | — | |
| Route 23 | 38.43 | 61.85 | NY 23 in Hillsdale, NY | US 20 in Russell | — | — | |
| Route 24 | 40.91 | 65.84 | Route 24 in Tiverton, RI | I-93 / US 1 in Randolph | 1951 | current | Amvets Memorial Highway / Fall River Expressway |
| Route 24 | — | — | — | — | 1933 | c. 1951 | Now Route 124 |
| Route 25 | 10.0 | 16.1 | I-195 / I-495 in Wareham | Route 28 in Bourne | 1957 | current | Freeway for its entire length |
| Route 25 | — | — | — | — | 1933 | c. 1936 | Now Route 137 |
| Route 25 | — | — | — | — | c. 1936 | 1957 | Now Route 225 |
| Route 26 | — | — | Route 2 in Fitchburg | Route 119 in Ashby | 1933 | 1939 | Became part of Route 31 |
| Route 27 | 73.44 | 118.19 | Route 106 in Kingston | Route 4 in Chelmsford | c. 1933 | current | |
| Route 28 | 151.93 | 244.51 | US 6 / Route 6A in Eastham | NH 28 in Salem, NH | 1922 | current | Longest state route in Massachusetts |
| Route 28A | 7.98 | 12.84 | Route 28 in Falmouth | Route 28 in Bourne | — | — | |
| Route 30 | 36.4 | 58.6 | Route 122 / Route 140 in Grafton | US 20 in Boston | c. 1933 | current | |
| Route 31 | 58.8 | 94.6 | Route 197 in Thompson, CT (via Dresser Hill Road) | NH 31 in Mason, NH | — | — | |
| Route 32 | 60.66 | 97.62 | Route 32 in Stafford, CT | NH 32 in Richmond, NH | — | — | Mostly follows the old New England Route 32 |
| Route 32A | 12.79 | 20.58 | Route 32 in Hardwick | Route 32 in Petersham | — | — | |
| Route 33 | 5.54 | 8.92 | Route 141 in Chicopee | Route 116 in South Hadley | c. 1946 | current | |
| Route 35 | 5.8 | 9.3 | Route 114 in Peabody | Route 97 in Topsfield | — | — | |
| Route 36 | 5.44 | 8.75 | Route 106 in Halifax | Route 14 in Pembroke | — | — | |
| Route 37 | 9.54 | 15.35 | Route 28 in Brockton | I-93 / US 1 in Braintree | — | — | Prior to 1959, Route 37 continued to Boston & ended at former Route C37 |
| Route 38 | 27.3 | 43.9 | Route 99 in Boston | NH 38 in Pelham, NH | c. 1933 | current | Formerly numbered Route 3B |
| Route 39 | 8.15 | 13.12 | Route 28 / Route 124 in Harwich | Route 28 in Orleans | — | — | |
| Route 40 | 10.46 | 16.83 | Route 119 / Route 225 in Groton | Route 3A in Chelmsford | c. 1940 | current | Designated in late 1940s |
| Route 41 | 31.2 | 50.2 | Route 41 in Salisbury, CT | US 20 in Pittsfield | c. 1932 | current | |
| Route 43 | 15.67 | 25.22 | NY 43 in Stephentown, NY | Route 2 in Williamstown | c. 1932 | current | |
| Route 45 | 6.71 | 10.80 | Route 1A in Boston | Route 16 in Revere | c. 1954 | 1958 | Renumbered to Route 145 in 1958 |
| Route 47 | 21.93 | 35.29 | Route 116 in South Hadley | Route 63 in Montague | — | — | |
| Route 49 | — | — | — | — | 1930 | 1946 | now Route 149 |
| Route 49 | 7.44 | 11.97 | US 20 in Sturbridge | Route 9 in Spencer | 1972 | current | |
| Route 52 | 11.91 | 19.17 | Route 52 in Thompson, CT | I-290 in Auburn | 1968 | 1983 | Became I-395 in 1983 |
| Route 53 | 22.14 | 35.63 | Route 3A in Kingston | Route 3A in Quincy | 1963 | current | Follows the old route of Route 3 after Route 3 was moved onto a freeway in 1963 |
| Route 56 | 20.1 | 32.3 | Route 12 in Oxford | Route 68 in Rutland | — | — | |
| Route 57 | 45.42 | 73.10 | Route 23 / Route 183 in Monterey | US 5 in Agawam | c. 1930 | current | Easternmost section of Route 57 is a freeway known as the Henry E. Bodurtha Highway |
| Route 58 | 29.86 | 48.06 | Route 28 in Rochester | Route 18 in Weymouth | — | — | |
| Route 60 | 14.33 | 23.06 | US 20 in Waltham | Route 1A / Route 16 in Revere | — | — | |
| Route 62 | 82.18 | 132.26 | Route 32 / Route 122 in Barre | Route 127 in Beverly | — | — | |
| Route 63 | 24.04 | 38.69 | Route 116 in Amherst | NH 63 in Winchester, NH | 1929 | current | |
| Route 64 | — | — | West Boylston | Gardner | c. 1933 | c. 1939 | Became part of Route 140 in 1939 |
| Route 66 | 13.65 | 21.97 | Route 112 in Huntington | Route 9 in Northampton | — | — | |
| Route 67 | 24.81 | 39.93 | US 20 in Palmer | Route 32 in Barre | 1933 | current | |
| Route 68 | 36.14 | 58.16 | Route 122A in Holden | Route 32 in Royalston | — | — | |
| Route 69 | 5.62 | 9.04 | NY 71 in Hillsdale, NY | Route 23 / Route 41 in Great Barrington | c. 1932 | c. 1939 | Renumbered to Route 71 in 1939 in order to match the New York route number |
| Route 70 | 20.78 | 33.44 | Route 9 in Worcester | Route 2 in Lancaster | — | — | |
| Route 71 | 5.62 | 9.04 | NY 71 in Hillsdale, NY | Route 23 / Route 41 in Great Barrington | c. 1939 | current | Originally numbered Route 69 until 1939 |
| Route 75 | 4.01 | 6.45 | Route 75 in Suffield, CT | Route 147 / Route 159 in Agawam | 1950 | current | |
| Route 78 | 9.73 | 15.66 | Route 2A in Orange | NH 78 in Winchester, NH | — | — | |
| Route 79 | 18.47 | 29.72 | I-195 / Route 138 in Fall River | Route 105 in Lakeville | — | — | |
| Route 80 | 6.56 | 10.56 | Carver Road (Former US 44) in Plymouth | Route 3A in Kingston | c. 1953 | current | Originally ended at US 44; until that route's relocation in 2005 |
| Route 81 | 2.61 | 4.20 | Route 81 in Tiverton, RI | I-195 in Fall River | — | — | |
| Route 83 | 8.09 | 13.02 | Route 83 in Somers, CT | I-91 / US 5 in Springfield | 1932 | current | |
| Route 85 | 21.01 | 33.81 | Route 16 in Milford | Route 117 in Bolton | — | — | |
| Route 86 | 1.40 | 2.25 | I-95 in Salisbury | NH 86 in Seabrook, NH (Now Route 286) | — | 1971 | Renumbered to Route 286 after the designation of I-86 in the 1970s, which then renumbered to I-84 in 1984 |
| Route 88 | 11.30 | 18.19 | John Reed Road in Westport | I-195 in Westport | — | — | |
| Route 93 | 9.11 | 14.66 | Route 93 in Woodstock, CT | US 20 in Charlton | 1932 | 1959 | Former Route 124; Renumbered to Route 169 in 1959 after the designated of I-93 |
| Route 96 | 3.26 | 5.25 | Route 96 in Burrillville, RI | Route 16 in Douglas | — | — | |
| Route 97 | 24.96 | 40.17 | Route 1A in Beverly | NH 97 in Salem, NH | — | — | |
| Route 98 | 3.87 | 6.23 | Route 98 in Burrillville, RI | Route 146A in Uxbridge | — | — | |
| Route 99 | 6.40 | 10.30 | Chelsea Street & New Rutherford Avenue in Boston | US 1 in Saugus | 1970 | current | Everett-to-Saugus stretch part Former US 1 |
| Route 101 | 22.55 | 36.29 | Route 32 in Petersham | Route 119 in Ashburnham | c. 1939 | current | |
| Route 101 | — | — | Route 101 in Providence, RI | Route 3 in Plymouth | 1926 | 1935 | Transferred to US 44 in 1935 |
| Route 102 | 12.33 | 19.84 | NY 22 in Canaan, NY (via NY 980D) | I-90 / US 20 in Lee | c. 1933 | current | |
| Route 102 | — | — | Route 101 in Taunton | Route 53 in Weymouth | 1926 | 1933 | Renumbered to Route 18 and Route 104 |
| Route 103 | 4.92 | 7.92 | Route 103 in Warren, RI | US 6 / Route 138 in Somerset | 1926 | current | |
| Route 104 | 12.54 | 20.18 | US 44 in Taunton | Route 106 in East Bridgewater | c. 1933 | current | |
| Route 104 | — | — | Route 140 in Clifford | Route 101 in Middleborough | 1926 | 1933 | Became an extension of Route 105 and renumbered to Route 18 |
| Route 105 | 29.36 | 47.25 | US 6 in Marion | Route 106 in Halifax | c. 1926 | current | |
| Route 106 | 34.31 | 55.22 | Route 1A in Plainville | Route 3A in Kingston | 1926 | current | |
| Route 107 | 11.9 | 19.2 | Route 16 in Revere | Route 1A in Salem | 1926 | current | |
| Route 108 | 0.91 | 1.46 | Route 110 in Haverhill | NH 108 in Plaistow, NH | — | — | |
| Route 108 | — | — | Route 12 in Fitchburg | NH 31 in Mason, NH | 1926 | 1933 | Renumbered to Route 31 in 1933 to match New Hampshire |
| Route 109 | 20.97 | 33.75 | Route 16 in Milford | VFW Parkway in Boston | 1933 | current | Formerly numbered Route 137 until 1933 |
| Route 109 | — | — | US 7 in Pittsfield | Route 19 in West Brookfield | 1926 | 1933 | Renumbered to Route 9 in 1933 |
| Route 109A | 24.49 | 39.41 | Route 8 in Hinsdale | Route 109 in Williamsburg | 1926 | c. 1933 | Renumbered to Route 143 in 1933 |
| Route 110 | 69.24 | 111.43 | Route 12 in West Boylston | US 1 / Route 1A in Salisbury | 1926 | current | Mostly paralleled by I-495 for most of its length |
| Route 110A | — | — | Amesbury | Salisbury | — | — | |
| Route 111 | 27.28 | 43.90 | Route 2 / Route 2A / Route 119 in Concord | NH 111 in Hollis, NH | 1926 | current | |
| Route 112 | 54.11 | 87.08 | US 20 in Huntington | VT 112 in Halifax, VT | c. 1926 | current | |
| Route 113 | 50.53 | 81.32 | Route 119 in Pepperell | US 1 / Route 1A in Newburyport | c. 1926 | current | |
| Route 114 | 22.42 | 36.08 | Route 28 in Lawrence | Route 129 in Marblehead | c. 1926 | current | |
| Route 114A | 3.0 | 4.8 | Route 114A in East Providence, RI | Route 114A in East Providence, RI | c. 1960 | current | Alternate route of RI Route 114 and not MA Route 114 |
| Route 115 | 10.87 | 17.49 | Route 140 in Foxborough | Route 27 in Sherborn | — | — | |
| Route 115 | — | — | Route 122 in North Grafton | US 20 in Boston | 1926 | c. 1933 | Renumbered to Route 30 in 1933 |
| Route 115A | — | — | Newton | Boston | 1926 | c. 1933 | Beacon Street OR Commonwealth Avenue |
| Route 116 | 68.26 | 109.85 | Route 20A in Springfield | Route 8 in Adams | 1926 | current | |
| Route 117 | 31.07 | 50.00 | Route 12 in Leominster | US 20 in Waltham | 1926 | current | |
| Route 118 | 16.88 | 27.17 | US 6 in Swansea | Route 123 in Attleboro | — | — | |
| Route 118 | 31.2 | 50.2 | Route 41 in Sheffield | Route 23 in Egremont | 1926 | 1932 | renumbered to Route 41 in 1932 to match Connecticut |
| Route 119 | 35.6 | 57.3 | NH 119 in New Ipswich, NH | Route 2 / Route 111 in Concord | 1922 | current | |
| Route 120 | 2.32 | 3.73 | Route 120 in Cumberland, RI | US 1 in North Attleborough | — | — | |
| Route 120 | 50 | 80 | Route 197 in Dudley | Route 2 in Fitchburg | 1926 | 1939 | became part of Route 31 |
| Route 121 | 4.4 | 7.1 | Route 121 in Cumberland, RI | Route 1A in Wrentham | c. 1960 | current | Formerly numbered Route 11 until the mid 1960s |
| Route 121 | — | — | Route 1A in Ipswich | Route 127 in Gloucester | 1926 | 1960 | became an extension of Route 133 so it could be used to renumber Route 11 |
| NH 121A | 0.0497 | 0.0800 | NH 121A in Plaistow, NH | Route 125 in Haverhill | — | — | NH Route 121A's Southern terminus partially enters Massachusetts. |
| Route 122 | 67.15 | 108.07 | Route 122 in Woonsocket, RI | Route 2A in Orange | 1926 | current | |
| Route 122A | 26.8 | 43.1 | Route 122 in Grafton | Route 122 in Rutland | 1926 | current | |
| Route 123 | 41.91 | 67.45 | Route 123 in Cumberland, RI | Route 3A in Scituate | 1926 | current | |
| Route 124 | 6.80 | 10.94 | Route 28 / Route 39 in Harwich | Route 6A in Brewster | 1951 | current | Formerly numbered Route 24 until 1951 when the Fall River Expressway was designated as Route 24 |
| Route 124 | 6.80 | 10.94 | Route 93 in Southbridge | US 20 in Charlton | 1926 | 1932 | renumbered as Route 93 in 1932 to match Connecticut (it got renumbered to Route 169 upon designation of I-93) |
| Route 125 | 18.90 | 30.42 | I-93 in Wilmington | NH 125 in Plaistow, NH | 1926 | current | |
| Route 126 | 33.57 | 54.03 | Route 126 in Woonsocket, RI | Route 2 / Route 2A in Concord | 1926 | current | Northern terminus was originally in Chelmsford |
| Route 127 | 26.70 | 42.97 | Route 1A / Route 22 in Beverly | Route 128 in Gloucester | c. 1926 | current | |
| Route 127A | 5.69 | 9.16 | Route 127 in Gloucester | Route 127 in Rockport | c. 1950 | current | |
| Route 128 | 57.8 | 93.0 | I-93 / I-95 / US 1 in Canton | Route 127A in Gloucester | c. 1926 | current | Yankee Division Highway |
| Route 128A | — | — | — | — | — | — | Sections of old MA 128 when freeway was being built |
| Route 129 | 34.08 | 54.85 | Route 4 / Route 110 in Chelmsford | Route 114 in Marblehead | c. 1920 | current | |
| Route 129A | 2.48 | 3.99 | Route 129 in Lynn | Route 129 in Lynn | 1996 | current | |
| Route 130 | 11.90 | 19.15 | Route 28 in Barnstable | Route 6A in Sandwich | 1926 | current | |
| Route 131 | 9.77 | 15.72 | US 20 in Sturbridge | Route 131 in Thompson, CT | 1923 | current | |
| Route 132 | 3.69 | 5.94 | Route 28 in Hyannis | Route 6A in West Barnstable | c. 1926 | current | |
| Route 133 | 40.87 | 65.77 | Route 38 / Route 110 in Lowell | Route 127 in Gloucester | 1926 | current | |
| Route 134 | 5.30 | 8.53 | Route 28 in South Dennis | Route 6A in Dennis | 1926 | current | |
| Route 135 | 29.53 | 47.52 | US 20 in Northborough | I-95 / Route 128 in Dedham | 1927 | current | Originally ended at Quincy before the late 1950s |
| Route 136 | 1.85 | 2.98 | Route 136 in Warren, RI | Davis Street in Rehoboth | 1927 | current | |
| Route 137 | 6.99 | 11.25 | Route 28 in Chatham | Route 6A in Brewster | 1936 | current | |
| Route 137 | 6.99 | 11.25 | Route 16 in Milford | US 1 in Dedham | 1926 | 1933 | renumbered as Route 109 in 1933 |
| Route 138 | 43.58 | 70.14 | Route 138 in Tiverton, RI | Route 28 in Milton | 1926 | current | |
| Route 139 | 32.24 | 51.89 | Route 27 / Route 138 in Stoughton | Route 14 in Duxbury | — | — | |
| Route 139 | 32.24 | 51.89 | Route 10 in Southampton | Route 21 in Belchertown | 1926 | 1935 | transferred to US 202 in 1935 |
| Route 140 | 107.76 | 173.42 | US 6 in New Bedford | Route 12 in Winchendon | 1926 | current | Southernmost 19 miles of Route 140 is a freeway known as the Alfred M. Bessette Memorial Highway or the Taunton-New Bedford Expressway |
| Route 141 | 15.9 | 25.6 | Route 10 in Easthampton | US 20 in Springfield | 1926 | current | |
| Route 141 | 12.33 | 19.84 | NY 22 in West Stockbridge | US 20 in Lee | 1926 | 1933 | renumbered as Route 102 in 1933 |
| Route 142 | 3.99 | 6.42 | Route 10 in Bernardston | VT 142 in Vernon, VT | c. 1975 | current | |
| Route 142 | 15.9 | 25.6 | Route 142 in Cumberland, RI | US 1 in Dedham | 1927 | 1933 | renumbered as Route 11 in 1933 (later renumbered to Route 121, due to MA Route 1A section from Wrentham to Dedham) |
| Route 143 | 24.49 | 39.41 | Route 8 in Hinsdale | Route 9 in Williamsburg | c. 1933 | current | Formerly numbered Route 109A |
| Route 145 | 6.71 | 10.80 | Route 1A in Boston | Route 16 in Revere | 1958 | current | Originally numbered Route 45 before 1958 |
| Route 146 | 20.99 | 33.78 | Route 146 in North Smithfield, RI | Quinsigamond Avenue / Cambridge Street / Millbury Street in Worcester | — | — | Worcester-Providence Turnpike |
| Route 146A | 4.1 | 6.6 | Route 146A in North Smithfield, RI | Route 122 in Uxbridge | 1984 | current | |
| Route 147 | 4.39 | 7.07 | Mill Street & Springfield Street in Agawam | US 5 in West Springfield | 1966 | current | |
| Route 148 | 19.68 | 31.67 | US 20 in Sturbridge | Route 122 in Oakham | — | — | |
| Route 149 | 4.83 | 7.77 | Route 28 in Marstons Mills | Route 6A in West Barnstable | 1946 | current | |
| Route 150 | 3.67 | 5.91 | Beacon Street in Amesbury | NH 150 in South Hampton, NH | c. 1933 | current | |
| Route 151 | 7.0 | 11.3 | Route 28A in Falmouth | Route 28 in Mashpee | — | — | |
| Route 152 | 14.88 | 23.95 | Route 152 in East Providence, RI | US 1 in Plainville | — | — | |
| Route 159 | 4.32 | 6.95 | Route 159 in Suffield, CT | Route 75 / Route 147 in Agawam | 1968 | current | Originally designated as US 5A in 1932 before 1968 |
| Route 168 | 1.24 | 2.00 | US 202 / Route 10 in Southwick | Route 168 in Suffield, CT | 1975 | current | Originally designated as Route 190 before 1975 |
| Route 169 | 9.11 | 14.66 | Route 169 in Woodstock, CT | US 20 in Charlton | 1959 | current | Originally numbered Route 93 until 1959 after the designation of I-93; before that was Route 124 |
| Route 177 | 4.9 | 7.9 | Route 177 in Tiverton, RI | US 6 in Westport | — | — | |
| Route 181 | 9.43 | 15.18 | US 20 in Palmer | US 202 / Route 21 in Belchertown | — | — | |
| Route 183 | 31.94 | 51.40 | Route 183 in Colebrook, CT | US 7 / US 20 in Lenox | — | — | |
| Route 186 | 2.43 | 3.91 | Route 186 in Somers, CT | Route 83 / Route 220 in East Longmeadow | 1932 | current | |
| Route 187 | 7.49 | 12.05 | Route 187 in Suffield, CT | US 20 in Westfield | 1932 | current | |
| Route 189 | 2.11 | 3.40 | Route 189 in Granby, CT | Route 57 in Granville | 1932 | current | |
| Route 190 | 1.24 | 2.00 | US 202 / Route 10 in Southwick | Route 190 in Suffield, CT (Now Route 168) | 1932 | 1975 | Renumbered to Route 168 in 1975 |
| Route 192 | 2.22 | 3.57 | Route 192 in Enfield, CT | US 5 in Longmeadow | 1932 | current | |
| Route 193 | 2.77 | 4.46 | Route 193 in Thompson, CT | Route 12 / Route 16 in Webster | 1932 | current | |
| Route 197 | 3.20 | 5.15 | Route 197 in Thompson, CT | Route 12 in Dudley | — | — | |
| Route 198 | 3.96 | 6.37 | Route 198 in Woodstock, CT | Route 131 in Southbridge | — | — | |
| Route 203 | 5.18 | 8.34 | Centre Street in Jamaica Plain | I-93 / US 1 / Route 3 / Route 3A in Dorchester | 1970 | current | established in early 1970s, was previously part of Route 3 |
| Route 204 | 1.66 | 2.67 | NY 204 in Canaan, NY (Now State Route 295) | Route 41 in Richmond | c. 1930 | c. 1938 | Became Route 295 in order to match the New York route number |
| Route 209 | — | — | — | — | — | — | Proposed MA 109 bypass from I-95 to I-495 that was never built |
| Route 213 | 3.56 | 5.73 | I-93 in Methuen | I-495 in Methuen | 1964 | current | Loop Connector |
| Route 220 | 2.17 | 3.49 | Route 220 in Enfield, CT | Route 83 / Route 186 in East Longmeadow | 1936 | current | |
| Route 225 | 31.1 | 50.1 | Route 2A in Lunenburg | Route 2 / Route 4 in Lexington | 1957 | current | Formerly numbered Route 25 prior to 1957, where the freeway segment southeast of Interstate 495 (Massachusetts) was designated as Route 25 |
| Route 228 | 9.4 | 15.1 | Route 3 in Rockland | George Washington Boulevard in Hull | 1967 | current | Originally Part of Route 128 until that route was truncated back to Braintree in 1967 |
| Route 240 | 1.3 | 2.1 | US 6 in Fairhaven | I-195 in Fairhaven | — | — | |
| Route 286 | 1.40 | 2.25 | I-95 in Salisbury | NH 286 in Seabrook, NH | 1971 | current | Formerly numbered Route 86 |
| Route 295 | 1.66 | 2.67 | NY 295 in Canaan, NY | Route 41 in Richmond | c. 1938 | current | Formerly numbered Route 204 |
| Route C1 | — | — | US 1/Route 138 in Fenway | US 1 in Saugus | c. 1933 | c. 1970 | Revere-to-Saugus segment part of current US 1 |
| Route C9 | — | — | Route 9 in Boston | Route C1/Route C37 in Boston | c. 1933 | c. 1970 | Huntington Avenue portion is part of current Route 9 |
| Route C28 | — | — | Route 3/Route 28/Route 138 in Dorchester | US 1/Route 28/Route 38 in Cambridge | c. 1933 | c. 1970 | Current Route 28 in-and-through Boston |
| Route C37 | — | — | Route 3/Route 37 in Ashmont | Route C1/Route C9 in Boston | c. 1933 | c. 1959 | |
Former

== Unnumbered state roads ==
These are state roads which, for the most part, do not carry a numbered designation. They are generally short in length and serve important roles as main roads or connections between other main roads.

| Name | Length (mi) | Length (km) | Southern or western terminus | Northern or eastern terminus | Formed | Removed | Notes |
|---|---|---|---|---|---|---|---|
| George Washington Boulevard | 3.1 | 5.0 | Hingham, Hull | | — | — | George Washington Blvd connects Route 3A in Hingham to Hull Shore Drive and Nantasket Avenue in Hull |
| John F. Kennedy Memorial Highway | 1.5 | 2.4 | New Bedford | | — | — | The JFK Memorial Highway is a semi-limited-access highway running through the city of New Bedford, from Cove St. in the south to I-195 in the north at Exit 15. The section between U.S. Route 6 and I-195 carries the initial stretch of Route 18. |
| Leominster Connector | 0.6 | 0.97 | Leominster | | — | — | Leominster Connector is a short road connecting the I-190/Route 2 interchange in Leominster with Mechanic Street. |
| Leverett Connector | 1.6 | 2.6 | Boston | | — | — | The Leverett Connector is a bypass of the Zakim Bridge from Interstate 93 north of Boston to Storrow Drive. |
| Lowell Connector | 2.88 | 4.63 | Chelmsford, Lowell | | — | — | The Lowell Connector is a freeway connection between the Northwest Expressway (US-3), I-495, and downtown Lowell. The Connector carries the unsigned designation of I-495 Business Spur. |
| Plimoth Patuxet Highway | 2.04 | 3.28 | Plymouth | | — | — | The Plimoth Patuxet Highway is a connector between Routes 3 and 3A in Plymouth, also servicing Plimoth Patuxet. Prior to 1957, this highway carried the southern portion of Route 3. |
| Boston–Providence Highway/VFW Parkway | | | Dedham | | — | — | This section starts at US 1's interchange with I-95/Route 128 (where US 1 switches to I-95/Route 128 to form a wrong-way concurrency) and continues north to the Boston line, at the intersection with Route 109. The road continues into West Roxbury as the VFW Parkway, a four-lane divided parkway carrying traffic as far as Centre Street. |
| Sandwich Road | 5.1 | 8.2 | Bourne | | — | — | Sandwich Road runs from the center of Bourne east to the Sandwich town line. East of the Sagamore Bridge, Sandwich Road carries Route 6A. |
| Soldiers Field Road | 4.3 | 6.9 | Boston | | — | — | Soldiers Field Road is a parkway, running from North Beacon Street (U.S. Route 20) in Brighton east to the Boston University Bridge (Route 2), where it continues as Storrow Drive. |
| Storrow Drive (James Jackson Storrow Memorial Drive) | 1.98 | 3.19 | Boston | | — | — | Storrow Drive is a parkway, running from Soldiers Field Road at the Boston University Bridge (Route 2) eastward to an intersection with Embankment Road (Route 28) in downtown Boston. Originally portions of Routes C1 & C9 were routed along Storrow Drive through 1970. From 1970 through 1989, U.S. Route 1 was routed along Storrow Drive. |
