= Richmond Town Hall =

Richmond Town Hall may refer to the following town halls:

- Old Town Hall, Richmond, London, England
- Richmond Town Hall, Melbourne, Victoria, Australia
- Richmond Town Hall (New Hampshire), United States
- Richmond Town Hall, North Yorkshire, England
