= Richmond Town Hall (New Hampshire) =

- U.S. National Register of Historic Places
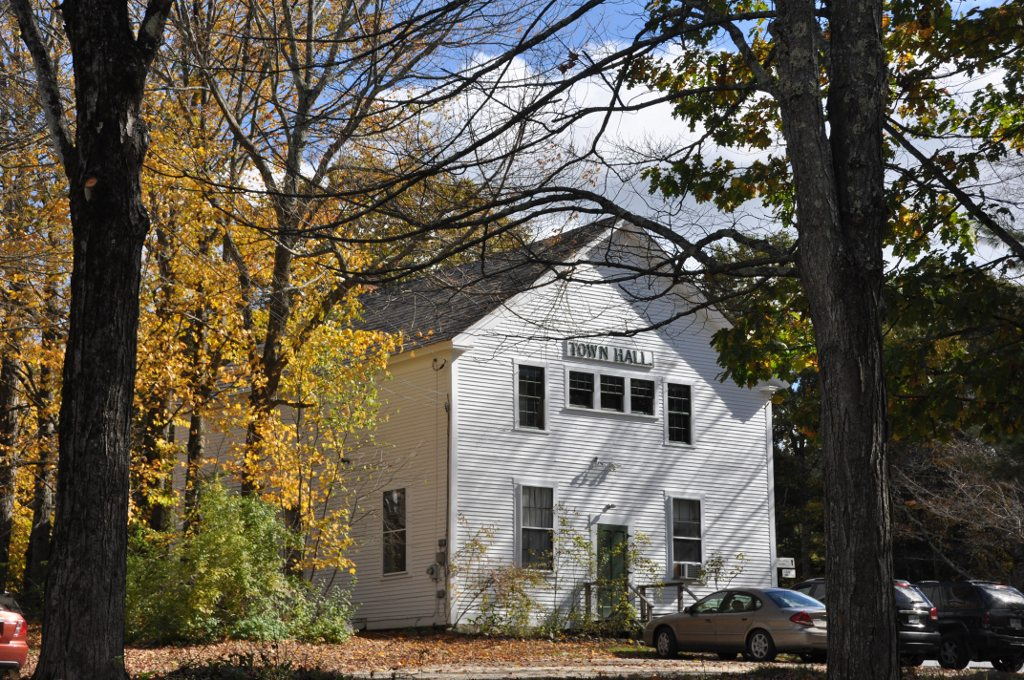

- Location within New Hampshire Location within the United States
- Location: NH 32, Richmond, New Hampshire
- Coordinates: 42°45′46″N 72°16′8″W
- Area: 2.6 acres (1.1 ha)
- Built: 1780
- Built by: Man, Hezekiah
- NRHP reference No.: 79000273
- Added to NRHP: December 19, 1979

Richmond Town Hall is the town hall of Richmond, New Hampshire, United States. Built in 1780, and originally used for both civic and religious purposes, it is one of the oldest meeting houses in the state. The building was listed on the National Register of Historic Places in 1979.

== Description and history ==
Richmond Town Hall is located north of the village center of Richmond, on the east side of New Hampshire Route 32, about 0.6 miles (0.97 km) north of its junction with New Hampshire Route 119. It is a plain white clapboarded structure measuring 30 feet (9.1 m) wide and 40 feet (12 m) long. It is a tall single story in height, with much of its interior occupied by a large auditorium with galleries. Its frame consists of large square-hewn timbers tapering from two feet square at the top to one foot at the base. These massive timbers support the king-post trusses which support the roof.

The building was constructed in 1780 to house Richmond's First Baptist Church, a congregation established in 1768 and one of the first Baptist congregations in the state. It was first used for town functions in 1782. The church became notable in the early history of Christian universalism, because Hosea Ballou, son of its first settled minister, became one of the leading proponents of that doctrine.

The First Baptist Church congregation was merged with another in 1830, ending its association with the building. Its religious trappings (pews and pulpit) were removed in 1884, at which time the rear gallery space was adapted to house town offices, and a stage was added to the auditorium in place of the pulpit.

== See also ==
- National Register of Historic Places listings in Cheshire County, New Hampshire
