= Massachusetts Route 68 =

State highway in Worcester County, Massachusetts, US

Route 68
- Route 68 highlighted in red

Route information
- Maintained by MassDOT
- Length: 36.14 mi (58.16 km)

Major junctions
- South end: Route 122A in Holden
- Route 56 in Rutland; Route 62 in Hubbardston; Route 2 in Gardner; US 202 in Templeton
- North end: Route 32 in Royalston

Location
- Country: United States
- State: Massachusetts
- Counties: Worcester

Highway system
- Massachusetts State Highway System; Interstate; US; State
← Route 67	→ Route 69

Route 68 is a 36.14-mile-long (58.16 km) south–north state highway in Massachusetts. Its southern terminus is at Route 122A in Holden and its northern terminus is at Route 32 in Royalston. Along the way it intersects Route 2 in Gardner and U.S. Route 202 (US 202) in Templeton.

== Route description ==
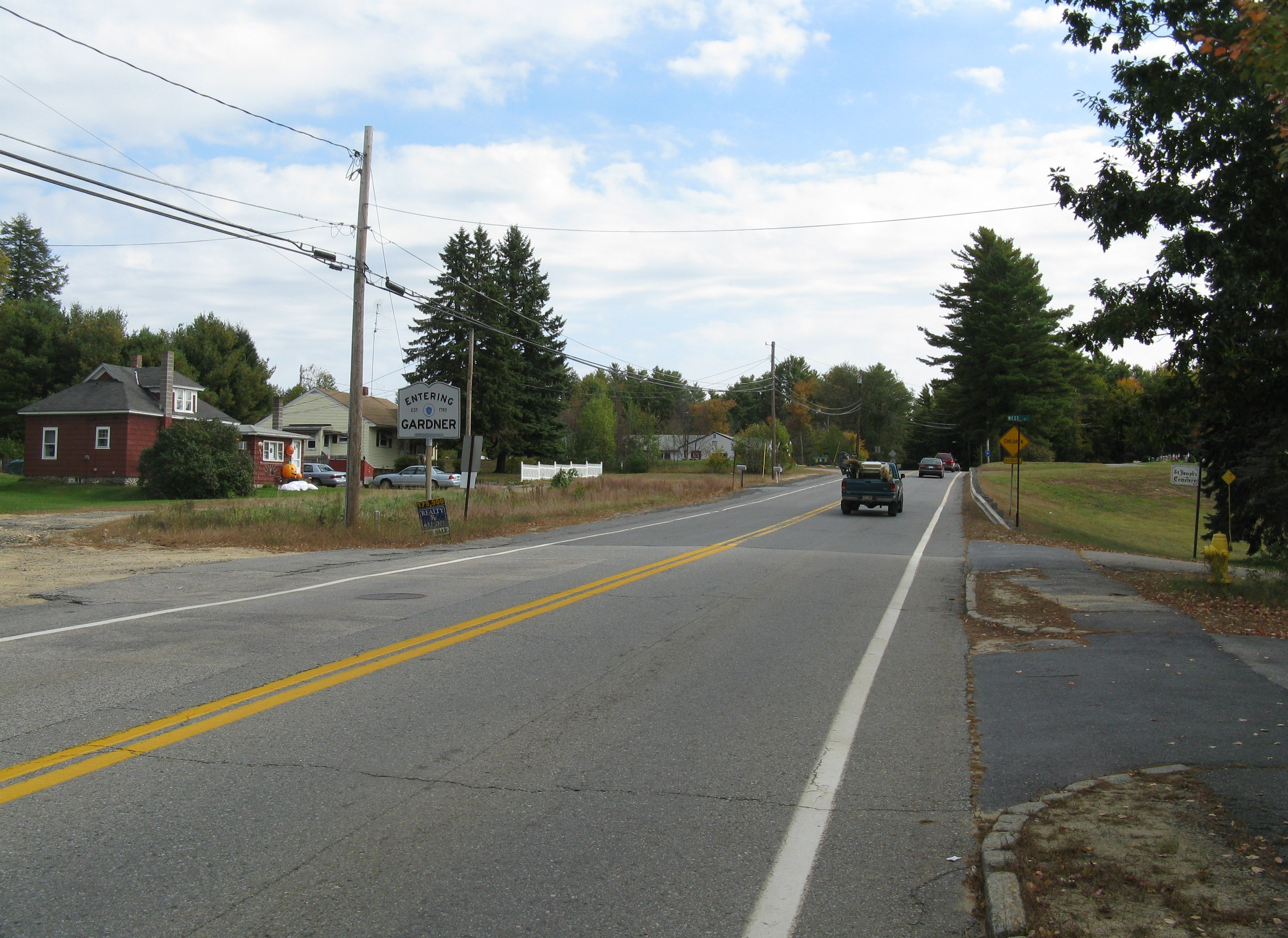
Southbound entering Gardner

Route 68 begins in the Jefferson section of the town of Holden, at Route 122A. It heads northward into Rutland, passing through the northeastern part of the town, passing the northern end of Route 56. It then heads into Hubbardston, crossing Route 62 and passing through the center of town before bending more northeasterly into the city of Gardner.

In Gardner, Route 68 crosses Route 2A and Route 2, the latter at Exit 86 (old exit 22). It heads to the center of the city and turns westward, concurrent with Route 101 for a quarter mile before turning northwestward. Route 68 heads into Templeton before joining U.S. Route 202 for a wrong-way concurrency for 1.4 miles (2.3 km) through the Baldwinville section of town, before turning northwestward again. The route passes through the far northern portion of neighboring Phillipston before entering Royalston. In Royalston, the route winds slowly through the woods and hills, crossing the Millers River and heading northward through the center of the town. It finally ends at Route 32, just two miles south of the New Hampshire state line.

== Major intersections ==
The entire route is in Worcester County.

Location	mi	km	Destinations	Notes
Holden	0.0	0.0	Route 122A – Worcester, Rutland	Southern terminus
Rutland	5.8	9.3	Route 56 south – Rutland, Paxton	Northern terminus of Route 56
Hubbardston	7.8	12.6	Route 62 – Barre, Hardwick, Princeton, Sterling	
Gardner	16.5	26.6	Route 2A – Westminster, Fitchburg, Templeton, Athol	
Gardner	16.9	27.2	Route 2 – Concord, Boston, Athol, Greenfield	Rotary interchange; exit 86 on Route 2
Gardner	17.7	28.5	Route 101 north – Ashburnham	Southern terminus of Route 101 concurrency
Gardner	17.9	28.8	Route 101 south – Templeton	Northern terminus of Route 101 concurrency
Templeton	22.4	36.0	US 202 north – Winchendon	Southern terminus of US 202 concurrency
Templeton	23.8	38.3	US 202 south – Athol	Northern terminus of US 202 concurrency
Royalston	36.14	58.16	Route 32 – Athol, Keene, NH	Northern terminus
1.000 mi = 1.609 km; 1.000 km = 0.621 mi: Concurrency terminus
