= Massachusetts Route 17 =

State highway in Massachusetts, US

Route 17

Route information
- Maintained by Massachusetts DPW
- History: 1930s in Berkshire County; 1950s in Essex County

Location
- Country: United States
- State: Massachusetts

Highway system
- Massachusetts State Highway System; Interstate; US; State
| ← Route 16 | → Route 18 |

There have been two state highways designated Route 17 in Massachusetts:

- The first Route 17 extended from Great Barrington to the New York state line in the 1930s, and was renumbered as Route 23 in 1939.
- The second Route 17 was a portion of U.S. Route 1 in the 1950s. This was due to the U.S. Highway being moved to a freeway from Danvers to Salisbury at the New Hampshire border. The former U.S. Route 1 segment was designated as Route 17 to the state line and NH 17 for a short distance into Seabrook, New Hampshire. The freeway was later designated as Interstate 95, and Route 17 and NH 17 were restored to being U.S. Route 1. The Route 17 designation was in use by June 1956 and out of use by July 1959.
