= Petersham (CDP), Massachusetts =

Petersham, Massachusetts
- Census-designated place
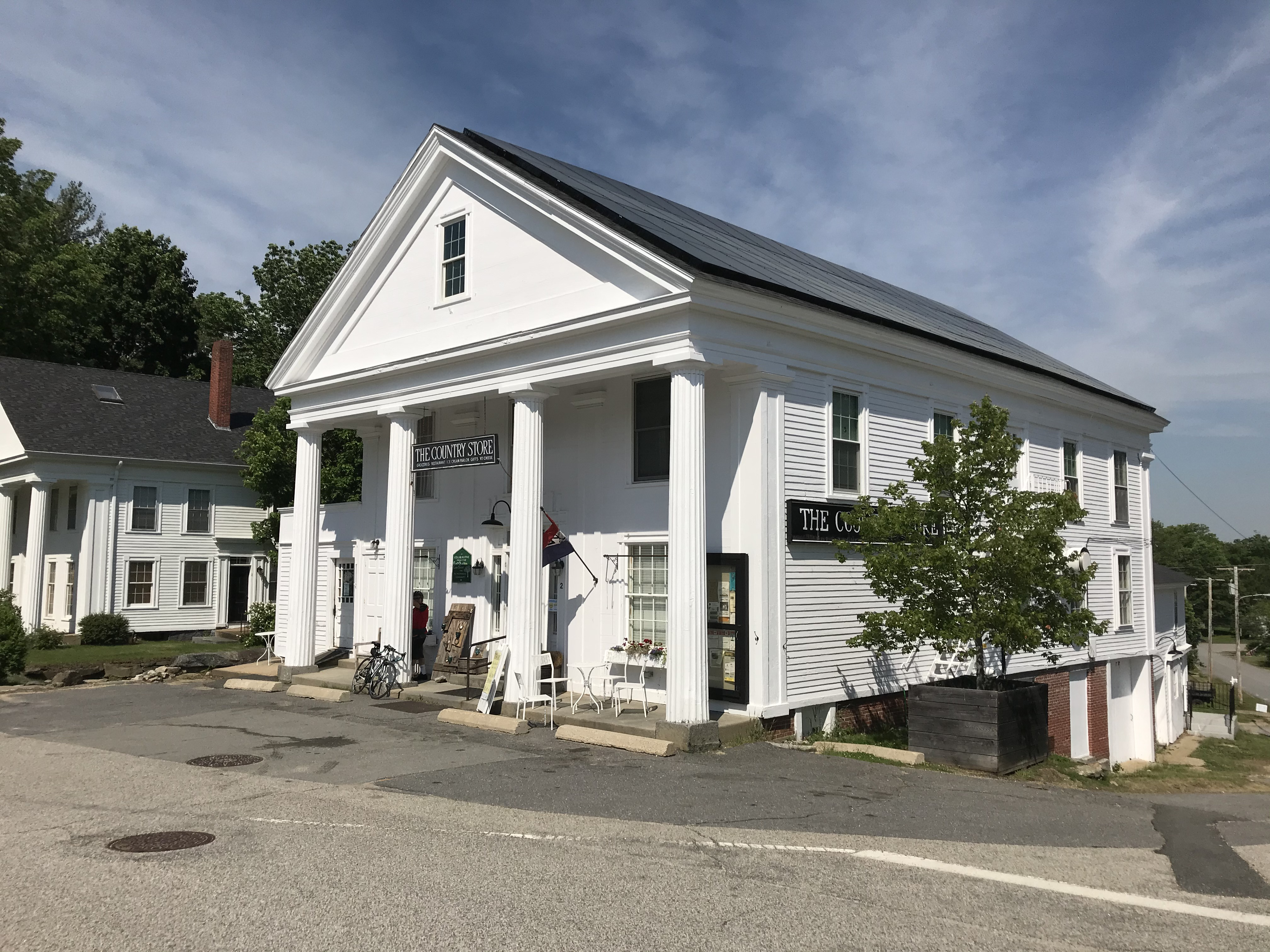
- The Country Store

- Location within Massachusetts Location within the United States
- Coordinates: 42°29′18″N 72°11′13″W
- Country: United States
- State: Massachusetts
- County: Worcester
- Town: Petersham

Area
  - Total: 1.24 sq mi (3.20 km^{2})
  - Land: 1.24 sq mi (3.20 km^{2})
  - Water: 0 sq mi (0.00 km^{2})
- Elevation: 1,096 ft (334 m)

Population (2020)
  - Total: 225
  - Density: 182.4/sq mi (70.42/km^{2})
- Time zone: UTC-5 (Eastern (EST))
  - Summer (DST): UTC-4 (EDT)
- ZIP Code: 01366
- Area codes: 351/978
- FIPS code: 25-53085
- GNIS feature ID: 2630529

Petersham is a census-designated place (CDP) comprising the main village in the town of Petersham, Worcester County, Massachusetts, United States. Massachusetts Route 32 passes through the village, leading north 9 miles (14 km) to Athol and southeast 7 miles (11 km) to Barre. Massachusetts Route 122 joins Route 32 in the village center, leading southeast with it to Barre but northwest 11 miles (18 km) to Orange.

As of the 2010 census, the population of the CDP was 243, out of 1,234 in the entire town of Petersham.

== Demographics ==
Historical population
Census	Pop.	Note	%±
2020	225		—
U.S. Decennial Census
