= Rutland (CDP), Massachusetts =

Rutland, Massachusetts
- CDP
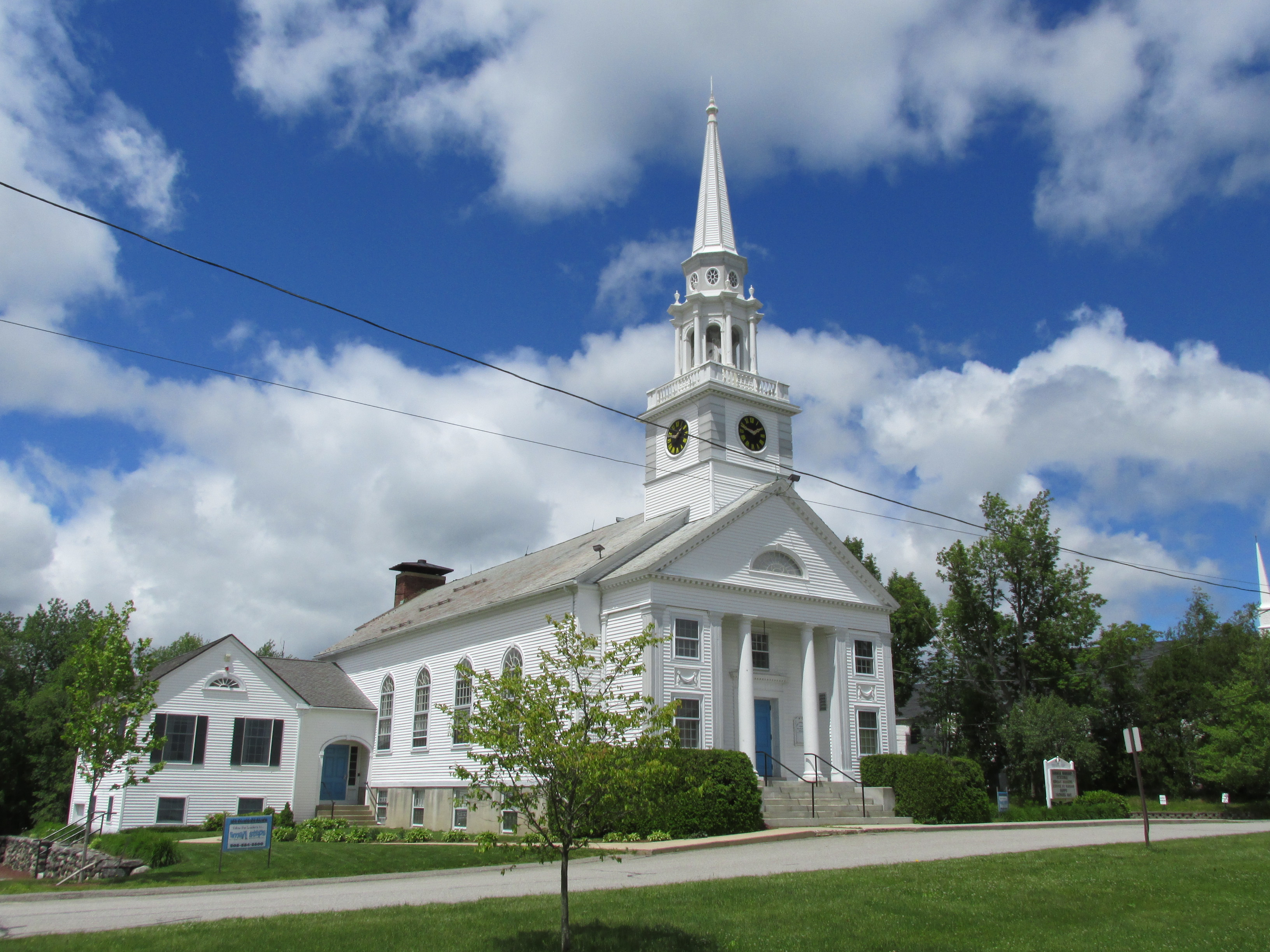
- First Congregational Church in 2013

- Location in Worcester County and the state of Massachusetts.
- Coordinates: 42°21′57″N 71°57′6″W
- Country: United States
- State: Massachusetts
- County: Worcester

Area
  - Total: 3.19 sq mi (8.27 km^{2})
  - Land: 2.96 sq mi (7.66 km^{2})
  - Water: 0.23 sq mi (0.60 km^{2})
- Elevation: 1,125 ft (343 m)

Population (2020)
  - Total: 2,179
  - Density: 736.7/sq mi (284.43/km^{2})
- Time zone: UTC-5 (Eastern (EST))
  - Summer (DST): UTC-4 (EDT)
- ZIP code: 01543
- Area code: 508
- FIPS code: 25-58790
- GNIS feature ID: 0610266

Rutland is a census-designated place (CDP) in the town of Rutland in Worcester County, Massachusetts, United States. The population was 2,111 at the 2010 census.

== Geography ==
Rutland is located at 42°21′56″N 71°57′5″W (42.365707, -71.951552).

According to the United States Census Bureau, the CDP has a total area of 8.3 km^{2} (3.2 mi^{2}), of which 7.7 km^{2} (3.0 mi^{2}) is land and 0.6 km^{2} (0.2 mi^{2}) (7.21%) is water.

== Demographics ==
Historical population
Census	Pop.	Note	%±
2020	2,179		—
U.S. Decennial Census

As of the census of 2000, there were 2,205 people, 785 households, and 579 families residing in the CDP. The population density was 287.6/km^{2} (745.7/mi^{2}). There were 846 housing units at an average density of 110.4/km^{2} (286.1/mi^{2}). The racial makeup of the CDP was 97.14% White, 1.32% Black or African American, 0.09% Asian, 0.41% from other races, and 1.04% from two or more races. Hispanic or Latino of any race were 1.27% of the population.

There were 785 households, out of which 36.7% had children under the age of 18 living with them, 62.2% were married couples living together, 9.4% had a female householder with no husband present, and 26.2% were non-families. 21.5% of all households were made up of individuals, and 6.8% had someone living alone who was 65 years of age or older. The average household size was 2.66 and the average family size was 3.13.

In the CDP, the population was spread out, with 29.3% under the age of 18, 6.9% from 18 to 24, 29.8% from 25 to 44, 24.9% from 45 to 64, and 9.1% who were 65 years of age or older. The median age was 36 years. For every 100 females, there were 99.4 males. For every 100 females age 18 and over, there were 93.5 males.

The median income for a household in the CDP was $62,287, and the median income for a family was $66,950. Males had a median income of $44,559 versus $35,319 for females. The per capita income for the CDP was $21,792. About 0.9% of families and 3.8% of the population were below the poverty line, including 1.4% of those under age 18 and 7.9% of those age 65 or over.
