= New Hampshire Route 32 =

State highway in Cheshire County, New Hampshire, US

New Hampshire Route 32
- Map of Cheshire County in southwestern New Hampshire with NH 32 highlighted in red

Route information
- Maintained by NHDOT
- Length: 14.139 mi (22.755 km)

Major junctions
- South end: Route 32 at the Massachusetts state line near Richmond
- NH 119 in Richmond
- North end: NH 12 in Keene

Location
- Country: United States
- State: New Hampshire
- Counties: Cheshire

Highway system
- New Hampshire Highway System; Interstate; US; State; Turnpikes
← NH 31	→ NH 33

New Hampshire Route 32 (NH 32) is a state highway in the U.S. state of New Hampshire. The highway runs 14.139 miles (22.755 km) from the Massachusetts state line north to NH 12 in Keene. NH 32 connects the southern Cheshire County towns of Richmond and Swanzey with Keene and Athol, Massachusetts.

== Route description ==
NH 32 begins at the Massachusetts state line in the town of Richmond. The highway continues south as Massachusetts Route 32 (Richmond-Athol Road), which heads through Royalston toward Athol. NH 32 heads north as two-lane Athol Road to the center of Richmond, where the highway intersects NH 119 (Winchester Road/Fitzwilliam Road). The highway continues north as Old Homestead Highway, which enters the valley of the South Branch of the Ashuelot River as the route enters the town of Swanzey. NH 32 passes near the village of East Swanzey, through Swanzey proper, and then North Swanzey after entering the valley of the main stem of the river. In North Swanzey, the highway passes Dillant–Hopkins Airport. NH 32 enters the city of Keene immediately before it reaches its northern terminus at NH 12 (Main Street).

== Junction list ==
The entire route is in Cheshire County.

Location	mi	km	Destinations	Notes
Richmond	0.000	0.000	Route 32 south – Athol	Continuation into Massachusetts
Richmond	2.387	3.842	NH 119 – Winchester, Fitzwilliam	
Keene	14.139	22.755	NH 12 to NH 101 / NH 10 / NH 9 – Keene, Troy	Northern terminus
1.000 mi = 1.609 km; 1.000 km = 0.621 mi
