= Orange (CDP), Massachusetts =

Orange, Massachusetts
- Census-designated place
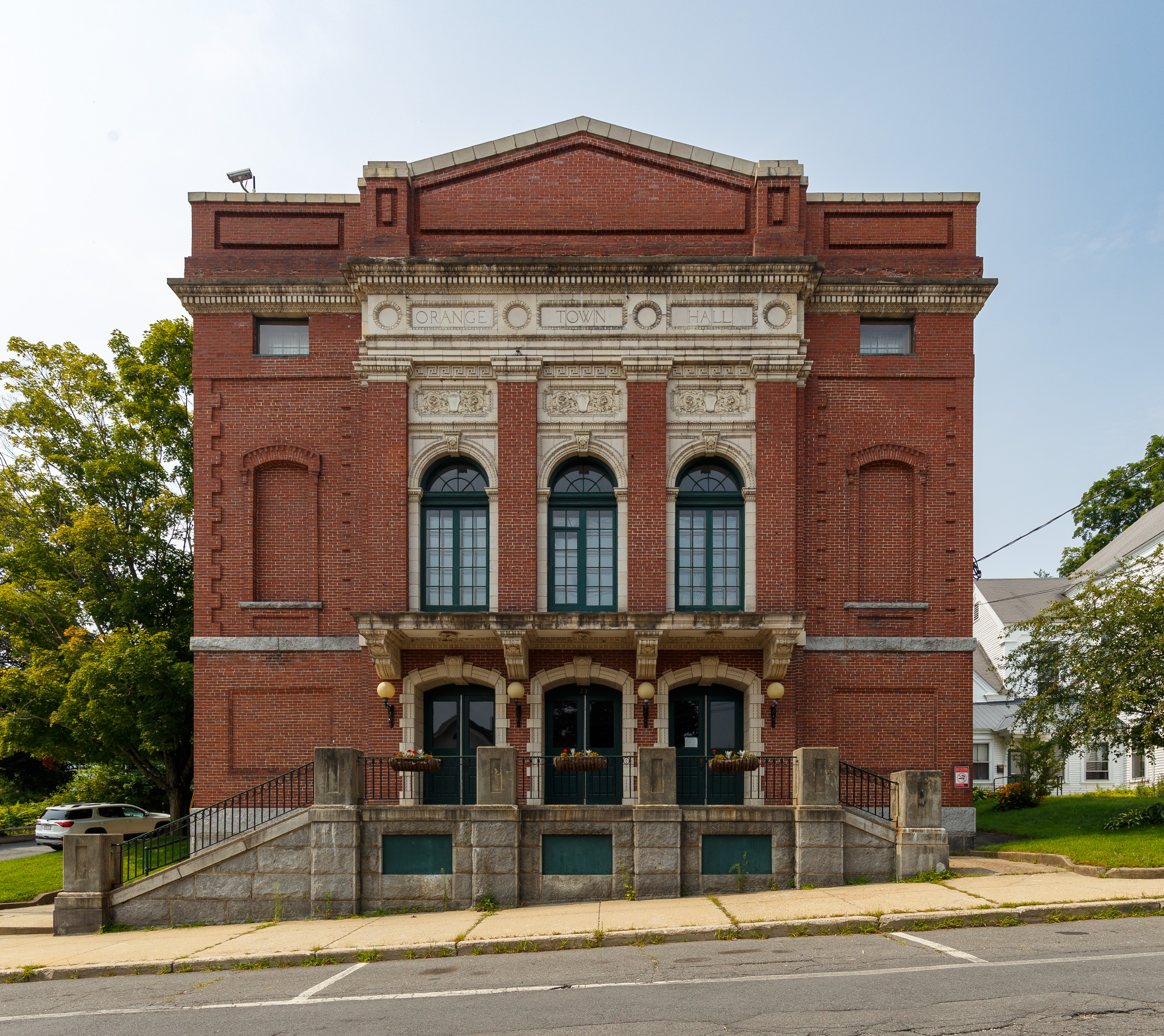
- Town Hall

- Location in Franklin County in Massachusetts
- Coordinates: 42°35′16″N 72°18′29″W
- Country: United States
- State: Massachusetts
- County: Franklin
- Town: Orange

Area
  - Total: 6.06 sq mi (15.69 km^{2})
  - Land: 5.99 sq mi (15.52 km^{2})
  - Water: 0.066 sq mi (0.17 km^{2})
- Elevation: 525 ft (160 m)

Population (2020)
  - Total: 3,636
  - Density: 606.8/sq mi (234.28/km^{2})
- Time zone: UTC-5 (Eastern (EST))
  - Summer (DST): UTC-4 (EDT)
- ZIP Code: 01364
- Area code: 978
- FIPS code: 25-51230
- GNIS feature ID: 0609456

Orange is a census-designated place (CDP) in the town of Orange in Franklin County, Massachusetts, United States. The population was 4,018 at the 2010 census. It is part of the Springfield, Massachusetts Metropolitan Statistical Area.

== Geography ==
Orange is located at 42°35′16″N 72°18′29″W (42.587796, -72.308163).

According to the United States Census Bureau, the CDP has a total area of 15.6 km^{2} (6.0 mi^{2}), of which 15.5 km^{2} (6.0 mi^{2}) is land and 0.17% is water.

== Demographics ==
Historical population
Census	Pop.	Note	%±
2020	3,636		—
U.S. Decennial Census

As of the 2000 census, there were 3,945 people, 1,545 households, and 999 families residing in the CDP. The population density was 253.9/km^{2} (657.3/mi^{2}). There were 1,663 housing units at an average density of 107.0/km^{2} (277.1/mi^{2}). The racial makeup of the CDP was 95.87% White, 1.22% Black or African American, 0.25% Native American, 0.61% Asian, 0.03% Pacific Islander, 0.58% from other races, and 1.44% from two or more races. Hispanic or Latino of any race were 1.77% of the population.

There were 1,545 households, out of which 34.1% had children under the age of 18 living with them, 44.7% were married couples living together, 14.8% had a female householder with no husband present, and 35.3% were non-families. 28.9% of all households were made up of individuals, and 12.6% had someone living alone who was 65 years of age or older. The average household size was 2.54 and the average family size was 3.11.

In the CDP, the population was spread out, with 28.7% under the age of 18, 7.9% from 18 to 24, 28.8% from 25 to 44, 21.0% from 45 to 64, and 13.6% who were 65 years of age or older. The median age was 36 years. For every 100 females, there were 97.1 males. For every 100 females age 18 and over, there were 90.0 males.

The median income for a household in the CDP was $35,826, and the median income for a family was $43,704. Males had a median income of $33,769 versus $22,279 for females. The per capita income for the CDP was $15,550. About 5.3% of families and 9.1% of the population were below the poverty line, including 7.9% of those under age 18 and 15.9% of those age 65 or over.
