= Barre (CDP), Massachusetts =

Barre, Massachusetts
- CDP
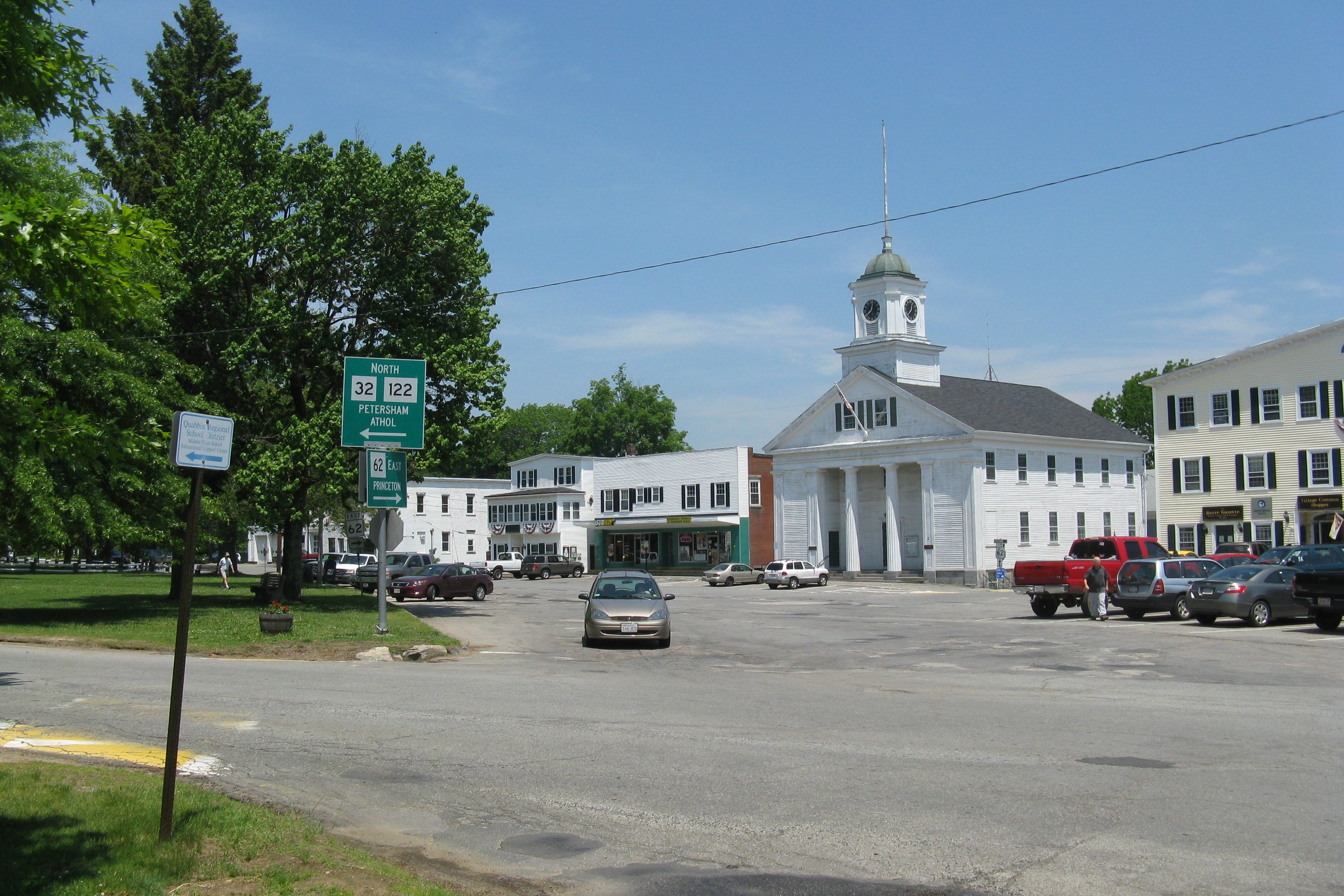
- Barre Center

- Location in Worcester County and the state of Massachusetts.
- Coordinates: 42°25′21″N 72°6′18″W
- Country: United States
- State: Massachusetts
- County: Worcester

Area
  - Total: 1.58 sq mi (4.10 km^{2})
  - Land: 1.58 sq mi (4.10 km^{2})
  - Water: 0 sq mi (0.00 km^{2})
- Elevation: 912 ft (278 m)

Population (2020)
  - Total: 1,029
  - Density: 650.4/sq mi (251.12/km^{2})
- Time zone: UTC-5 (Eastern (EST))
  - Summer (DST): UTC-4 (EDT)
- ZIP code: 01005
- Area code: 978
- FIPS code: 25-03705
- GNIS feature ID: 0609878

Barre is a census-designated place (CDP) in the town of Barre in Worcester County, Massachusetts, United States. The population was 1,009 at the 2010 census.

== Geography ==
Barre /ˈbæri/ is located at 42°25′20″N 72°6′18″W (42.422456, -72.105011).

According to the United States Census Bureau, the CDP has a total area of 4.2 km^{2} (1.6 mi^{2}), all land.

== Demographics ==
Historical population
Census	Pop.	Note	%±
2020	1,029		—
U.S. Decennial Census

At the 2000 census there were 1,150 people, 463 households, and 285 families in the CDP. The population density was 274.1/km^{2} (710.7/mi^{2}). There were 487 housing units at an average density of 116.1/km^{2} (301.0/mi^{2}). The racial makeup of the CDP was 96.78% White, 0.52% Black or African American, 0.35% Native American, 0.43% Asian, 0.70% from other races, and 1.22% from two or more races. Hispanic or Latino of any race were 0.96%.

Of the 463 households 31.5% had children under the age of 18 living with them, 48.2% were married couples living together, 10.4% had a female householder with no husband present, and 38.4% were non-families. 31.7% of households were one person and 15.8% were one person aged 65 or older. The average household size was 2.48 and the average family size was 3.18.

The age distribution was 27.3% under the age of 18, 4.7% from 18 to 24, 31.9% from 25 to 44, 19.9% from 45 to 64, and 16.2% 65 or older. The median age was 38 years. For every 100 females, there were 92.3 males. For every 100 females age 18 and over, there were 90.0 males.

The median household income was $49,028 and the median family income was $65,192. Males had a median income of $42,098 versus $28,375 for females. The per capita income for the CDP was $25,972. None of the families and 1.9% of the population were living below the poverty line, including no under eighteens and none of those over 64.
