= Woodford Street Historic District =

Historic district in Massachusetts, United States

- U.S. National Register of Historic Places
- U.S. Historic district
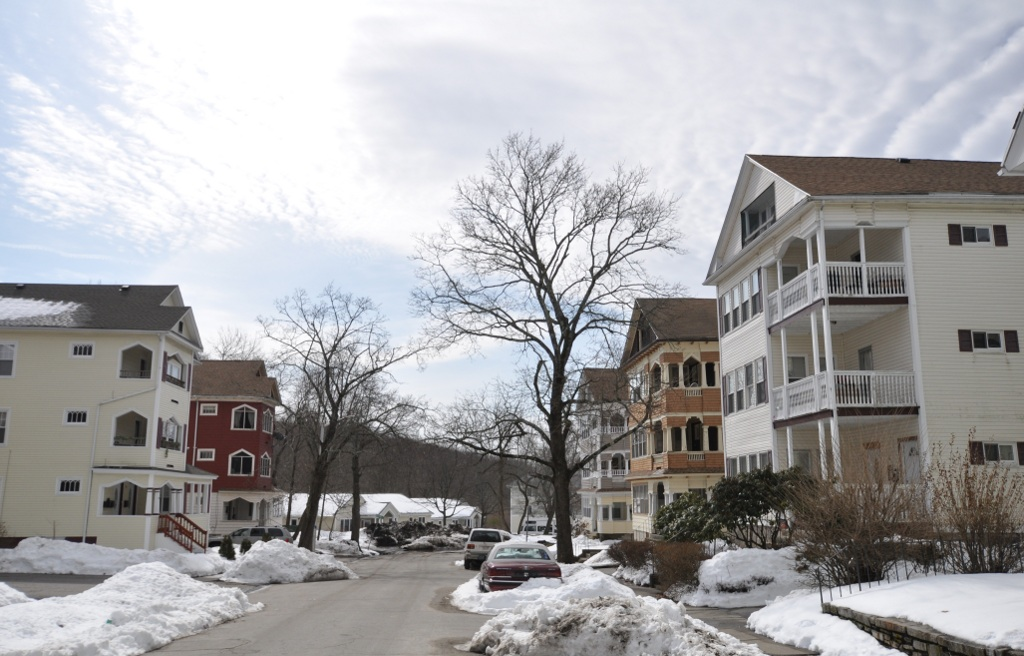
- The five houses of the district

- Location within Massachusetts Location within the United States
- Location: 35–39 and 38–40 Woodford St., Worcester, Massachusetts
- Coordinates: 42°14′36″N 71°47′26″W
- Area: less than one acre
- Built: 1926
- Architectural style: Colonial Revival, Bungalow/Craftsman
- MPS: Worcester MRA; Worcester Three-Deckers TR
- NRHP reference No.: 89002365
- Added to NRHP: February 9, 1990

The Woodford Street Historic District includes a cohesive collection of five triple decker houses at 35–39 and 38–40 Woodford Street in Worcester, Massachusetts. Built about 1926, they are a well-preserved group of Colonial Revival houses built in the last phase of the city's triple decker development. The district was listed on the National Register of Historic Places in 1990.

== Description and history ==
Woodford Street is a residential street located on the eastern edge of Worcester's southeastern Vernon Hill neighborhood, running north-south between Koping and Holcombe Streets, parallel to Massachusetts Route 122A. The five houses of this district are located near the southern end of the street. All five were built c. 1926, and are predominantly Colonial Revival in style, although with some Craftsman features. Instead of having a more typical polygonal bay on one side of an asymmetrical facade, these houses have panels of four windows that do not project. They all have clapboard siding on the first level, shingle siding on the upper level and a fully pedimented gable end, with a wide cornice that has regularly spaced brackets. Porches are three-level, although each level generally has different styling.

These houses were built during the last decade of Worcester's triple decker development phase. The neighborhood attracted a number of middle-class and predominantly Jewish families, many of whom moved from the Grafton Hill area further north. Early owners and residents included a number of merchants or merchant employees; Max Katz, who owned the two houses at 38 and 40 Woodford was the president of a local brickmaking firm, and also owned a number of other residential properties.

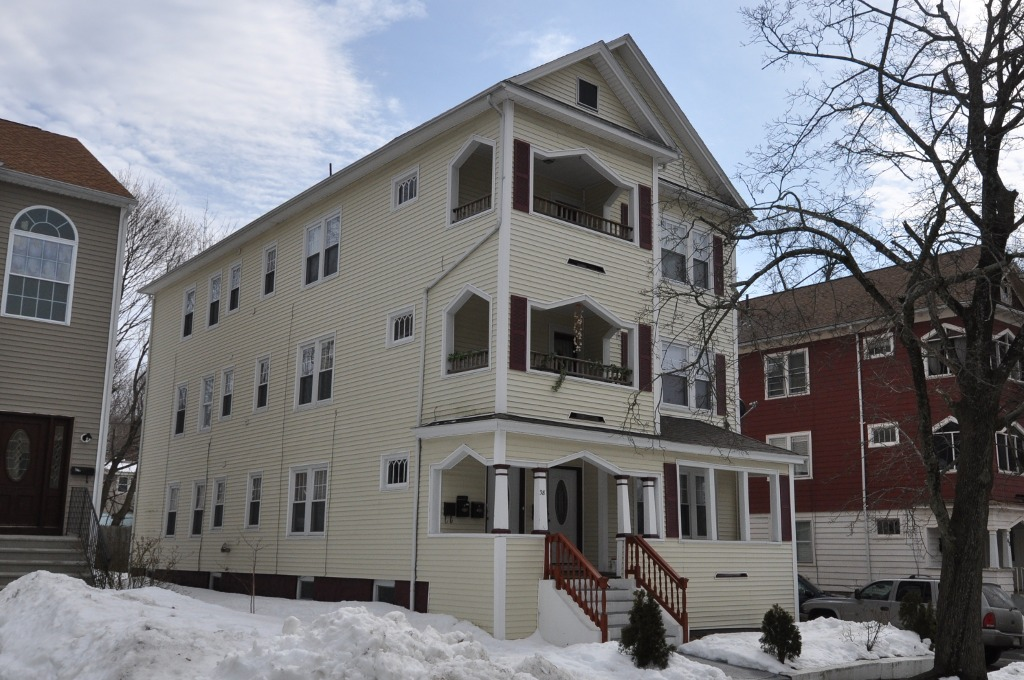
38 Woodford Road

== See also ==
- National Register of Historic Places listings in eastern Worcester, Massachusetts
