= Providence Street Historic District =

Historic district in Massachusetts, United States

- U.S. National Register of Historic Places
- U.S. Historic district
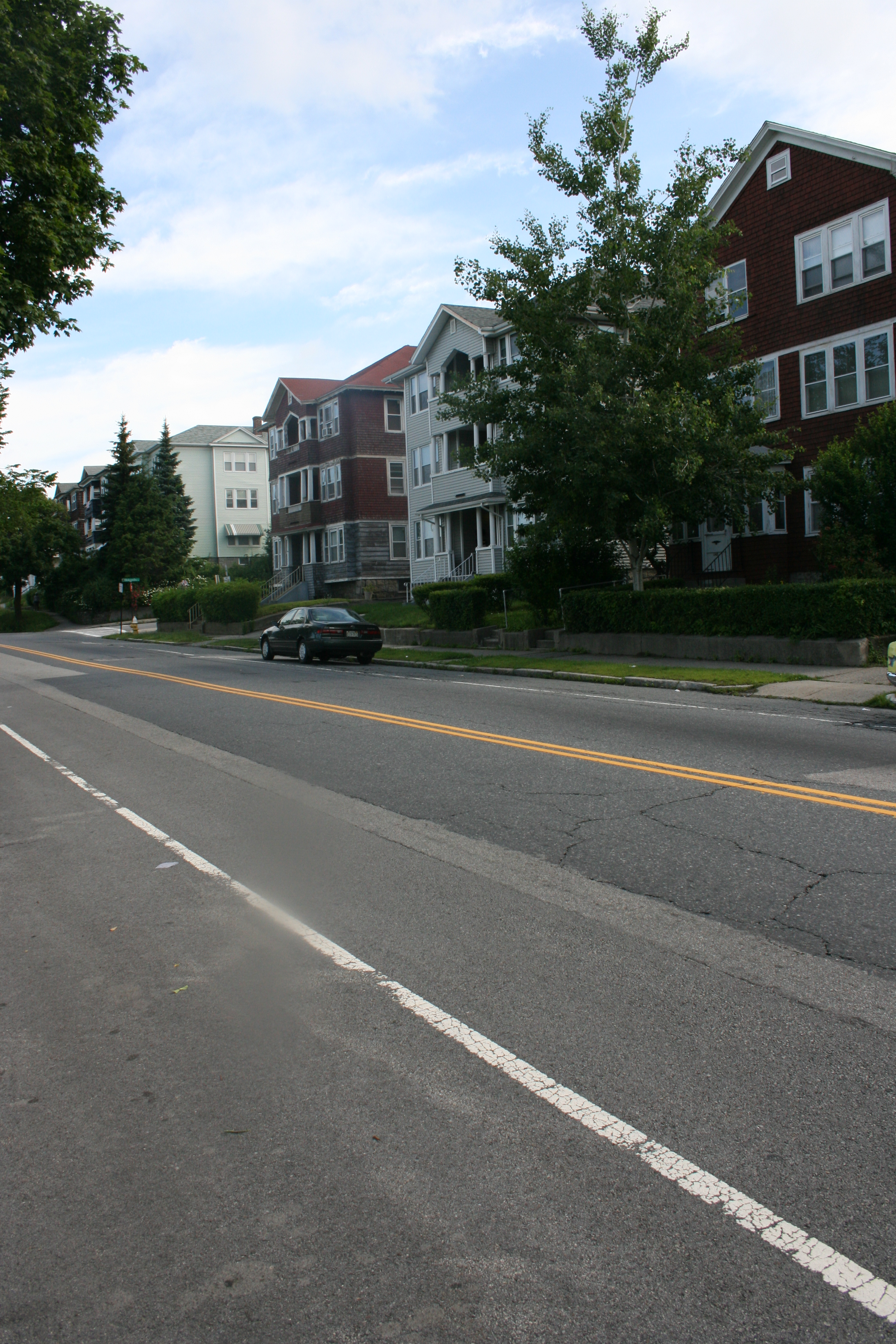

- Location within Massachusetts Location within the United States
- Location: 127–145 Providence St., Worcester, Massachusetts
- Coordinates: 42°14′47″N 71°47′32″W
- Built: 1926
- Architectural style: Colonial Revival, Bungalow/Craftsman
- MPS: Worcester Three-Deckers TR
- NRHP reference No.: 89002381
- Added to NRHP: February 9, 1990

The Providence Street Historic District is a historic district in Worcester, Massachusetts. It includes a cohesive collection of triple decker houses built in the late 1920s in the Vernon Hill section of the city. The ten primary buildings in the 1.39-acre (0.56 ha) district are fine examples of Colonial Revival and Craftsman styling; there are also seven period garages. The district was listed on the National Register of Historic Places in 1990.

The development of triple deckers on Worcester's south side had reached the vicinity of the Worcester Academy grounds by the mid-1920s. A series of them were laid on along Providence Street (Massachusetts Route 122A), and built between 1926 and 1930 during the last phase of triple decker development. They were probably built by the Dworman Building Company, and many of them were first occupied by predominantly Jewish families moving to the area from homes closer to the city center. In 1930, four of the ten buildings were owned by Hyman Zive, a realtor with other property holdings in the city, and only two were occupied by their owners.

The seven buildings at 127-139 Providence Street are nearly identical in their construction. These Colonial Revival structures have hipped roofs and full three-level porches topped by a gable with a diamond light window. The porches have square columns, and each level has a slightly different styling: the first level has an arched opening, the second a peaked one, and the third a bracketed square opening. Railings on the upper levels have narrow spindled balusters. Most of these seven buildings have wood clapboard siding on the first level and wood shingles on the upper levels; those at 131 and 133 Providence have clapboards on all levels, with bands of shingles between the floors. The three buildings at 141-145 Providence are all Craftsman in their styling.

== See also ==
- National Register of Historic Places listings in eastern Worcester, Massachusetts
