= Grafton Street School =

- U.S. National Register of Historic Places
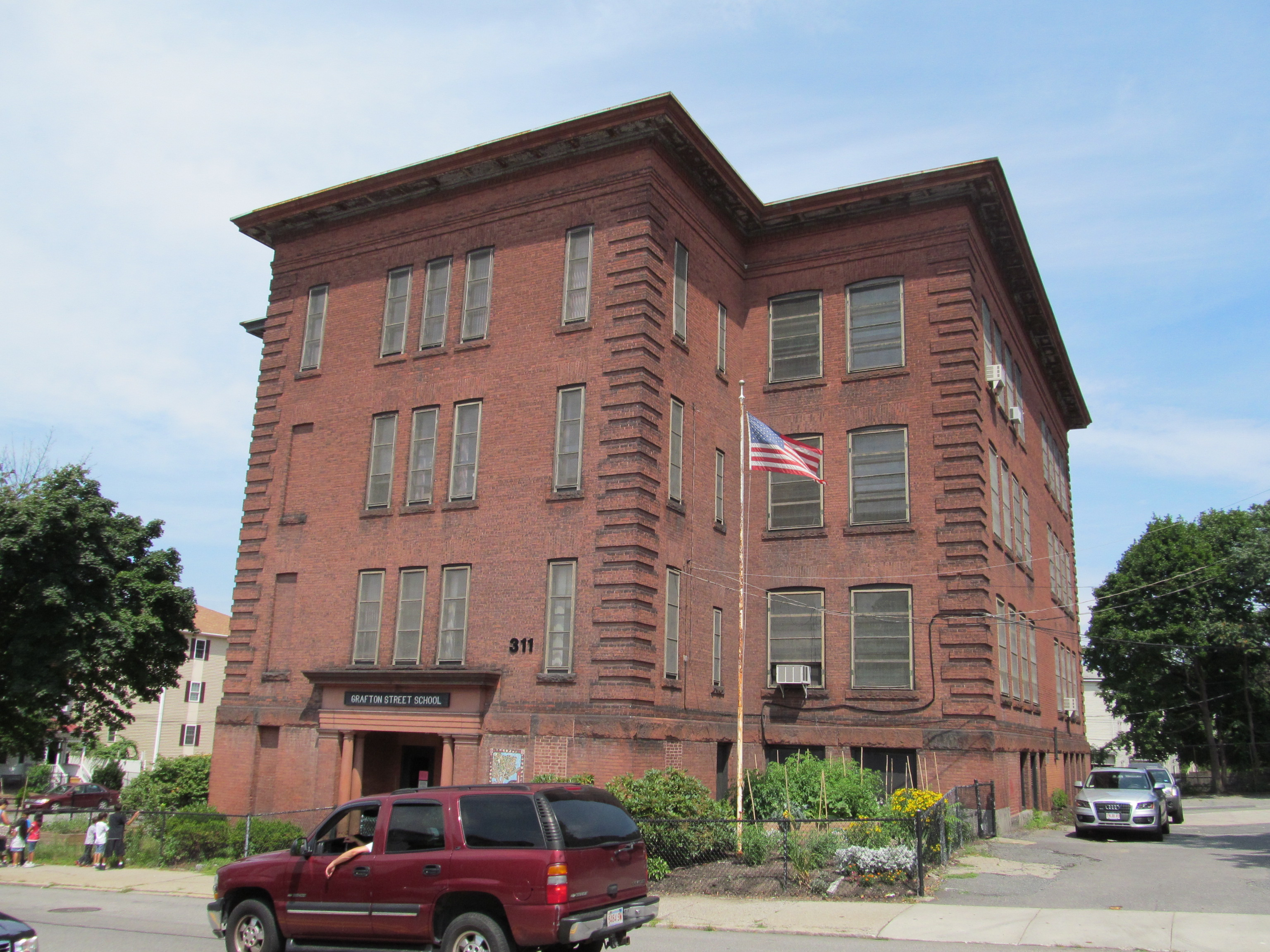
- Grafton Street School

- Location within Massachusetts Location within the United States
- Location: 311 Grafton St., Worcester, Massachusetts
- Coordinates: 42°15′23″N 71°47′15″W
- Built: 1879
- Architect: E. Boyden & Son; J. William Patston
- MPS: Worcester MRA
- NRHP reference No.: 80000545
- Added to NRHP: March 05, 1980

The Grafton Street School is a historic school at 311 Grafton Street in Worcester, Massachusetts. The school consists of two buildings, built in 1879 and 1899, that feature high-quality Late Victorian architecture. The buildings were listed on the National Register of Historic Places in 1980.

== Description and history ==
The Grafton Street School is located in central eastern Worcester, on the north side of Grafton Street (Massachusetts Route 122). The property is bounded on the west by Fay Street and on the east by Wall Street, and includes two buildings. The first, a 2 1/2-story brick building with a hip roof, was constructed in two phases, and replaced an earlier wood-frame structure. The southern half of the building was built first, to a design by local architects E. Boyden & Son, and was enlarged to the north in 1897 to designs by the same firm. This building has sandstone trim, and banding in blackened bricks. A separate, three story building was added to the site in 1899, to plans by J. William Patston. It also has sandstone trim, and features brick quoining at its corners. The older building has Queen Anne styling, a relative rarity in the city for a school building, and the later building has more Colonial Revival features.

The need for the school's repeated expansions was caused by a shift in the neighborhood's character from one that was originally suburban, to one of more densely-built triple decker housing.

== See also ==
- National Register of Historic Places listings in eastern Worcester, Massachusetts
