= Ingleside Avenue Historic District =

Historic district in Massachusetts, United States

- U.S. National Register of Historic Places
- U.S. Historic district
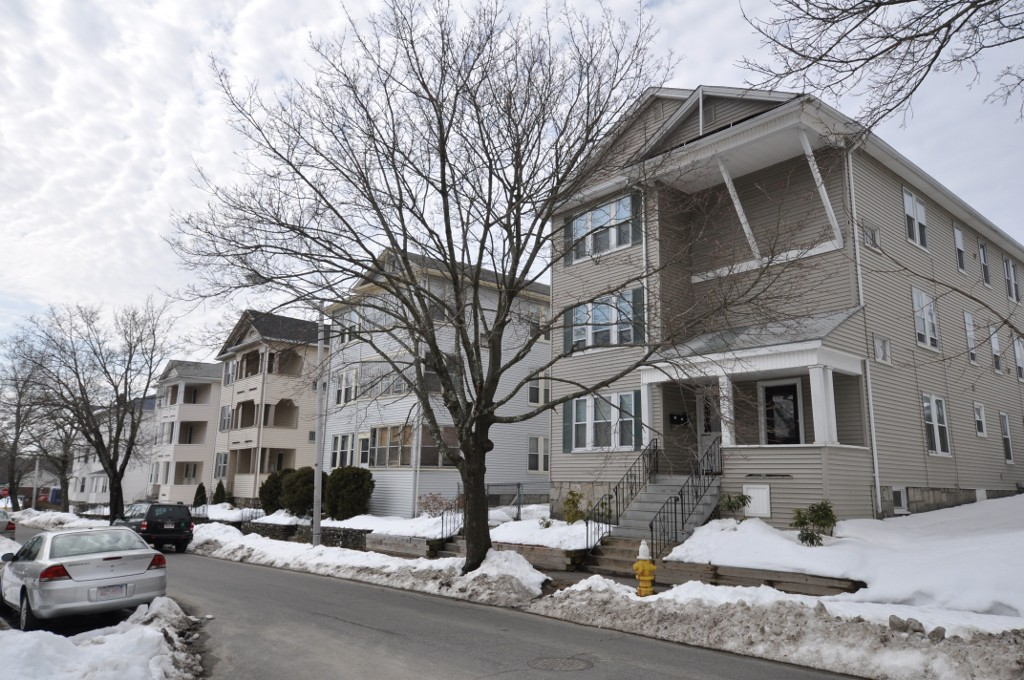
- 218 is on the right, 228 on the left

- Location within Massachusetts Location within the United States
- Location: 218–220 and 226–228 Ingleside Ave., Worcester, Massachusetts
- Coordinates: 42°15′5″N 71°46′50″W
- Area: less than one acre
- Built: 1928
- Architectural style: Colonial Revival
- MPS: Worcester Three-Deckers TR
- NRHP reference No.: 89002369
- Added to NRHP: February 9, 1990

The Ingleside Avenue Historic District is a residential historic district in Worcester, Massachusetts. It consists of a cluster of four triple decker residences and three period garages, all built c. 1928, during the last phase of triple decker construction in the city. All have retained some of their Colonial Revival styling. The district was listed on the National Register of Historic Places in 1990.

== Description and history ==
Ingleside Avenue is located on Worcester southeast side, north of Grafton Street (Massachusetts Route 122), one the major arteries through the area. Ingleside runs north from Grafton Street to Plantation Street, with the historic district located on the west side of the southernmost block. Located on this block are four similar triple deckers, all built about 1928. They are roughly matched pairs of buildings, each pair having one building with a hip roof, and the other with a gabled roof, that are otherwise virtually identical in their construction and Colonial Revival styling.

The buildings of the district have undergone a number of changes since the district was listed on the National Register in 1990. The buildings then had clapboard siding, with cut shingles on the skirts between the levels, but all have since had their exteriors reclad in modern siding. 218 Ingleside has had its upper two porches removed; these were previously similar to those of the other buildings, supported by groups of square columns. The district originally included three period garages, of which only one is still standing.

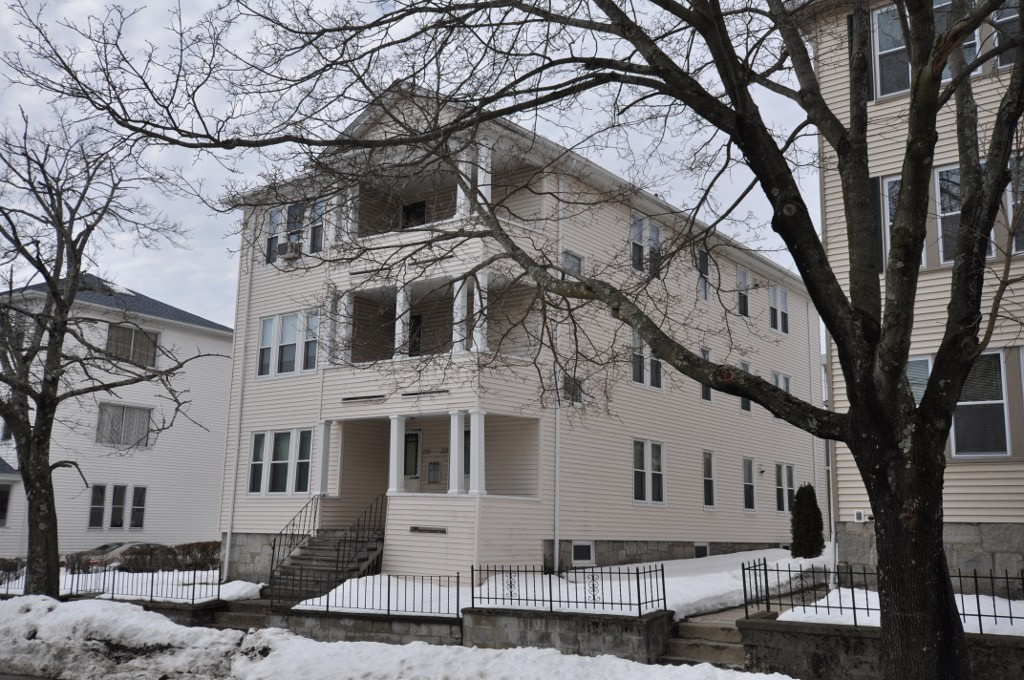
228 Ingleside Ave.

== See also ==
- National Register of Historic Places listings in eastern Worcester, Massachusetts
