= David Dworman Three-Decker =

- U.S. National Register of Historic Places
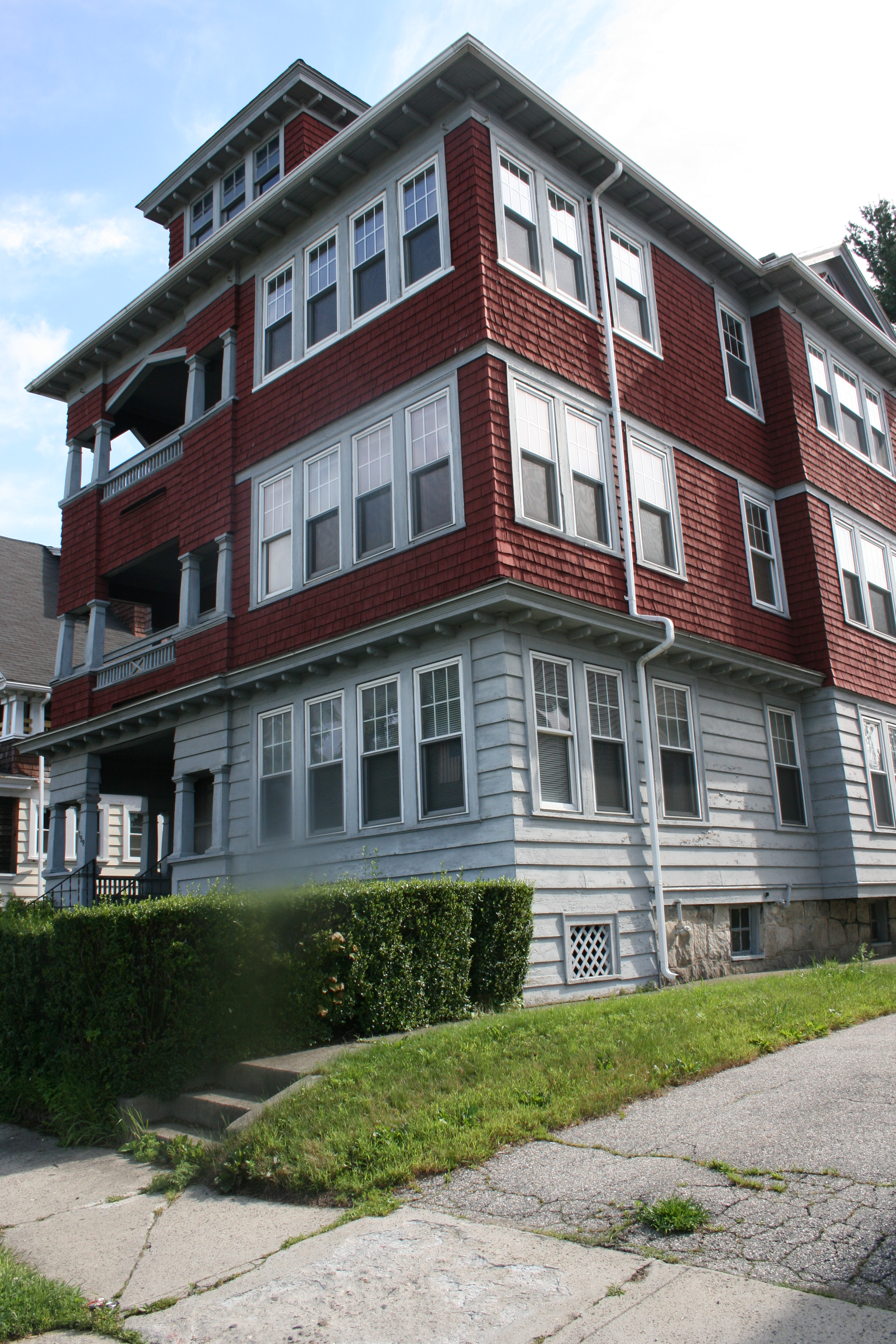

- Location within Massachusetts Location within the United States
- Location: 159 Providence St., Worcester, Massachusetts
- Coordinates: 42°14′41″N 71°47′30″W
- Area: less than one acre
- Built: 1926
- Architect: Dworman Building Co.
- Architectural style: Bungalow/Craftsman
- MPS: Worcester Three-Deckers TR
- NRHP reference No.: 89002430
- Added to NRHP: February 9, 1990

The David Dworman Three-Decker is a historic triple decker in Worcester, Massachusetts. Built in 1926 for the builder's family, it is a remarkably well-built and preserved example of a Craftsman style triple decker. The building was listed on the National Register of Historic Places in 1990.

== Description and history ==
The David Dworman Three-Decker is located in Worcester's southern Vernon Hill neighborhood, on the east side of Providence Street (Massachusetts Route 122A) opposite Vernon Hill Park. It is a three-story wood frame structure, with a hip roof, from which a three-window shed-roof dormer projects. The ground floor is finished in wide wooden clapboards, while the upper floors are finished in wooden shingles. The main facade is asymmetrical, with a recessed porch stack on the left and bands of four sash windows on the right. The porches feature square columns set above the enclosed balustrades. There is a projecting rectangular bay on the side, with bands of three sash windows at each level, and a pedimented gable above that has a diamond-light window at the center.

The triple decker was built c. 1926 by David Dworman, a major developer of the Vernon Hill area, for the family's use. The Dwormans were responsible for building a number of triple deckers in the Woodford Street area just to the east. In addition to the Dwormans, early residents included merchants and salesmen.

== See also ==
- National Register of Historic Places listings in eastern Worcester, Massachusetts
