= Massachusetts Route 31 =

North-south state highway in Massachusetts, US

Route 31

Route information
- Maintained by MassDOT
- Length: 58.80 mi (94.63 km)

Major junctions
- South end: Route 197 at the Connecticut state line in Quinebaug, CT
- US 20 in Charlton; Route 9 in Spencer; Route 2 in Fitchburg
- North end: NH 31 at the New Hampshire state line near Ashby

Location
- Country: United States
- State: Massachusetts
- Counties: Worcester, Middlesex

Highway system
- Massachusetts State Highway System; Interstate; US; State
← Route 30	→ Route 32

Route 31 is a 58.80-mile-long (94.63 km) north–south state highway in the U.S. state of Massachusetts. It runs from Dudley on the Connecticut border to Ashby on the New Hampshire border.

== Route description ==
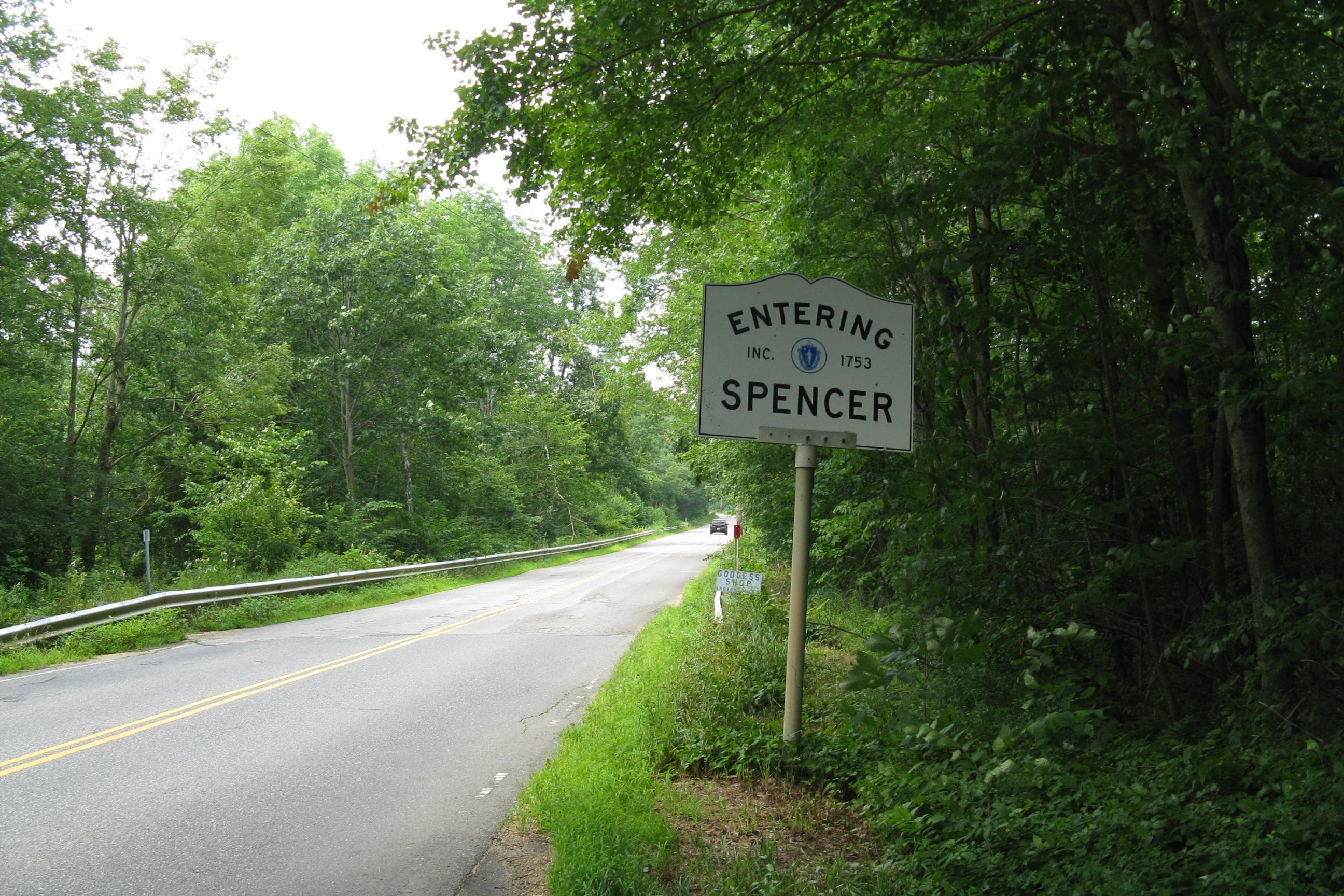
Route 31 entering Spencer from Charlton.

Route 31 begins in Dudley at the Connecticut border, where it is known as Dresser Hill Road. Dresser Hill Road begins in Quinebaug, Connecticut, at Route 197 where it is a short (approximately 220-foot-long (67 m)) local road erroneously signed as Connecticut Route 31 changing to Route 31 at the Massachusetts state line, then proceeding through Dudley and into Charlton, winding over Dresser Hill with several moderately steep grades and some tight corners.

In Charlton, it intersects U.S. Route 20 a few miles east of the I-90 and I-84 interchange. This provides its only connection with an interstate highway. In Charlton, it is known as Dresser Hill Road, Main Street, Masonic Home Road, Brookfield Road, City Depot Road and New Spencer Road. Other junctions include Mugget Hill Road, Old Worcester Road, Central Depot Road and Little Mugget Road.

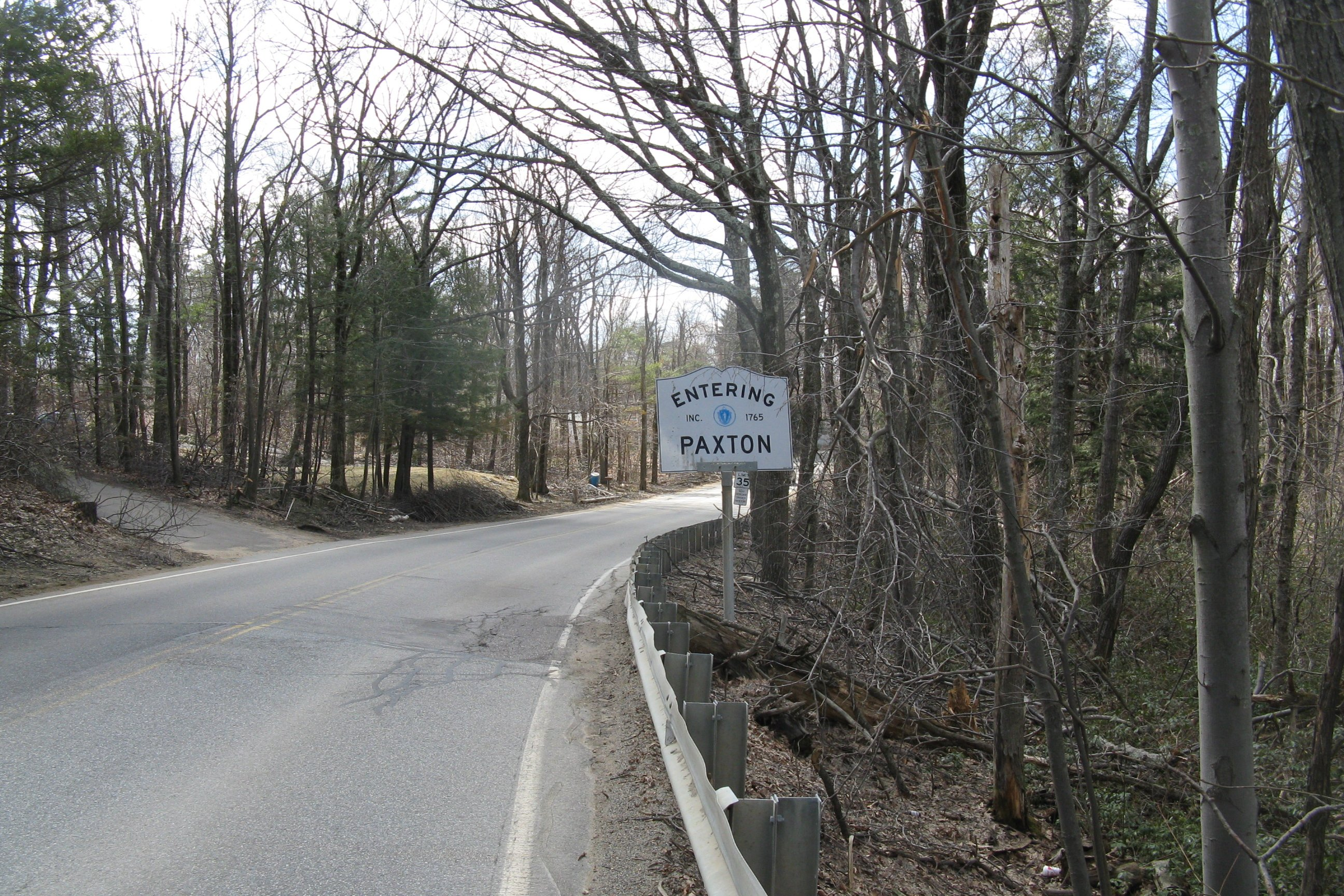
Route 31 entering Paxton from Holden.

Route 31 then enters Spencer, where it parallels the Podunk Pike (Route 49) for several miles. As Charlton Road, it passes the Spencer State Forest. In the center of Spencer , it crosses Route 9. It then turns north towards Paxton; this stretch is scenic and hilly. Several warning signs are seen here for sharp corners, warning of a maximum safe speed of 30 miles per hour (48 km/h). Most of Route 31 in Spencer was re-paved recently.

After a couple long, sweeping corners through a forest of pine trees, Route 31 enters Paxton. Paxton Center School comes after a treed-in section. The intersections of Route 31, Route 122, and Route 56 comprise Paxton Center. Route 31 is variously known as West Street and Holden Street in Paxton; it runs east–west in this section. It passes over a hill past Richards Memorial Library, then uses Grove Street for approximately 1/4 mile (0.40 km).

In Holden, Route 31 passes Asnebumskit Pond and is bridged over Kendall Reservoir. After the intersection with Route 122A it passes Gale Free Public Library and heads north once again. The road heads into an increasingly rural area as the hills get steeper and longer.

Route 31 then enters Princeton and begins climbing very steeply; it gains about 300 feet (91 m) in approximately 1/2 mile (0.80 km). Entering the center of Princeton, it joins Route 62 and turns east to avoid going over Mount Wachusett. The mountain is instead connected by Mountain Road. After separating from Route 62, Route 31 joins Route 140 and becomes Fitchburg Road near Paradise Pond.

It passes through a portion of Leominster State Forest in Westminster before an interchange with a freeway segment of Route 2. After this interchange, Route 31 becomes a city street, having shared roadway with Route 2A and a wrong-way concurrency with Route 12. It then passes through downtown Fitchburg. As it leaves Fitchburg it is called Ashby State Road. In Ashby, it connects with Route 119 before reaching the New Hampshire state border, where it becomes New Hampshire Route 31.

The stretch of Route 31 from Paxton Center to Holden Center is named the Chief Robert J. Mortell Memorial Highway, after Paxton chief of police Robert Mortell, who was killed in the line of duty on February 1, 1994, in the deeply wooded area bordering Route 31.

== Major intersections ==
County	Location	mi	km	Destinations	Notes
Worcester	Dudley	0.0	0.0	Route 197	Southern terminus; Connecticut state line; access via Dresser Hill Road
Worcester	Charlton	9.3	15.0	US 20 – Sturbridge, Springfield, Worcester, Marlboro	
Worcester	Spencer	16.8	27.0	Route 9 east – Worcester	Southern end of Route 9 concurrency
Worcester	Spencer	16.9	27.2	Route 9 west – Brookfield	Northern end of Route 9 concurrency
Worcester	Paxton	25.3	40.7	Route 56 south / Route 122 – Barre, Athol, Worcester, Leicester	Southern end of Route 56 concurrency
Worcester	Paxton	25.4	40.9	Route 56 north – Rutland	Northern end of Route 56 concurrency
Worcester	Holden	30.1	48.4	Route 122A – Rutland, Barre, Worcester, Milbury	
Worcester	Princeton	37.7	60.7	Route 62 west – Hubbardston, Barre	Southern end of Route 62 concurrency
Worcester	Princeton	38.0	61.2	Route 62 east – Sterling, Clinton	Northern end of Route 62 concurrency
Worcester	Princeton	40.5	65.2	Route 140 south to I-190 – Sterling, Shrewsbury	Southern end of Route 140 concurrency
Worcester	Princeton	42.1	67.8	Route 140 north – Westminster, Winchendon	Northern end of Route 140 concurrency
Worcester	Fitchburg	45.8	73.7	Route 2 – Concord, Boston, Athol, Greenfield	Exit 95 on Route 2
Worcester	Fitchburg	47.0	75.6	Route 2A west – Westminster, Gardner	Southern end of Route 2A concurrency
Worcester	Fitchburg	48.1	77.4	Route 12 north – Ashburnham, Winchendon	Southern end of Route 12 concurrency
Worcester	Fitchburg	48.9	78.7	Route 12 south – Leominster, Worcester	Northern end of Route 12 concurrency
Worcester	Fitchburg	47.0	75.6	Route 2A east – Lunenburg, Ayer	Northern end of Route 2A concurrency
Middlesex	Ashby	55.4	89.2	Route 119 west – Ashby, Rindge, NH	Southern end of Route 119 concurrency
Middlesex	Ashby	55.5	89.3	Route 119 east – Townsend, Groton	Northern end of Route 119 concurrency
Middlesex	Ashby	58.8	94.6	NH 31 north – Greenville	Continuation into New Hampshire
1.000 mi = 1.609 km; 1.000 km = 0.621 mi: Concurrency terminus
