= Kelley Square =

Intersection in Worcester, Massachusetts

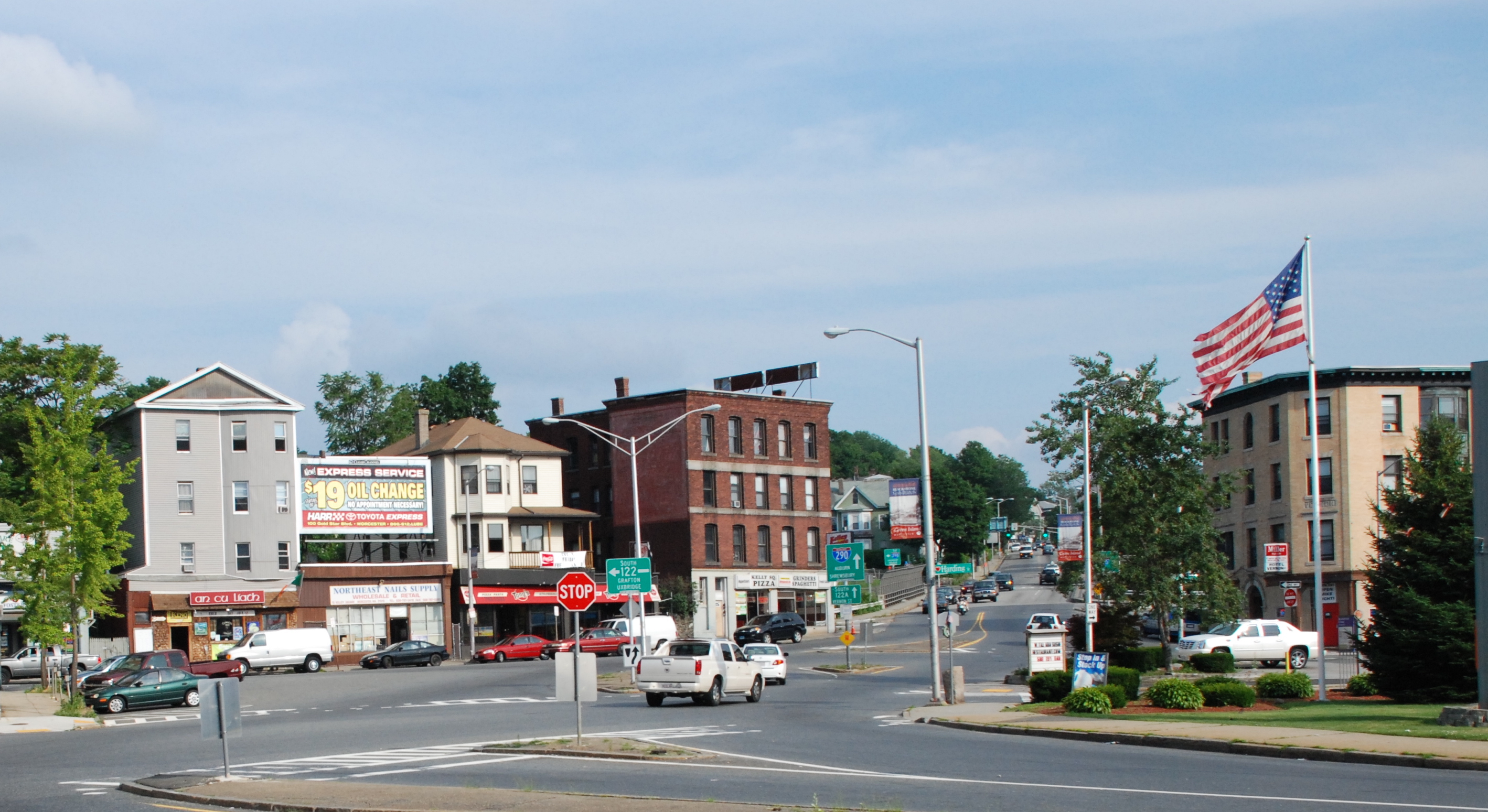
- View of the square in 2008 from Madison Street

Location
- Worcester, Massachusetts
- Coordinates: 42°15′18.25″N 71°47′52.22″W
- Roads at junction: Route 122 (Madison Street (two-way), Harding Street (inbound-only), Water Street (outbound-only)); Route 122A (Vernon Street & Madison Street); I-290 (ramps at Vernon Street)

Construction
- Type: Intersection, hybrid roundabout

Kelley Square is a square located in Worcester, Massachusetts, at the intersection of Massachusetts Route 122 and 122A, with ramp access to and from Interstate 290. It is named for Sgt. Cornelius F. Kelley, who died of wounds received in battle in Verdun, France, on October 13, 1918. With a complex convergence of multiple roads, the square has previously been ranked as the state's most dangerous intersection, and as of 2019 was ranked as the eighth-most dangerous intersection in Massachusetts.

== Roads ==
The seven roads that intersect Kelley Square are listed below, starting with Madison Street on the west side of the square and proceeding around the square in a clockwise manner.

Local road	Route no.	Description
Madison Street	122 / 122A†	Two-way traffic, entering and exiting the square at west
Green Street	—	Two-way traffic, entering and exiting the square at north
Harding Street (from Winter Street)	122	One-way traffic, entering the square from the northeast
Water Street	122	One-way traffic, exiting the square to the northeast
Vernon Street	122A	Two-way traffic, entering and exiting the square at southeast; ramps to/from I-290 are located here
Millbury Street	—	One-way traffic, exiting the square to the southwest‡
Harding Street (from Arwick Avenue)	—	One-way traffic, entering the square from the southwest‡

† Route confluence
‡ Per traffic flow changes implemented in May 2020

== Redevelopment ==
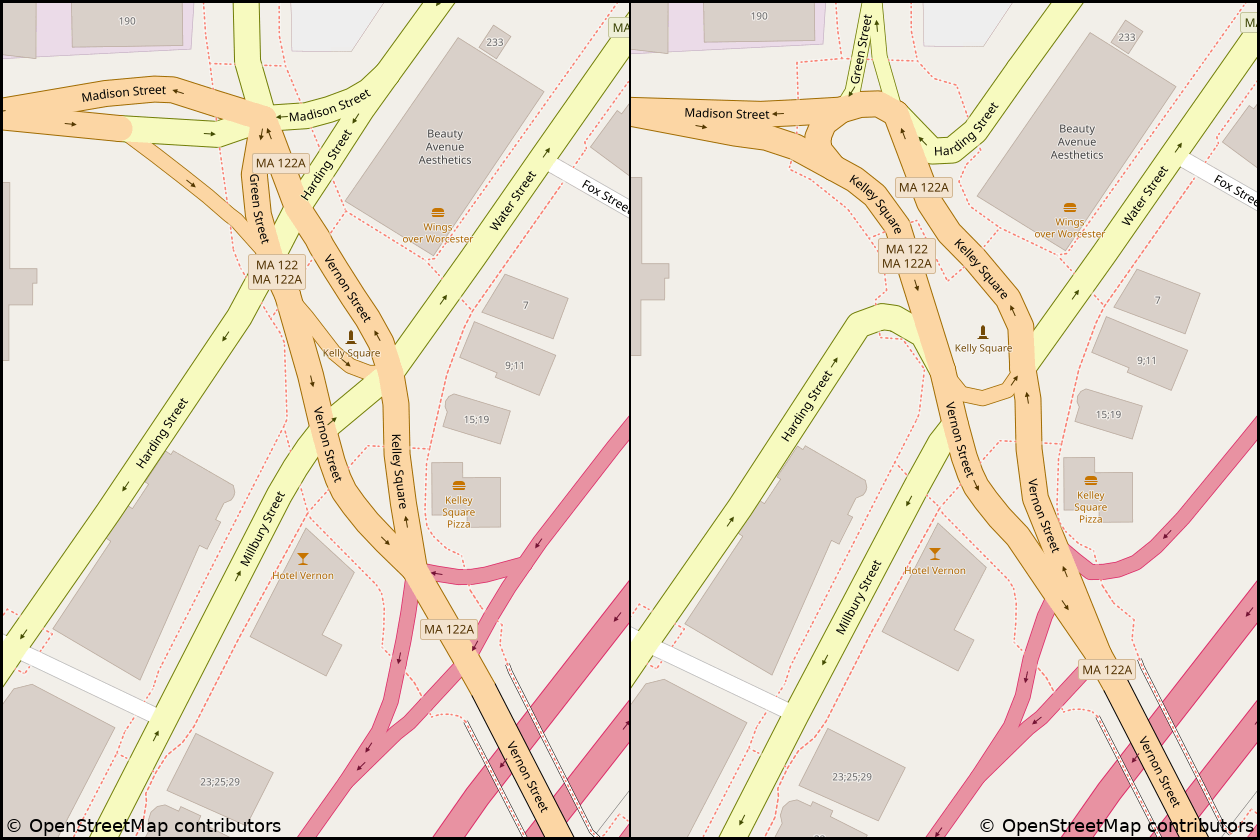
Before and after the 2020 reconfiguration

In October 2019, officials held a groundbreaking for the Kelley Square Improvement Project, a $240 million redevelopment project that includes construction of Polar Park, a new minor league baseball stadium, along with hotels and apartments, as well as reconstructing the square as a modified roundabout.

As part of the project, the Massachusetts Department of Transportation (MassDOT) permanently reversed the direction of traffic flow on Millbury Street, and Harding Street south of the square, effective May 6, 2020.
