= Massachusetts Route 56 =

State highway in Worcester County, Massachusetts, US

Route 56
- Route 56 highlighted in red

Route information
- Maintained by MassDOT
- Length: 20.1 mi (32.3 km)
- Existed: 1939–present

Major junctions
- South end: Route 12 in Oxford
- US 20 in Oxford; Route 9 in Leicester; Route 31 / Route 122 in Paxton; Route 122A in Rutland
- North end: Route 68 in Rutland

Location
- Country: United States
- State: Massachusetts
- Counties: Worcester

Highway system
- Massachusetts State Highway System; Interstate; US; State
← Route 53	→ Route 57

Route 56 is a north–south state highway running 20.1 miles (32.3 km) through central Worcester County, Massachusetts, United States. Its southern terminus is at Route 12 in Oxford and its northern terminus is at Route 68 in Rutland. Along the way it intersects major east–west highways including U.S. Route 20 (US 20) in Oxford and Route 9 in Leicester.

== Route description ==
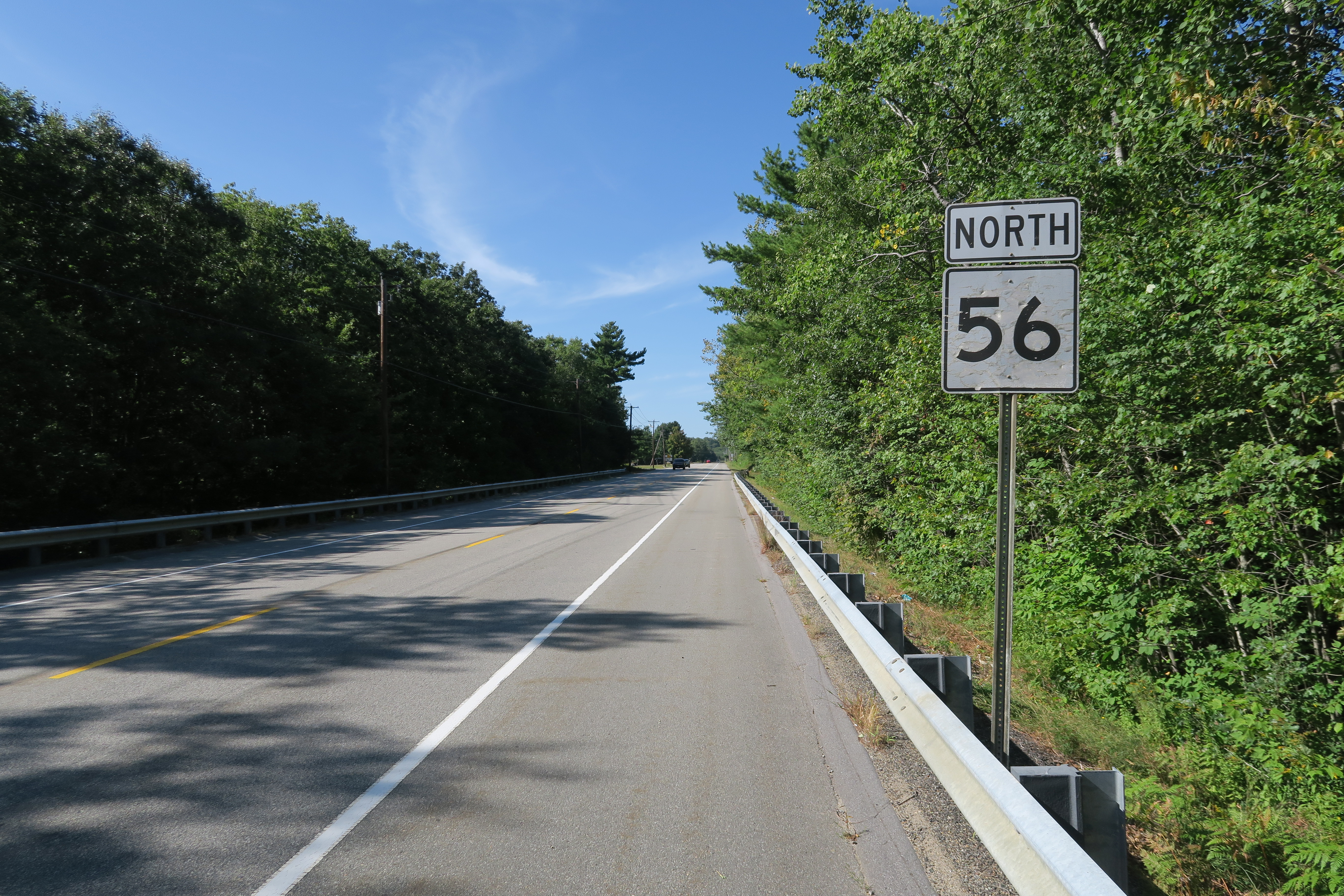
Northbound in Leicester

Route 56 begins at Route 12 in North Oxford. It crosses the French River before meeting U.S. Route 20. It continues north, passing under Interstate 90 (the Mass Pike) without access between the two. (The nearest access to the Pike is in Auburn.) Route 56 then crosses the French River again at the intersection of Mills Street and Commons Road before entering the town of Leicester. It follows the Huntoon Memorial Highway until turning right onto Pleasant Street, following that street into the center of town, intersecting Route 9 and turns east onto Main Street and then north on Paxton Street, passing Becker College in the process.

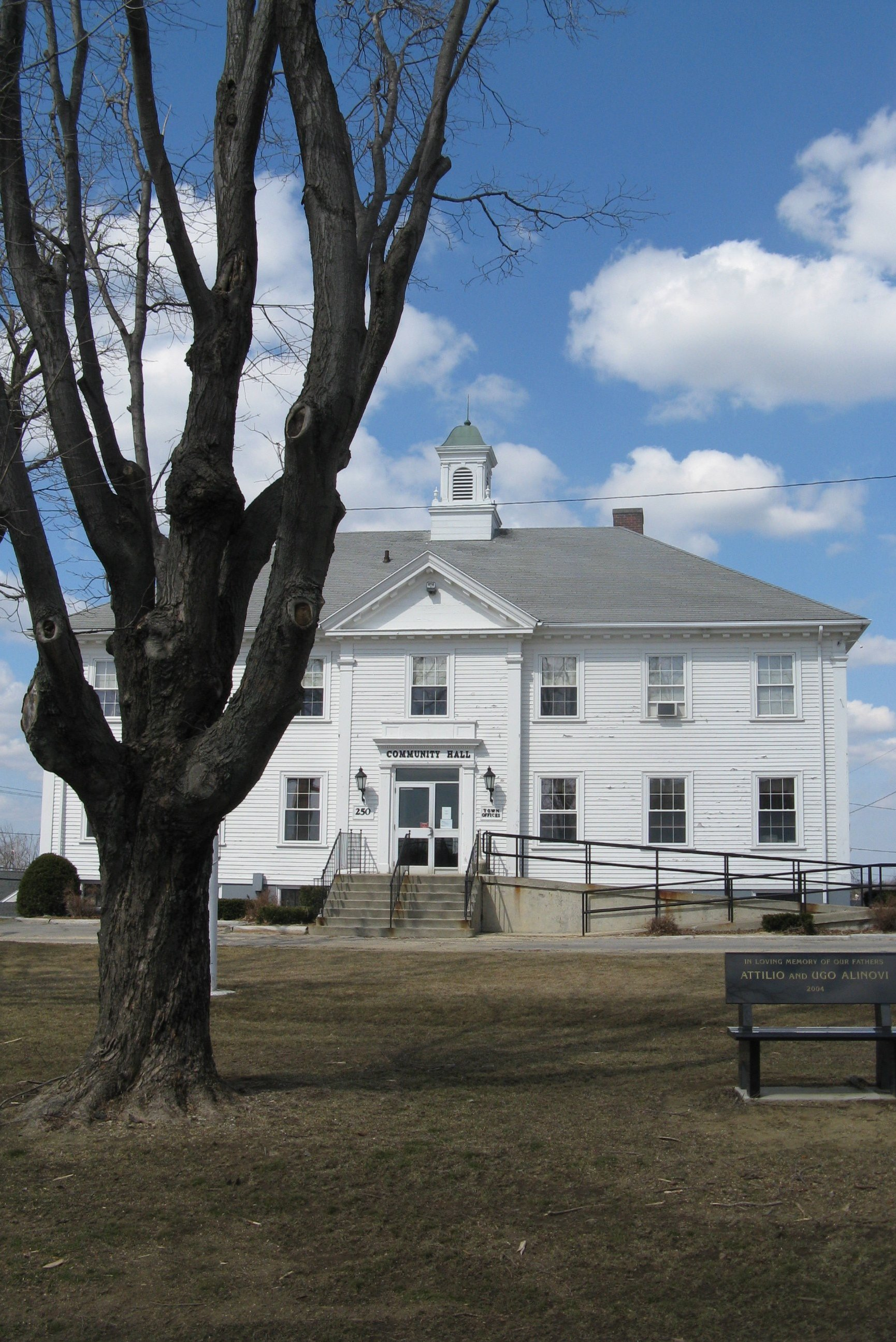
Rutland Community Hall, located along Route 56

Route 56 continues northward, passing several of the Kettle Brook Reservoirs as it enters Paxton. Paxton Street turns into Reservoir Road as route 56 enters Paxton. In Paxton, Route 56 begins a 1.3 miles (2.1 km) concurrency with Route 122 which takes it into the center of Paxton. At the intersection of Route 122 and Route 31, Route 56 joins Route 31 northbound for less than a tenth of a mile before the two split, with Route 56 heading northward. The route then enters the town of Rutland, passing northward towards that town's center. The route has a 0.1 miles (0.16 km) concurrency with Route 122A through the town center before turning northward again, ending at Route 68 near the Hubbardston town line.

== Major intersections ==
The entire route is in Worcester County.

Location	mi	km	Destinations	Notes
Oxford	0.0	0.0	Route 12 – Oxford, Webster, Auburn, Worcester	Southern terminus
Oxford	0.5	0.80	US 20 – Auburn, Worcester, Charlton, Springfield	
Leicester	6.3	10.1	Route 9 – Worcester, Shrewsbury, Amherst	To Worcester Airport
Paxton	10.2	16.4	Route 122 south – Worcester	Southern terminus of Route 122 concurrency
Paxton	11.5	18.5	Route 122 north / Route 31 south – Barre, Spencer, Charlton	Northern terminus of Route 122 concurrency; southern terminus of Route 31 concurrency
Paxton	11.6	18.7	Route 31 north – Holden, Princeton	Northern terminus of Route 31 concurrency
Rutland	16.4	26.4	Route 122A south – Holden, Worcester	Southern terminus of Route 122A concurrency
Rutland	16.5	26.6	Route 122A north – Barre	Northern terminus of Route 122A concurrency
Rutland	20.1	32.3	Route 68 to Route 62 – Hubbardston, Gardner, Holden, Worcester	Northern terminus
1.000 mi = 1.609 km; 1.000 km = 0.621 mi: Concurrency terminus
