= Massachusetts Route 12 =

State highway in Worcester County, Massachusetts, US

Route 12
- Route 12 highlighted in red

Route information
- Maintained by MassDOT
- Length: 64.41 mi (103.66 km)
- Existed: 1922–present

Major junctions
- South end: Route 12 at the Connecticut state line in Dudley
- Route 16 / Route 193 in Webster; US 20 from Oxford to Auburn; I-90 / Mass Pike / I-290 / I-395 / US 20 in Auburn; I-290 / Route 9 in Worcester; I-190 in Worcester, West Boylston, and Sterling; Route 2 in Leominster; US 202 in Winchendon
- North end: NH 12 at the New Hampshire state line near Winchendon

Location
- Country: United States
- State: Massachusetts
- Counties: Worcester

Highway system
- Massachusetts State Highway System; Interstate; US; State
← Route 11	→ Route 13
← Route 11	N.E.	→ Route 12A

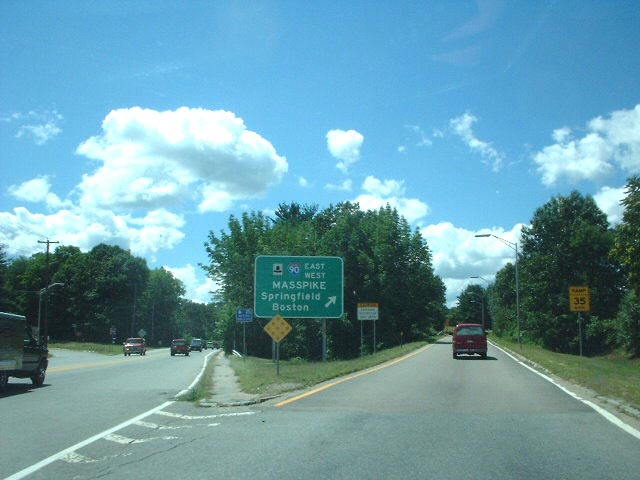
Massachusetts State Route 12

Massachusetts Route 12 is a 64.41-mile-long (103.66 km) north-south state highway that runs through central Massachusetts from the Connecticut state line in Dudley north to the New Hampshire state line in Winchendon, where it continues as New Hampshire Route 12.

== Route description ==
Route 12 begins at the Connecticut border, from which it continues south as Connecticut Route 12, in Dudley. The route initially proceeds northward along the western side of the French River. After 1.7 miles (2.7 km), it intersects Route 197 and turns northeast, crossing the river into Webster. The route passes through the town center, before intersecting Route 16 immediately west of its junction with Interstate 395, as well as Route 193. From the intersection, the route runs northward, closely parallel to the Interstate Highway. It continues into Oxford and through the town center, 2 miles (3.2 km) north of which it turns northeast towards North Oxford, where it intersects Route 56. Route 12 then proceeds northeast for 0.8 miles (1.3 km) and joins U.S. Route 20. The two routes concurrently enter Auburn and continue northeast for 0.7 miles (1.1 km). After branching off, Route 12 remains parallel to US 20 until it meets an interchange connecting the Massachusetts Turnpike (Interstate 90) with Interstates 290 and 395. After indirectly encountering a single southbound exit ramp from I-290, Route 12 crosses the Interstate and turns in a more northerly direction, then receives a ramp that allows northbound traffic from I-395 to access the Turnpike via Route 12. The route then crosses the Turnpike and passes the Auburn Mall, continuing alongside I-290 into Worcester.

Through Worcester, Route 12 follows a series of turns that take it west of the city center. Shortly after entering Worcester, Route 12 turns west as Hope Avenue, crossing I-290 at an incomplete interchange. From the interchange it forms the southern and western boundaries of Hope Cemetery, as it turns north on Webster Street. The route crosses through Webster Square as Mill Street, then joins Route 9 as Park Avenue. The two routes head northeast, crossing Route 122 and beginning an additional concurrency with Route 122A. Route 9 later diverges eastward onto Highland Street, while Routes 12 and 122A continue northeast on Park Avenue. After passing the Worcester Polytechnic Institute and the American Antiquarian Society, the routes turn northward and intersect Grove Street. Route 122A departs westward on Grove Street, while Route 12 continues north as a pair of wide one-way roads: Gold Star Boulevard northbound and West Boylston Street southbound. The pair encounter an interchange with Interstate 190 next to the Greendale Mall, after which West Boylston Street carries both directions of Route 12, continuing north past Quinsigamond Community College. Just before leaving the city, Route 12 meets a set of ramps connecting to I-190 once again.

Route 12 proceeds north into West Boylston, meeting Route 140 near the town center. The two routes cross the western arm of the Wachusett Reservoir and pass the Old Stone Church, after which Route 140 departs to the northwest, while Route 12 soon after reaches the western terminus of Route 110. Heading north from the reservoir, Route 12 enters Sterling and meets Route 62, sharing a brief concurrency in the town center. Towards the north, Route 12 crosses I-190 at an interchange and continues into Leominster, where it intersects Route 117 just before reaching the city center. North of downtown, Route 12 intersects Route 13 and later meets Route 2 at an interchange, after which passes Fitchburg Municipal Airport and heads northwest into Fitchburg. Route 12 joins Route 2A just south of downtown Fitchburg, and the two routes pass the city center on the opposite side of the North Nashua River. Following the river, Routes 12 and 2A head west and join Route 31 in a triple concurrency. The three routes continue southwest along the river into West Fitchburg, where Route 12 separates from Routes 2A and 31 and turns northwest, passing through the northeast corner of Westminster and into Ashburnham. After crossing Route 101 in the town center, Route 12 continues northwest into Winchendon, encountering the northern terminus of Route 140 before intersecting U.S. Route 202 in the town center. The route ends in Winchendon at the New Hampshire border, beyond which it continues as New Hampshire Route 12 into Fitzwilliam.

== History ==
Route 12 has a junction with Interstate 90 (the Massachusetts Turnpike) at an interchange in Auburn that also includes Interstates 290 and 395 and U.S. 20. Route 12 has an interchange with I-290 in Worcester, and three interchanges with I-190, in Worcester, West Boylston, and Sterling. Route 12 is a minor road in Massachusetts, having been replaced by I-395 from the Connecticut state line to Auburn, I-290 from Auburn to Worcester, and I-190 from Worcester to Leominster.

== Major intersections ==
The entire route is in Worcester County.

Location	mi	km	Destinations	Notes
Dudley	0.0	0.0	Route 12 south – Thompson	Continuation into Connecticut
Dudley	1.7	2.7	Route 197 west – Quinebaug	Eastern terminus of Route 197
Webster	3.4	5.5	Route 16 east / Route 193 south to I-395 – East Douglas, Milford, Thompson, CT	Western terminus of Route 16; northern terminus of Route 193
Oxford	11.2	18.0	Route 56 north – Leicester, Rutland	Southern terminus of Route 56
Oxford	12.0	19.3	US 20 west – Sturbridge, Springfield	Southern end of US 20 concurrency
Auburn	12.6	20.3	US 20 east to I-290 east – Worcester	Northern end of US 20 concurrency
Auburn	13.6	21.9	I-90 / Mass Pike / I-290 east / I-395 south / US 20 east – Worcester, New London, CT, Boston, Springfield	Exit 90 on I-90 / Mass Pike; exit 12 on I-290; US 20 not signed
Worcester	17.6	28.3	I-290 east to Route 9 / I-190 north – Worcester, Marlboro	Exit 14 on I-290
Worcester	19.1	30.7	Route 9 west – Leicester	Southern end of Route 9 concurrency
Worcester	20.5	33.0	Route 122 / Route 122A south – Paxton, Millbury, Grafton	Southern end of Route 122A concurrency
Worcester	21.2	34.1	Route 9 east – Shrewsbury, Westboro	Northern end of Route 9 concurrency
Worcester	22.5	36.2	Route 122A north to Grove Street – Holden, Rutland	Northern end of Route 122A concurrency
Worcester	23.1	37.2	I-190 to I-290 / I-395 south – Leominster, Fitchburg, Shrewsbury, Marlboro, Auburn, Norwich, CT	Exit 1 on I-190
West Boylston	26.1	42.0	I-190 – Fitchburg, Worcester	Exit 4 on I-190
West Boylston	27.9	44.9	Route 140 south to I-290 – Shrewsbury Route 110 begins	Southern end of Route 140 concurrency; western terminus of Route 110
West Boylston	28.8	46.3	Route 140 north – Westminster, Gardner	Northern end of Route 140 concurrency
West Boylston	29.0	46.7	Route 110 east – Clinton, Lowell	Northern end of Route 110 concurrency
Sterling	33.4	53.8	Route 62 west – Princeton, Mount Wachusett	Southern end of Route 62 concurrency
Sterling	33.7	54.2	Route 62 east – Clinton	Northern end of Route 62 concurrency
Sterling	35.2	56.6	I-190 – Fitchburg, Worcester	Exit 14 on I-190
Leominster	40.1	64.5	Route 117 east – Lancaster, Waltham	Western terminus of Route 117
Leominster	40.7	65.5	Route 13 north – Lunenburg	Southern terminus of Route 13; access to Fitchburg Airport
Leominster	41.6	66.9	Route 2 – Concord, Boston, Athol, Greenfield	Exit 99 on Route 2
Fitchburg	46.1	74.2	Route 2A east / Route 31 north – Ashby, Lunenburg	Southern end of Route 2A/Route 31 concurrency
Fitchburg	47.0	75.6	Route 2A west / Route 31 south – Westminster, Princeton	Northern end of Route 2A/Route 31 concurrency
Ashburnham	53.1	85.5	Route 101 to Route 119 – Ashby, New Ipswich, NH, Gardner, Templeton	
Winchendon	59.0	95.0	Route 140 south – Gardner, Princeton, Worcester	Northern terminus of Route 140
Winchendon	61.4	98.8	US 202 – Athol, Holyoke, Rindge, NH, Peterborough, NH	
Winchendon	64.41	103.66	NH 12 north – Fitzwilliam	Continuation into New Hampshire
1.000 mi = 1.609 km; 1.000 km = 0.621 mi: Concurrency terminus; Incomplete access

== See also ==
- New England Interstate Route 12
