= Polar Park (baseball park) =

Ballpark for the Worcester Red Sox

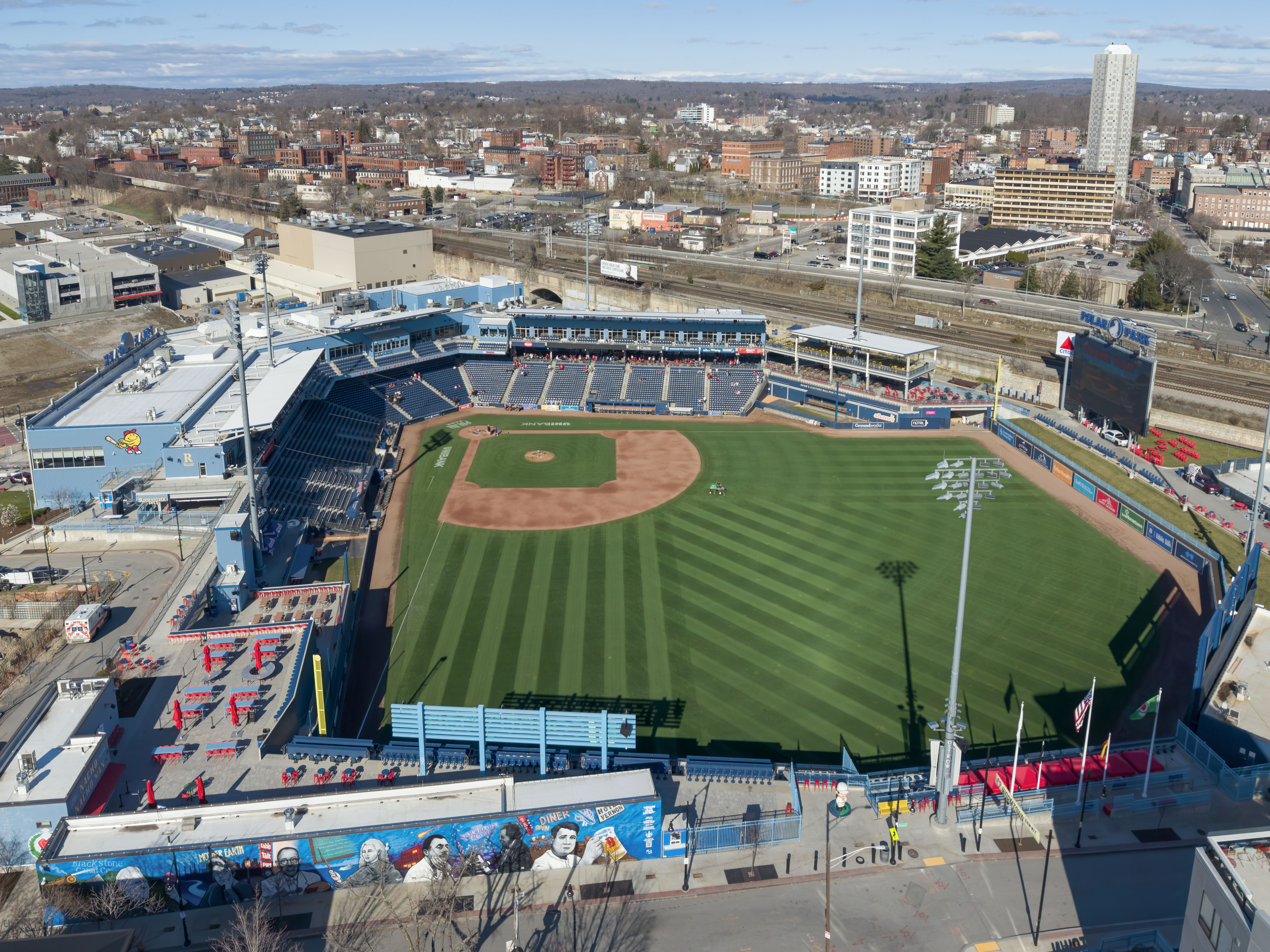
- The ballpark in 2026

- Location within Massachusetts Location within the United States
- Interactive map of Polar Park
- Address: 100 Madison St, Worcester, Massachusetts 01608
- Location: Worcester, Massachusetts
- Coordinates: 42°15′25″N 71°48′0″W
- Owner: City of Worcester
- Capacity: 9,508 (2021)
- Executive suites: 22
- Surface: Kentucky Blue Grass
- Field size: Left field: 329 feet (100 m); Left-center: 391 feet (119 m); Center field: 402 feet (123 m); Right-center: 370 feet (110 m); Right field: 320 feet (98 m)

Construction
- Groundbreaking: July 11, 2019
- Opened: May 11, 2021
- Cost: land: $ 41 million; park: $118 million; total: $159 million
- Architect: D'Agostino Izzo Quirk Architects (DAIQ)
- Project manager: Skanska USA

Tenant
- Worcester Red Sox (IL) 2021–present

Website
- polarpark.com

Polar Park is a baseball park in Worcester, Massachusetts, serving as the home of the Worcester Red Sox, a Minor League Baseball team competing at the Triple-A level and an affiliate of the Boston Red Sox. Opened for the 2021 Triple-A season, it has a seating capacity of 9,508 people. Polar Beverages, a local beverage company based in Worcester, has retained the naming rights to the ballpark.

== Development ==
The stadium was constructed to be the home ballpark of the Worcester Red Sox, following the 2018 announcement by team owner Larry Lucchino and partners to relocate the Triple-A affiliate of the Boston Red Sox to Worcester, Massachusetts. From 1973 through 2020, the Pawtucket Red Sox were Boston's Triple-A affiliate (the team was a Double-A affiliate during 1970–1972), and played their home games at McCoy Stadium in Pawtucket, Rhode Island.

The ballpark architect was Worcester native Tommy Quirk of D'Agostino Izzo Quirk Architects (DAIQ), with assistance from consultant Janet Marie Smith, Executive Vice President of Planning and Development for the LA Dodgers, and who designed Oriole Park at Camden Yards. On September 13, 2018, the Worcester City Council voted 9–1 to move forward with the new ballpark, initiating the bonding process and tax increment financing (TIFs) for the surrounding area.

Development was expected to cost $101 million, with approximately $65 million to be paid by the city of Worcester. The $101 million figure would make the park the fourth most expensive minor league park ever built, adjusting for inflation. In September 2018, Deadspin reported that, according to College of the Holy Cross sports economist Victor Matheson, Polar Park would be "in nominal terms the most expensive minor league ballpark ever built." In April 2021, a month before opening, the total actual cost was reported as $159 million, including $41 million for land, making the ballpark design and construction cost $118 million. The City of Worcester paid 55 percent, the team paid 38 percent, and government paid the remaining amount.

The stadium is part of a $240 million redevelopment of Worcester's Kelley Square and Canal District. Development of the ballpark area was to include 250 apartments, two hotels with a total of 250 rooms, a 96,000-square-foot (8,900 m^{2}) office building overlooking left field playing area, and 65,000 square feet (6,000 m^{2}) of shops and restaurants.

Ceremonial groundbreaking of the ballpark took place on July 11, 2019, with local, state, and federal officials attending. On April 1, 2020, amid the COVID-19 pandemic, construction work on the ballpark was suspended; it resumed after a seven-week pause. The final beam was placed on August 13, 2020. As of mid-August 2020, officials were still optimistic that the park would be ready for the start of the 2021 minor league baseball season. In late October 2020, the infield was sodded with Kentucky Blue Grass.

== Operation ==
With the release of the 2021 minor league schedule, the first home game at Polar Park was initially scheduled for April 13. However, with the start of the Triple-A season delayed into May, the home opener was rescheduled for May 11.

On April 1, 2021, with construction of parts of the facility still continuing, Worcester Red Sox players took the field for their first workout there. Due to the COVID-19 pandemic in Massachusetts, attendance at Polar Park was limited during 2021, to 25% of capacity at the start of the season. On May 11, the first Triple-A game was played at the ballpark, with Worcester hosting the Syracuse Mets. All seating limits were lifted and the park was allowed to seat at full capacity as of May 29, 2021.

On October 23, 2021, Polar Park hosted its first football game as nearby Holy Cross played Colgate University in a Patriot League rivalry game. Holy Cross also played Bucknell and Harvard at Polar Park in 2022 and 2023, respectively.

In January 2022, ownership announced several upgrades to the park, including a new video board in right field and additional seating in right-center field to be called "Papi's Power Alley".

== Gallery ==
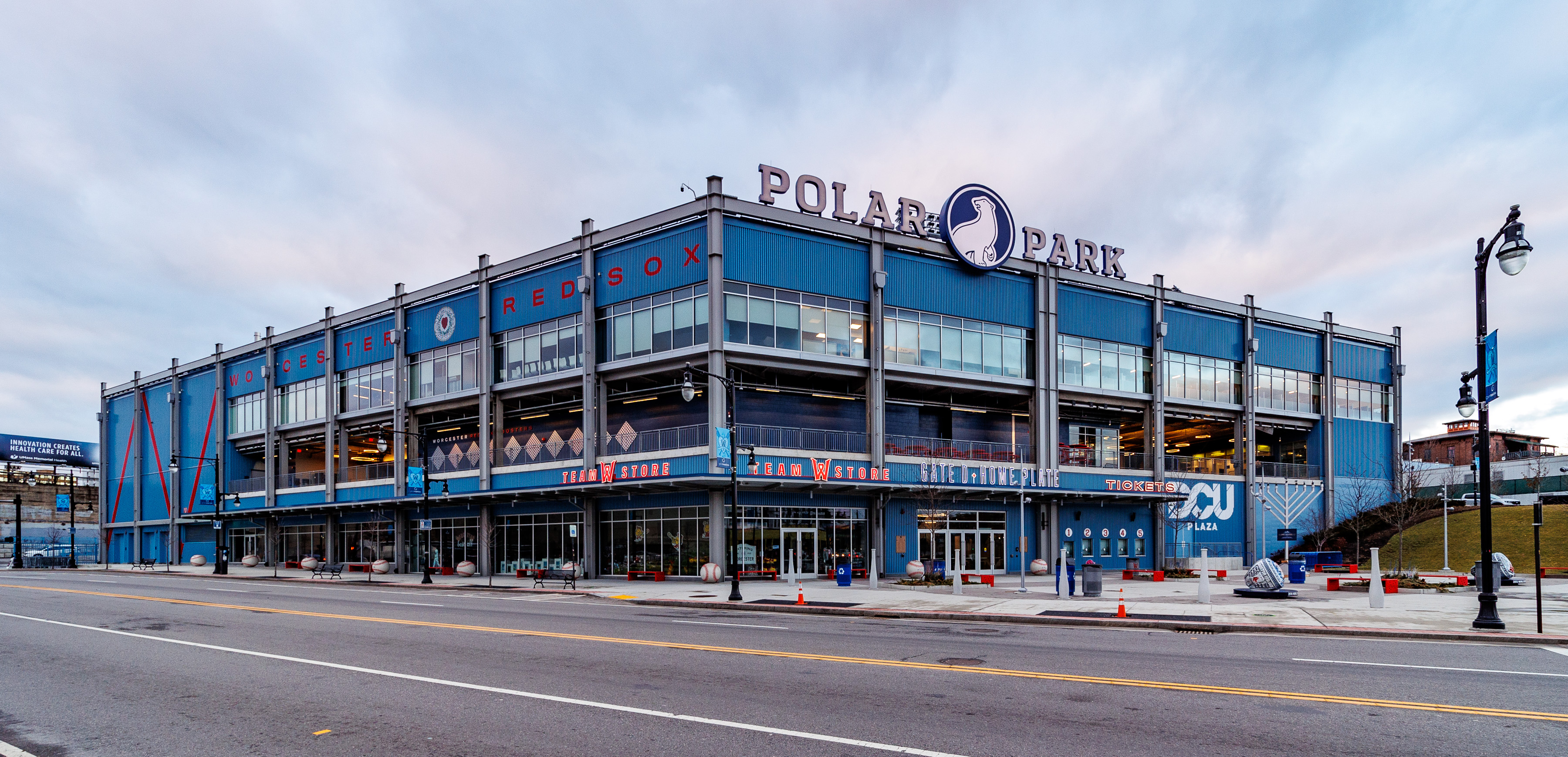

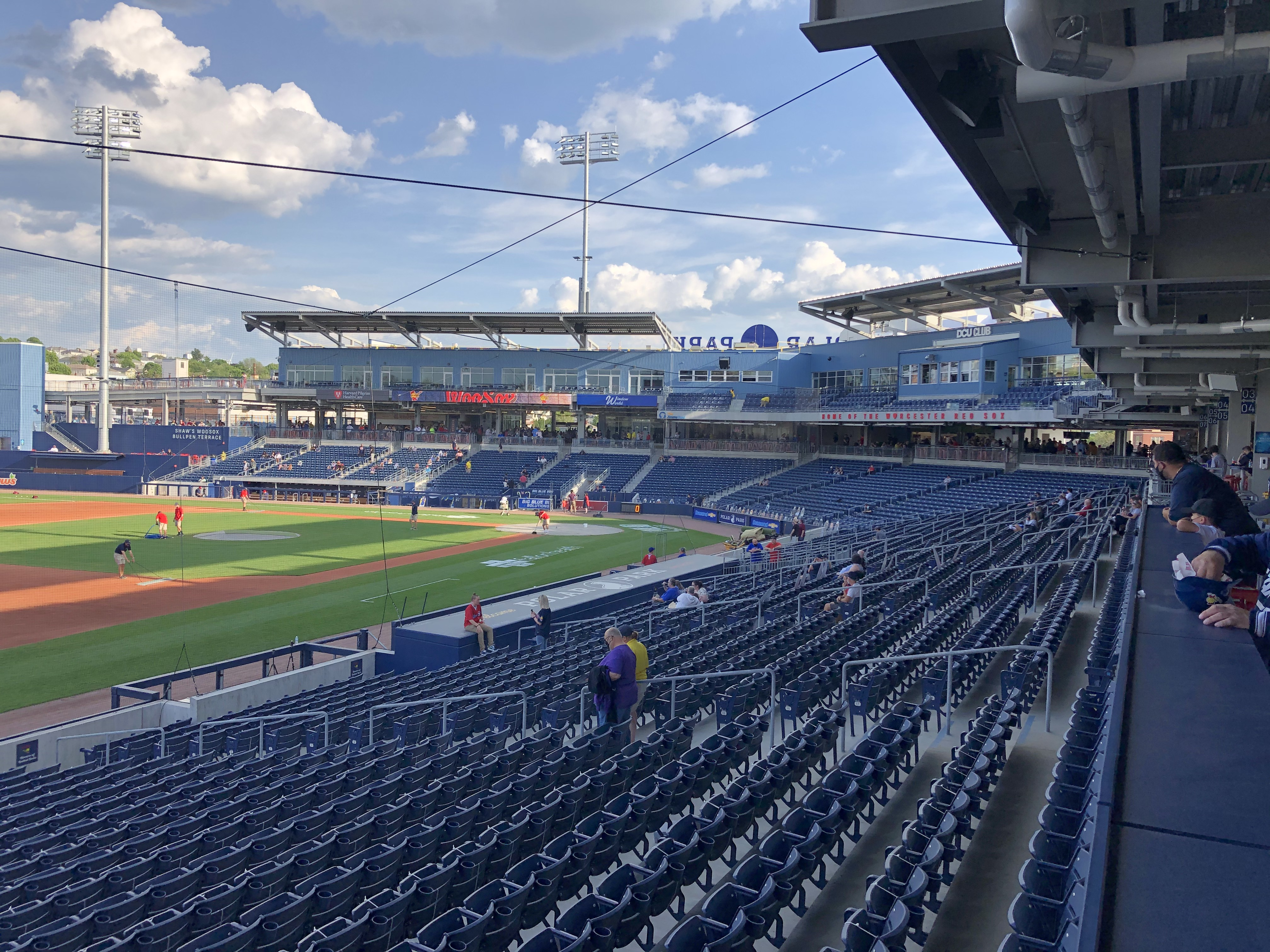

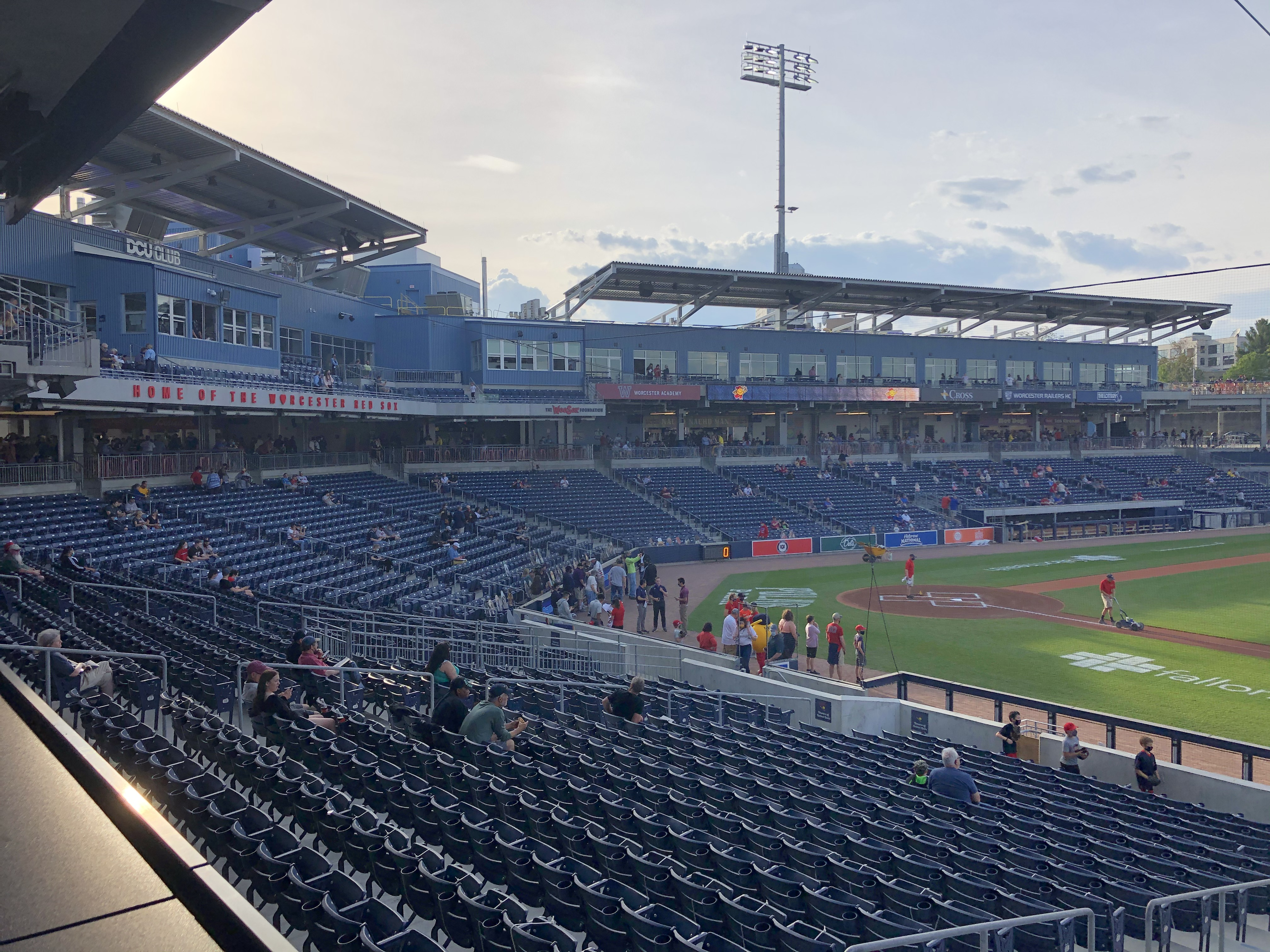

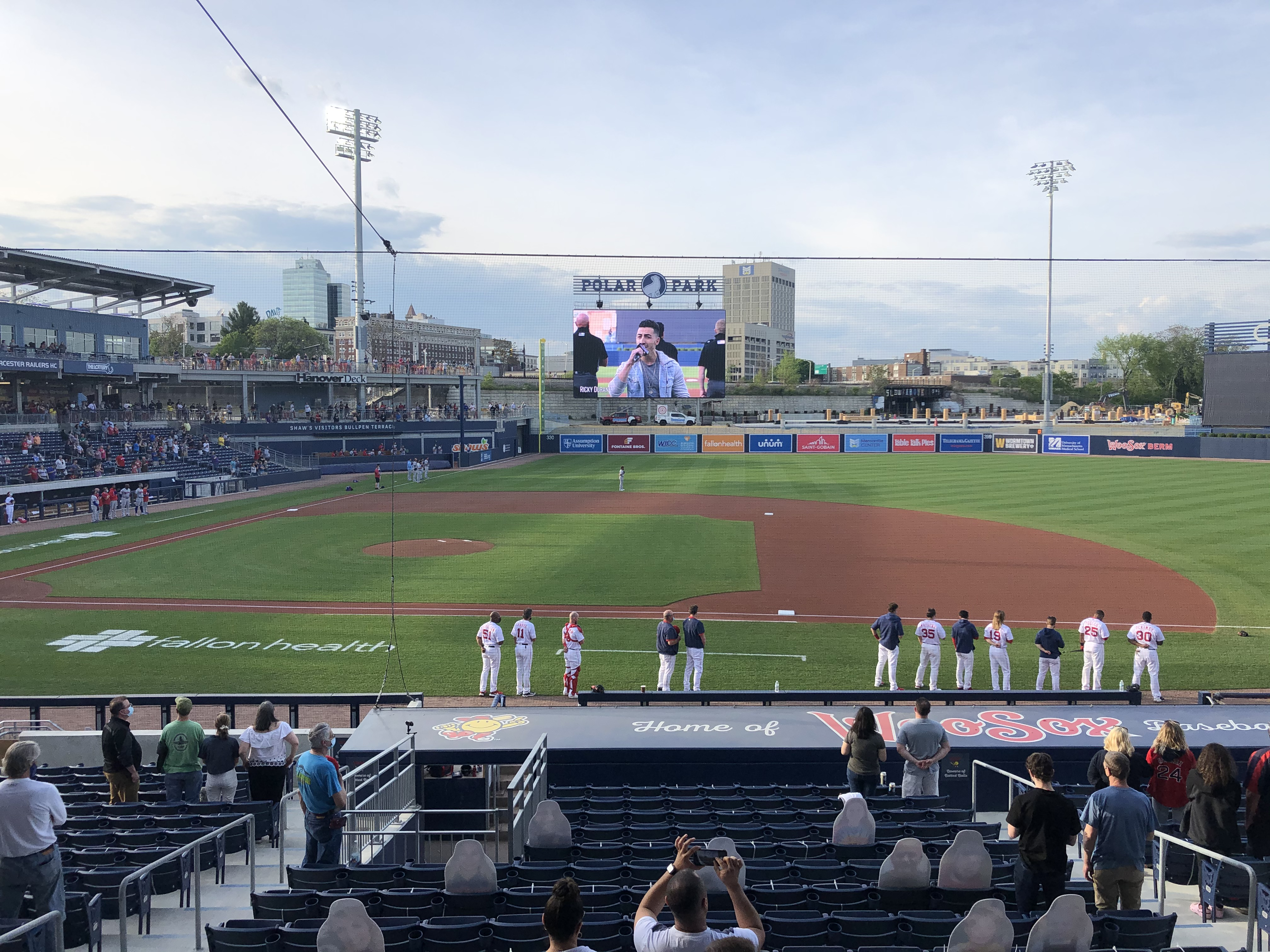

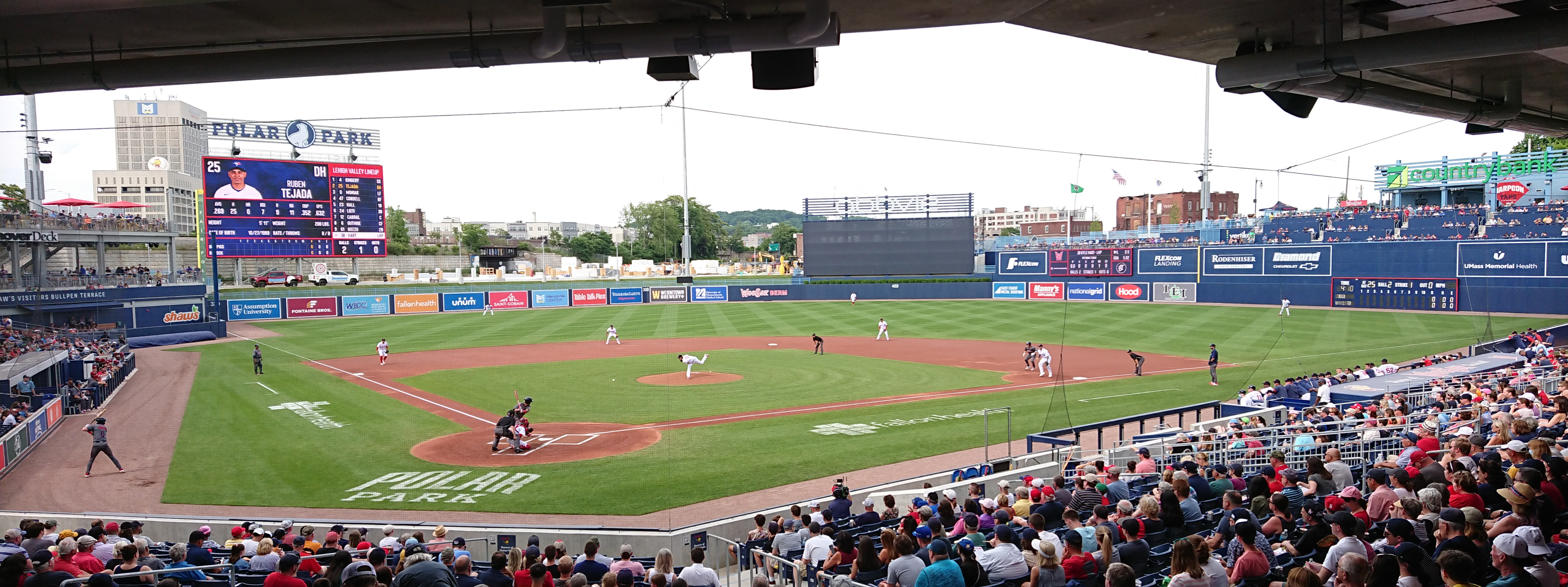
