= Massachusetts Route 122A =

State highway in Worcester County, Massachusetts, US

Route 122A
- Route 122A highlighted in red

Route information
- Auxiliary route of Route 122
- Maintained by MassDOT
- Length: 26.85 mi (43.21 km)

Major junctions
- South end: Route 122 in Grafton
- Route 146 / I-90 / Mass Pike / US 20 in Millbury; Route 146 / I-290 / Route 9 / Route 12 / Route 122 in Worcester; Route 31 / Route 68 in Holden; Route 56 in Rutland
- North end: Route 122 in Rutland

Location
- Country: United States
- State: Massachusetts
- Counties: Worcester

Highway system
- Massachusetts State Highway System; Interstate; US; State
← Route 122	→ Route 123

Route 122A is a 26.85-mile-long (43.21 km) southeast-northwest state highway in Massachusetts, in the United States. It is an alternate route of Massachusetts Route 122, with a mile-long concurrency with its parent route in downtown Worcester.

== Route description ==
Route 122A begins in the Farnumsville section of Grafton at its parent route. Route 122A heads westward, crossing the Blackstone River and following it through the northwest corner of Sutton and into Millbury. In Millbury, Route 122A crosses the river again, passing through the center of town before meeting Route 146, near the Shoppes at Blackstone Valley shopping center. The two routes travel northward, with a combined exit to U.S. Route 20 and the Massachusetts Turnpike (I-90) shortly after the merge, and just before the two routes enter Worcester.

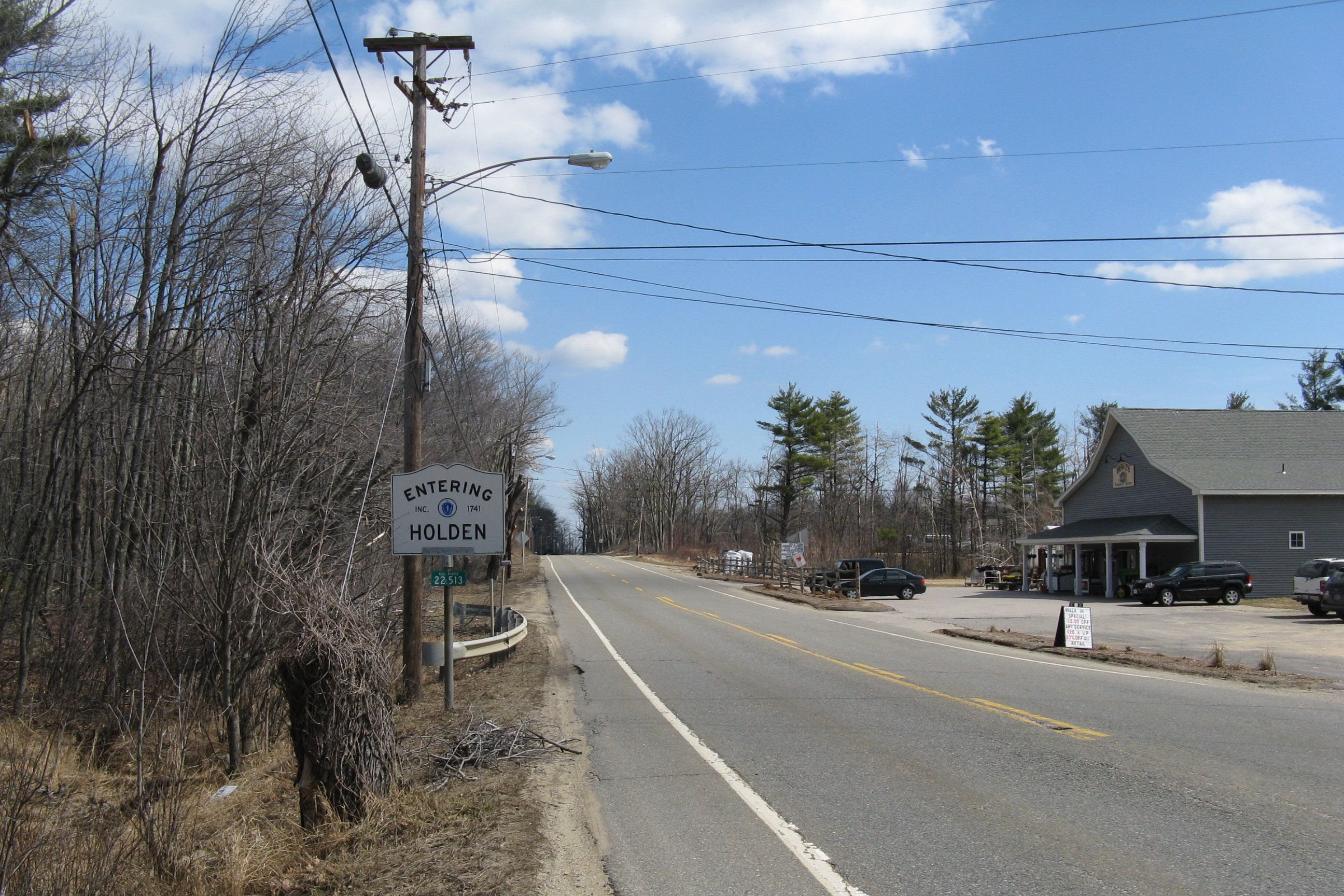
Eastbound entering Holden

In Worcester, Route 122A leaves Route 146 at Providence Street, following it and Winthrop Street until crossing I-290 at Exit 13. Just after this, Route 122A meets Route 122 at Kelley Square, running concurrently with its parent route westward past Polar Park until the two meet Route 9 and Route 12. Route 122A then turns northward concurrently with the two routes, with Route 9 leaving the concurrency a few blocks north, before Route 122A splits from Route 12, turning northwestward and following the shores of Indian Lake near Assumption College. Route 122A then enters the town of Holden.

Route 122A passes through Chaffinville and past Chaffin Pond before intersecting Route 31 at Holden Center. It continues northward, passing Eagle Lake and Stump Pond before meeting the southern end of Route 68. Route 122A bends westward into the town of Rutland, where it shares a short concurrency with Route 56 before finally ending at its parent route once more, in Rutland State Park.

== Major intersections ==
The entire route is in Worcester County.

Location	mi	km	Old exit	New exit	Destinations	Notes
Grafton	0.00	0.00			Route 122 – Grafton, Worcester, Uxbridge	Southern terminus
Millbury	5.8	9.3	9	17	Route 146 south – Uxbridge, Providence, RI	Southern terminus of concurrency with Route 146
Millbury	6.5	10.5	10	18	I-90 / Mass Pike / US 20 – Boston, Springfield, Northboro, Auburn	Exit 94 on I-90 / Mass Pike
Worcester	7.4	11.9	11	19	Millbury Street	Northbound exit and southbound entrance
Worcester	8.0	12.9	12	20	Route 146 north (Quinsigamond Ave.) to I-290 east – Boylston, Manchester, NH	Northern end of concurrency with Route 146
Worcester	9.7	15.6			I-290 to I-395 south / Route 9 / Route 146 south / I-190 north – Shrewsbury, Marlboro, Auburn, Norwich, CT	I-290 Exit 17
Worcester	9.8	15.8			Route 122 south – Kelley Square, Uxbridge	Eastern end of concurrency with Route 122
Worcester	11.1	17.9			Route 122 north – Paxton, Barre Route 9 west / Route 12 south – Leicester, Auburn	Western end of concurrency with Route 122; southern end of concurrency with Routes 9 & 12
Worcester	11.8	19.0			Route 9 east	Northern end of concurrency with Route 9
Worcester	13.4	21.6			Route 12 north to I-190 north / I-290 / I-395 south – West Boylston	Northern end of concurrency with Route 12
Holden	19.0	30.6			Route 31 – Princeton, Mt. Wachusett, Paxton	
Holden	21.0	33.8			Route 68 north – Hubbardston, Gardner	Southern terminus of Route 68
Rutland	24.4	39.3			Route 56 south – Paxton, Leicester	Eastern end of concurrency with Route 56
Rutland	24.5	39.4			Route 56 north – North Rutland, Hubbardston	Western end of concurrency with Route 56
Rutland	26.85	43.21			Route 122 – Oakham, Barre, Worcester	Northern terminus
1.000 mi = 1.609 km; 1.000 km = 0.621 mi: Concurrency terminus; Electronic toll collection; Incomplete access
