= Massachusetts Route 122 =

State highway in Massachusetts, US

Route 122
- Route 122 highlighted in red

Route information
- Maintained by MassDOT
- Length: 67.15 mi (108.07 km)

Major junctions
- South end: Route 122 at the Rhode Island state line in Blackstone
- Route 140 / Route 30 in Grafton; I-90 / Mass Pike in Millbury; US 20 / I-290 / Route 9 / Route 12 in Worcester; US 202 in New Salem/Orange; Route 2 in Orange
- North end: Route 2A in Orange

Location
- Country: United States
- State: Massachusetts
- Counties: Worcester, Franklin

Highway system
- Massachusetts State Highway System; Interstate; US; State
← Route 121	→ Route 122A

Route 122 is a 67.15-mile-long (108.07 km) southeast-northwest state highway in Massachusetts that is a continuation of Rhode Island Route 122. The highway is signed as south–north.

== Route description ==
Route 122 begins in Blackstone as a continuation of Rhode Island Route 122. The route passes along the Blackstone River through Blackstone and Millville as the main street through both towns. In Uxbridge the route crosses the river before meeting Route 146A at its northern terminus, in front of Uxbridge District Court. In the center of Uxbridge, the route intersects Route 16. From there, the route continues northward into Northbridge. Route 122 roughly bisects that town, crossing the Blackstone River again in the northern end of town.

From Northbridge, Route 122 enters the Worcester suburb of Grafton. In the Farnumsville section of town, Route 122A begins, splitting from its parent route and heading west into Sutton. Route 122, meanwhile, continues north, crossing through the center of town before becoming concurrent with Route 140 near Lake Ripple. The two routes split after nearly 1.5 miles (2.4 km), crossing under the Massachusetts Turnpike (I-90) without junction just before the split. From there, Route 122 turns west, crossing the corner of Millbury (where Exit 96 of the Mass Pike (old exit 11) meets the route) before entering the city of Worcester.

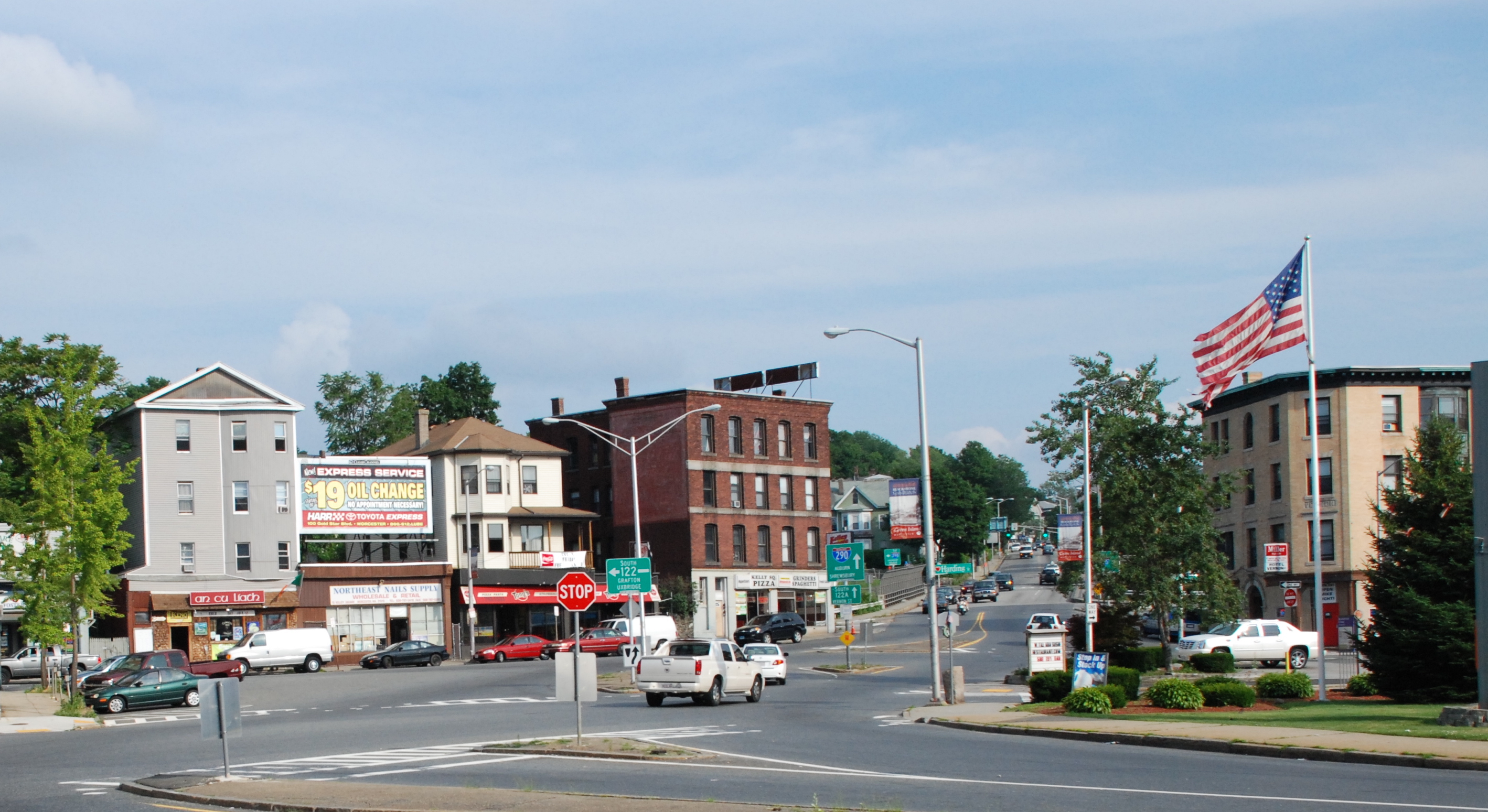
Intersection with Route 122A at Kelley Square in Worcester

Once in Worcester, Route 122 meets U.S. Route 20 at an above-grade intersection. It then passes through the southeastern corner of town before heading towards downtown. Once there, Route 122 crosses under I-290 at Exit 18 (formerly 14). The route then splits along two one-way streets before meeting Route 122A once more at Kelley Square. The two routes head westward, splitting when Route 122A joins a concurrency with Route 9 and Route 12. Route 122 then continues westward into the town of Paxton.

In Paxton, the route runs concurrently with Route 56 from near Kettle Brook Reservoir Number 4 to the center of town, where Route 56 joins Route 31 for a brief concurrency before those two routes split. Meanwhile, Route 122 heads northwestward past Moore State Park and into the town of Rutland. In Rutland, Route 122A finally ends at its parent route, near Long Pond and Rutland State Park. Route 122 turns westward through the park into the town of Oakham, where Route 122 meets the northern end of Route 148 before turning northward into Barre.

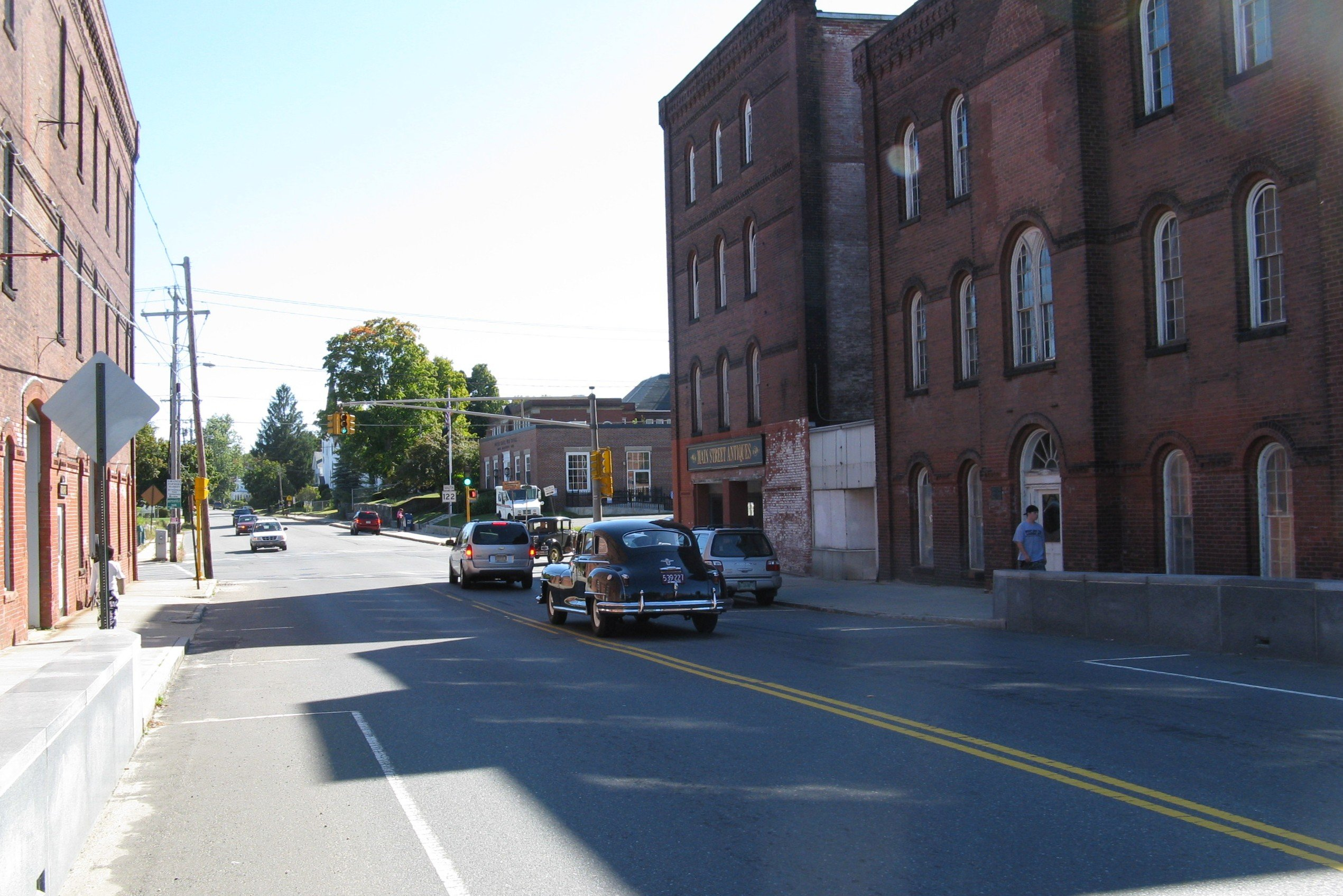
Route 122 southbound in Orange

In Barre, Route 122 becomes concurrent with Route 32, continuing through Barre Common (where Route 62 begins) and into Petersham. Near Petersham Center, Route 32 splits from Route 122, and Route 32A crosses the route shortly after. The route also crosses Turnpike Street, the former routing of Route 21 before the creation of the Quabbin Reservoir. In neighboring New Salem (in Franklin County), Route 122 becomes concurrent with U.S. Route 202. Approximately a mile later, the two routes split shortly after entering Orange. Route 122 turns northwest from there, crossing Route 2 at Exit 70 (formerly 15) before finally ending at Route 2A, just north of the Millers River in the center of town.

To celebrate Route 122 North becoming a State Scenic Byway, in October and November 2007, BJ Hill walked the 40-mile (64 km) corridor, beginning in downtown Orange and ending at Worcester State College. Along the way, he filmed the route, step by step, with a shoulder-mounted bullet cam.

== Major intersections ==
County	Location	mi	km	Destinations	Notes
Worcester	Blackstone	0.00	0.00	Route 122 south – Woonsocket	Continuation into Rhode Island
Worcester	Uxbridge	6.7	10.8	Route 146A south – North Smithfield, Providence, RI	Northern terminus of Route 146A
Worcester	Uxbridge	7.7	12.4	Route 16 to Route 146 – Mendon, Milford, East Douglas, Webster	
Worcester	Grafton	15.970	25.701	Route 122A north – Millbury, Worcester	Southern terminus of Route 122A
Worcester	Grafton	18.7	30.1	Route 140 south – Grafton Center, Upton	Southern end of Route 140 concurrency
Worcester	Grafton	20.1	32.3	Route 30 east / Route 140 north – Shrewsbury, Westboro	Northern end of Route 140 concurrency; western terminus of Route 30; To Route 135 via Route 30 east in westboro
Worcester	Millbury	21.8	35.1	I-90 / Mass Pike – Springfield, Boston	Exit 96 on I-90 / Mass Pike
Worcester	Worcester	22.426	36.091	US 20 to Route 146 – Marlboro, Auburn, Sturbridge	Above-grade interchange
Worcester	Worcester	25.6	41.2	I-290 east to Route 9 / I-190 north – Shrewsbury, Marlboro	Exit 18 on I-290
Worcester	Worcester	26.2	42.2	Route 122A south – Kelley Square	Southern end of Route 122A concurrency
Worcester	Worcester	27.370	44.048	Route 9 / Route 12 / Route 122A north – Leicester, Auburn	Northern end of Route 122A concurrency
Worcester	Paxton	33.0	53.1	Route 56 south – Leicester, Oxford	Southern end of Route 56 concurrency
Worcester	Paxton	34.3	55.2	Route 31 / Route 56 north – Rutland, Holden, Spencer, Charlton	Northern end of Route 56 concurrency
Worcester	Rutland	39.1	62.9	Route 122A south – Holden	Northern terminus of Route 122A
Worcester	Oakham	41.1	66.1	Route 148 south – Oakham, North Brookfield	Northern terminus of Route 148
Worcester	Barre	47.0	75.6	Route 32 south – Hardwick, Ware	Southern end of Route 32 concurrency
Worcester	Barre	48.1	77.4	Route 62 east – Princeton	Western terminus of Route 62
Worcester	Petersham	55.4	89.2	Route 32 north – Petersham Center, Athol	Northern end of Route 32 concurrency
Worcester	Petersham	55.9	90.0	Route 32A – Hardwick, Ware	
Worcester	Petersham	59.0	95.0	Route 21	Former intersection
Franklin	New Salem	63.4	102.0	US 202 south – New Salem, Shutesbury, Holyoke, Amherst	Southern end of US 202 concurrency
Franklin	Orange	64.3	103.5	US 202 north – Athol, Winchendon, Gardner	Northern end of US 202 concurrency
Franklin	Orange	64.9	104.4	Route 2 – Athol, Boston, Greenfield, North Adams	Exit 70 on Route 2
Franklin	Orange	67.15	108.07	Route 2A – Erving, Greenfield, Athol	Northern terminus; to Route 78 via west
1.000 mi = 1.609 km; 1.000 km = 0.621 mi: Closed/former; Concurrency terminus
