= New Hampshire Route 63 =

State highway in Cheshire County, New Hampshire, US

New Hampshire Route 63
- Map of Cheshire County in southwestern New Hampshire with NH 63 highlighted in red

Route information
- Maintained by NHDOT
- Length: 21.514 mi (34.623 km)
- Tourist routes: Connecticut River Byway

Major junctions
- South end: Route 63 in Northfield, MA
- NH 9 in Chesterfield
- North end: NH 12 in Westmoreland

Location
- Country: United States
- State: New Hampshire
- Counties: Cheshire

Highway system
- New Hampshire Highway System; Interstate; US; State; Turnpikes
| ← NH 51 | → NH 75 |

New Hampshire Route 63 is a 21.514-mile-long (34.623 km) north–south state highway in Cheshire County in southwestern New Hampshire. It runs from Winchester to Westmoreland. The southern terminus is in Winchester at the Massachusetts state line, where the road continues as Massachusetts Route 63 in the town of Northfield. The northern terminus of NH 63 is in Westmoreland at New Hampshire Route 12.

== Route description ==
After entering Winchester from Massachusetts, NH 63 immediately enters the town of Hinsdale after only a few feet of pavement. Following the narrow salient of Hinsdale between the Connecticut River and Winchester, it is known locally as Northfield Road. Crossing the Ashuelot River into the main village of Hinsdale, it has a T-intersection with Main Street and joins NH 119 for a short concurrency eastward. At the intersection of Main Street, Canal Street, and Chesterfield Road, NH 63 turns north onto Chesterfield Road while NH 119 continues east on Canal Street, Following Chesterfield Road north along the banks of Kilburn Brook, the road travels along the western edge of Pisgah State Park and enters the town of Chesterfield. At Spofford Lake, NH 63 intersects NH 9 (Franklin Pierce Highway) before passing north out of Chesterfield into Westmoreland. In the main village of Westmoreland, the road takes a hard turn to the northwest, then as it approaches the Connecticut River turns gradually back to the northeast in the village of Park Hill before coming to its northern terminus at NH 12.

== Major intersections ==
The entire route is in Cheshire County.

| Location | mi | km | Destinations | Notes |
|---|---|---|---|---|
| Winchester | 0.000 | 0.000 | Route 63 south (Hinsdale Road) / Connecticut River Byway – Northfield | Continuation from Massachusetts |
| Hinsdale | 4.706 | 7.574 | NH 119 west (Brattleboro Road) – Brattleboro VT | Southern end of concurrency with NH 119 |
| Hinsdale | 4.987 | 8.026 | NH 119 east (Canal Street) – Winchester, Richmond | Northern end of concurrency with NH 119 |
| Chesterfield | 13.279 | 21.370 | NH 9 (Franklin Pierce Highway) – Keene, Brattleboro VT | |
| Westmoreland | 21.514 | 34.623 | NH 12 / Connecticut River Byway – Keene, Walpole | Northern terminus |
1.000 mi = 1.609 km; 1.000 km = 0.621 mi: Concurrency terminus
