= Ashuelot =

Ashuelot may refer to:

- The Ashuelot River in New Hampshire, United States
  - The South Branch Ashuelot River in New Hampshire
  - Ashuelot Pond, near the source of the Ashuelot River
- Ashuelot, New Hampshire, a village along the river
- USS Ashuelot, a gunboat named for the river
- USRC Ashuelot, a US revenue cutter named for the river
