= New Hampshire Route 119 =

Highway in New Hampshire

Route 119
- Map of southwestern New Hampshire and southeastern Vermont with NH 119 and VT 119 highlighted in red

Route information
- Maintained by NHDOT
- Length: 39.976 mi (64.335 km): Vermont: 0.0665 mi (0.1070 km); New Hampshire: 39.908 mi (64.226 km)

Major junctions
- West end: VT 142 in Brattleboro, VT
- US 202 in Rindge, NH
- East end: Route 119 at the Massachusetts state line near Rindge, NH

Location
- Country: United States
- State: New Hampshire
- Counties: VT: Windham, NH: Cheshire, Hillsborough

Highway system
- New Hampshire Highway System; Interstate; US; State; Turnpikes
← NH 118	→ NH 120
← VT 118	VT	→ VT 120

New Hampshire Route 119 (NH 119) is a state highway in the U.S. state of New Hampshire. The highway begins in Hinsdale at the Connecticut River, across which the highway continues into Brattleboro, Vermont, as Vermont Route 119 (VT 119) for 0.080 miles (0.129 km) to its terminus at VT 142. NH 119 heads east 39.908 miles (64.226 km) to the Massachusetts state line at the Rindge/New Ipswich town corner, where the highway continues as Massachusetts Route 119. The state highway is the main east–west highway of southern Cheshire County, where it connects the towns of Hinsdale, Winchester, Richmond, Fitzwilliam, and Rindge.

== Route description ==
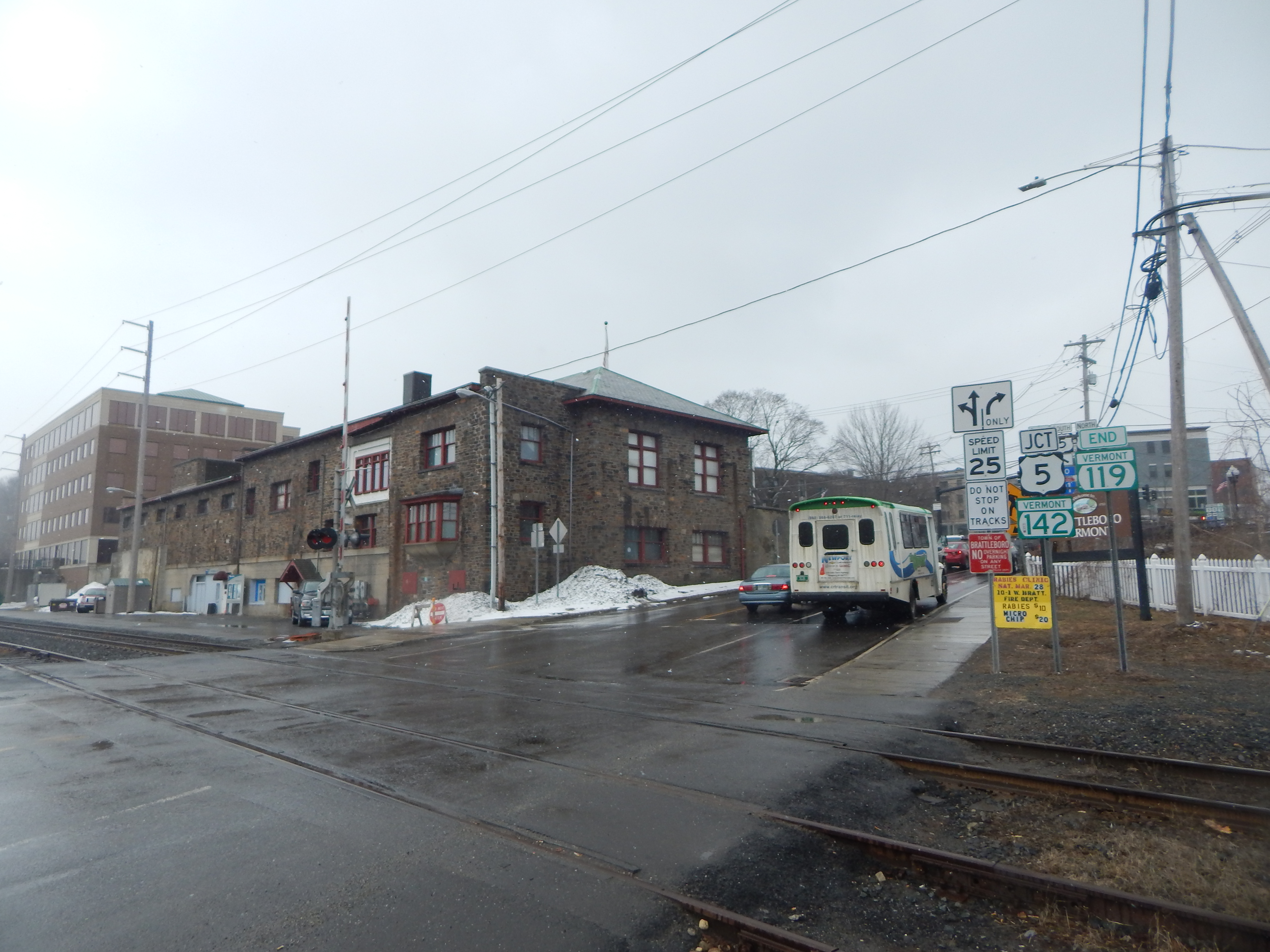
VT 119 approaching its former western terminus in Brattleboro. The terminus has been moved to VT 142.

NH 119 begins at the Vermont state line at the west bank of the Connecticut River. The highway continues for a short distance as VT 119 into downtown Brattleboro, where the highway terminates at Vermont Route 142.

NH 119 crosses the New England Central Railroad and the Connecticut River on the General John Stark Memorial Bridge. The highway, which is named Brattleboro Road, follows the east bank of the river southeast along the flank of Wantastiquet Mountain through the town of Hinsdale. West of the center of town, NH 119 veers east away from the Connecticut River and becomes the town's Main Street. While passing through downtown, the highway has a concurrency with NH 63, which heads south as Northfield Road and north as Chesterfield Road.

NH 119 parallels the Ashuelot River east from the town center along Canal Street and becomes Ashuelot Main Street on entering the town of Winchester. East of the village of Ashuelot, which contains a namesake covered bridge, the highway continues as Hinsdale Road to the town center of Winchester. There, the highway crosses the river and has a four-leg intersection with NH 10 (Manning Hill Road) and NH 78 (Warwick Road). NH 119 and NH 10 head north across Mirey Brook as Main Street to the center of town, where NH 10 continues straight on Keene Road and NH 119 turns east onto Richmond Street. The highway crosses several hills and ridges in the town of Richmond, in the center of which the highway intersects NH 32 (Athol Road/Old Homestead Highway). The highway is named Winchester Road and Fitzwilliam Road west and east of the town center, respectively.

NH 119 enters the town of Fitzwilliam, where the highway passes to the south of Rhododendron State Park, which surrounds Little Monadnock Mountain. The highway has a curvaceous path through the town that includes two right-angle turns west of the town center, where the highway intersects NH 12. NH 119 continues east into the town of Rindge. The route passes to the south of Franklin Pierce University before having a junction with US 202. NH 119 continues southeast, passing the town center of Rindge to the northeast and the Wapack Wilderness, the site of several monadnocks in the Wapack Range, including Pratt Mountain. The state highway cuts across the extreme southwest corner of the town of New Ipswich in Hillsborough County before reaching its eastern terminus at the Massachusetts state line. The highway continues southeast into the town of Ashburnham as Massachusetts Route 119 (Rindge State Road).

== Major intersections ==
County	Location	mi	km	Destinations	Notes
Windham	Brattleboro	0.000	0.000	VT 142 (Vernon Street) to US 5 / I-91 / VT 9 / VT 30 – Vernon	Western terminus of VT 119
Vermont–New Hampshire state line		0.080 0.000	0.129 0.000	General John Stark Memorial Bridge	
Cheshire	Hinsdale	6.712	10.802	NH 63 south (Northfield Road) – Northfield, MA	Western end of NH 63 concurrency
Cheshire	Hinsdale	6.993	11.254	NH 63 north (Chesterfield Road) – Chesterfield	Eastern end of NH 63 concurrency
Cheshire	Winchester	12.518	20.146	NH 10 south (Manning Hill Road) / NH 78 south (Warwick Road) – Northfield, MA, Warwick, MA	Western end of NH 10 concurrency; northern terminus of NH 78
Cheshire	Winchester	13.067	21.029	NH 10 north (Keene Road) – Keene	Eastern end of NH 10 concurrency
Cheshire	Richmond	19.286	31.038	NH 32 (Athol Road / Old Homestead Highway) – Keene, Athol, MA	
Cheshire	Fitzwilliam	27.577	44.381	NH 12 – Keene, Winchendon, MA	
Cheshire	Rindge	33.078	53.234	US 202 – Jaffrey, Winchendon, MA	
Hillsborough	New Ipswich	39.908	64.226	Route 119 east (Rindge State Road) – Ashburnham	Continuation into Massachusetts
1.000 mi = 1.609 km; 1.000 km = 0.621 mi: Concurrency terminus; Route transition
