= Hinsdale (CDP), New Hampshire =

Census-designated place in New Hampshire, United States

Hinsdale, New Hampshire
- Census-designated place
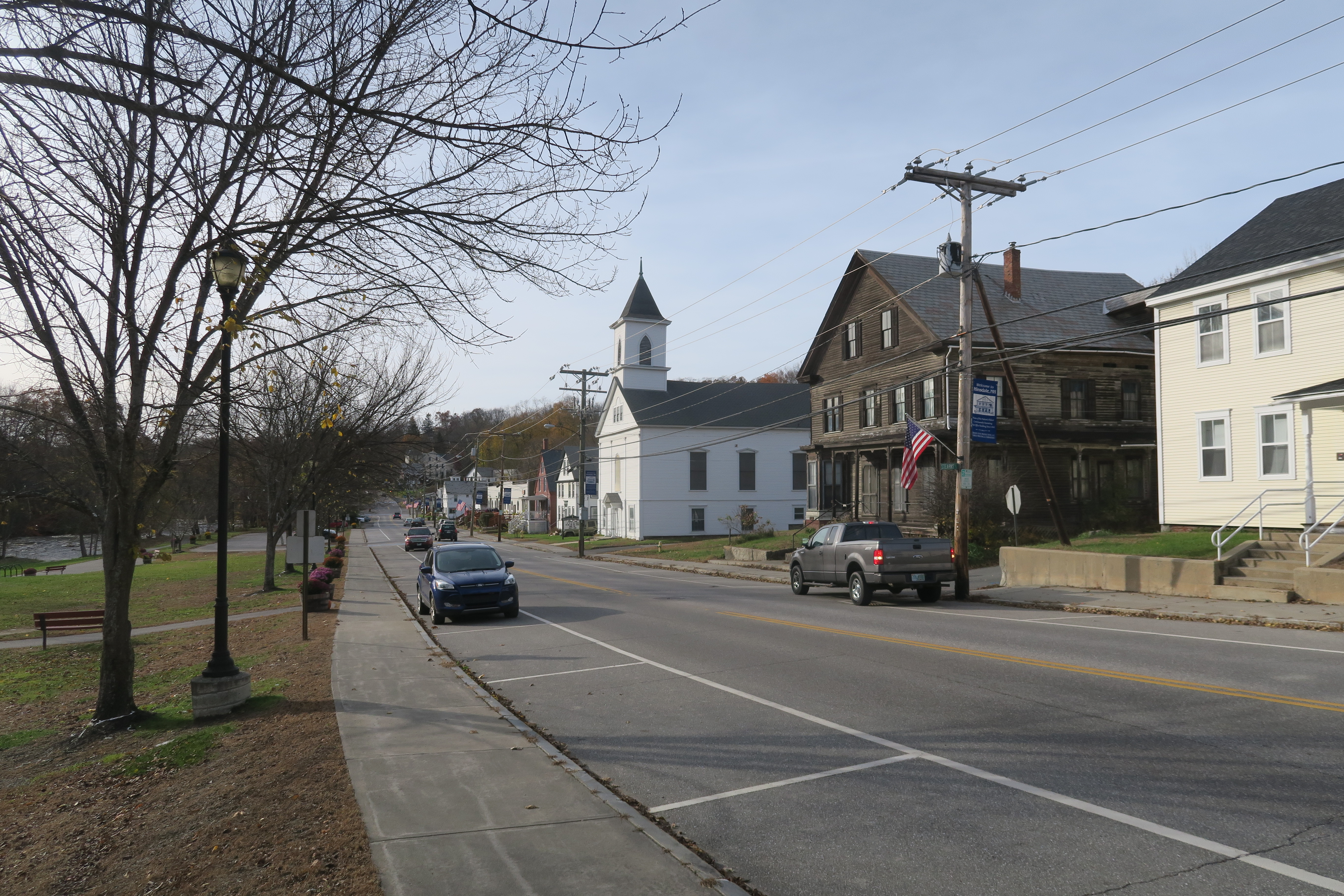
- Main Street

- Location within New Hampshire Location within the United States
- Coordinates: 42°47′19″N 72°29′18″W
- Country: United States
- State: New Hampshire
- County: Cheshire
- Town: Hinsdale

Area
  - Total: 2.40 sq mi (6.21 km^{2})
  - Land: 2.32 sq mi (6.02 km^{2})
  - Water: 0.077 sq mi (0.20 km^{2})
- Elevation: 358 ft (109 m)

Population (2020)
  - Total: 1,485
  - Density: 639.4/sq mi (246.87/km^{2})
- Time zone: UTC-5 (Eastern (EST))
  - Summer (DST): UTC-4 (EDT)
- ZIP code: 03451
- Area code: 603
- FIPS code: 33-36580
- GNIS feature ID: 2378072

Hinsdale is a census-designated place (CDP) and the main village in the town of Hinsdale, New Hampshire, United States. The population of the CDP was 1,485 at the 2020 census, out of 3,948 in the entire town of Hinsdale.

== Geography ==
The CDP is in the south-central part of the town of Hinsdale, between the Connecticut River to the west and the Winchester town line to the east. The Ashuelot River, a tributary of the Connecticut, flows through the eastern and southern part of the CDP. New Hampshire Route 119 passes through the center of the village as Brattleboro Road, Main Street, and Canal Street; it leads east 6 miles (10 km) to Winchester and northwest 7 miles (11 km) to Brattleboro, Vermont. New Hampshire Route 63 joins Route 119 along Main Street in the center of Hinsdale, but leads north 8 miles (13 km) to Chesterfield and south 7 miles (11 km) to Northfield, Massachusetts.

According to the U.S. Census Bureau, the Hinsdale CDP has a total area of 2.4 square miles (6.2 km^{2}), of which 2.3 square miles (6.0 km^{2}) are land and 0.1 square miles (0.2 km^{2}), or 3.20%, are water.

== Demographics ==
Historical population
Census	Pop.	Note	%±
1950	1,247		—
1960	1,235		−1.0%
1970	1,059		−14.3%
1980	1,546		46.0%
1990	1,718		11.1%
2000	1,713		−0.3%
2010	1,548		−9.6%
2020	1,485		−4.1%
U.S. Decennial Census

As of the census of 2010, there were 1,548 people, 666 households, and 393 families residing in the Hinsdale CDP. There were 733 housing units, of which 67, or 9.1%, were vacant. The racial makeup of the town was 97.5% White, 0.5% African American, 0.1% Native American, 0.3% Asian, 0.2% Pacific Islander, 0.8% some other race, and 0.6% from two or more races. 1.2% of the population were Hispanic or Latino of any race.

Of the 666 households in the CDP, 30.3% had children under the age of 18 living with them, 42.0% were headed by married couples living together, 11.9% had a female householder with no husband present, and 41.0% were non-families. 31.4% of all households were made up of individuals, and 13.5% were someone living alone who was 65 years of age or older. The average household size was 2.32, and the average family size was 2.92.

22.8% of people in the CDP were under the age of 18, 8.5% were from 18 to 24, 23.7% were from 25 to 44, 29.8% were from 45 to 64, and 15.2% were 65 years of age or older. The median age was 41.7 years. For every 100 females, there were 93.0 males. For every 100 females age 18 and over, there were 88.8 males.

For the period 2011–15, the estimated median annual income for a household was $38,981, and the median income for a family was $59,176. The per capita income for the town was $21,355. 10.5% of the population and 2.7% of families were below the poverty line, along with 4.0% of people under the age of 18 and 15.7% of people 65 or older.
