= Winchester (CDP), New Hampshire =

Census-designated place in New Hampshire, United States

Winchester, New Hampshire
- Census-designated place
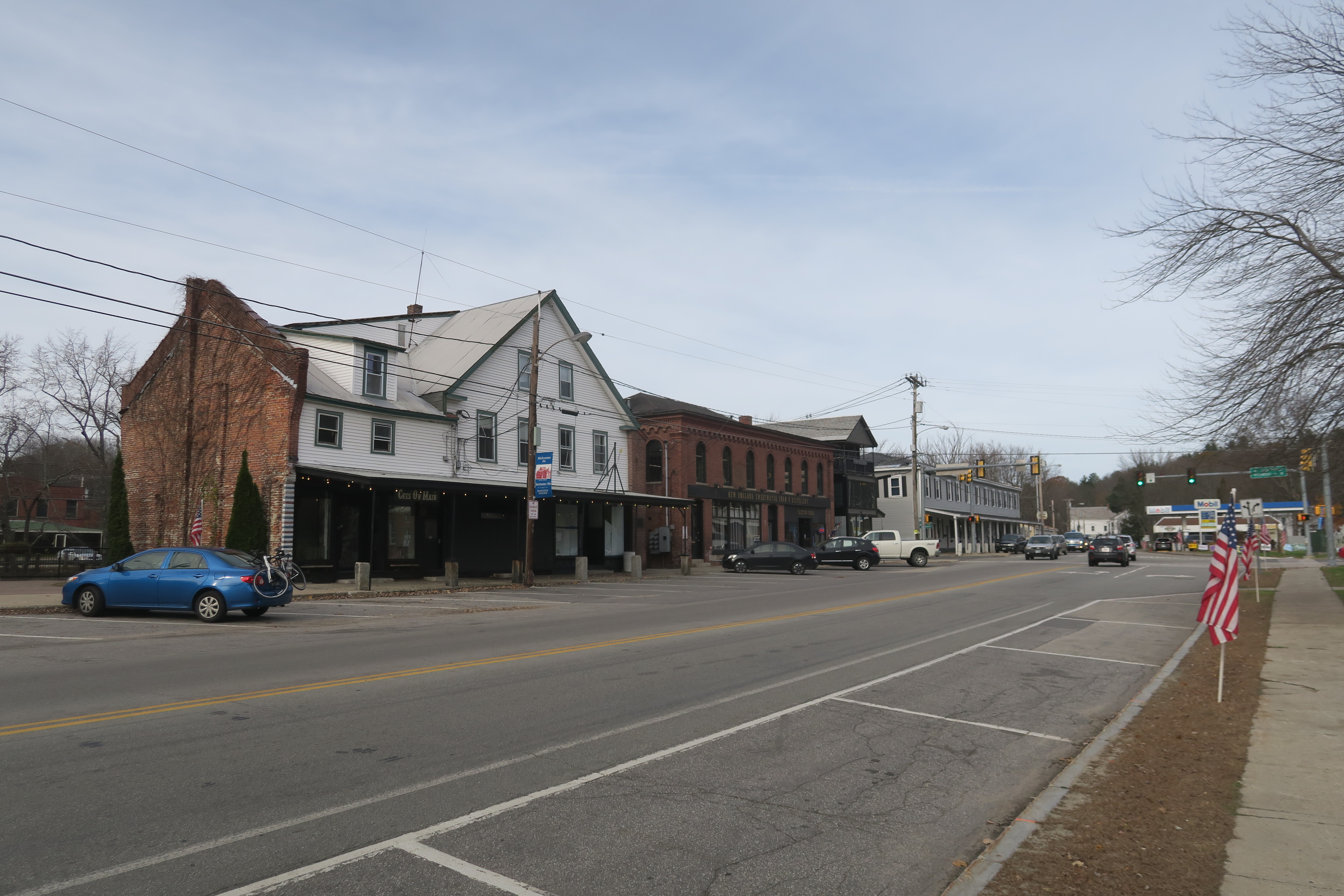
- Main Street

- Location within New Hampshire Location within the United States
- Coordinates: 42°46′24″N 72°22′59″W
- Country: United States
- State: New Hampshire
- County: Cheshire
- Town: Winchester

Area
  - Total: 2.98 sq mi (7.73 km^{2})
  - Land: 2.98 sq mi (7.71 km^{2})
  - Water: 0.0077 sq mi (0.02 km^{2})
- Elevation: 446 ft (136 m)

Population (2020)
  - Total: 1,606
  - Density: 539.3/sq mi (208.23/km^{2})
- Time zone: UTC-5 (Eastern (EST))
  - Summer (DST): UTC-4 (EDT)
- ZIP code: 03470
- Area code: 603
- FIPS code: 33-85460
- GNIS feature ID: 2378097

Winchester is a census-designated place (CDP) and the main village in the town of Winchester, New Hampshire, United States. The population of the CDP was 1,606 at the 2020 census, compared to 4,150 in the entire town.

== Geography ==
The CDP is in the central part of the town of Winchester, on both sides of the Ashuelot River, a tributary of the Connecticut River. The northern edge of the CDP is north of Clark Road, Old Westport Road, and Spruce Lane, while the eastern edge follows Forest Lake Road and extends east along New Hampshire Route 119 as far as Scotland Road. The southern border of the CDP follows Roaring Brook, Mirey Brook, and the Ashuelot River to a tributary brook that is west of the densely settled part of the town.

New Hampshire Route 10 is the main road through the CDP, leading north 13 miles (21 km) to Keene and southwest 7 miles (11 km) to Northfield, Massachusetts. Route 119 follows Route 10 through part of the CDP, but leads east 14 miles (23 km) to Fitzwilliam and west 6 miles (10 km) to Hinsdale. New Hampshire Route 78 leaves Route 10 just south of the CDP and leads south 14 miles (23 km) to Orange, Massachusetts.

According to the U.S. Census Bureau, the Winchester CDP has a total area of 3.0 square miles (7.7 km^{2}), of which 0.01 square miles (0.02 km^{2}), or 0.28%, are water.

== Demographics ==
Historical population
| Census | Pop. | Note | %± |
|---|---|---|---|
| 1980 | 1,732 | | — |
| 1990 | 1,735 | | 0.2% |
| 2000 | 1,832 | | 5.6% |
| 2010 | 1,733 | | −5.4% |
| 2020 | 1,606 | | −7.3% |
U.S. Decennial Census

As of the census of 2010, there were 1,733 people, 682 households, and 439 families residing in the CDP. There were 738 housing units, of which 56, or 7.6%, were vacant. The racial makeup of the town was 96.2% White, 0.5% African American, 0.4% Native American, 0.2% Asian, 0.0% Pacific Islander, 0.9% some other race, and 1.9% from two or more races. 1.8% of the population were Hispanic or Latino of any race.

Of the 682 households in the CDP, 35.0% had children under the age of 18 living with them, 40.3% were headed by married couples living together, 16.0% had a female householder with no husband present, and 35.6% were non-families. 27.0% of all households were made up of individuals, and 11.5% were someone living alone who was 65 years of age or older. The average household size was 2.54, and the average family size was 3.02.

24.9% of people in the CDP were under the age of 18, 10.0% were from 18 to 24, 26.0% were from 25 to 44, 26.6% were from 45 to 64, and 12.6% were 65 years of age or older. The median age was 37.3 years. For every 100 females, there were 98.3 males. For every 100 females age 18 and over, there were 93.8 males.

For the period 2011–15, the estimated median annual income for a household was $52,935, and the median income for a family was $54,596. Male full-time workers had a median income of $45,594 versus $39,886 for females. The per capita income for the CDP was $26,134. 18.5% of the population and 18.1% of families were below the poverty line, along with 27.6% of people under the age of 18 and 20.1% of people 65 or older.
