= Massachusetts Route 78 =

State highway in Franklin County, Massachusetts, US

Route 78
- Route 78 highlighted in red

Route information
- Maintained by MassDOT
- Length: 9.73 mi (15.66 km)

Major junctions
- South end: Route 2A in Orange
- North end: NH 78 in Winchester, NH

Location
- Country: United States
- State: Massachusetts
- Counties: Franklin

Highway system
- Massachusetts State Highway System; Interstate; US; State
← Route 75	→ Route 79

Route 78 is a state highway in the U.S. state of Massachusetts. The highway runs 9.73 miles (15.66 km) from Route 2A in Orange north to the New Hampshire state line in Warwick in northeastern Franklin County where it continues as New Hampshire Route 78.

== Route description ==
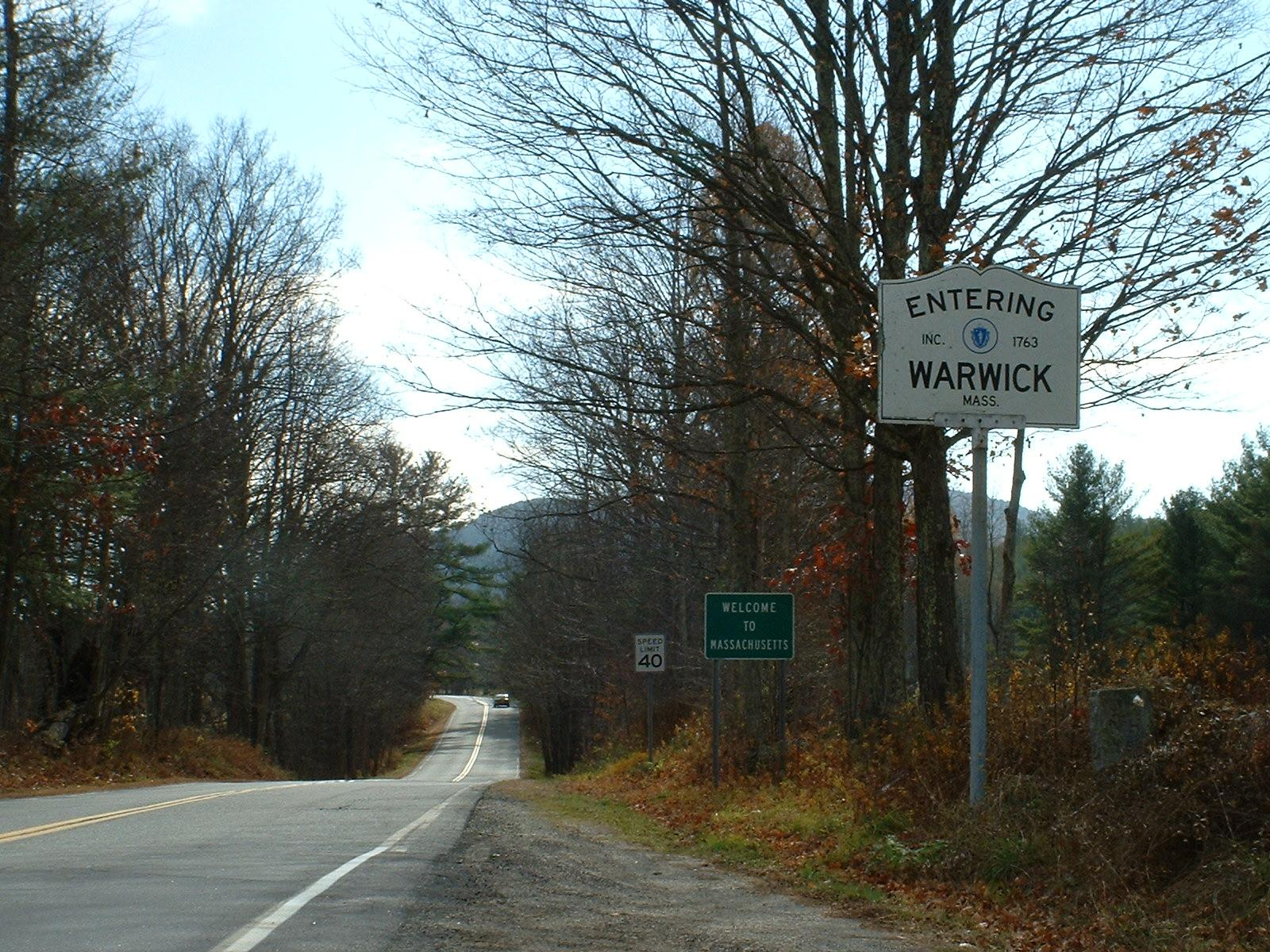
Southbound Route 78 at its northern terminus

Route 78 begins at Route 2A (Orange Road) in the town of Orange just north of the Springfield Terminal railroad tracks and the Millers River. The two-lane highway heads north as Warwick Road into the town of the same name, where its name changes to Orange Road. Route 78 passes Wheelers Pond on its way to the town center of Warwick, where its name changes to Winchester Road. The highway passes through Mount Grace State Forest and by Mount Grace before reaching its northern terminus at the New Hampshire state line, where the highway continues as New Hampshire Route 78 into the town of Winchester.

== Major Intersections ==
The entire route is in Franklin County.

Location	mi	km	Destinations	Notes
Orange	0.00	0.00	Route 2A (Orange Road) – Orange, Erving	Southern terminus; To Route 2 and Route 122
Warwick	9.73	15.66	NH 78 north – Winchester	Continuation into New Hampshire
1.000 mi = 1.609 km; 1.000 km = 0.621 mi
