= Winchendon =

Winchendon may refer to:

== Places ==
In the United Kingdom:

- Nether Winchendon, Buckinghamshire
- Upper Winchendon, Buckinghamshire

In the United States:

- Winchendon, Massachusetts, a New England town
  - Winchendon (CDP), Massachusetts, the main village in the town

== Other uses ==
- Baron Wharton, a title in the Peerage of England
