= NH 63 =

NH 63 may refer to:

- National Highway 63 (India)
- New Hampshire Route 63, United States
