= NH 78 =

NH 78 may refer to:

- National Highway 78 (India)
- New Hampshire Route 78, United States
