= General John Stark Memorial Bridge =

Connecticut River overpass

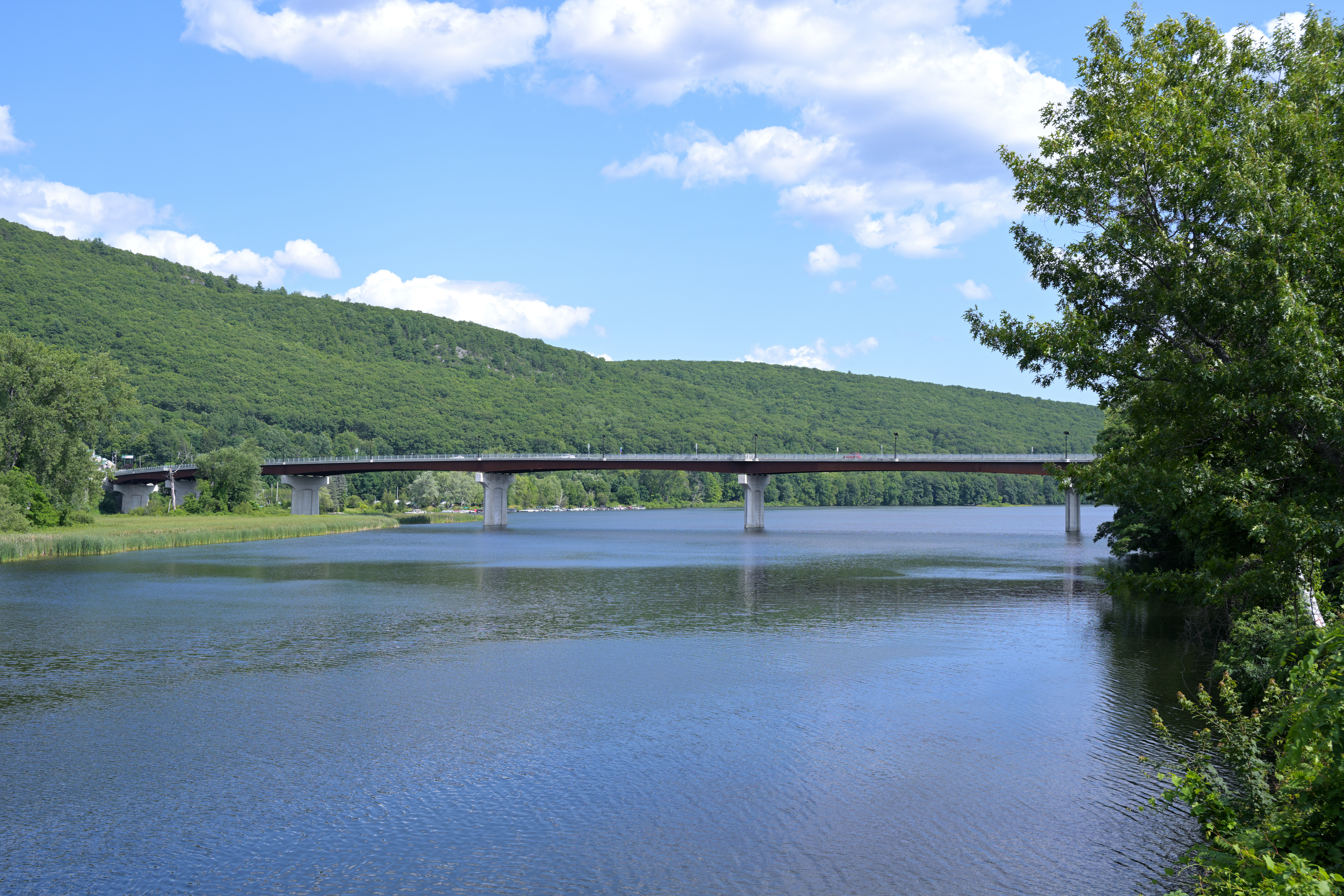
- The bridge in 2026, as seen from the west bank
- Coordinates: 42.85009°N 72.55185°W
- Carries: VT 119 and NH 119
- Crosses: Connecticut River
- Locale: connecting Brattleboro, Vermont and Hinsdale, New Hampshire

Characteristics
- Total length: 1,800 feet (550 m)

History
- Replaces: Anna Hunt Marsh Bridge and Charles Dana Bridge

Location
- Interactive map of General John Stark Memorial Bridge

The General John Stark Memorial Bridge is a bridge that crosses the Connecticut River between Brattleboro, Vermont, and Hinsdale, New Hampshire, in the United States. The bridge, which connects Vermont Route 119 and New Hampshire Route 119, replaces the Anna Hunt Marsh Bridge and the Charles Dana Bridge which formerly connected these routes. The Dana and Marsh bridges will become bicycling and pedestrian paths.

The bridge opened for traffic on Thursday, December 5, 2024.

== History ==
A replacement for the Anna Hunt Marsh Bridge (Brattleboro to Hinsdale Island) and the Charles Dana Bridge (Hinsdale Island to mainland Hinsdale) had been under consideration since the 1970s, but due to right of way and funding issues, was delayed until 2017, when state transportation officials released plans for a new structure.

== See also ==
- List of crossings of the Connecticut River
