= New Hampshire Route 78 =

State highway in Cheshire County, New Hampshire, US

New Hampshire Route 78
- Map of Cheshire County in southwestern New Hampshire with NH 78 highlighted in red

Route information
- Maintained by NHDOT
- Length: 3.456 mi (5.562 km)

Major junctions
- South end: Route 78 in Warwick, MA
- North end: NH 10 / NH 119 in Winchester

Location
- Country: United States
- State: New Hampshire
- Counties: Cheshire

Highway system
- New Hampshire Highway System; Interstate; US; State; Turnpikes
← NH 77	→ NH 84

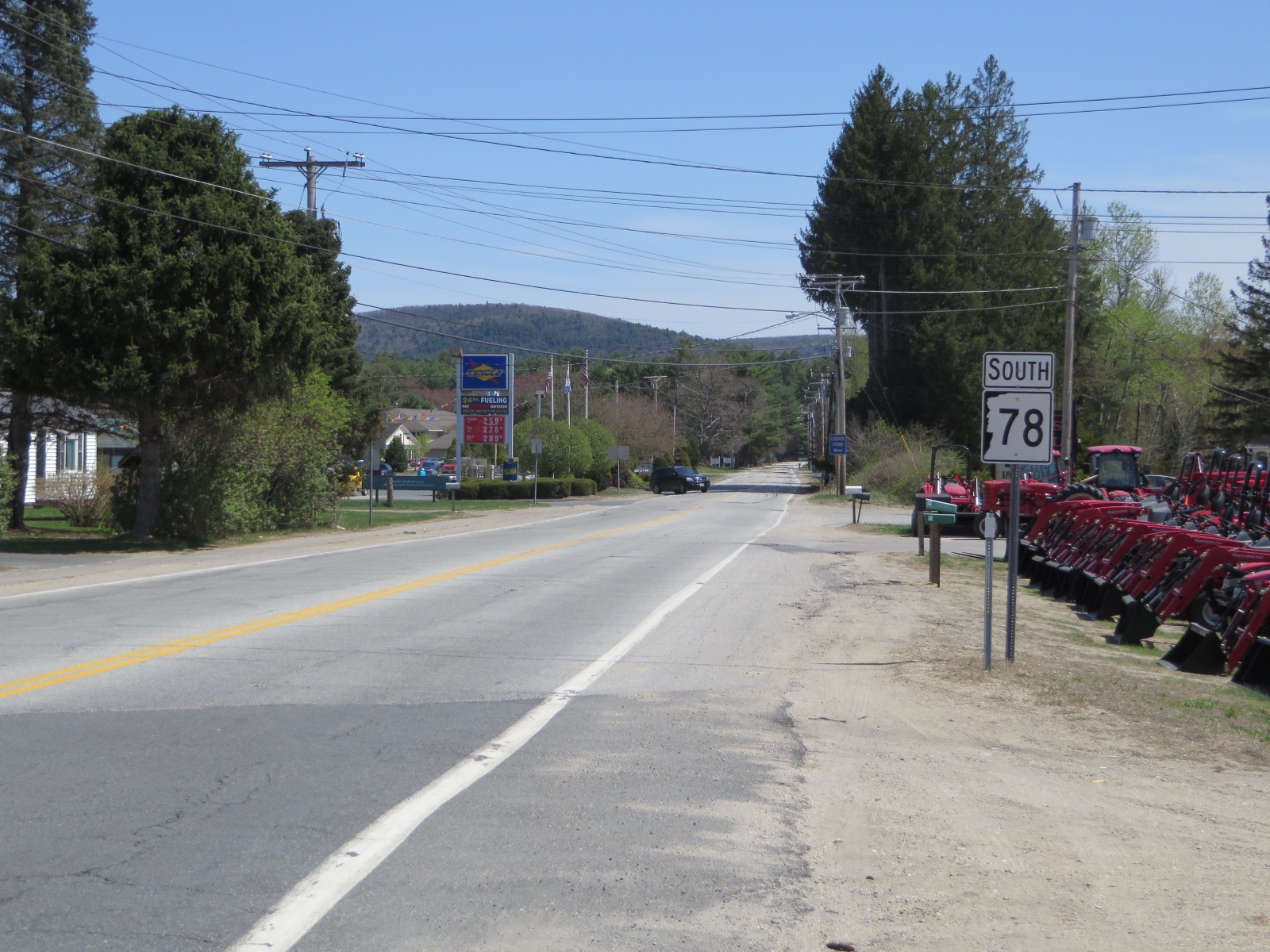
Northern start of NH 78 in Winchester, NH

New Hampshire Route 78 (abbreviated NH 78) is a 3.456-mile-long (5.562 km) secondary state highway in Cheshire County, New Hampshire, United States. A northward extension of Massachusetts Route 78, NH 78 runs entirely within the town of Winchester from the state border to downtown, where it ends at New Hampshire Route 10 and New Hampshire Route 119.

== Route description ==
NH 78 begins at the Massachusetts–New Hampshire state border where it meets the northern end of Massachusetts Route 78. The short highway runs for just under 3.5 miles northwest to downtown Winchester, where it ends at its intersection with NH 10 and NH 119. There are no major intersections between its endpoints.

== Junction list ==
The entire route is in Winchester, Cheshire County.

mi	km	Destinations	Notes
0.000	0.000	Route 78 south (Winchester Road) – Warwick	Continuation from Massachusetts
3.456	5.562	NH 10 south (Manning Hill Road) – Northfield MA NH 119 west (Gen. James Reed Highway) – Hinsdale, Brattleboro VT NH 10 north / NH 119 east (Main Street) – Keene	Northern terminus
1.000 mi = 1.609 km; 1.000 km = 0.621 mi
