= Slate Covered Bridge =

Covered bridge in Swanzey, New Hampshire, US

- U.S. National Register of Historic Places
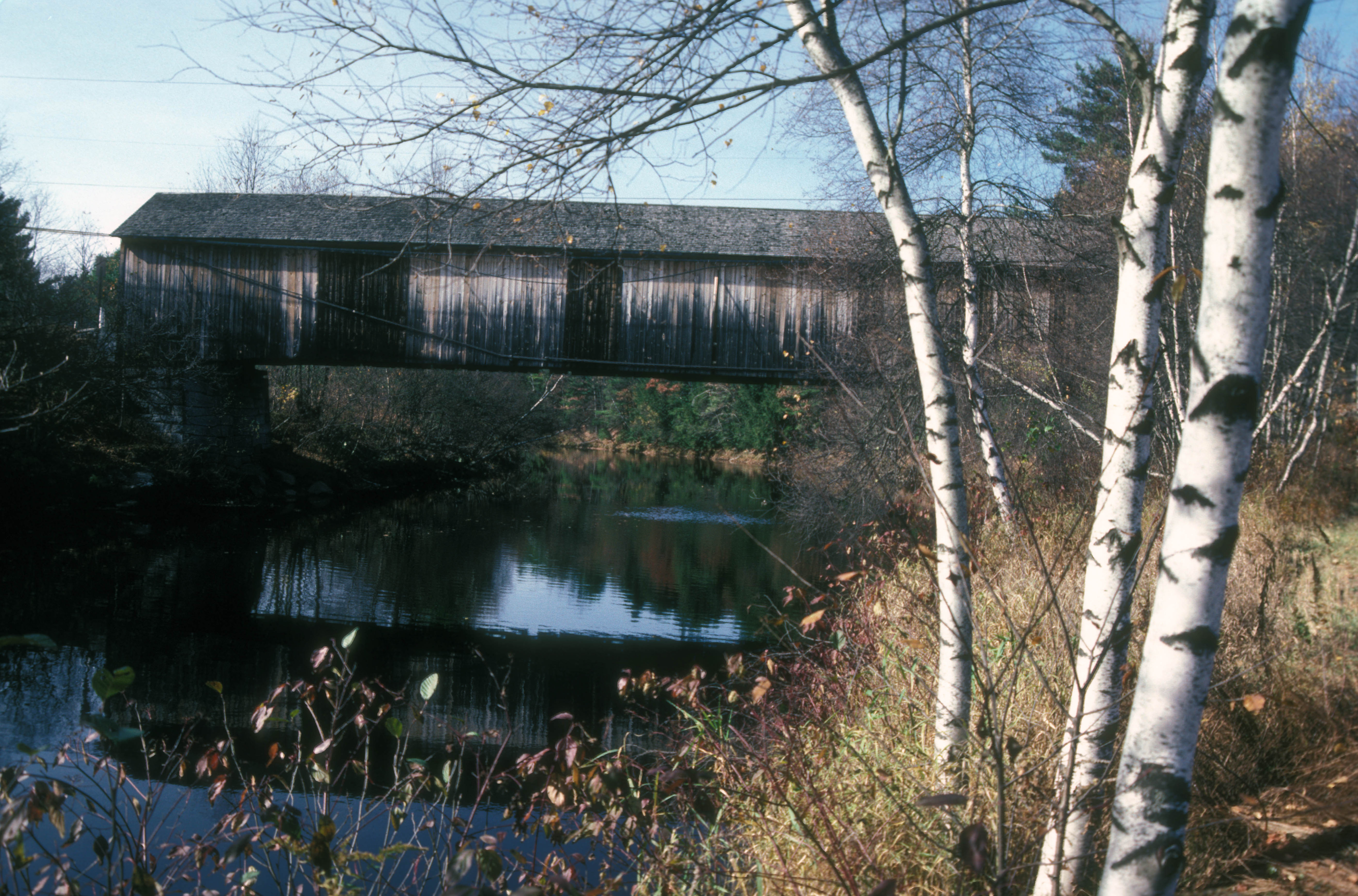
- The 1862 bridge, in 1970

- Location within New Hampshire Location within the United States
- Location: Westport Village Road over the Ashuelot River, Westport, New Hampshire
- Coordinates: 42°50′50″N 72°20′25″W
- Area: less than one acre
- Built: 1862
- Architectural style: Town lattice truss
- NRHP reference No.: 78000212
- Added to NRHP: November 14, 1978

The Slate Covered Bridge is a wooden covered bridge which carries the Westport Village Road over the Ashuelot River in Westport, a village of Swanzey, New Hampshire. The bridge was built in 2001, as a replacement for an 1862 bridge that was destroyed by arson fire in 1993. The 1862 bridge, one of New Hampshire's small number of surviving 19th-century covered bridges, was listed on the National Register of Historic Places in 1978.

== Description and history ==
The Slate Covered Bridge is located in southwestern Swanzey, carrying Westport Village Road (formerly an alignment of New Hampshire Route 10) over the Ashuelot River in a roughly north-south orientation. The bridge is a reproduction of the 1862 bridge. The 1862 bridge was a single span Town lattice truss, with a span of 122 feet (37 m) and a roadway width of 17 feet (5.2 m). Its name derives from a family that lived nearby at the time of its construction. It rested on abutments of split granite, and was covered with a tin roof. Its sides were fully sheathed, and it had numerous repairs and parts replaced.

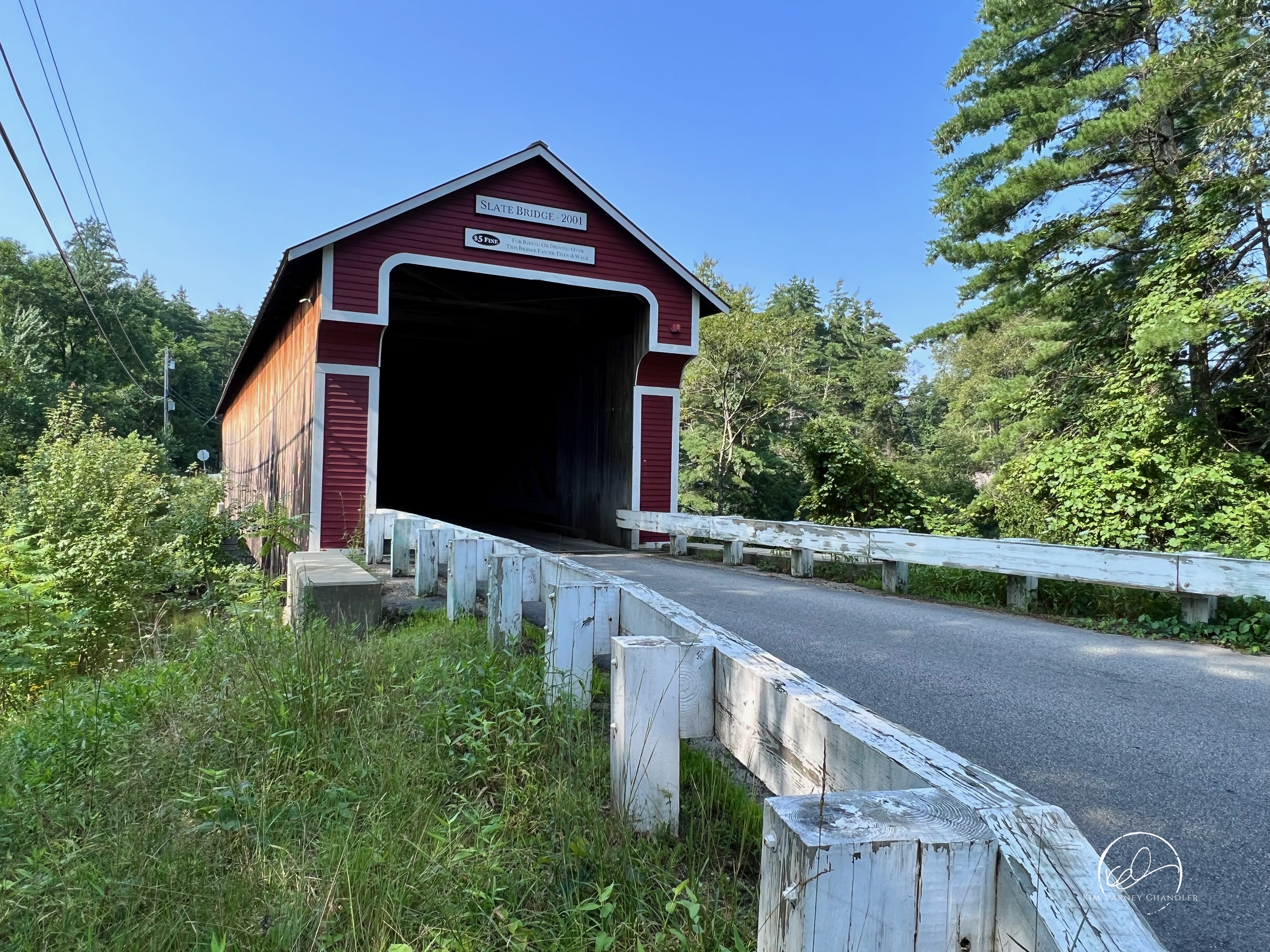
Slate Bridge, 2023

Following a devastating fire in 1993, the Slate Bridge was rebuilt in 2001. Through fundraising efforts from the Slate Covered Bridge Committee, a new $950,000 covered bridge was designed by Hoyle Tanner and built by Wright Construction, Inc. The project received several merit awards, including the 2002 National Timber Bridge Award, the 2003 National Council of Structural Engineers Associations Award, and the Plan New Hampshire Award in 2004.

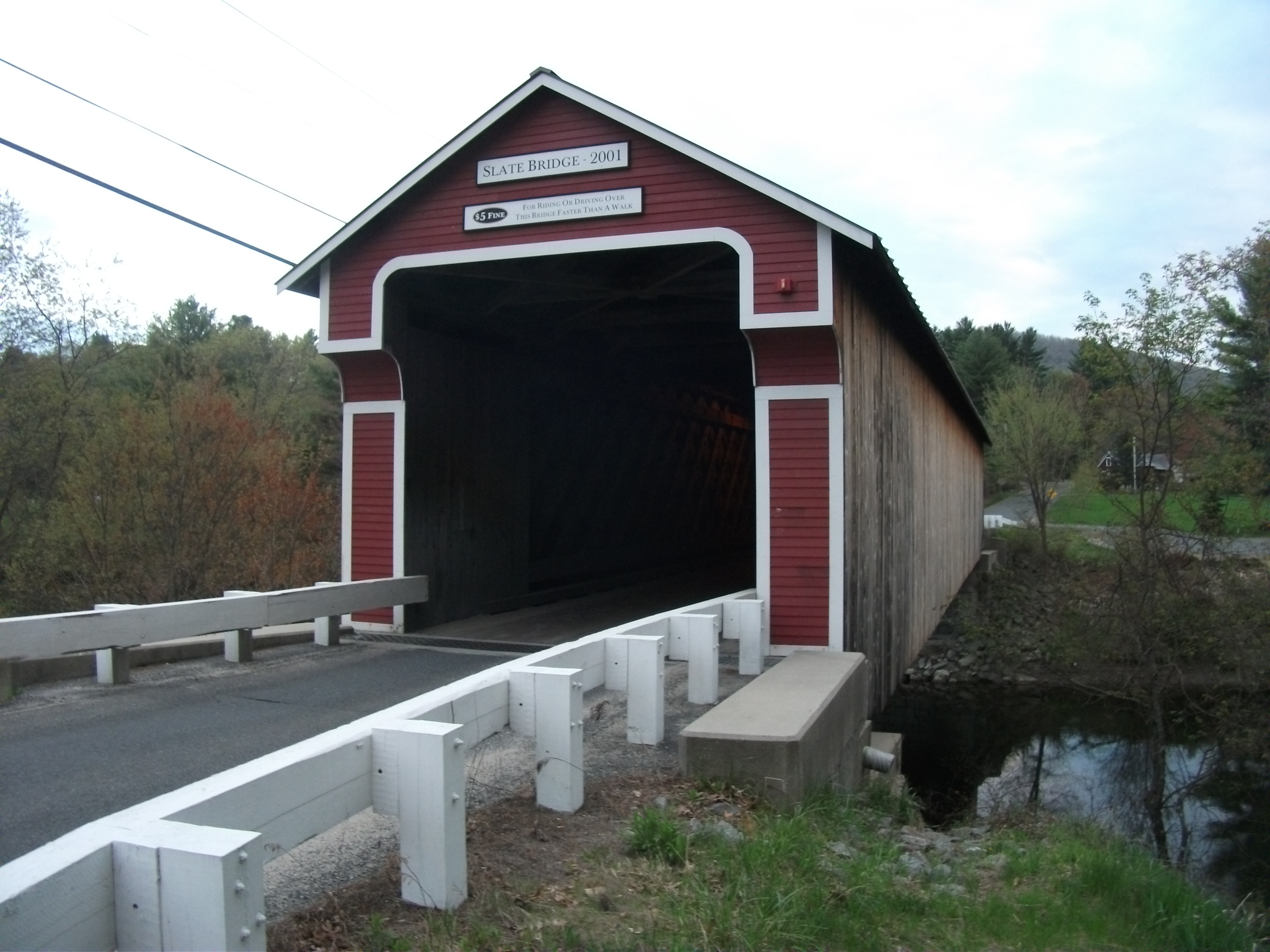
The 2001 bridge, as seen in 2011

== See also ==
- National Register of Historic Places listings in Cheshire County, New Hampshire
- List of bridges on the National Register of Historic Places in New Hampshire
- List of New Hampshire covered bridges
