= Sawyers Crossing Covered Bridge =

- U.S. National Register of Historic Places
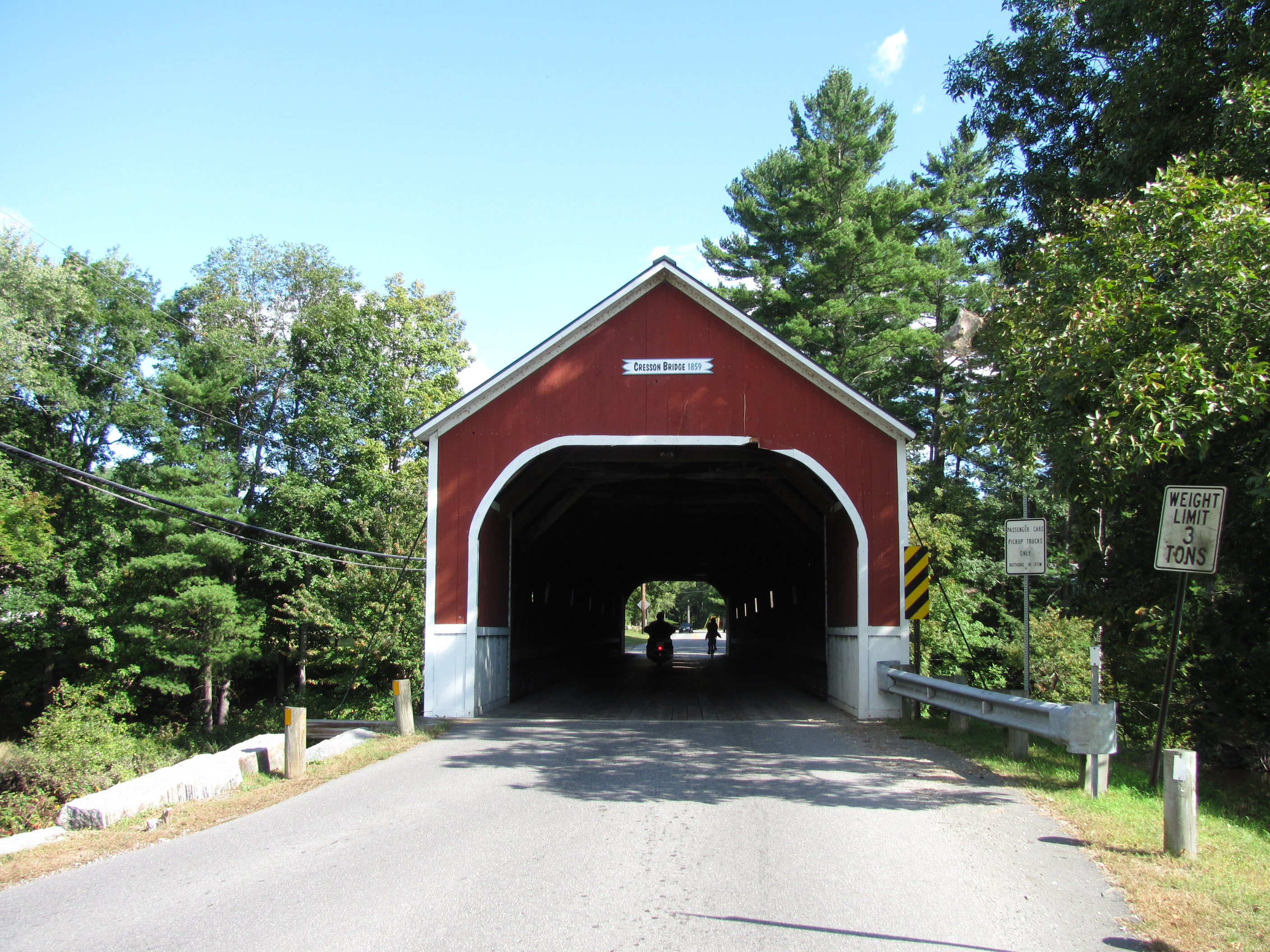
- Sawyers Crossing/Cresson Bridge

- Location within New Hampshire Location within the United States
- Location: Sawyers Crossing Road over the Ashuelot River, Swanzey, New Hampshire
- Coordinates: 42°53′10″N 72°17′12″W
- Area: less than one acre
- Built: 1859
- Architectural style: Town truss
- NRHP reference No.: 78000211
- Added to NRHP: November 14, 1978

The Sawyers Crossing Covered Bridge, also known as the Cresson Bridge, is a wooden covered bridge carrying Sawyers Crossing Road over the Ashuelot River in west Swanzey, New Hampshire. Built in 1859 to replace an older bridge, it continues to serve as a part of Swanzey's transportation network, and is one of the state's few surviving 19th-century covered bridges. It was listed on the National Register of Historic Places in 1978.

== Description and history ==
The Sawyers Crossing Covered Bridge is located west of Swanzey's village center, spanning the Ashuelot River in a roughly east–west orientation. It is a two-span Town truss construction, resting on abutments and a central pier made of split granite. Its exterior is finished in vertical board siding, and it is covered by a metal gabled roof. The portals are rectangular with rounded corners at the top. It is 117 feet (36 m) long and 17 feet (5.2 m) wide.

The bridge was built in 1859 to replace a bridge built in 1771. It has had metal parts (tie rods and bolts) added to increase its strength, and it continues to receive regular maintenance. In 1983, repairs were made by Evroke Corporation of Laconia and a significant renovation was made by Wright Construction Co., Inc. of Mount Holly, Vermont, in 1996.

The bridge gained some notice in 1953, when a picture of it was used in a cigarette advertising campaign, in which it was known as the "kissing bridge".

== See also ==
- List of New Hampshire covered bridges
- List of bridges on the National Register of Historic Places in New Hampshire
- National Register of Historic Places listings in Cheshire County, New Hampshire
