= Mirey Brook =

Stream in the United States

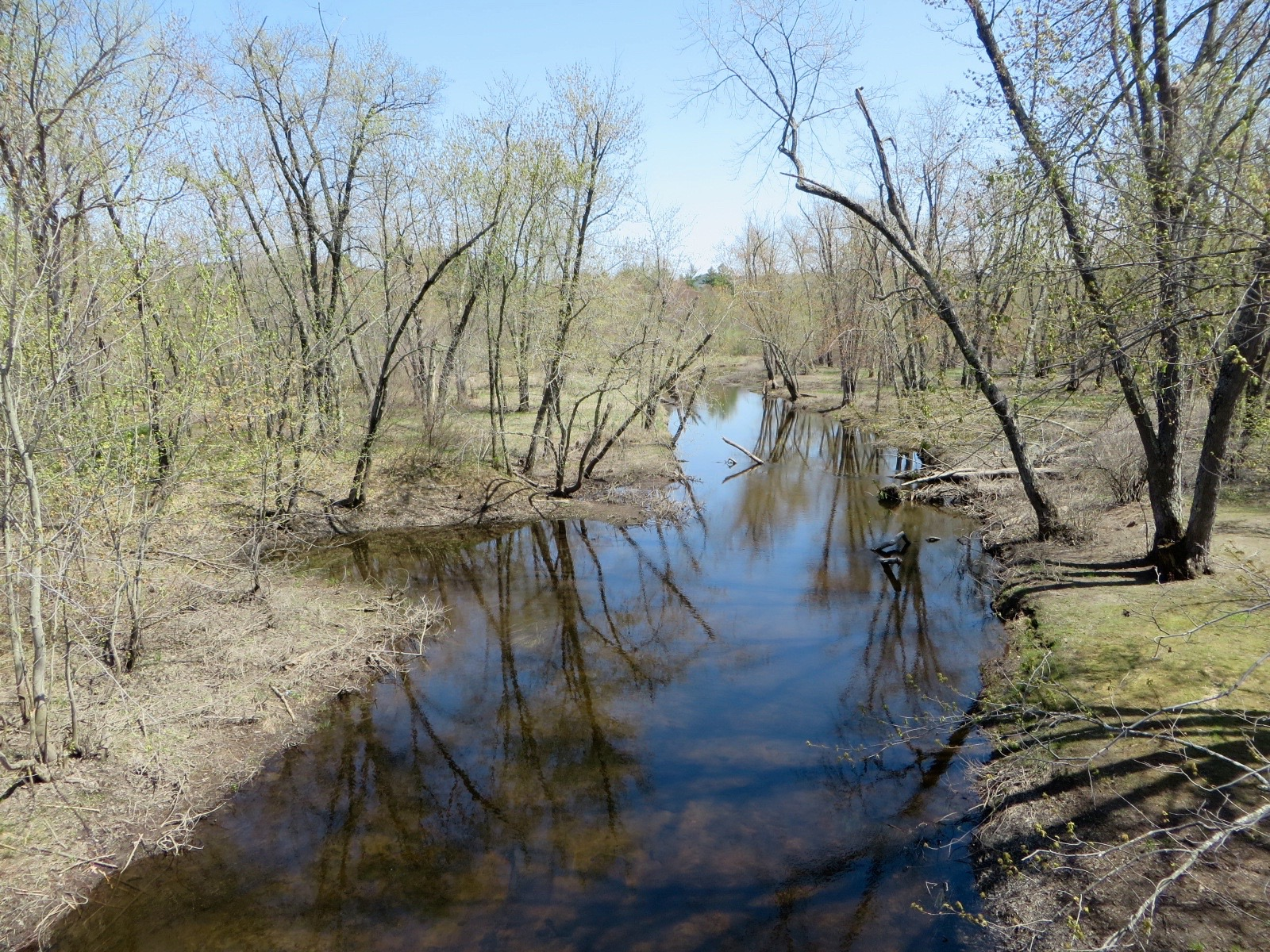
- Mirey Brook at NH 10 bridge in Winchester, NH, just upstream from its mouth at the Ashuelot River

- Location within New Hampshire Location within Massachusetts Location within the United States

Location
- Country: United States
- States: Massachusetts, New Hampshire
- Counties: Franklin, MA, Cheshire, NH
- Towns: Warwick, MA, Winchester, NH

Physical characteristics
- Source: Mount Grace
  - location: Warwick, MA
  - coordinates: 42°42′5″N 72°21′42″W
  - elevation: 995 ft (303 m)
- Mouth: Ashuelot River
  - location: Winchester, NH
  - coordinates: 42°46′7″N 72°23′17″W
  - elevation: 430 ft (130 m)
- Length: 6.5 mi (10.5 km)

Basin features
- Tributaries
  - left: Black Brook
  - right: Mountain Brook, Roaring Brook

Mirey Brook is a 6.5-mile-long (10.5 km) stream in northern Massachusetts and southwestern New Hampshire in the United States. It is a tributary of the Ashuelot River, itself a tributary of the Connecticut River, which flows to Long Island Sound.

Mirey Brook begins in the town of Warwick, Massachusetts, at the outlet of a wetland at the northern base of Mount Grace. It flows north to the head of Sunny Valley, where it receives Mountain Brook and Kidder Brook from the southeast. Continuing north, the brook enters the town limits of Winchester, New Hampshire, just as the valley changes from steep and narrow to flat and wide. The brook reaches the Ashuelot River at the village of Winchester.

State Route 78 follows Mirey Brook from its confluence with Mountain Brook to its mouth at the Ashuelot.

A major tributary of Mirey Brook is Roaring Brook, which enters from the east near the village of Scotland, New Hampshire.

== See also ==
- List of rivers of Massachusetts
- List of rivers of New Hampshire
