= William E. Roberts =

American politician (1926–2025)

Member of the New Hampshire House of Representatives from the Cheshire 4th district
- In office 1998–2002

Personal details
- Born: William Edward Roberts; February 1, 1926 North Adams, Massachusetts, U.S.
- Died: July 9, 2025 (aged 99) Hinsdale, New Hampshire, U.S.
- Party: Republican
- Spouse: Marguerite Deming (m. 1947; died. 2021)

William Edward Roberts (February 1, 1926 – July 9, 2025) was an American politician. A member of the Republican Party, he served in the New Hampshire House of Representatives from 1998 to 2002.

== Early life and career ==
Roberts was born in North Adams, Massachusetts, the son of Raymond Sawyer Roberts and Carrie Begiebing. He attended and graduated from Whitingham High School. After graduating, he served in the United States Army Air Corps during World War II, which after his discharge, he worked as a selectman in Hinsdale, New Hampshire.

Roberts served in the New Hampshire House of Representatives from 1998 to 2002.

== Personal life and death ==
In 1947, Roberts married Marguerite Deming. Their marriage lasted until her death in 2021.

Roberts died at his home in Hinsdale, New Hampshire, on July 9, 2025, at the age of 99.
