= Ashuelot, New Hampshire =

Unincorporated community in New Hampshire, United States

- Unincorporated community
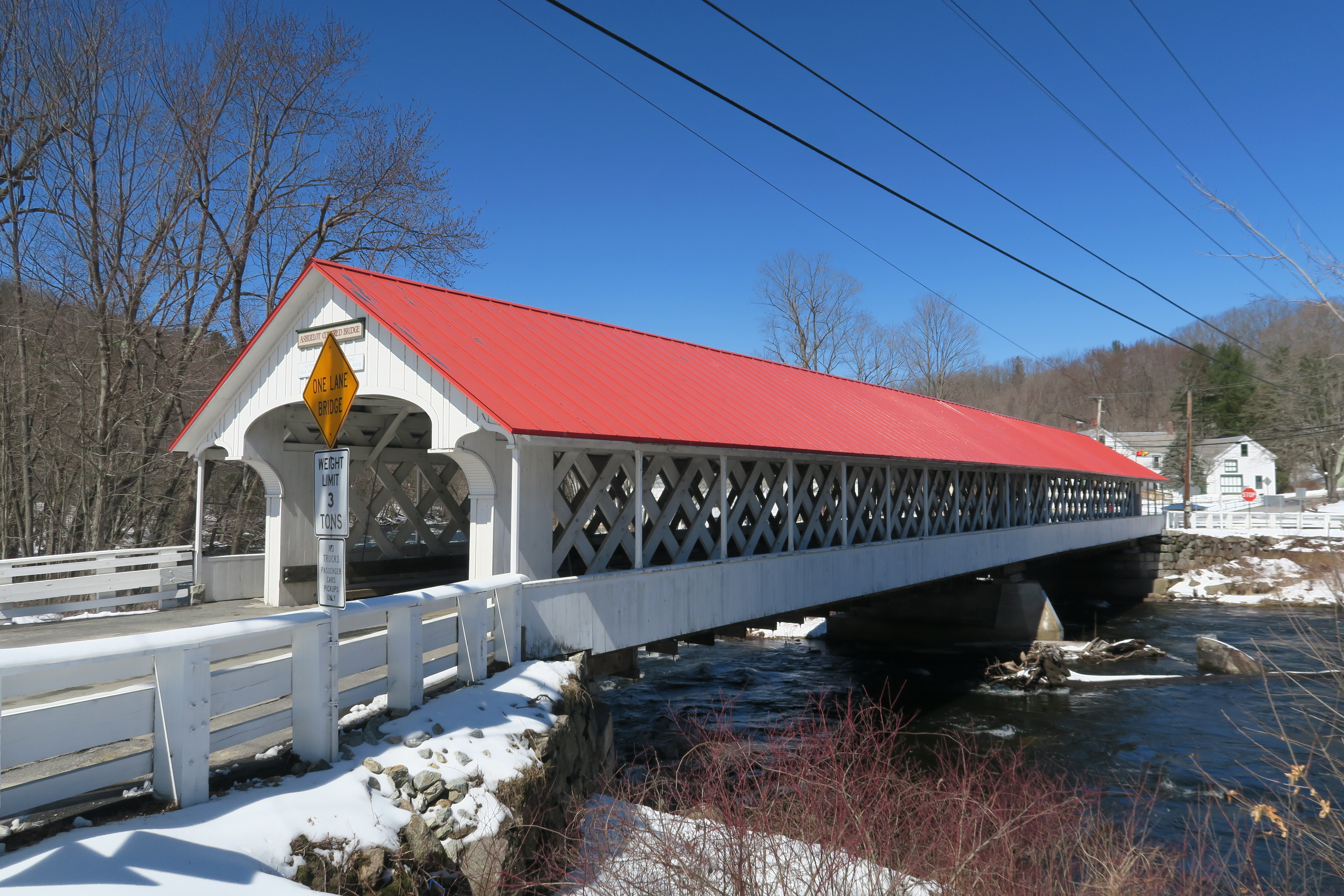
- Ashuelot Covered Bridge

- Location within New Hampshire Location within the United States
- Coordinates: 42°46′38″N 72°25′24″W
- Country: United States
- State: New Hampshire
- County: Cheshire
- Town: Winchester
- Elevation: 430 ft (130 m)
- Time zone: UTC-5 (Eastern (EST))
  - Summer (DST): UTC-4 (EDT)
- ZIP code: 03441
- Area code: 603
- GNIS feature ID: 865270

Ashuelot is an unincorporated community in the town of Winchester near the southwestern corner of New Hampshire, United States. The village is named after the Ashuelot River.

New Hampshire Route 119 passes through the village, connecting Hinsdale to the west and the village of Winchester to the east. A covered bridge crosses the Ashuelot River at the village. Ashuelot has a separate ZIP code (03441) from the rest of the town of Winchester.
