= Ashuelot Covered Bridge =

- U.S. National Register of Historic Places
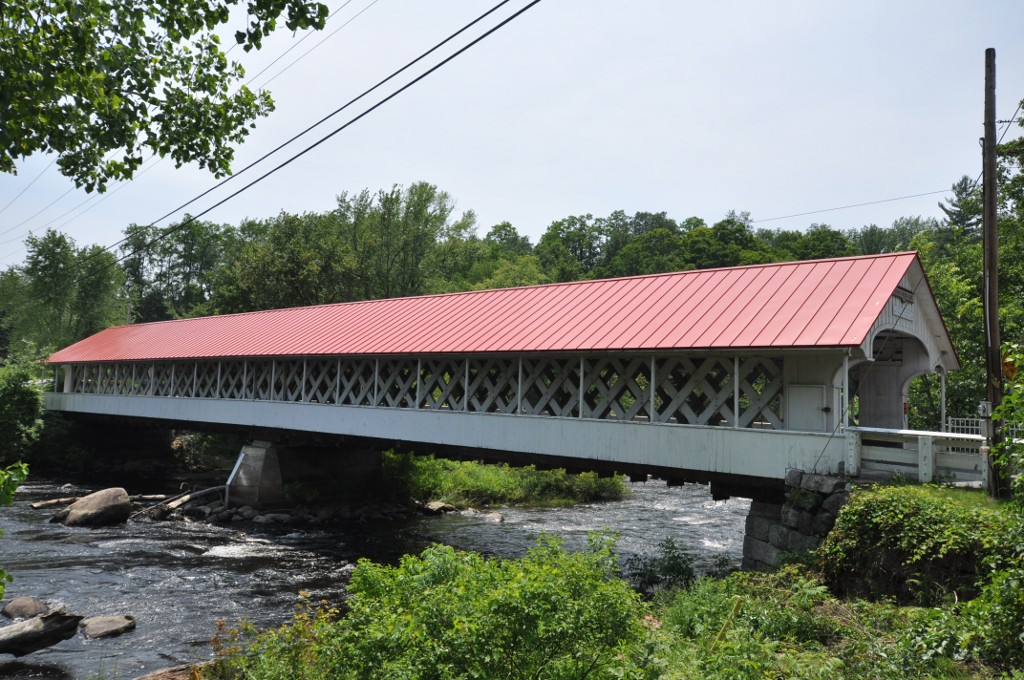

- Location within New Hampshire Location within the United States
- Location: NH 119 and Bolton Rd., Ashuelot, New Hampshire
- Coordinates: 42°46′35″N 72°25′26″W
- Area: 0.3 acres (0.12 ha)
- Built: 1864
- Architectural style: Town lattice truss
- NRHP reference No.: 81000069
- Added to NRHP: February 20, 1981

The Ashuelot Covered Bridge is a historic wooden covered bridge over the Ashuelot River on Bolton Road, just south of its intersection with NH 119 in Ashuelot, an unincorporated village of Winchester, New Hampshire. Built in 1864-65, it is one of the state's few surviving 19th-century covered bridges. It was listed on the National Register of Historic Places in 1981.

The Ashuelot Covered Bridge (1965) spans the Ashuelot River near Winchester, New Hampshire, U.S.A. (black & white 2025)

== Description and history ==
The Ashuelot Covered Bridge is located in western Winchester, at the center of Ashuelot Village. It is a Town lattice truss bridge, spanning the Ashuelot River in a roughly north-south orientation. It consists of two spans with a total length of 178 feet (54 m). The total width of the bridge is 29 feet (8.8 m), and has a central roadway and sidewalks (measuring 3'10" in width) on each side. The bridge rests on stone abutments and a central pier. The abutments have been reinforced with concrete since the bridge was built, and the central pier has been protected by a metal breakwater. The bridge passes 11'7" over the water. One unusual feature of this bridge is that its sides are not fully sheathed, the usual means by which the truss elements are protected from the elements. Instead, the bridge roof is extended to provide long eaves, and the sides are sheathed to the height of the walkway handrails.

A bridge was already standing at this site when the town of Winchester first began considering construction of a replacement in 1853. A new bridge was finally approved in 1864, and the present structure was opened the next year, having cost $4,650 to build. Portions of the old bridge were apparently used in its construction, since older beams were found in it during repairs made after the New England Hurricane of 1938. The bridge was the principal means of access between the village railroad station (located near its southern abutment) and the village proper on the north bank.

The 1998 repairs of the Ashuelot Bridge in Winchester included significant repairs to the abutments. As crews worked to correct the grade of the approaches, two large granite capstones were uncovered and buried in the fill. These granite blocks, one of which was found whole and the other cracked in two, were reinstalled in their original location in front of new back walls made of stone and mortar. These granite capstones are visible at each approach to the bridge. The Ashuelot Bridge in Winchester was reopened on July 2, 1999, after a $667,000 rehabilitation project. The completed rehabilitation received the first-ever Palladio Award for Covered Bridges in 2003.

== See also ==
- List of New Hampshire covered bridges
- List of bridges on the National Register of Historic Places in New Hampshire
- National Register of Historic Places listings in Cheshire County, New Hampshire
