= Robert Merrill Lee =

United States Air Force general (1909–2003)

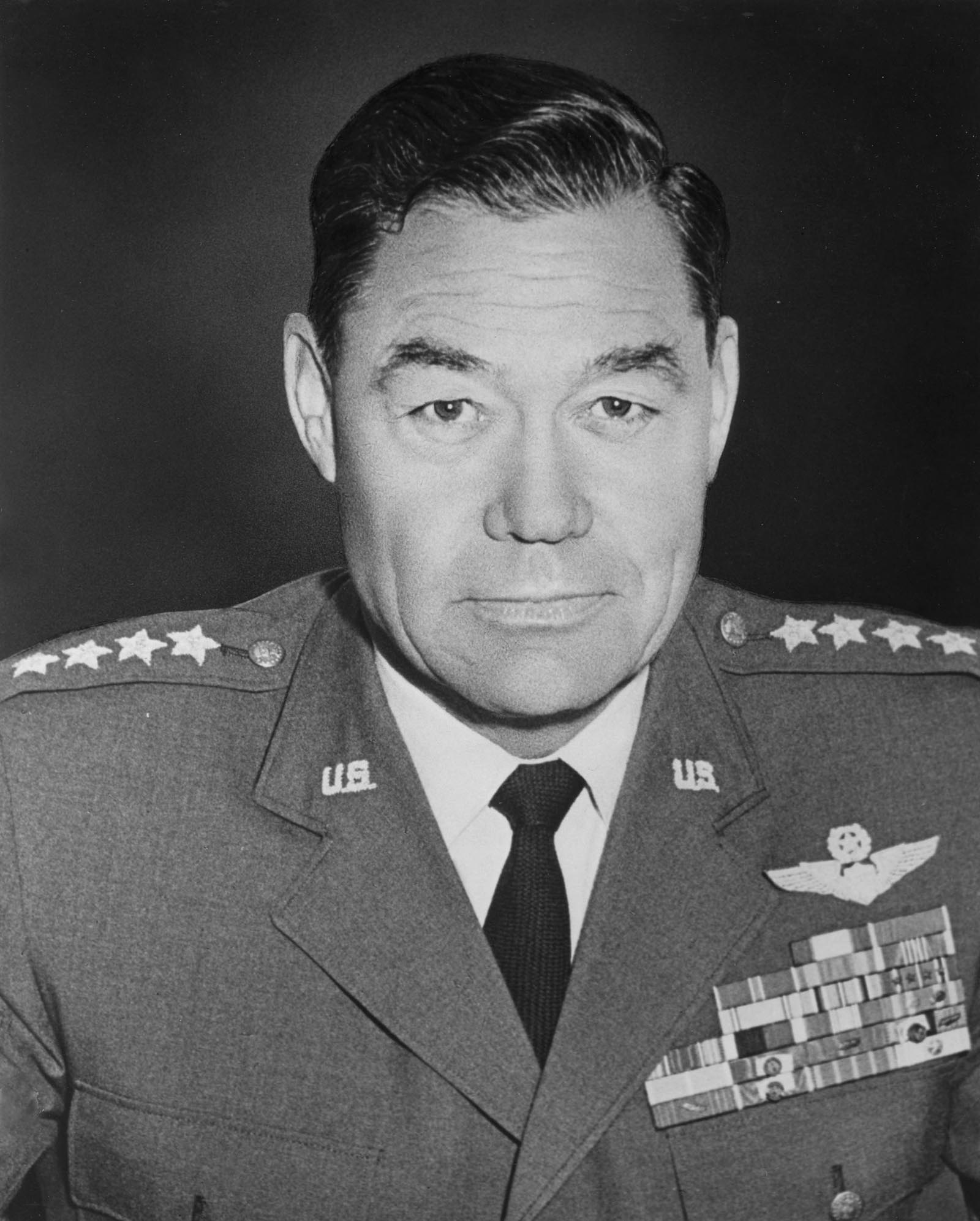
- Robert Merrill Lee
- Born: April 13, 1909; Hinsdale, New Hampshire
- Died: June 29, 2003 (aged 94); Rockledge, Florida
- Military career
- Branch: United States Air Force; United States Army
- Service years: 1931–1966
- Rank: General
- Commands: Tactical Air Command; 12th Air Force; 9th Air Force; Air Defense Command
- Conflicts: World War II
- Awards: Distinguished Service Medal; Legion of Merit; Bronze Star; Air Medal; Army Commendation Medal; Croix de Guerre with Palm

General Robert Merrill Lee CBE (April 13, 1909 – June 29, 2003) was the air deputy to the Supreme Allied Commander Europe, with the responsibility of assisting SACEUR in developing, training and employing NATO combat forces for the defense of allied Europe.

== Biography ==
=== Early career ===
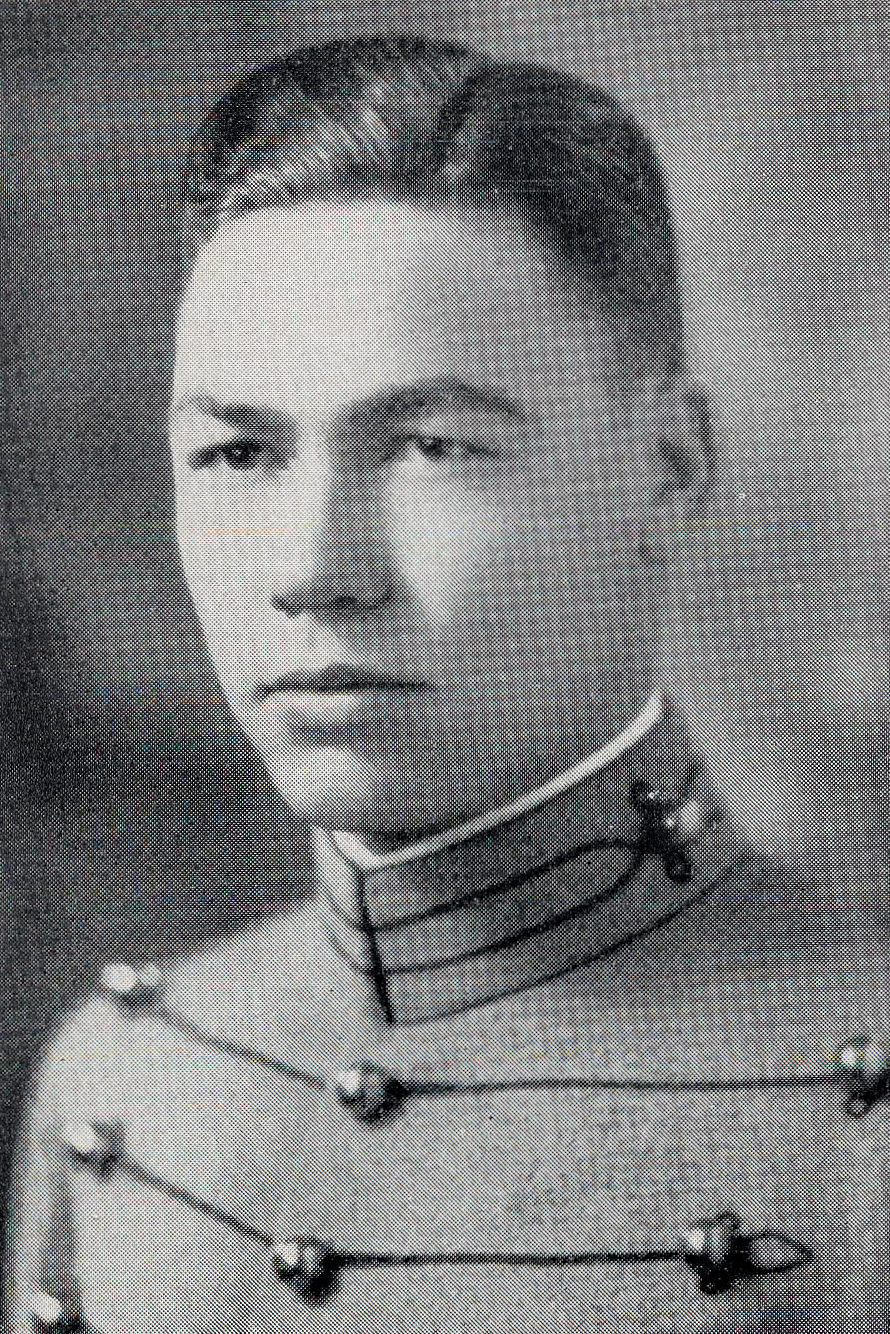
Lee as a United States Military Academy cadet c. 1931

Lee was born in Hinsdale, New Hampshire, educated in the public schools in Augusta, Maine, and graduated from the United States Military Academy at West Point, N.Y., in June 1931. After attending Air Corps Flying Schools at Randolph and Kelly fields, Texas, General Lee received his wings in October 1932.

He was assigned to the 55th Pursuit Squadron of the 20th Pursuit Group at Barksdale Field, Louisiana. While at Barksdale he performed pilot and other squadron officer duties. In early 1934 when U.S. airmail contracts were cancelled by the president, Lieutenant Lee joined other officers in his group flying the airmail in the central zone.

In May 1937 he was assigned to the First Cavalry (Mechanized) at Fort Knox, Kentucky. In addition to participating in intensive training as a junior officer in Troop "C," First Mechanized Cavalry Regiment, Lieutenant Lee commanded several detachments, guarding the shipments of gold that were being shipped from various mints in the United States, to the Fort Knox Gold Repository. The following year he returned to the U.S. Army Air Corps and was assigned to the 12th Observation Squadron, Godman Field, also at Fort Knox. During 1938 to 1940 he was aide-de-camp to General Adna R. Chaffee, Jr., the "father" of the Armored Force. During this period of his career he assisted in the development of operations teamwork between air and ground forces. In 1940 Captain Lee attended the Air Corps Tactical School at Maxwell Field, Alabama. During 1940-1941 he commanded the 12th Observation Squadron.

=== World War II ===
In late 1941 Major Lee became chief of corps aviation, Headquarters I Armored Corps, and later air officer for Armored Force headquarters. In 1942 Lieutenant Colonel Lee organized at Godman Field, and commanded the newly activated 73rd Observation Group, later to become the 10th Recce Group and Wing, now assigned to Allied Command Europe, NATO and stationed in England. In January 1943 he was promoted to colonel and became chief of staff of the First Air Support Command at Morris Field, North Carolina. He continued in this position through successive reorganizations and redesignations of this command as I Tactical Air Division and the Third Tactical Air Command.

In August 1944, Colonel Lee joined the Ninth Air Forces in France where he served as deputy commander for operations under Lieutenant General Hoyt S. Vandenberg and shared responsibility for the defeat of Germany in four major campaigns: Northern France, the Rhineland, the Ardennes, and Central Europe. He was promoted to brigadier general in January 1945. At the end of hostilities when the Ninth Air Force took up its occupation role, he served as chief of staff. Late in 1945 General Lee was assigned to the air section of the Theater General Board at Bad Nauheim as it completed its analyses and reports on the European campaigns.

=== Post war ===
In January 1946, General Lee returned to the United States and in April he became the first chief of staff of the newly organized Tactical Air Command at Langley Field, Virginia, where he remained until August 1946 when he entered the first class of the National War College. After graduation from the National War College, General Lee was assigned in July 1947 to Tactical Air Command as deputy commanding general. During this assignment, in February 1948, he was promoted to major general. From November 1948, he served as commanding general until July 1950.

From Langley Air Force Base, General Lee went to Eglin Air Force Base, Florida, and assumed command of Air Task Group 3.4, a special assignment to Operation Greenhouse that culminated in the atomic test at Eniwetok during the spring of 1951. When this assignment was completed in July 1951, General Lee was named the deputy director of plans under the deputy chief of staff for operations, Headquarters U.S. Air Force, Washington, D.C., with a simultaneous duty as the Air Force member of the Joint Strategic Plans Committee. Shortly thereafter he became the director of plans.

In November 1953, General Lee was assigned to command the Fourth Allied Tactical Air Force and the Twelfth U.S. Air Force in Europe. The former constituted the largest tactical air forces in Allied Command Europe, consisting of all United States, French and Canadian air forces on the continent of Europe committed to the Supreme Allied Commander. In June 1956, command of the two air forces was separated. General Lee retained command of the Allied Tactical Air Force. When he returned to the United States in July 1957, he became commander of the Ninth Air Force, Tactical Air Command, with headquarters at Shaw Air Force Base, South Carolina.

One year later, on July 15, 1958, General Lee assumed the rank of lieutenant general and arrived at United Nations Command headquarters, Seoul, Korea, to become chief of staff, United Nations Command and U.S. Forces, Korea. In September 1959 he returned to the United States to become vice commander of the Air Defense Command in Colorado Springs, Colorado, becoming commander in March 1961. He was promoted to general on June 4, 1963, and became air deputy to the supreme allied commander, Europe, on August 1, 1963.

== Honors and awards ==
A command pilot with more than 9,000 hours flying time, Lee includes among his awards and decorations the Distinguished Service Medal, Legion of Merit, Bronze Star Medal, Air Medal and Army Commendation Medal. In addition to various awards and decorations from other U.S. allies, he wears the French Legion of Honor in the grade of Commander and the Croix de Guerre with Palm; the Luxembourg Order of Merit of Adolph of Nassau, Degree of Commander with Crown; the Most Excellent Order of the British Empire, Degree of Honorary Commander; and the Korean Order of Military Merit, Taeguk, with silver star. (Taken from U.S. Air Force Biography)
