= Wapack Wilderness =

Coordinates: 42°44′N 71°56′W

Map of the Wapack Wilderness and surrounding area

Summit overlooking Binney Pond.

Hikers from the Hampshire Country School atop the summit of Pratt Mountain.

The Wapack Wilderness is a 1,400-acre (6 km^{2}) tract of forest in the towns of Rindge and New Ipswich, New Hampshire. The land is owned by the Hampshire Country School, a small, private school for students who do not thrive in traditional settings. It abuts Binney Pond Natural Area and land conserved by the New England Forestry Foundation. Watatic Mountain Wildlife Area is two miles (3 km) to the southeast, and Annett State Forest is two miles (3 km) to the northeast. The headwaters of the Millers River flow from the area, feeding into Converse Meadows and Lake Monomonac before entering Massachusetts.

== Overview ==
The wilderness contains more than a mile of the historic Wapack Trail, and features wetlands, rare natural communities, rocky ridges, and old-growth forest. The area is rich with wildlife, including moose, bobcat, fisher, mink, weasel, beaver, otter, white-tailed deer, coyote, red fox, ducks, warblers, and salamanders.
