= Pisgah State Park =

State park in Cheshire County, New Hampshire

- Location within New Hampshire
- Interactive map of Pisgah State Park
- Location: Cheshire County, New Hampshire, United States
- Coordinates: 42°50′25″N 72°27′13″W
- Area: 13,361 acres (5,407 ha)
- Elevation: 971 feet (296 m); Min.: 390 ft (120 m) (Ashuelot River); Max.: 1,381 ft (421 m) (Hubbard Hill)
- Established: 1967
- Administrator: New Hampshire Division of Parks and Recreation
- Website: Official website
- New Hampshire State Parks

Pisgah State Park is a 13,300-acre (5,400 ha) public recreation area located in the Cheshire County towns of Winchester, Chesterfield and Hinsdale in New Hampshire. It is the largest state park in New Hampshire and contains a complete watershed north of the Ashuelot River, seven ponds, four highland ridges, numerous wetlands, and a 20-acre (8 ha) parcel of old-growth forest.

== Geography ==
The park occupies portions of three towns in southwestern New Hampshire: 8,320 acres (33.7 km^{2}) are in Winchester, the northern 4,660 acres (18.9 km^{2}) are in Chesterfield, and the westernmost 690 acres (2.8 km^{2}) are in Hinsdale. Elevations in the park range from 120 m (390 ft) above sea level along the Ashuelot River at the southwestern corner of the park to 421 m (1,381 ft) at the summit of Hubbard Hill near the park's northwestern boundary. The largest water body is the 120-acre (0.49 km^{2}) Pisgah Reservoir/Round Pond, west of the center of the park. The 35-acre (0.14 km^{2}) Kilburn Pond is near the western border.

== Recreational use ==
Pisgah State Park is open year round for hiking. Mountain biking, ATV and snowmobile use is permitted on certain trails. There are six trailheads around the park that provide free access to the public.
