= Ashuelot Pond =

Pond in Sullivan County, New Hampshire

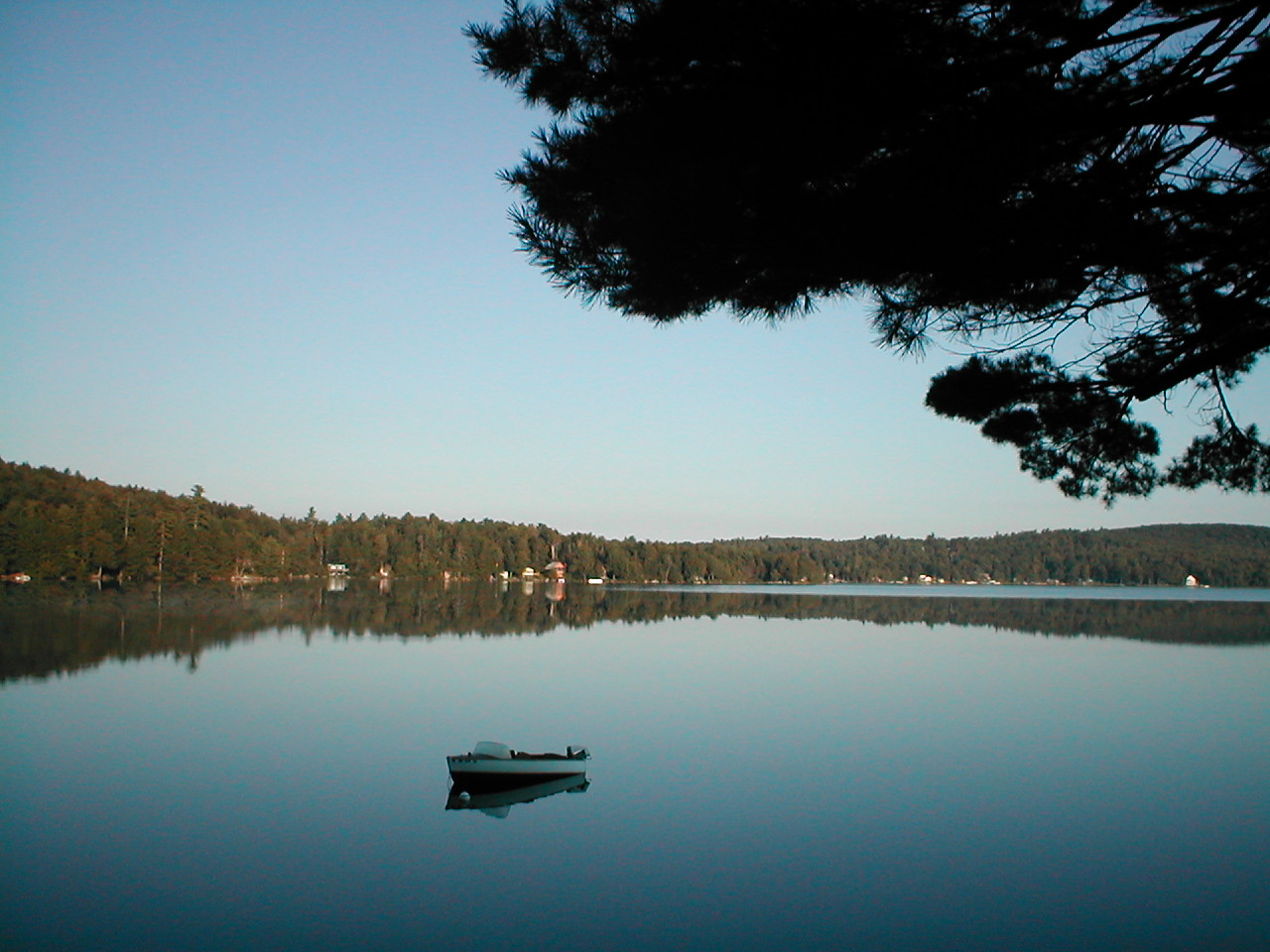

- Location within New Hampshire Location within the United States
- Location: Sullivan County, New Hampshire
- Coordinates: 43°09′05″N 72°08′57″W
- Primary inflows: Ashuelot River
- Primary outflows: Ashuelot River
- Basin countries: United States
- Max. length: 2.9 mi (4.7 km)
- Max. width: 0.7 mi (1.1 km)
- Surface area: 360 acres (150 ha)
- Average depth: 8 ft (2.4 m)
- Max. depth: 26 ft (7.9 m)
- Surface elevation: 1,443 ft (440 m)
- Settlements: Washington

Ashuelot Pond is a 368-acre (149 ha) water body located in Sullivan County in western New Hampshire, United States, in the town of Washington. It is situated along the upper reaches of the Ashuelot River, a tributary of the Connecticut River.

The pond is good for boating, fishing, and wildlife watching. Personal water craft with a capacity of two passengers or less are prohibited by the state of New Hampshire. The pond mostly has a muddy bottom.

The lake is classified as a warmwater fishery, with observed species including smallmouth bass, largemouth bass, chain pickerel, yellow perch, pumpkinseed, horned pout, and American eel.

Pond associations include the Ashuelot Pond Association and the LAE Association.

== See also ==
- List of lakes in New Hampshire
