= Hinsdale, New Hampshire =

- Town
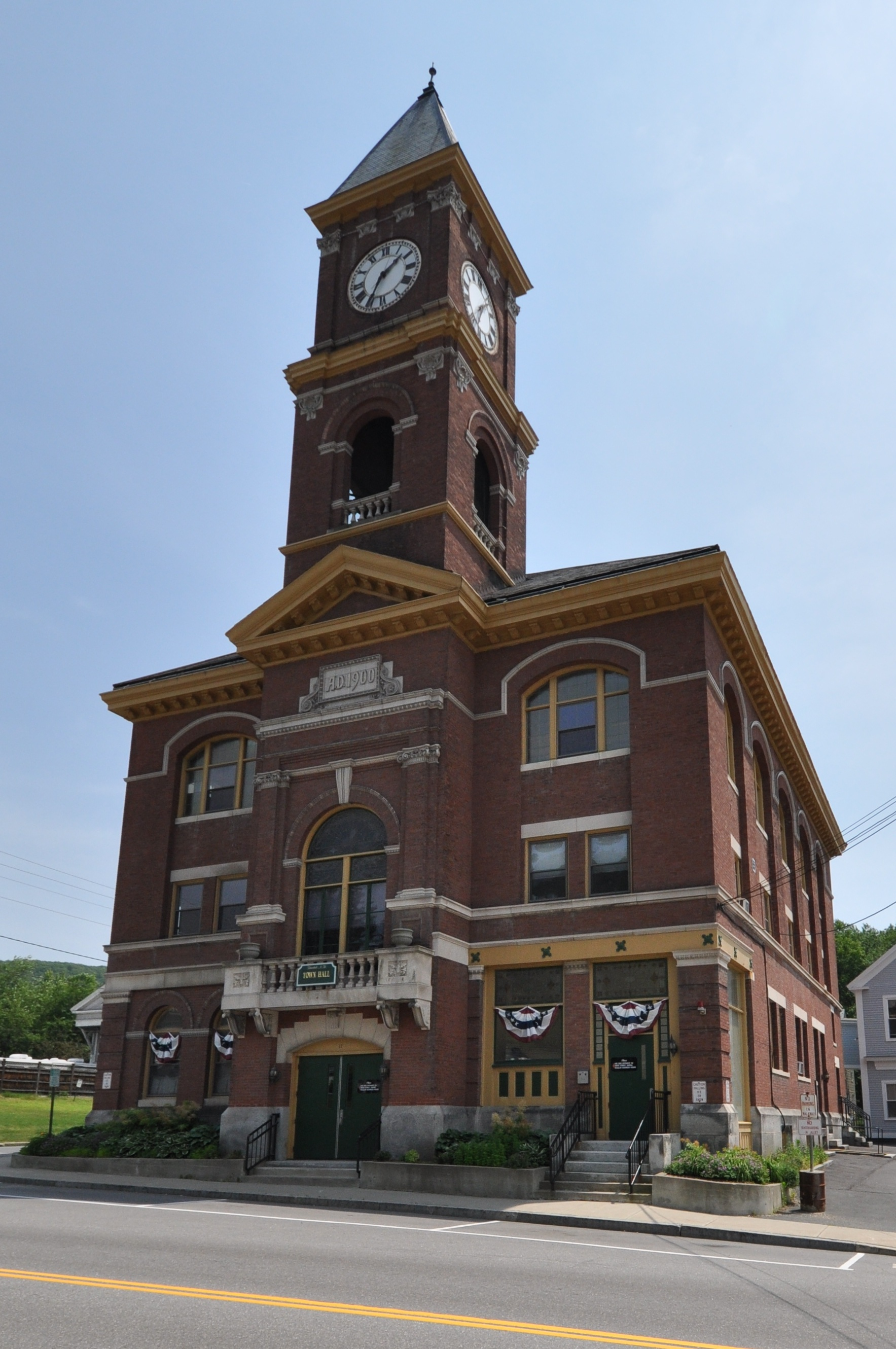
- Town Hall

- Seal

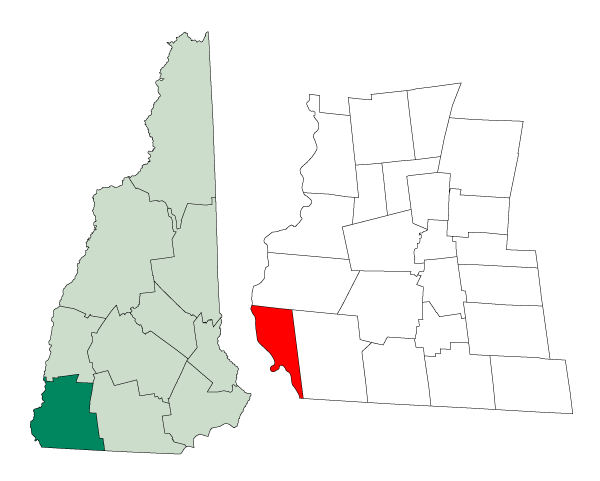
- Location in Cheshire County, New Hampshire
- Coordinates: 42°47′10″N 72°28′54″W
- Country: United States
- State: New Hampshire
- County: Cheshire
- Incorporated: 1753
- Villages: Hinsdale; North Hinsdale

Area
  - Total: 22.7 sq mi (58.7 km^{2})
  - Land: 20.5 sq mi (53.1 km^{2})
  - Water: 2.1 sq mi (5.5 km^{2}) 9.42%
- Elevation: 335 ft (102 m)

Population (2020)
  - Total: 3,948
  - Density: 192/sq mi (74.3/km^{2})
- Time zone: UTC-5 (Eastern)
  - Summer (DST): UTC-4 (Eastern)
- ZIP code: 03451
- Area code: 603
- FIPS code: 33-36660
- GNIS feature ID: 873626
- Website: www.town.hinsdale.nh.us

Hinsdale is a town in Cheshire County, New Hampshire, United States. The population was 3,948 at the 2020 census, and an estimated 4,034 in 2025. Hinsdale is home to part of Pisgah State Park in the northeast, and part of Wantastiquet Mountain State Forest in the northwest.

The main village in town, where 1,485 people resided at the 2020 census, is defined as the Hinsdale census-designated place (CDP) and is located at the junction of New Hampshire routes 119 and 63.

== History ==
Located in the southwestern corner of the state, Hinsdale was chartered in 1753. It was named for Colonel Ebenezer Hinsdale, member of a prominent Deerfield, Massachusetts, family, whose mother had been taken captive in the famed Raid on Deerfield of 1704. Graduated from Harvard, Hinsdale was ordained to become a missionary for Indians of the Connecticut River Valley. Instead, he would serve as chaplain at Fort Dummer, an important trading post on the Connecticut River, later enlisting as an officer in the army. Then, in 1742, he established Fort Hinsdale, including a trading post and gristmill, reportedly at his own expense. The town's earliest history recounts Indian assaults, raids and captivities.

Located beside the Connecticut River and connected to Brattleboro, Vermont, by bridge, Hinsdale contains excellent farmland, but has been a significant center of industry as well, especially in the manufacture of paper. Tobacco was grown in Hinsdale through the 19th century. In a machine shop here, George A. Long built a self-propelled steam vehicle in 1875, the Long steam tricycle, for which he received one of the nation's earliest automobile patents. The Hinsdale post office, located on Main Street, is the oldest continually-operating in the same building post office in the United States.

From 1959 to 2008, the town was home to the Hinsdale Greyhound Park. In 2023, Geoffrey Holt, a caretaker of a mobile home park, left the town $3.8 million to be used for education, health, recreation, and culture.

== Geography ==
Hinsdale is in the southwestern corner of New Hampshire, bordered to the west across the Connecticut River by Vermont and to the south by Massachusetts. According to the United States Census Bureau, the town has a total area of 22.7 square miles (58.7 km^{2}), of which 20.5 square miles (53.1 km^{2}) are land and 2.1 square miles (5.5 km^{2}) are water, comprising 9.42% of the town.

The highest point in town is Wantastiquet Mountain, at 1,378 feet (420 m) above sea level, located on the town's northern boundary and overlooking the Connecticut River and Brattleboro, Vermont, to the west. The entire town lies within the Connecticut River watershed, with roughly the northwestern two-thirds of town draining into small streams that feed directly into the Connecticut, and with the southeastern third of the town draining into the Ashuelot River, a major tributary of the Connecticut.

Hinsdale is served by state routes 63 and 119.

=== Adjacent municipalities ===
- Chesterfield (north)
- Winchester (east)
- Northfield, Massachusetts (south)
- Vernon, Vermont (southwest)
- Brattleboro, Vermont (northwest)

== Demographics ==
Historical population
Census	Pop.	Note	%±
1790	522		—
1800	634		21.5%
1810	740		16.7%
1820	890		20.3%
1830	937		5.3%
1840	1,141		21.8%
1850	1,963		72.0%
1860	1,312		−33.2%
1870	1,342		2.3%
1880	1,868		39.2%
1890	2,258		20.9%
1900	1,933		−14.4%
1910	1,673		−13.5%
1920	1,773		6.0%
1930	1,757		−0.9%
1940	1,762		0.3%
1950	1,950		10.7%
1960	2,187		12.2%
1970	3,276		49.8%
1980	3,631		10.8%
1990	3,936		8.4%
2000	4,082		3.7%
2010	4,046		−0.9%
2020	3,948		−2.4%
2024 (est.)	4,027		2.0%
U.S. Decennial Census

As of the census of 2010, there were 4,046 people, 1,681 households, and 1,093 families residing in the town. There were 1,827 housing units, of which 146, or 8.0%, were vacant. The racial makeup of the town was 96.5% white, 0.5% African American, 0.2% Native American, 0.5% Asian, 0.3% Native Hawaiian or Pacific Islander, 0.3% some other race, and 1.6% from two or more races. 1.4% of the population were Hispanic or Latino of any race.

Of the 1,681 households, 29.6% had children under the age of 18 living with them, 48.5% were headed by married couples living together, 10.8% had a female householder with no husband present, and 35.0% were non-families. 26.2% of all households were made up of individuals, and 10.8% were someone living alone who was 65 years of age or older. The average household size was 2.41, and the average family size was 2.85.

In the town, 21.2% of the population were under the age of 18, 8.2% were from 18 to 24, 23.9% from 25 to 44, 32.1% from 45 to 64, and 14.4% were 65 years of age or older. The median age was 42.7 years. For every 100 females, there were 99.8 males. For every 100 females age 18 and over, there were 96.5 males.

For the period 2011–2015, the estimated median annual income for a household was $50,217, and the median income for a family was $54,966. Male full-time workers had a median income of $42,781 versus $40,377 for females. The per capita income for the town was $23,995. 10.2% of the population and 4.7% of families were below the poverty line. 7.1% of the population under the age of 18 and 15.6% of those 65 or older were living in poverty.

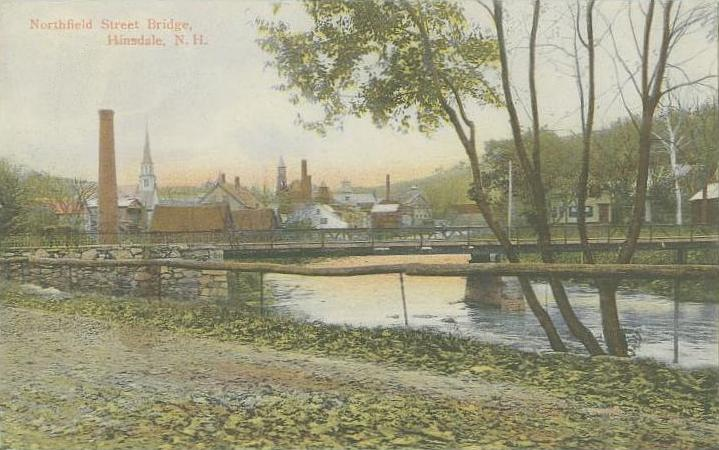
General view in 1908

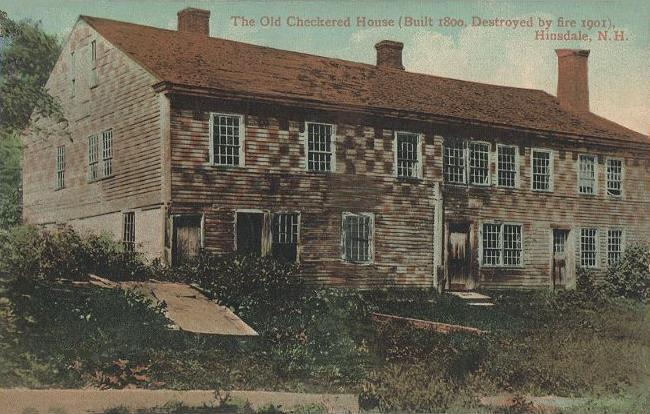
Checkered House c. 1900

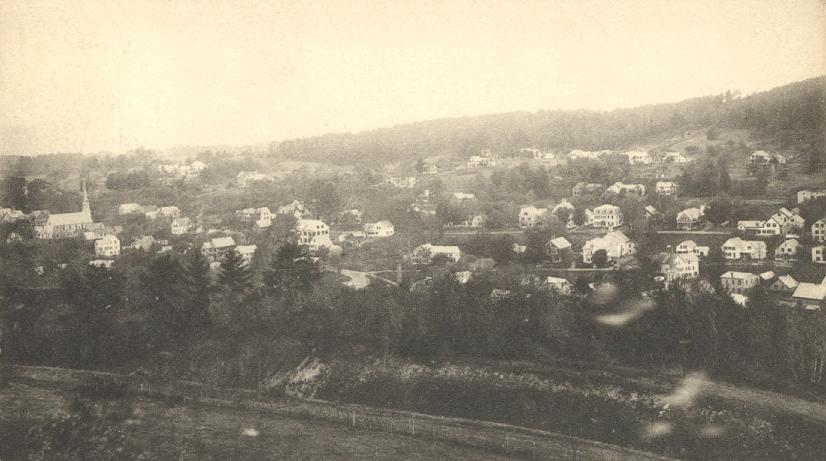
Bird's-eye view in 1906

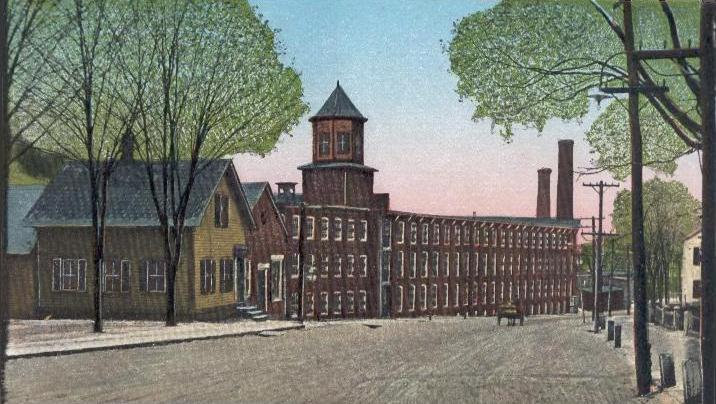
Haile & Frost Mill in 1907

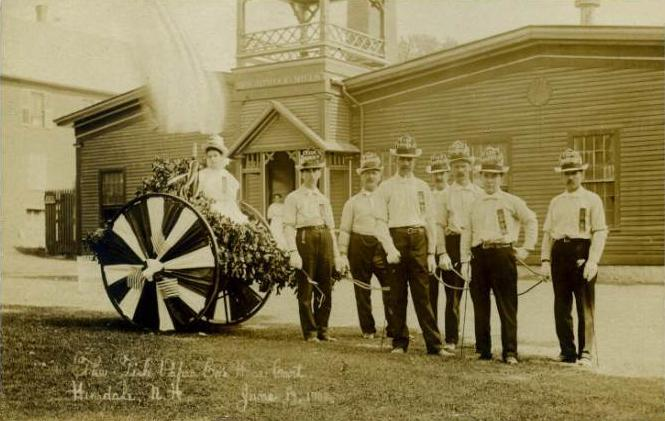
Scene at Brightwood Mills in 1908

== Notable people ==
- Elisha Andrews (1844–1917), economist, educator
- William Babcock (1785–1838), US congressman
- Charles Anderson Dana (1819–1897), journalist, government official
- Jacob Estey (1814–1890), manufacturer of reed organs
- William Haile (1807–1876), 26th governor of New Hampshire
- Geoffrey Holt (1941–2023), philanthropist
- Joey R. Hood (1974-) U.S. Ambassador to Tunisia
- Henry Hooker (1828–1907), Arizona pioneer
- Phil Labonte (born 1975), lead singer of All That Remains, Free Stater
- Robert Merrill Lee (1909–2003), general; Supreme Allied Commander Europe
- Anna Marsh (c. 1770–1834), established the Vermont Asylum of the Insane (1834)
- William E. Roberts (1926–2025), member of the New Hampshire House of Representatives
