= Winchendon (CDP), Massachusetts =

Winchendon, Massachusetts
- Census-designated place
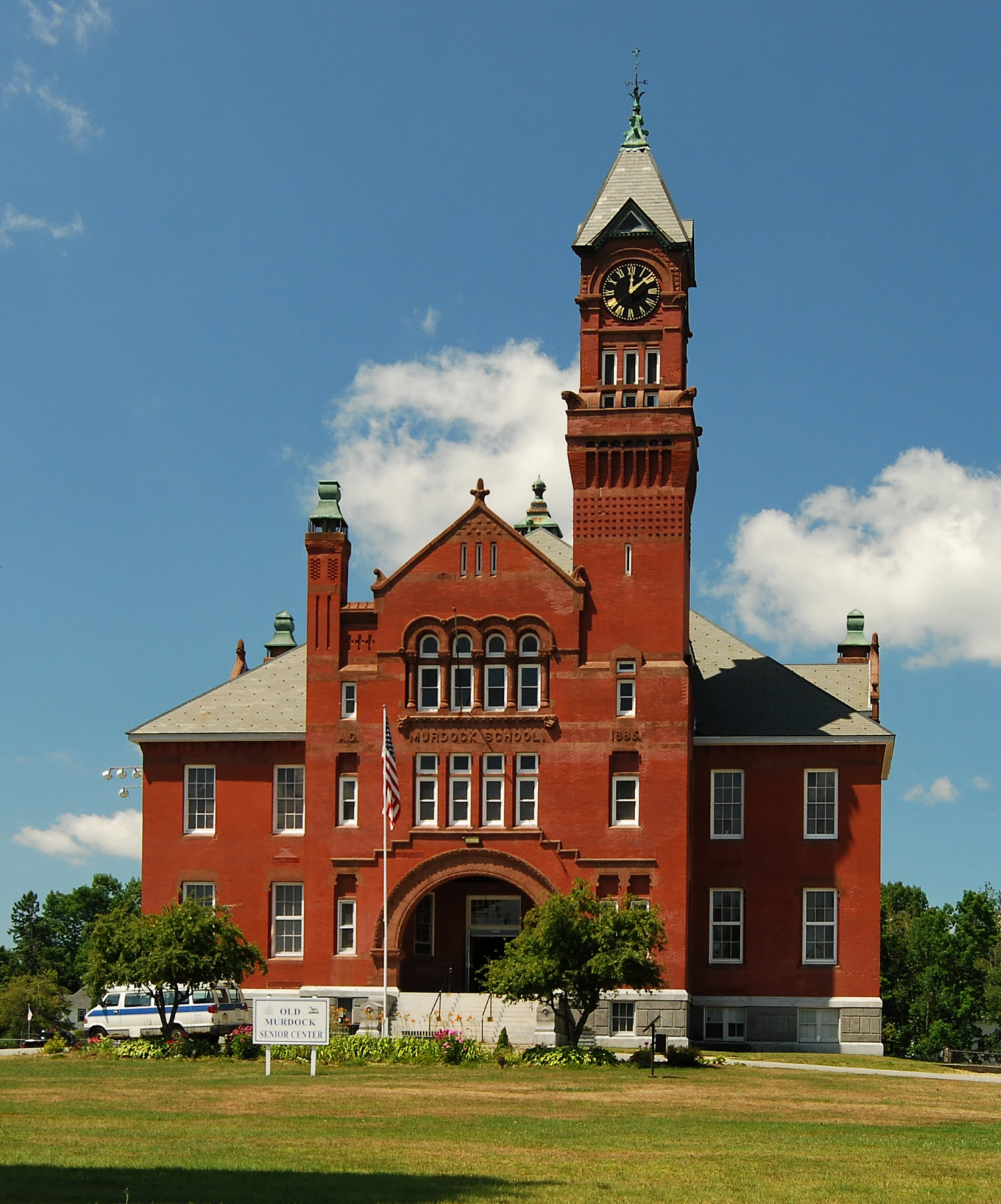
- Murdock School

- Location in Worcester County and the state of Massachusetts.
- Coordinates: 42°41′3″N 72°2′49″W
- Country: United States
- State: Massachusetts
- County: Worcester

Area
  - Total: 2.44 sq mi (6.31 km^{2})
  - Land: 2.27 sq mi (5.87 km^{2})
  - Water: 0.17 sq mi (0.45 km^{2})
- Elevation: 997 ft (304 m)

Population (2020)
  - Total: 4,160
  - Density: 1,836.5/sq mi (709.09/km^{2})
- Time zone: UTC-5 (Eastern (EST))
  - Summer (DST): UTC-4 (EDT)
- ZIP code: 01475
- Area code: 978
- FIPS code: 25-80370
- GNIS feature ID: 0610005

Winchendon is a census-designated place (CDP) in the town of Winchendon in Worcester County, Massachusetts, United States. The population was 4,160 at the 2020 census.

== Geography ==
Winchendon is located at 42°41′2″N 72°2′48″W (42.684161, -72.046811).

According to the United States Census Bureau, the CDP has a total area of 6.3 km^{2} (2.5 mi^{2}), of which 5.9 km^{2} (2.3 mi^{2}) is land and 0.4 km^{2} (0.2 mi^{2}) (6.94%) is water.

== Demographics ==
Historical population
Census	Pop.	Note	%±
2020	4,160		—
U.S. Decennial Census

As of the census of 2000, there were 4,246 people, 1,637 households, and 1,039 families residing in the CDP. The population density was 719.0/km^{2} (1,863.9/mi^{2}). There were 1,713 housing units at an average density of 290.1/km^{2} (752.0/mi^{2}). The racial makeup of the CDP was 95.24% White, 1.04% Black or African American, 0.40% Native American, 0.85% Asian, 1.25% from other races, and 1.22% from two or more races. Hispanic or Latino of any race were 2.40% of the population.

There were 1,637 households, out of which 34.2% had children under the age of 18 living with them, 45.0% were married couples living together, 14.4% had a female householder with no husband present, and 36.5% were non-families. 31.3% of all households were made up of individuals, and 15.6% had someone living alone who was 65 years of age or older. The average household size was 2.53 and the average family size was 3.19.

In the CDP, the population was spread out, with 28.9% under the age of 18, 7.9% from 18 to 24, 28.2% from 25 to 44, 20.3% from 45 to 64, and 14.6% who were 65 years of age or older. The median age was 36 years. For every 100 females, there were 89.8 males. For every 100 females age 18 and over, there were 88.2 males.

The median income for a household in the CDP was $33,375, and the median income for a family was $45,231. Males had a median income of $34,980 versus $28,302 for females. The per capita income for the CDP was $18,195. About 12.0% of families and 14.8% of the population were below the poverty line, including 16.9% of those under age 18 and 19.6% of those age 65 or over.
