= Brattleboro (CDP), Vermont =

Census-designated place in Vermont, United States

Brattleboro, Vermont
- Census-designated place
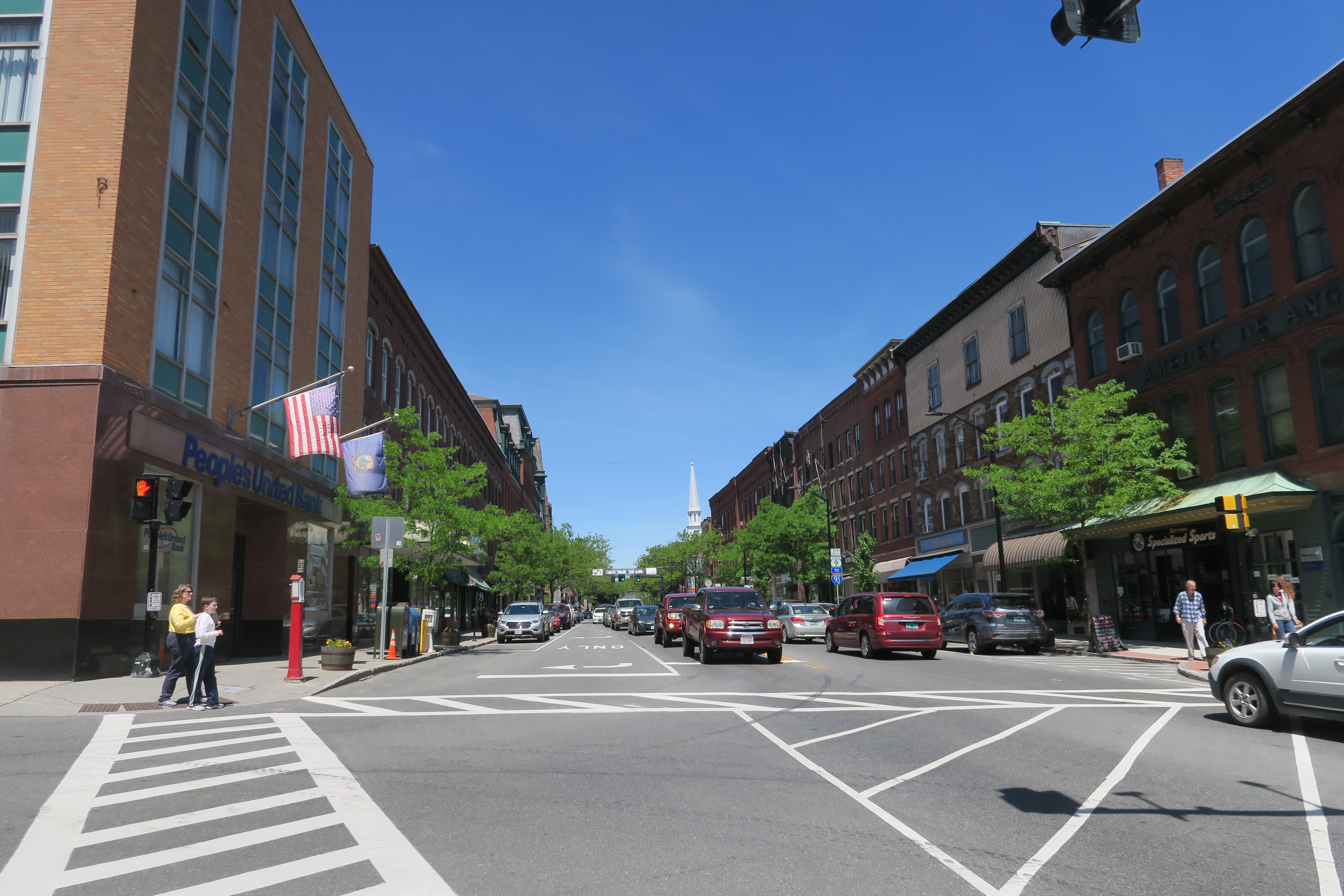
- Main Street
- Interactive map of Brattleboro, Vermont
- Coordinates: 42°52′21″N 72°33′26″W
- Country: United States
- State: Vermont
- County: Windham

Area
  - Total: 10.0 sq mi (25.8 km^{2})
  - Land: 9.5 sq mi (24.7 km^{2})
  - Water: 0.42 sq mi (1.1 km^{2})
- Elevation: 276 ft (84 m)

Population (2010)
  - Total: 7,414
  - Density: 869/sq mi (335.7/km^{2})
- Time zone: UTC-5 (Eastern (EST))
  - Summer (DST): UTC-4 (EDT)
- ZIP codes: 05301-05304
- Area code: 802
- FIPS code: 50-07975
- GNIS feature ID: 2378123

Brattleboro is a census-designated place (CDP) corresponding to the densely populated core of the town of Brattleboro in Windham County, Vermont, United States. The population was 8,289 at the 2000 census.

== Geography ==
The CDP consists of the eastern portion of the town, adjacent to the Connecticut River. According to the United States Census Bureau, the CDP has a total area of 25.8 km^{2} (10.0 sq mi). 24.7 km^{2} (9.5 sq mi) of it is land and 1.1 km^{2} (0.42 sq mi) of it (4.22%) is water.

== Demographics ==
As of the census of 2010, there were 7,414 people, 3,729 households, and 1,894 families residing in the CDP. The population density was 335.8 people/km^{2} (870 people/mi^{2}). There were 3,958 housing units at an average density of 160.4 units/km^{2} (415 units/mi^{2}). The racial makeup of the CDP was 90.8% White, 2.2% Black or African American, 0.28% Native American, 2.8% Asian, 0.02% Pacific Islander, 0.60% from other races, and 3.0% from two or more races. Hispanic or Latino of any race were 3.0% of the population.

There were 3,729 households, out of which 26.4% had children under the age of 18 living with them, 33.5% were married couples living together, 14.1% had a female householder with no husband present, and 49.2% were non-families. 40.2% of all households were made up of individuals, and 12.8% had someone living alone who was 65 years of age or older. The average household size was 2.11 and the average family size was 2.83.

In the CDP, the population was spread out, with 22.0% under the age of 18, 7.1% from 18 to 24, 30.7% from 25 to 44, 23.4% from 45 to 64, and 16.8% who were 65 years of age or older. The median age was 39 years. For every 100 females, there were 84.5 males. For every 100 females age 18 and over, there were 79.8 males.

The median income for a household in the CDP was $29,952, and the median income for a family was $40,509. Males had a median income of $30,463 versus $25,115 for females. The per capita income for the CDP was $18,573. About 11.2% of families and 15.3% of the population were below the poverty line, including 22.1% of those under age 18 and 8.4% of those age 65 or over.
