= Ashuelot River =

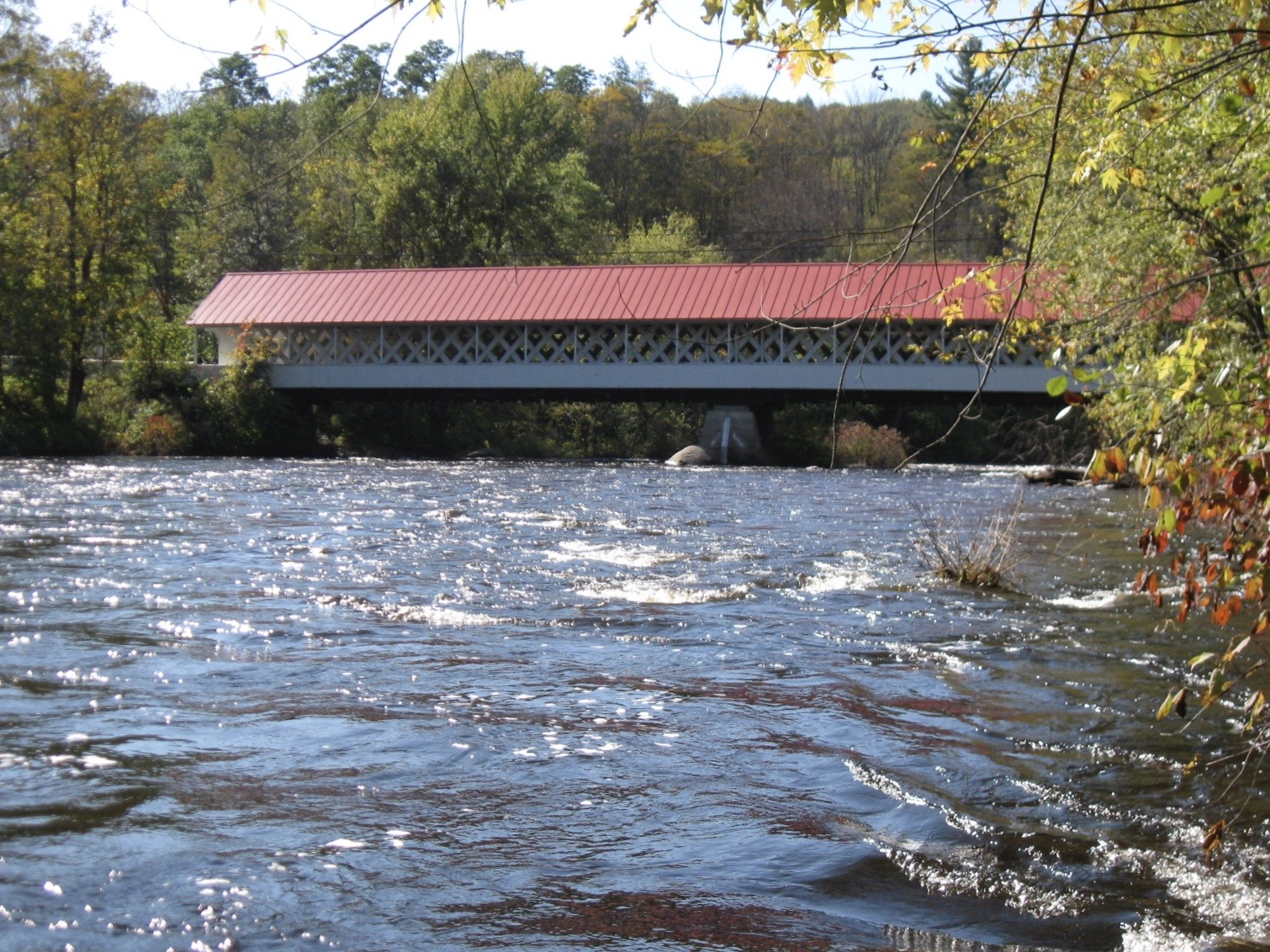
- The Ashuelot Covered Bridge in Winchester, NH

Location
- Country: United States
- State: New Hampshire
- Counties: Sullivan, Cheshire

Physical characteristics
- Source: Butterfield Pond
  - location: Washington
  - coordinates: 43.2265°N 72.1193°W
  - elevation: 1,594 feet (486 m)
- Mouth: Connecticut River
  - location: Hinsdale
  - coordinates: 42.7723°N 72.4875°W
  - elevation: 187 feet (57 m)
- Length: 64 mi (103 km)

Basin features
- Tributaries
  - left: The Branch; South Branch Ashuelot River; Mirey Brook

The Ashuelot River is a tributary of the Connecticut River, approximately 64 miles (103 km) long, in southwestern New Hampshire in the United States. It drains a mountainous area of 425 square miles (1,101 km^{2}), including much of the area known as the Monadnock Region. It is the longest tributary of the Connecticut River within New Hampshire.

== Etymology ==
Ashuelot is a Native American word meaning "collection of many waters".

== Course ==
The Ashuelot River rises out of Butterfield Pond south of Sunapee Mountain in Pillsbury State Park, near Washington in southeastern Sullivan County. It flows southwest through Ashuelot Pond into Cheshire County, then south past Keene and Swanzey and along the east side of the Pisgah Mountains. At Winchester, approximately 3 miles (5 km) from the Massachusetts state line, it turns west, flowing past the village of Ashuelot and joining the Connecticut from the east at Hinsdale, in the extreme southwest corner of New Hampshire.

The river is impounded to supply hydroelectricity at Marlow, Keene, Swanzey, and Hinsdale. The river is part of the Atlantic Salmon Restoration Program of the U.S. government.

== Covered bridges ==
The Ashuelot River has several covered bridges spanning its waters. All are listed on the National Register of Historic Places. From source to mouth:

- Carleton Bridge N.H. #7 - Swanzey (South Branch Ashuelot River)
- Sawyers Crossing Covered Bridge N.H. #6 - Swanzey
- West Swanzey Covered Bridge N.H. #5 - West Swanzey
- Slate Covered Bridge N.H. #4 - Swanzey
- Coombs Covered Bridge N.H. #2 - Winchester
- Ashuelot Covered Bridge N.H. #1 - Ashuelot

== Selected tributaries ==
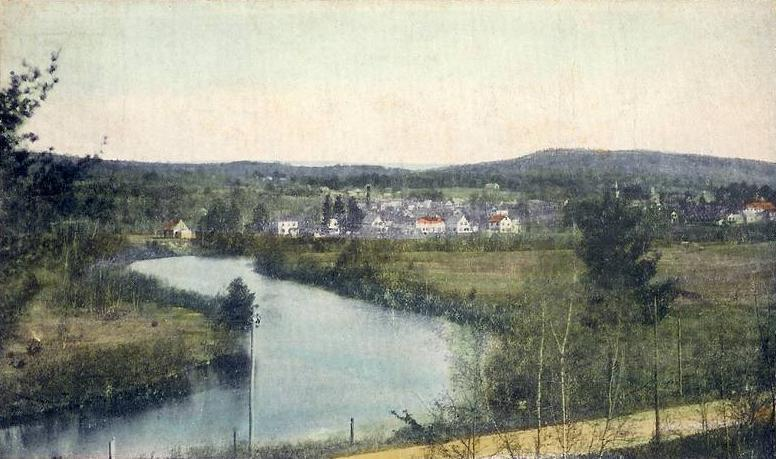
View of the Ashuelot River, West Swanzey, New Hampshire. 1915 postcard

From source to mouth:

- Cherry Brook (headwaters of the Ashuelot)
- Butler Brook
- Abbott Brook
- Grassy Brook
- Dart Brook
- Thompson Brook
- The Branch/Beaver Brook
- Ash Swamp Brook
- South Branch Ashuelot River
- California Brook
- Wheelock Brook
- Mirey Brook
- Broad Brook

== See also ==
- List of New Hampshire rivers
