= Northfield (CDP), Massachusetts =

Northfield, Massachusetts
- Census-designated place
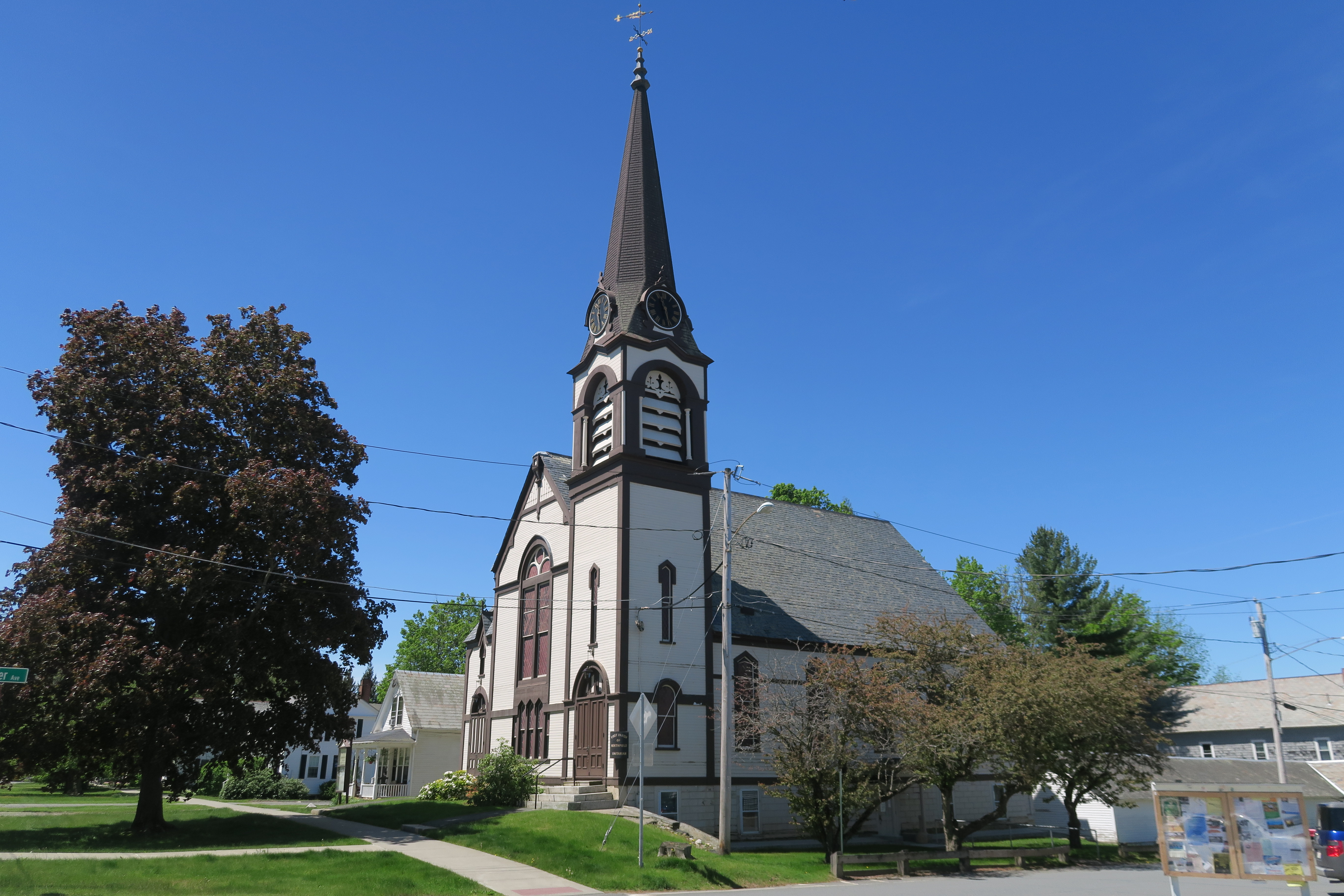
- First Parish of Northfield

- Location in Franklin County in Massachusetts
- Coordinates: 42°42′16″N 72°26′39″W
- Country: United States
- State: Massachusetts
- County: Franklin
- Town: Northfield

Area
  - Total: 4.47 sq mi (11.58 km^{2})
  - Land: 4.45 sq mi (11.53 km^{2})
  - Water: 0.019 sq mi (0.05 km^{2})
- Elevation: 292 ft (89 m)

Population (2020)
  - Total: 1,051
  - Density: 236.0/sq mi (91.12/km^{2})
- Time zone: UTC-5 (Eastern (EST))
  - Summer (DST): UTC-4 (EDT)
- ZIP Code: 01360
- Area code: 413
- FIPS code: 25-47800
- GNIS feature ID: 0609322

Northfield is a census-designated place (CDP) in the town of Northfield in Franklin County, Massachusetts, United States. The population was 1,089 at the 2010 census. It is part of the Springfield, Massachusetts Metropolitan Statistical Area. It is also home to the former Northfield campus of Northfield Mount Hermon School.

== Geography ==
According to the United States Census Bureau, the CDP has a total area of 11.6 km^{2} (4.5 mi^{2}), of which 11.6 km^{2} (4.5 mi^{2}) is land and 0.22% is water.

== Demographics ==
Historical population
Census	Pop.	Note	%±
2020	1,051		—
U.S. Decennial Census

As of the census of 2000, there were 1,141 people, 495 households, and 307 families residing in the CDP. The population density was 98.6/km^{2} (255.3/mi^{2}). There were 567 housing units at an average density of 49.0/km^{2} (126.9/mi^{2}). The racial makeup of the CDP was 97.90% White, 0.09% Black or African American, 0.53% Native American, 0.26% Asian, and 1.23% from two or more races. Hispanic or Latino of any race were 0.79% of the population.

There were 495 households, out of which 28.5% had children under the age of 18 living with them, 49.9% were married couples living together, 9.5% had a female householder with no husband present, and 37.8% were non-families. 34.1% of all households were made up of individuals, and 14.3% had someone living alone who was 65 years of age or older. The average household size was 2.31 and the average family size was 2.98.

In the CDP, the population was spread out, with 24.0% under the age of 18, 6.7% from 18 to 24, 23.7% from 25 to 44, 29.4% from 45 to 64, and 16.3% who were 65 years of age or older. The median age was 43 years. For every 100 females, there were 85.5 males. For every 100 females age 18 and over, there were 80.2 males.

The median income for a household in the CDP was $45,580, and the median income for a family was $56,146. Males had a median income of $41,603 versus $27,308 for females. The per capita income for the CDP was $23,920. About 1.0% of families and 3.9% of the population were below the poverty line, including 3.0% of those under age 18 and 9.4% of those age 65 or over.
