= Richmond, New Hampshire =

- Town
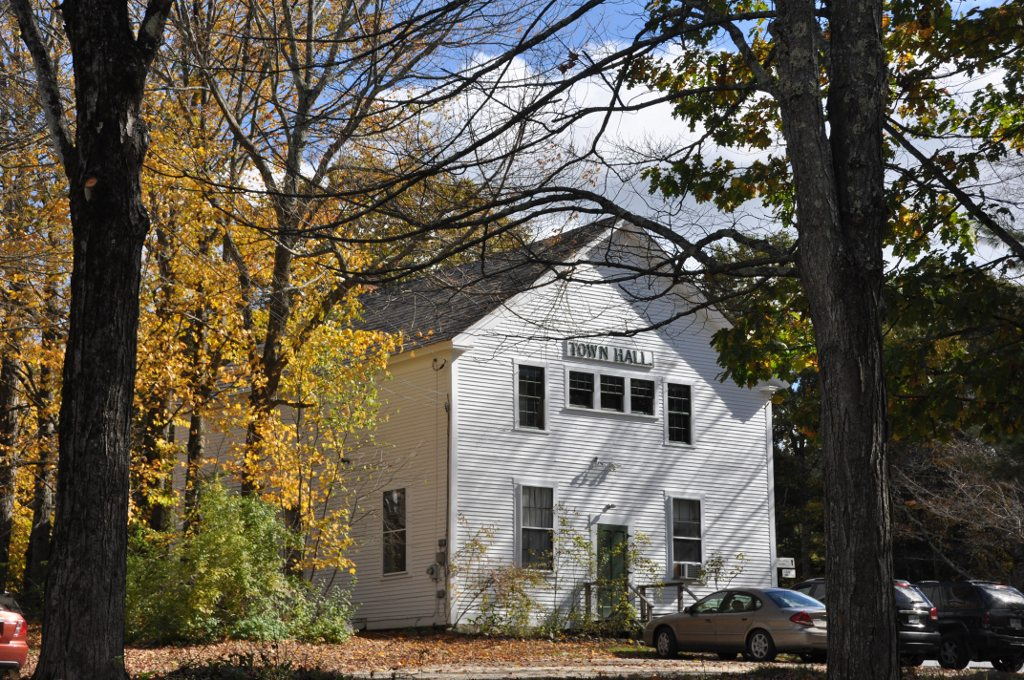
- Town hall

- Seal

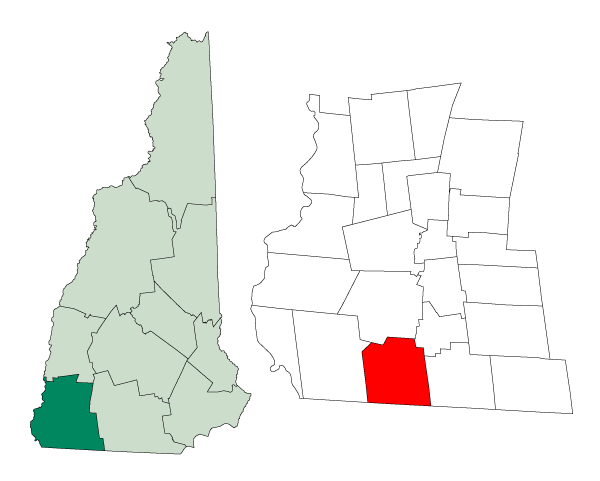
- Location in Cheshire County, New Hampshire
- Coordinates: 42°45′17″N 72°16′18″W
- Country: United States
- State: New Hampshire
- County: Cheshire
- Incorporated: 1752
- Named for: Charles Lennox, 3rd Duke of Richmond
- Villages: Richmond; North Richmond

Area
  - Total: 37.7 sq mi (97.7 km^{2})
  - Land: 37.5 sq mi (97.2 km^{2})
  - Water: 0.19 sq mi (0.5 km^{2}) 0.52%
- Elevation: 1,024 ft (312 m)

Population (2020)
  - Total: 1,197
  - Density: 32/sq mi (12.3/km^{2})
- Time zone: UTC-5 (Eastern)
  - Summer (DST): UTC-4 (Eastern)
- ZIP code: 03470
- Area code: 603
- FIPS code: 33-64420
- GNIS feature ID: 873706
- Website: www.richmond.nh.gov

Richmond is a town in Cheshire County, New Hampshire, United States. The population was 1,197 at the 2020 census, and an estimated 1,234 in 2025.

== History ==
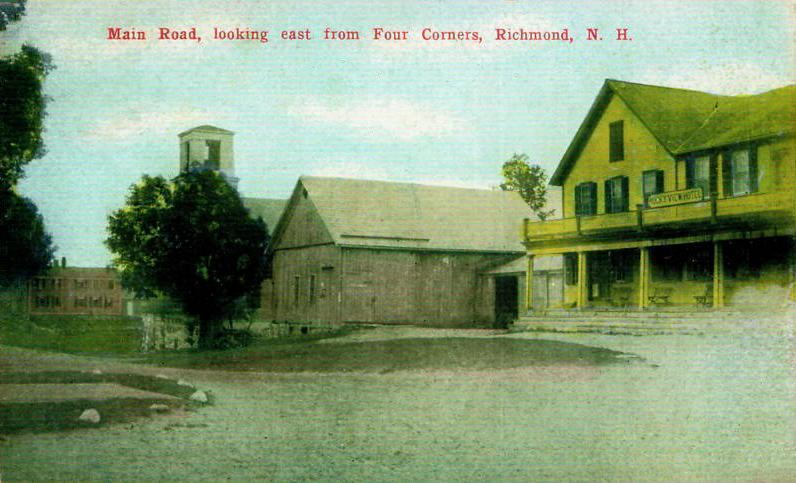
Fitzwilliam Road in 1911

The town was first chartered in 1735 by Governor Jonathan Belcher of Massachusetts. Granted to soldiers returning from the war in Canada, it was named "Sylvester-Canada" in honor of Captain Joseph Sylvester of Scituate, Massachusetts, who was killed in 1690 during an attempt to capture the city of Quebec. After the border between Massachusetts and New Hampshire was fixed, the town fell on the New Hampshire side of the line. It was incorporated in 1752 as "Richmond" by Governor Benning Wentworth. He named it after Charles Lennox, 3rd Duke of Richmond, a staunch advocate of colonial independence. It was settled about 1757 by emigrants from Rhode Island and Massachusetts.

== Geography ==
According to the United States Census Bureau, the town has a total area of 37.7 square miles (97.7 km^{2}), of which 37.5 square miles (97.2 km^{2}) are land and 0.19 square miles (0.5 km^{2}) are water, comprising 0.52% of the town. Little Monadnock Mountain, elevation 1,883 feet (574 m) above sea level, is within a mile of the eastern boundary, in the town of Fitzwilliam. The highest point in Richmond is one mile northwest of Little Monadnock, on an unnamed hill whose elevation is 1,624 feet (495 m) above sea level. The Franconia Mountain Range (not to be confused with the much higher ridge in the White Mountains to the north) is a 1,300-foot-high (400 m) chain of hills in the western part of town.

Richmond is served by state routes 32 and 119.

=== Adjacent municipalities ===
- Swanzey (north)
- Troy (northeast)
- Fitzwilliam (east)
- Royalston, Massachusetts (southeast)
- Warwick, Massachusetts (southwest)
- Winchester (west)

== Demographics ==
Historical population
Census	Pop.	Note	%±
1790	1,380		—
1800	1,390		0.7%
1810	1,290		−7.2%
1820	1,391		7.8%
1830	1,301		−6.5%
1840	1,165		−10.5%
1850	1,128		−3.2%
1860	1,015		−10.0%
1870	868		−14.5%
1880	669		−22.9%
1890	476		−28.8%
1900	459		−3.6%
1910	393		−14.4%
1920	306		−22.1%
1930	241		−21.2%
1940	296		22.8%
1950	259		−12.5%
1960	295		13.9%
1970	287		−2.7%
1980	518		80.5%
1990	877		69.3%
2000	1,077		22.8%
2010	1,155		7.2%
2020	1,197		3.6%
2024 (est.)	1,239		3.5%
U.S. Decennial Census

As of the census of 2000, there were 1,077 people, 379 households, and 285 families residing in the town. The population density was 28.7 inhabitants per square mile (11.1/km^{2}). There were 432 housing units at an average density of 11.5 per square mile (4.4/km^{2}). The racial makeup of the town was 97.68% White, 0.37% African American, 0.46% Native American, 0.19% Asian, 0.19% from other races, and 1.11% from two or more races. Hispanic or Latino of any race were 0.56% of the population.

There were 379 households, out of which 35.1% had children under the age of 18 living with them, 67.5% were married couples living together, 4.5% had a female householder with no husband present, and 24.8% were non-families. 19.3% of all households were made up of individuals, and 5.8% had someone living alone who was 65 years of age or older. The average household size was 2.82 and the average family size was 3.22.

In the town, the population was spread out, with 29.2% under the age of 18, 5.4% from 18 to 24, 28.6% from 25 to 44, 25.5% from 45 to 64, and 11.2% who were 65 years of age or older. The median age was 38 years. For every 100 females, there were 105.5 males. For every 100 females age 18 and over, there were 102.7 males.

The median income for a household in the town was $49,141, and the median income for a family was $54,625. Males had a median income of $37,083 versus $27,500 for females. The per capita income for the town was $21,174. About 4.6% of families and 7.6% of the population were below the poverty line, including 8.5% of those under age 18 and 7.6% of those age 65 or over.

== Religious institutions ==
At Richmond Four Corners, the center of town, is the Richmond Community United Methodist Church, a brick Greek Revival-style edifice built in 1837.

Since 1988, Richmond has been the home of Saint Benedict Center, a traditionalist Catholic community with monastery, convent, chapel, and school. In January 2019, the vicar for canonical affairs for the Roman Catholic Diocese of Manchester stated that the group had been directed to stop representing themselves as Catholic. The diocese of Manchester published a clarification of the status of the Slaves of the Immaculate Heart of Mary and the St. Benedict Center, namely that they were not approved by the diocese nor to be considered Catholic. That same document further states that priests are forbidden to say Mass at any church or chapel owned by the St. Benedict Center or the Slaves of the Immaculate Heart of Mary.

== Notable people ==
- Hosea Ballou (1771–1852), clergyman, theologian
- Horatio Admiral Nelson (1816–1882), merchant, politician in Quebec
- Joseph Weeks (1773–1845), US congressman
