= Troy Village Historic District =

Historic district in New Hampshire, United States

- U.S. National Register of Historic Places
- U.S. Historic district
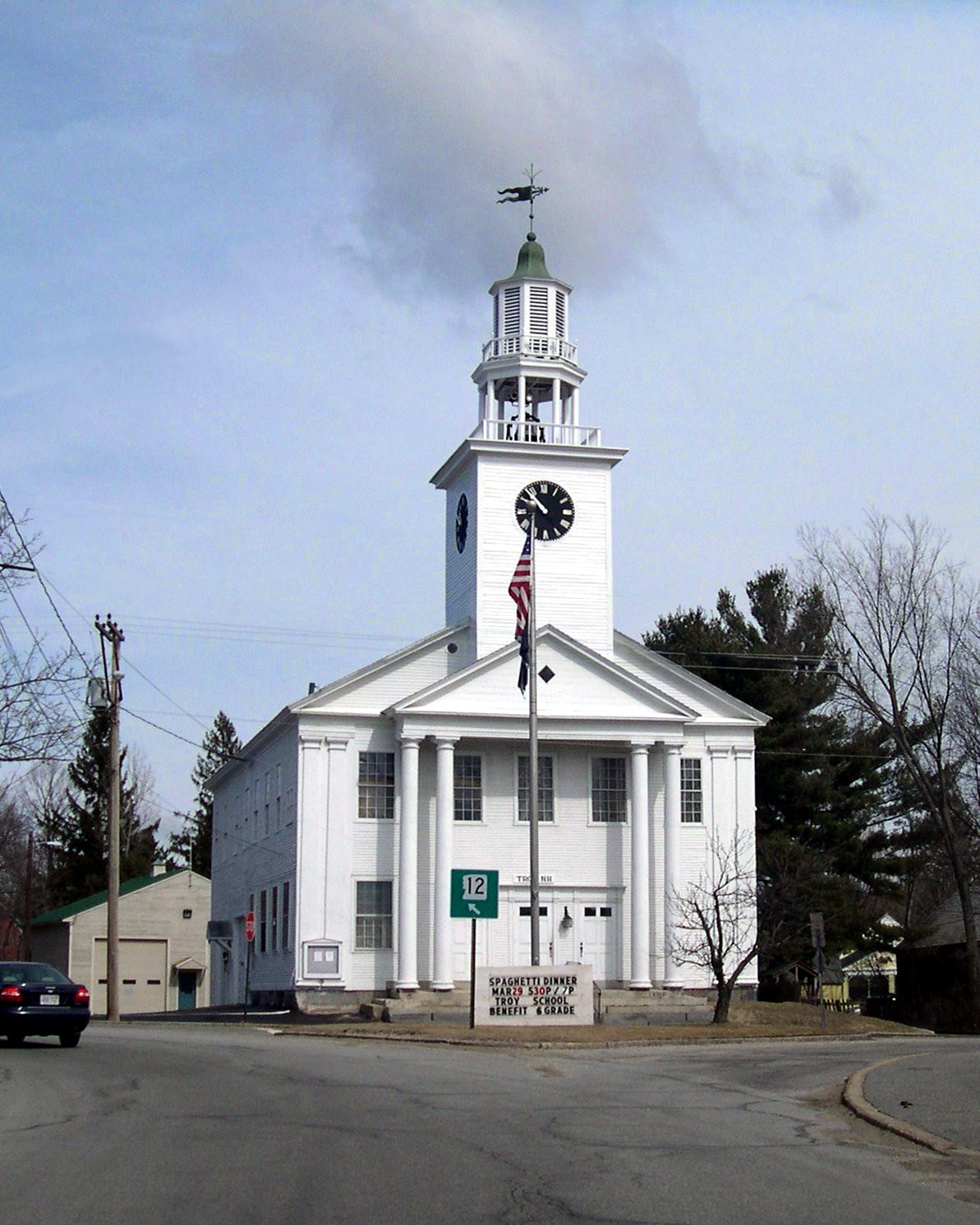
- The Troy Meeting House

- Location within New Hampshire Location within the United States
- Location: Encompassing the village center, mostly along NH 12, Troy, New Hampshire
- Coordinates: 42°49′28″N 72°10′57″W
- Area: 177 acres (72 ha)
- Architect: Forristall, Joseph M.
- Architectural style: Federal, Greek Revival
- NRHP reference No.: 02001500
- Added to NRHP: December 13, 2002

The Troy Village Historic District is a historic district encompassing the historic village center of Troy, New Hampshire, United States. The district is centered along New Hampshire Route 12, north to Marlborough Road and south to the junction with South Main Street. To the east of NH 12 it includes School Street, Mill Street, and Monadnock Street as far as Mill Street, and most of the abutting streets. On the west side it includes Russell, Water, and Prospect streets, and South Main Street nearly to Longmeadow Drive. It was listed on the National Register of Historic Places in 2002.

The village is dominated by residential construction, which mainly consists of 1.5 and 2.5 story wood-frame houses built between about 1850 and the early decades of the 20th century. The village grew where it is because of the ready access to water power, provided by several streams which merge to form the South Branch of the Ashuelot River. Troy was incorporated out of parts of Marlborough and Fitzwilliam in 1815. The heart of the town is its common, created when the town was incorporated. Its economic activity was focused on the mill complexes that developed on Mill Street and Monadnock Street. These initially produced wood products, but in the second half of the 19th century, the greatest period of Troy's growth, textile processing became increasingly important. Business benefited from the arrival of the railroad in the late 1840s, which also brought tourists to the area.

== See also ==
- National Register of Historic Places listings in Cheshire County, New Hampshire
