= Troy (CDP), New Hampshire =

Census-designated place in New Hampshire, United States

Troy, New Hampshire
- Census-designated place
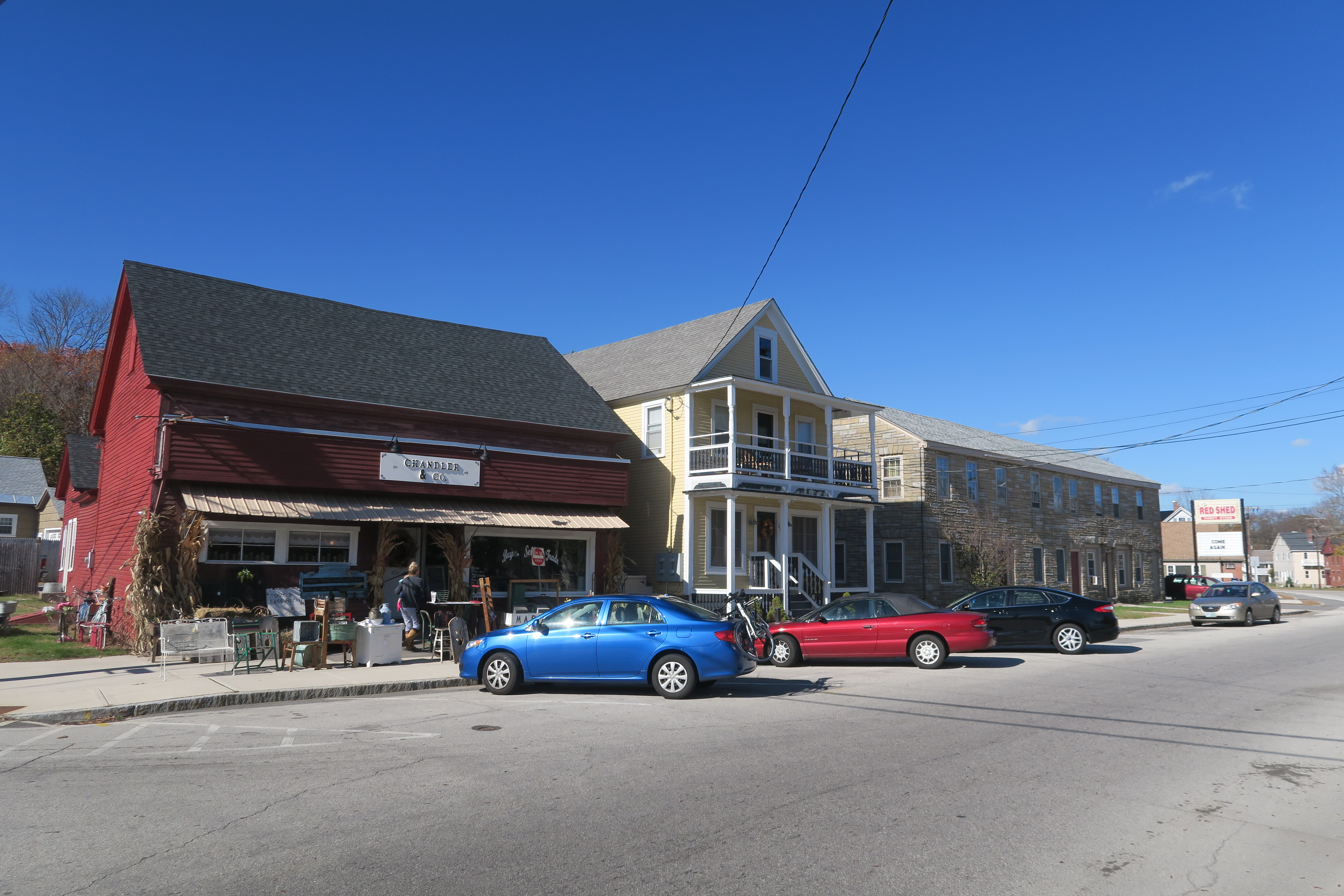
- Chandler & Co.

- Location within New Hampshire Location within the United States
- Coordinates: 42°49′33″N 72°10′58″W
- Country: United States
- State: New Hampshire
- County: Cheshire
- Town: Troy

Area
  - Total: 1.27 sq mi (3.30 km^{2})
  - Land: 1.27 sq mi (3.30 km^{2})
  - Water: 0 sq mi (0.00 km^{2})
- Elevation: 1,007 ft (307 m)

Population (2020)
  - Total: 1,108
  - Density: 868.5/sq mi (335.34/km^{2})
- Time zone: UTC-5 (Eastern (EST))
  - Summer (DST): UTC-4 (EDT)
- ZIP code: 03465
- Area code: 603
- FIPS code: 33-77300
- GNIS feature ID: 2629742

Troy is a census-designated place (CDP) and the main village in the town of Troy, New Hampshire, United States. The population of the CDP was 1,108 at the 2020 census, compared to 2,130 in the entire town. The center of the CDP is the Troy Village Historic District.

== Geography ==
The CDP is in the center of the town of Troy, in the valley of the South Branch Ashuelot River, where it is joined by Rockwood Brook and Nester Brook. It is part of the Connecticut River watershed. The CDP extends north up Marlboro Road as far as its crossing of the South Branch. The western side of the CDP encompasses the residences on Old Whitcomb Road and Deacon's Lane, then turns down Milind Lane to High Street and Richmond Road. It then turns southeast down an unnamed brook to Nester Brook, which it follows east to Rockwood Brook just south of the village center. The CDP border runs south up Rockwood Brook, then cuts east, south of Memorial Drive, to Main Street (a dead-end road), which it follows south to a power line near the Fitzwilliam town line. The eastern side of the CDP runs north along the South Branch of the Ashuelot all the way to Monadnock Street near the center of town, then follows Dort Street before cutting back to the South Branch again and the former railroad line back to Marlboro Road.

New Hampshire Route 12 is the main road through the community, leading northwest 9 miles (14 km) to Keene and southeast 12 miles (19 km) to Winchendon, Massachusetts.

According to the U.S. Census Bureau, the Troy CDP has a total area of 1.3 square miles (3.3 km^{2}), all of it land, except for streams.

== Demographics ==
Historical population
Census	Pop.	Note	%±
2010	1,221		—
2020	1,108		−9.3%
U.S. Decennial Census

As of the census of 2010, there were 1,221 people, 491 households, and 308 families residing in the CDP. There were 528 housing units, of which 37, or 7.0%, were vacant. The racial makeup of the town was 96.5% White, 0.9% African American, 1.3% Native American, 1.0% Asian, 0.0% Pacific Islander, 0.0% some other race, and 0.3% from two or more races. 1.1% of the population were Hispanic or Latino of any race.

Of the 491 households in the CDP, 34.4% had children under the age of 18 living with them, 44.6% were headed by married couples living together, 13.6% had a female householder with no husband present, and 37.3% were non-families. 28.5% of all households were made up of individuals, and 8.9% were someone living alone who was 65 years of age or older. The average household size was 2.49, and the average family size was 3.06.

25.6% of people in the CDP were under the age of 18, 8.7% were from 18 to 24, 28.8% were from 25 to 44, 25.8% were from 45 to 64, and 11.0% were 65 years of age or older. The median age was 34.7 years. For every 100 females, there were 97.6 males. For every 100 females age 18 and over, there were 92.2 males.

For the period 2011–15, the estimated median annual income for a household was $55,677, and the median income for a family was $56,500. Male full-time workers had a median income of $46,679 versus $27,283 for females. The per capita income for the CDP was $29,768. 13.1% of the population and 10.1% of families were below the poverty line, along with 31.2% of people under the age of 18 and 10.8% of people 65 or older.
