= List of National Natural Landmarks in New Hampshire =

There are 11 National Natural Landmarks in New Hampshire.

New Hampshire National Natural Landmarks (clickable map)

Name	Image	Date	Location	County	Ownership	Description
East Inlet Natural Area		1972	45.211385°N 71.110497°W	Coos	Private	Contains a black spruce-tamarack bog and a virgin, balsam fir-red spruce forest.
Floating Island		1972		Coos	Federal	A floating heath bog in Umbagog National Wildlife Refuge.
Franconia Notch	Franconia Notch	1971	Franconia 44.1707°N 71.6881°W	Grafton	State	An old stream valley, ground to a U-shape by glacial movement.
Heath Pond Bog		1972	43.759423°N 71.116465°W	Carroll	State	A classic example of bog succession from open water to sphagnum-heath-black spruce bog.
Madison Boulder	Madison Boulder	1970	43.93329°N 71.162671°W	Carroll	State	The largest known glacial erratic in North America.
Mount Monadnock	Mount Monadnock Summit	1987	42.860833°N 72.108056°W	Cheshire	Mixed- state, municipal, private	A prominent, isolated, relict mountain. Type locality of a monadnock.
Nancy Brook Virgin Spruce Forest and Scenic Area		1987		Carroll, Grafton	Federal	May be the largest virgin forest tract in the northeastern United States. A part of White Mountain National Forest.
Pondicherry Wildlife Refuge	Pondicherry Wildlife Refuge	1972	44.377846°N 71.525937°W	Coos	State	Two shallow, warm water ponds, surrounded by marsh, bog and forest that support a great variety of birds.
Rhododendron Natural Area		1982	Fitzwilliam 42.7804°N 72.1889°W	Cheshire	State	The largest, thriving stand of rhododendron in central and southern New England.
Spruce Hole Bog	Spruce Hole Bog	1972	43.126111°N 70.967778°W	Strafford	Municipal	The last known kettle hole bog in southern New Hampshire.
White Lake Pitch Pine		1980	43.8359°N 71.2089°W	Carroll	State	A mature, undisturbed pitch pine and bear-oak forest.

== See also ==
- List of National Historic Landmarks in New Hampshire
