= East Swanzey, New Hampshire =

Unincorporated community in New Hampshire, United States

- Unincorporated community
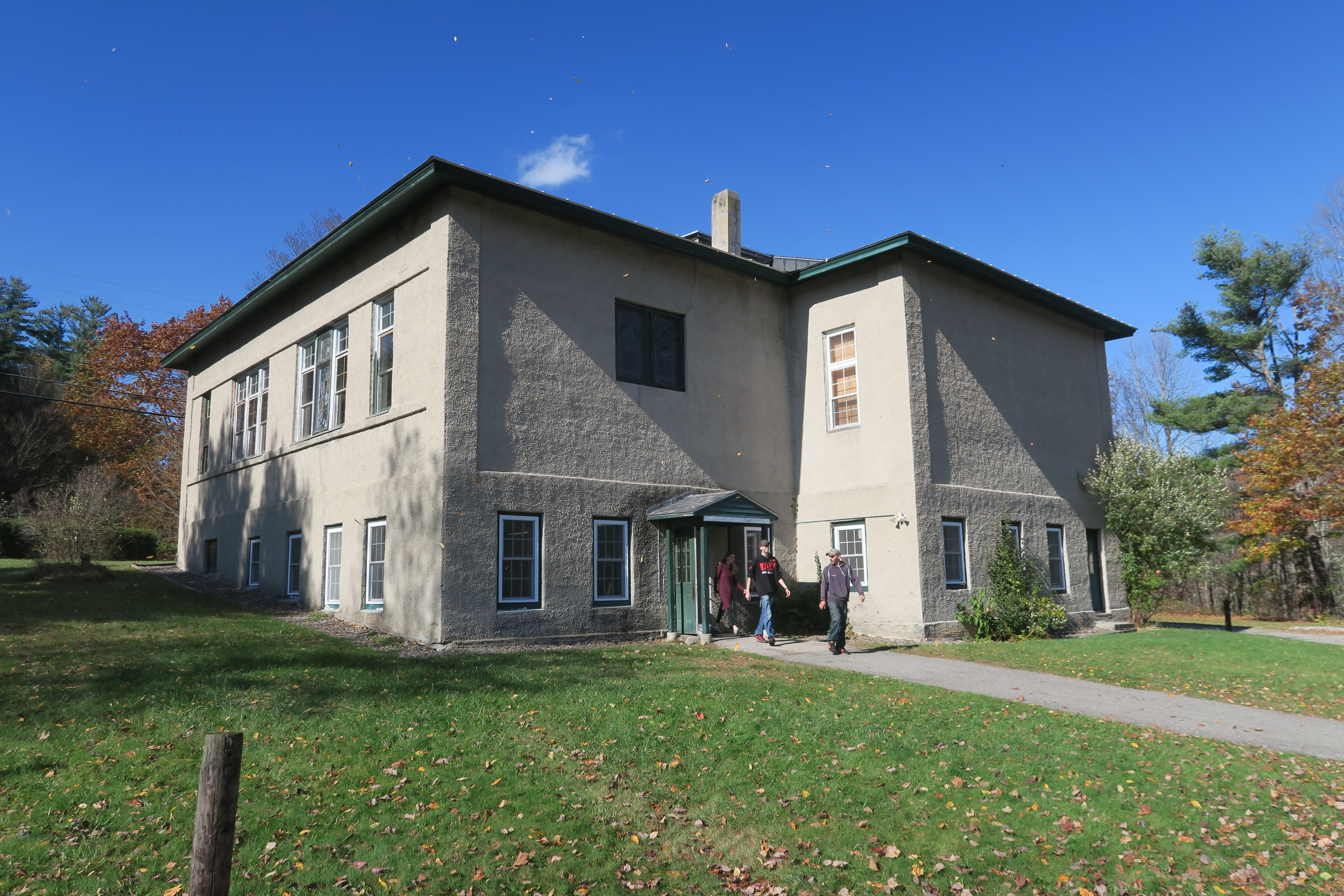
- Community House

- Location within New Hampshire Location within the United States
- Coordinates: 42°51′5″N 72°15′32″W
- Country: United States
- State: New Hampshire
- County: Cheshire
- Town: Swanzey
- Elevation: 558 ft (170 m)
- Time zone: UTC-5 (Eastern (EST))
  - Summer (DST): UTC-4 (EDT)
- ZIP code: 03446 (Swanzey)
- Area code: 603
- GNIS feature ID: 866729

East Swanzey is an unincorporated community in the town of Swanzey in Cheshire County, New Hampshire, United States.

The village is located in the eastern portion of Swanzey, along the South Branch Ashuelot River, between New Hampshire Route 32 to the west and New Hampshire Route 12 to the northeast.

East Swanzey has a separate ZIP code (03446) from other areas, such as West Swanzey, in the town of Swanzey.
