= Troy, New Hampshire =

- Town
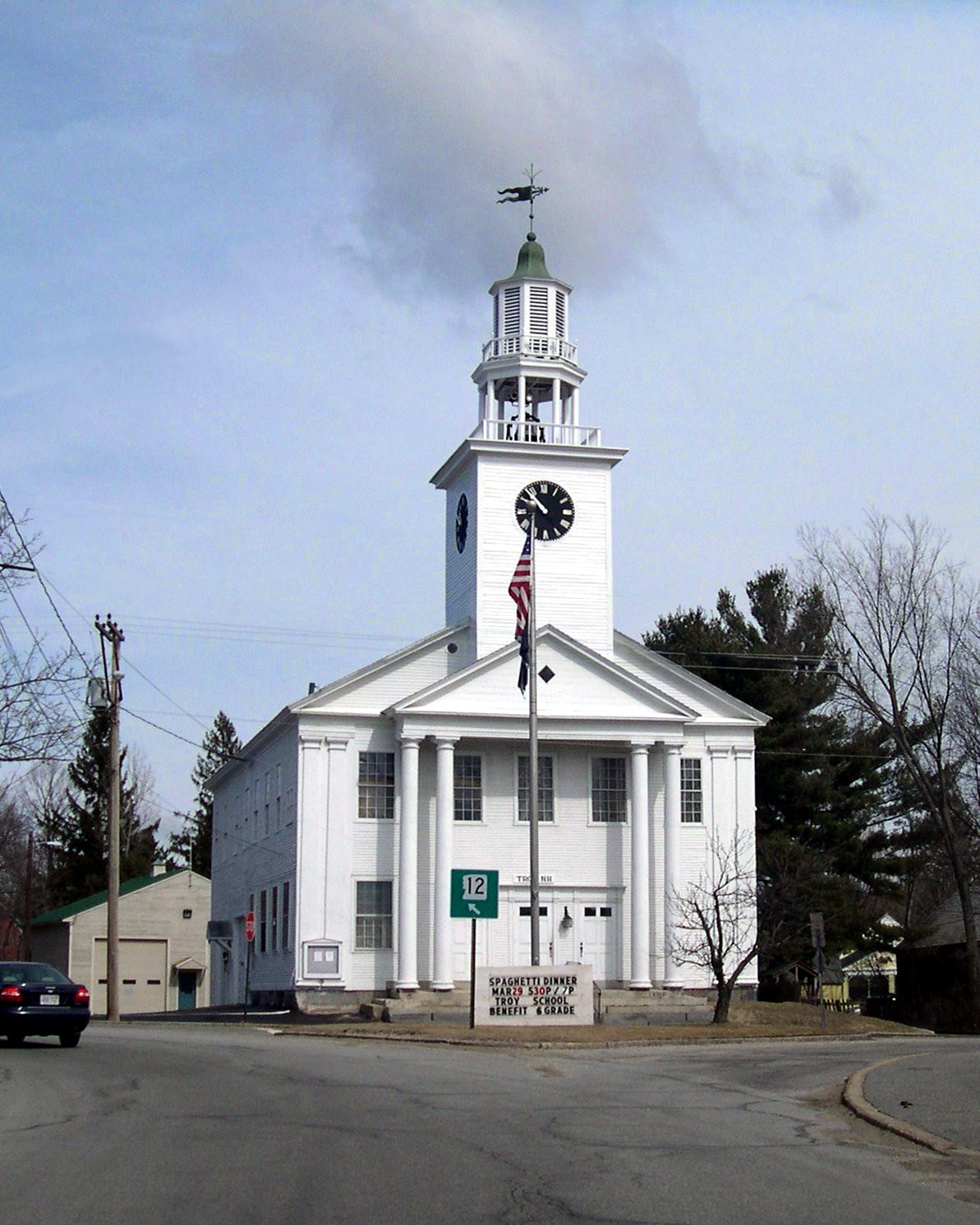
- Town Hall

- Seal
- Motto: "Heart of the Monadnock Region"
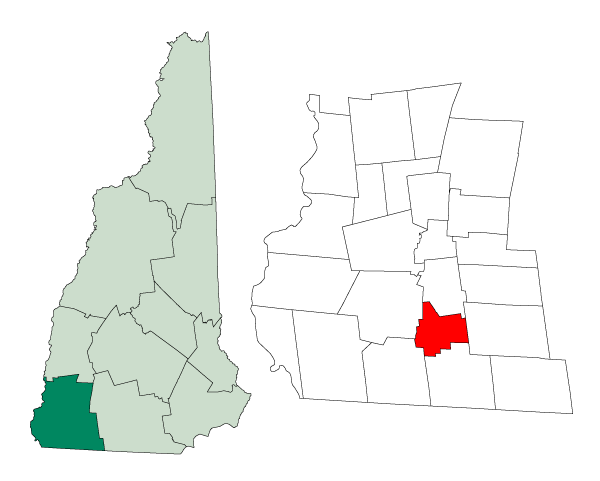
- Location in Cheshire County, New Hampshire
- Coordinates: 42°49′36″N 72°11′24″W
- Country: United States
- State: New Hampshire
- County: Cheshire
- Incorporated: 1815
- Villages: Troy; Bowkerville

Area
  - Total: 17.6 sq mi (45.6 km^{2})
  - Land: 17.5 sq mi (45.2 km^{2})
  - Water: 0.15 sq mi (0.4 km^{2}) 0.89%
- Elevation: 1,132 ft (345 m)

Population (2020)
  - Total: 2,130
  - Density: 122/sq mi (47.1/km^{2})
- Time zone: UTC-5 (Eastern)
  - Summer (DST): UTC-4 (Eastern)
- ZIP code: 03465
- Area code: 603
- FIPS code: 33-77380
- GNIS feature ID: 873740
- Website: www.troy-nh.us

Troy is a town in Cheshire County, New Hampshire, United States. The population was 2,130 at the 2020 census, and an estimated 2,198 in 2025. It is situated in southwestern New Hampshire, west of Mount Monadnock.

The town's central village, where 1,108 people resided at the 2020 census, is defined as the Troy census-designated place (CDP), and is located along New Hampshire Route 12. The center of the CDP is listed on the National Register of Historic Places as the Troy Village Historic District.

== History ==
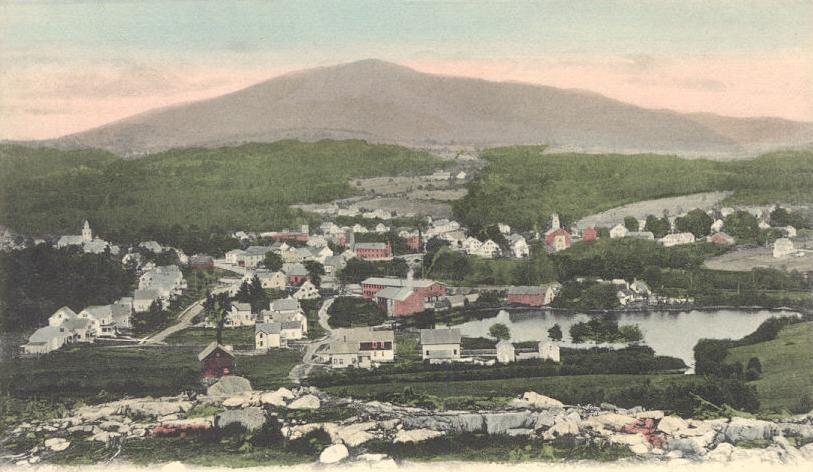
Bird's-eye view c. 1905

Settled in 1762, by 1815 the community had grown so much that it sought its own incorporation. It was set off from Marlborough that year, and included parts of Fitzwilliam, Swanzey and Richmond. A prominent citizen and friend of Governor John Taylor Gilman, Captain Benjamin Mann of Mason, suggested the name "Troy". His daughter, Betsy, was married to Samuel Wilson, famous as "Uncle Sam", and at that time a resident of Troy, New York. At least seven members of Wilson's family were living in the town at the time, thus securing the name. The town hall, built in 1813–1814 near the rail-fenced common, was originally the village meetinghouse.

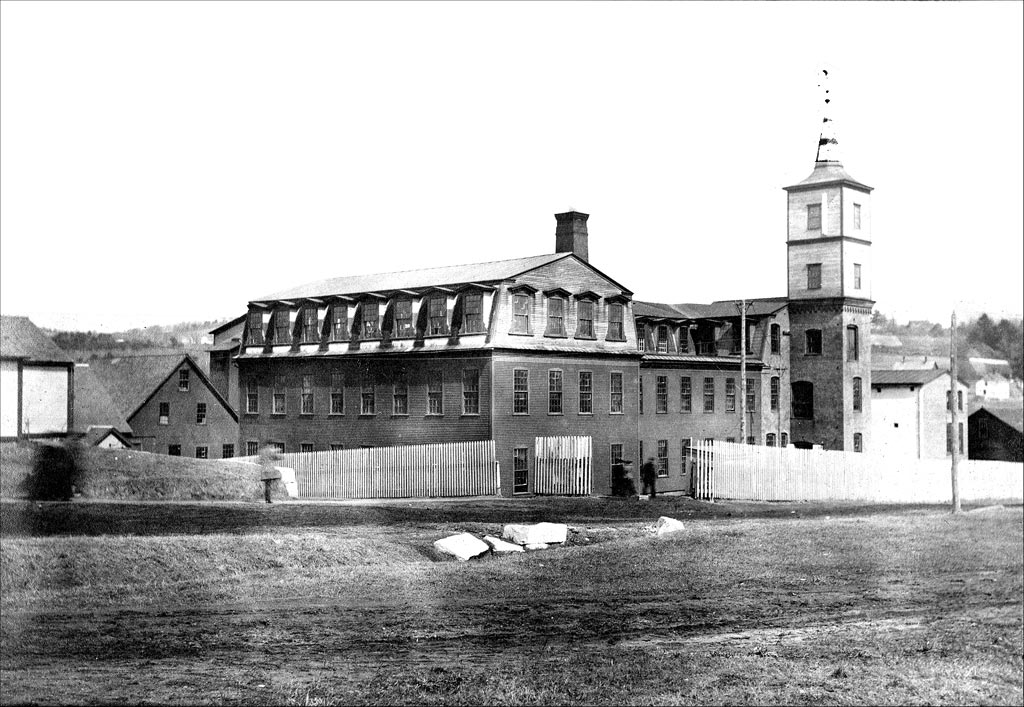
Troy Blanket Mill

Troy Mills, which started making horse blankets in the mid-19th century, served as the backbone of the town's economy for nearly 100 years. In 1865, the company was sold by founder Thomas Goodall, who in 1867 would establish Goodall Mills in Sanford, Maine. Troy Mills declared bankruptcy in late 2001 and ceased operations in 2002. The giant mill complex on Monadnock Street housed two smaller spin-offs of Troy Mills—Knowlton Nonwovens and Cosmopolitan Textiles for several years after. The Troy trademark is now used for felt made by a company in West Virginia. Wooden-ware, pottery and fine building stone were also once the products of Troy industries. As of 2024, Troy Mills was being renovated into affordable apartments for low-income families.

== Geography ==
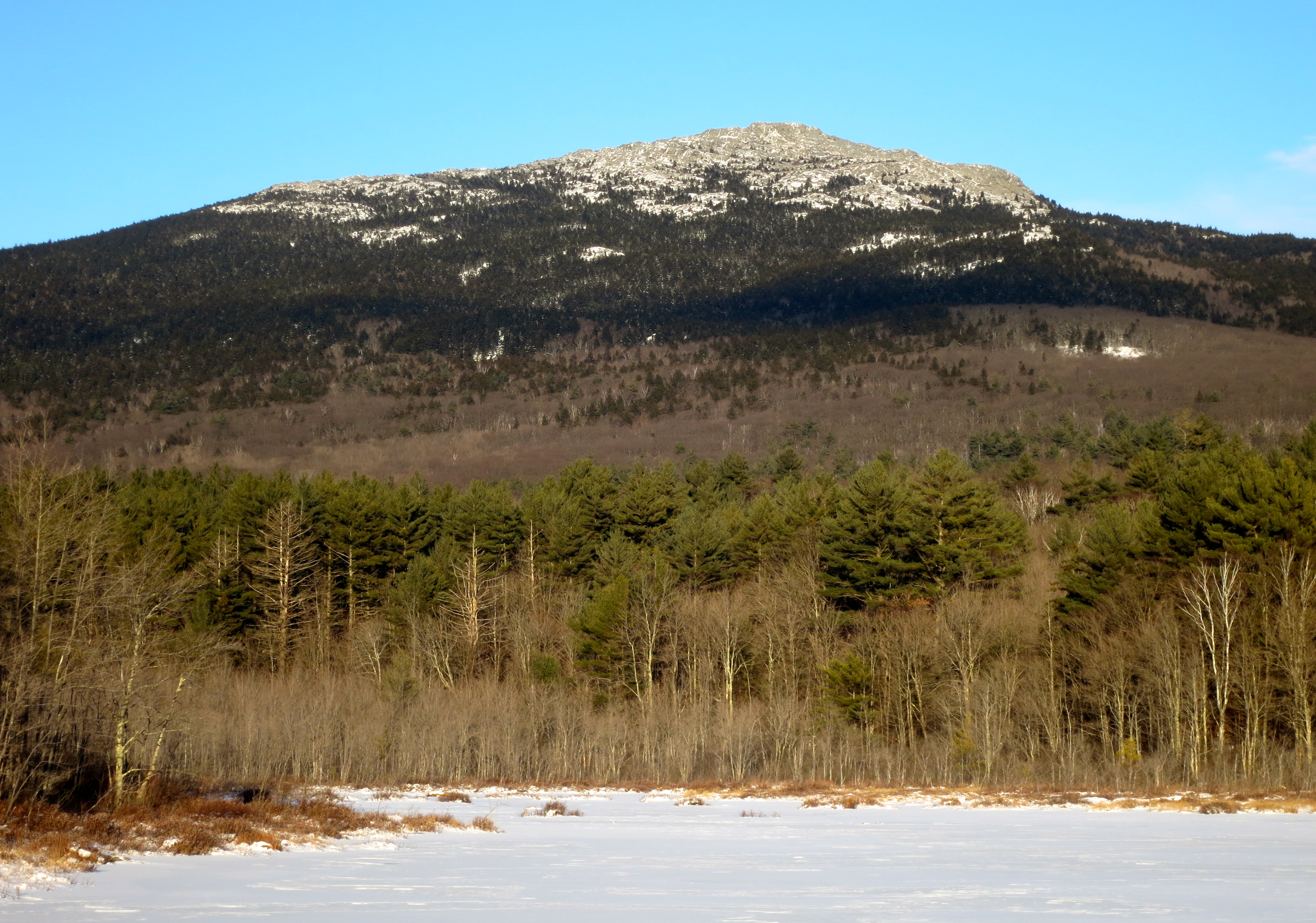
Mt. Monadnock from Perkins Pond causeway on Route 124

According to the United States Census Bureau, the town has a total area of 17.6 square miles (45.6 km^{2}), of which 17.5 square miles (45.2 km^{2}) are land and 0.2 square miles (0.4 km^{2}) are water, comprising 0.89% of the town. Troy is drained by the South Branch of the Ashuelot River and is part of the Connecticut River watershed.

The highest point in town is the south summit of Gap Mountain, at 1,900 feet (580 m) above sea level, near the eastern border. The summit of Mount Monadnock is 2 miles (3 km) northeast of the town in Jaffrey.

Troy is crossed by New Hampshire Route 12 and New Hampshire Route 124. NH 12 passes through the center of town and leads northwest 9 miles (14 km) to Keene and southeast 12 miles (19 km) to Winchendon, Massachusetts, while NH 124, crossing the northeast corner of the town, leads northwest 6 miles (10 km) to the center of Marlborough and east 6 miles (10 km) to the center of Jaffrey.

=== Adjacent municipalities ===
- Marlborough (north)
- Jaffrey (east)
- Fitzwilliam (south)
- Richmond (southwest)
- Swanzey (west)

== Demographics ==
Historical population
Census	Pop.	Note	%±
1820	676		—
1830	676		0.0%
1840	683		1.0%
1850	759		11.1%
1860	761		0.3%
1870	767		0.8%
1880	796		3.8%
1890	999		25.5%
1900	1,527		52.9%
1910	1,331		−12.8%
1920	1,444		8.5%
1930	1,267		−12.3%
1940	1,321		4.3%
1950	1,360		3.0%
1960	1,445		6.3%
1970	1,713		18.5%
1980	2,131		24.4%
1990	2,097		−1.6%
2000	1,962		−6.4%
2010	2,145		9.3%
2020	2,130		−0.7%
2024 (est.)	2,198		3.2%
U.S. Decennial Census

As of the census of 2010, there were 2,145 people, 867 households, and 568 families residing in the town. The population density was 123.1 inhabitants per square mile (47.5/km^{2}). There were 932 housing units at an average density of 53.5 per square mile (20.7/km^{2}). The racial makeup of the town was 97.0% White, 0.8% African American, 0.7% Native American, 0.9% Asian, 0.05% some other race, and 0.5% from two or more races. Hispanic or Latino of any race were 1.3% of the population. As of the 2000 census, 18.7% were of American, 13.4% French, 11.8% English, 10.6% Irish, 8.4% French Canadian, 8.2% Finnish and 7.0% Italian ancestry.

At the 2010 census there were 867 households, out of which 31.5% had children under the age of 18 living with them, 49.3% were headed by married couples living together, 11.2% had a female householder with no husband present, and 34.5% were non-families. 26.2% of all households were made up of individuals, and 7.6% were someone living alone who was 65 years of age or older. The average household size was 2.47, and the average family size was 2.96.

In the town, the population was spread out, with 23.1% under the age of 18, 8.1% from 18 to 24, 28.5% from 25 to 44, 29.0% from 45 to 64, and 11.5% who were 65 years of age or older. The median age was 37.8 years. For every 100 females, there were 99.7 males. For every 100 females age 18 and over, there were 97.8 males.

For the period 2010–2014, the estimated median annual income for a household in the town was $55,043, and the median income for a family was $59,750. Male full-time workers had a median income of $45,800 versus $28,359 for females. The per capita income for the town was $29,045. About 4.9% of families and 8.5% of the population were below the poverty line, including 12.6% of those under age 18 and 17.3% of those age 65 or over.

== Education ==
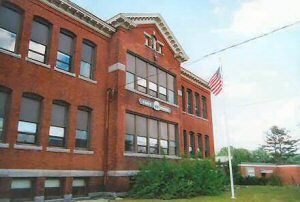
Troy Elementary School

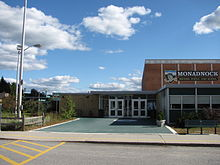
Monadnock Regional Middle-High School

Residents of Troy attending public high school go to Troy Elementary school for kindergarten through sixth grade, and Monadnock Regional High School for seventh grade onwards. Both schools are part of the Monadnock Regional School District (SAU93). Troy is the second largest town in the Monadnock Regional School District, the largest being Swanzey. Other towns in the school district are Fitzwilliam, Gilsum, Richmond and Roxbury.

The elementary school is located in Troy, whereas the middle-high school is to the north in the town of Swanzey. Troy School has been educating the children of Troy since 1895 when it was built to house 225 children of all ages. Troy School presently accommodates approximately 135 students in grades K–6. The school day starts at 8:30 AM and ends at 3:10 PM. Students may enter the building at 8:15 AM to have breakfast and get ready for class.

The town of Troy also has two 2015 NH licensed child care facilities with a capacity for up to 75 children.

== Notable person ==
- Ira Allen Eastman (1809–1881), member of the House of Representatives
