= Richmond Community Church =

Historic church in New Hampshire, United States

- U.S. National Register of Historic Places
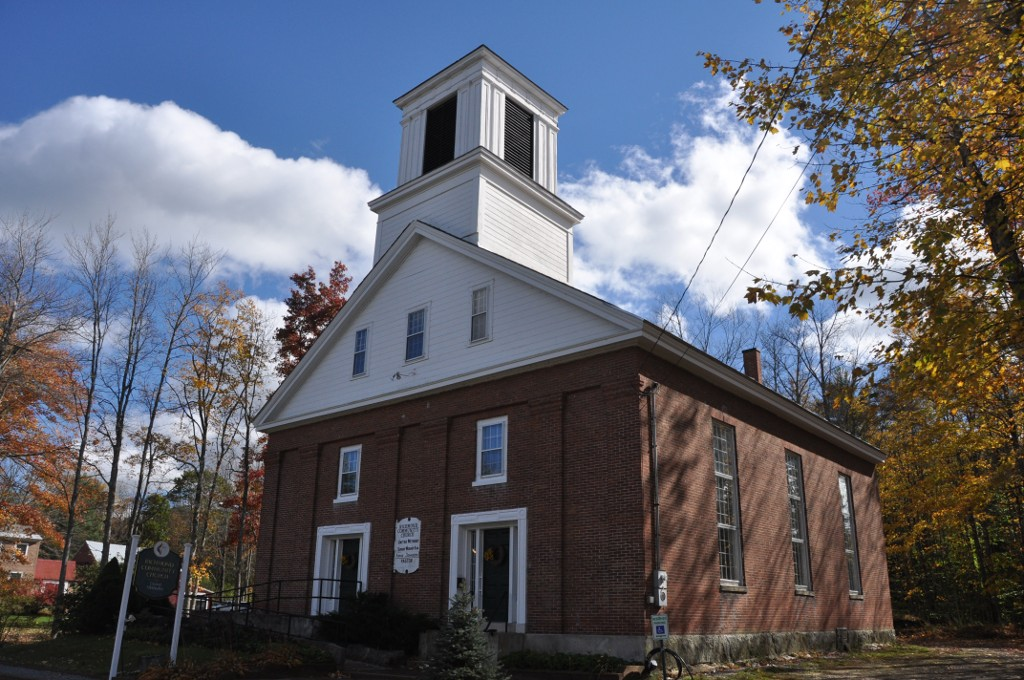
- Richmond Community Church in 2012

- Location within New Hampshire Location within the United States
- Location: Fitzwilliam Rd., Richmond, New Hampshire
- Coordinates: 42°45′16″N 72°16′17″W
- Area: 0.3 acres (0.12 ha)
- Built: 1838
- Architect: Timothy Pickering
- Architectural style: Greek Revival
- NRHP reference No.: 83001136
- Added to NRHP: March 24, 1983

The Richmond Community Church is a historic church building on Fitzwilliam Road (New Hampshire Route 119) in Richmond, New Hampshire, United States. Built in 1838, it is a distinctive regionally early example of Greek Revival church architecture executed in brick. The church was listed on the National Register of Historic Places in 1983. It is now owned by a Methodist congregation.

== Description and history ==
The Richmond Community Church is located in the village center of Richmond, on the south side of Fitzwilliam Road a poor way east of its junction with Alford Road and Old Homestead Highway. It is a single-story brick structure, with a gabled roof and clapboarded gable ends. Its main facade faces north toward the road and is two bays wide. Each bay is flanked by simple brick pilasters, which also appear at the building corners. The bays each house a building entrance with sidelight windows on the ground floor, and sash windows at the gallery level. A square two-stage wood-frame tower rises above the facade.

The church was built in 1838 by a Unitarian congregation, which sold a half interest in the building to the First Baptist Society before the building was completed. It is the earliest in a series of brick churches built at the time in New Hampshire in the Connecticut River valley region, probably built under the influence of earlier work of Lebanon, New Hampshire native Ammi Burnham Young. It is distinguished from earlier Federal style churches by the pilasters on the corners and on the front facade.

== See also ==
- National Register of Historic Places listings in Cheshire County, New Hampshire
