= Fitzwilliam Common Historic District =

Historic district in New Hampshire, United States

- U.S. National Register of Historic Places
- U.S. Historic district
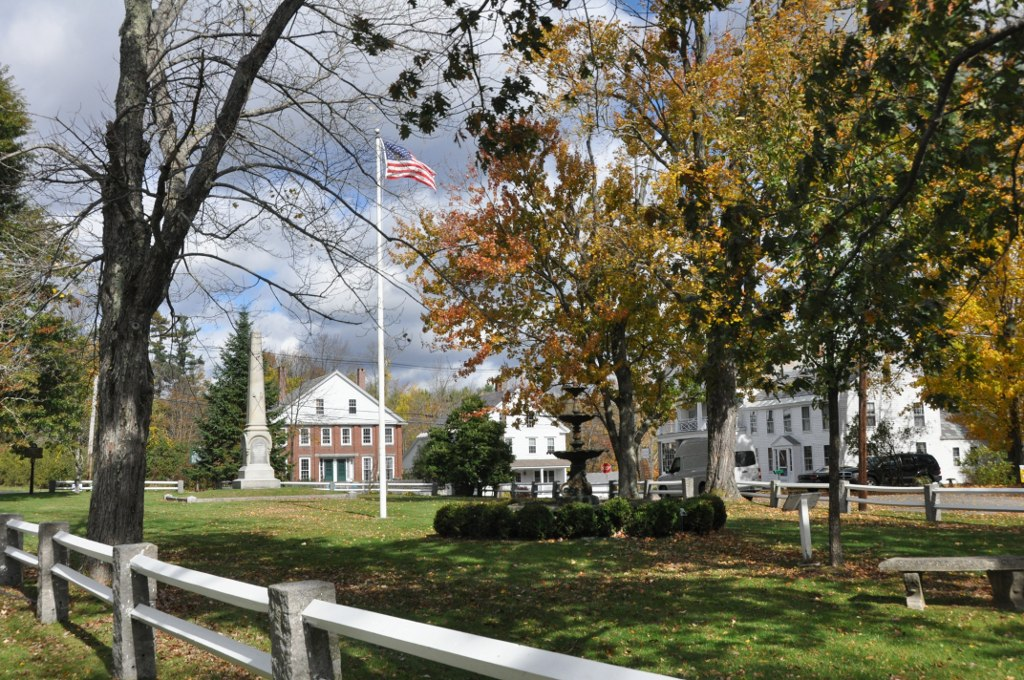

- Location within New Hampshire Location within the United States
- Location: Jct. of NH 119, Richmond Rd., and Templeton Hwy., Fitzwilliam, New Hampshire
- Coordinates: 42.77943°N 72.145°W
- Area: 13 acres (5.3 ha)
- Architectural style: Greek Revival, Federal, Italianate
- NRHP reference No.: 97000399
- Added to NRHP: May 2, 1997

The Fitzwilliam Common Historic District encompasses the historic heart of the small town of Fitzwilliam, New Hampshire. The district covers about 13 acres (5.3 ha), and includes the town common, laid out in 1765, and the buildings arrayed around it. The district was listed on the National Register of Historic Places in 1997.

Although the territory that is now Fitzwilliam was first granted in 1752, it was not settled until 1765 due to a significant number of Indian raids in the area until after the French and Indian War. Its center became the crossing point of a number of turnpikes in the first half of the 19th century, which is when most of the buildings around the common were built. Most of the buildings around the common are either Federal or Greek Revival in their styling. There are only two buildings with later styling, both Italianate: the c. 1870 Henry House, and the 1857 Fitzwilliam Community Church. The Connelly House, a c. 1795 house, was restyled in the 1830s with Greek Revival features.

Prominent public buildings on the common include the 1817 town hall, separately listed on the National Register, the public library, built as a private home in 1804 and sold to the town in 1912, and an early fire engine house from c. 1827. Notable commercial buildings include the Fitzwilliam Inn (1843) and the Fitzwilliam Market (1859).

== See also ==
- National Register of Historic Places listings in Cheshire County, New Hampshire
