= Little Monadnock Mountain =

Mountain in the American state of New Hampshire

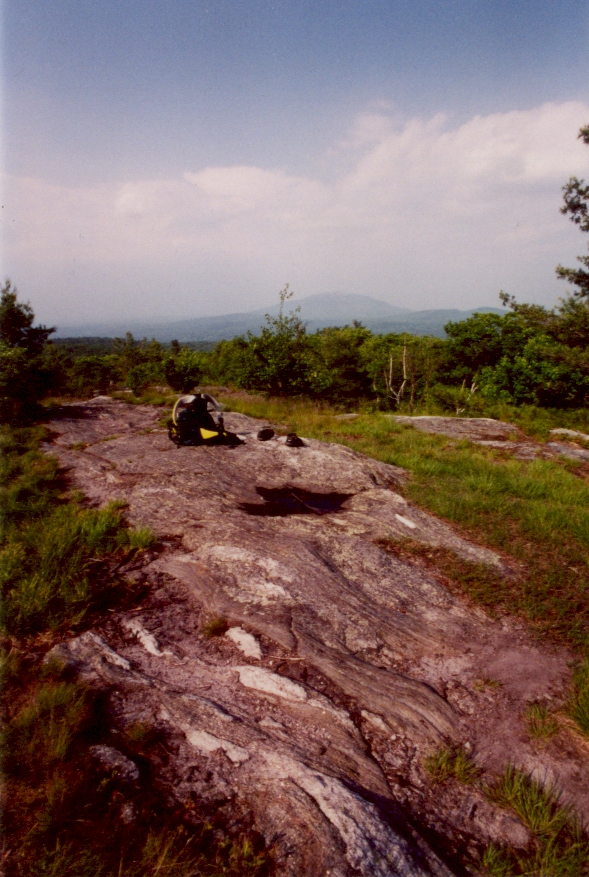
- View of Mount Monadnock from Little Monadnock

Highest point
- Elevation: 1890+ ft (576+ m)
- Coordinates: 42°47′23″N 72°12′21″W

Geography
- Location: Troy and Fitzwilliam, New Hampshire
- Parent range: Central New England upland
- Topo map: USGS Monadnock Mountain

Geology
- Rock age: 400 million years
- Mountain type(s): Monadnock; metamorphic rock

Climbing
- Easiest route: Path from Rhododendron State Park

Little Monadnock Mountain, 1,900 feet (579 m), is located in the towns of Fitzwilliam and Troy, New Hampshire. Most of the mountain is located within Rhododendron State Park; there are scenic vistas from ledges just below the summit. The 110 mile Metacomet-Monadnock Trail crosses the mountain.

The mountain is flanked by Gap Mountain four miles northeast and by the Franconia Range (not the major ridge in the White Mountains), 4.5 miles to the west; its south and east slopes drain into the Tully River, then to the Millers River, thence to the Connecticut River and Long Island Sound, while its north and west slopes drain into the Ashuelot River, thence to the Connecticut River.

== Hiking ==
The summit ledges of Little Monadnock Mountain are accessible via the Metacomet-Monadnock Trail or by the shorter route from the Rhododendron State Park headquarters/trailhead in Fitzwilliam (1.2 mi/1.9 km to the summit). A loop (4.1 mi/6.5 km) via both trails is possible. The mountain is open to hiking, picnicking, and snowshoeing in the winter. Leashed pets are allowed in Rhododendron State Park.

== Conservation ==
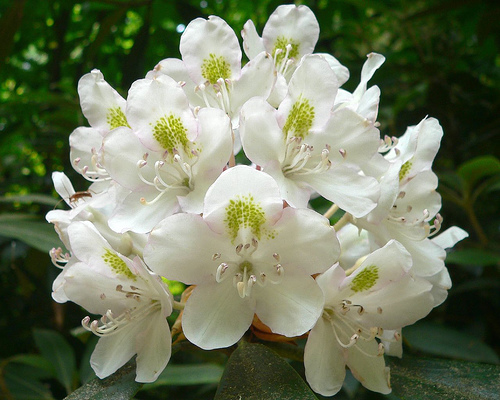
Rhododendron maximum

Rhododendron State Park features the largest natural grove of native rhododendron in northern New England. The grove has been recognized as a National Natural Landmark. A loop trail through the grove is accessible from the park trailhead.

== See also ==
- Mount Monadnock
- Gap Mountain
- Royalston Falls
