= Third Fitzwilliam Meetinghouse =

Historic church in New Hampshire, United States

- U.S. National Register of Historic Places
- U.S. Historic district – Contributing property
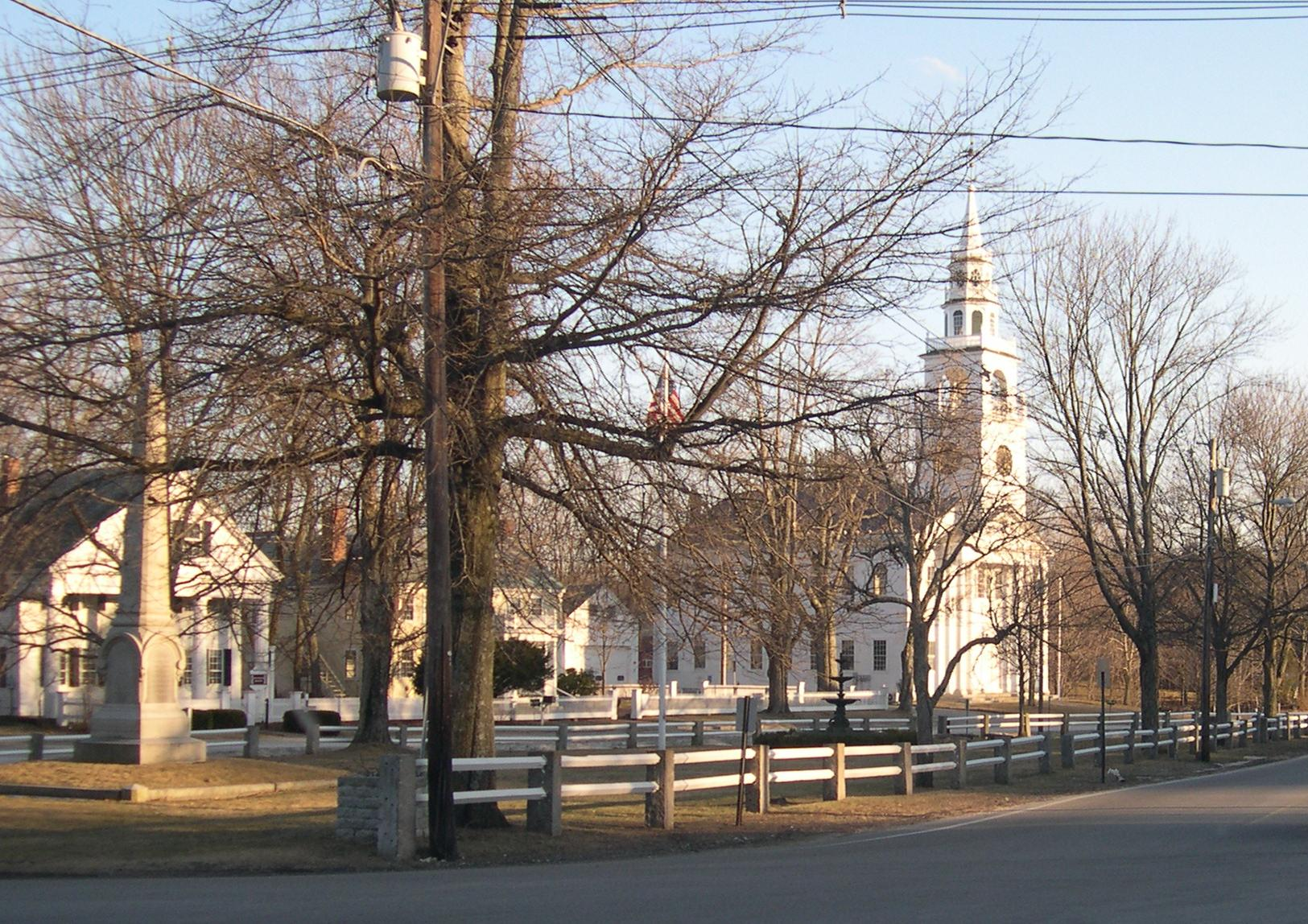

- Location within New Hampshire Location within the United States
- Location: Village Green, Fitzwilliam, New Hampshire
- Coordinates: 42°46′46″N 72°8′41″W
- Area: 1 acre (0.40 ha)
- Built: 1817
- Architect: Kendall, Samuel; Elias Carter
- Architectural style: Greek Revival
- Part of: Fitzwilliam Common Historic District (ID97000399)
- NRHP reference No.: 77000162

Significant dates
- Added to NRHP: August 26, 1977
- Designated CP: May 2, 1997

The Third Fitzwilliam Meetinghouse is a historic meeting house on the village green in Fitzwilliam, New Hampshire. It presently serves as Fitzwilliam Town Hall. Built in 1817, it is a high-quality example of period church architecture, based closely on the work of regionally noted architect Elias Carter. The building was listed on the National Register of Historic Places in 1977, and was included in the Fitzwilliam Common Historic District in 1997.

== Description and history ==
The Third Fitzwilliam Meetinghouse occupies a prominent location in the town's village center, on the east side of the village green near its southern end. It is a two-story timber-frame structure, with a gabled roof and clapboarded exterior. It is a rectangular structure with a projecting Greek Revival temple front with four columns and a triangular pediment. A four-stage tower rises above the front facade, with a clock (given in 1861) in the first stage, and a Paul Revere bell hangs in the second stage belfry, an open section with round arches on all four sides.

Fitzwilliam's first meetinghouse was built in the early 1770s, and was replaced by its second one in 1816. That building was destroyed by fire after only nine weeks of use, resulting in the construction of this one the following year. Both the 1816 and 1817 buildings are believed to be faithful replicas of a church designed by Elias Carter and built in Templeton, Massachusetts. This church design was particularly influential in a series of church buildings erected in the early decades of the 19th century in southwestern New Hampshire, and the Fitzwilliam structure is believed to be the first of those to be built. Although it was built primarily as a church, it was converted to entirely secular uses in 1858, at which time the gallery level was converted into a full second story.

== See also ==
- National Register of Historic Places listings in Cheshire County, New Hampshire
