= Rhododendron State Park =

State park in Fitzwilliam, New Hampshire, United States

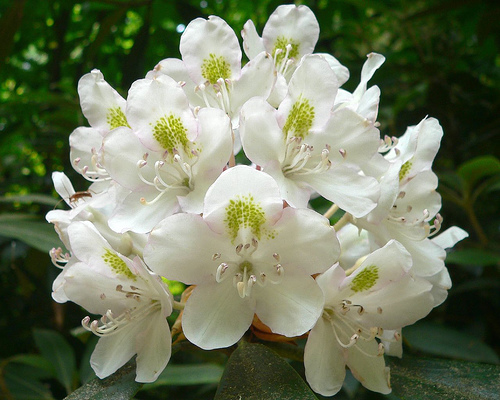
- Rhododendron maximum

- Location within New Hampshire
- Interactive map of Rhododendron State Park
- Location: Fitzwilliam, New Hampshire, United States
- Coordinates: 42°47′05″N 72°11′28″W
- Area: 2,723 acres (1,102 ha)
- Elevation: 1,191 feet (363 m)
- Established: 1947
- Administrator: New Hampshire Division of Parks and Recreation
- Website: Official website
- New Hampshire State Parks
- The Old Patch Place
- U.S. National Register of Historic Places
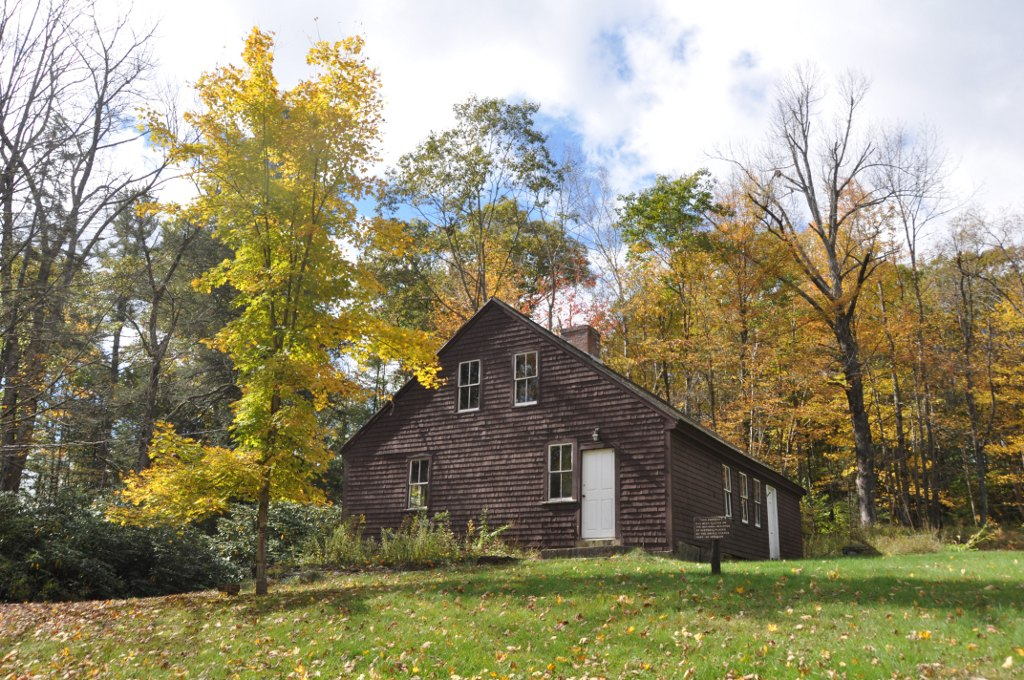
- Old Patch Place cottage
- Area: 294 acres (119 ha)
- Built: 1790–1816
- Architect: Captain Samuel Patch
- NRHP reference No.: 80000277
- Added to NRHP: August 15, 1980

Rhododendron State Park is a public recreation area and nature preserve occupying 2,723 acres (1,102 ha) on and around Little Monadnock Mountain in Fitzwilliam, New Hampshire, United States. The state park contains a 16-acre (6.5 ha) stand of native Rhododendron maximum, the largest of nineteen similar stands in central and northern New England, the northern limit of their growing range. The stand was designated a National Natural Landmark in 1982. The park also includes wild blueberries, cranberries, mountain laurel, heathers, mayflower, and wintergreen.

== History ==
In 1901-1902 Mary Lee Ware played a pivotal role in the creation of the park. In 1901, landowner Levi Fuller planned to "lumber off" the property and would have if not for Mary, who bought it in 1902. Giving it to the Appalachian Mountain Club (AMC) a year later, she signed the deal on the condition that the woodland "...be held as a reservation properly protected and open to the public..." The contract barred cutting down any trees or picking any rhododendron, a promise that has been broken only once due to the 1938 hurricane.

The donated land is called "Old Patch Place," remodeled by the AMC as a hostel/clubhouse but has since 1946 come under the protection of the N.H. Division of Parks and Recreation — the system's only designated botanical park. The Old Patch Place cottage near the park entrance was listed on the National Register of Historic Places in 1980.

== Activities and amenities ==
The rhododendrons bloom in mid-July. The park is open year-round. Hiking, picnicking, and snowshoeing are available. The Metacomet-Monadnock Trail passes through the state park on the way to the summit of Little Monadnock Mountain, which is outside the park limits.

== See also ==
- National Register of Historic Places listings in Cheshire County, New Hampshire
- List of National Natural Landmarks in New Hampshire

== Other reading ==
- Southern New Hampshire Trail Guide. The Appalachian Mountain Club, Boston, 1999.
- The Metacomet-Monadnock Trail Guide. 9th Edition. The Appalachian Mountain Club. Amherst, Massachusetts, 1999
