= Frank E. Riley =

American politician

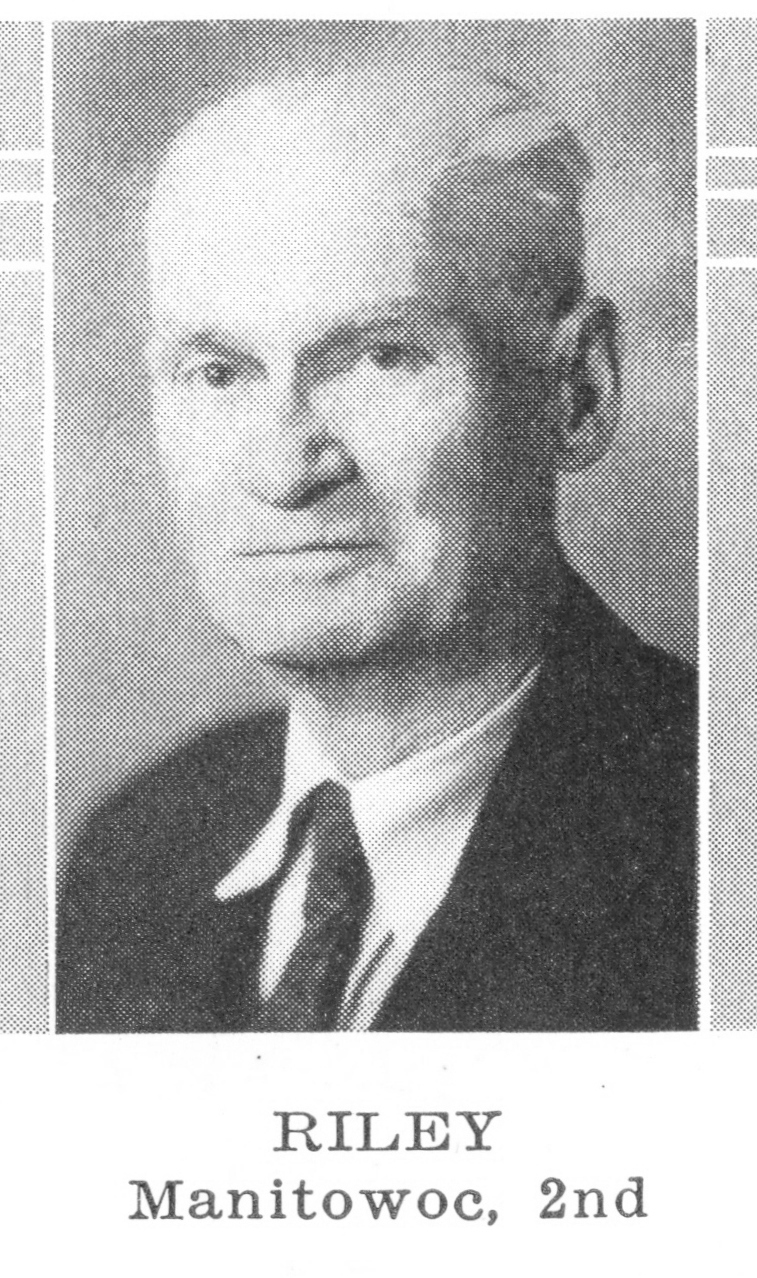
Frank E. Riley

Frank E. Riley was a member of the Wisconsin State Assembly.

== Biography ==
Riley was born on March 5, 1865, in Fitzwilliam, New Hampshire, and relocated to Two Rivers, Wisconsin, in 1868.

== Career ==
Riley was a member of the assembly from 1939 to 1946. Previously, he was postmaster and assessor of Two Rivers, as well as an alderman. He was a Republican.
