= Gap Mountain =

Mountain in New Hampshire, United States

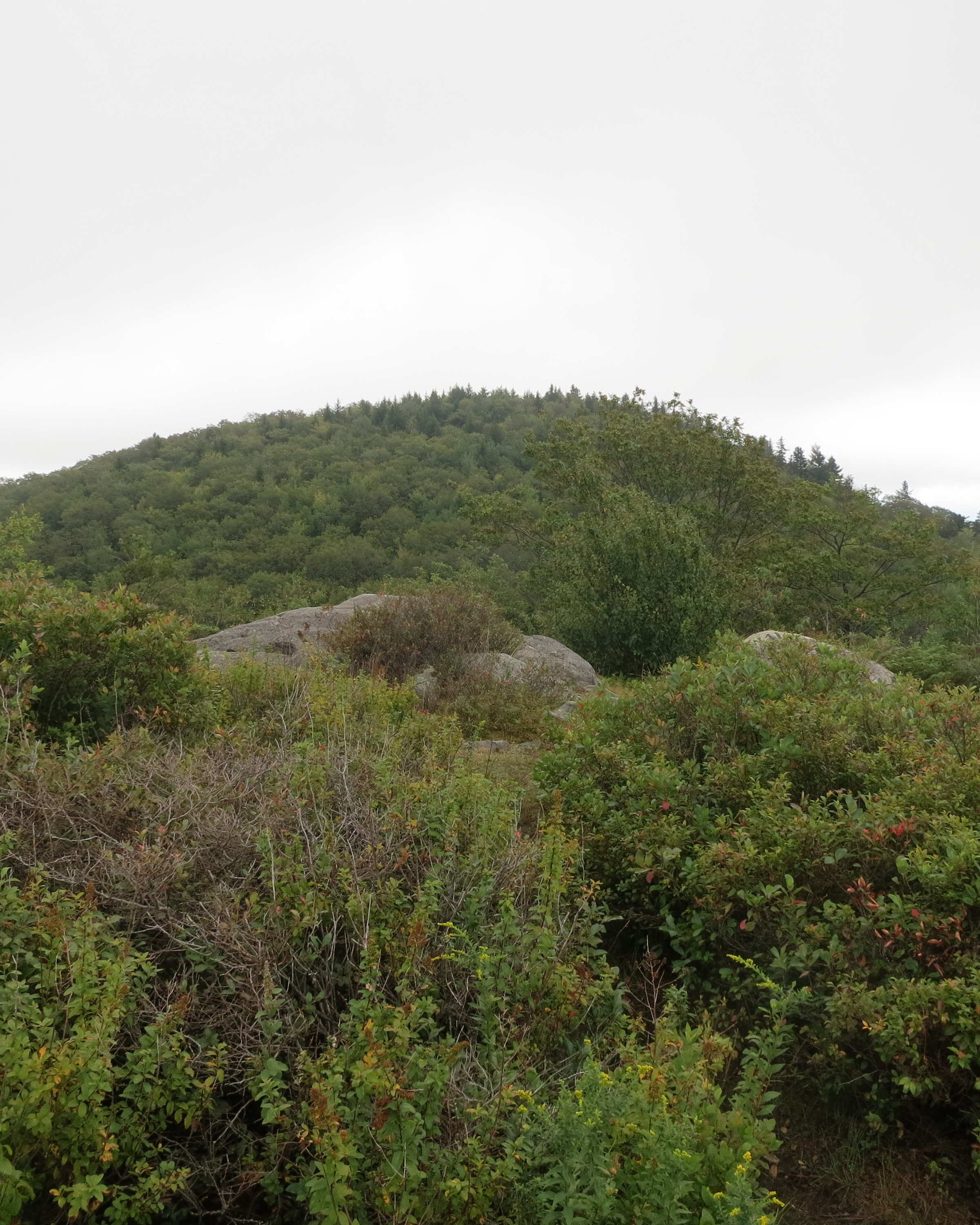
- Wooded south summit

Highest point
- Elevation: North peak 1,820 feet (555 m); Middle peak 1,840 feet (561 m); South peak 1,900 feet (579 m)
- Coordinates: 42°49′18″N 72°08′23″W (middle peak); 42°49′08″N 72°08′16″W (south peak)

Geography
- Location: Troy, New Hampshire
- Parent range: None; southern New Hampshire uplands

Geology
- Rock age: 400 million years
- Mountain type(s): monadnock; metamorphic rock

Climbing
- Easiest route: Metacomet-Monadnock Trail

Gap Mountain, located in Troy, New Hampshire, United States, is a small monadnock with three summits ranging between 1,820 feet (555 m) and 1,900 feet (579 m) above sea level. The lower north and middle summits are mostly bald and offer panoramic views of the surrounding rural landscape and of the higher and more popular Mount Monadnock. The Metacomet-Monadnock Trail passes over the north and middle peaks. The higher southern summit is wooded with no views. The mountain, located entirely within the Gap Mountain Reservation managed by the Society for the Protection of New Hampshire Forests, is named for the cleft separating the south peak from the north and middle summits.

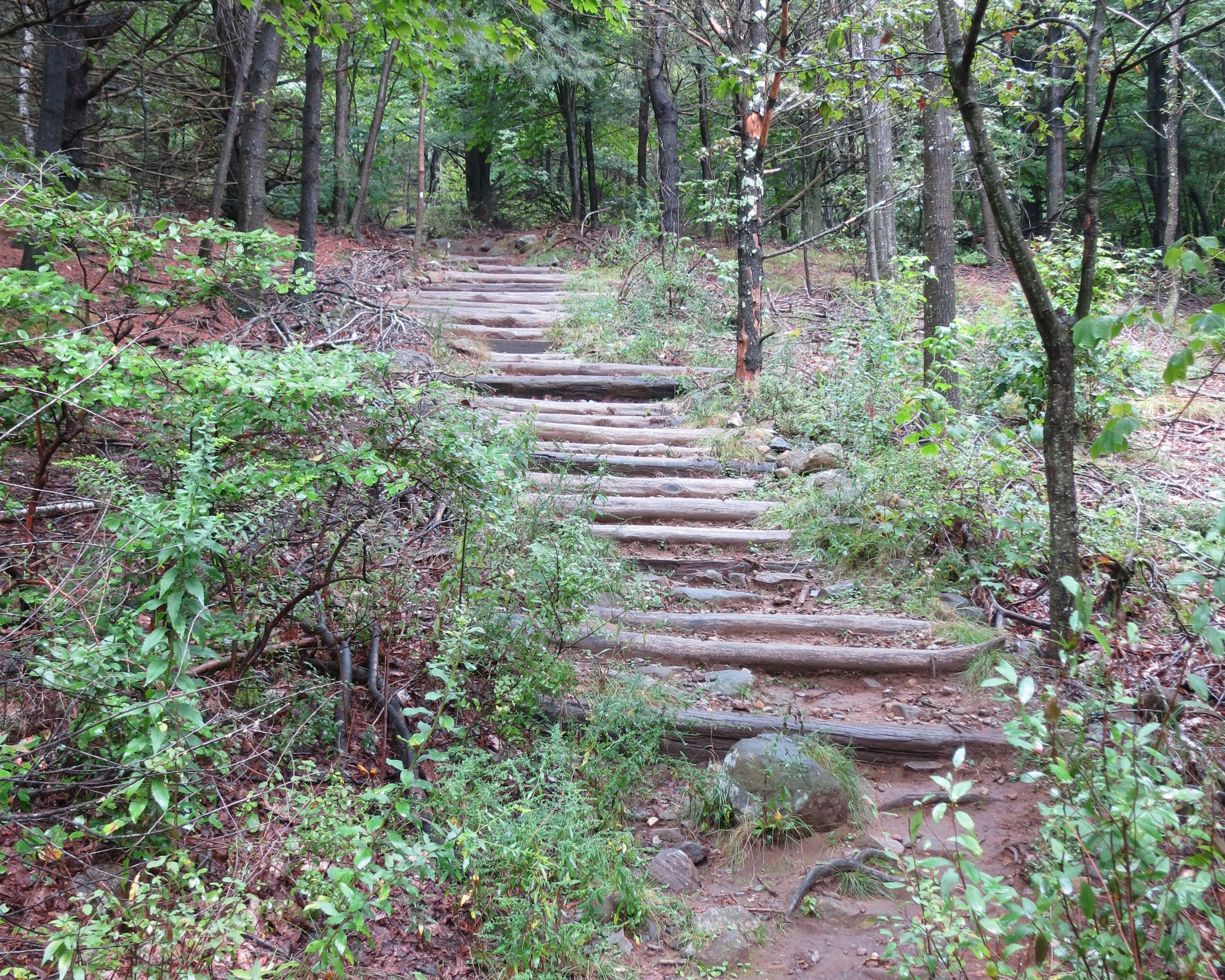
Metacomet-Monadnock Trail on Gap Mountain

The mountain is flanked by Mount Monadnock 3 miles (5 km) to the north and Little Monadnock Mountain 4 miles (6 km) to the southwest; the mountain's slopes drain to the east and south into the Millers River, thence into the Connecticut River to Long Island Sound. To the north and west, the slopes drain into the Ashuelot River, thence to the Connecticut River.

== History and conservation ==
Gap Mountain was cleared of timber in the 19th century and used for pasture for nearby dairy farmers. The summit was still open pasture as late as 1950 but has become progressively more wooded since. In the 1960s the mountain was put up for sale and passed hands several times; a housing development and a ski resort were proposed. Local citizens, concerned about the fate of the mountain, formed a coalition and, with the help of the Society for the Protection of New Hampshire Forests, began a twenty-year effort to purchase and conserve Gap Mountain and its environs. Several land donations completed the project, enlarging it to more than 1,100 acres (4.5 km^{2}). The mountain supports a variety of wildflower species unusual to New Hampshire. The north / middle summits of the mountain are still more or less bare and support extensive blueberry heath. The south summit is entirely wooded and no longer supports extensive views.

== Recreation ==
Hiking and blueberry picking are commonly enjoyed activities on the mountain. The Metacomet-Monadnock Trail, a 114-mile (183 km) trail which stretches from the Massachusetts/Connecticut border to Mount Monadnock, crosses the bald northern and middle summits. Two parking lots provide access to the trail. It is about 1.3 miles (2.1 km) from the south parking lot to the middle summit and about 1.2 miles (1.9 km) from the north parking lot to the north summit. The middle and north summits are about one tenth of a mile apart. The parking lots were constructed and are maintained by the Society for the Protection of New Hampshire Forests.
