= West Swanzey Covered Bridge =

- U.S. National Register of Historic Places
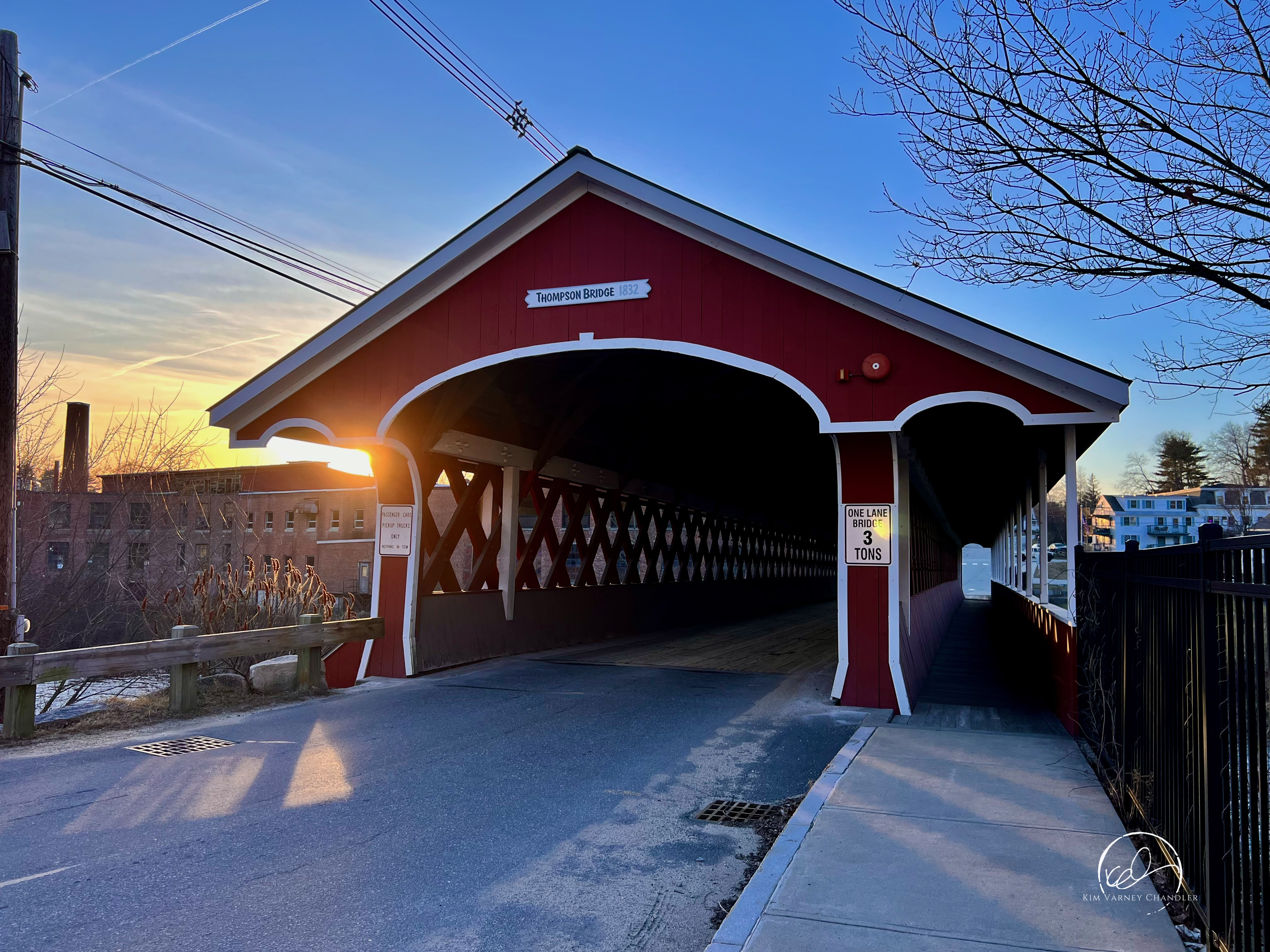
- West Swanzey Bridge, 2024

- Location within New Hampshire Location within the United States
- Location: Main St., West Swanzey, New Hampshire
- Coordinates: 42°52′19″N 72°19′41″W
- Area: 1 acre (0.40 ha)
- Built: 1832
- Architect: Taft, Zadoc
- Architectural style: Town truss
- NRHP reference No.: 80000281
- Added to NRHP: February 29, 1980

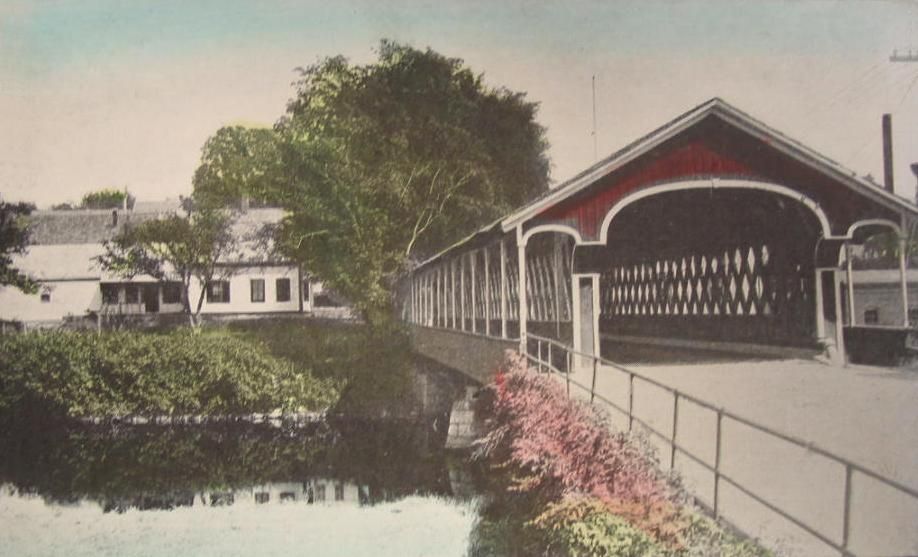
Postcard view c. 1915 showing both sidewalks

The West Swanzey Covered Bridge (also known as the Thompson Bridge) is a historic wooden covered bridge carrying Main Street over the Ashuelot River in West Swanzey, New Hampshire. Built in 1832, it is one of New Hampshire's few surviving 19th-century covered bridges. Unlike most of those, it is prominently located in the village, providing access from the village center to New Hampshire Route 10. The bridge was listed on the National Register of Historic Places in 1980.

== Description and history ==
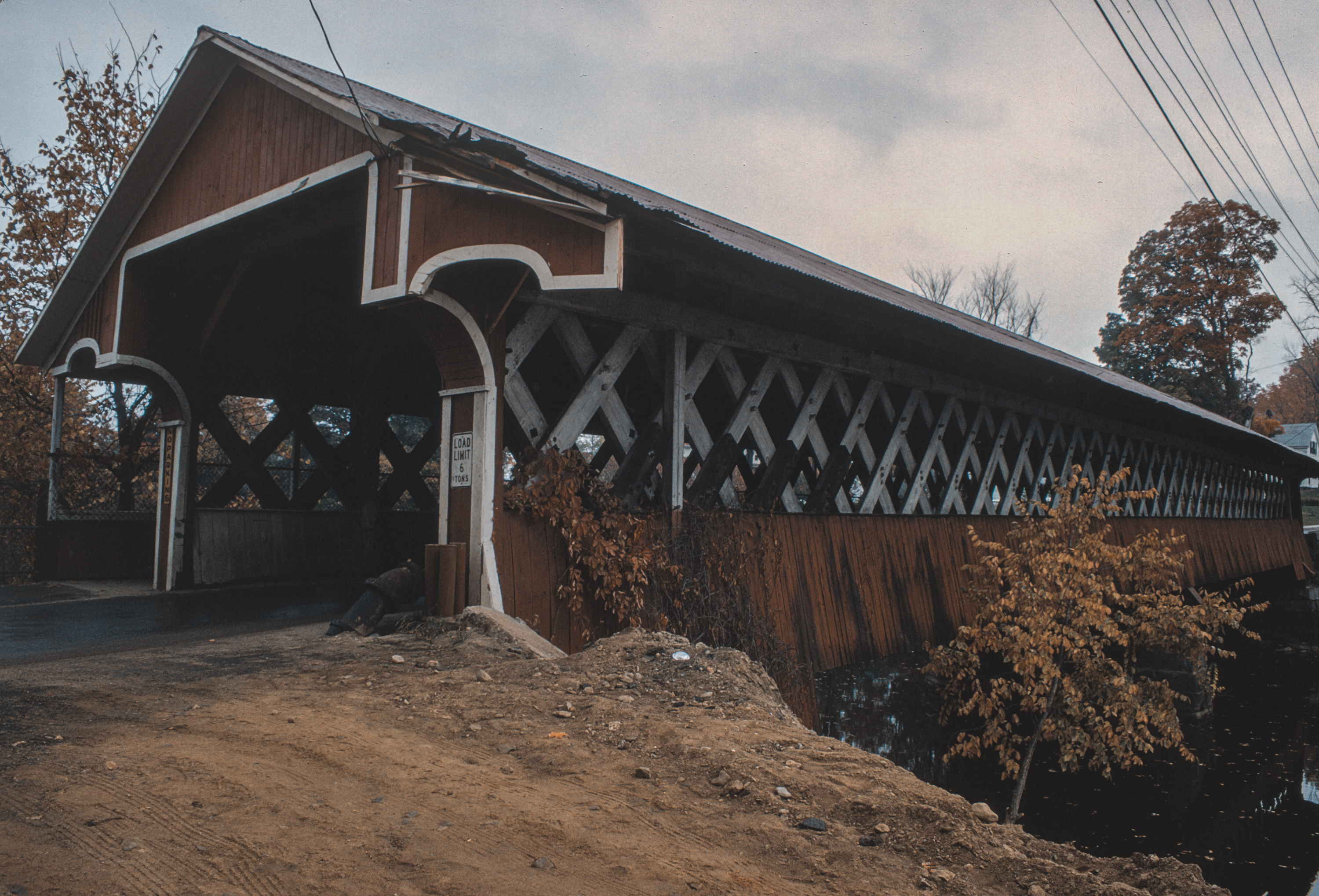
West Swanzey Bridge, showing one sidewalk, before restoration, 1966

The West Swanzey Covered Bridge is located just west of the village center of West Swanzey, carrying Main Street over the Ashuelot River in a roughly east–west orientation. It is one of two bridges in the village; the other is a modern one about 0.25 miles (0.40 km) downriver. It is a two-span Town lattice truss structure, 136'10" long, with spans measuring 64'0" and 63'6", and rests on a stone central pier and abutments. It is covered by a shallow-pitch metal gabled roof, which extends beyond the trusses to shelter sidewalks on both sides. Only one of the sidewalks now survives, although evidence of the separate walkway portals survives. The main vehicle portals have segmented-arch tops, which are echoed in the pedestrian portals.

The bridge was built in 1832 by Zadoc Taft for the town at a cost of $523.27. In 1973 the bridge was posted for a six-ton limit, requiring school buses to empty before they could cross the bridge. It was closed to all traffic in 1990, and underwent a major reconstruction in 1993.

Some notoriety came to the Thompson Bridge in 1930. Henry Ford, founder of the Ford Motor Company, attempted to purchase the bridge and relocate it to his Greenfield Village Museum in Dearborn, Michigan. However, the town selectmen refused to sell the landmark. Ford later purchased Pennsylvania's Ackley Covered Bridge instead. The bridge was repainted in 2023.

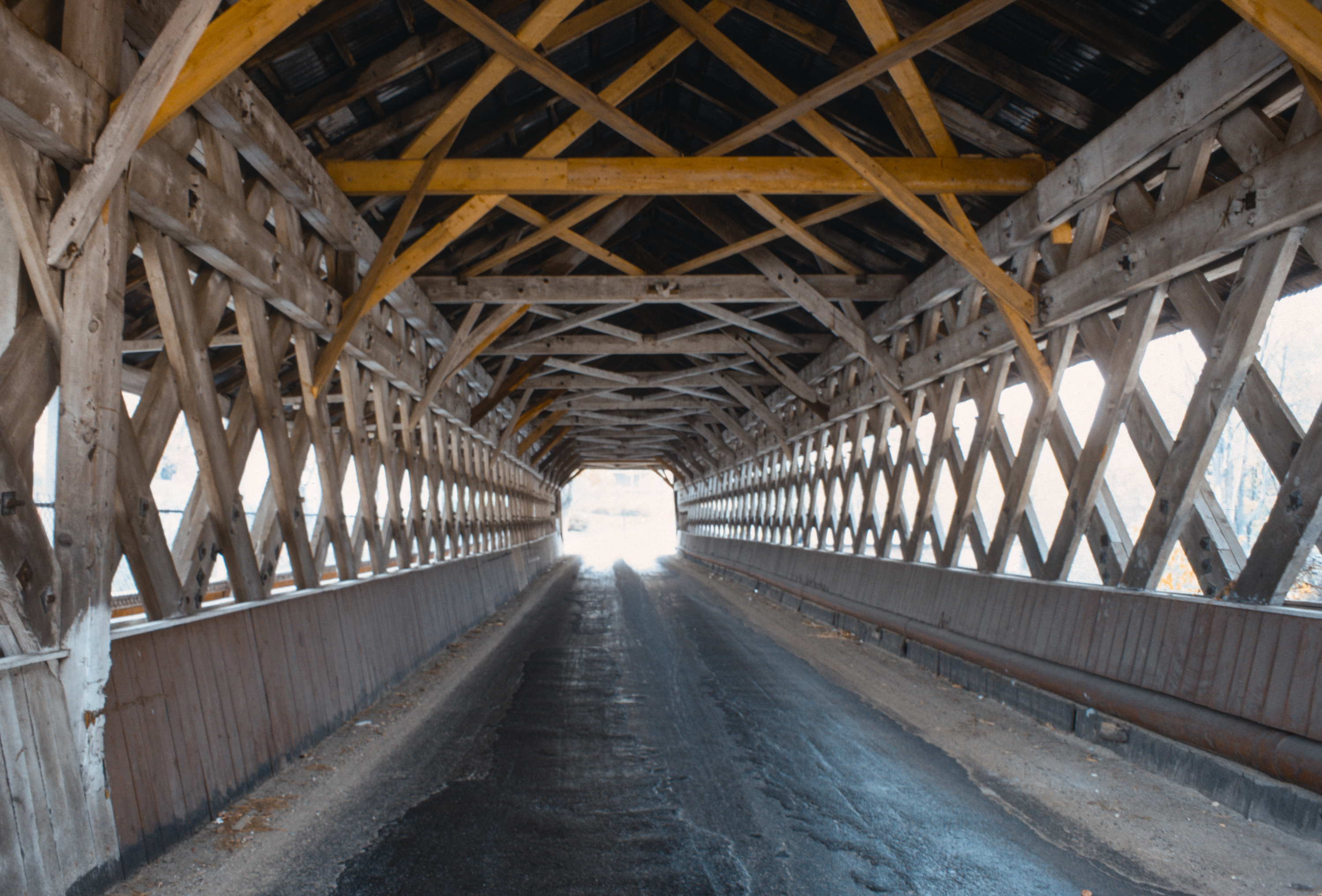
West Swanzey Bridge, Inside, before restoration, 1966

== See also ==
- List of New Hampshire covered bridges
- List of bridges on the National Register of Historic Places in New Hampshire
- National Register of Historic Places listings in Cheshire County, New Hampshire
