= West Swanzey, New Hampshire =

Census-designated place in New Hampshire, United States

- Census-designated place
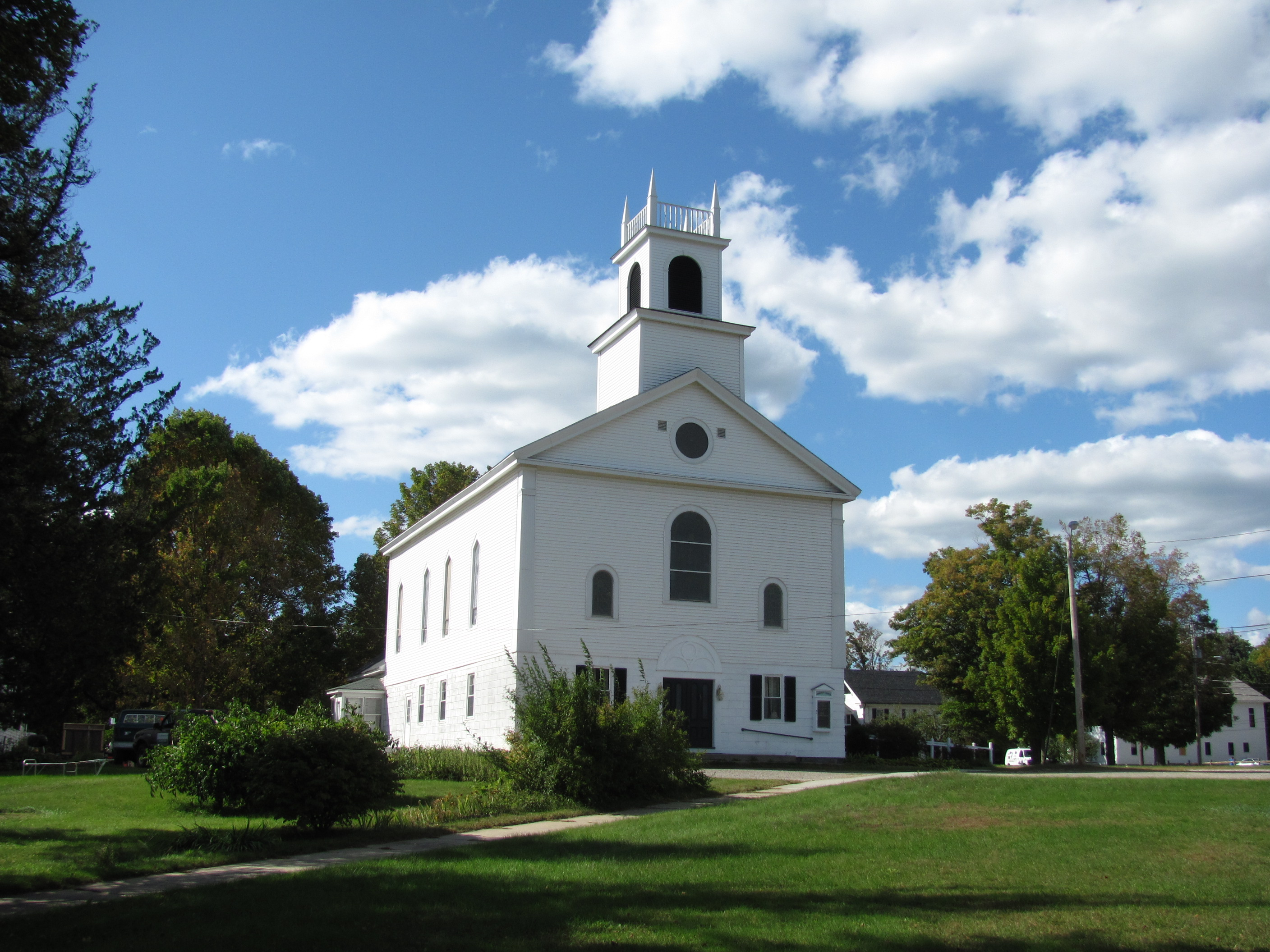
- Baptist Church at the village center

- Location within New Hampshire Location within the United States
- Coordinates: 42°52′15″N 72°19′21″W
- Country: United States
- State: New Hampshire
- County: Cheshire
- Town: Swanzey

Area
  - Total: 2.60 sq mi (6.73 km^{2})
  - Land: 2.58 sq mi (6.68 km^{2})
  - Water: 0.019 sq mi (0.05 km^{2})
- Elevation: 492 ft (150 m)

Population (2020)
  - Total: 1,281
  - Density: 496.5/sq mi (191.69/km^{2})
- Time zone: UTC-5 (Eastern (EST))
  - Summer (DST): UTC-4 (EDT)
- ZIP code: 03469
- Area code: 603
- FIPS code: 33-83700
- GNIS feature ID: 2378094

West Swanzey is a census-designated place (CDP) in the town of Swanzey within Cheshire County, New Hampshire, United States. The population was 1,281 at the 2020 census. It is the largest village in the town of Swanzey.

== Geography ==
West Swanzey is located in the west-central part of the town of Swanzey, on both sides of the Ashuelot River. The West Swanzey Covered Bridge carries Main Street across the river in the center of the village. New Hampshire Route 10 passes through the west side of the village, leading north 6 miles (10 km) to Keene and south 7 miles (11 km) to Winchester.

According to the U.S. Census Bureau, the West Swanzey CDP has a total area of 2.60 square miles (6.73 km^{2}), of which 2.58 square miles (6.68 km^{2}) are land and 0.02 square miles (0.05 km^{2}), or 0.70%, are water.

== Demographics ==
Historical population
Census	Pop.	Note	%±
1980	1,022		—
1990	1,055		3.2%
2000	1,118		6.0%
2010	1,308		17.0%
2020	1,281		−2.1%
U.S. Decennial Census

As of the census of 2010, there were 1,308 people, 581 households, and 340 families residing in the CDP. There were 617 housing units, of which 36, or 5.8%, were vacant. The racial makeup of the CDP was 93.2% white, 0.8% African American, 0.2% Native American, 4.4% Asian, 0.0% Native Hawaiian or Pacific Islander, 0.2% some other race, and 1.2% two or more races. 1.2% of the population were Hispanic or Latino of any race.

Of the 581 households in the CDP, 29.1% had children under the age of 18 living with them, 39.4% were headed by married couples living together, 13.3% had a female householder with no husband present, and 41.5% were non-families. 30.3% of all households were made up of individuals, and 10.2% were someone living alone who was 65 years of age or older. The average household size was 2.25, and the average family size was 2.83.

21.5% of residents in the CDP were under the age of 18, 8.9% were from age 18 to 24, 28.3% were from 25 to 44, 26.6% were from 45 to 64, and 14.6% were 65 years of age or older. The median age was 37.9 years. For every 100 females, there were 86.1 males. For every 100 females age 18 and over, there were 86.1 males.

For the period 2011–15, the estimated median annual income for a household was $38,856. Male full-time workers had a median income of 29,524 versus $27,738 for females. The per capita income for the CDP was $23,011. 40.2% of the population and 39.1% of families were below the poverty line, along with 83.1% of people under the age of 18 and 13.5% of people 65 or older.
