= South Branch Ashuelot River =

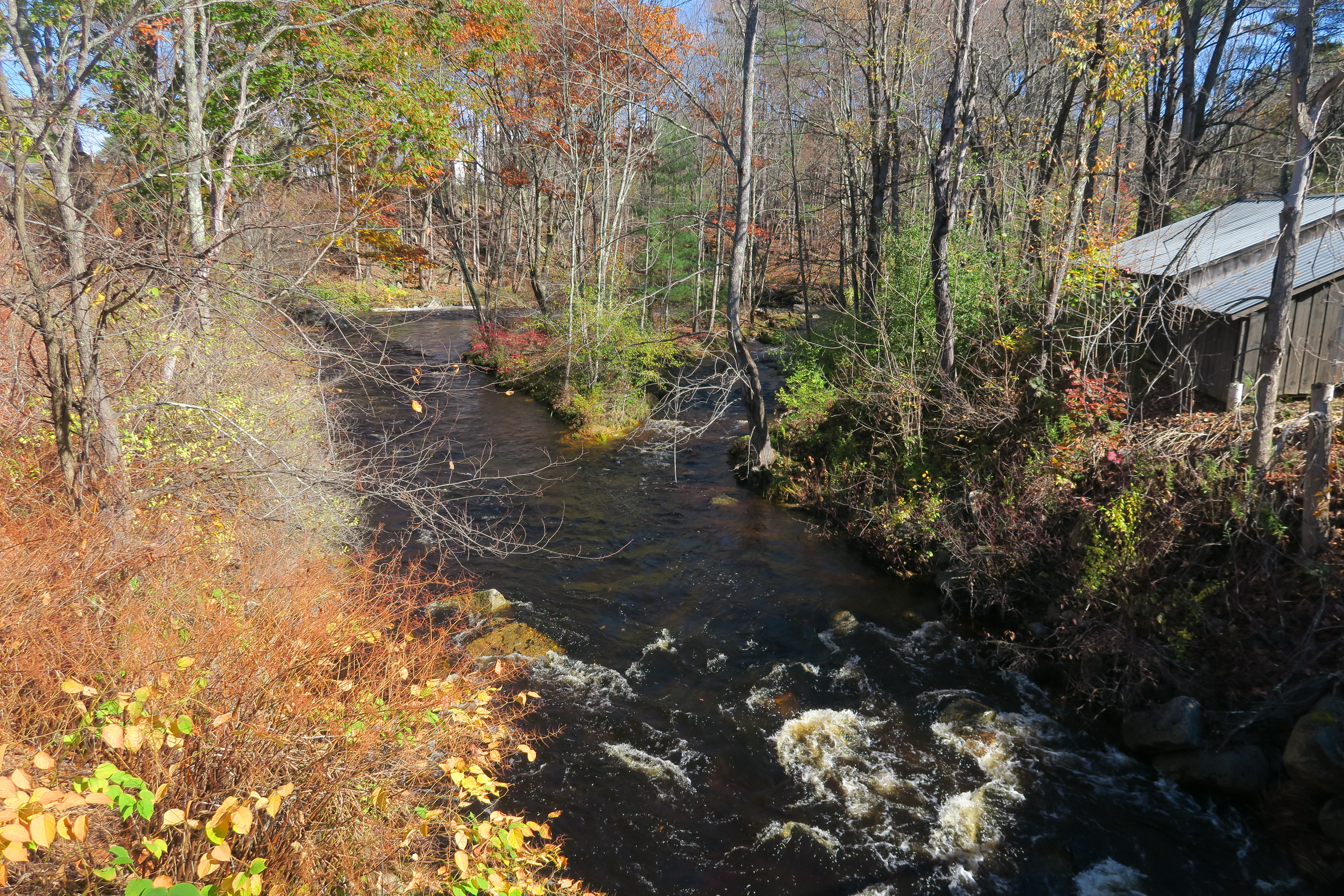
- The South Branch in East Swanzey

- Location within New Hampshire Location within the United States

Location
- Country: United States
- State: New Hampshire
- County: Cheshire
- Towns: Troy, Marlborough, Swanzey

Physical characteristics
- Source: Confluence of Rockwood Brook and Quarry Brook
  - location: Troy
  - coordinates: 42°49′39″N 72°10′42″W
  - elevation: 955 ft (291 m)
- Mouth: Ashuelot River
  - location: Swanzey
  - coordinates: 42°53′21″N 72°16′57″W
  - elevation: 463 ft (141 m)
- Length: 17.4 mi (28.0 km)

Basin features
- Tributaries
  - left: Bridge Brook, Martin Brook
  - right: Shaker Brook, Forbush Brook

The South Branch of the Ashuelot River is a 17.4-mile-long (28.0 km) river located in southwestern New Hampshire in the United States. It is a tributary of the Ashuelot River, itself a tributary of the Connecticut River, which flows to Long Island Sound.

The South Branch begins in the town of Troy, New Hampshire, at the confluence of Rockwood Brook and Quarry Brook. The river flows in a zigzag manner northwest, then southwest, then north to the Ashuelot River in Swanzey. On the river's northwest-flowing leg, it drops rapidly as it cuts a deep, narrow valley through the highlands of Troy and Marlborough. New Hampshire Route 12 and an abandoned railroad line follow the river along this section. When the river turns southwest, the valley widens, except for a brief section where the river passes the village of East Swanzey. The final, north-flowing leg of the river is through a broad, flat intervale, where the river makes numerous tight meanders.

== See also ==
- List of rivers of New Hampshire
