= Swanzey, New Hampshire =

- Town
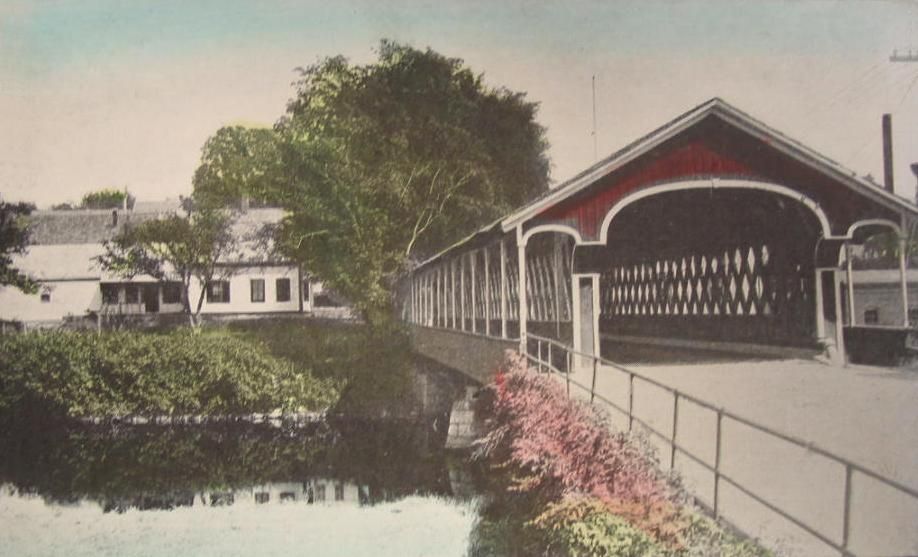
- West Swanzey Covered Bridge c. 1915

- Seal
- Motto: "Bridging Tradition and Change"
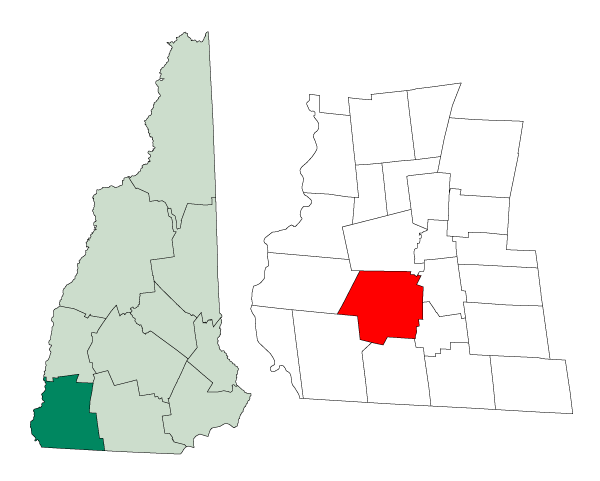
- Location in Cheshire County, New Hampshire
- Coordinates: 42°51′24″N 72°17′26″W
- Country: United States
- State: New Hampshire
- County: Cheshire
- Incorporated: 1753
- Villages: Swanzey; East Swanzey; North Swanzey; West Swanzey; Westport

Area
  - Total: 45.3 sq mi (117.4 km^{2})
  - Land: 45.0 sq mi (116.5 km^{2})
  - Water: 0.35 sq mi (0.9 km^{2}) 0.79%
- Elevation: 610 ft (190 m)

Population (2020)
  - Total: 7,270
  - Density: 162/sq mi (62.4/km^{2})
- Time zone: UTC−5 (Eastern)
  - Summer (DST): UTC−4 (Eastern)
- ZIP Codes: 03446: Swanzey; 03431: Keene/North Swanzey; 03469: West Swanzey
- Area code: 603
- FIPS code: 33-75700
- GNIS feature ID: 873735
- Website: www.swanzeynh.gov

Swanzey is a town in Cheshire County, New Hampshire, United States. The population was 7,270 at the 2020 census, and an estimated 7,461 in 2025. In addition to the town center, Swanzey includes the villages of East Swanzey, West Swanzey, North Swanzey and Westport.

== History ==
First granted in 1733 as "Lower Ashuelot", Swanzey was one of the fort towns established by Governor Jonathan Belcher of Massachusetts, which then claimed the territory. The town was the site of many battles during King George's War, and in 1747 it was abandoned for three years. It was regranted to 62 proprietors on July 2, 1753, by Governor Benning Wentworth as "Swanzey", most probably because some early settlers had a connection to Swansea in Wales. Situated on the Ashuelot River and connected by the Ashuelot Railroad, West Swanzey developed as a textile mill town, and East Swanzey produced wooden buckets for generations. By 1859, the population was 2,106.

The town features four covered bridges, and was the home of theatrical trouper Denman Thompson, who gained a national reputation by his portrayal of the Yankee farmer, "Joshua Whitcomb", star of his stage play The Old Homestead. Residents restage Thompson's melodrama every summer at a natural outdoor amphitheater called the Potash Bowl.

Because he vacationed in Swanzey during several summers, the town has claimed to be the location of a tree that inspired poet Joyce Kilmer (1886–1918) to write the popular 1913 poem "Trees". However, family accounts and documents establish that the poem was written in Mahwah, New Jersey.

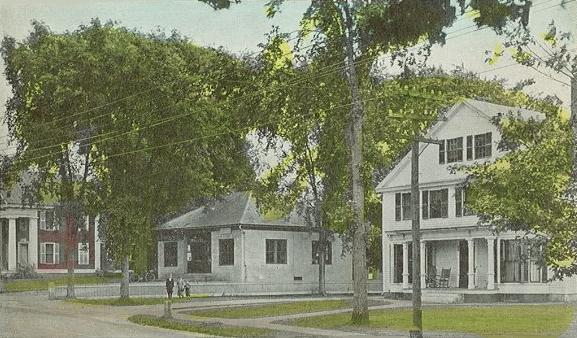
Post Office c. 1915

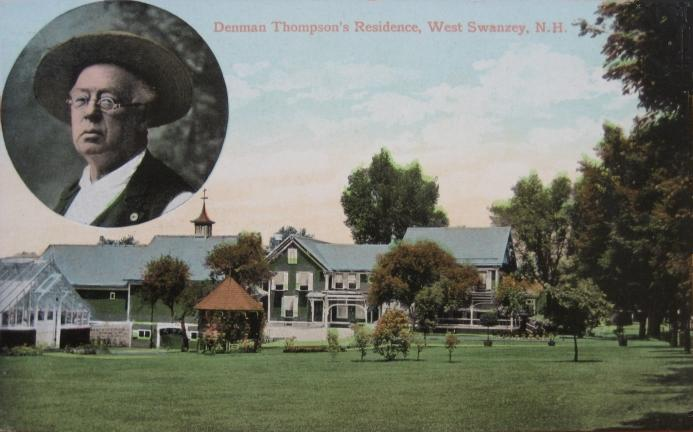
Denman Thompson's residence in 1907

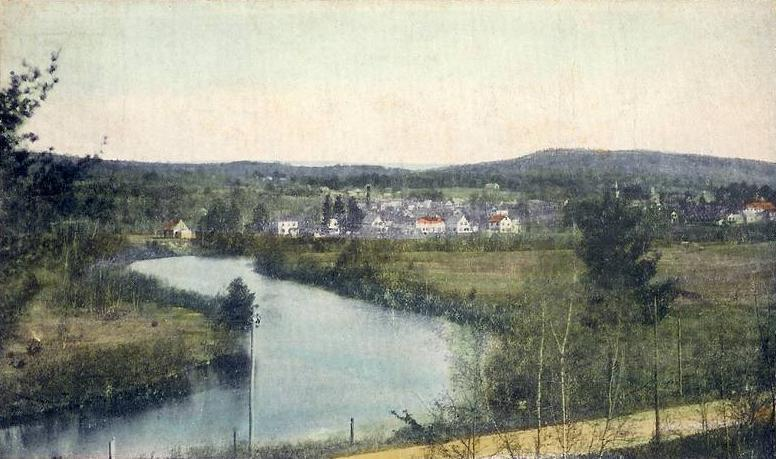
Ashuelot River c. 1915

== Geography ==
According to the United States Census Bureau, the town has a total area of 45.3 square miles (117.4 km^{2}), of which 45.0 square miles (116.5 km^{2}) are land and 0.35 square miles (0.9 km^{2}) are water, comprising 0.79% of the town. Swanzey is drained by the Ashuelot River, a southwest-flowing tributary of the Connecticut River. The town's highest point is the summit of Franklin Mountain at 1,423 feet (434 m), on the border with Winchester.

The town is crossed by New Hampshire Route 10, New Hampshire Route 12 and New Hampshire Route 32.

== Demographics ==
Historical population
Census	Pop.	Note	%±
1790	1,157		—
1800	1,271		9.9%
1810	1,400		10.1%
1820	1,716		22.6%
1830	1,816		5.8%
1840	1,755		−3.4%
1850	2,106		20.0%
1860	1,798		−14.6%
1870	1,626		−9.6%
1880	1,661		2.2%
1890	1,600		−3.7%
1900	1,570		−1.9%
1910	1,656		5.5%
1920	1,593		−3.8%
1930	2,066		29.7%
1940	2,262		9.5%
1950	2,806		24.0%
1960	3,626		29.2%
1970	4,254		17.3%
1980	5,183		21.8%
1990	6,236		20.3%
2000	6,800		9.0%
2010	7,230		6.3%
2020	7,270		0.6%
2024 (est.)	7,463		2.7%
U.S. Decennial Census

As of the census of 2010, there were 7,230 people, 2,957 households, and 1,978 families residing in the town. There were 3,205 housing units, of which 248, or 7.7%, were vacant. The racial makeup of the town was 96.0% white, 0.3% African American, 0.2% Native American, 1.7% Asian, 0.03% Native Hawaiian or Pacific Islander, 0.4% some other race, and 1.4% from two or more races. 1.5% of the population were Hispanic or Latino of any race.

Of the 2,957 households, 28.0% had children under the age of 18 living with them, 51.0% were headed by married couples living together, 10.5% had a female householder with no husband present, and 33.1% were non-families. Of all households, 24.0% were made up of individuals, and 9.1% were someone living alone who was 65 years of age or older. The average household size was 2.45, and the average family size was 2.88.

In the town, 20.4% of the population were under the age of 18, 7.9% were from 18 to 24, 24.6% from 25 to 44, 32.2% from 45 to 64, and 14.8% were 65 years of age or older. The median age was 43.0 years. For every 100 females, there were 94.8 males. For every 100 females age 18 and over, there were 94.4 males.

For the period 2011–2015, the estimated median annual income for a household was $57,632, and the median income for a family was $68,371. Male full-time workers had a median income of $50,017 versus $42,778 for females. The per capita income for the town was $33,749. 14.2% of the population and 10.5% of families were below the poverty line. 39.0% of the population under the age of 18 and 4.9% of those 65 or older were living in poverty.

== Education ==
- Monadnock Regional High School

== Sites of interest ==
- Swanzey Historical Museum
- West Swanzey Covered Bridge, built in 1832

== Notable people ==
- Loyal B. Stearns (1853–1936), jurist, Oregon state representative
- Denman Thompson (1833–1911), playwright, theatre actor
