= Fitzwilliam, New Hampshire =

- Town
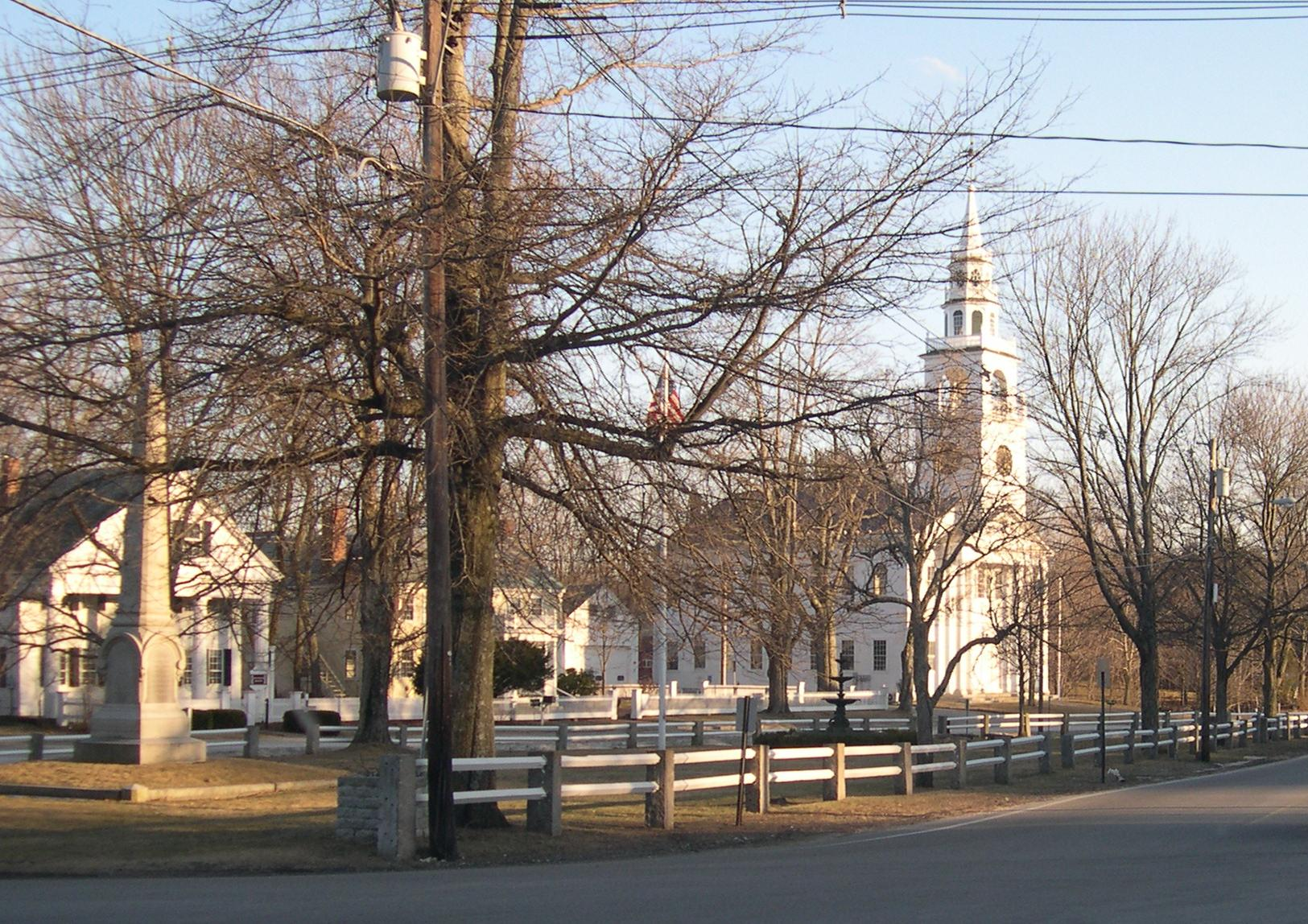
- Meeting House and Common

- Coat of Arms

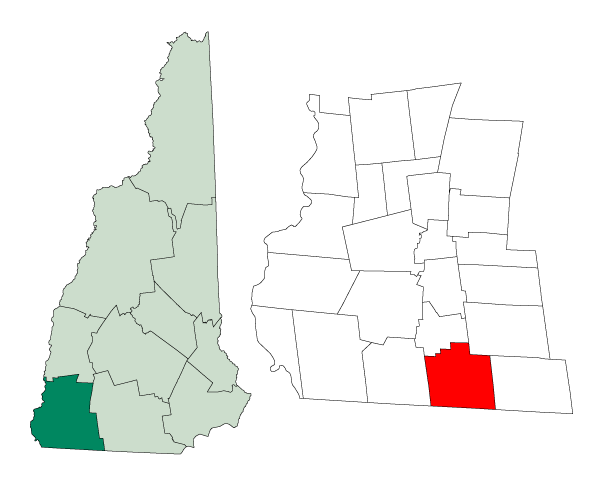
- Location in Cheshire County, New Hampshire
- Coordinates: 42°45′10″N 72°08′30″W
- Country: United States
- State: New Hampshire
- County: Cheshire
- Incorporated: 1773
- Villages: Fitzwilliam; Fitzwilliam Depot; Bowkerville

Area
  - Total: 36.0 sq mi (93.3 km^{2})
  - Land: 34.6 sq mi (89.7 km^{2})
  - Water: 1.4 sq mi (3.6 km^{2}) 3.88%
- Elevation: 1,142 ft (348 m)

Population (2020)
  - Total: 2,351
  - Density: 67.9/sq mi (26.2/km^{2})
- Time zone: UTC-5 (Eastern)
  - Summer (DST): UTC-4 (Eastern)
- ZIP code: 03447
- Area code: 603
- FIPS code: 33-26500
- GNIS feature ID: 873597
- Website: www.fitzwilliam-nh.gov

Fitzwilliam is a town in Cheshire County, New Hampshire, United States. The population was 2,351 at the 2020 census, and an estimated 2,500 in 2025. Fitzwilliam is home to Rhododendron State Park, a 16-acre (6.5 ha) grove of native rhododendrons that bloom in mid-July.

== History ==
First granted as "Monadnock No. 4" in 1752 by colonial Governor Benning Wentworth, this was one in a line of eight towns settled by Scottish colonists. Incorporated in 1773 by Governor John Wentworth, the town was named for his cousin, William Fitzwilliam, 4th Earl Fitzwilliam. Two early grantees in Fitzwilliam were Matthew Thornton, signer of the Declaration of Independence, and James Reed, who would lead the 3rd New Hampshire Regiment at Bunker Hill.

The community claims one of the oldest granite quarries in New Hampshire. Other industries included wood-working and yarn-making. The railroad entered in 1848.

Fitzwilliam's picturesque common, together with twelve antique houses that surround it, are listed on the National Register of Historic Places.

== Geography ==
According to the United States Census Bureau, the town has a total area of 36.0 square miles (93.3 km^{2}), of which 34.6 square miles (89.7 km^{2}) are land and 1.4 square miles (3.6 km^{2}) are water, comprising 3.88% of the town. Little Monadnock Mountain, elevation 1,883 feet (574 m), is the highest point in Fitzwilliam, located in the western part of town. The Metacomet-Monadnock Trail traverses the summit, as does a shorter side trail from Rhododendron State Park. The town is drained by the South Branch of the Ashuelot River, the source of which is Bowker Pond. Fitzwilliam lies fully within the Connecticut River watershed.

The town is served by state routes 12 and 119.

=== Adjacent municipalities ===
- Troy (north)
- Jaffrey (northeast)
- Rindge (east)
- Winchendon, Massachusetts (southeast)
- Royalston, Massachusetts (south)
- Richmond (west)

== Demographics ==
Historical population
Census	Pop.	Note	%±
1790	1,038		—
1800	1,240		19.5%
1810	1,301		4.9%
1820	1,167		−10.3%
1830	1,229		5.3%
1840	1,366		11.1%
1850	1,482		8.5%
1860	1,294		−12.7%
1870	1,140		−11.9%
1880	1,187		4.1%
1890	1,122		−5.5%
1900	987		−12.0%
1910	1,148		16.3%
1920	962		−16.2%
1930	850		−11.6%
1940	824		−3.1%
1950	872		5.8%
1960	966		10.8%
1970	1,362		41.0%
1980	1,795		31.8%
1990	2,011		12.0%
2000	2,141		6.5%
2010	2,396		11.9%
2020	2,351		−1.9%
2024 (est.)	2,483		5.6%
U.S. Decennial Census

As of the census of 2000, there were 2,141 people, 836 households, and 586 families residing in the town. The population density was 61.8 inhabitants per square mile (23.9/km^{2}). There were 1,074 housing units at an average density of 31.0 per square mile (12.0/km^{2}). The racial makeup of the town was 97.52% White, 0.37% African American, 0.33% Native American, 0.19% Asian, 0.19% Pacific Islander, 0.05% from other races, and 1.35% from two or more races. Hispanic or Latino of any race were 0.75% of the population. 17.5% were of French, 16.6% English, 10.5% American, 10.5% Irish, 6.4% Italian, 6.0% Finnish, 6.0% German and 5.6% French Canadian ancestry according to Census 2000.

There were 836 households, out of which 32.7% had children under the age of 18 living with them, 58.7% were married couples living together, 7.7% had a female householder with no husband present, and 29.9% were non-families. 22.4% of all households were made up of individuals, and 7.4% had someone living alone who was 65 years of age or older. The average household size was 2.56 and the average family size was 3.02.

In the town, the population was spread out, with 24.3% under the age of 18, 7.0% from 18 to 24, 28.2% from 25 to 44, 29.8% from 45 to 64, and 10.8% who were 65 years of age or older. The median age was 40 years. For every 100 females, there were 103.3 males. For every 100 females age 18 and over, there were 104.0 males.

The median income for a household in the town was $48,125, and the median income for a family was $55,476. Males had a median income of $35,474 versus $29,130 for females. The per capita income for the town was $23,127. About 3.3% of families and 6.7% of the population were below the poverty line, including 9.2% of those under age 18 and 4.4% of those age 65 or over.

== Education ==
Residents of Fitzwilliam attending public high school go to Monadnock Regional High School in Swanzey. Elementary school students attend Emerson Elementary School.

== Sites of interest ==
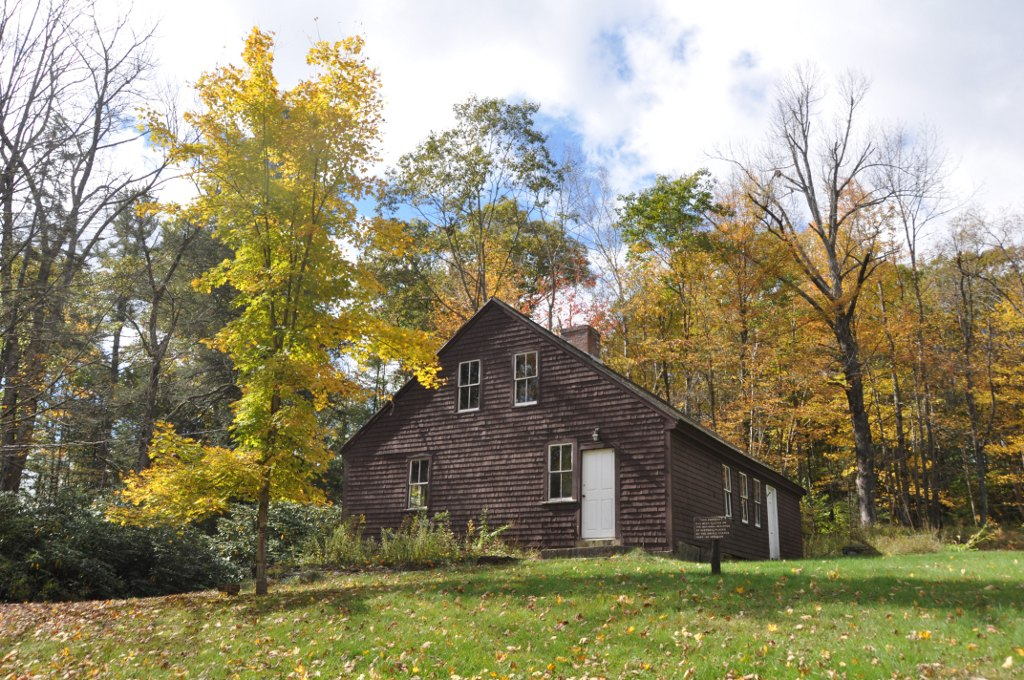
Old Patch Place

- Amos J. Blake House (1837) — Fitzwilliam Historical Society]
- Rhododendron State Park

Entries on the National Register of Historic Places

- Fitzwilliam Common Historic District — Jct. of NH 119, Richmond Rd., and Templeton Hwy. (added June 2, 1997)
- Old Patch Place — Rhododendron Road at the entrance to Rhododendron State Park (added September 15, 1980)
- Third Fitzwilliam Meetinghouse — Village Green (added September 26, 1977)

== Notable people ==
- Joseph Lee Heywood (1837–1876), treasurer
- Nahum Parker (1760–1839), U.S. senator
- Elijah Phillips (1809–1832), early settler of Illinois
- Edward C. Reed (1793–1883), US congressman from New York
- James Reed (c. 1722–1807), Revolutionary era brigadier-general
- Frank E. Riley (1865–?), Wisconsin state assemblyman
- Harry Dexter White (1892–1948), economist, senior US Treasury department official
