= Massachusetts Route 49 =

State highway in Worcester County, Massachusetts, US

Route 49
- Podunk Pike

Route information
- Maintained by MassDOT
- Length: 7.44 mi (11.97 km)
- Existed: 1972–present

Major junctions
- South end: US 20 in Sturbridge
- North end: Route 9 in Spencer

Location
- Country: United States
- State: Massachusetts
- Counties: Worcester

Highway system
- Massachusetts State Highway System; Interstate; US; State
← Route 47	→ Route 52

Route 49 is a two-lane expressway in the U.S. state of Massachusetts. Known as Podunk Pike, the highway runs 7.44 miles (11.97 km) from U.S. Route 20 (US 20) in Sturbridge north to Route 9 in Spencer. Route 49 provides a connection between US 20 and Route 9 in southwestern Worcester County.

== Route description ==
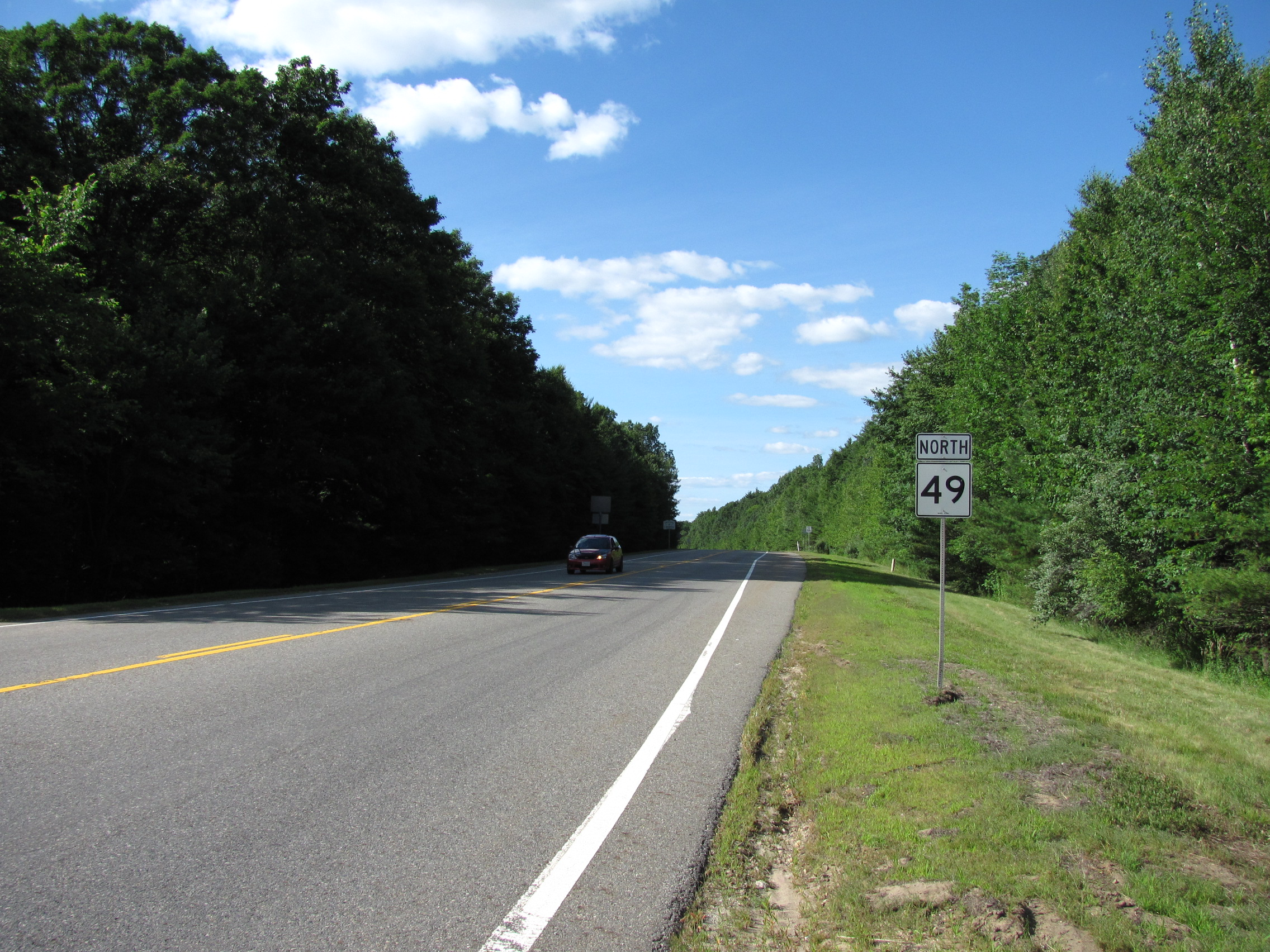
Northbound Route 49 entering East Brookfield from Sturbridge

Route 49 begins at US 20 (Charlton Road) in the town of Sturbridge. The route heads north as a two-lane expressway with a speed limit of 55 miles per hour (89 km/h). Route 49 crosses over Interstate 90 (Massachusetts Turnpike) with no interchange as it clips the northwest corner of the town of Charlton. The highway parallels Podunk Road for most of its course as it passes to the east of Wells State Park and enters the town of East Brookfield. Route 49 enters the town of Spencer, crosses over CSX's Boston Subdivision rail line, and crosses over the Sevenmile River before it reaches its northern terminus at Route 9 (Main Street).

== Major intersections ==
The entire route is in Worcester County.

Location	mi	km	Destinations	Notes
Sturbridge	0.00	0.00	US 20 to I-84 / Route 131 – Auburn, Springfield	Southern terminus
Spencer	7.44	11.97	Route 9 – Brookfield, Spencer	Northern terminus
1.000 mi = 1.609 km; 1.000 km = 0.621 mi
