= Massachusetts Route 67 =

State highway in Massachusetts, US

Route 67
- Route 67 highlighted in red

Route information
- Maintained by MassDOT
- Length: 24.81 mi (39.93 km)
- Existed: 1933–present

Major junctions
- South end: US 20 in Palmer
- Route 19 in Warren; Route 9 in West Brookfield; Route 148 in North Brookfield
- North end: Route 32 in Barre

Location
- Country: United States
- State: Massachusetts
- Counties: Hampden, Worcester

Highway system
- Massachusetts State Highway System; Interstate; US; State
← Route 66	→ Route 68

Route 67 is a 24.81-mile-long (39.93 km) north–south (though geographically more northeast–southwest) highway in western and central Massachusetts. Its southern terminus is at U.S. Route 20 (US 20) in Palmer and its northern terminus is at Route 32 in Barre.

== Route description ==
Route 67 begins at U.S. Route 20 in Palmer near the Palmer/Monson town line. The highway runs north and east along the Quaboag River and under Interstate 90/Mass Pike, without an intersection. Route 67 becomes concurrent with Route 19 in the center of Warren, running in a northeasterly direction for approximately three miles. At the intersection with Route 9 in West Brookfield along the southern shore of Wickaboag Pond, Route 19 ends and Route 67 turns east, running concurrent with Route 9 for approximately one mile to the center of West Brookfield. Route 67 then runs in a northeasterly direction into North Brookfield and becomes concurrent with Route 148 for about one mile (1.6 km) to the center of North Brookfield. After the concurrency ends, Route 67 goes through New Braintree and ends at Route 32 in Barre.

== History ==
In 1930, the section of Route 67 from U.S. Route 20 to Route 9 was part of US 20. By 1933, that section was unnumbered and Route 67 had been assigned to the road from East Brookfield to Barre. By 1939, Route 67 was shifted to its current routing.

== Major intersections ==
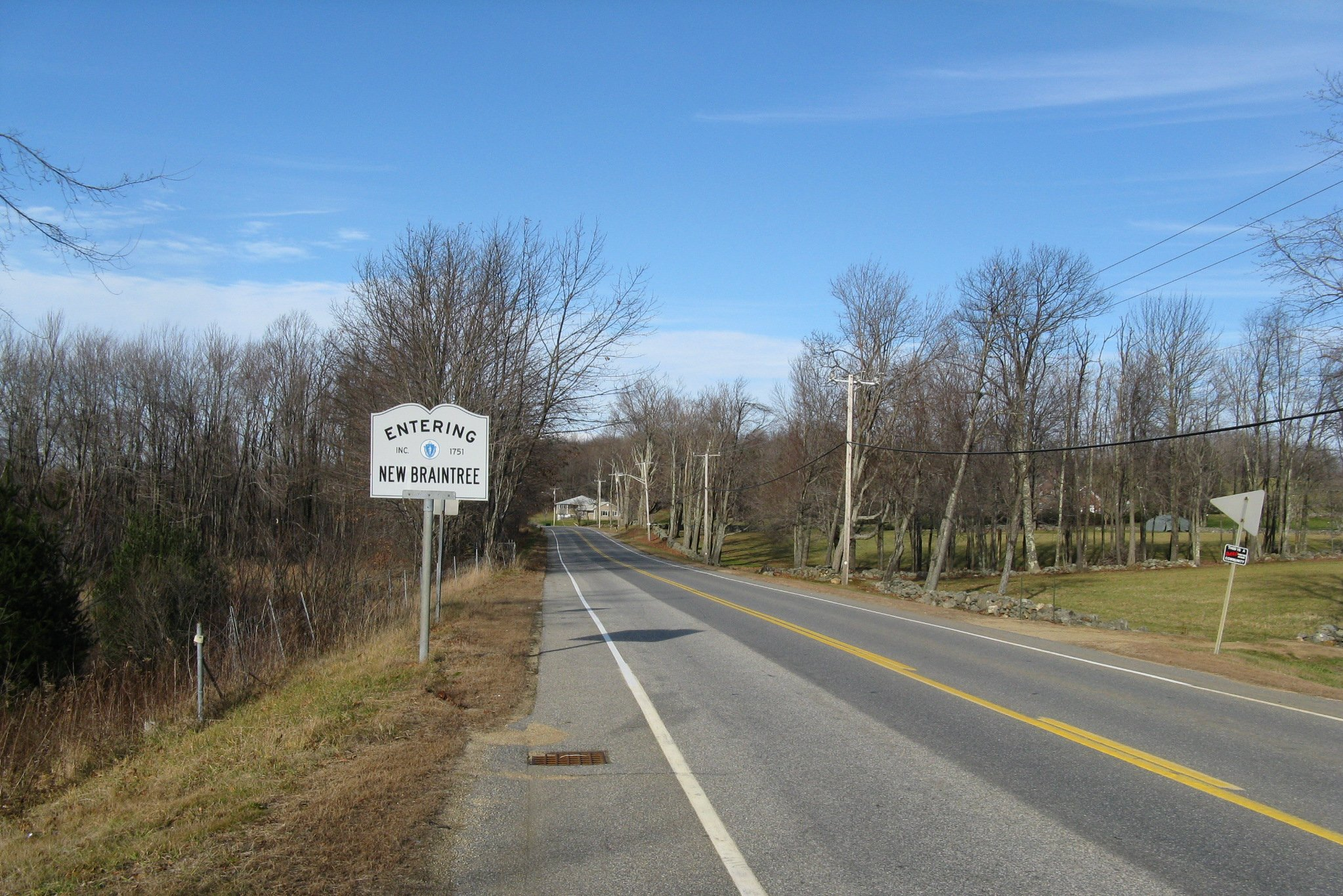
Northbound entering New Braintree

County	Location	mi	km	Destinations	Notes
Hampden	Palmer	0.00	0.00	US 20 – Palmer, Springfield, Brimfield	Southern terminus
Worcester	Warren	8.6	13.8	Route 19 south – Brimfield, Wales	Southern end of Route 19 concurrency
Worcester	West Brookfield	11.1	17.9	Route 9 west – Ware, Amherst Route 19 ends	Southern end of Route 9 concurrency; northern terminus of Route 19
Worcester	West Brookfield	12.1	19.5	Route 9 east – Brookfield, Spencer	Northern end of Route 9 concurrency
Worcester	North Brookfield	15.4	24.8	Route 148 south – Brookfield, Sturbridge	Southern end of Route 148 concurrency
Worcester	North Brookfield	17.2	27.7	Route 148 north – Oakham	Northern end of Route 148 concurrency
Worcester	Barre	24.81	39.93	Route 32 – Barre, Athol, Hardwick, Ware	Northern terminus
1.000 mi = 1.609 km; 1.000 km = 0.621 mi: Concurrency terminus
