= Massachusetts Route 109 =

State highway in eastern Massachusetts, US

Route 109
- Route 109 highlighted in red

Route information
- Maintained by MassDOT
- Length: 20.97 mi (33.75 km)
- Existed: 1933–present

Major junctions
- West end: Route 16 in Milford
- I-495 in Milford; Route 126 in Medway; Route 115 in Millis; Route 27 in Medfield; I-95 / Route 128 in Westwood-Dedham
- East end: VFW Parkway in Boston

Location
- Country: United States
- State: Massachusetts
- Counties: Worcester, Norfolk, Suffolk

Highway system
- Massachusetts State Highway System; Interstate; US; State
← Route 108	→ Route 109A

Route 109 is a 20.97-mile-long (33.75 km) state highway in eastern Massachusetts. It runs from Route 16 in Milford east to the VFW Parkway in Boston. Most of Route 109 runs along a portion of the Hartford and Dedham Turnpike.

== Route description ==
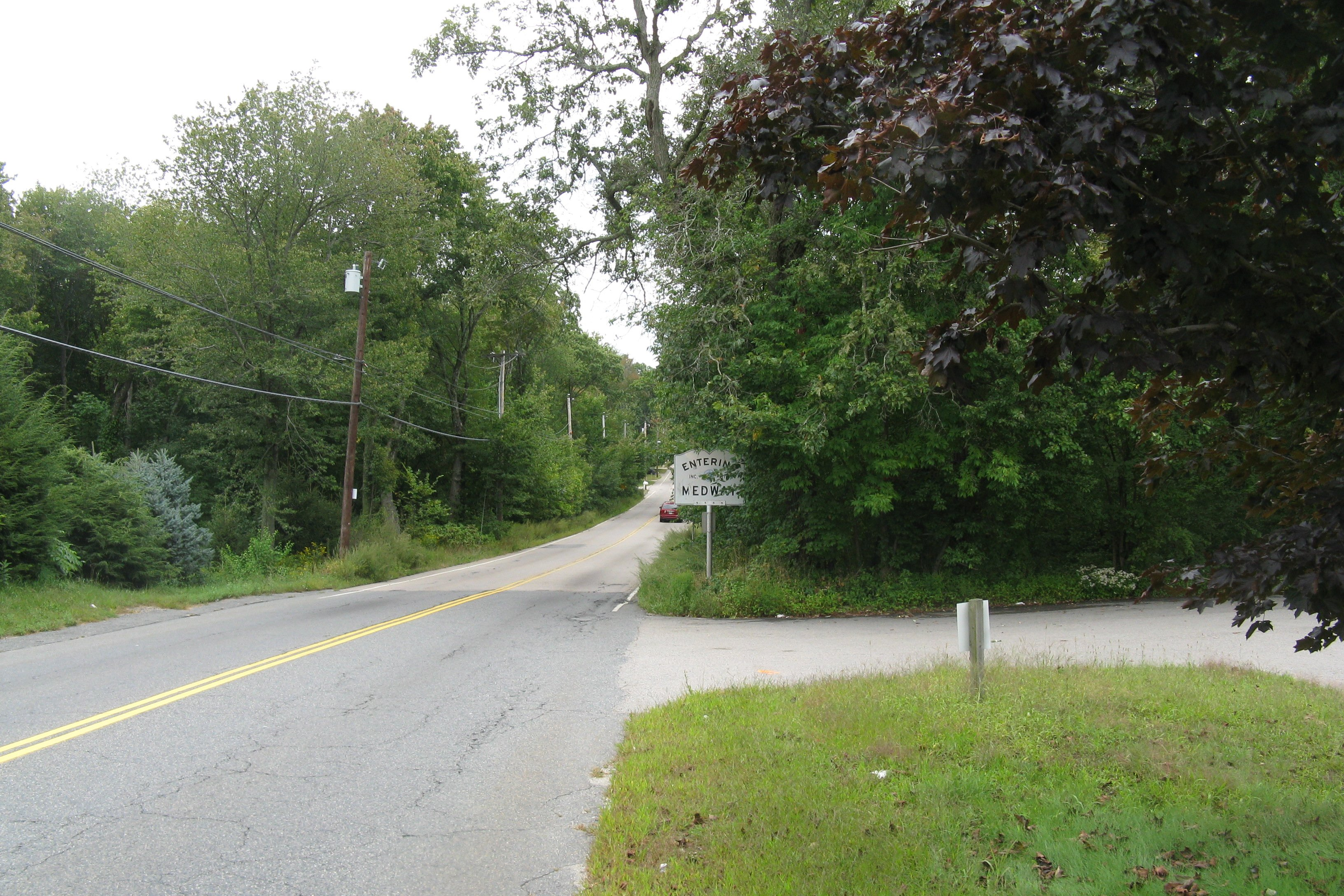
Route 109 eastbound entering Medway.

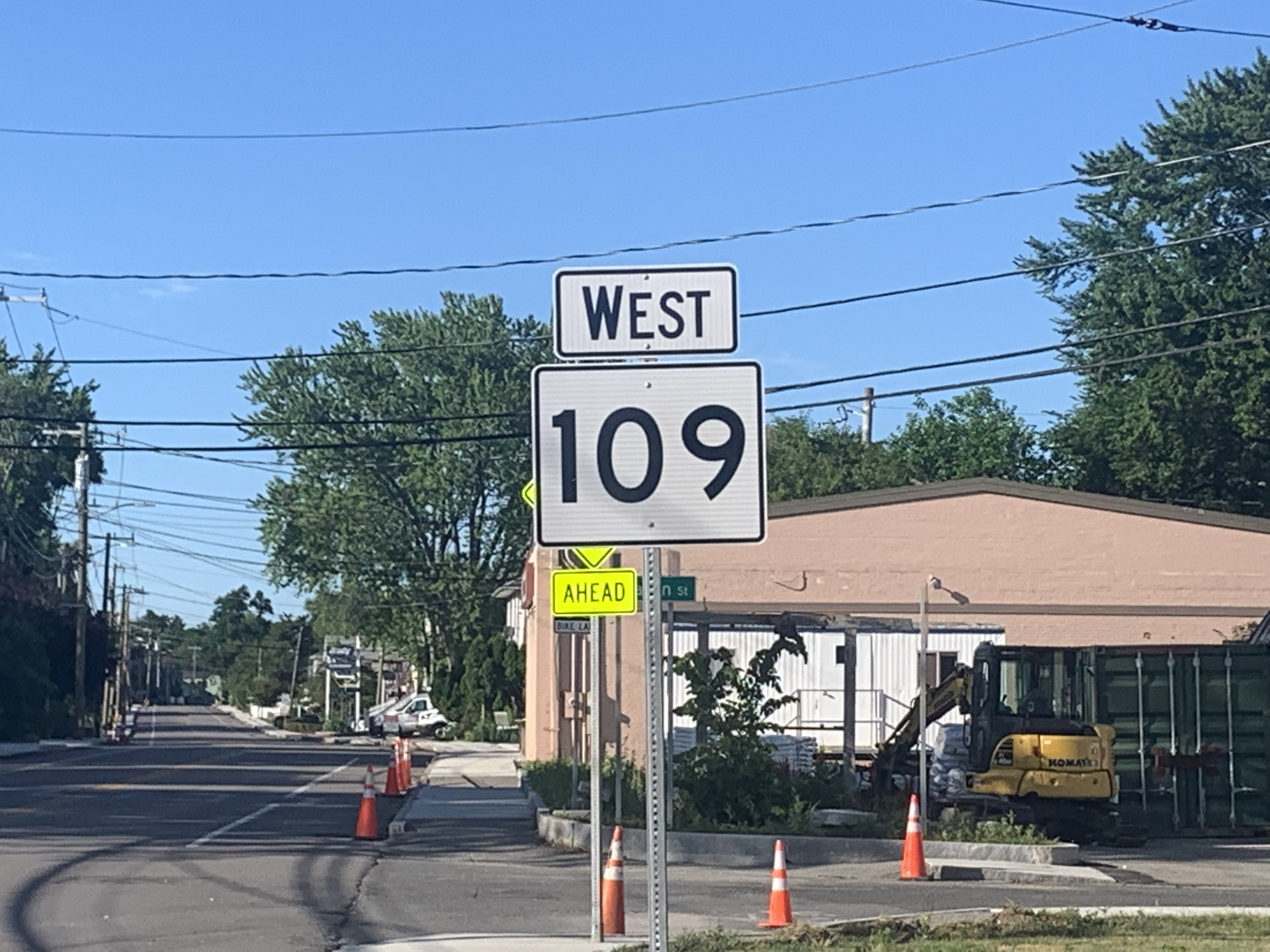
A westbound reassurance marker on Bridge Street in Dedham.

Route 109 begins at Route 16 in Milford, just east of the downtown area. The route proceeds to the east, meeting Interstate 495 (I-495) at exit 19 before crossing into Norfolk County and the town of Medway. Route 109 passes through northern Medway, crossing Route 126 along the way before turning onto Main Street. The highway continues into Millis, where it crosses Route 115 in the center of town. The road then crosses the Charles River as it enters Medfield, passing through the center of town where it intersects Route 27.

East of Medfield, Route 109 travels along the Dover–Walpole town line before entering Westwood. The highway passes through the town, easing towards the urban landscape of metro Boston. North of the center of town, Route 109 intersects I-95/Route 128 at exit 31 (old exit 16) as it enters Dedham. Route 109 passes through northwest Dedham, crossing the Charles twice more before crossing into the Boston neighborhood of West Roxbury, where it immediately meets the VFW Parkway and ends.

The VFW Parkway, which has its southern terminus at the intersection with Route 109, formerly carried U.S. Route 1 (US 1) into the city, before US 1 was rerouted along I-95 and I-93 through Braintree and downtown Boston, due to the cancellation of I-95 in Boston during the 1970s. As such, Route 109 no longer ends at a numbered highway, although the Boston-Providence Turnpike runs south from this intersection to join the current US 1 at its interchange with I-95/Route 128. South of the interchange, US 1 runs along the Turnpike.

== History ==
The Hartford and Dedham Turnpike was chartered on March 9, 1804, to close a gap in the turnpikes that were being built to replace the Middle Post Road between Dedham and Hartford. It ran from Dedham southwest to West Medway, where it continued as the earlier Ninth Massachusetts Turnpike and Boston Turnpike to Hartford, Connecticut. North of Dedham, the Norfolk and Bristol Turnpike continued to Boston. The turnpike, built in 1807, was never a success. In 1821 it was closed to all but local travel due to its condition; it became a free road in 1830, with the rest of the route to Hartford becoming free in 1838.

The path of the road is now mostly covered by Route 109. The turnpike entered Dedham Square using High Street, and in Westwood, Dover and Medfield the old turnpike exists as Hartford Street, while Route 109 uses the older alignment with better grades. Near the west end, Route 109 turns west towards Milford, and the turnpike continues southwest on Main Street to end at its merge with Route 126 and the Middle Post Road.

The original Route 109 went from US 7 in Pittsfield to US 20 in West Brookfield along what is now Route 9. This western section of Route 109 was decommissioned in 1933, during the flooding of the Quabbin Reservoir, as it had run through the center of Enfield, Massachusetts, a town itself disincorporated in late April 1938 due to the flooding of the Quabbin Reservoir.

== Major intersections ==
County	Location	mi	km	Destinations	Notes
Worcester	Milford	0.0	0.0	Route 16 to Route 85 – Milford, Uxbridge, Douglas, Webster	Western terminus; serves Milford Regional Medical Center
Worcester	Milford	1.0	1.6	I-495 – Taunton, Cape Cod, Marlboro, Lowell	Exit 48 on I-495
Norfolk	Medway	3.2	5.1	Route 126 – Bellingham, Woonsocket, RI, Holliston, Framingham	
Norfolk	Millis	8.0	12.9	Route 115 – Sherborn, Natick, Norfolk, Foxborough	
Norfolk	Medfield	10.8	17.4	Route 27 – Walpole, Brockton, Sherborn, Natick	
Norfolk	Westwood–Dedham line	18.1	29.1	I-95 / Route 128 – Canton, Providence, RI, Peabody, Portsmouth, NH	Exits 31A-B on I-95
Suffolk	Boston	20.97	33.75	VFW Parkway	Eastern terminus; continues east to Route 203 and Route 28
1.000 mi = 1.609 km; 1.000 km = 0.621 mi
