= U.S. Route 20 in Massachusetts =

Section of U.S. Highway in Massachusetts

U.S. Route 20
- US 20 highlighted in red

Route information
- Maintained by MassDOT
- Length: 153.44 mi (246.94 km)
- Existed: 1926–present

Major junctions
- West end: US 20 at the New York state line in New Lebanon, NY
- US 7 from Pittsfield to Lenox; I-90 Toll / Mass Pike / Route 102 in Lee; US 202 / Route 10 in Westfield; US 5 in West Springfield; I-91 / Route 20A in Springfield; I-84 in Sturbridge; I-90 / Mass Pike / I-290 / I-395 / Route 12 in Auburn; I-90 Toll / Mass Pike / Route 122A / Route 146 in Millbury; I-495 in Marlborough; I-95 / Route 128 in Waltham
- East end: Route 2 in Boston

Location
- Country: United States
- State: Massachusetts
- Counties: Berkshire, Hampshire, Hampden, Worcester, Middlesex, Suffolk

Highway system
- United States Numbered Highway System; List; Special; Divided; Massachusetts State Highway System; Interstate; US; State
← Route 19	→ Route 21
← Route 4	N.E.	→ Route 6

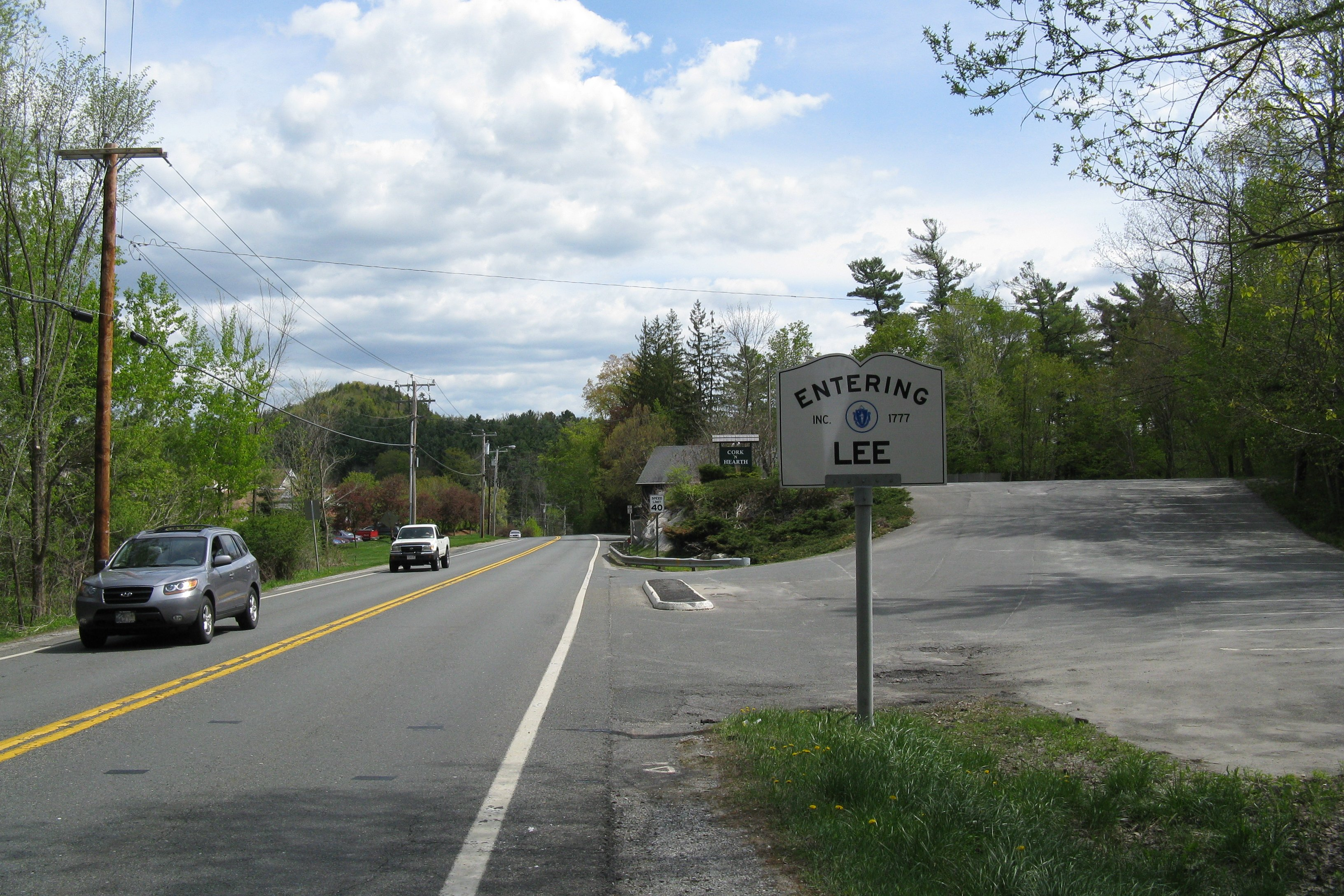
Southbound entering Lee

U.S. Route 20 (US 20) runs its easternmost 153 miles (246 km) in the U.S. state of Massachusetts. The highway crosses the state border from New Lebanon, New York, into Hancock and runs eastward to Boston, where it ends at Route 2 in Kenmore Square. It spends the vast majority of its journey paralleling I-90 (Massachusetts Turnpike), which has largely superseded US 20 for through travel. Still, US 20 directly serves many towns and local business areas which the turnpike bypasses.

US 20 is currently the longest numbered highway in the entire country, at an estimated length of 3,365 miles (5,415 km) between Boston and Newport, Oregon.

Parts of US 20 between the Worcester and Boston areas are part of an alignment of the Boston Post Road, an early colonial highway designated in 1673 for carrying mail between New York City and Boston. US 20 is still locally known as the "Boston Post Road" in the towns of Northborough, Marlborough, Sudbury, Wayland, and Weston.

== Route description ==
=== Berkshire, Hampshire, and Hampden counties ===
US 20 begins its eastward trek crossing the New York state border into Hancock and passing through the southern edge of the Pittsfield State Forest before entering Pittsfield and serving as the northern terminus of Route 41. The highway enters downtown and meets US 7, near the western terminus of Route 9. After its intersection with US 7, US 20 heads south, and the two routes form a concurrency into the town of Lenox. In Lenox, Route 7A splits off from the main road to serve the center of town, and US 20 splits from US 7 shortly thereafter to travel through the town of Lee to the southeast. The highway passes through Lee and has an interchange with I-90 (Massachusetts Turnpike) at exit 10 (formerly exit 2), south of town, near the eastern terminus of Route 102. Becoming the Jacob's Ladder Scenic Byway for the next 30 miles (48 km), US 20 returns to its eastward direction at this point and closely parallels the Mass Pike, having three non-interchange junctions with it before entering the town of Becket and meeting Route 8. Route 8 northbound forms a concurrency with US 20 to directly serve the town, while the Mass Pike passes south of Becket. Upon crossing through the town center, Route 8 splits from US 20, and it continues eastbound, passing into Hampden County and the town of Chester.

US 20 passes through the small town of Chester and clips the southern portion of Huntington in Hampshire County before reentering Hampden County and passing through the town of Russell. In Russell, US 20 serves as the eastern terminus of Route 23, passes under the Mass Pike, and continues into Westfield to finish off the scenic byway. In Westfield, US 20 crosses the US 202 Route 10 concurrency in the city's center and serves as the northern terminus of Route 187 just to the east. US 20 begins to enter urban landscape as it crosses into West Springfield, making its way through downtown, intersecting US 5, and crossing the Connecticut River into the city of Springfield. Immediately upon entering the city, US 20 interchanges with Interstate 91 (I-91) at exit 6 (formerly exit 8), where it leaves the surface street (which is picked up by Route 20A (Note: Route 20A is not a former alignment of US 20. Before the construction of I-291, US 20 followed Main Street, State Street, and Boston Road)), to join I-291, which begins just to the south. US 20 is concurrent with most of I-291, about five miles (8.0 km). It splits off from the interstate via exit 5, where it meets the eastern end of Route 20A and resumes its surface alignment on Page Boulevard in Springfield, rejoining its original alignment in Springfield on Boston Road. US 20, as Boston Road, serves as the southern terminus of Route 21 and proceeds east into the town of Wilbraham, where it continues to parallel the Mass Pike. In Palmer, US 20 serves as the southern terminus of Route 181 and then intersects Route 32, which provides close access to the Mass Pike at exit 63 (formerly exit 8). US 20 and Route 32 share a short concurrency in downtown Palmer, before US 20 splits and continues east. Before leaving Palmer, Route 67 meets its southern terminus at US 20. Brimfield is the last town US 20 passes through in Hampden County; it enters from the west, crosses Route 19 in the center of town, and proceeds out of town to the east.

=== Worcester and Middlesex counties ===
US 20 crosses into Worcester County and the town of Sturbridge, immediately serving as the southern terminus of Route 148. The route continues east where it serves as the western terminus of Route 131 before having an interchange with I-84 at exit 6 (formerly exit 3). I-84 is another quick route north to the Mass Pike, as it ends there less than a mile (1.6 km) away. Route 49, a short connector to Route 9 in Spencer, has its southern terminus at US 20 east of the I-84 interchange. US 20 enters the town of Charlton, passing through the village of Charlton City where it serves as the northern terminus of Route 169 and intersects with Route 31. Continuing east, US 20 enters the town of Auburn, where it briefly has a concurrency with Route 12. Route 12 provides direct access to the Mass Pike at exit 90 (formerly exit 10), while US 20 has an interchange with I-395, which ends at I-290 north of the Mass Pike interchange. US 20 continues to the northeast, entering Millbury after briefly crossing into southern Worcester, where it has an interchange with the Mass Pike at exit 94 (formerly exit 10A), as well as with Route 146 which at this point has a concurrency with Route 122A. The route reenters Worcester, crossing over Route 122 in a non-highway interchange. Leaving Worcester, US 20 enters the city of Shrewsbury, having another non-highway interchange with Route 140 south of downtown. The highway continues to the northeast, once again having a non-highway interchanging with Route 9. Heading almost due north at this point, US 20 crosses into Northborough and turns back eastward, serving as the western terminus of Route 135 in the town center. Two local roads, Church and Hudson streets, provide access to nearby I-290, which runs to the north. US 20 proceeds out of Northborough to the northeast, crossing into Marlborough and Middlesex County.

US 20 enters Marlborough and interchanges with I-495 (also referred to as the Outer Circumferential Highway and the Blue Star Memorial Highway) at exit 63 (formerly exit 24), effectively crossing into Boston's western suburbs. The route directly serves the center of town, intersecting with Route 85 in the process. It is in eastern Marlborough where US 20 begins to be famously referred to as Boston Post Road, and the road continues eastward into the town of Sudbury. Leaving Sudbury, US 20 intersects the Route 27/Route 126 concurrency in Wayland, and continues into Weston. US 20 does not intersect any major roads or numbered highways in Weston but does follow an approximately mile-long (1.6 km) bypass of the Boston Post Road (appropriately named Boston Post Road Bypass) between Highland and Wellesley streets, where US 20 rejoins the road and continues east into Waltham. The entire length of US 20 in Weston is designated as the Boston Post Road Historic District, since it retains much of its rural 18th-century character. Immediately upon crossing into Waltham, US 20 has an interchange with the concurrent I-95/Route 128 at exit 41 (formerly exit 26), marking the change from suburban landscape to the urban landscape of metro Boston. US 20 serves as the eastern terminus of Route 117 and passes through the center of Waltham and its downtown, serving as Main Street east of Route 117. In Waltham, US 20 also serves as the western terminus of Route 60, an urban route serving Boston's northern suburbs. The route continues into the city of Watertown serving as its Main Street to Watertown Square, where it has a major junction with Route 16, which passes west and north of Boston, through Cambridge and Medford. US 20 becomes North Beacon Street at this point and continues southeast as it crosses into the city of Boston over the North Beacon Street Bridge.

=== Suffolk County ===
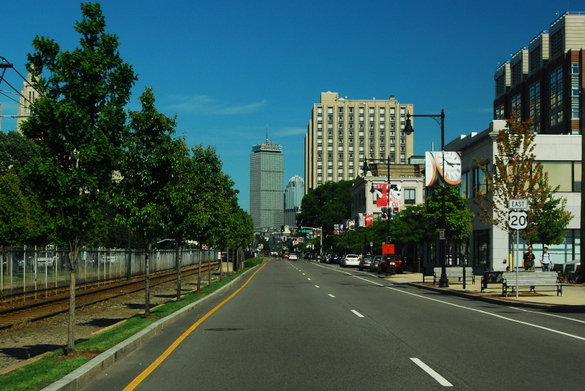
US 20 eastbound approaching Kenmore Square, Boston

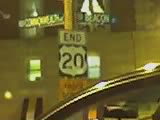
The former eastern terminus sign of US 20 in Boston before being replaced

US 20 briefly continues as Leo F. Birmingham Parkway upon crossing into the Boston neighborhood of Brighton, immediately intersecting the western end of Soldiers Field Road Extension. The route then turns right and continues as North Beacon Street again, crossing under the Mass Pike with no interchange. US 20 continues toward downtown, passing through the Allston neighborhood of Boston. Upon crossing Cambridge Street, US 20 becomes known as Brighton Avenue for a short distance. US 20 soon reaches Commonwealth Avenue, serving as the eastern terminus for Route 30. At this point, US 20 passes through the Boston University campus. US 20 meets Route 2 at the southern end of the Boston University Bridge, crossing over the Mass Pike for the final time without an interchange. Route 2, via Mountfort Street, Park Drive, and Beacon Street, turns from south to east to meet US 20 at Kenmore Square. Upon meeting Route 2 again, US 20 meets its eastern terminus, with Route 2 taking Commonwealth Avenue its final stretch to the Boston Public Garden and Route 28, where Route 2 meets its own end.

US 20's official eastern terminus is in Kenmore Square at the intersection of Commonwealth Avenue, Beacon Street, and Brookline Avenue.

== Major intersections ==
County	Location	mi	km	Exit	Destinations	Notes
Berkshire	Hancock	0.000	0.000		US 20 west – New Lebanon	Continuation into New York
Berkshire	Pittsfield	3.336	5.369		Route 41 south to I-90 Toll (Mass Pike) / Route 102 – Richmond, West Stockbridge	Northern terminus of Route 41
Berkshire	Pittsfield	7.431	11.959		Route 9 east – Dalton	Western terminus of Route 9
Berkshire	Pittsfield	7.596	12.225		US 7 north – Williamstown	Western end of US 7 concurrency
Berkshire	Lenox	12.845	20.672		Route 7A south to Route 183 – Historic Lenox	Northern terminus of Route 7A; former routing of US 7
Berkshire	Lenox	12.845	20.672	Western end of limited-access section		
Berkshire	Lenox	14.132	22.743		Housatonic Street – Lenox Center, Lenox Dale	At-grade intersection
Berkshire	Lenox	14.694	23.648		Route 183 south (Walker Street) – Historic Lenox, Tanglewood, October Mountain, Lenox Dale	At-grade intersection; northern terminus of Route 183
Berkshire	Lenox	15.001	24.142		US 7 south – Stockbridge, Great Barrington	At-grade intersection; eastern end of US 7 concurrency
Berkshire	Lenox	15.001	24.142	Eastern end of limited-access section		
Berkshire	Lee	17.405	28.011	Bridge over Housatonic River		
Berkshire	Lee	18.766– 18.836	30.201– 30.314		I-90 Toll / Mass Pike / Route 102 west – Springfield, Boston, West Stockbridge, Albany, NY	Exit 10 on I-90 / Mass Pike; eastern terminus of Route 102
Berkshire	Becket	25.719	41.391		Route 8 south – Otis, Winsted, CT	Western end of Route 8 concurrency
Berkshire	Becket	30.895	49.721		Route 8 north – Becket, Dalton	Eastern end of Route 8 concurrency
Hampshire	Huntington	41.831	67.320		Route 112 north to Route 66 – Huntington	Southern terminus of Route 112
Hampden	Russell	48.016	77.274		Route 23 west – Blandford, Otis	Eastern terminus of Route 23
Hampden	Westfield	53.752	86.505		US 202 north / Route 10 north – Holyoke	Western end of US 202/Route 10 concurrency
Hampden	Westfield	54.004	86.911		US 202 south / Route 10 south – Southwick, New Haven, CT	Eastern end of US 202/Route 10 concurrency
Hampden	Westfield	55.770	89.753		Route 187 south – Feeding Hills	Northern terminus of Route 187
Hampden	West Springfield	61.577	99.099		US 5 – Agawam, Holyoke, Northampton	Rotary interchange
Hampden	Connecticut River	61.697	99.292	Bridge		
Hampden	Springfield	62.739	100.969		I-91 / Route 20A east – Holyoke, Greenfield, Hartford, CT	Western terminus of Route 20A; exit 7B on I-91
Hampden	Springfield	63.135	101.606	Western end of freeway section		
Hampden	Springfield	63.135	101.606	1	I-91 – Holyoke, Greenfield, Hartford, CT I-291 begins	Westbound exit and eastbound entrance; signed as exits 1A (I-91 south) and 1B (I-91 north); western terminus of I-291
Hampden	Springfield	63.261	101.809	2A	Chestnut Street – Springfield	
Hampden	Springfield	64.012	103.017	3	Armory Street	
Hampden	Springfield	65.082	104.739	4	St. James Avenue – Chicopee Falls	
Hampden	Springfield	66.559	107.116	5	I-291 east / Route 20A west to I-90 Toll / Mass Pike – Chicopee, East Springfield, Boston	Signed as exits 5A (I-291 east) and 5B (I-291 west) eastbound; I-90 not signed eastbound; eastern end of I-291 concurrency
Hampden	Springfield	66.559	107.116	Eastern end of freeway section		
Hampden	Springfield	70.388	113.279		Route 21 north (Route 141 west) – Ludlow, Chicopee, Indian Orchard	Southern terminus of Route 21; eastern terminus of Route 141
Hampden	Palmer	78.782	126.787		Route 181 north – Belchertown	Southern terminus of Route 181
Hampden	Palmer	79.794	128.416		Route 32 north to I-90 Toll (Mass Pike) – Ware, Barre	Western end of Route 32 concurrency
Hampden	Palmer	80.775	129.995		Route 32 south – Monson, Stafford Springs, CT	Eastern end of Route 32 concurrency
Hampden	Palmer	82.461	132.708		Route 67 north – Warren, Brookfield	Southern terminus of Route 67
Hampden	Brimfield	87.867	141.408		Route 19 – Wales, Stafford, CT, Warren, West Brookfield	
Worcester	Sturbridge	92.813	149.368		Route 148 north – Brookfield, North Brookfield	Southern terminus of Route 148
Worcester	Sturbridge	94.467	152.030		Route 131 east – Sturbridge, Southbridge	Western terminus of Route 131
Worcester	Sturbridge	94.831	152.616		I-84 to I-90 Toll / Mass Pike – Hartford, CT, Boston, Springfield	Exits 6A and 6B on I-84; I-84 east not signed; former I-86
Worcester	Sturbridge	96.795	155.776		Route 49 north to Route 9 – Spencer	Southern terminus of Route 49
Worcester	Charlton	99.991	160.920		Route 169 south – Southbridge, Putnam, CT	Northern terminus of Route 169
Worcester	Charlton	100.393	161.567		Route 31 – Dudley, Spencer, Paxton	
Worcester	Oxford	105.826	170.310		Route 56 – Oxford, Webster, Leicester	
Worcester	Auburn	106.731	171.767		Route 12 south – Webster	Western end of Route 12 concurrency
Worcester	Auburn	107.413	172.864		Route 12 north to I-90 (Mass Pike) – Auburn, Boston, Worcester	Eastern end of Route 12 concurrency
Worcester	Auburn	108.624	174.813		I-90 (Mass Pike) / I-290 east / I-395 south / Route 12 – Norwich, CT, Worcester	Exit 90 on I-90 / Mass Pike; exit 11 on I-395; Route 12 not signed
Worcester	Millbury	112.510	181.067		I-90 Toll / Mass Pike / Route 146 (Route 122A) – Worcester, Providence, RI, Boston, Springfield	Exit 94 on I-90 / Mass Pike; exit 18 on Route 146
Worcester	Worcester	115.252	185.480		Route 122 – Grafton, Providence, RI, Worcester, Barre, Uxbridge	Interchange
Worcester	Shrewsbury	117.548	189.175		Route 140 – Grafton, Milford, Uxbridge, Shrewsbury	Interchange
Worcester	Northborough	120.697	194.243		Route 9 – Westboro, Boston, Shrewsbury, Worcester	Interchange
Worcester	Northborough	123.895	199.390		Route 135 east – Westboro, Hopkinton	Western terminus of Route 135
Middlesex	Marlborough	127.683	205.486		I-495 – Taunton, Cape Cod, Lowell, Lawrence	Exits 63A-B on I-495
Middlesex	Marlborough	129.519	208.441		Route 85 – Southboro, Milford, Hudson, Bolton	
Middlesex	Wayland	139.707	224.837		Route 27 / Route 126 (Cochituate Road) – Sudbury, Concord, Natick, Framingham	
Middlesex	Waltham	144.589	232.693		I-95 (Route 128) to I-90 Toll (Mass Pike) – Providence, RI, Portsmouth, NH	Rotary interchange; exit 41 on I-95
Middlesex	Waltham	145.808	234.655		Route 117 west – Maynard, Leominster	Eastern terminus of Route 117
Middlesex	Waltham	147.073	236.691		Route 60 east – Belmont, Arlington	Western terminus of Route 60
Middlesex	Watertown	149.373	240.393		Route 16 – West Newton, Cambridge	
Charles River		150.683	242.501	North Beacon Street Bridge		
Suffolk	Boston	152.654	245.673		Route 30 west (Commonwealth Avenue) – Newton, Framingham	Eastern terminus of Route 30
Suffolk	Boston	153.365	246.817		Route 2 west (Essex Street) – Cambridge, Arlington	
Suffolk	Boston	154.11	248.02		Route 2 east (Beacon Street) – Downtown Boston	Eastern terminus of US 20
1.000 mi = 1.609 km; 1.000 km = 0.621 mi: Concurrency terminus; Tolled

== Suffixed routes ==
Route 20A
- Location: Springfield
- Length: 4.14 mi (6.66 km)

Route 20A is a state highway located entirely within Springfield. The route, an alternate route of US 20, parallels the section of US 20 concurrent with I-291. The western terminus is at the junction of US 20 and I-91 in Downtown Springfield east of where US 20 crosses the Connecticut River on the North End Bridge. The eastern terminus is at the junction between US 20 and I-291 northeast of the heart of the city.

This alignment provides an alternate to I-291, which overlaps US 20 for much of its length, but was originally an alternate to old US 20, which ran down State Street and Boston Road. This route was therefore never part of US 20 but has served as an alternate to two separate routes.

Major intersections
The entire route is in Springfield, Hampden County.

mi	km	Destinations	Notes
0.00	0.00	I-91 north / US 20 west – West Springfield, Westfield, Greenfield	Western terminus; exit 7A on I-91 south
0.31	0.50	Route 116 north (Main Street)	Southern terminus of Route 116
4.15	6.68	I-291 / US 20 to I-90 / Mass Pike / I-91 – Indian Orchard	Eastern terminus; exit 5B on I-291
1.000 mi = 1.609 km; 1.000 km = 0.621 mi: Incomplete access

== Notes ==
U.S. Route 20
Previous state: New York	Massachusetts	Next state: Terminus
