= Massachusetts Route 135 =

State highway in Massachusetts, US

Route 135
- Route 135 highlighted in red

Route information
- Maintained by MassDOT
- Length: 29.53 mi (47.52 km)
- Existed: 1927–present

Major junctions
- West end: US 20 in Northborough
- Route 9 / Route 30 in Westborough; Route 85 in Hopkinton; Route 126 in Framingham; Route 27 in Natick; Route 16 in Wellesley
- East end: I-95 / Route 128 in Dedham

Location
- Country: United States
- State: Massachusetts
- Counties: Worcester, Middlesex, Norfolk

Highway system
- Massachusetts State Highway System; Interstate; US; State
← Route 134	→ Route 136

Route 135 is a 29.53-mile-long (47.52 km) east-west state highway in eastern Massachusetts. The western terminus is at U.S. Route 20 in Northborough and the eastern terminus is at I-95 and Route 128 in Dedham.

The first 13 miles (21 km) of the Boston Marathon, from Hopkinton to Wellesley, follow Route 135.

== Route description ==
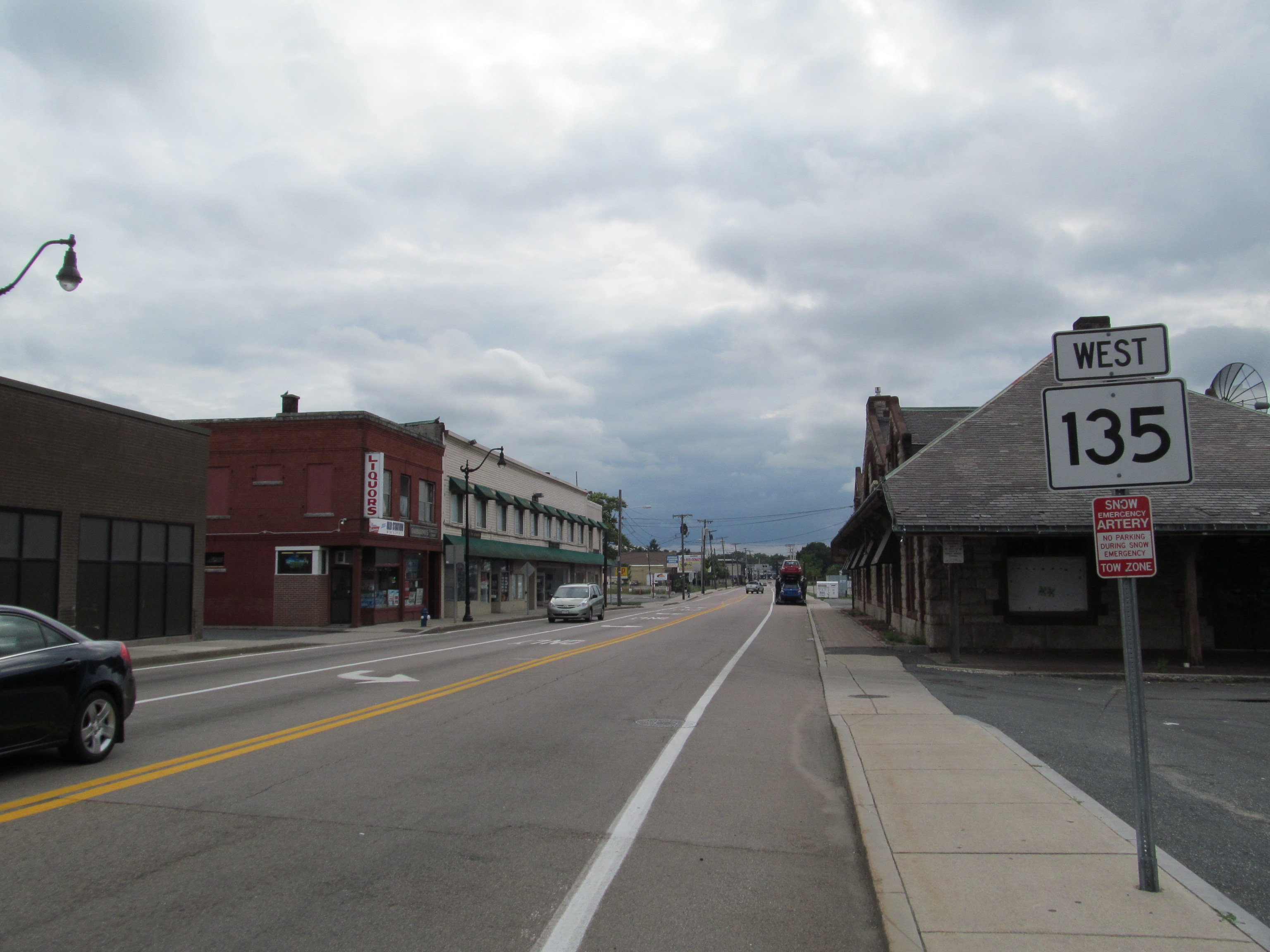
Route 135 westbound in Framingham

Route 135 begins at US 20 in Northborough. The route initially follows a southeasterly path, interchanging with Route 9 approximately 2.6 miles (4.2 km) from its beginning. Continuing into Westborough, Route 135 meets Route 30 at a rotary. The highway continues southeast, crossing underneath Interstate 90 and Interstate 495, but interchanging with neither. The route enters Hopkinton, and turns northeast at an intersection with West Main Street, which provides nearby access to I-495. Route 135 crosses Route 85 just to the east, then continues through Ashland and into Framingham. In downtown Framingham, Route 135 crosses Route 126. Route 135 continues into Natick and crosses Route 27 in the center of town. The road continues into Wellesley, passing by the campus of Wellesley College before entering the downtown area. Route 135 and Route 16 meet at a 5-way intersection and have a short concurrency. Route 135 splits off Route 16 at Wellesley Avenue, then turns southeast onto Great Plain Avenue. The highway enters Needham, and splits off Great Plain Avenue towards Dedham. Upon entering Dedham, Route 135 intersects I-95 and Route 128 at exit 32 and meets its eastern terminus.

== History ==
Route 135 is one of the state's earliest highway routes established circa 1927. The eastern terminus was originally located at Route 128, at what is now Exit 35 (formerly Exit 19). Route 135 traveled west and south on Highland Avenue into downtown Needham, then west onto Great Plain Avenue and its current routing. Streets along this route include Great Plain and Wellesley Avenues in Needham, Central Street in Wellesley, East and West Central Streets in Natick, Waverly Street in Framingham, Union and West Union Streets in Ashland, Main Street and Wood Street in Hopkinton, and Hopkinton Road and Milk Street in Westborough. The western terminus was originally located in Westborough at Route 115, which is now Route 9.

In 1931 the route was extended further west along Milk Street and onto South Street in Southborough and Northborough to US 20.

In 1932 the route was extended east taking over the original routing of Route 128 from Needham to the intersection of Route 3 (now Route 53 and Route 3A) in Quincy. Streets along this part of the route included Dedham Avenue in Needham, West and East Common Street, High Street and Milton Street in Dedham, West Milton Street and Neponset Valley Parkway in Boston, Milton Street, Canton Avenue and Centre Street in Milton, and Adams and Washington Streets in Quincy. This part of route was truncated in the late 1950s after completion of the Route 128 expressway between Needham and Braintree made Route 135's routing redundant. The route was cut back to downtown Needham, then routed along Dedham Avenue to terminate at Route 128.

== Major intersections ==
County	Location	mi	km	Destinations	Notes
Worcester	Northborough	0.00	0.00	US 20 (West Main Street / Main Street) – Marlborough, Sudbury, Shrewsbury	Western terminus
Worcester	Westborough	2.6	4.2	Route 9 (Turnpike Road) – Worcester, Springfield, Framingham, Boston	Partial interchange; access between Route 9 west/Route 135 east and Route 9 east/Route 135 west via Milk Street (at-grade).
Worcester	Westborough	4.2	6.8	Route 30 (West Main Street / East Main Street) to Route 140 / Route 122 – North Grafton, Millbury, Southborough	Rotary
Middlesex	Hopkinton	10.0	16.1	West Main Street to I-495 / Route 140 – Upton	Via West Main St
Middlesex	Hopkinton	10.5	16.9	Route 85 (Cedar Street / Grove St) – Southborough, Marlborough, Milford, Bellingham	
Middlesex	Framingham	17.3	27.8	Route 126 (Concord Street / Irving Street) – Saxonville, Ashland, Holliston, Wayland	
Middlesex	Natick	21.0	33.8	Route 27 (Main Street / South Main Street) – Wayland, Sudbury, Sherborn, Medfield	
Norfolk	Wellesley	24.0	38.6	Route 16 west (Washington Street) – South Natick, Sherborn	Western end of Route 16 concurrency
Norfolk	Wellesley	24.2	38.9	Route 16 east (Washington Street) – Wellesley Hills, Cambridge	Eastern end of Route 16 concurrency
Norfolk	Dedham	29.53	47.52	I-95 / Route 128 – Canton, Providence, RI, Peabody, Portsmouth, NH	Eastern terminus; exit 32 on I-95, continue east on to Route 109
1.000 mi = 1.609 km; 1.000 km = 0.621 mi: Concurrency terminus
