= Massachusetts Route 85 =

North-south state highway in Massachusetts, US

Route 85
- Route 85 highlighted in red

Route information
- Maintained by MassDOT
- Length: 21.01 mi (33.81 km)

Major junctions
- South end: Route 16 in Milford
- I-495 in Milford; Route 135 in Hopkinton; Route 9 / Route 30 in Southborough; US 20 in Marlborough
- North end: Route 117 in Bolton

Location
- Country: United States
- State: Massachusetts

Highway system
- Massachusetts State Highway System; Interstate; US; State
← I-84	→ I-86

Route 85 is a 21.01-mile-long (33.81 km) north–south state highway in Massachusetts, United States. It passes through the heart of Boston's MetroWest region, through towns on the eastern edge of Worcester County and western edge of Middlesex County, crossing the border between the two counties four times. Throughout its entire distance, Route 85 runs parallel to I-495, never passing more than two miles from it.

== Route description ==
Route 85 begins in the town of Milford at Route 16, just east of the downtown area. It passes east of Milford Pond before having a junction with I-495 at Exit 20. From there, Route 85 heads northward into Hopkinton, passing the eastern side of Echo Lake. It intersects Route 135 at the center of town, less than a quarter mile west of the starting line of the Boston Marathon. It then passes through Hopkinton State Forest and past the Hopkinton Reservoir before entering the town of Southborough.

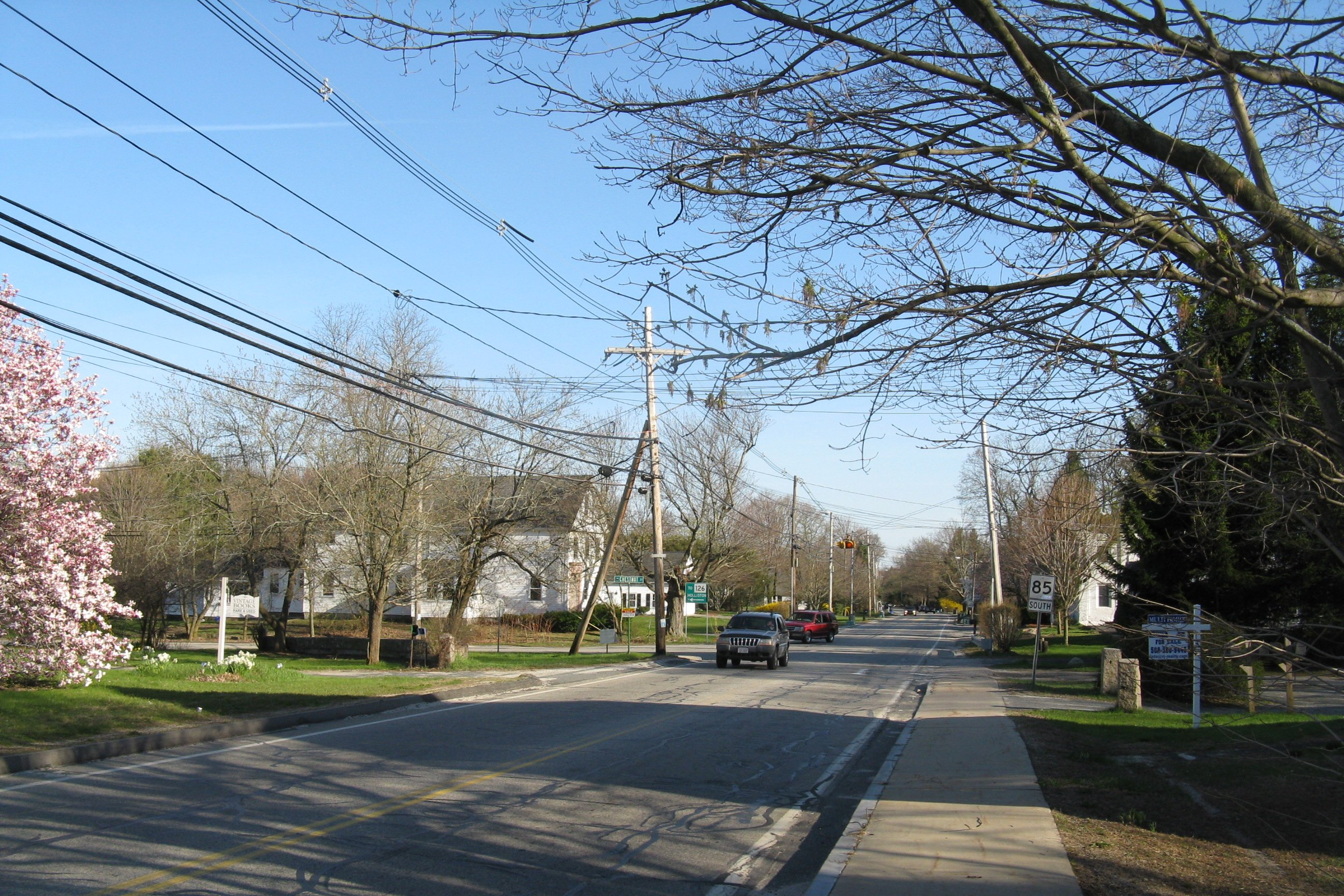
Route 85 southbound in Hopkinton

In Southborough, Route 85 crosses under I-90 (the Mass Pike) without junction; the nearest exit is in neighboring Framingham. It then meets Route 9, the second of the four major east-west routes out of Boston, in an elevated four-way interchange. It then crosses the Sudbury Reservoir before meeting Route 30 at the center of town. From there, Route 85 continues northward into Marlborough, meeting U.S. Route 20 in the downtown area. It then passes the far western edge of the Fort Meadow Reservoir before crossing into Hudson.

Shortly after entering Hudson, Route 85 meets the Route 85 Connector, which provides access to I-290 and I-495. From there Route 85 heads north, crossing the Assabet River before meeting Route 62, passing concurrently with that route through Wood Square before Route 85 continues northward. After passing into Bolton, the route passes between Little Pond and West Pond before ending at Route 117, less than a half mile east of I-495's exit 27.

=== Route 85 Connector ===
The Route 85 Connector is a two-lane expressway that runs from Interstate 495 at the eastern terminus of Interstate 290 to Route 85, 0.9-mile (1.4 km) away in Marlborough.

== Future ==
=== Improvements to Route 85 in Hudson ===
In 2011 a $10.8 million project to reconstruct 7,700 feet (1.5 miles) from School Street/Park Street to the Marlborough City Line begun. The project consisted of a 11-foot (3.4 m) travel lanes and 4-foot (1.2 m) bike shoulders with 5.5-foot (1.7 m) concrete sidewalks throughout the project corridor. The Walmart Driveway was reconstructed with bicycle accommodation, ADA compliance, and a new traffic signal. At the intersection of the Route 85 Connector and Technology Drive, the intersection was reconstructed. A new northbound left turn lane was constructed, new through lane constructed on Technology Drive, new through lane on Route 85 Connector and a new wire traffic signal. The section between Route 85 Connector and Broad Street consisted of four lanes (two in each direction) with a 4-foot (1.2 m) raised concrete median. At the intersection of Broad Street, the existing signal was replaced with a two-lane roundabout. The roadway was widened to four lanes (two in each direction) from Houghton Street to Broad Street. A new traffic signal was installed at R.K Town Centre Drive with a new turn lane. A new traffic signal was installed at Giasson Street. A new northbound left turn lane with a new traffic signal was installed at Brigham Street. From Brigham Street to Park Street, the roadway is now cold planed and resurfaced with drainage, curbing, sidewalks and driveways included. At Park Street/School Street, a new traffic signal was installed and a new southbound right turn lane will be constructed.

=== Hudson Route 85 Bridge ===
Beginning in 2013, MassDOT replaced the existing structurally deficient arch bridge with a new bridge. The estimated cost is $7 million. The project is funded as part of the Accelerated Bridge Program and used innovative construction. The new bridge consists of new concrete reinforced abutments and a new concrete NEXT beam superstructure.

== Major intersections ==
County	Location	mi	km	Destinations	Notes
Worcester	Milford	0.000	0.000	Route 16 (Main Street) to Route 109 – Hopedale, Mendon, Uxbridge, Holliston	Southern terminus; serves Milford Regional Medical Center
Worcester	Milford	1.3	2.1	I-495 – Taunton, Cape Cod, Marlboro, Lowell	Diamond interchange; exit 50 on I-495
Middlesex	Hopkinton	5.9	9.5	Route 135 (Main Street) to I-495 – Westboro, Upton, Ashland	
Worcester	Southborough	10.4	16.7	Route 9 – Framingham, Boston, Worcester, Amherst	Cloverleaf interchange
Worcester	Southborough	11.4	18.3	Route 30 – Framingham, Cochituate, Westboro	
Middlesex	Marlborough	14.5	23.3	US 20 to I-495 – Northboro, Worcester, Sudbury, Boston	
Middlesex	Hudson	16.9	27.2	To I-290 west / I-495 – Worcester	Access via Route 85 Connector
Middlesex	Hudson	18.1	29.1	Route 62 east (Main Street) – Stow, Maynard	Roundabout; south end of Route 62 overlap
Middlesex	Hudson	18.105	29.137	Route 62 west (Central Street) to I-495 – Berlin, Clinton	North end of Route 62 overlap
Worcester	Bolton	21.0	33.8	Route 117 (Main Street) – Bolton, Lancaster, Stow	Northern terminus
1.000 mi = 1.609 km; 1.000 km = 0.621 mi: Concurrency terminus
