= Massachusetts Route 30 =

East-west state highway in Massachusetts, US

Route 30
- Route 30 highlighted in red

Route information
- Maintained by MassDOT
- Length: 36.3817 mi (58.5507 km)
- Existed: 1933–present

Major junctions
- West end: Route 122 / Route 140 in Grafton
- Route 135 in Westborough; Route 9 in Westborough; Route 85 in Southborough; Route 9 in Framingham; Route 126 in Framingham; I-90 Toll / Mass Pike in Framingham; Route 27 in Wayland; I-90 Toll / Mass Pike / I-95 / Route 128 in Weston; Route 16 in Newton
- East end: US 20 in Boston

Location
- Country: United States
- State: Massachusetts
- Counties: Worcester, Middlesex, Suffolk

Highway system
- Massachusetts State Highway System; Interstate; US; State
← Route 28	→ Route 31

Route 30 is a 36.3817-mile-long (58.5507 km) east–west arterial route, connecting Grafton with Packard's Corner in Boston. Route 30 runs roughly parallel to the Massachusetts Turnpike and Route 9, but unlike those two larger highways, takes a more meandering path from town to town. Between Boston and the Charles River it is known as Commonwealth Avenue, along most of this route is part of the course of the Boston Marathon.

Route 30 has two interchanges with the Mass Pike, at Exits 13 in Framingham and 14/15 in Weston; the latter also includes the junction with Interstate 95 (Route 128). It also has two interchanges with Route 9, one in Westborough and one at the Southborough-Framingham border (where the two highways have an interchange without actually crossing), as well as a section further east in Framingham that runs concurrently with Route 9, for a total of four junctions between Routes 9 and 30.

== Route description ==
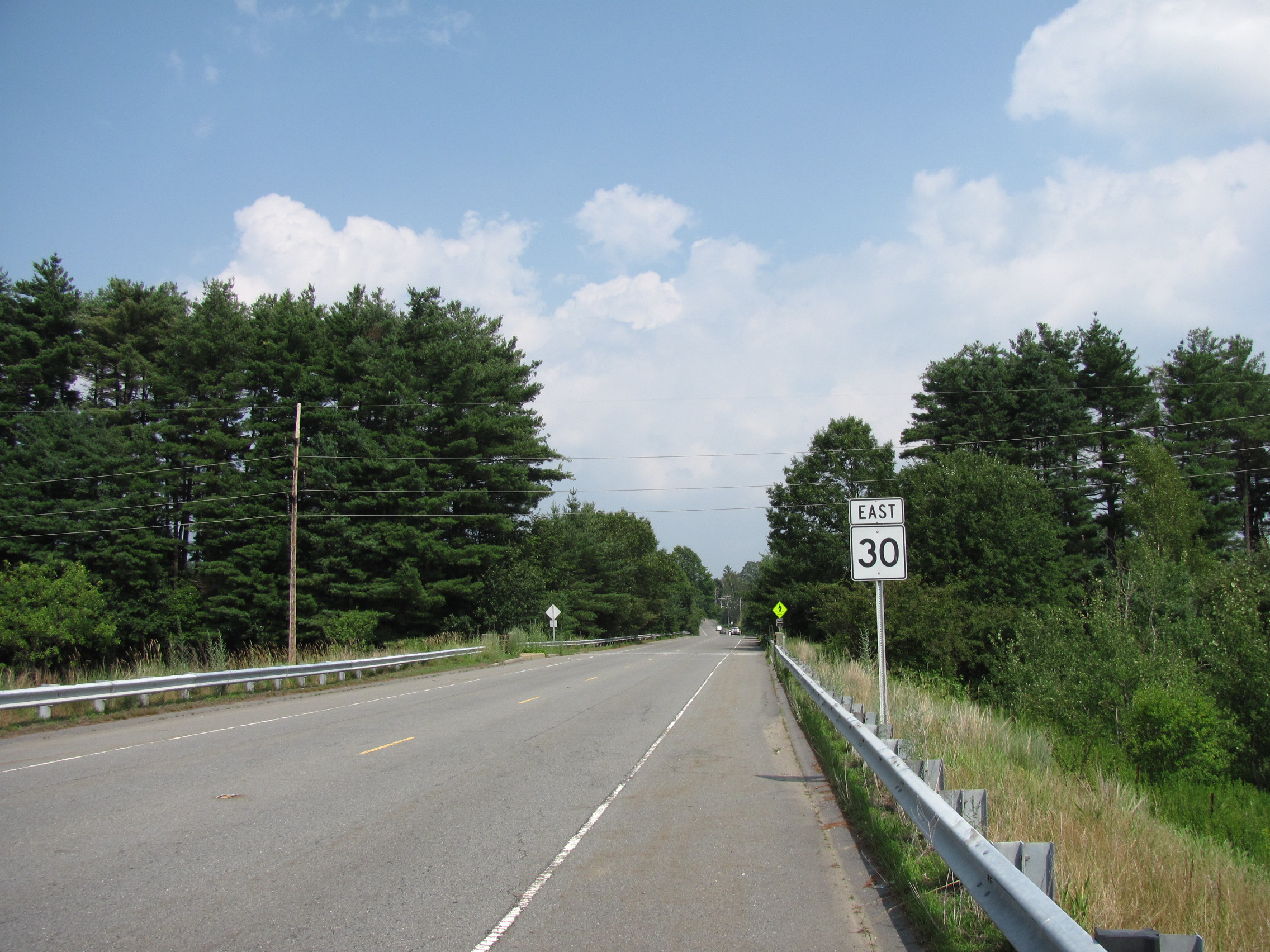
Eastbound in Southborough 42°18′26.7″N 71°33′31.9″W

=== Western end (North Grafton – Framingham) ===
Route 30 begins in North Grafton at Route 122, where it shares a roadway briefly with Route 140. The route travels northeast, passing the Tufts University Cummings School of Veterinary Medicine. The road continues into Westborough, where it crosses Route 135 at a rotary and interchanges with Route 9 to the northeast. After crossing Route 9, Route 30 turns eastward, crossing underneath Interstate 495 without an interchange. The route continues east into Southborough, where it crosses Route 85. Route 30 interchanges once again with Route 9 (without actually crossing it) and continues to parallel the highway into Framingham.

=== Route 9 concurrency and interchanges (Framingham – Weston) ===
In Framingham, Route 30 joins Route 9 in an approximately one-mile concurrency, and leaves via an interchange with Route 126 (heading eastward, there is a very brief concurrency between routes 30 and 126; heading westward, Route 30 joins Route 9 one block west of the Route 126 interchange). Route 30 continues to the northeast and interchanges with the Massachusetts Turnpike. Route 30 continues northeast, crossing over the Mass. Pike, and very briefly entering Natick before entering Wayland. In Wayland, Route 30 crosses Route 27 and continues northeast, very closely paralleling the Mass Pike. Route 30 continues into Weston, where it enters a large interchange with the Mass. Pike and Interstate 95 (Route 128).

=== Eastern end as Commonwealth Ave (Newton – Boston) ===
Upon crossing over I-95 and the Charles River, there is a drastic change in scenery as one crosses from Boston's suburbs to the metropolitan area. With this, Route 30 enters Newton, crossing over the Mass Pike again and then crossing Route 16. Route 30 winds to the east, passing Boston College in Chestnut Hill and entering the Boston neighborhood of Brighton. Route 30 ends approximately 2 miles (3.2 km) west of Route 2 at U.S. Route 20, which provides access to Kenmore Square and Downtown Boston.

== Major intersections ==
County	Location	mi	km	Destinations	Notes
Worcester	Grafton	0.0	0.0	Route 122 / Route 140 south to I-90 Toll / Mass Pike – Worcester, Uxbridge, Grafton	Western terminus; western end of Route 140 concurrency and To US 20, Route 146 and Route 122A
Worcester	Grafton	0.3	0.48	Route 140 north – Shrewsbury, Westminster	Eastern end of Route 140 concurrency
Worcester	Westborough	6.3	10.1	Route 135 – Hopkinton, Framingham, Northborough, Worcester	Roundabout
Worcester	Westborough	7.7	12.4	Route 9 – Worcester, Amherst, Framingham, Boston	Interchange / To Interstate 495 via Route 9 east
Worcester	Southborough	11.9	19.2	Route 85 – Marlboro, Hopkinton	
Worcester	Southborough			To Route 9 – Worcester, Boston	Access via Pleasant Street Connector
Middlesex	Framingham	17.9	28.8	Route 9 west – Shrewsbury, Worcester	Interchange; western end of Route 9 concurrency
Middlesex	Framingham	18.8	30.3	Route 9 east – Natick, Boston	Eastern end of Route 9 concurrency westbound; Route 30 eastbound and westbound split paths
Middlesex	Framingham	19.1	30.7	Route 9 east – Natick, Boston	Eastern end of Route 9 concurrency eastbound
Middlesex	Framingham	19.2	30.9	Route 126 south – Framingham, Ashland	Western end of Route 126 concurrency eastbound
Middlesex	Framingham	19.6	31.5	Route 126 north – Wayland, Concord	Eastern end of Route 126 concurrency eastbound
Middlesex	Framingham	20.5	33.0	I-90 Toll / Mass Pike – Springfield, Boston	Exit 117 on I-90 / Mass Pike
Middlesex	Wayland	22.1	35.6	Route 27 – Cochituate, Concord, Natick, Sherborn	
Middlesex	Weston			To I-90 Toll east / Mass Pike east	Access via Park Road
Middlesex	Weston	27.9	44.9	I-90 Toll / Mass Pike / I-95 (Route 128) – Boston, Albany, NY, Providence, RI, Portsmouth, NH	Exit 123B on I-90 / Mass Pike; exit 39A on I-95
Charles River		28.1	45.2	Bridge	
Middlesex	Newton	29.7	47.8	Route 16 – West Newton, Watertown, Wellesley, Natick	
Suffolk	Boston	36.4	58.6	US 20 east (Commonwealth Avenue) to Route 2	Eastern terminus; Packard's Corner
1.000 mi = 1.609 km; 1.000 km = 0.621 mi: Concurrency terminus; Electronic toll collection; Incomplete access
