= Massachusetts Route 126 =

North-south state highway in Massachusetts, US

Route 126
- Route 126 highlighted in red

Route information
- Maintained by MassDOT
- Length: 33.5704 mi (54.0263 km)

Major junctions
- South end: Route 126 in Woonsocket, RI
- Route 140 / I-495 in Bellingham; Route 9 in Framingham; US 20 in Wayland
- North end: Route 2 / Route 2A in Concord

Location
- Country: United States
- State: Massachusetts
- Counties: Worcester, Norfolk, Middlesex

Highway system
- Massachusetts State Highway System; Interstate; US; State
← Route 125	→ Route 127

Route 126 is a 33.5704-mile-long (54.0263 km) north–south state highway in Massachusetts. Its southern terminus is a continuation of Rhode Island Route 126 by Woonsocket, Rhode Island and its northern terminus is at Route 2 and Route 2A in Concord. Along the way it intersects several major routes including Interstate 495 (I-495) in Bellingham, Route 9 in Framingham, and U.S. Route 20 (US 20) in Wayland.

== Route description ==
Route 126 begins at the Rhode Island state line, continuing into Woonsocket as Rhode Island Route 126. After a short stretch in the town of Blackstone and Worcester County, Route 126 enters the town of Bellingham and Norfolk County, heading north. In Bellingham, Route 126 has a short concurrency with Route 140 at the center of town. In the north of the town, the route turns east on Hartford Avenue, crossing I-495 at Exit 46. Shortly after entering the town of Medway, the route turns north again, crossing Route 109 shortly after that. Route 126 then enters Holliston, in Middlesex County.

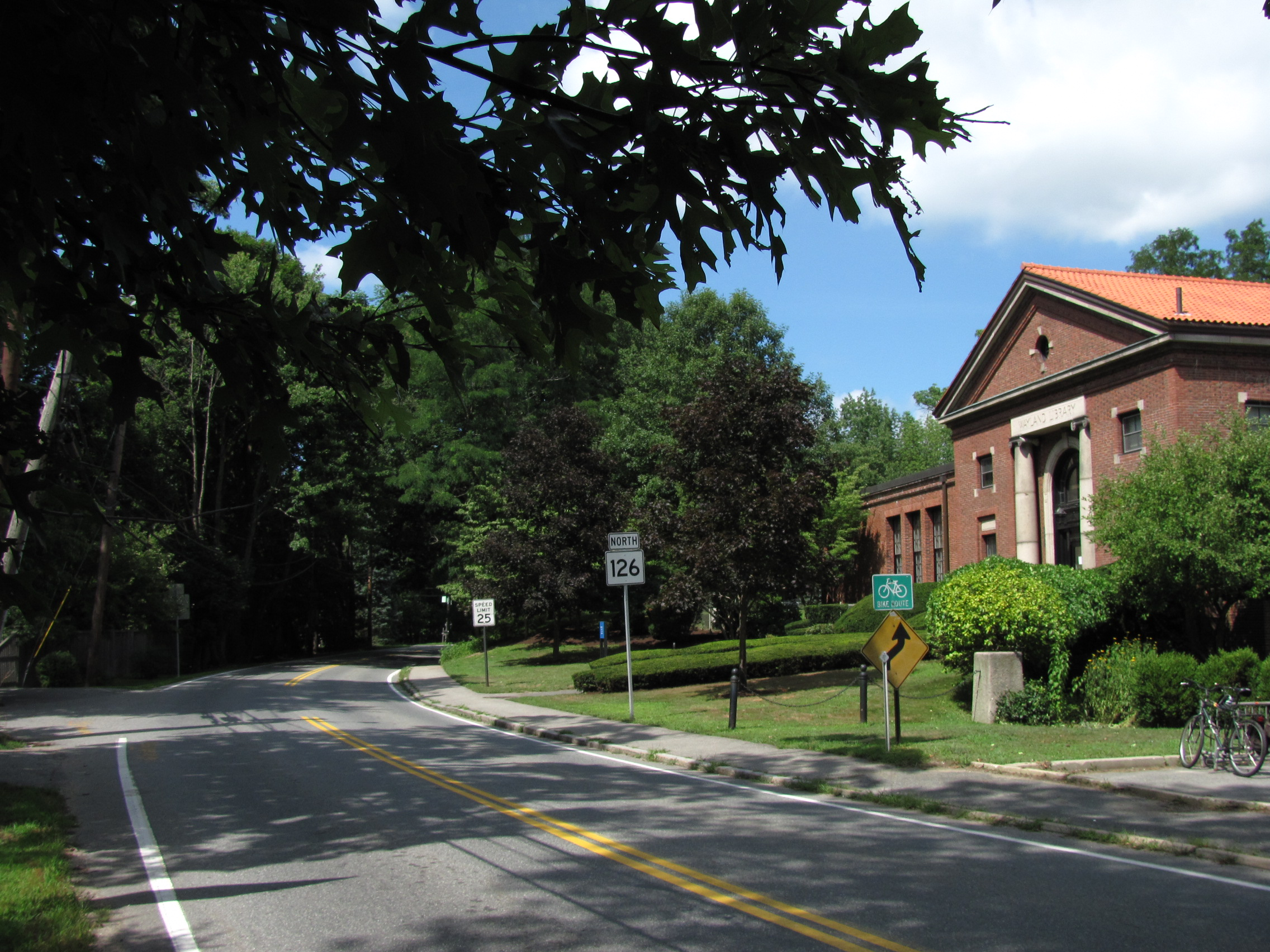
Route 126 northbound in Wayland

In Holliston, Route 126 shares a 2.3 miles (3.7 km) long concurrency with Route 16 through the center of town. After splitting from Route 16, Route 126 heads north into Ashland, passing through the eastern side of town before entering Framingham. The route passes Waushakam Pond before crossing Route 135 near the center of town, next to the Framingham MBTA station. The road bears to the right, passing Gleason Pond before crossing over Route 9 with exit ramps between the two. At this point, Route 30 eastbound joins Route 126 for a short stretch before meeting Route 30 westbound. Route 126 continues northward, crossing the Massachusetts Turnpike (I-90) without junction. (The nearest exit along the Pike is on Route 30 to the east.)

As it passes Lake Cochituate, Route 126 enters the town of Wayland. The route then joins Route 27 for a mile, crossing U.S. Route 20 together just before the two routes split. Route 126 then enters the town of Lincoln. After crossing Route 117, the route continues north, crossing the Fitchburg Line before entering Concord. As the route rounds the banks of Walden Pond through the State Reservation, it finally ends at Routes 2 and 2A next to Concord-Carlisle Regional High School.

== Major intersections ==
County	Location	mi	km	Destinations	Notes
Worcester	Blackstone	0.00	0.00	Route 126 south – Woonsocket	Continuation into Rhode Island
Norfolk	Bellingham	5.40	8.69	Route 140 south – Franklin, Taunton	Southern terminus of concurrency with Route 140
Norfolk	Bellingham	5.48	8.82	Route 140 north – Milford, Worcester	Northern terminus of concurrency with Route 140
Norfolk	Bellingham	7.66	12.33	I-495 (Blue Star Memorial Highway) – Taunton, Cape Cod, Marlboro, Lowell	I-495 Exit 46; partial cloverleaf interchange
Norfolk	Medway	10.30	16.58	Route 109 – Millis, Westwood, Milford, Hopedale, Mendon	
Middlesex	Holliston	12.90	20.76	Route 16 west (Washington Street) – Milford, Uxbridge	Western terminus of concurrency with Route 16
Middlesex	Holliston	15.20	24.46	Route 16 east (Washington Street) – Sherborn, Wellesley	Eastern terminus of concurrency with Route 16
Middlesex	Framingham	20.00	32.19	Route 135 (Waverly Street) – Hopkinton, Natick	Crossing point for the Boston Marathon
Middlesex	Framingham	21.60	34.76	Route 9 (Worcester Road) – Natick, Worcester	
Middlesex	Framingham	21.80	35.08	Route 30 (Cochituate Road) to I-90 (Mass Pike) – Wayland, Southborough	To I-90 (Mass Pike) via Route 30 eastbound
Middlesex	Wayland	26.30	42.33	Route 27 south (Cochituate Road) – Natick, Sherborn	Southern terminus of concurrency with Route 27
Middlesex	Wayland	27.30	43.94	US 20 (Boston Post Road) – Marlboro, Boston	
Middlesex	Wayland	27.40	44.10	Route 27 north (Old Sudbury Road) – Sudbury, Maynard	Northern end of concurrency with Route 27
Middlesex	Lincoln	31.30	50.37	Route 117 (South Great Road) – Waltham, Bolton	
Middlesex	Concord	33.57	54.03	Route 2 / Route 2A to Route 119 west / Route 111 north – Cambridge, Boston, Ayer, Fitchburg / Walden Street	Northern terminus; to Route 119 & Route 111 via Route 2 west; Walden Street continues north to Route 62
Middlesex	1.000 mi = 1.609 km; 1.000 km = 0.621 mi: Concurrency terminus				
