= Massachusetts Route 148 =

State highway in Worcester County, Massachusetts, US

Route 148
- Route 148 highlighted in red

Route information
- Maintained by MassDOT
- Length: 19.68 mi (31.67 km)

Major junctions
- South end: US 20 in Sturbridge
- Route 9 in Brookfield; Route 67 in North Brookfield
- North end: Route 122 in Oakham

Location
- Country: United States
- State: Massachusetts
- Counties: Worcester

Highway system
- Massachusetts State Highway System; Interstate; US; State
← Route 147	→ Route 149

Route 148 is a 19.68-mile-long (31.67 km) south–north state highway in central Massachusetts. The road travels between U.S. Route 20 (US 20) in Sturbridge and Route 122 in Oakham. It travels entirely in Worcester County.

== Route description ==
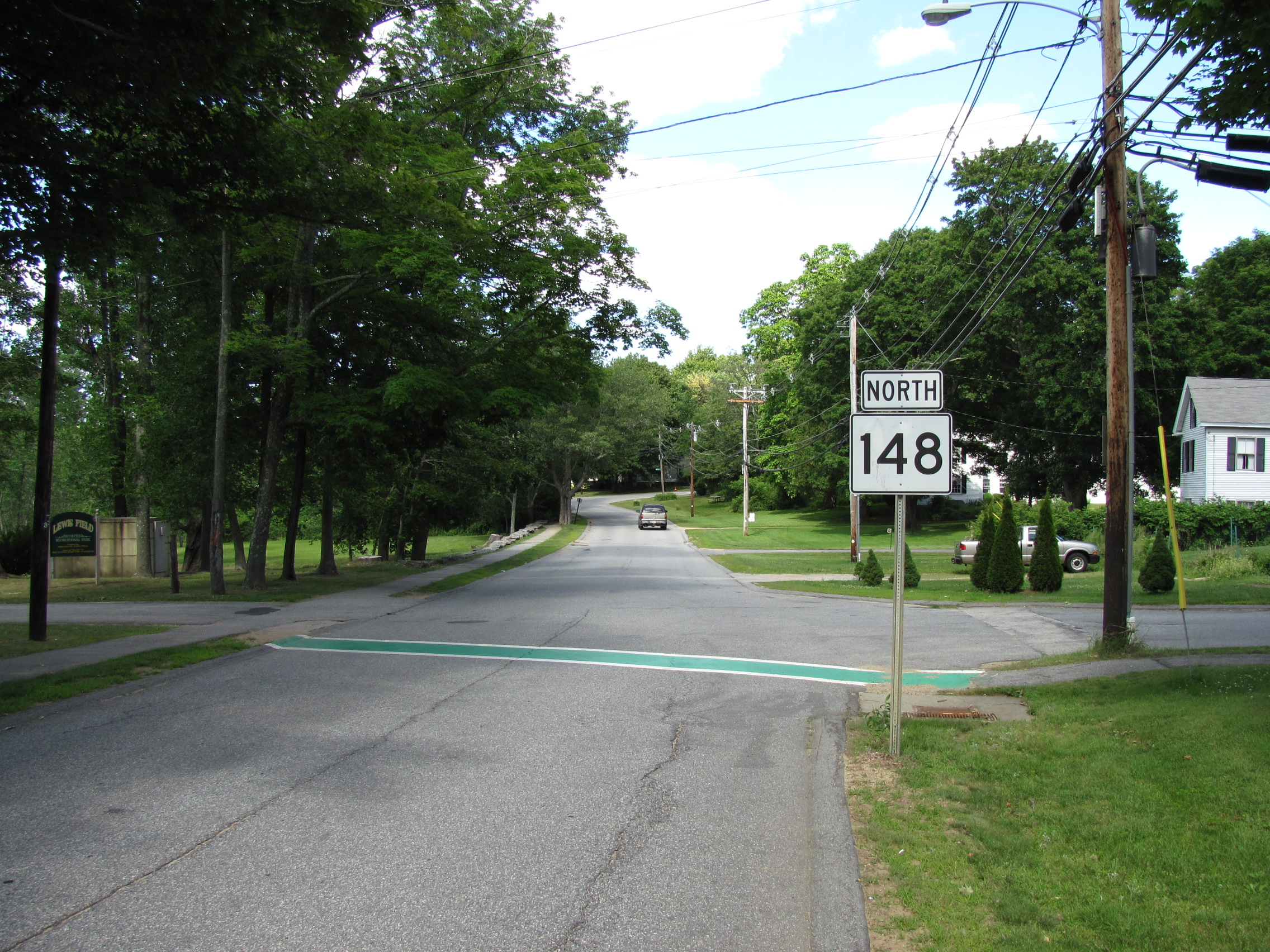
Northbound in Brookfield

Route 148 begins at US 20 in Fiskdale, a village in Sturbridge. The highway runs north under Interstate 90 (the Massachusetts Turnpike) without an interchange and past the Tantasqua Regional High School before entering Brookfield, where there is a very brief concurrency with Route 9 in the center of the town. Route 148 then enters North Brookfield and becomes concurrent with Route 67 through the center of the town. After the two highways diverge, Route 148 passes through the southeastern corner of New Braintree for less than one-half-mile (0.80 km) and then enters Oakham, where the highway ends at Route 122.

== History ==
Route 148 was extended after 1986 from the southern intersection with Route 67 in North Brookfield to Route 122 in Oakham; however, signage for the highway north of Route 67 is very spotty.

== Major intersections ==
The entire route is in Worcester County.

Location	mi	km	Destinations	Notes
Sturbridge	0.00	0.00	US 20 (Main Street) – Old Sturbridge Village, Charlton, Brimfield	Southern terminus
Brookfield	7.60	12.23	Route 9 west (West Main Street)	Western terminus of Route 9/148 concurrency
Brookfield	7.64	12.30	Route 9 east (Post Road) – Spencer	Eastern terminus of Route 9/148 concurrency
North Brookfield	10.60	17.06	Route 67 south (West Brookfield Road) – West Brookfield	Southern terminus of Route 67/148 concurrency
North Brookfield	12.30	19.79	Route 67 north (New Braintree Road) – New Braintree	Northern terminus of Route 67/148 concurrency
Oakham	19.70	31.70	Route 122 (Worcester Road) – Barre, Paxton	Northern terminus
1.000 mi = 1.609 km; 1.000 km = 0.621 mi: Closed/former; Concurrency terminus
