= Interstate 291 (Massachusetts) =

Highway in Massachusetts

Interstate 291
- Springfield Expressway
- I-291 highlighted in red

Route information
- Auxiliary route of I-91
- Maintained by MassDOT
- Length: 5.44 mi (8.75 km)
- Existed: 1971–present
- NHS: Entire route

Major junctions
- West end: I-91 / US 20 in Springfield
- US 20 / Route 20A in Springfield
- East end: I-90 / Mass Pike in Chicopee

Location
- Country: United States
- State: Massachusetts
- Counties: Hampden

Highway system
- Interstate Highway System; Main; Auxiliary; Suffixed; Business; Future; Massachusetts State Highway System; Interstate; US; State
← I-290	→ I-295

Interstate 291 (I-291), also known as the Springfield Expressway, is a 5.44-mile (8.75 km) auxiliary Interstate Highway in Massachusetts that links I-91 in Downtown Springfield with I-90 (Massachusetts Turnpike) in Chicopee. I-291 is roughly a northeast–southwest highway. It merges with I-91 at its southwestern terminus, via a flyover. The road meets the turnpike at its northeastern terminus. Getting onto the turnpike from I-291 is straightforward, but getting from the turnpike to I-291 requires a left turn at an at-grade traffic signal. I-291 travels directly through highly populated areas of Springfield and passes under several overpasses. From its southwestern terminus to exit 5A, I-291 is concurrent with US Route 20 (US 20).

I-291 is only 22.4 miles (36.0 km) from Interstate 291 in Connecticut, and there are no intervening Interstate Highway interchanges between them.

== Route description ==
I-291 begins as a spur of I-91 at exit 6 in Springfield, concurrent with US 20, which merges from the north. The two entry ramps from I-91 merge with each other after exits 2A and 2B, where a sign for the beginning of I-291 east is posted. I-291 and US 20 run eastbound concurrently until exit 5A (US 20 joins westbound at exit 5), where US 20 east leaves the highway for a junction with Route 20A. I-291 continues east into Chicopee, where it intersects the Massachusetts Turnpike (I-90). I-291 ends at an odd intersection at a stoplight, where it continues as Burnett Road, but I-291 east traffic can exit uninterrupted by way of a ramp to the turnpike. However, drivers coming from the turnpike must deal with this traffic light, as a left turn across the intersection is required to get on I-291 west.

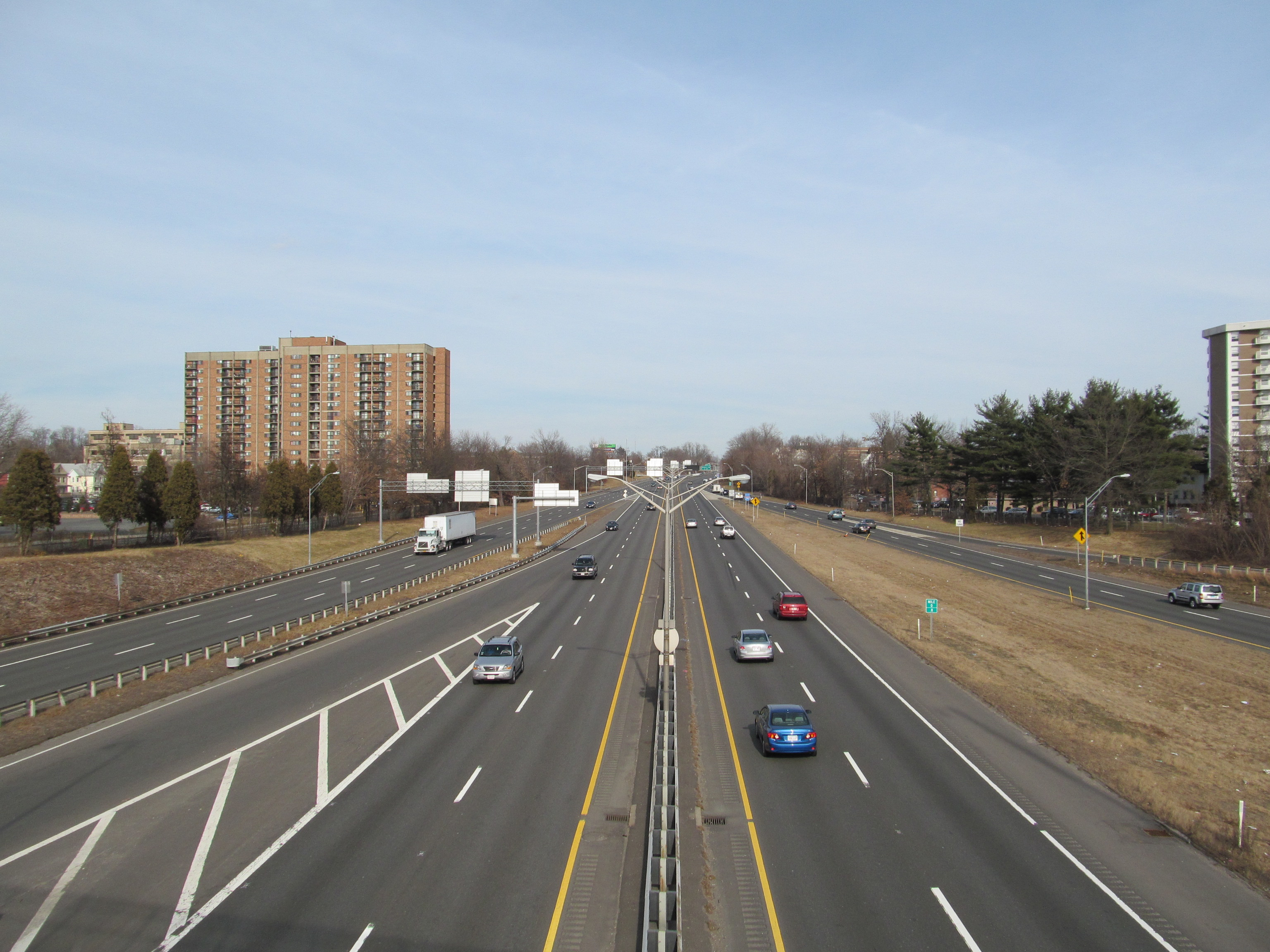
I-291 eastbound

The westbound interchange with I-91 is unusual in that the ramps for exits 1A and 1B split before the ramps for exits 2A and 2B do. Traffic bound for exit 2A (Chestnut Street) must first take the ramp for exit 1A (I-91 south), and traffic bound for exit 2B (Dwight Street) must first take the ramp for exit 1B (I-91 north).

Traffic bound for US 20 west from I-291 takes exit 1B. US 20 does not actually join with I-91, but rather this exit splits, left for the onramp to I-91 north, the right to continue on the US 20 access ramp.

== History ==
I-291 was originally conceived in 1953, prior to the creation of the Interstate Highway System, as the Springfield Expressway, which would bypass US 20 and connect to the US 5 expressway (now I-91) and the proposed Massachusetts Turnpike. I-291 follows the original planned alignment of the expressway, except for the stretch between exit 4 (St. James Avenue) and exit 5 (US 20/Route 20A/Page Boulevard). The original planned alignment had the route turn in almost a perfect 90-degree angle onto Roosevelt Avenue, but industrial development (including the relocation of Smith & Wesson's corporate headquarters) had the highway turn more gently. The first section of the expressway that was built was the bridge over the Chicopee River. The first section of the expressway that opened was from US 20/Route 20A to I-90 (Massachusetts Turnpike) in 1957; work on the freeway started up again in 1967, and the entire highway was completed in 1971. The construction delay was due to I-91 having priority through western Massachusetts.

== Exit list ==
All interchanges were to be renumbered to mileage-based numbers under a project scheduled to start in 2016. However, this project was indefinitely postponed. On November 18, 2019, the Massachusetts Department of Transportation announced that I-291's exit numbers would not be changed because its exits were so tightly spaced.

The entire route is in Hampden County.

Location	mi	km	Exit	Destinations	Notes
Springfield	0.000	0.000	1	I-91 / US 20 west – Hartford, CT, West Springfield	Western terminus; signed as exits 1A (south) and 1B (north); western end of US 20 concurrency
Springfield	0.463– 0.589	0.745– 0.948	2	Dwight Street / Chestnut Street	Signed as exits 2B (Dwight) and 2A (Chestnut)
Springfield	1.340	2.157	3	Armory Street	
Springfield	2.410	3.879	4	St. James Avenue – Chicopee Falls	
Springfield	4.046– 4.057	6.511– 6.529	5	US 20 east / Route 20A west – Indian Orchard, East Springfield	Signed as exits 5A (east) and 5B (west) northbound; eastern end of US 20 concurrency
Chicopee	5.027	8.090	6	Fuller Road – Ludlow, Chicopee Falls	
Chicopee	5.44	8.75	7	I-90 / Mass Pike – Boston, Albany, NY	Northern terminus; exit 51 on I-90 / Mass Pike
1.000 mi = 1.609 km; 1.000 km = 0.621 mi: Concurrency terminus; Incomplete access
