= Brookfield (CDP), Massachusetts =

Brookfield, Massachusetts
- Census-designated place
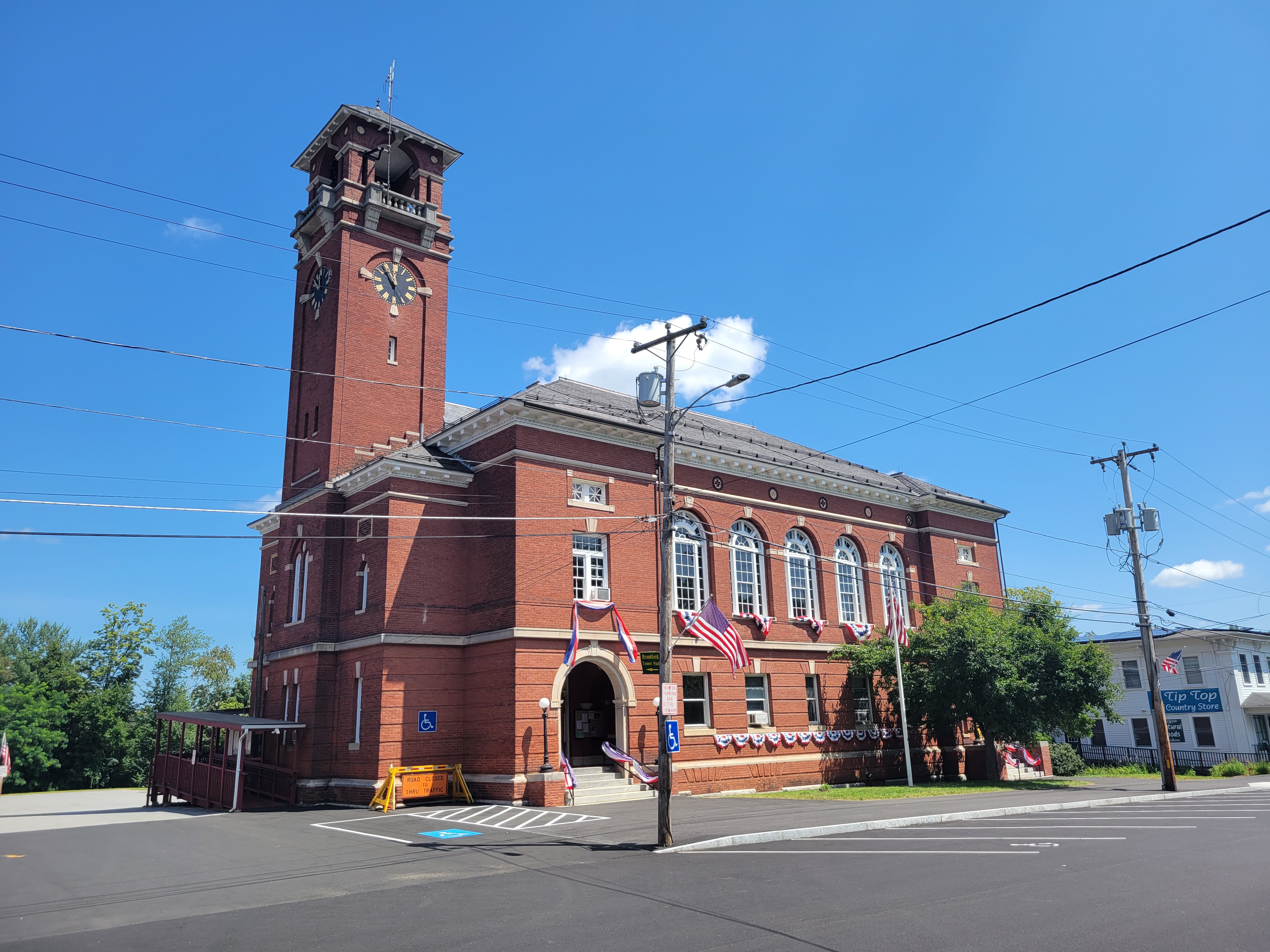
- Town Hall

- Location within Massachusetts Location within the United States
- Coordinates: 42°12′58″N 72°6′10″W
- Country: United States
- State: Massachusetts
- County: Worcester
- Town: Brookfield

Area
  - Total: 1.15 sq mi (2.98 km^{2})
  - Land: 1.15 sq mi (2.98 km^{2})
  - Water: 0 sq mi (0.00 km^{2})
- Elevation: 696 ft (212 m)

Population (2020)
  - Total: 824
  - Density: 715.1/sq mi (276.09/km^{2})
- Time zone: UTC-5 (Eastern (EST))
  - Summer (DST): UTC-4 (EDT)
- ZIP Code: 01506
- Area codes: 508/774
- FIPS code: 25-09070
- GNIS feature ID: 2630524

Brookfield is a census-designated place (CDP) comprising the main village in the town of Brookfield, Worcester County, Massachusetts, United States. Massachusetts Route 9 passes through the center of the village, leading east 6 miles (10 km) to Spencer and west 9 miles (14 km) to Ware. Massachusetts Route 148 crosses Route 9 in the village center, leading north 4 miles (6 km) to North Brookfield and south 7 miles (11 km) to Fiskdale.

Brookfield was first listed as a CDP after the 2010 census.

== Demographics ==
Historical population
Census	Pop.	Note	%±
2020	824		—
U.S. Decennial Census
