= Interstate 84 in Massachusetts =

Highway in Massachusetts

Interstate 84
- Wilbur Cross Highway
- I-84 highlighted in red

Route information
- Maintained by MassDOT
- Length: 8.15 mi (13.12 km)
- Existed: 1958–present
- History: Route 15 (1948–1980); I-84 (1958–1971, 1984–present); I-86 (1971–1984)
- NHS: Entire route

Major junctions
- West end: I-84 at the Connecticut state line in Union, CT
- US 20 in Sturbridge
- East end: I-90 Toll / Mass Pike in Sturbridge

Location
- Country: United States
- State: Massachusetts
- Counties: Hampden, Worcester

Highway system
- Interstate Highway System; Main; Auxiliary; Suffixed; Business; Future; Massachusetts State Highway System; Interstate; US; State
| ← Route 83 | → Route 85 |
| ← Route 85 | I-86 | → Route 86 |
| ← Route 14 | Route 15 | → Route 15 |

Interstate 84 (I-84) in Massachusetts is the easternmost segment of the eastern I-84 freeway originating in Dunmore, Pennsylvania, near Scranton. Within Massachusetts, I-84 exists in the towns of Holland and Sturbridge. Known as the Wilbur Cross Highway, it has also been signed as Route 15 between 1948 and 1980 as well as Interstate 86 (I-86) between 1971 and 1984. The Massachusetts segment of I-84 is the shortest state length of the four states it travels through.

== Route description ==
The Wilbur Cross Highway continues on I-84 after the highway enters Massachusetts. For a short distance (approximately 90 yards (82 m) eastbound and 200 yards (180 m) westbound), the Interstate passes through the town of Holland in Hampden County before crossing into Sturbridge in Worcester County for the remainder of its length. I-84 has only three exits in Massachusetts, one of them being a major road, which is U.S. Route 20. The road then ends at I-90, the Massachusetts Turnpike. I-84 ends at I-90, which is located in Sturbridge. The length of I-84 in Massachusetts is 8.15 miles (13.12 km), making the Massachusetts section of I-84 the shortest distance within any of the four states it traverses.

== History ==
=== Origins ===
The highway originated as Route 15, an extension of Connecticut Route 15 (then known as the Wilbur Cross Highway). The extension started in Holland, and, within 1/4 mile (0.40 km), it entered Sturbridge as Mashapaug Road. It then followed Haynes Road to Sturbridge Center ending at Route 131.

=== Upgrade to Interstate Highway ===
Between 1949 and 1952, the Massachusetts Department of Public Works (MassDPW) initiated construction of the Wilbur Cross Highway extension to US Route 20 (US 20) in Sturbridge, with two lanes in each direction separated by a wide median and frequent U-turns.

Between 1955 and 1957, an extension was created to connect Route 15 to the new Massachusetts Turnpike, which opened on May 15, 1957. In 1958, I-84 was cosigned with Route 15 north and east of East Hartford, Connecticut, into Massachusetts.

In late 1968, the Federal Highway Administration (FHWA) approved a new Interstate connection from Hartford, Connecticut, to Providence, Rhode Island, which was to become part of a rerouted I-84. As a result, the existing section of I-84 from Manchester, Connecticut, to I-90 (overlapping Route 15) was redesignated I-86.

Shortly thereafter, MassDPW embarked on a reconstruction of its portion of the highway with new and reconstructed carriageways providing three 12-foot-wide (3.7 m) lanes and standard shoulders. Both carriageways were separated by a wide, forested variable median. New bridges, interchanges, and weigh stations were erected along the route. The $20-million (equivalent to $108 million in 2024) reconstruction project was completed in 1973. (Similar improvements in Connecticut were not completed until the 1980s.)

On October 1, 1980, the Connecticut Department of Transportation (CTDOT) decided to truncate Route 15 back to I-84 exit 64A (where it ends today), eliminating the overlap with I-86. Simultaneously, Massachusetts eliminated the overlap by decommissioning its Route 15 entirely.

=== Redesignation ===
When the planned portion of I-84 toward Providence ran into opposition in Rhode Island and was canceled in 1983, I-86 was officially reverted to I-84. The I-86 numbering was officially deleted on December 12, 1984. Plans to connect I-84 along the present day I-384/US 6 corridor from Hartford to Providence were scuttled for environmental reasons. As a result, I-84 was rerouted back onto the completed I-86 freeway.

== Exit list ==
The Massachusetts Department of Transportation (MassDOT) planned to convert I-84, along with the rest of the state's Interstates, to use milepost-based exits during 2016; however, this project was indefinitely postponed until November 18, 2019, when MassDOT confirmed that beginning in late summer 2020 the exit renumbering project will begin. On February 10, 2021, MassDOT announced in a blog post that the exit renumbering on I-84 will begin on February 28 and last for a week.

| County | Location | mi | km | Old exit | New exit | Destinations | Notes |
|---|---|---|---|---|---|---|---|
| Hampden | Holland | 0.000 | 0.000 | | | I-84 west (Wilbur Cross Highway) – Hartford | Continuation into Connecticut; former I-86 |
| Worcester | Sturbridge | 0.289 | 0.465 | | | Haynes Street | Westbound entrance only |
| Worcester | Sturbridge | 3.252 | 5.234 | 1 | 3 | Mashapaug Road – Southbridge, Sturbridge | Access via Haynes Street |
| Worcester | Sturbridge | 5.077 | 8.171 | 2 | 5 | To Route 131 – Sturbridge, Southbridge | Access via Haynes Street |
| Worcester | Sturbridge | 6.550– 6.869 | 10.541– 11.055 | 3 | 6 | US 20 – Charlton, Palmer | Signed as exits 6A (US 20 east) and 6B (US 20 west); last eastbound exit before toll |
| Worcester | Sturbridge | 7.710 | 12.408 | | | I-90 Toll / Mass Pike – Worcester, Boston, Springfield, Albany, NY | Eastern terminus; exit 78 on I-90 / Mass Pike |
1.000 mi = 1.609 km; 1.000 km = 0.621 mi: Electronic toll collection; Incomplete access

== See also ==
Interstate 84
| Previous state: Connecticut | Massachusetts | Next state: Terminus |
