= Lenox Dale, Massachusetts =

Village in Massachusetts, United States

Coordinates: 42°20′10″N 73°14′43″W

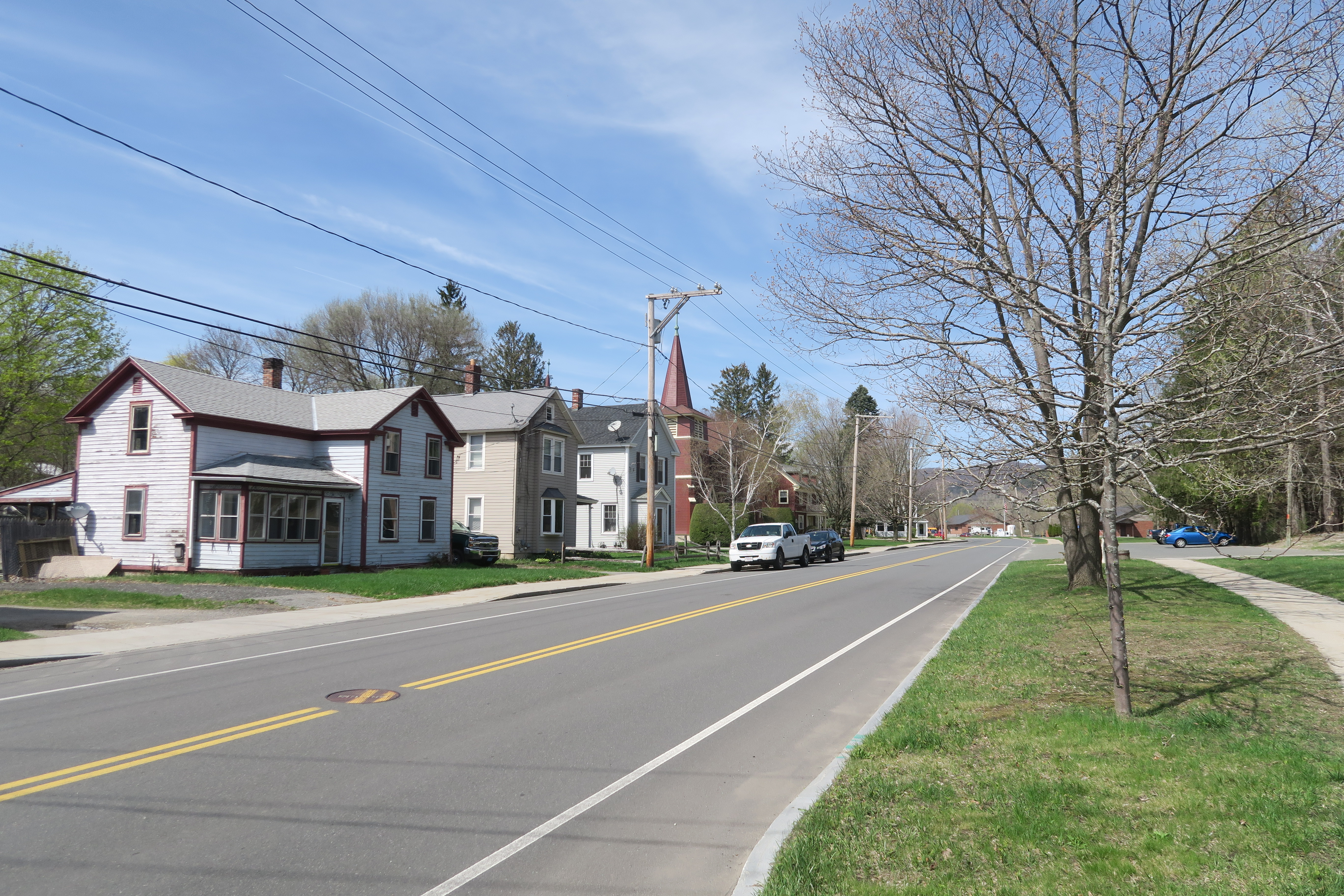
Crystal Street

Lenox Dale is a village in Lenox, Berkshire County, Massachusetts, United States at the border of the town of Lee, along the Housatonic River. It is a small village, but a village nonetheless with its own post office (zip code 01242), school, two stores, and Catholic church. It has a large apartment next to a baseball Field. The main street in the town is Crystal Street. Crystal street got its name for the large amounts of crystals found in the area. In the earlier times, it depended upon the river to provide power for its paper mills. More recently, the largest employer was Lenox Machine Company, which made paper industry equipment. Lenox Machine was acquired by Beloit Corp in 1979, which was acquired by Harnischfeger of Germany, which went bankrupt in 1999. It was then purchased by Groupe Laperrière & Verreault (GLV) of Canada. In April 2019, GLV was purchased by Valmet of Finland and incorporated into the company as their Mill Process Solutions (MPS) Division. There is also a marble quarry on the border with the town of Washington.

In the 1940s and 1950s, Lenox Dale also had a package store, a second church, a Richfield gas station, A Mobil gas station, a Chrysler-Plymouth dealership, a barber shop, a cocker spaniel kennel, two grocery stores, a fire department, a resident constable, an elementary school and a beauty parlor. In earlier years it was called Lenox Furnace as there was a glass manufacturing facility there. In the 1700s and early 1800s Lenoxdale was a prominent spot for German and Scottish hunters. In the early twentieth century, many immigrants from Europe came to the area to work in the glass factories and sometimes in the mines. When the factories began to close down, the majority of the population and business began to leave. A trolley bus link had originally gone to Lenox, but later shut down.
