= Milford Regional Medical Center =

- UMass Memorial Health

- Location within Massachusetts

Geography
- Location: Milford, Massachusetts, United States
- Coordinates: 42.133427°N 71.528164°W

Organization
- Care system: Private
- Type: Community

Services
- Beds: 149

History
- Founded: 1903

Links
- Website: www.milfordregional.org
- Lists: Hospitals in Massachusetts

Milford Regional Medical Center (also known as Milford Regional), is a full-service, community and regional non-profit, teaching hospital located in Milford, Massachusetts. Milford Regional has 149 beds in the main hospital and runs a comprehensive healthcare system that includes the VNA and Hospice of Greater Milford and Tri-County Medical Associates, a physician practice group. The service area for hospital covers 20-plus towns in Worcester, Middlesex, and Norfolk counties.

Milford Regional was acquired by UMass Memorial Health on October 1, 2024.

== Services provided ==
Milford Regional has close to 200 physicians on the active medical staff and an additional 100 courtesy or consulting physicians, patients receive care in multiple specialties.

Milford Regional's patient care center includes eight operating suites, consolidated surgical services (including admitting and pre-admission testing) and a medical/surgical floor with private rooms, many with advanced patient monitoring capabilities. In addition, the Maternity Center has been expanded and updated to include a new nursery that will accommodate 16 bassinets, six new postpartum rooms and the renovation of current maternity rooms, of which three include whirlpool labor tubs.

Milford Regional opened a new $25-million cancer center in January 2007. This building houses comprehensive cancer services in a partnership with Dana-Farber/Brigham and Women's Cancer Center. In 2009, they opened a comprehensive breast health service called The Breast Center.

Milford Regional is affiliated with UMass Memorial Health Care as a major teaching hospital.
