= North Brookfield (CDP), Massachusetts =

North Brookfield, Massachusetts
- CDP
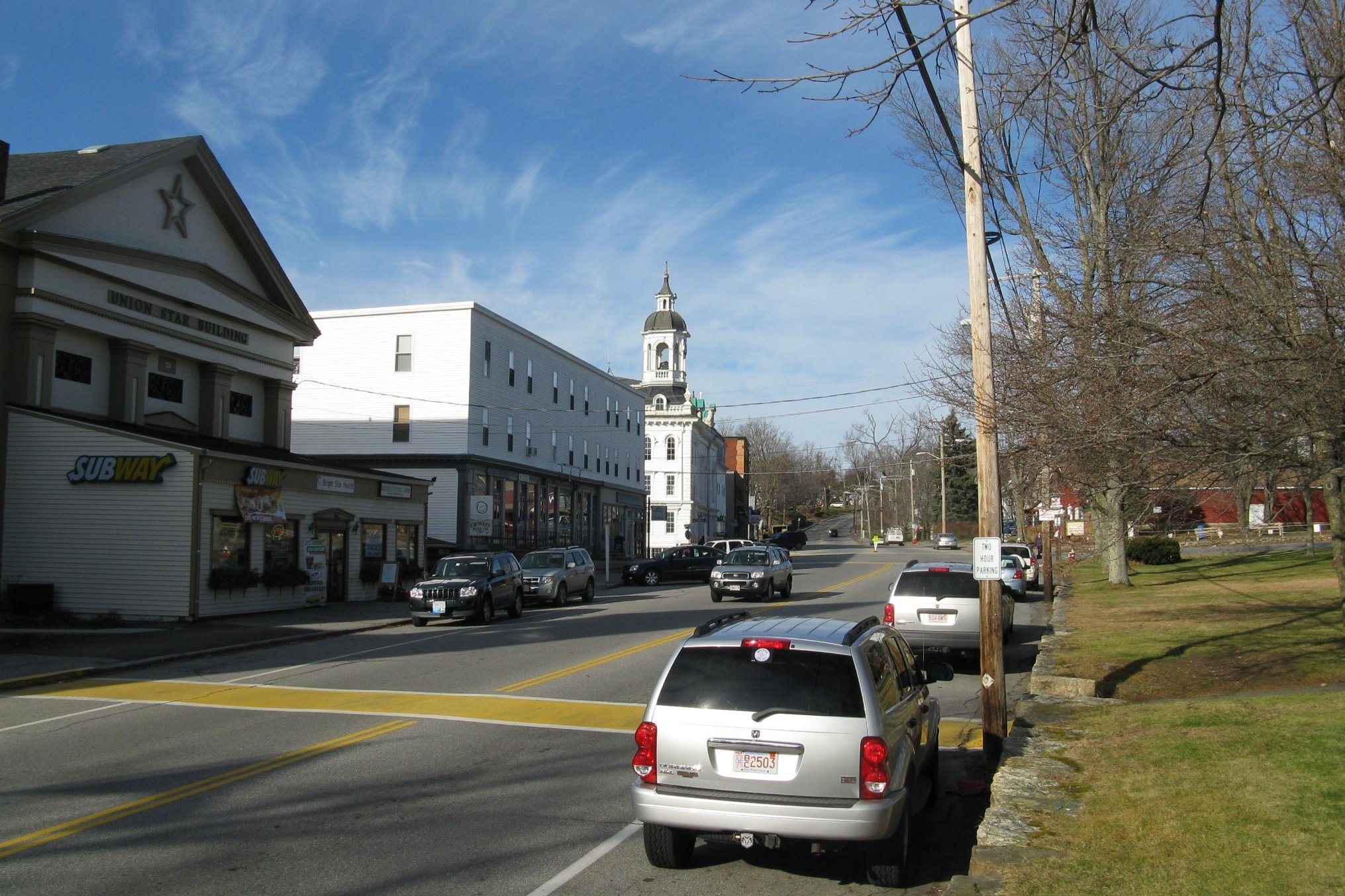
- North Main Street

- Location in Worcester County and the state of Massachusetts.
- Coordinates: 42°16′11″N 72°5′4″W
- Country: United States
- State: Massachusetts
- County: Worcester

Area
  - Total: 1.47 sq mi (3.82 km^{2})
  - Land: 1.47 sq mi (3.82 km^{2})
  - Water: 0 sq mi (0.00 km^{2})
- Elevation: 873 ft (266 m)

Population (2020)
  - Total: 2,256
  - Density: 1,529.0/sq mi (590.34/km^{2})
- Time zone: UTC-5 (Eastern (EST))
  - Summer (DST): UTC-4 (EDT)
- ZIP code: 01535
- Area code: 508
- FIPS code: 25-47100
- GNIS feature ID: 0609951

North Brookfield is a census-designated place (CDP) in the town of North Brookfield in Worcester County, Massachusetts, United States. The population was 2,265 at the 2010 census.

== Geography ==
According to the United States Census Bureau, the CDP has a total area of 3.8 km^{2} (1.5 mi^{2}), all land.

== Demographics ==
Historical population
Census	Pop.	Note	%±
2020	2,256		—
U.S. Decennial Census

As of the census of 2000, there were 2,527 people, 1,054 households, and 643 families residing in the CDP. The population density was 668.3/km^{2} (1,733.3/mi^{2}). There were 1,113 housing units at an average density of 294.3/km^{2} (763.4/mi^{2}). The racial makeup of the CDP was 97.59% White, 0.36% Black or African American, 0.28% Native American, 0.51% from other races, and 1.27% from two or more races. Hispanic or Latino of any race were 1.35% of the population.

There were 1,054 households, out of which 31.8% had children under the age of 18 living with them, 43.6% were married couples living together, 13.3% had a female householder with no husband present, and 38.9% were non-families. 32.5% of all households were made up of individuals, and 14.6% had someone living alone who was 65 years of age or older. The average household size was 2.40 and the average family size was 3.04.

In the CDP, the population was spread out, with 26.8% under the age of 18, 7.3% from 18 to 24, 29.6% from 25 to 44, 21.5% from 45 to 64, and 14.8% who were 65 years of age or older. The median age was 36 years. For every 100 females, there were 91.1 males. For every 100 females age 18 and over, there were 89.3 males.

The median income for a household in the CDP was $39,267, and the median income for a family was $46,563. Males had a median income of $39,911 versus $29,850 for females. The per capita income for the CDP was $18,841. About 7.7% of families and 9.3% of the population were below the poverty line, including 14.2% of those under age 18 and 6.3% of those age 65 or over.
