= Ware (CDP), Massachusetts =

Ware, Massachusetts
- Census-designated place
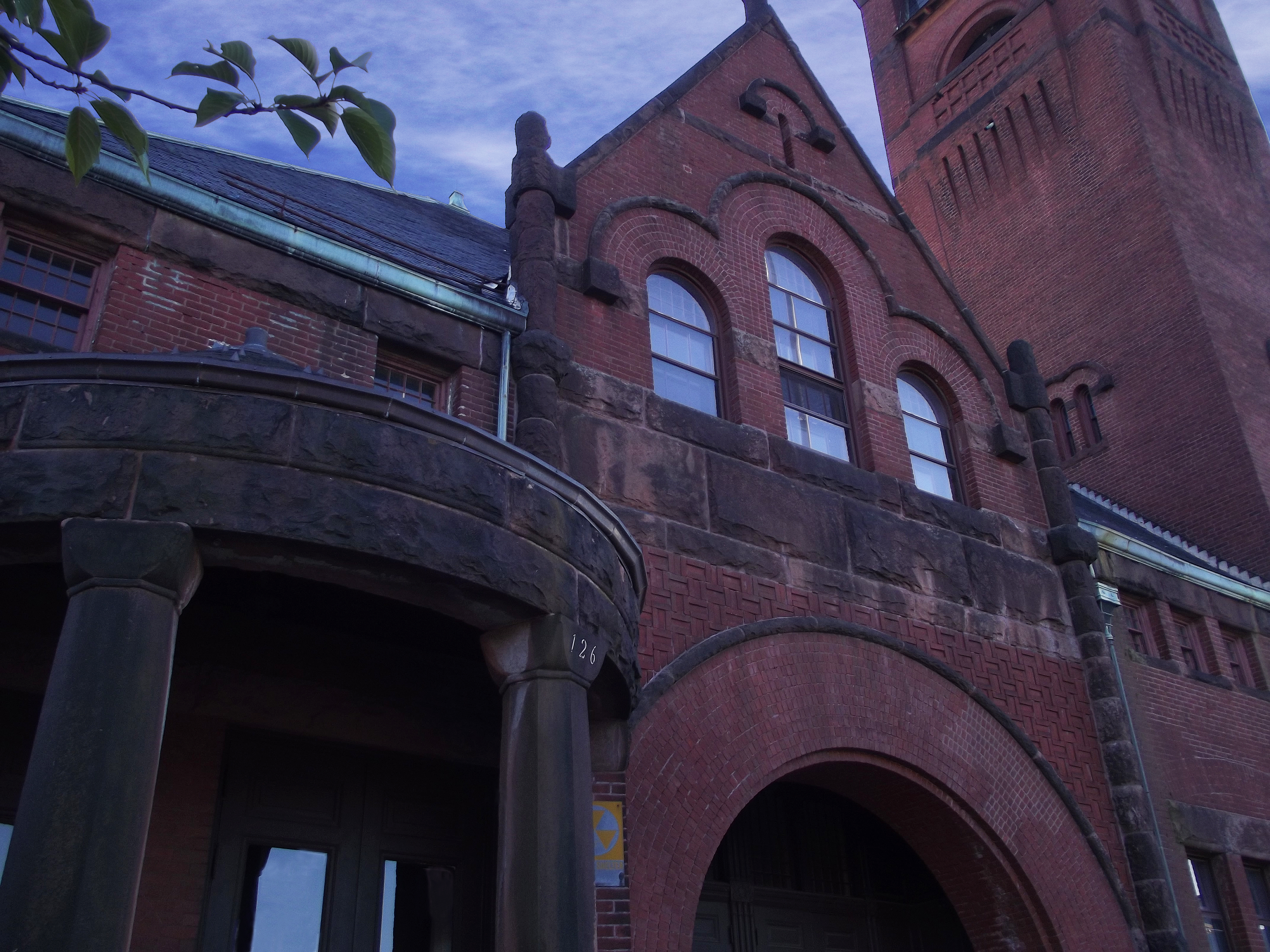
- Ware Town Hall

- Location in Hampshire County in Massachusetts
- Coordinates: 42°15′36″N 72°14′45″W
- Country: United States
- State: Massachusetts
- County: Hampshire
- Town: Ware

Area
  - Total: 6.36 sq mi (16.46 km^{2})
  - Land: 6.22 sq mi (16.11 km^{2})
  - Water: 0.14 sq mi (0.35 km^{2})
- Elevation: 423 ft (129 m)

Population (2020)
  - Total: 6,266
  - Density: 1,007.4/sq mi (388.95/km^{2})
- Time zone: UTC-5 (Eastern (EST))
  - Summer (DST): UTC-4 (EDT)
- ZIP code: 01082
- Area code: 413
- FIPS code: 25-72845
- GNIS feature ID: 0609762

Ware is a census-designated place (CDP) comprising the main village in the town of Ware in Hampshire County, Massachusetts, United States. The population of the CDP was 6,170 at the 2010 census, out of a total town population of 9,872. It is part of the Springfield, Massachusetts Metropolitan Statistical Area.

== Geography ==
The Ware CDP is located in the southeast corner of the town of Ware at 42°15′35″N 72°14′45″W (42.259965, -72.245841). The CDP is bordered by the town of West Brookfield to the east, Warren to the southeast, Palmer to the south, and the rest of the town of Ware to the west and north.

According to the United States Census Bureau, the CDP has a total area of 6.3 square miles (16.4 km^{2}), of which 6.2 square miles (16.0 km^{2}) are land and 0.2 square miles (0.4 km^{2}), or 2.15%, are water. The Ware River flows through the center of the village, running southwest to join the Quaboag River in Palmer, forming the Chicopee River.

Massachusetts Route 9 runs through the center of Ware as Main Street, leading east 27 miles (43 km) to Worcester and northwest 19 miles (31 km) to Amherst. Massachusetts Route 32 joins Route 9 through the center of Ware but follows the Ware River valley, leading northeast 15 miles (24 km) to Barre and southwest 9 miles (14 km) to Palmer.

== Demographics ==
Historical population
Census	Pop.	Note	%±
2020	6,266		—
U.S. Decennial Census

As of the census of 2000, there were 6,174 people, 2,685 households, and 1,592 families residing in the CDP. The population density was 386.4/km^{2} (999.9/mi^{2}). There were 2,906 housing units at an average density of 181.8/km^{2} (470.6/mi^{2}). The racial makeup of the CDP was 95.59% White, 0.73% Black or African American, 0.24% Native American, 0.81% Asian, 0.02% Pacific Islander, 1.02% from other races, and 1.59% from two or more races. Hispanic or Latino of any race were 2.74% of the population.

There were 2,685 households, out of which 28.0% had children under the age of 18 living with them, 38.5% were married couples living together, 14.9% had a female householder with no husband present, and 40.7% were non-families. 34.1% of all households were made up of individuals, and 15.4% had someone living alone who was 65 years of age or older. The average household size was 2.30 and the average family size was 2.92.

In the CDP, the population was spread out, with 24.9% under the age of 18, 9.2% from 18 to 24, 28.5% from 25 to 44, 20.1% from 45 to 64, and 17.3% who were 65 years of age or older. The median age was 36 years. For every 100 females, there were 91.7 males. For every 100 females age 18 and over, there were 87.8 males.

The median income for a household in the CDP was $31,138, and the median income for a family was $35,805. Males had a median income of $36,348 versus $25,411 for females. The per capita income for the CDP was $17,906. About 11.5% of families and 13.6% of the population were below the poverty line, including 20.0% of those under age 18 and 8.4% of those age 65 or over.
