= Spencer (CDP), Massachusetts =

Spencer, Massachusetts
- CDP
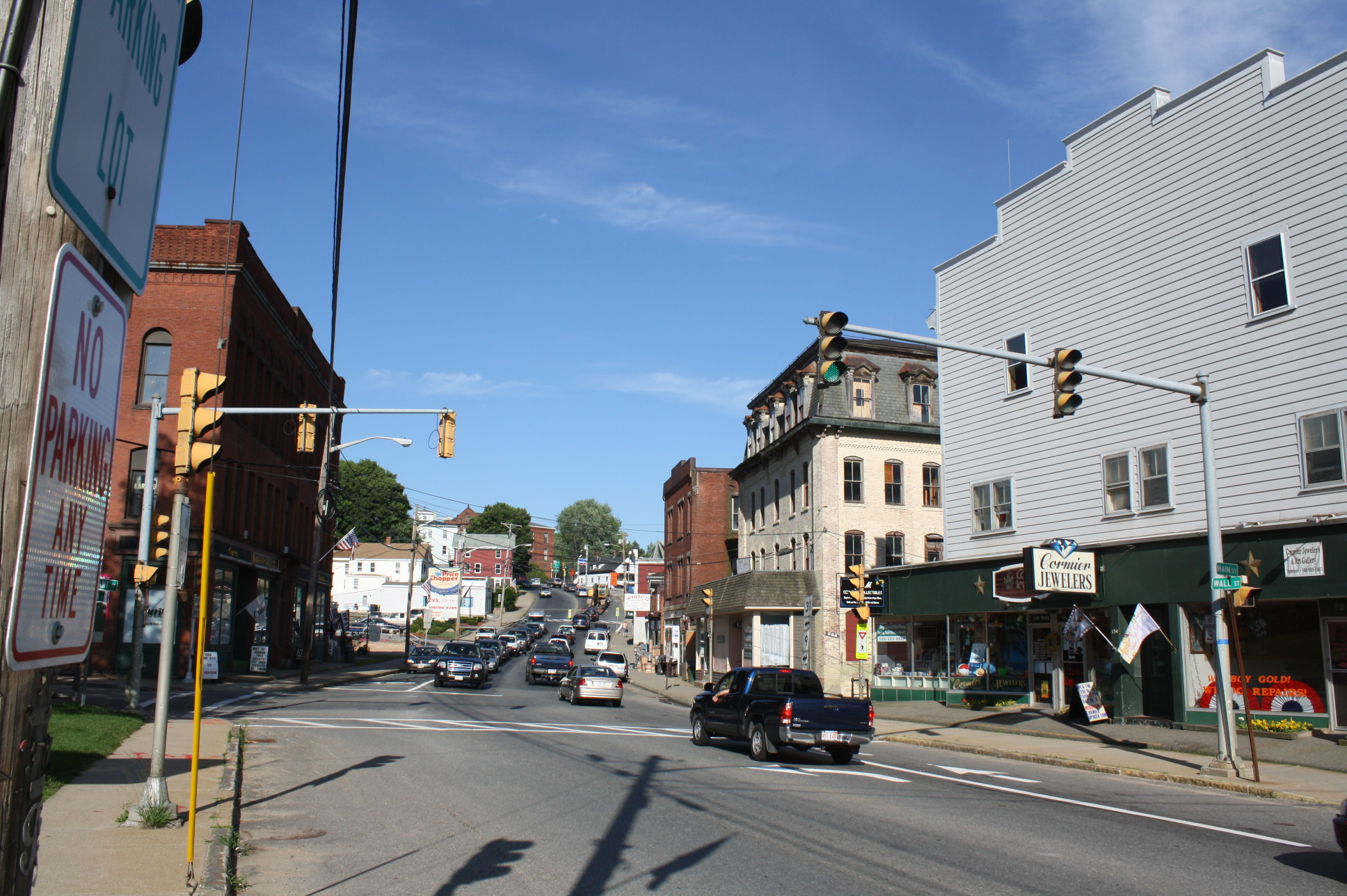
- Main Street

- Location in Worcester County and the state of Massachusetts.
- Coordinates: 42°14′36″N 71°59′40″W
- Country: United States
- State: Massachusetts
- County: Worcester

Area
  - Total: 2.17 sq mi (5.63 km^{2})
  - Land: 2.11 sq mi (5.46 km^{2})
  - Water: 0.062 sq mi (0.16 km^{2})
- Elevation: 856 ft (261 m)

Population (2020)
  - Total: 5,810
  - Density: 2,754.4/sq mi (1,063.49/km^{2})
- Time zone: UTC-5 (Eastern (EST))
  - Summer (DST): UTC-4 (EDT)
- ZIP code: 01562
- Area code: 508
- FIPS code: 25-66070
- GNIS feature ID: 0610417

Spencer is a census-designated place (CDP) in the town of Spencer in Worcester County, Massachusetts, United States. The population was 5,810 at the 2020 census.

== Geography ==
Spencer is located at 42°14′35″N 71°59′39″W (42.243276, -71.99437).

According to the United States Census Bureau, the CDP has a total area of 5.7 square kilometres (2.2 sq mi), of which 5.5 square kilometres (2.1 sq mi) is land and 0.2 square kilometres (0.077 sq mi) (2.74%) is water.

== Demographics ==
Historical population
Census	Pop.	Note	%±
2020	5,810		—
U.S. Decennial Census

At the 2020 census, there were 5,810 people, 2,681 households and 1,527 families residing in the CDP. The population density was 1,093.4 per square kilometre (2,832/sq mi). There were 2,722 housing units at an average density of 493.4 per square kilometre (1,278/sq mi). The racial make-up was 97.58% White, 0.61% Black or African American, 0.31% Native American, 0.28% Asian, 0.02% Pacific Islander, 0.41% from other races and 0.78% from two or more races. Hispanic or Latino of any race were 1.61% of the population.

There were 2,554 households, of which 29.8% had children under the age of 18 living with them, 42.8% were married couples living together, 12.5% had a female householder with no husband present and 40.2% were non-families. 33.0% of all households were made up of individuals, and 13.5% had someone living alone who was 65 years of age or older. The average household size was 2.35 and the average family size was 2.98.

24.4% of the population were under the age of 18, 9.9% from 18 to 24, 30.7% from 25 to 44, 20.9% from 45 to 64 and 14.1% were 65 years of age or older. The median age was 35 years. For every 100 females, there were 91.8 males. For every 100 females age 18 and over, there were 89.3 males.

The median household income was $35,206 and the median family income was $46,333. Males had a median income of $36,563 and females $25,738. The per capita income was $18,975. About 9.0% of families and 12.0% of the population were below the poverty line, including 16.6% of those under age 18 and 11.7% of those age 65 or over.
