= List of Interstate Highways in Massachusetts =

Interstate Highways in Massachusetts
- Highway marker for I-90 and I-495
- Interstate Highways highlighted in red

System information
- Maintained by MassDOT
- Length: 565.63 mi (910.29 km)
- Formed: August 14, 1957

Highway names
- Interstates: Interstate nn (I-nn)

System links
- Massachusetts State Highway System; Interstate; US; State

The Interstate Highways in Massachusetts comprise five current primary Interstate Highways and eight auxiliary Interstates. In addition, two auxiliary Interstates were proposed and then cancelled.

The longest Interstate Highway in Massachusetts is I-90 with 136 miles, followed by I-495 with 121 miles.

Several freeway projects in the Boston area planned as part of the Interstate Highway System were cancelled in the 1970s following community opposition, including the Inner Belt (I-695) and Southwest Expressway (I-95). The Big Dig megaproject in the 1990s and 2000s, which realigned several highways in Downtown Boston, included a new tunnel for I-93 to replace the Central Artery and an extension of I-90 via the Ted Williams Tunnel.

== Primary Interstate Highways ==
Number	Length (mi)	Length (km)	Southern or western terminus	Northern or eastern terminus	Formed	Removed	Notes
I-84	8.15	13.12	I-84 at Union, CT	I-90 in Sturbridge	1958	1971	Replaced part of former Route 15; Replaced by I-86
I-84	8.15	13.12	I-84 at Union, CT	I-90 in Sturbridge	1984	current	Renumbered back from I-86
I-86	8.15	13.12	I-84 at Union, CT	I-90 in Sturbridge	1971	1984	Replaced I-84; was later reverted back to I-84
I-89	—	—	—	—	1956	1960	Proposed to replace US 7 in original 1956 plan; rerouted prior to construction
I-90	135.72	218.42	I-90 at Canaan, NY	Route 1A in Boston	1958	current	Follows the Massachusetts Turnpike
I-91	54.99	88.50	I-91 at Enfield, CT	I-91 at Brattleboro, VT	1958	current	
I-93	47.07	75.75	I-95/US 1/Route 128 in Canton	I-93 at Salem, NH	1957	current	
I-95	91.95	147.98	I-95 at Pawtucket, RI	I-95 at Seabrook, NH	1957	current	
I-95E	40.73	65.55	I-95E at E.Providence, RI	—	1957	1959	Replaced by I-195
Former

== Auxiliary Interstate Highways ==
Number	Length (mi)	Length (km)	Southern or western terminus	Northern or eastern terminus	Formed	Removed	Notes
I-190	19.26	31.00	I-290 in Worcester	Route 2 in Leominster	1983	current	
I-195	40.73	65.55	I-195 at E.Providence, RI	I-495 at Wareham	1959	current	Replaced I-95E
I-290	20.16	32.44	I-395/I-90 in Auburn	I-495 in Marlborough	1970	current	
I-291	5.44	8.75	I-91/US 20 in Springfield	I-90 in Chicopee	1972	current	also known as the Springfield Expressway
I-295	4.23	6.81	I-295 at Cumberland, RI	I-95 in Attleborough	1969	current	
I-391	4.46	7.18	I-91 in Chicopee	High Street in Holyoke	1970	current	
I-395	11.91	19.17	I-395 at Thompson, CT	I-290 in Auburn	1983	current	
I-495	121.56	195.63	Route 25 in Wareham	I-95 in Salisbury	1960	current	Second longest auxiliary Interstate highway in the United States
I-495 BS	2.88	4.63	US 3 in Chelmsford	Gorham Street in Lowell	1962	2008	Unsigned; known as Lowell Connector; signs were posted at one time on local streets intersecting the Connector, it was the only Business Interstate in Massachusetts
I-695	—	—	I-95 in Boston	I-93 in Charlestown	1957	1971	Cancelled before it was constructed
I-895	—	—	I-895 at Warren, RI	I-95 and I-295 in Attleboro	1968	1982	Cancelled before it was constructed
Former
