= List of U.S. Highways in Massachusetts =

- Standard U.S. Highway shields
- U.S. Highways highlighted in red

System information
- Notes: Routes are not always state-maintained, and not all state highways are Routes.

Highway names
- Interstates: Route I-X or Route X
- US Highways: Route US X or Route X
- State: Route X

System links
- Massachusetts State Highway System; Interstate; US; State

The U.S. Highways in Massachusetts comprise eight current U.S. Highways and one former route.

== Mainline routes ==
Number	Length (mi)	Length (km)	Southern or western terminus	Northern or eastern terminus	Formed	Removed	Notes
US 1	85.60	137.76	US 1 at Pawtucket, RI	US 1 in Seabrook, NH	1926	current	Mostly follows the old New England Route 1
US 3	35.70	57.45	Route 3 / Route 2A in Cambridge	US 3 in Nashua, NH	1926	current	Mostly follows the old New England Route 6
US 5	53.46	86.04	US 5 in Enfield, CT	US 5 in Guilford, VT	1926	current	Mostly follows the old New England Route 2
US 6	117.46	189.03	US 6 in East Providence, RI	Route 6A in Provincetown	1926	current	Mostly follows the old New England Route 3
US 7	53.9	86.7	US 7 in North Canaan, CT	US 7 in Pownal, VT	1926	current	Mostly follows the old New England Route 4
US 20	153.44	246.94	US 20 in New Lebanon, NY	Route 2 in Boston	1926	current	Mostly follows the old New England Route 5
US 44	38.40	61.80	US 44 in East Providence, RI	Route 3A in Plymouth	1935	current	
US 202	79.6	128.1	US 202 in Granby, CT	US 202 in Rindge, NH	1935	current	
Former

== Special routes ==
Number	Length (mi)	Length (km)	Southern or western terminus	Northern or eastern terminus	Formed	Removed	Notes
US 5A	—	—	Suffield, CT	Springfield	1932	1938	Replaced by Route 5A; which became Route 159
US 6 Byp.	—	—	US 6 / Route 28 in Bourne	US 6 / Route 6A in Sagamore	—	—	signs were posted along both sides of Cape Cod Canal
Former
