= Massachusetts State Highway System =

Highways in the US state

- Highway markers for Interstate 90, U.S. Route 20 and Route 28

System information
- Notes: Routes are not always state-maintained, and not all state highways are Routes.

Highway names
- Interstates: Route I-X or Route X
- US Highways: Route US X or Route X
- State: Route X

System links
- Massachusetts State Highway System; Interstate; US; State

The Massachusetts State Highway System in the U.S. Commonwealth of Massachusetts is a system of state-numbered routes assigned and marked by the highway division of the Massachusetts Department of Transportation (MassDOT). U.S. Highways and Interstate Highways are included in the system; the only overlaps are with the end-to-end U.S. Route 3 and Route 3 and the far-apart Interstate 295, shared with Rhode Island, and Route 295, shared with New York State. A state highway in Massachusetts is a road maintained by the state, which may or may not have a number. Not all numbered routes are maintained or owned by the state.

== History ==
The Massachusetts Highway Commission (MHC) was the first highway commission in the U.S., formed in 1893 in response to a commission of inquiry finding that over 90% of the public roads in the state were in poor condition. The first state highway in Massachusetts was a 5305.17-foot (1617.02 m) section of Fitchburg Road (now Main Street, part of Route 119) in Ashby. The MHC laid it out as a state highway on August 15, 1894 from a point west of South Road to a point west of Route 31. The road was paved with 15–20 foot (4.5–6 m) macadam, with work beginning August 21, 1894 and ending July 15, 1895. The 50–66 foot (15–20 m) right-of-way is still owned by MassDOT under the original layout.

Massachusetts first gained numbered routes in 1922, with the formation of the New England Interstate Highways. Three-digit numbers were reserved for shorter routes. Route 138 and Route 140 were designated by 1925, and by 1926 the numbers from Route 101 to Route 142 (except Route 136) had been assigned.

The establishment of the U.S. Highway System in 1926 resulted in several of the New England Interstate routes having to be renumbered. The New England Interstate routes that conflicted with new U.S. Highway numbers were assigned newly freed single-digit numbers. Beginning in 1929, local routes were assigned new two-digit numbers. With the exception of Route 143, which was renumbered from Route 109A ca. 1933, new routes were given two-digit numbers for a while. Larger three-digit numbers were eventually assigned.

Over the years, most of the state's highways have been maintained by a varied list of agencies, including the Massachusetts Highway Department, Massachusetts Turnpike Authority, and the Massachusetts Port Authority, but are now maintained by the consolidated MassDOT. The Massachusetts Department of Conservation and Recreation's Bureau of Engineering still manages and/or operates a number of parkways across the Commonwealth.

All routes that end at a state border and continue as a numbered route on the other side have been renumbered on one side of the border to match. Except for Route 295, far from Interstate 295, numbers that were duplicated with Interstate Highways were renumbered, mostly in 1959 when the Interstate numbers were assigned.

- The longest numbered highway in the state is U.S. Route 20, which runs for 153 miles (246 km).
- The longest state highway is Route 28, which runs for 151.92 miles (244.49 km).
- The longest Interstate highway in Massachusetts is Interstate 90 (the Mass Pike), which runs 138.1 miles (222.3 km).
- The shortest route in Massachusetts is Route 15, which runs for only 0.23 miles (0.37 km). The shortest signed highway is Route 108, which runs for 0.92 miles (1.48 km). Both are short extensions of state highways in neighboring states. The shortest route completely within state borders is Route 240, which runs for 1 mile (1.6 km).
- The shortest Interstate in Massachusetts is Interstate 295, which runs as a 4-mile (6.4 km) extension of I-295 in Rhode Island.

There are no state highways of any kind in the island counties, Nantucket or Dukes. There are eight mainland towns which have no state highway routes: Mount Washington and Tyringham in Berkshire County, Hampden in Hampden County, Middlefield in Hampshire County, Leyden, Monroe and Rowe in Franklin County, and Nahant in Essex County. Other than Nahant, which is a peninsula town just south of the city of Lynn, the towns are mostly isolated rural communities in the western half of the state. Additionally, there are seven other towns which have Interstates or US Routes, but do not have any Massachusetts state highways: Chester, Holland, Mattapoisett, Montgomery, New Ashford, Shutesbury and Wilbraham. Wellfleet does not have any signed state highways but includes the silent concurrency of Route 6A with U.S. Route 6. Several other towns have less than a mile of state highway.

== Signage practices ==
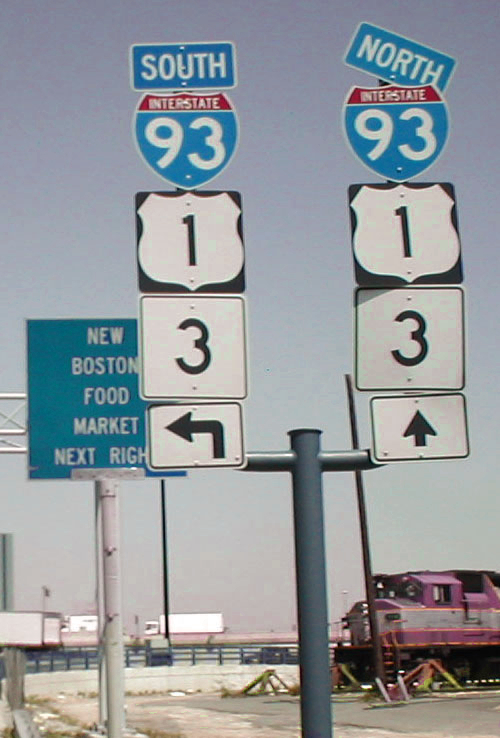
Shields for Interstate 93, U.S. 1 and Route 3

=== State routes ===
Massachusetts uses a simple design for its state route shields. Black numerals are displayed on a plain white shield, usually with a black border near the edge of the sign, although this differs from sign to sign, especially on highway overheads. Single- and double-digit state highway numbers are posted on standard square sign panels, while three-digit (and three- and four-character alternate such as 28A) numbers are displayed on elongated panels. State route shields on freeways, such as Route 24 and Route 128 have the same design, but are usually much larger in size for easier viewing at highway speeds.

=== U.S. Routes ===
Massachusetts uses the standard white-shield on black background design for its U.S. Routes, used in all states except for California. Signs for U.S. Routes on green highway signs generally omit the black background, but some older signs still have them. A number of signs installed on the U.S. Route 3 expressway are of a cut-out design, without the black background. U.S. Routes on freeways usually have extra-large sign panels posted.
NOTE: Alternates of U.S. routes in Massachusetts are signed as state highways (Routes 1A, 3A (northern), 6A, 7A, and 20A).

=== Interstate Highways ===
Massachusetts uses standard Interstate highway shields without the state name on the shield, although a small number of very old signs do exist with the state name. Interstate shields are usually of the extra-large variety, with the exception of the Massachusetts Turnpike (Interstate 90), which uses standard shields.

=== Auxiliary routes ===
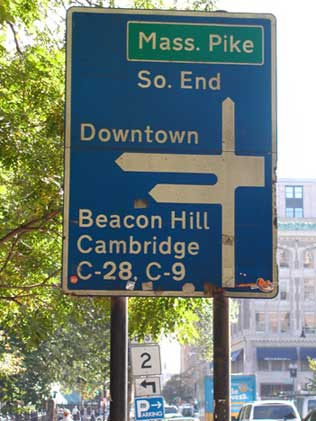
UK "Worboys" style road sign in Boston showing former C routes

Massachusetts does not use auxiliary tabs for route signage, and as such contains no bypass or business routes. Massachusetts formerly had "city routes", which were signed C1, C9, C28, and C37, as city alignments of the respective state routes. All of these designations were decommissioned in the early 1970s. Since then, no route in Massachusetts has ever had more than one alternate, save for multiple sections of a single numbered route such as 1A, 2A or 3A. (a Route 3B existed in the 1920s but was renumbered to Route 38).

The Lowell Connector was technically the only "auxiliary" route in the state, having been formerly signed as Interstate 495 Business Spur in the 1960s.

=== Exit numbering ===
Massachusetts converted from sequential to mileage-marker exit numbering on its freeways in 2021 with the exception of I-291, I-391, Lowell Connector, and Route 213. The state amendments to the 2009 national MUTCD, published in January 2012, stated that Massachusetts would be changing all exit numbers to the mileage-based system "within the next five to ten years". This change was supposed to be made starting in 2016 when a project to renumber all sequential numbered exits to those based on highway mileposts. This project, though, was indefinitely postponed in the middle of 2016 until November 18, 2019, when MassDot confirmed that beginning in late summer 2020 the exit renumbering project would begin. Exit numbers are posted on all of its Interstate Highways, as well as other major freeways in the state, including the freeway portions of Route 2, Route 3 (Pilgrims Highway), the Northwest Expressway (part of US 3), Route 24, Route 25, Route 128, the southern portion of Route 140, Route 213, and most recently, Route 146.

The state completed its renumbering of Interstate Highways to use the mileage-marker system in September 2021.

Prior to renumbering, five freeways in Massachusetts contained irregular exit numbering patterns:

- On Route 2, exit numbers started at 14 and increased to 43, with a gap in the freeway between Acton and Concord, then resumed with exit 50, then stopped before resuming at 52 and ending at 60.
- The Northwest Expressway (US 3) was the one freeway in Massachusetts that still used the "25 is 128" system, where exit 25 was at Route 128 and exit numbers increased leaving Boston. This was previously common on expressways around Boston. As such, its exit numbering scheme started at 25 (at Route 128/I-95) and went up to 36.
- Route 128 had reversed exit numbering; that is, exit numbers increased going north-to-south. Exit numbers started at 29 and ended at 10. There were no exits 1-9, nor exit 11, and exit 27, a former at-grade intersection was removed. Route 128 had always had this system; however most of its exit numbering was previously replaced by the standard south-to-north of I-93 and I-95 south of Peabody.
- I-93 in Boston had gone under many exit numbering changes since the Big Dig project was completed, and many old interchanges were closed or reconfigured. Numbering on the Interstate went from 1 to 48, but several exit numbers (17, 19, 21, 22, and 25) had been removed.
- Numbering on the Massachusetts Turnpike (I-90) increased from 1 to 26; however, exits 11 and 11A were almost 10 miles (16 km) apart, exits 14 and 15 were the same exit, exit 15B was a westbound-only off-ramp, exits 18 and 20 were the same exit, exit 19 was a mainline toll plaza until 2016, and exits 21 and 23 were westbound on-ramps only. This resulted from the turnpike authority's policy of numbering toll plazas for collection purposes rather than interchanges directly.

== See also ==
- List of turnpikes in Massachusetts
- Metrication in the United States § Transportation
