= Upton Town Hall =

- U.S. National Register of Historic Places
- U.S. Historic district – Contributing property
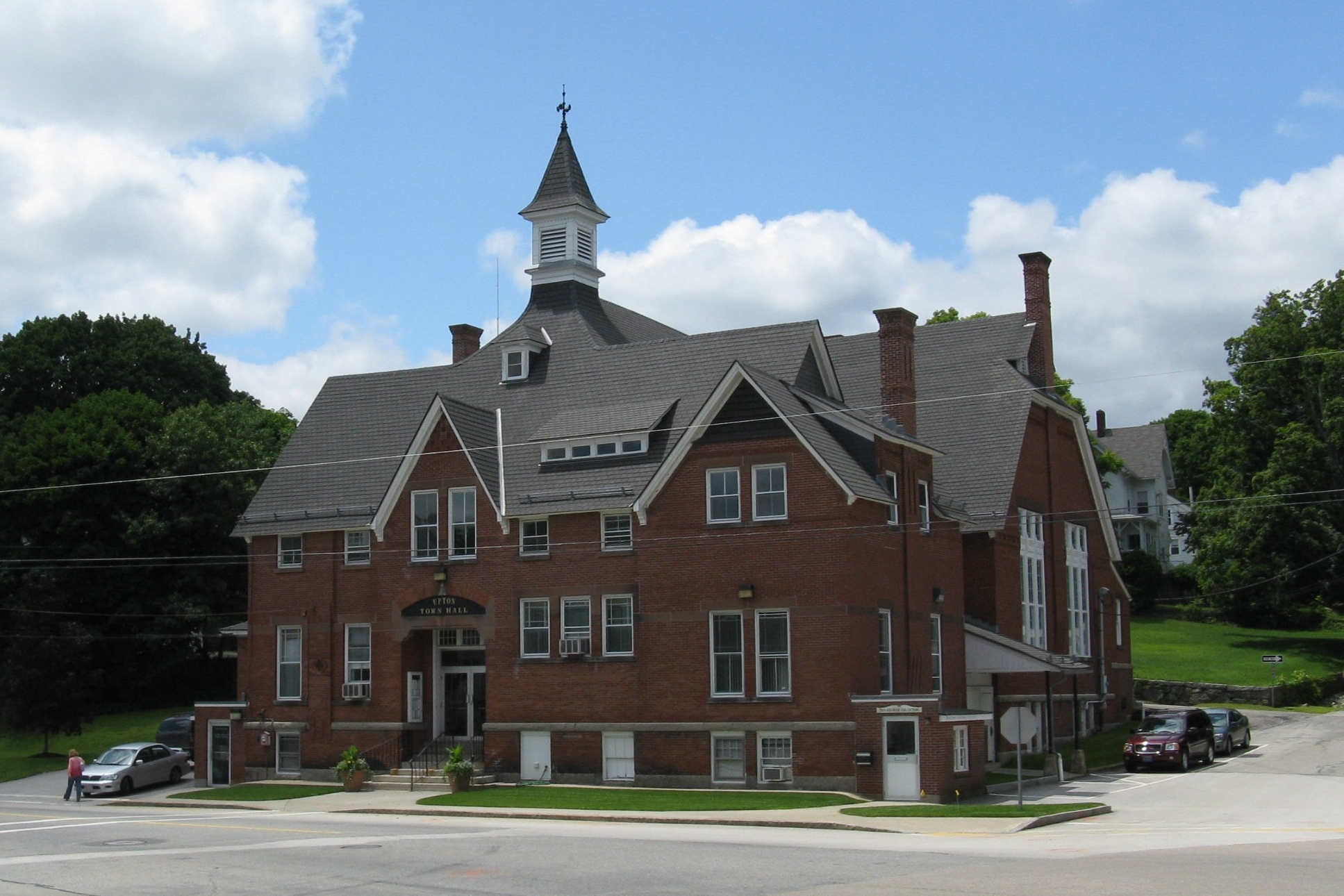
- Upton Town Hall

- Location within Massachusetts Location within the United States
- Location: Upton, Massachusetts
- Coordinates: 42°10′26″N 71°35′32″W
- Architect: E. Boyden & Son
- Architectural style: Late Gothic Revival
- Part of: Upton Center Historic District (ID14001150)
- NRHP reference No.: 99000185

Significant dates
- Added to NRHP: February 12, 1999
- Designated CP: January 14, 2015

Upton Town Hall is a historic town hall at 1 Main Street in Upton, Massachusetts, United States. The Late Gothic Revival/Queen Anne brick building was built in 1884 to a design by Worcester architects E. Boyden & Son. It features irregular massing typical of Queen Anne style, with a variety of gables and roof lines. When first built, the building housed town offices and the library, the latter of which has since moved out. The interior includes a richly decorated auditorium.

The building was listed on the National Register of Historic Places in 1999.

== See also ==
- National Register of Historic Places listings in Worcester County, Massachusetts
