= West Warren, Massachusetts =

- Census-designated place
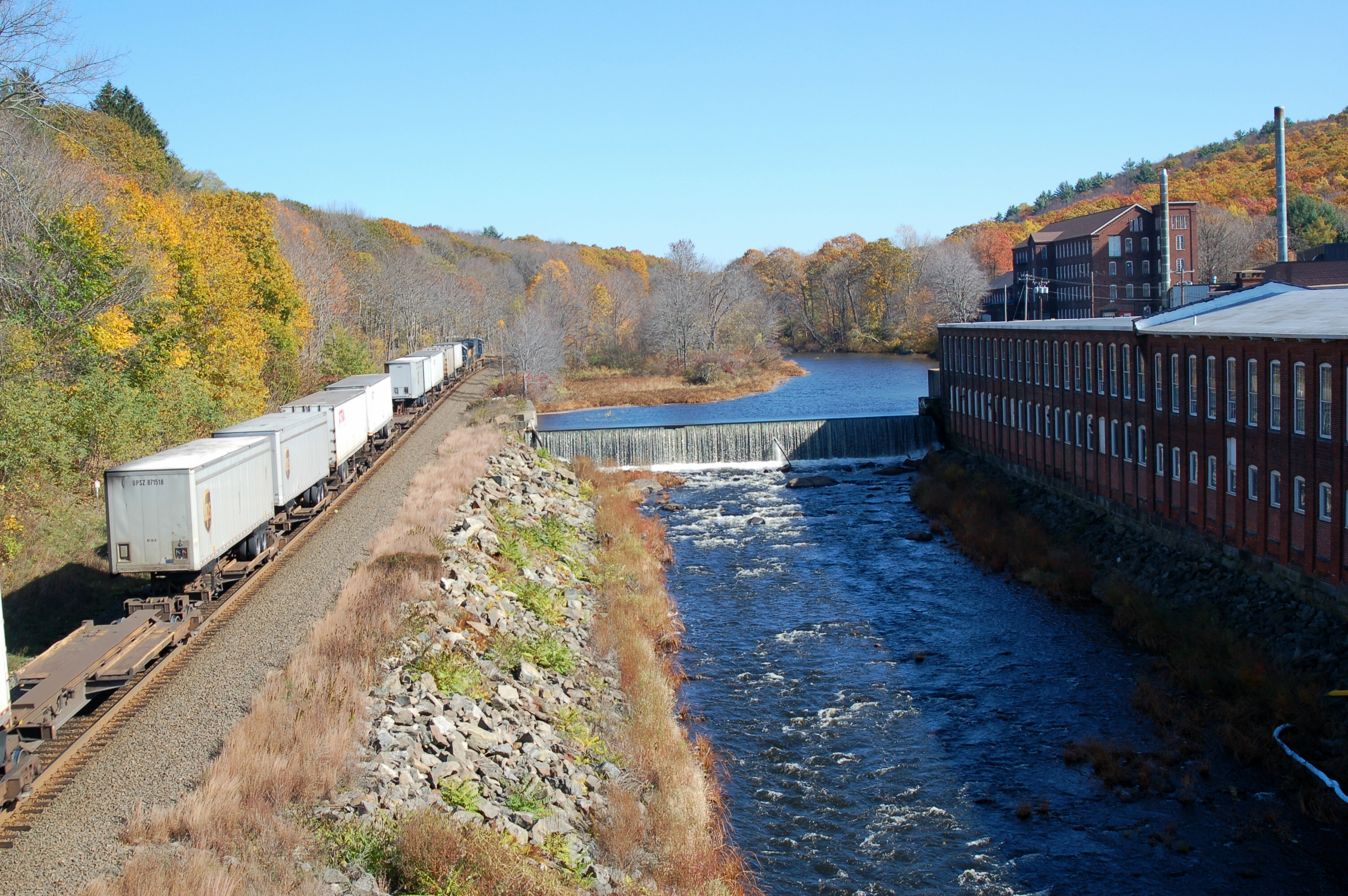
- Wrights Complex Lower Dam

- Location within Massachusetts Location within the United States
- Coordinates: 42°12′42″N 72°14′8″W
- Country: United States
- State: Massachusetts
- County: Worcester
- Town: Warren

Area
  - Total: 1.27 sq mi (3.30 km^{2})
  - Land: 1.27 sq mi (3.28 km^{2})
  - Water: 0.0077 sq mi (0.02 km^{2})
- Elevation: 545 ft (166 m)

Population (2020)
  - Total: 721
  - Density: 568.9/sq mi (219.65/km^{2})
- Time zone: UTC-5 (Eastern (EST))
  - Summer (DST): UTC-4 (EDT)
- ZIP Code: 01092
- Area code: 413
- FIPS code: 25-78445
- GNIS feature ID: 2806313

West Warren is a census-designated place (CDP) and village in the town of Warren, Worcester County, Massachusetts, United States. It sits on the north side of the Quaboag River along Massachusetts Route 67, 2.5 miles (4.0 km) west of Warren village and 9 miles (14 km) northeast of Palmer.

As of the 2020 census, West Warren had a population of 721.

West Warren was first listed as a CDP prior to the 2020 census.

== Demographics ==
Historical population
Census	Pop.	Note	%±
2020	721		—
U.S. Decennial Census
