= East Brookfield =

East Brookfield is the name of the following places in the United States:

- East Brookfield, Massachusetts, a New England town
  - East Brookfield (CDP), Massachusetts, the main village in the town
- East Brookfield, Vermont
- East Brookfield River in Massachusetts
