= Upton (CDP), Massachusetts =

Upton, Massachusetts
- Census-designated place
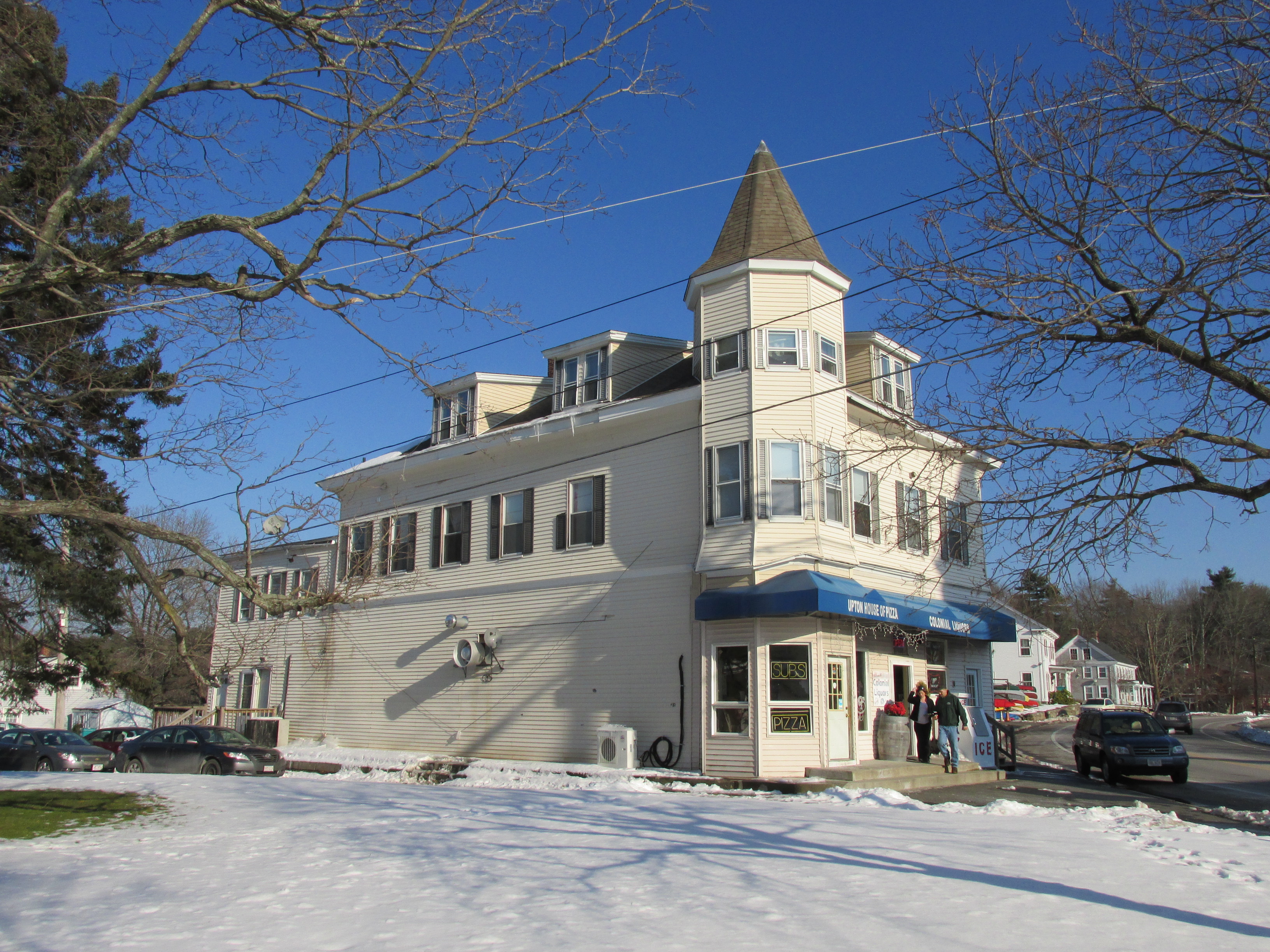
- Upton House of Pizza

- Location in Worcester County and the state of Massachusetts
- Coordinates: 42°10′30″N 71°36′44″W
- Country: United States
- State: Massachusetts
- County: Worcester
- Town: Upton

Area
  - Total: 2.55 sq mi (6.60 km^{2})
  - Land: 2.47 sq mi (6.40 km^{2})
  - Water: 0.081 sq mi (0.21 km^{2})
- Elevation: 381 ft (116 m)

Population (2020)
  - Total: 3,090
  - Density: 1,251.3/sq mi (483.14/km^{2})
- Time zone: UTC-5 (Eastern (EST))
  - Summer (DST): UTC-4 (EDT)
- ZIP Code: 01568
- Area codes: 508/774
- FIPS code: 25-71445
- GNIS feature ID: 2378243

Upton is a census-designated place (CDP) in the town of Upton in Worcester County, Massachusetts, United States. The population was 3,013 at the 2010 census, out of 7,542 in the entire town. The CDP includes the villages of Upton and West Upton.

== Geography ==
Upton and West Upton are located in the central and western part of the town of Upton. Massachusetts Route 140 passes through the CDP, leading northwest 12 miles (19 km) to Shrewsbury and southeast 14 miles (23 km) to Franklin.

According to the United States Census Bureau, the CDP has a total area of 6.6 km^{2} (2.6 mi^{2}), of which 6.4 km^{2} (2.5 mi^{2}) is land and 0.2 km^{2} (0.1 mi^{2}) (2.73%) is water.

== Notable areas ==
The community is home to a number of notable town of Upton landmarks, including the town's police department, fire department, town library, and the town hall. It is also home to the town's historic Knowlton Hat Factory, now repurposed as the Millhaus Apartments.

== Demographics ==
Historical population
Census	Pop.	Note	%±
2020	3,090		—
U.S. Decennial Census

As of the census of 2000, there were 2,326 people, 914 households, and 617 families residing in the CDP, at the time listed as "Upton-West Upton". The population density was 360.7/km^{2} (935.4/mi^{2}). There were 940 housing units at an average density of 145.8/km^{2} (378.0/mi^{2}). The racial makeup of the CDP was 97.12% White, 0.43% Black or African American, 0.04% Native American, 1.03% Asian, 0.39% from other races, and 0.99% from two or more races. Hispanic or Latino of any race were 0.69% of the population.

There were 914 households, out of which 36.9% had children under the age of 18 living with them, 56.9% were married couples living together, 8.1% had a female householder with no husband present, and 32.4% were non-families. 27.9% of all households were made up of individuals, and 13.0% had someone living alone who was 65 years of age or older. The average household size was 2.50 and the average family size was 3.11.

In the CDP, the population was spread out, with 27.9% under the age of 18, 3.9% from 18 to 24, 34.5% from 25 to 44, 20.4% from 45 to 64, and 13.4% who were 65 years of age or older. The median age was 37 years. For every 100 females, there were 87.4 males. For every 100 females age 18 and over, there were 85.6 males.

The median income for a household in the CDP was $62,578, and the median income for a family was $75,937. Males had a median income of $51,071 versus $35,351 for females. The per capita income for the CDP was $26,502. About 3.0% of families and 5.3% of the population were below the poverty line, including 7.1% of those under age 18 and 8.7% of those age 65 or over.
