= Worcester County, Massachusetts =

County in Massachusetts, United States

- County
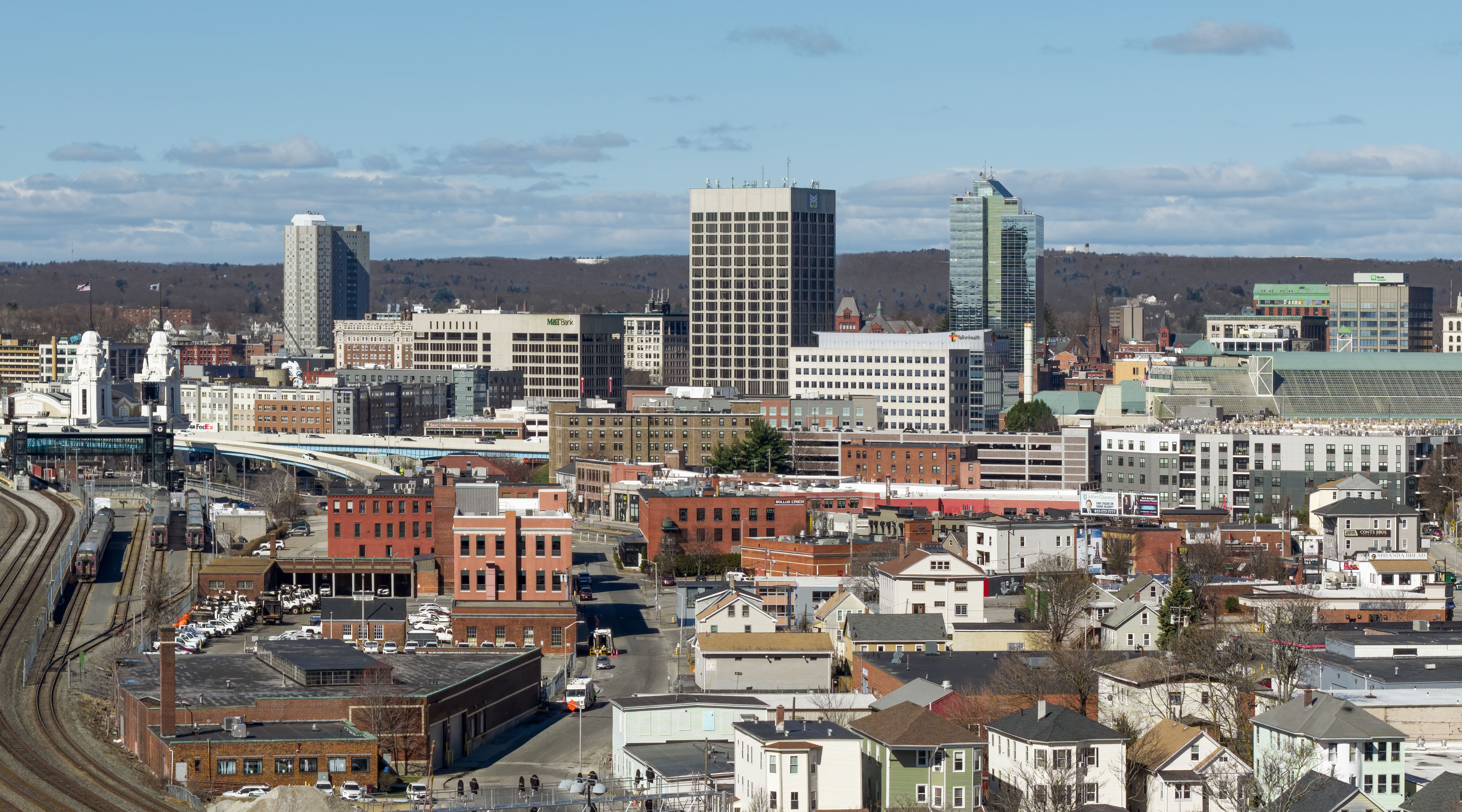
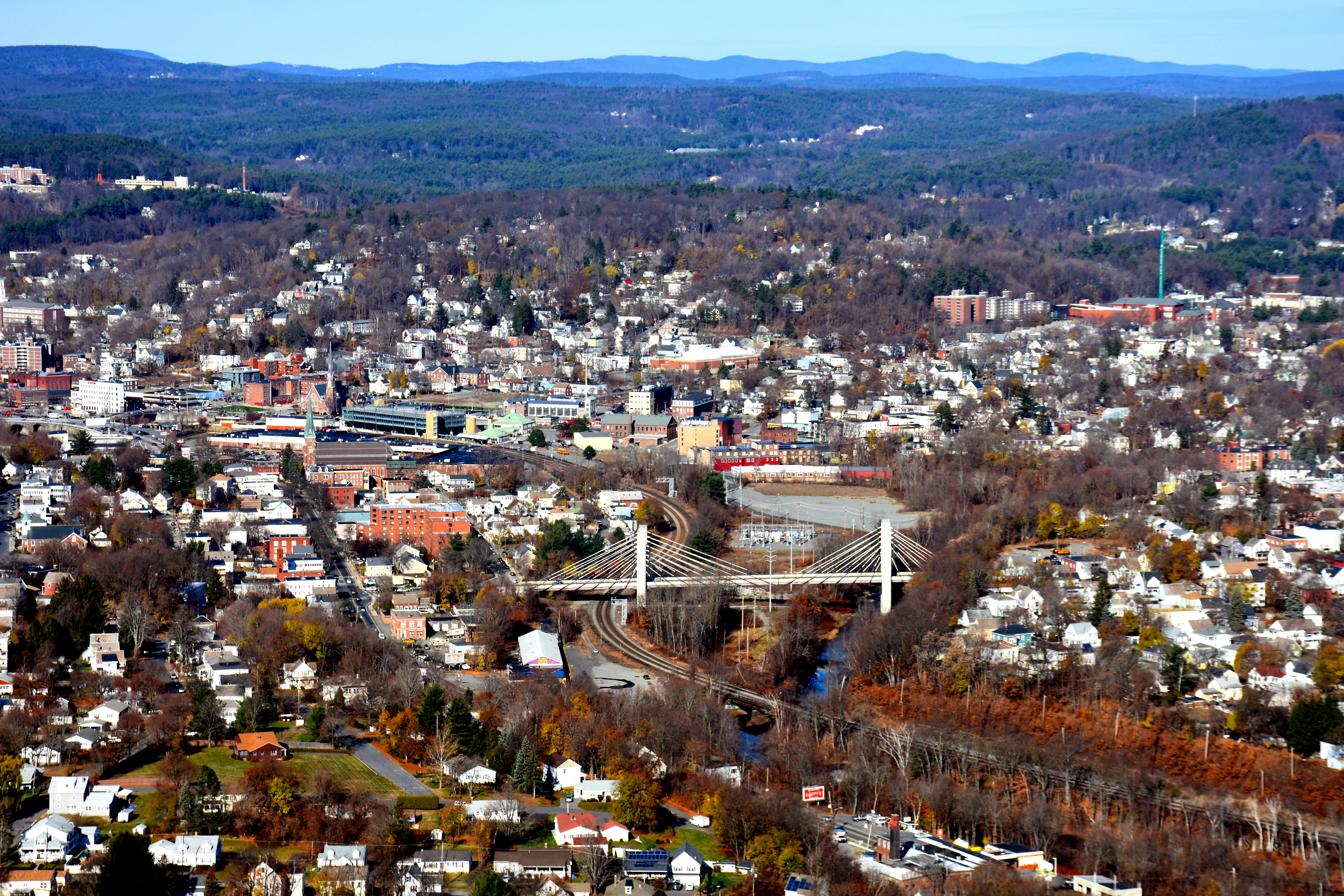
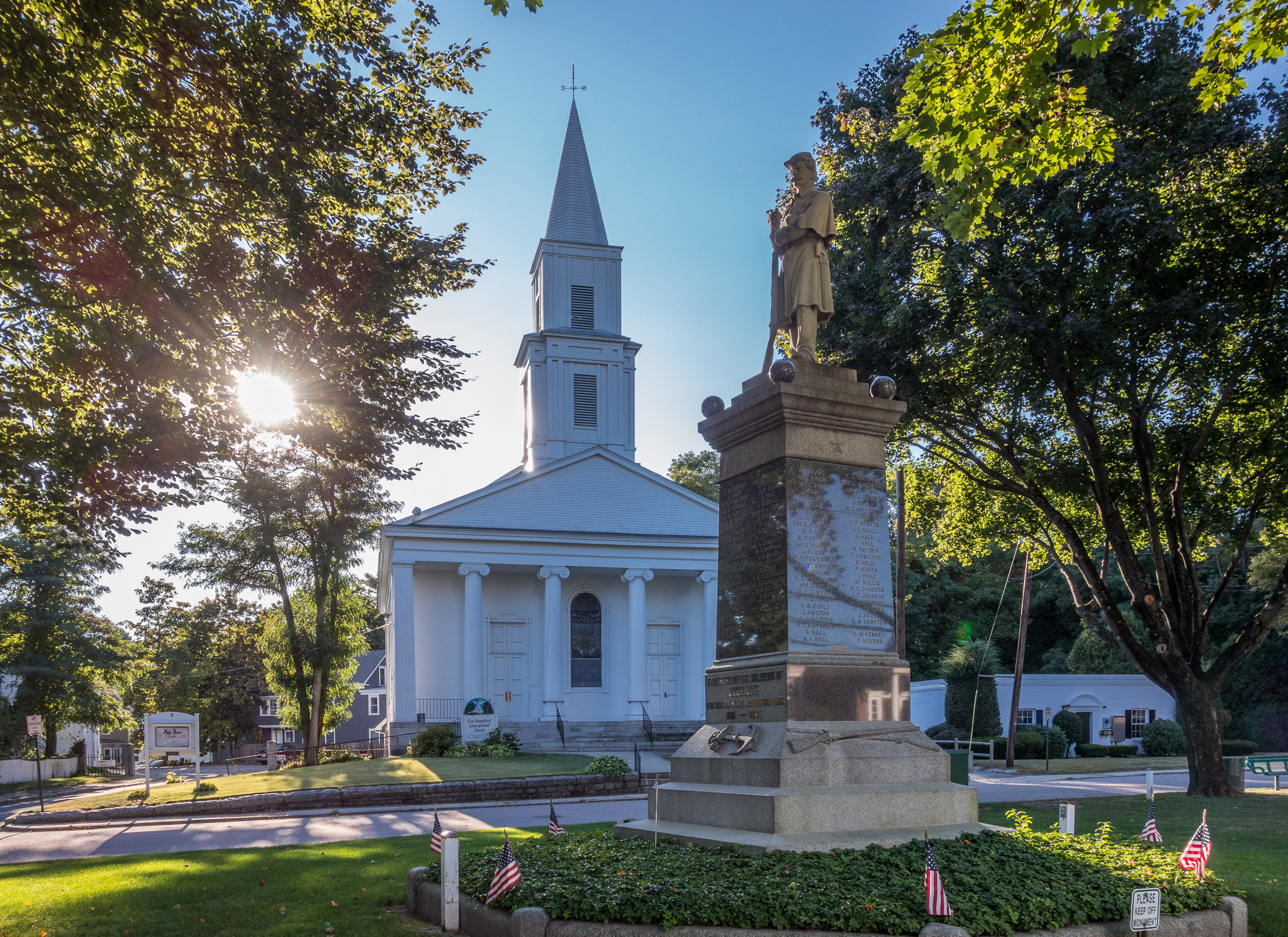
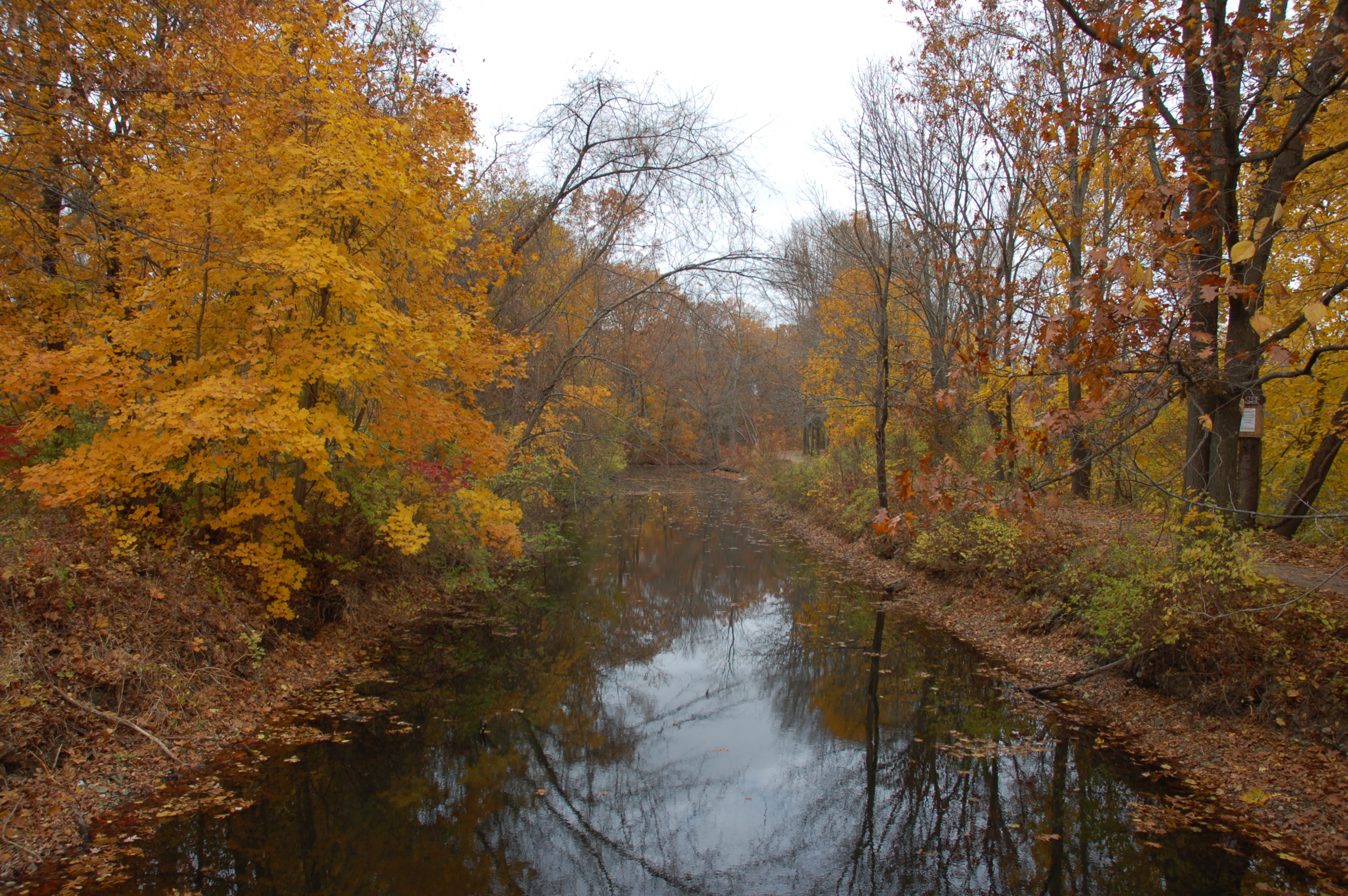
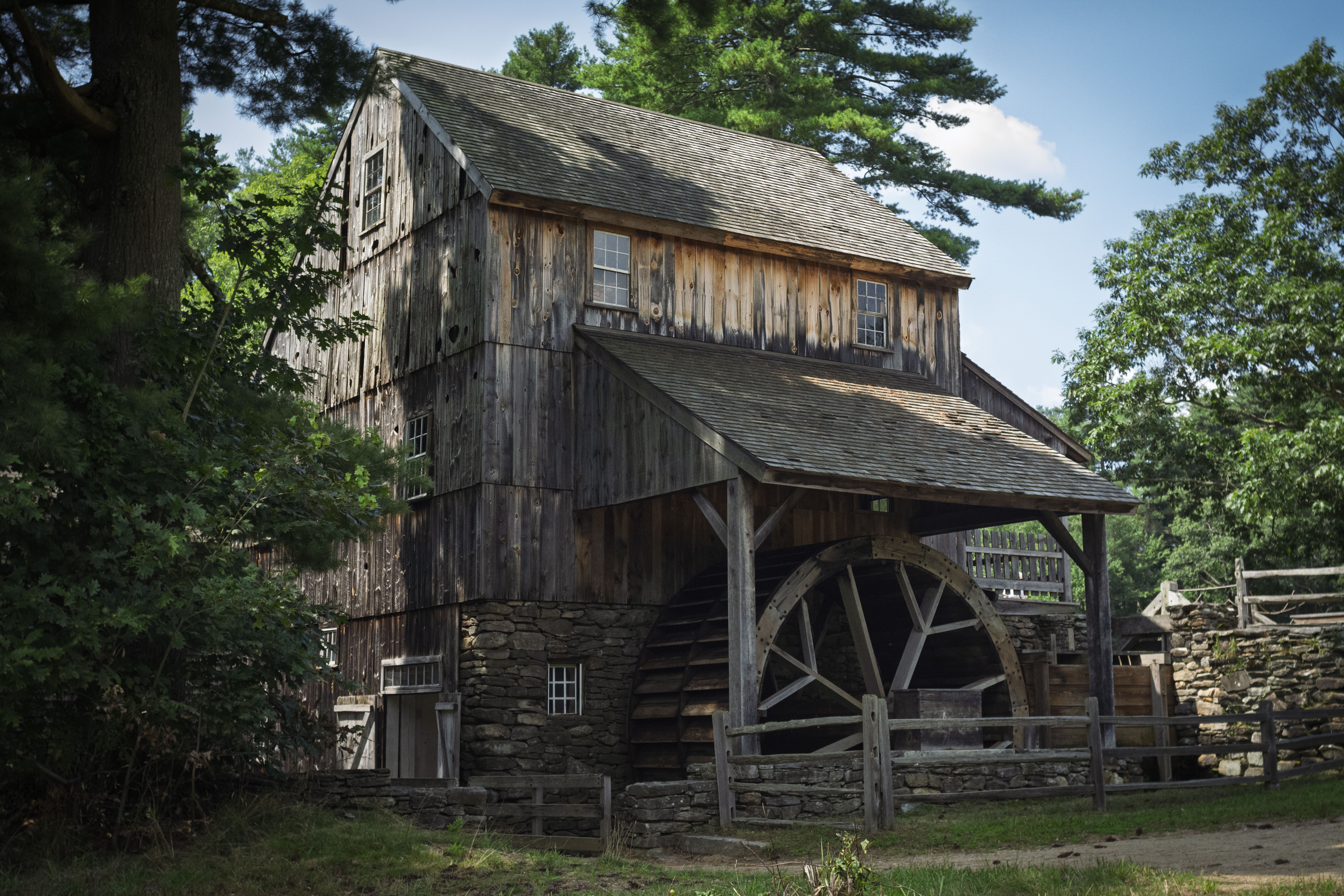
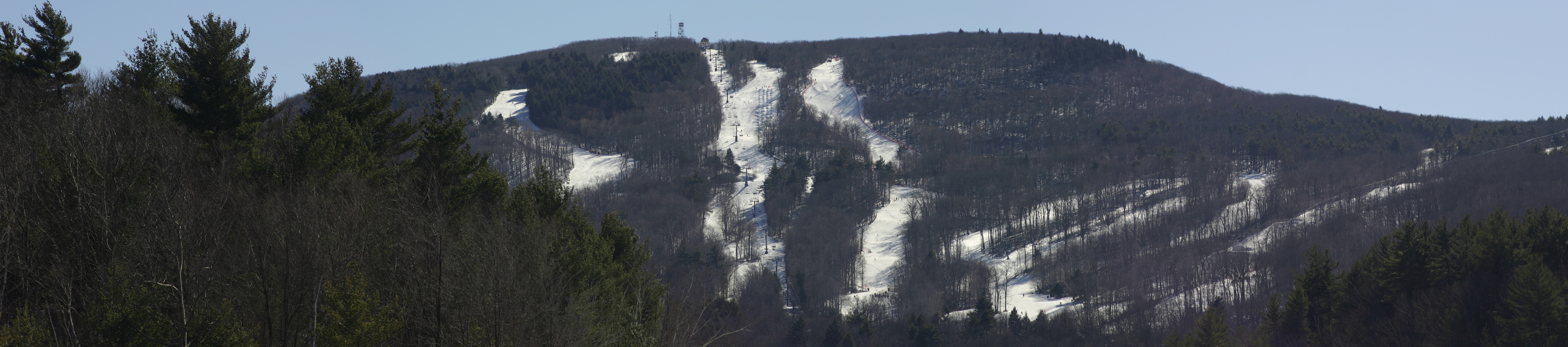
- Worcester Fitchburg Uxbridge Blackstone Canal Old Sturbridge Village Mount Wachusett

- Seal

- Location within the U.S. state of Massachusetts
- Coordinates: 42°21′N 71°55′W
- Country: United States
- State: Massachusetts
- Founded: April 2, 1731
- Named for: Worcester, Massachusetts
- Seat: Worcester
- Largest city: Worcester

Area
  - Total: 1,579 sq mi (4,090 km^{2})
  - Land: 1,511 sq mi (3,910 km^{2})
  - Water: 68 sq mi (180 km^{2})

Population (2020)
  - Total: 862,111
  - Estimate (2025): 888,502 ▲
  - Density: 570.7/sq mi (220.3/km^{2})
- Time zone: UTC−5 (Eastern)
  - Summer (DST): UTC−4 (EDT)
- Congressional districts: 1st, 2nd, 3rd, 4th

Worcester County (/ˈwʊstər/ WUUST-ər) is located in the U.S. state of Massachusetts. At the 2020 census, the population was 862,111, making it the second-most populous county in Massachusetts. Being 1,510.6 square miles of land area, it is the largest county in Massachusetts by geographic area. The largest city and traditional shire town is Worcester. Worcester County is part of the Worcester, MA–CT metropolitan statistical area and the Boston-Worcester-Providence combined statistical area.

== History ==
Worcester County was formed from the eastern portion of colonial Hampshire County, the western portion of the original Middlesex County and the extreme western portion of the original Suffolk County. When the government of Worcester County was established on April 2, 1731, Worcester was chosen as its shire town (later known as a county seat). From that date until the dissolution of the county government, it was the only county seat. Because of the size of the county, there were fifteen attempts over 140 years to split the county into two counties, but without success.

Initially, Lancaster was proposed as the seat of the northern county; later, Petersham was proposed once and Fitchburg was proposed repeatedly, most recently in 1903. Perhaps as a concession, in August 1884 the Worcester County Registry of Deeds was split in two, with the Worcester Northern registry placed in Fitchburg.

== Geography ==
According to the U.S. Census Bureau, the county has a total area of 1,579 square miles (4,090 km^{2}), of which 1,511 square miles (3,910 km^{2}) is land and 68 square miles (180 km^{2}) (4.3%) is water.

It is the largest county in Massachusetts by area. The county is larger geographically than the entire state of Rhode Island even including Rhode Island's water ocean limit boundaries. The county constitutes Central Massachusetts, separating the Greater Springfield area from the Greater Boston area. It stretches from the northern to the southern border of the state. The geographic center of Massachusetts is in Rutland.

Worcester County is one of two Massachusetts counties that borders three different neighboring states; (New Hampshire, Connecticut and Rhode Island); the other being Berkshire County. They are also the only two counties to touch both the northern and southern state lines.

=== Adjacent counties ===
- Cheshire County, New Hampshire - north
- Hillsborough County, New Hampshire - north/northeast
- Middlesex County - east/northeast
- Norfolk County - east/southeast
- Providence County, Rhode Island - south/southeast
- Windham County, Connecticut - south
- Tolland County, Connecticut - south/southwest
- Hampden County - west/southwest
- Hampshire County - west
- Franklin County - west/northwest

=== National protected areas ===
- Blackstone River Valley National Historical Park (part)
- Oxbow National Wildlife Refuge (part)

== Demographics ==
Historical population
Census	Pop.	Note	%±
1790	56,764		—
1800	61,192		7.8%
1810	64,910		6.1%
1820	73,625		13.4%
1830	84,355		14.6%
1840	95,313		13.0%
1850	130,789		37.2%
1860	159,659		22.1%
1870	192,716		20.7%
1880	226,897		17.7%
1890	280,787		23.8%
1900	346,958		23.6%
1910	399,657		15.2%
1920	455,135		13.9%
1930	491,242		7.9%
1940	504,470		2.7%
1950	546,401		8.3%
1960	583,228		6.7%
1970	637,969		9.4%
1980	646,352		1.3%
1990	709,705		9.8%
2000	750,963		5.8%
2010	798,552		6.3%
2020	862,111		8.0%
2025 (est.)	888,502	▲	3.1%
U.S. Decennial Census; 1790-1960 1900-1990; 1990-2000 2010 2020

=== 2020 census ===
As of the 2020 census, the county had a population of 862,111. Of the residents, 20.7% were under the age of 18 and 16.4% were 65 years of age or older; the median age was 40.2 years. For every 100 females there were 97.2 males, and for every 100 females age 18 and over there were 95.0 males. 78.8% of residents lived in urban areas and 21.2% lived in rural areas.

The racial makeup of the county was 73.6% White, 5.6% Black or African American, 0.3% American Indian and Alaska Native, 5.4% Asian, 0.0% Native Hawaiian and Pacific Islander, 6.4% from some other race, and 8.7% from two or more races. Hispanic or Latino residents of any race comprised 13.0% of the population.

There were 331,797 households in the county, of which 29.9% had children under the age of 18 living with them and 26.8% had a female householder with no spouse or partner present. About 27.2% of all households were made up of individuals and 11.3% had someone living alone who was 65 years of age or older.

There were 351,764 housing units, of which 5.7% were vacant. Among occupied housing units, 63.8% were owner-occupied and 36.2% were renter-occupied. The homeowner vacancy rate was 1.0% and the rental vacancy rate was 4.4%.

=== Racial and ethnic composition ===
Worcester County, Massachusetts – Racial and ethnic composition Note: the US Census treats Hispanic/Latino as an ethnic category. This table excludes Latinos from the racial categories and assigns them to a separate category. Hispanics/Latinos may be of any race.
Race / Ethnicity (NH = Non-Hispanic)	Pop 1980	Pop 1990	Pop 2000	Pop 2010	Pop 2020	% 1980	% 1990	% 2000	% 2010	% 2020
White alone (NH)	618,636	650,265	649,227	644,299	611,207	95.71%	91.62%	86.45%	80.68%	70.90%
Black or African American alone (NH)	8,419	13,478	18,257	29,084	44,222	1.30%	1.90%	2.43%	3.64%	5.13%
Native American or Alaska Native alone (NH)	897	1,267	1,499	1,298	1,146	0.14%	0.18%	0.20%	0.16%	0.13%
Asian alone (NH)	2,840	11,134	19,561	31,597	46,110	0.44%	1.57%	2.60%	3.96%	5.35%
Native Hawaiian or Pacific Islander alone (NH)	x	x	188	178	176	x	x	0.03%	0.02%	0.02%
Other race alone (NH)	1,343	621	1,686	3,634	9,424	0.21%	0.09%	0.22%	0.46%	1.09%
Mixed race or Multiracial (NH)	x	x	9,681	13,040	37,924	x	x	1.29%	1.63%	4.40%
Hispanic or Latino (any race)	14,217	32,940	50,864	75,422	111,902	2.20%	4.64%	6.77%	9.44%	12.98%
Total	646,352	709,705	750,963	798,552	862,111	100.00%	100.00%	100.00%	100.00%	100.00%

=== American Community Survey 2025 data ===
The United States Census Bureau estimated that in 2025, Worcester County’s population was 888.502. It was also estimated that the county's population was 69,60% Non-Hispanic White, 14,80% Hispanic or Latino, 6,25% Non-Hispanic Black, 6,23% Asian, 0,14% Native American, 0,03% Pacific Islander, and 2,95% Multiracial.

Total	Population	Percentage
Non-Hispanic White	618.364	69,60%
Hispanic or Latino	131.521	14,80%
Non-Hispanic Black	55.557	6,25%
Asian	55.318	6,23%
Native American	1.276	0,14%
Pacific Islander	226	0,03%
Non-Hispanic Multiracial	26.240	2,95%

=== 2010 census ===
At the 2010 census, there were 798,552 people, 303,080 households, and 202,602 families in the county. The population density was 528.6 inhabitants per square mile (204.1/km^{2}). There were 326,788 housing units at an average density of 216.3 per square mile (83.5/km^{2}). The racial makeup of the county was 85.6% white, 4.2% black or African American, 4.0% Asian, 0.2% American Indian, 3.6% from other races, and 2.3% from two or more races. Those of Hispanic or Latino origin made up 9.4% of the population. In terms of ancestry, 22.2% were Irish, 15.1% were French as well as 6.7% French Canadians, 14.4% were Italian, 11.7% were English, 7.0% were Polish, 6.9% were German, and 3.2% were American.

Of the 303,080 households, 33.7% had children under the age of 18 living with them, 50.0% were married couples living together, 12.2% had a female householder with no husband present, 33.2% were non-families, and 26.2% of households were made up of individuals. The average household size was 2.55 and the average family size was 3.09. The median age was 39.2 years.

The median household income was $64,152 and the median family income was $79,121. Males had a median income of $56,880 versus $42,223 for females. The per capita income for the county was $30,557. About 6.9% of families and 9.5% of the population were below the poverty line, including 12.1% of those under age 18 and 9.0% of those age 65 or over.

=== 2000 census ===
At the 2000 census, there were 750,963 people, 283,927 households, and 192,502 families in the county. The population density was 496 inhabitants per square mile (192/km^{2}). There were 298,159 housing units at an average density of 197 per square mile (76/km^{2}). The racial makeup of the county was 89.61% White, 2.73% Black or African American, 0.25% Native American, 2.62% Asian, 0.04% Pacific Islander, 2.93% from other races, and 1.82% from two or more races. 6.77%. were Hispanic or Latino of any race. 15.9% were of Irish, 12.3% Italian, 11.7% French, 8.0% French Canadian, 8.0% English, 5.6% Polish and 5.0% American ancestry according to Census 2000. 85.1% spoke English, 6.1% Spanish and 1.9% French as their first language.

Of the 283,927 households, 33.6% had children under the age of 18 living with them, 52.5% were married couples living together, 11.4% had a female householder with no husband present, and 32.2% were non-families. In addition, 26.2% of all households were made up of individuals, and 10.4% had someone living alone who was 65 years of age or older. The average household size was 2.56, and the average family size was 3.11.

The age distribution was 25.60% under the age of 18, 8.40% from 18 to 24, 31.10% from 25 to 44, 21.80% from 45 to 64, and 13.00% 65 or older. The median age was 36 years. For every 100 females, there were 95.50 males. For every 100 females age 18 and over, there were 92.10 males.

The median household income was $47,874 and the median family income was $58,394. Males had a median income of $42,261 versus $30,516 for females. The per capita income for the county was $22,983. About 6.80% of families and 9.20% of the population were below the poverty line, including 11.30% of those under age 18 and 9.50% of those age 65 or over.

=== Demographic breakdown by town ===
==== Income ====
The ranking of unincorporated communities that are included on the list are reflective of the census designated locations and villages were included as cities or towns. Data is from the 2007-2011 American Community Survey 5-Year Estimates.

Rank	Town		Per capita income	Median household income	Median family income	Population	Number of households
1	Southborough	Town	$57,436	$142,520	$161,419	9,671	3,285
2	Bolton	Town	$52,282	$137,120	$149,120	4,827	1,583
3	Boylston	Town	$52,129	$91,734	$110,321	4,320	1,676
	Cordaville	CDP	$51,707	$151,836	$175,217	2,558	845
4	Harvard	Town	$50,971	$142,411	$161,250	6,483	1,822
5	Northborough	Town	$47,953	$104,420	$122,592	14,180	5,114
6	Westborough	Town	$46,631	$99,394	$127,052	18,285	6,720
7	Sterling	Town	$44,089	$102,270	$117,240	7,768	2,811
8	Princeton	Town	$43,836	$108,319	$123,864	3,412	1,253
9	Sutton	Town	$43,275	$107,500	$116,288	8,908	3,128
10	Upton	Town	$43,252	$110,083	$132,703	7,364	2,588
11	Berlin	Town	$41,503	$94,712	$99,375	2,819	1,029
	Sturbridge	CDP	$41,479	$77,692	$93,167	2,027	860
	Westborough	CDP	$40,901	$71,731	$87,375	3,883	1,590
12	Mendon	Town	$40,523	$93,245	$108,173	5,787	2,055
13	Hopedale	Town	$40,422	$98,220	$104,398	5,909	2,275
	Barre	CDP	$39,556	$77,602	$102,650	1,053	418
14	Grafton	Town	$39,479	$89,950	$109,729	17,472	6,376
	Northborough	CDP	$39,266	$89,033	$108,636	6,226	2,381
	Hopedale	CDP	$38,687	$88,974	$101,280	3,947	1,590
15	Holden	Town	$38,639	$89,660	$104,928	17,197	6,296
16	Shrewsbury	Town	$38,223	$88,985	$104,035	35,269	13,095
17	Sturbridge	Town	$37,480	$79,044	$98,693	9,133	3,655
18	Paxton	Town	$37,328	$105,072	$106,625	4,767	1,591
	Upton	CDP	$37,247	$92,676	$120,962	2,867	1,099
19	Douglas	Town	$35,931	$81,000	$97,383	8,342	3,206
20	Lunenburg	Town	$35,868	$83,265	$95,000	10,034	3,728
	Massachusetts	State	$35,051	$65,981	$83,371	6,512,227	2,522,409
	Lunenburg	CDP	$34,770	$73,750	$79,750	1,217	470
21	Lancaster	Town	$34,374	$87,962	$101,196	7,896	2,426
22	Uxbridge	Town	$34,346	$86,912	$94,830	13,233	4,931
23	Barre	Town	$33,647	$73,687	$93,250	5,383	2,065
24	Millbury	Town	$33,467	$77,883	$86,855	13,250	5,166
25	Auburn	Town	$33,447	$73,559	$87,958	16,183	6,318
26	Charlton	Town	$33,250	$91,653	$98,789	12,827	4,306
27	Blackstone	Town	$32,988	$73,586	$87,752	9,028	3,472
	South Lancaster	CDP	$32,942	$70,625	$81,167	1,988	766
28	Ashburnham	Town	$32,880	$81,842	$98,056	6,033	2,184
29	Hubbardston	Town	$32,618	$83,333	$95,203	4,341	1,538
30	New Braintree	Town	$32,568	$88,571	$93,458	1,124	380
31	Milford	Town	$32,219	$64,860	$80,127	27,925	10,493
32	Royalston	Town	$32,031	$59,609	$73,125	1,058	455
33	Hardwick	Town	$31,974	$61,298	$72,458	2,953	1,153
	Worcester County	County	$31,470	$65,772	$81,342	794,981	299,089
34	Westminster	Town	$31,391	$78,632	$82,596	7,250	2,611
	East Brookfield	CDP	$31,316	$66,339	$84,550	1,270	479
35	Oakham	Town	$31,237	$79,700	$83,676	1,822	680
36	Rutland	Town	$30,961	$83,734	$101,486	7,812	2,558
37	Northbridge	Town	$30,945	$68,981	$87,359	15,475	5,538
	Milford	CDP	$30,678	$60,840	$72,927	25,194	9,494
38	Clinton	Town	$30,563	$61,796	$77,964	13,614	5,672
39	Leicester	Town	$30,301	$72,471	$80,288	10,934	3,858
	Fiskdale	CDP	$30,230	$75,655	$89,595	2,907	1,133
40	Oxford	Town	$30,149	$68,567	$83,161	13,702	5,343
41	North Brookfield	Town	$30,106	$64,009	$76,690	4,686	1,931
42	West Brookfield	Town	$29,782	$62,685	$84,868	3,730	1,488
	East Douglas	CDP	$29,760	$73,372	$74,828	2,835	1,146
43	Spencer	Town	$29,687	$59,420	$77,384	11,715	4,686
44	East Brookfield	Town	$29,416	$62,350	$82,750	2,058	737
45	Brookfield	Town	$29,392	$62,390	$77,993	3,363	1,353
46	Millville	Town	$29,049	$73,426	$84,000	3,154	1,060
	West Brookfield	CDP	$28,704	$56,625	$95,556	1,853	705
47	West Boylston	Town	$28,547	$73,600	$89,681	7,660	2,308
48	Leominster	City	$28,445	$58,585	$73,704	40,884	16,095
49	Phillipston	Town	$28,273	$74,043	$75,234	1,894	648
	North Brookfield	CDP	$28,163	$50,346	$64,181	2,035	912
50	Warren	Town	$28,112	$51,188	$69,873	5,106	2,067
	Oxford	CDP	$27,990	$67,054	$79,832	6,566	2,418
	United States	Country	$27,915	$52,762	$64,293	306,603,772	114,761,359
	South Ashburnham	CDP	$27,758	$76,932	$77,386	1,104	345
51	Petersham	Town	$27,475	$65,781	$81,250	1,263	445
52	Webster	Town	$27,430	$49,621	$65,204	16,752	7,344
53	Dudley	Town	$27,319	$72,500	$78,920	11,276	3,780
	Whitinsville	CDP	$27,135	$58,846	$62,314	6,894	2,424
	Spencer	CDP	$27,059	$47,183	$66,932	5,392	2,417
54	Templeton	Town	$26,891	$70,116	$75,753	7,896	2,846
	Baldwinville	CDP	$26,585	$66,700	$77,061	2,061	750
	Clinton	CDP	$26,256	$54,514	$72,859	7,492	3,032
	Rutland	CDP	$25,987	$62,500	$78,929	2,352	758
55	Winchendon	Town	$25,845	$58,137	$73,162	10,250	3,743
	Warren	CDP	$25,245	$41,200	$71,722	1,408	564
56	Gardner	City	$24,974	$48,108	$63,413	20,323	8,037
57	Worcester	City	$24,544	$45,846	$55,927	180,519	70,248
58	Athol	Town	$24,384	$50,866	$59,095	11,576	4,551
	Webster	CDP	$24,109	$43,702	$53,145	11,682	5,195
59	Fitchburg	City	$24,061	$48,064	$55,293	40,286	14,741
60	Southbridge	City	$21,923	$43,965	$52,577	16,800	6,548
	Winchendon	CDP	$21,914	$36,711	$52,868	3,860	1,638
	Athol	CDP	$21,553	$47,330	$52,139	7,867	3,150
	Devens	CDP	$13,933	$72,986	$73,194	1,704	113

== Government and politics ==
State government
State Representative(s):	by community
State Senator(s):	by community
Governor's Councilor(s):	Paul M. DePalo (D)
Federal government
U.S. Representative(s):	by Congressional district
U.S. Senators:	Elizabeth Warren (D), Ed Markey (D)

Worcester County is one of the 8 (of the total of 14) Massachusetts counties that have had no county government or county commissioners since July 1, 1998, when county functions were assumed by state agencies at local option following a change in state law. The county has an elected county sheriff, county prosecutor, and court officials, administered under the state department of public safety. The state correctional system in the county is known as the Worcester County Jail or "House of Corrections" at West Boylston, and the Worcester County District courts (state administered) are housed at Worcester, Fitchburg, and other district courts within county boundaries. The Worcester County district attorney is a county-wide position, though the district excludes the town of Athol. In Massachusetts, Sheriffs have more limited roles than most states and are responsible for corrections, court service and bailiffs and jail release programs. County Sheriffs in Massachusetts are elected to six-year terms. The Worcester County Sheriff is Lewis Evangelidis (R), and the Worcester County District Attorney is Joseph Early Jr. (D) (see the info-box for elected officials at county level). The Worcester County Conservation District has countywide boundaries. The county has a regional planning commission.

Massachusetts law allows regional compacts, traditional counties and other governmental entities. Traditional County governments in the state include Norfolk, Bristol, Dukes, Nantucket, and Plymouth Counties. Barnstable County, which is Cape Cod, functions as a modern regional county government. Suffolk County, which is mainly Boston, is under the Boston City Council. The Massachusetts General Laws describe this relationship of county government and the options for abolishing county governments and/or chartering regional governmental compacts in subchapter 34 B. Four other new county compacts have been created by the state legislature in Hampshire, Franklin, Barnstable Counties, and a regional planning council level for Berkshire County. Thus 9 of 14 Counties have some form of county regional governments. Worcester County could exercise that option if it chooses, such as for public safety and/or preparedness due to its rather large geography, by a request to and a special act of the legislature, by local referendum, or by one of three mechanisms. See the references for the state statute, and the League of Women Voters link.

Voter registration and party enrollment as of October 17, 2018
Party	Number of voters	Percentage
Democratic	142,910	26.10%
Republican	66,689	12.18%
Unenrolled	329,232	60.12%
Minor Parties	2,231	0.41%
Total	547,585	100%

United States presidential election results for Worcester County, Massachusetts
Year	Republican		Democratic		Third party(ies)	
Year	No.	%	No.	%	No.	%
1868	19,860	76.77%	6,009	23.23%	0	0.00%
1872	19,827	73.49%	7,153	26.51%	0	0.00%
1876	22,054	60.43%	14,319	39.23%	123	0.34%
1880	23,040	63.17%	12,852	35.24%	583	1.60%
1884	21,661	55.32%	12,712	32.47%	4,783	12.22%
1888	25,005	56.27%	17,930	40.35%	1,502	3.38%
1892	27,130	54.84%	20,797	42.04%	1,544	3.12%
1896	35,579	73.37%	10,855	22.38%	2,059	4.25%
1900	32,412	62.84%	17,148	33.24%	2,022	3.92%
1904	34,124	63.83%	17,037	31.87%	2,300	4.30%
1908	34,394	62.06%	16,803	30.32%	4,228	7.63%
1912	24,719	42.06%	17,565	29.88%	16,492	28.06%
1916	32,541	52.76%	27,540	44.65%	1,599	2.59%
1920	81,241	68.63%	34,667	29.29%	2,464	2.08%
1924	89,679	67.14%	31,171	23.34%	12,726	9.53%
1928	94,290	52.09%	85,675	47.33%	1,045	0.58%
1932	88,535	49.08%	87,586	48.55%	4,281	2.37%
1936	85,316	40.48%	114,136	54.15%	11,312	5.37%
1940	100,468	42.92%	132,541	56.62%	1,099	0.47%
1944	98,414	44.28%	123,440	55.54%	404	0.18%
1948	106,757	43.62%	133,823	54.68%	4,177	1.71%
1952	146,094	53.00%	128,898	46.76%	645	0.23%
1956	163,401	60.10%	107,889	39.68%	580	0.21%
1960	112,730	39.37%	173,103	60.46%	500	0.17%
1964	61,388	22.60%	209,383	77.08%	860	0.32%
1968	88,354	33.32%	168,437	63.52%	8,388	3.16%
1972	127,560	46.70%	144,139	52.77%	1,428	0.52%
1976	105,217	36.89%	172,320	60.41%	7,708	2.70%
1980	120,100	43.11%	117,326	42.12%	41,135	14.77%
1984	156,060	56.45%	119,498	43.23%	882	0.32%
1988	148,365	50.59%	141,485	48.25%	3,406	1.16%
1992	101,984	32.30%	138,122	43.74%	75,676	23.96%
1996	87,021	29.84%	169,892	58.26%	34,704	11.90%
2000	114,139	36.80%	173,769	56.03%	22,240	7.17%
2004	144,094	42.30%	192,142	56.41%	4,400	1.29%
2008	152,101	41.83%	202,107	55.59%	9,386	2.58%
2012	163,390	44.27%	198,244	53.71%	7,478	2.03%
2016	157,682	40.44%	198,778	50.98%	33,491	8.59%
2020	171,683	39.74%	248,773	57.58%	11,558	2.68%
2024	183,802	43.67%	225,680	53.63%	11,359	2.70%

== Communities ==
The entire area of Worcester County is incorporated into cities and towns. The U.S. census also defines places inside one or more towns for statistical purposes. On this map, cities are shaded in gray.

=== Cities ===
- Fitchburg
- Gardner
- Leominster
- Southbridge
- Worcester (traditional county seat)

=== Towns ===
- Ashburnham
- Athol
- Auburn
- Barre
- Berlin
- Blackstone
- Bolton
- Boylston
- Brookfield
- Charlton
- Clinton
- Douglas
- Dudley
- East Brookfield
- Grafton
- Hardwick
- Harvard
- Holden
- Hopedale
- Hubbardston
- Lancaster
- Leicester
- Lunenburg
- Mendon
- Milford
- Millbury
- Millville
- New Braintree
- North Brookfield
- Northborough
- Northbridge
- Oakham
- Oxford
- Paxton
- Petersham
- Phillipston
- Princeton
- Royalston
- Rutland
- Shrewsbury
- Southborough
- Spencer
- Sterling
- Sturbridge
- Sutton
- Templeton
- Upton
- Uxbridge
- Warren
- Webster
- West Boylston
- West Brookfield
- Westborough
- Westminster
- Winchendon

=== Census-designated places ===
- Athol
- Baldwinville
- Barre
- Brookfield
- Clinton
- Cordaville
- Devens
- East Brookfield
- East Douglas
- Fiskdale
- Hopedale
- Lunenburg
- Milford
- North Brookfield
- Northborough
- Oxford
- Petersham
- Rutland
- South Ashburnham
- South Lancaster
- Spencer
- Sturbridge
- Upton
- Warren
- Webster
- West Brookfield
- West Warren
- Westborough
- Whitinsville
- Winchendon

=== Other unincorporated communities ===
- Chapinville
- Cherry Valley
- East Millbury
- East Princeton
- Farnumsville (also called South Grafton)
- Fisherville
- Gilbertville
- Hardwick
- Ironstone (also known as South Uxbridge)
- Jefferson
- Leicester Center
- Linwood
- Manchuag
- Morningdale
- North Grafton
- North Uxbridge
- Oakdale
- Old Furnace
- Otter River
- Pitcherville
- Rochdale
- Rockdale
- Saundersville
- Spindleville
- Still River
- Stoneville
- West Sutton
- West Upton
- Whalom
- Wheelockville
- Wheelwright
- Winchendon Springs

== Ghost town ==
- Dana, disincorporated due to the creation of the Quabbin Reservoir

== Transportation ==
=== Major highways ===
- I-84
- I-90 / Mass Pike
- I-190
- I-290
- I-395
- I-495
- US 20
- US 202
- Route 2
  - Route 2A
- Route 9
- Route 12
- Route 13
- Route 16
- Route 19
- Route 30
- Route 31
- Route 32
  - Route 32A
- Route 49
- Route 56
- Route 62
- Route 67
- Route 68
- Route 70
- Route 85
- Route 96
- Route 98
- Route 101
- Route 109
- Route 110
- Route 111
- Route 117
- Route 119
- Route 122
  - Route 122A
- Route 131
- Route 135
- Route 140
- Route 146
  - Route 146A
- Route 148
- Route 169
- Route 193
- Route 197
- Route 198
- Route 225

== Notable people ==
- Louisa May Alcott, novelist, daughter of Amos Alcott
- Johnny Appleseed, real name Jonathan Chapman
- Mike Barnicle, newspaper writer
- Clara Barton, founder of the American Red Cross
- Michael Beasley, NBA player, high school All-American; attended Notre Dame Preparatory School
- Robert Benchley, writer, theater critic, actor, humorist, and member of the Algonquin Round Table
- H. Jon Benjamin, actor and comedian
- Ezra T. Benson, Mormon pioneer, missionary, Quorum of Twelve, and Utah territorial legislator
- Ken Bouchard and Ron Bouchard, NASCAR drivers
- Luther Burbank, horticulturalist; developed russet potato used in French fries by McDonald's
- William Cullen Bryant, poet, journalist and editor of the New York Evening Post
- Effingham Capron, woolen and cotton mill scion who liberated slaves from the 1830s; led local, state and US anti slavery societies
- George M. Cohan, entertainer, playwright, composer, lyricist, actor, singer, dancer, director
- Robert Cormier, novelist and columnist
- Ron Darling, professional baseball pitcher, World Series player; local St. Johns High School star from Millbury, born in Honolulu
- Dorothea Dix, social reformer; activist
- Ralph Earl, famous portrait painter, artist of early America
- Fannie Farmer, cookbook author
- Abby Kelley Foster, radical abolitionist, women's suffrage
- Rich Gedman, professional baseball player, catcher for the Boston Red Sox
- Robert H. Goddard, father of American rocketry
- Ryan Gomes, NBA player; attended Notre Dame Preparatory School
- Gabby Hartnett, greatest baseball catcher before Johnny Bench
- Abbie Hoffman, activist
- Elias Howe, invented the sewing machine
- Elliott P. Joslin, pioneer diabetes researcher and clinician; founded Joslin Clinic
- Walker Lewis, black abolitionist, Masonic Grand Master of African Grand Lodge #1, Mormon elder
- Connie Mack, baseball great and long-time baseball manager
- Nora Marlowe, character actress; best known for role on The Waltons
- Agnes Moorehead, actress
- William T. G. Morton, contributor to modern anaesthesia
- Francis Patrick O'Connor, associate justice on Massachusetts Supreme Court
- Frank O'Hara, avant-garde poet and playwright
- Jeannine Oppewall, Hollywood producer, film art, four Academy Award nominations including Bridges of Madison County
- Joe Perry, songwriter and guitarist with Aerosmith; he was from Hopedale, and played his first gig at Mendon
- Amos Singletary, Anti-Federalist mill operator, justice for the peace, and state representative
- Brian Skerry, underwater photographer for National Geographic
- Steve Spagnuolo, current defensive coordinator for the Kansas City Chiefs, former head coach of the St. Louis Rams, former defensive coordinator for the New York Giants
- Lysander Spooner, pamphleteer, lawyer, abolitionist and political theorist
- Lucy Stone, famous suffragist, women's rights advocate, abolitionist, public speaker, first woman college grad in Massachusetts; first woman to retain her own name after marriage
- Lydia Chapin Taft, America's first woman voter; first colonial woman who voted legally in America
- Earl Tupper, a New Hampshire native, who pioneered Tupperware in Farnumsville, South Grafton, in the 1940s
- Hiram Walker, distillery founder
- Artemas Ward, major general of the American Revolution; the first Supreme Allied Commander of the Continental Army
- Daniel B. Wesson, co-founder of Smith & Wesson, a major firearm manufacturer
- Eli Whitney, invented the cotton gin
- Scott Young, NHL professional hockey player, two-time Stanley Cup champion, United States Olympian; attended St. Mark's and Boston University
- Geoffrey Zakarian, Iron Chef and restaurateur

== See also ==
- List of Massachusetts locations by per capita income
- List of counties in Massachusetts
- Registry of Deeds (Massachusetts) Worcester County District Registry of Deeds
- National Register of Historic Places listings in Worcester County, Massachusetts
