= Clinton (CDP), Massachusetts =

Clinton, Massachusetts
- CDP
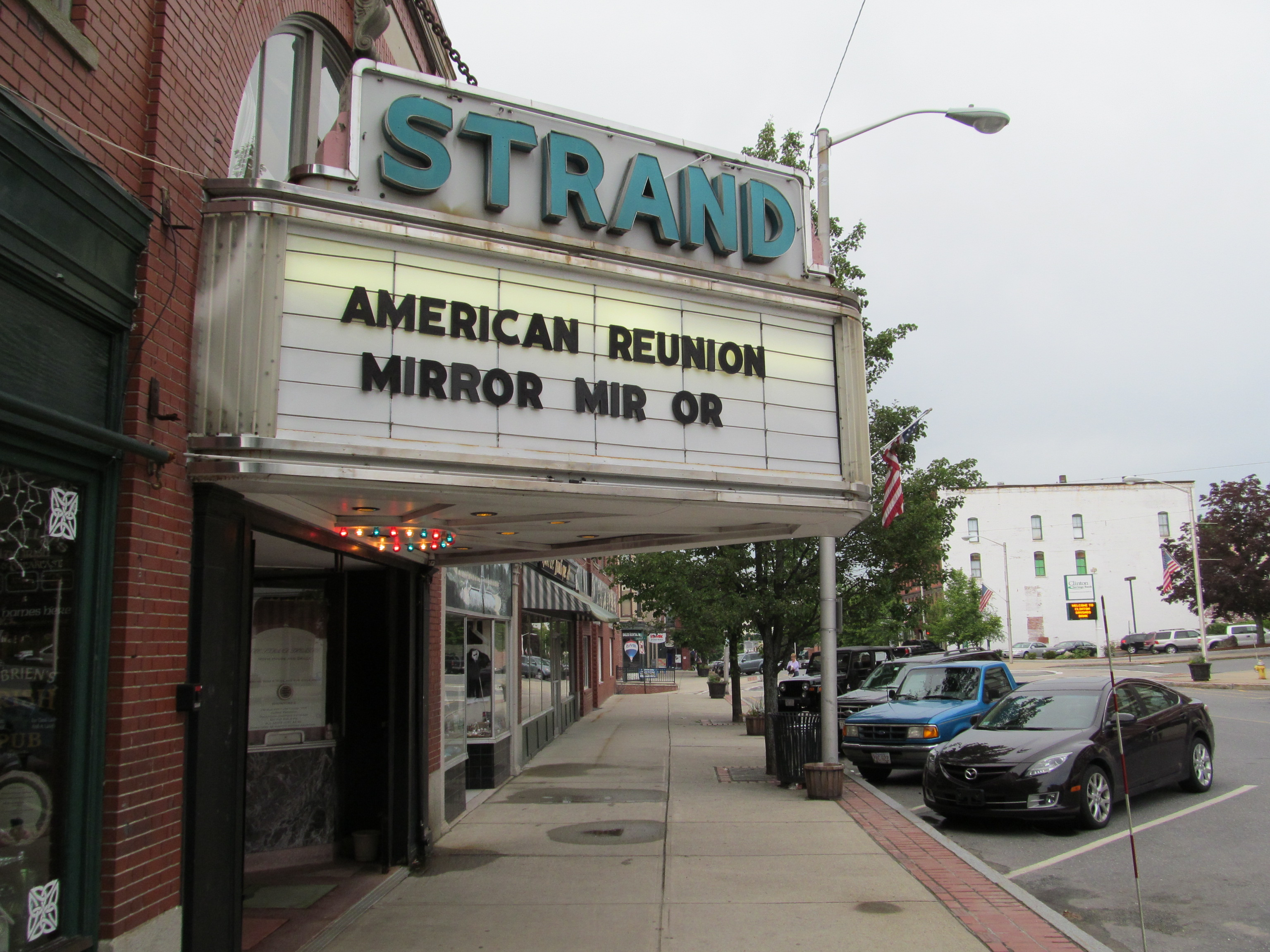
- Strand Theatre

- Location in Worcester County and the state of Massachusetts.
- Coordinates: 42°25′15″N 71°41′10″W
- Country: United States
- State: Massachusetts
- County: Worcester

Area
  - Total: 1.49 sq mi (3.87 km^{2})
  - Land: 1.49 sq mi (3.87 km^{2})
  - Water: 0.0039 sq mi (0.01 km^{2})
- Elevation: 367 ft (112 m)

Population (2020)
  - Total: 8,166
  - Density: 5,471.1/sq mi (2,112.39/km^{2})
- Time zone: UTC-5 (Eastern (EST))
  - Summer (DST): UTC-4 (EDT)
- ZIP code: 01510
- Area code: 978
- FIPS code: 25-14430
- GNIS feature ID: 0610841

Clinton is a census-designated place (CDP) in the town of Clinton in Worcester County, Massachusetts, United States. The population was 7,389 at the 2010 census.

== Geography ==
Clinton is located at 42°25′15″N 71°41′10″W (42.420935, -71.686149).

According to the United States Census Bureau, the CDP has a total area of 3.9 km^{2} (1.5 sq mi), all land.

== Demographics ==
Historical population
Census	Pop.	Note	%±
2020	8,166		—
U.S. Decennial Census

As of the census of 2000, there were 7,884 people, 3,360 households, and 1,942 families residing in the CDP. The population density was 2,029.4 people/km^{2} (5,256 people/mi^{2}). There were 3,529 housing units at an average density of 908.4 units/km^{2} (2,353 units/mi^{2}). The racial makeup of the CDP was 89.62% White, 2.32% Black or African American, 0.25% Native American, 0.76% Asian, 0.06% Pacific Islander, 4.90% from other races, and 2.08% from two or more races. Hispanic or Latino of any race were 11.07% of the population.

There were 3,360 households, out of which 26.4% had children under the age of 18 living with them, 40.3% were married couples living together, 12.8% had a female householder with no husband present, and 42.2% were non-families. 35.1% of all households were made up of individuals, and 14.3% had someone living alone who was 65 years of age or older. The average household size was 2.33 and the average family size was 3.05.

In the CDP, the population was spread out, with 22.1% under the age of 18, 8.1% from 18 to 24, 33.2% from 25 to 44, 21.0% from 45 to 64, and 15.6% who were 65 years of age or older. The median age was 37 years. For every 100 females, there were 94.5 males. For every 100 females age 18 and over, there were 90.8 males.

The median income for a household in the CDP was $43,570, and the median income for a family was $52,686. Males had a median income of $36,920 versus $27,039 for females. The per capita income for the CDP was $21,857. About 5.3% of families and 7.9% of the population were below the poverty line, including 5.6% of those under age 18 and 14.7% of those age 65 or over.
