= Quaboag Plantation =

- Plantation
- Territory: English America
- Province: Massachusetts Bay Colony
- Settled: 1660
- Incorporated (as Brookfield): 1673
- Time zone: UTC-5 (Eastern)
  - Summer (DST): Eastern

Quaboag Plantation was a plantation founded in 1660 in Central Massachusetts that now makes up parts of the towns of Warren and New Braintree, as well as the whole towns of Brookfield, West Brookfield, North Brookfield, and East Brookfield. In 1673, the plantation broke up as the various towns that made up its land became incorporated.

== History ==
Back as early as 1636, William Pynchon began to have personal and business relationships with the Quaboag Indians (whom the settlement is named after) that lasted 40 years. In 1660, his son John took over business at his Springfield plantation and wanted to build a new plantation that was about halfway between Boston and Springfield, to shorten a long trip that was normally done by ship. John purchased the land in what is now the lands of the Brookfields, Warren, and New Braintree. 20 families from Ipswich, Massachusetts came to settle the new land for the Colony. A garrison was built as well to protect the Europeans from the Natives. The nearest towns at the time were Springfield, a 25-mile journey through the wilderness, and Concord which was 44 miles away. As more and more settlers came from all over Massachusetts Bay Colony, the town eventually became incorporated as the "Township of Brookfield". Two years later though, the town was abandoned after it was ransacked by the Indians fighting for King Philip's War. In 1686, the court was willing to reopen expansion back into the Brookfields and it has been growing ever since.

The name Quaboag is currently used for the Quaboag River, the Quaboag Marathon and other such things around the Brookfield region.
