= Upton Center Historic District =

Historic district in Massachusetts, United States

- U.S. National Register of Historic Places
- U.S. Historic district
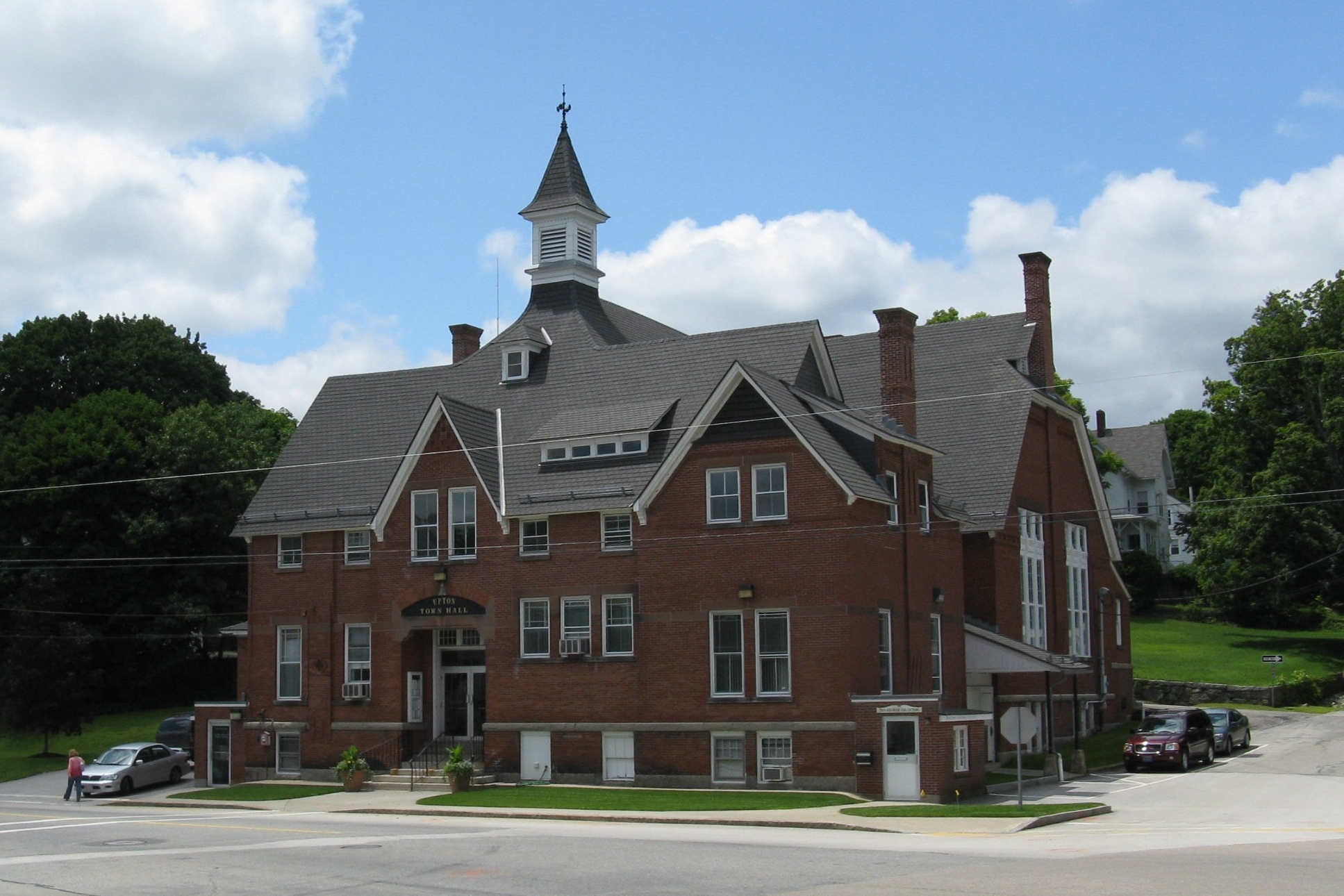
- Upton Town Hall (built 1884)

- Location within Massachusetts Location within the United States
- Location: Upton, Massachusetts
- Coordinates: 42°10′26″N 71°36′11″W
- Area: 73 acres (30 ha)
- NRHP reference No.: 14001150
- Added to NRHP: January 14, 2015

The Upton Center Historic District encompasses the historic center of the town of Upton, Massachusetts. Its main focus is Central Square, located near a complex series of junctions involving Main, North Main, Milford, Grove, Church, and Warren Streets. This area, the site of the town green, was where its first meetinghouse was built, and is still the center of civic and religious life in the community. Notable buildings include the 1884 Town Hall, and three churches (Congregational, Roman Catholic, and Methodist), all dating to the mid-19th century. The district also includes a residential area to the south of Central Square.

The district was listed on the National Register of Historic Places in 2014.

== See also ==
- National Register of Historic Places listings in Worcester County, Massachusetts
