= Warren Town Hall =

- U.S. National Register of Historic Places
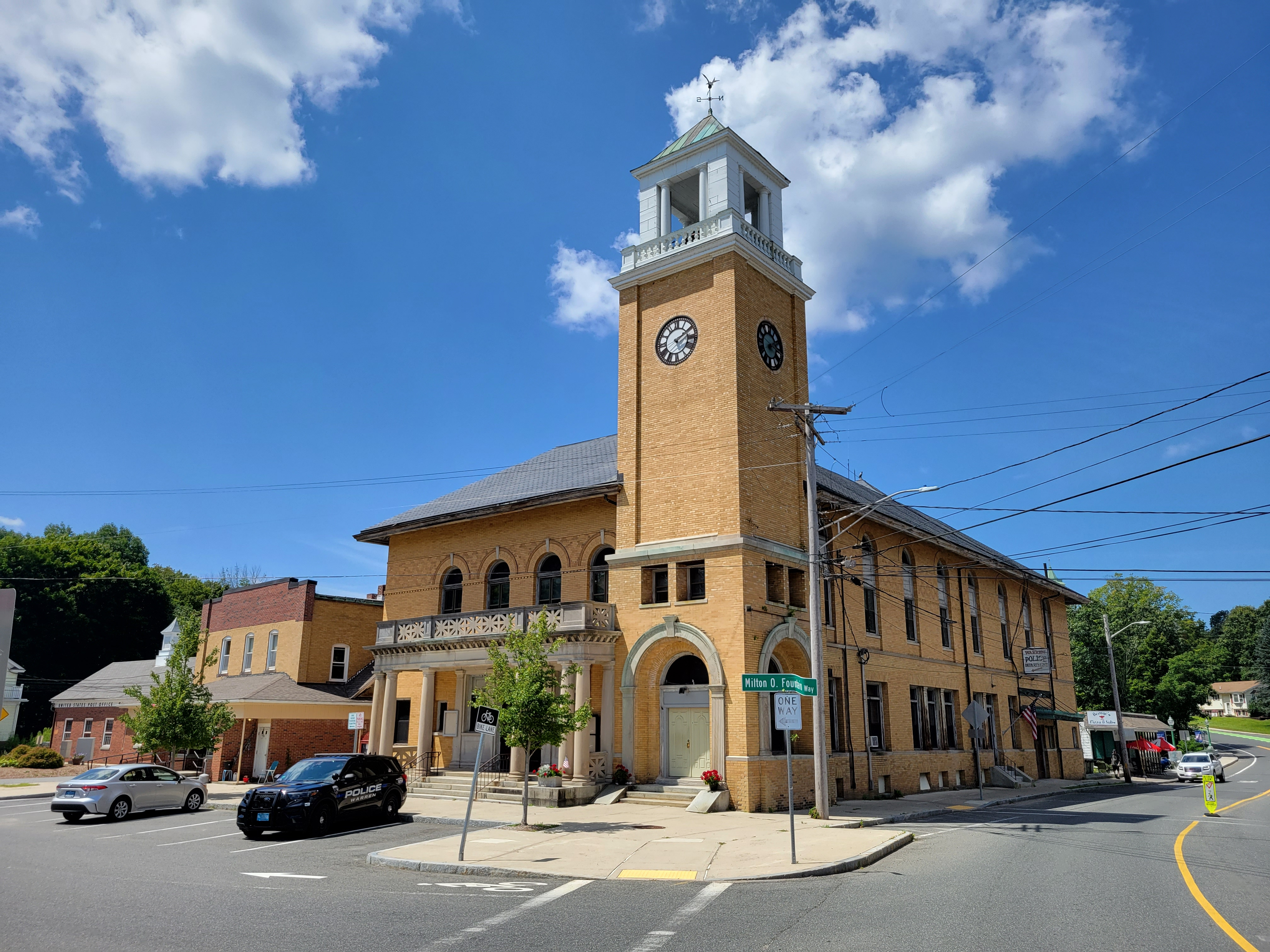
- Warren Town Hall

- Location within Massachusetts Location within the United States
- Location: 1 Main Street, Warren, Massachusetts
- Coordinates: 42°12′46″N 72°11′43″W
- Built: 1900
- Architect: Henry Hyde Dwight, Howland Shaw Chandler
- Architectural style: Late 19th And 20th Century Revivals
- NRHP reference No.: 01000650
- Added to NRHP: June 14, 2001

Warren Town Hall is a historic town hall in Warren, Massachusetts. The Renaissance Revival structure was built in 1900 to a design by Henry Hyde Dwight. The previous town hall, an 1879 Richardsonian Romanesque building was heavily damaged by fire, and its shell formed part of the framework for the new building. The old building was faced in buff-colored brick and extended a further thirty feet, making the building 115 feet (35 m) long and 55 feet (17 m) wide. The old building's north tower was completely rebuilt, and the building's interior was completely new. The main entrance is sheltered by a portico supported by six Doric columns.

The building has had a preservation restriction on it since 1999 and it was listed in the National Register of Historic Places in 2001.

== See also ==
- National Register of Historic Places listings in Worcester County, Massachusetts
