= Merrimac Hat Company =

Former hat manufacturer

The Merrimac Hat Company was a prominent manufacturer of hats from the 1860s until the 1950s, employing up to 500 people in its manufacturing facilities in Amesbury, Massachusetts and another 1,500 in facilities from Alabama to Nova Scotia. Vintage hats of the Merrimac Hat Company are displayed at the Salisbury Point Railroad & Hat Museum in Amesbury.

== History ==
In 1838 Issac Martin began the manufacture of hats in a small facility on his farm in Amesbury, Massachusetts. In 1860 he entered into a partnership with Abner L. Bailey and a small mill was constructed near Bailey's Pond in Amesbury, which was dammed to allow water for its boilers and wet finishing process. From 1860 to 1866 the company was known as Amesbury Hat and Horton Hat, but from 1866 the name Merrimac Hat Company became permanent. At the height of its success in the 1940s, the company was the largest manufacturer of trimmed hats and hat bodies in the country.

== Decline ==
Although "this company was easily the most prosperous of all of Amesbury's industries", the change in men's fashion after World War II dramatically reduced the demand for formal hats. The company struggled for a few decades before closing for good in 1970. Its facilities near the intersection of Beacon and Merrimack Street remained shuttered until the late 1980s when they began to be converted into luxury condominiums, a process that is still ongoing in 2018.

== See also ==
- Knowlton Hat Factory
