= Warren, Massachusetts =

Human settlement in USA started 1664

- Town
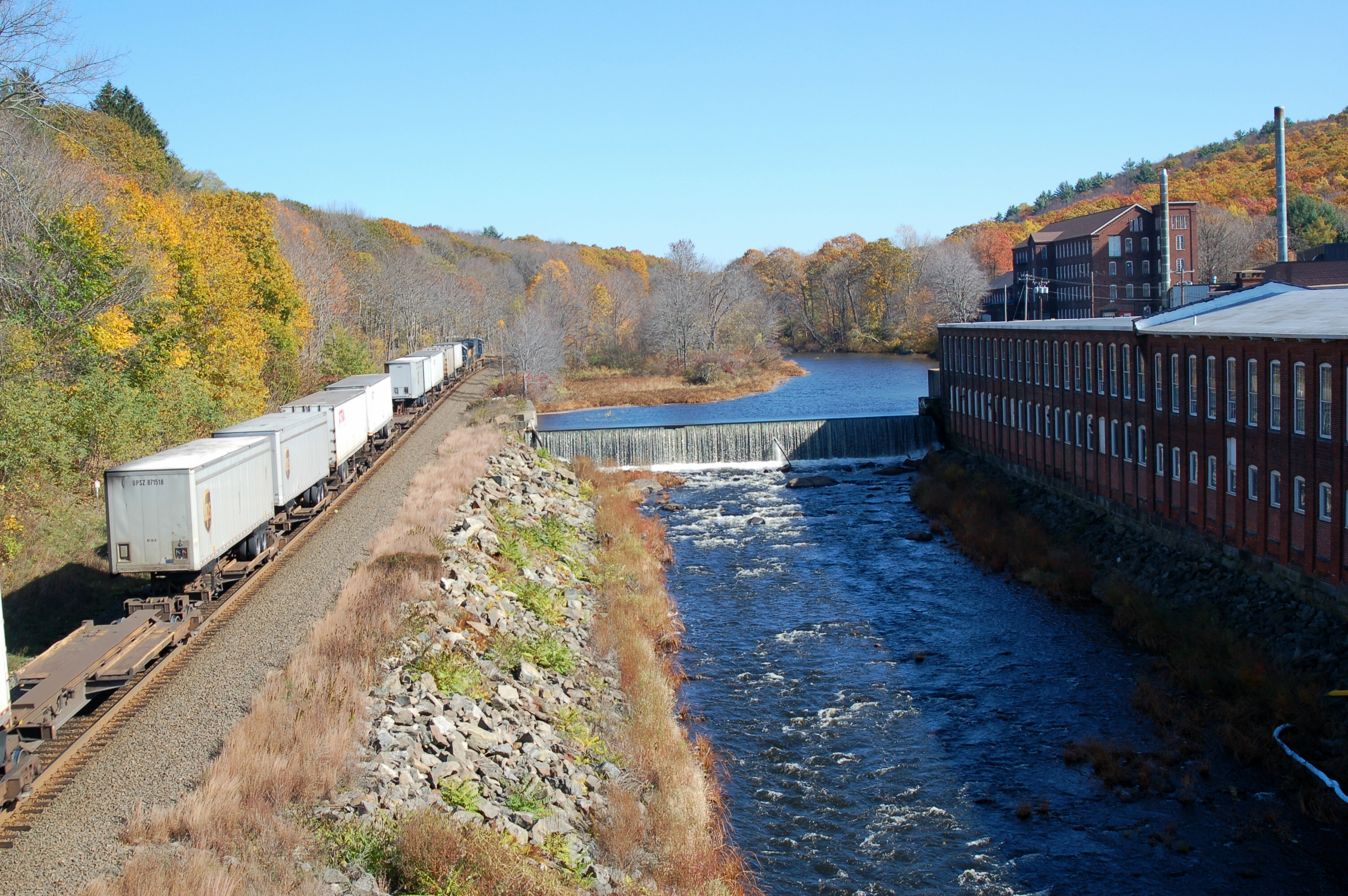
- Historical West Warren

- Seal

- Location in Worcester County and the state of Massachusetts.
- Coordinates: 42°12′45″N 72°11′30″W
- Country: United States
- State: Massachusetts
- County: Worcester
- Settled: 1664
- Incorporated: 1742
- Renamed: 1834
- Named for: Joseph Warren

Government
  - Type: Open town meeting

Area
  - Total: 27.6 sq mi (71.5 km^{2})
  - Land: 27.5 sq mi (71.3 km^{2})
  - Water: 0.077 sq mi (0.2 km^{2})
- Elevation: 604 ft (184 m)

Population (2020)
  - Total: 4,975
  - Density: 181/sq mi (69.8/km^{2})
- Time zone: UTC−5 (Eastern)
  - Summer (DST): UTC−4 (Eastern)
- ZIP Codes: 01083 (Warren); 01092 (West Warren)
- Area code: 413
- FIPS code: 25-73090
- GNIS feature ID: 0618388
- Website: www.warren-ma.gov

Warren is a town in Worcester County, Massachusetts, United States. The population was 4,975 at the 2020 census. The town contains the villages of Warren and West Warren.

== History ==
Warren was first settled in 1664 and was officially incorporated on January 16, 1741, as the town of Western.

Originally a part of Quaboag Plantation, the town now known as Warren was part of Brookfield for 68 years until it was renamed Western. Warren includes land petitioned from both the Quaboag Plantation and the "Kingsfield", which included parts of Palmer and Brimfield.

On March 13, 1834, the town was renamed Warren in honor of General Joseph Warren, who died at the Battle of Bunker Hill during the American Revolutionary War. The need to rename the town came about due to confusion of the name "Western" with the town of Weston, Massachusetts. According to the History of Warren Massachusetts by Olney I. Darling, Western was renamed Warren due to "countless mistakes in the transmission of the mails." On January 13, 1834, a town meeting was held to discuss a name change. Shortly thereafter, the town petitioned the legislature to change the name, which was soon done, and the first town meeting under the name "Warren" was held on April 28, 1834.

Two other places named "Warren" had existed in Massachusetts prior to 1834. The first Warren, now in Rhode Island, was located on land combining parts of the Massachusetts Bay Colony and Plymouth Colony. In 1636, Roger Williams, banished from Salem, fled to the Indian village of Sowams, where he was sheltered by Massasoit until he settled at Providence.

Permanent English settlement east of the Indian village began. In 1653, Massasoit and his oldest son sold to certain Plymouth Colony settlers what is now Warren and parts of Barrington, Rhode Island, Swansea, Massachusetts, and Rehoboth, Massachusetts. In 1668, the township was officially incorporated with the name Sowams; in 1691, the Plymouth Colony merged with the Massachusetts Bay Colony. Warren was ceded to Rhode Island from Massachusetts in 1747. The town was named "Warren" after a British naval hero, Admiral Sir Peter Warren, following a victory at Louisburg in 1745. At the time of cession in 1747, Barrington was unified with Warren, until it was separated again in 1770.

The second "Warren, Massachusetts" is now the town of Warren, Maine. On November 7, 1776, Upper Town of St. Georges Plantation was incorporated as a town and named after Joseph Warren, the Revolutionary War hero. Maine separated from Massachusetts in 1820 as part of the Missouri Compromise.

Warren in Worcester County historically contained the villages of #4 Village, Center Village, West Warren, Lower Village, and South Warren. Historical markers mark each of these areas, and West Warren and Warren each have their own zip codes.

== Geography ==
According to the United States Census Bureau, the town has a total area of 27.6 square miles (71 km^{2}), of which 27.5 square miles (71 km^{2}) is land and 0.1 square miles (0.26 km^{2}), or 0.33%, is water.

Warren is bordered by Palmer on the west, Ware on the northwest, West Brookfield on the north and east, Brookfield on the southeast, and Brimfield on the south.

The Quaboag River runs through the center of town.

== Demographics ==
Historical population
Year	Pop.	±%
1790	899	—
1850	1,777	+97.7%
1860	2,107	+18.6%
1870	2,625	+24.6%
1880	3,889	+48.2%
1890	4,681	+20.4%
1900	4,417	−5.6%
1910	4,188	−5.2%
1920	3,467	−17.2%
1930	3,765	+8.6%
1940	3,531	−6.2%
1950	3,406	−3.5%
1960	3,383	−0.7%
1970	3,633	+7.4%
1980	3,777	+4.0%
1990	4,437	+17.5%
2000	4,776	+7.6%
2010	5,135	+7.5%
2020	4,975	−3.1%
2022*	4,968	−0.1%
* = population estimate. Source: United States census records and Population Estimates Program data.

At the 2000 census, there were 4,776 people, 1,889 households and 1,286 families residing in the town. The population density was 173.5 inhabitants per square mile (67.0/km^{2}). There were 2,014 housing units at an average density of 73.2 per square mile (28.3/km^{2}). The racial makeup of the town was 97.42% White, 0.42% Black or African American, 0.29% Native American, 0.27% Asian, 0.21% from other races, and 1.38% from two or more races. Hispanic or Latino of any race were 0.88% of the population.

There were 1,889 households, of which 33.2% had children under the age of 18 living with them, 51.0% were married couples living together, 12.1% had a female householder with no husband present, and 31.9% were non-families. 26.0% of all households were made up of individuals, and 10.1% had someone living alone who was 65 years of age or older. The average household size was 2.52 and the average family size was 3.02.

Age distribution was 26.8% under the age of 18, 7.0% from 18 to 24, 31.0% from 25 to 44, 22.0% from 45 to 64, and 13.2% who were 65 years of age or older. The median age was 37 years. For every 100 females, there were 96.2 males. For every 100 females age 18 and over, there were 94.4 males.

The median household income was $34,583, and the median family income was $39,598. Males had a median income of $32,773 versus $26,667 for females. The per capita income for the town was $17,192. About 5.0% of families and 6.1% of the population were below the poverty line, including 6.3% of those under age 18 and 6.9% of those aged 65 or over.

== Industry ==
Warren Pumps LLC, which began operations in 1897, continues a tradition of municipal (including flood control pumps for New Orleans, Louisiana), industrial, and commercial pump manufacturing in the town that dates back to the 1790s.

== Government ==
State government
State Representative(s):	Todd M. Smola (R, 1st Hampden)
State Senator(s):	Jacob Oliveira (D, Hampden, Hampshire, & Worcester)
Governor's Councilor(s):	Tara Jacobs (D, 8th District)
Federal government
U.S. Representative(s):	Richard E. Neal (D-1st District),
U.S. Senators:	Elizabeth Warren (D), Ed Markey (D)

== Notable people ==
- Molly Bish (born 1983), murder victim who disappeared in June 2000. Her body was recovered but no one was ever charged
- Dennis C. Haley, president of Suffolk University
- Eliza Trask Hill (1840–1908), activist, journalist, philanthropist
- Increase Sumner Lincoln, minister
- Nathan Read (1759-1849), inventor of the multi-tubular boiler, which later allowed for the extensive use of steam in transportation

== See also ==
- Warren Public Library (Warren, Massachusetts)
- Warren Town Hall
- Wrights (textile manufacturers)
