= East Brookfield (CDP), Massachusetts =

East Brookfield, Massachusetts
- CDP
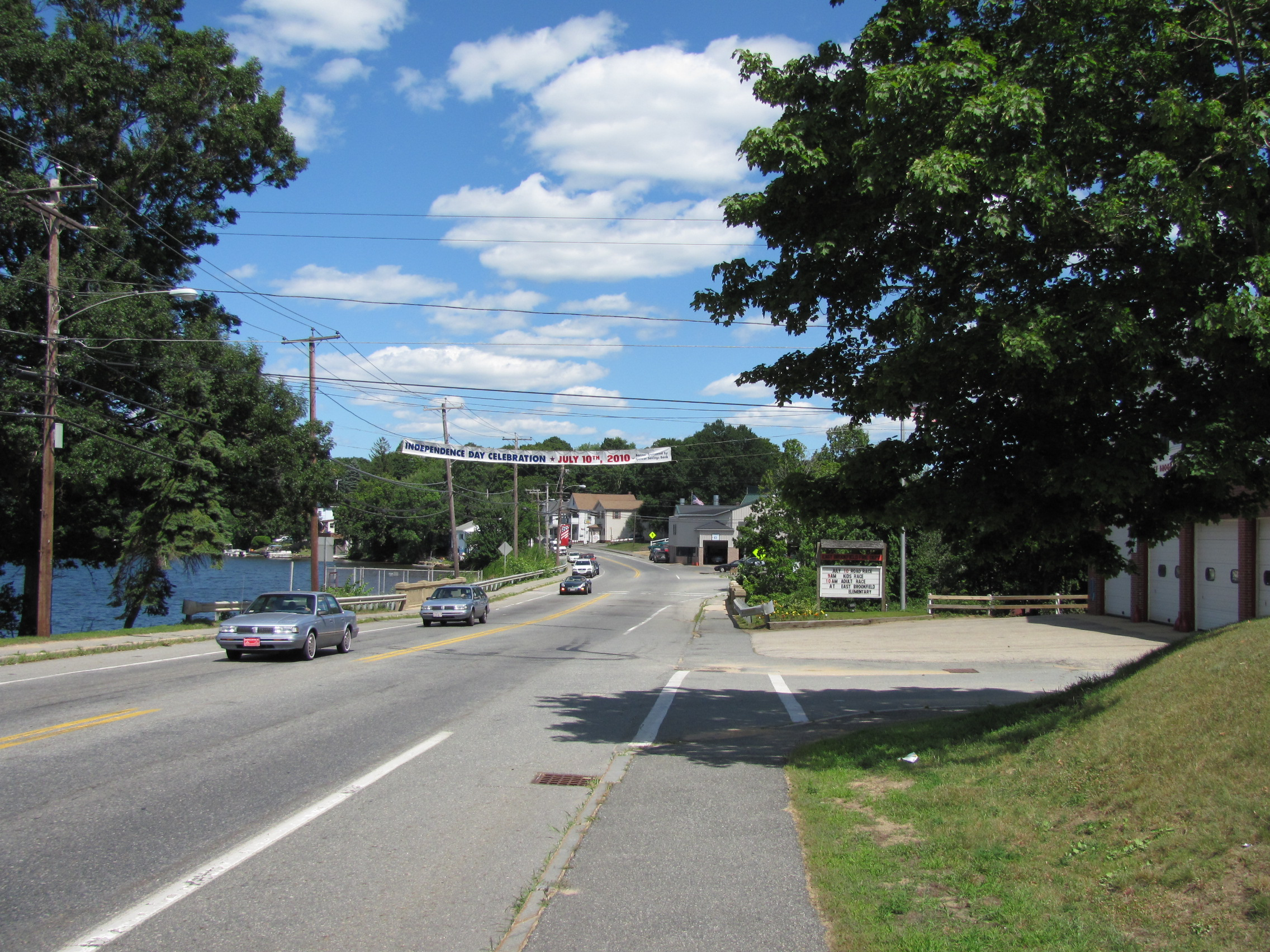
- East Main Street

- Location in Worcester County and the state of Massachusetts.
- Coordinates: 42°13′44″N 72°3′3″W
- Country: United States
- State: Massachusetts
- County: Worcester

Area
  - Total: 1.77 sq mi (4.59 km^{2})
  - Land: 1.62 sq mi (4.19 km^{2})
  - Water: 0.15 sq mi (0.40 km^{2})
- Elevation: 614 ft (187 m)

Population (2020)
  - Total: 1,292
  - Density: 798/sq mi (308.3/km^{2})
- Time zone: UTC-5 (Eastern (EST))
  - Summer (DST): UTC-4 (EDT)
- ZIP code: 01515
- Area code: 508
- FIPS code: 25-18595
- GNIS feature ID: 0609799

East Brookfield is a census-designated place (CDP) in the town of East Brookfield in Worcester County, Massachusetts, United States. The population was 1,323 at the 2010 census.

== Geography ==
East Brookfield is located at 42°13′44″N 72°3′2″W (42.228952, -72.050795).

According to the United States Census Bureau, the CDP has a total area of 4.6 km^{2} (1.8 sq mi), of which 4.2 km^{2} (1.6 sq mi) is land and 0.4 km^{2} (0.15 sq mi) (8.43%) is water.

== Demographics ==
Historical population
Census	Pop.	Note	%±
2020	1,292		—
U.S. Decennial Census

As of the census of 2000, there were 1,410 people, 527 households, and 394 families residing in the CDP. The population density was 332.0 people/km^{2} (860 people/mi^{2}). There were 563 housing units at an average density of 132.5 units/km^{2} (343 units/mi^{2}). The racial makeup of the CDP was 98.87% White, 0.21% Black or African American, 0.07% Native American, 0.14% Asian, 0.14% from other races, and 0.57% from two or more races. Hispanic or Latino of any race were 0.78% of the population.

There were 527 households, out of which 30.7% had children under the age of 18 living with them, 63.0% were married couples living together, 8.5% had a female householder with no husband present, and 25.2% were non-families. 20.9% of all households were made up of individuals, and 11.8% had someone living alone who was 65 years of age or older. The average household size was 2.68 and the average family size was 3.09.

In the CDP, the population was spread out, with 25.5% under the age of 18, 6.2% from 18 to 24, 30.1% from 25 to 44, 24.0% from 45 to 64, and 14.2% who were 65 years of age or older. The median age was 39 years. For every 100 females, there were 96.9 males. For every 100 females age 18 and over, there were 94.4 males.

The median income for a household in the CDP was $50,774, and the median income for a family was $60,000. Males had a median income of $42,305 versus $26,563 for females. The per capita income for the CDP was $22,161. About 3.9% of families and 4.5% of the population were below the poverty line, including 3.8% of those under age 18 and 12.2% of those age 65 or over.
