= Knowlton Hat Factory =

- U.S. National Register of Historic Places
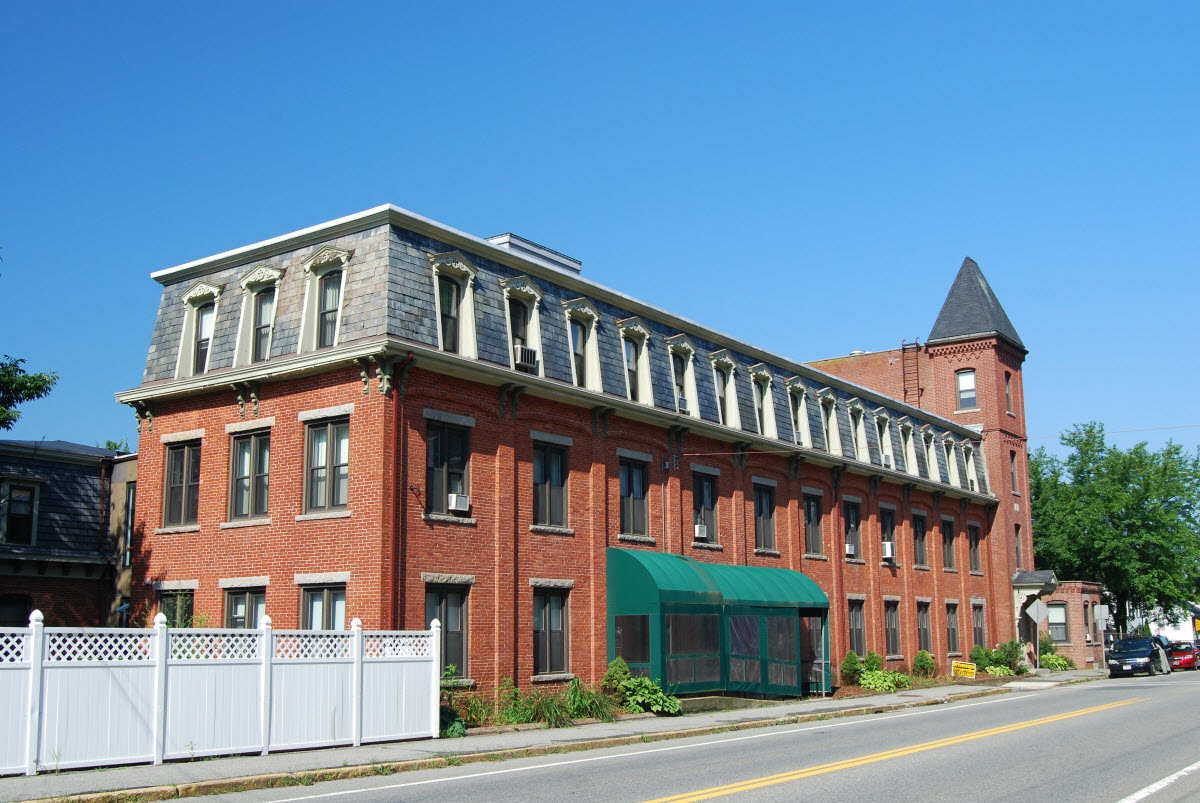

- Location within Massachusetts Location within the United States
- Location: 134 Main Street, Upton, Massachusetts
- Coordinates: 42°10′10″N 71°37′27″W
- Built: 1872
- Architectural style: Second Empire/Industrial
- NRHP reference No.: 82004467
- Added to NRHP: June 1, 1982

The Knowlton Hat Factory is a historic factory building in Upton, Massachusetts.

In 1835 William Knowlton and William Legg formed a business partnership that spawned the creation of the hat factory. In 1845 William Legg retired, and was replaced by Joseph F. Farnum who was in a partnership with Knowlton for a short time. When he retired the business was carried on by Knowlton until his sons became of age. This is when the business was named "William Knowlton and Sons."

The factory was expanded in 1872 with the addition of a tower and later an office. This date is in cement over the front door. By this time the factory had become the biggest women's hat factory in the world. Other buildings were added through the years, most notably a large addition of a wing in the rear of the shop in 1908.

In 1925 the shop was bought by the Merrimac Hat Company, makers of wool and fur hats, who continued operation until 1952 when the shop was sold to Charles Kartiganer. Shortly following Kartiganer's takeover he sold the business to Lish Industries, where in 1972 it again changed hands and was bought by Millhaus Trust.

The factory building was listed on the National Register of Historic Places in 1982. It was renovated by Healy and Brown Architectural Firm and converted into senior housing in 1985. The development is now owned by the Harbor Development Corp. in Swampscott, Massachusetts.

== Gallery ==
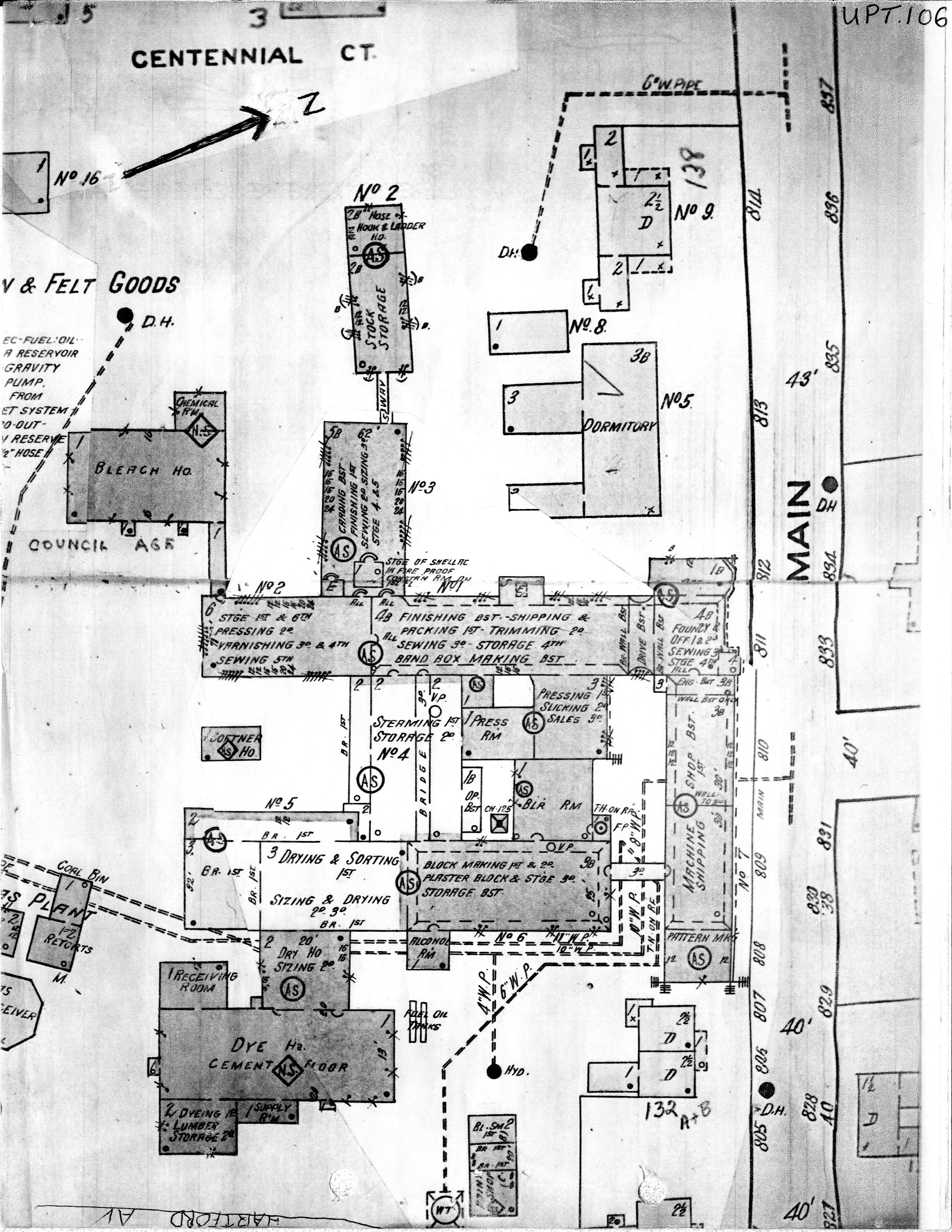

== See also ==
- National Register of Historic Places listings in Worcester County, Massachusetts
