= Upton, Massachusetts =

- Town
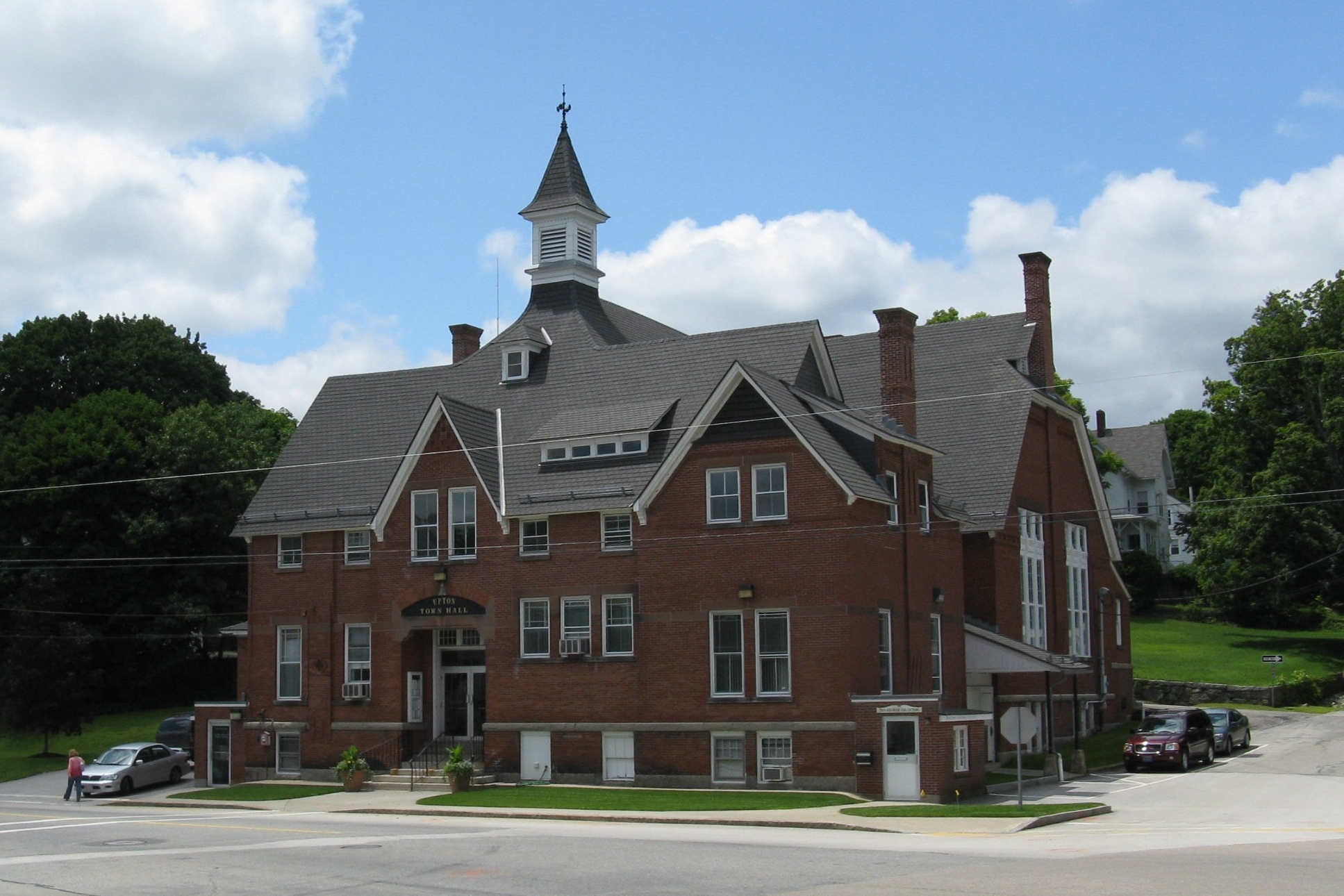
- Upton Town Hall

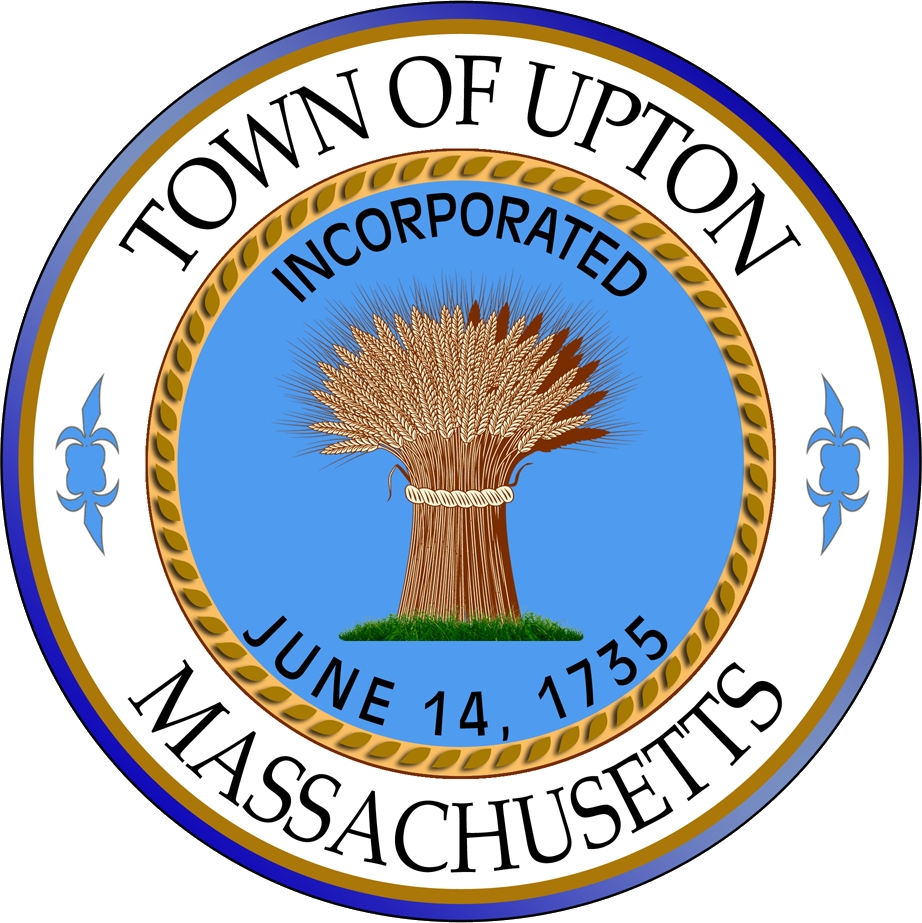
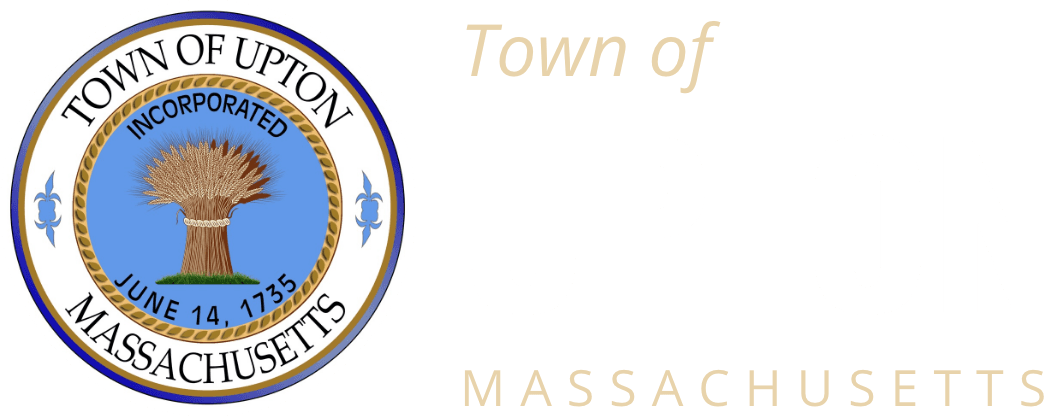
- Seal Wordmark

- Location in Worcester County and Massachusetts.
- Coordinates: 42°10′28″N 71°36′10″W
- Country: United States
- State: Massachusetts
- County: Worcester
- Settled: 1728

Government
  - Type: Open town meeting
  - Town Manager: Kristen Rubin
  - Board of Selectmen: Brett A. Simas; Maureen Dwinnell; Laura J. Hebb

Area
  - Total: 21.7 sq mi (56.3 km^{2})
  - Land: 21.5 sq mi (55.7 km^{2})
  - Water: 0.19 sq mi (0.5 km^{2})
- Elevation: 302 ft (92 m)

Population (2020)
  - Total: 8,000
  - Density: 368/sq mi (142.1/km^{2})
- Time zone: UTC-5 (Eastern)
  - Summer (DST): UTC-4 (Eastern)
- ZIP Codes: 01568 (Upton); 01757 (Milford)
- Area code: 508 / 774
- FIPS code: 25-71480
- GNIS feature ID: 0618386
- Website: www.uptonma.gov

Upton is a town in Worcester County, Massachusetts, United States. It was first settled in 1728. The population was given as exactly 8,000 at the 2020 census. It contains the census-designated place of the same name.

== History ==
Precolonial History

Archeological evidence indicates that present-day Upton began to be inhabited by indigenous peoples during the late Archaic Period. The area was originally settled by Algonquin peoples, but was mainly inhabited by Nipmuc peoples by the Woodland Period.

Four late Archaic settlements have been noted in the areas around Pratt Hill and Pratt Pond, two of which remained in use through the Woodland Period. Late Archaic peoples of New England lived nomadic or semi-nomadic lives, and it was unlikely the Archaic sites in present-day Upton were occupied year round; instead these were likely seasonally-occupied sites for activities such as hunting, fishing, or quarrying and tool making. Evidence of quarrying and tool making is present at one of the Pratt Hill sites.

The Woodland Period saw dramatic population increases in the region, spurred by ecological changes which resulted in increased abundance of food sources-- particularly nuts and game. During the Woodland Period Upton remained the site of seasonal encampments rather than permanent settlements. Limited agriculture began to be practiced seasonally in the area, though most food was obtained through hunting and gathering. These encampments were used by the residents of larger villages located in present-day Grafton and Uxbridge. The indigenous population of this area is thought to have peaked shortly before European contact.

Important trails are known to have passed through present-day Upton during the precolonial era, notably, the Old Connecticut Path bisected the area. More localized trails connected the Upton area to villages in present-day Grafton, Uxbridge, and Westborough.

Colonial and Postcolonial History

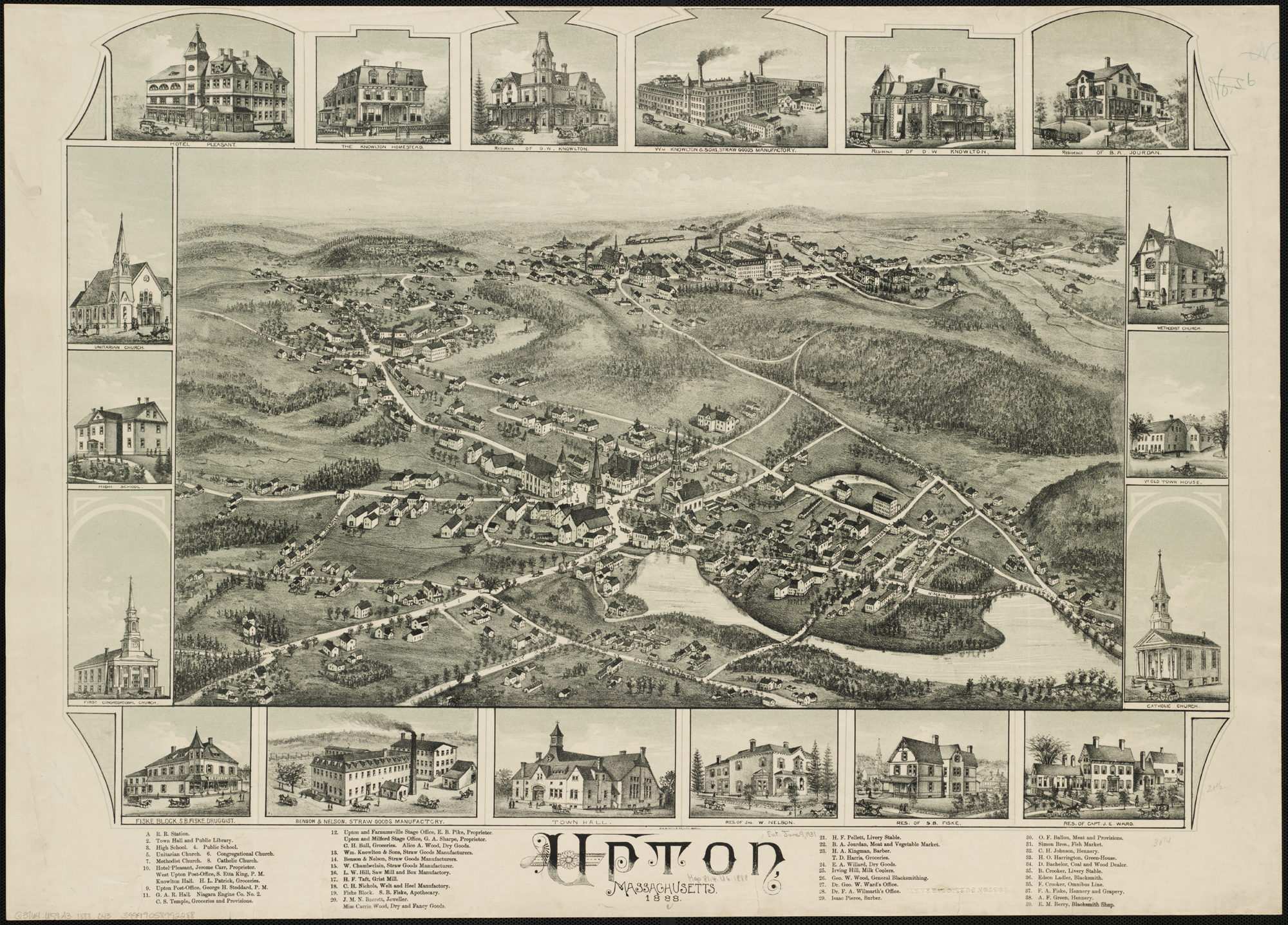
Plan of Upton in 1888

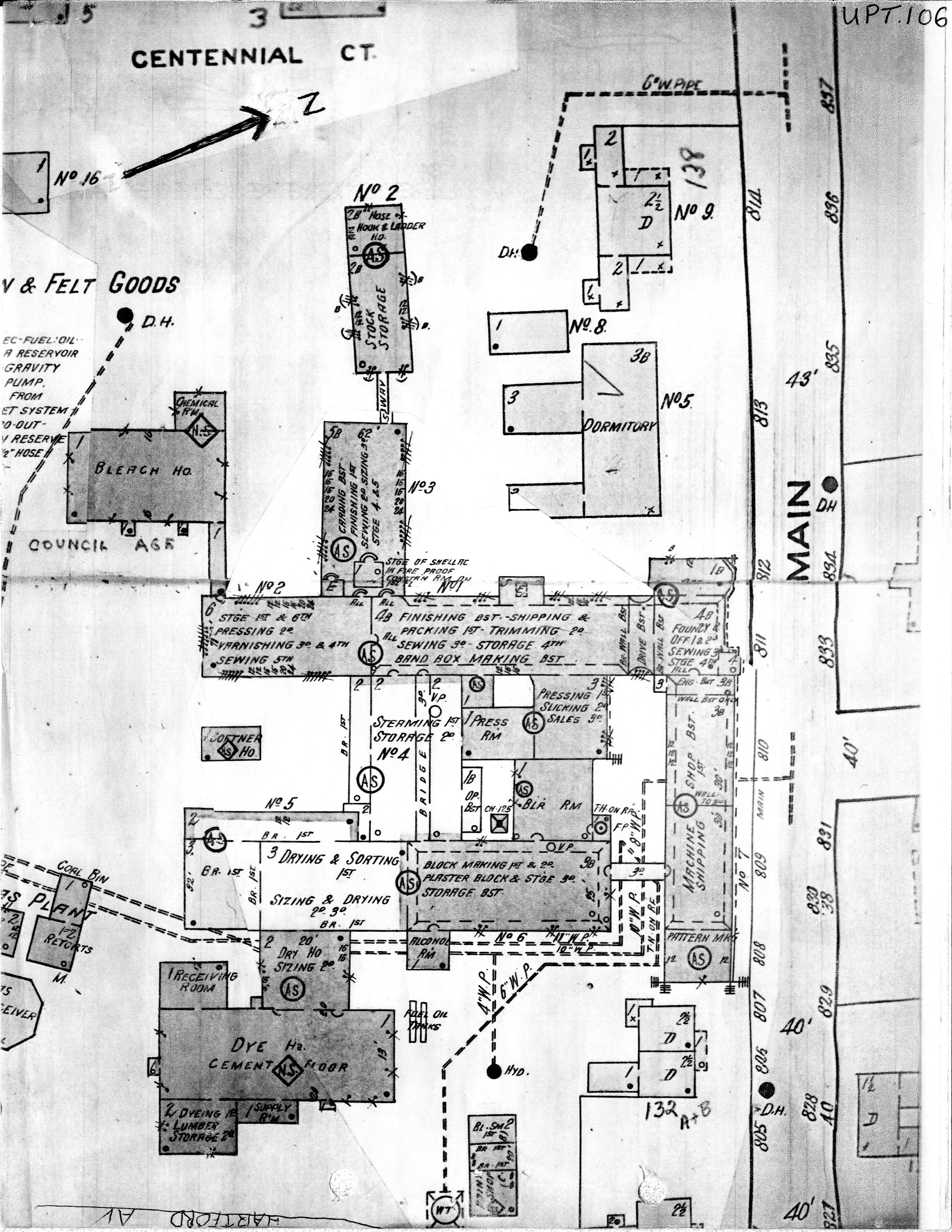
Knowlton hat factory plan

The town was first settled by Europeans in 1728. Residents in outlying areas of surrounding towns were finding it difficult to fulfil the obligation to attend church every Sunday, so they petitioned the state for creation of a new town central to their homes, and in 1735 Upton was incorporated, taking land from Hopkinton, Mendon, Uxbridge, and Sutton.

Upton was home to a number of members of the Taft family, including an American Revolutionary War soldier named Samuel Taft, who was born there. Samuel Taft had 22 children and hosted President George Washington on his inaugural tour of New England in 1789. Three-term mayor of Worcester, historian Judge Henry Chapin was born here on May 13, 1811.

Between 1730 and 1850, Upton had many small shoe shops, called ten–footers. These operations were gradually merged into large assembly-line manufacturing companies. By 1837, Upton produced 21.7% of the boots made in Worcester County.

William Knowlton founded what was to become the world's largest women's hat factory: Knowlton Hat Factory was built in 1872 and added to the National Historic Register in 1982.

The Upton Fire Department was incorporated at Town Meeting on April 9, 1839, and has served Upton and its residents for 175 years.

== Naming ==
There seems to be no contemporaneous record of the reason the town's name was chosen. One history, published in 1984, speculates that "among several Uptons in England one is situated thirteen miles south of Worcester...Upton...like its English counterpart, lies thirteen miles south [actually south-east] of Worcester". The town in question is Upton upon Severn.

== Geography ==
According to the United States Census Bureau, the town has a total area of 21.7 square miles (56 km^{2}), of which 21.5 square miles (56 km^{2}) are land and 0.2 square miles (0.52 km^{2}) (0.97%) is water.

The northwestern section of Upton, including the area surrounding Warren Brook, has become known as Forest Green by locals due to the lush rolling hills that can be seen from Fowler Street and Mechanic Street.

== Demographics ==
Historical population

Year	Pop.	±%
1790	833	—
1850	2,023	+142.9%
1860	1,986	−1.8%
1870	1,989	+0.2%
1880	2,023	+1.7%
1890	1,878	−7.2%
1900	1,937	+3.1%
1910	2,071	+6.9%
1920	1,693	−18.3%
1930	2,026	+19.7%

Year	Pop.	±%
1940	2,249	+11.0%
1950	2,656	+18.1%
1960	3,127	+17.7%
1970	3,484	+11.4%
1980	3,886	+11.5%
1990	4,677	+20.4%
2000	5,642	+20.6%
2010	7,542	+33.7%
2020	8,000	+6.1%
2024	8,475	+5.9%

Source: United States census records and Population Estimates Program data.

At the 2020 census, the population had reached 8,000. The racial makeup of the town was 87.5% White, 0.8% Black, 0% (1 individual) American Indian/Alaska Native, 4.2% Asian, 0.1% Native Hawaiian/Pacific Islander, 1.4% from other races, and 6.0% from two or more races. Hispanic or Latino of any race were 3.5% of the population.

There were 2,910 households in the town. The population density was 370.4 inhabitants per square mile (143.0/km^{2}), and there were 2,995 housing units at an average density of 138.7 per square mile (53.6/km^{2}). Of the households, 35.5% had children under the age of 18, 64.7% were married couples living together, 16.4% had a female householder with no spouse or partner present, and 13.1% had a sole male householder. 19.4% of all households were made up of individuals, and 9.7% had someone living alone who was 65 years of age or older.

The age ranges included 5.4% under the age of 5, 22.4% under the age of 18, 4.3% from 18 to 21, and 15.3% who were 65 years of age or older. The median age was 43.5 years. 49.6% identified as male and 50.4% as female.

According to the Census Bureau's American Community Survey, the median income for a household in the town between 2017 and 2021 was $140,192 (2021 dollars), and the per capita income for the town was $57,613. About 2.0% of the population were below the poverty line.

== Community Center ==
Founded in March 1871, the Upton Town Library was housed in a converted church downtown until 2023. After a 20-year effort, built using a $12 million bond approved at the 2021 Town Meeting and subsequent election, the new Upton Community Center was opened on May 1, 2023. It combines a new library building, a new senior center, a refurbished children's playground, and a number of meeting rooms and study areas.

== Education ==
=== Public schools ===
Memorial Elementary School and Nipmuc Regional High School are part of the public school system of the Mendon-Upton Regional School District.

Blackstone Valley Regional Vocational Technical High School is a trade school also open to the nearby towns of Northbridge, Grafton, Millbury, Bellingham, Uxbridge, Millville, Sutton, Milford, Hopedale, Blackstone, Douglas and Mendon.

== Government ==
Government is by open Town Meeting. There are three selectmen elected to three-year terms, and an appointed town manager.

State government
State Representative(s):	David K. Muradian, Jr (R)
State Senator(s):	Ryan C. Fattman (R)
Governor's Councilor(s):	Paul M. DePalo (D)
Federal government
U.S. Representative(s):	Jim McGovern (D) (2nd District)
U.S. Senators:	Elizabeth Warren (D), Ed Markey (D)

== Notable people ==
- Arthur Newton, athlete
- Samuel Taft, an American Revolutionary War soldier, was born in Upton; hosted President George Washington on his inaugural tour of New England in 1789.

== Images ==
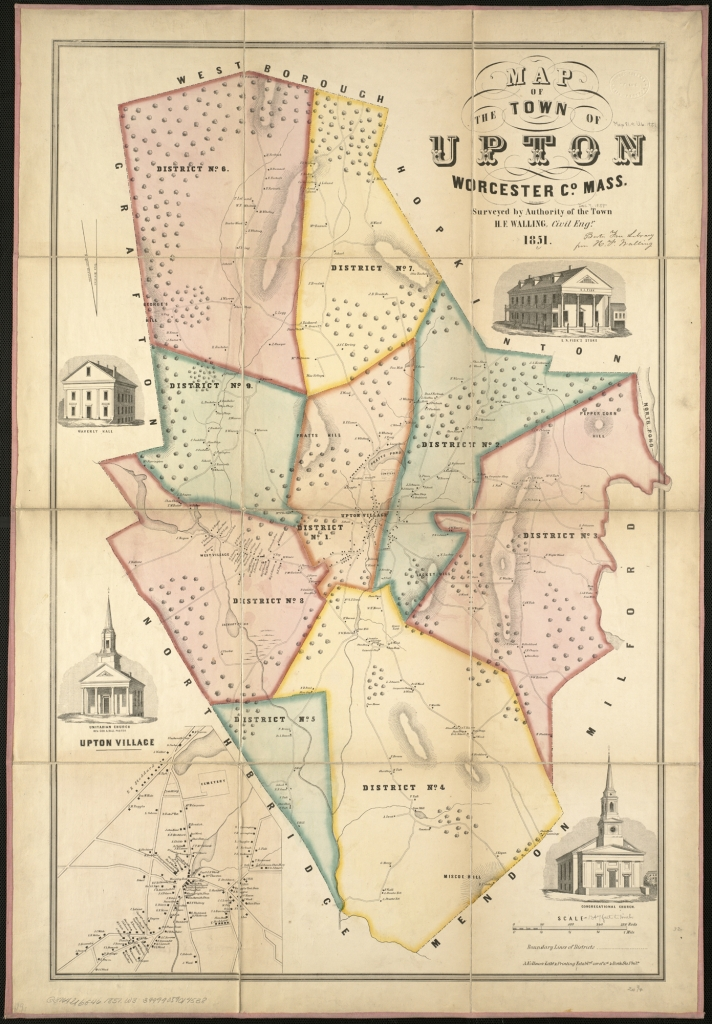
1851 survey map showing districts

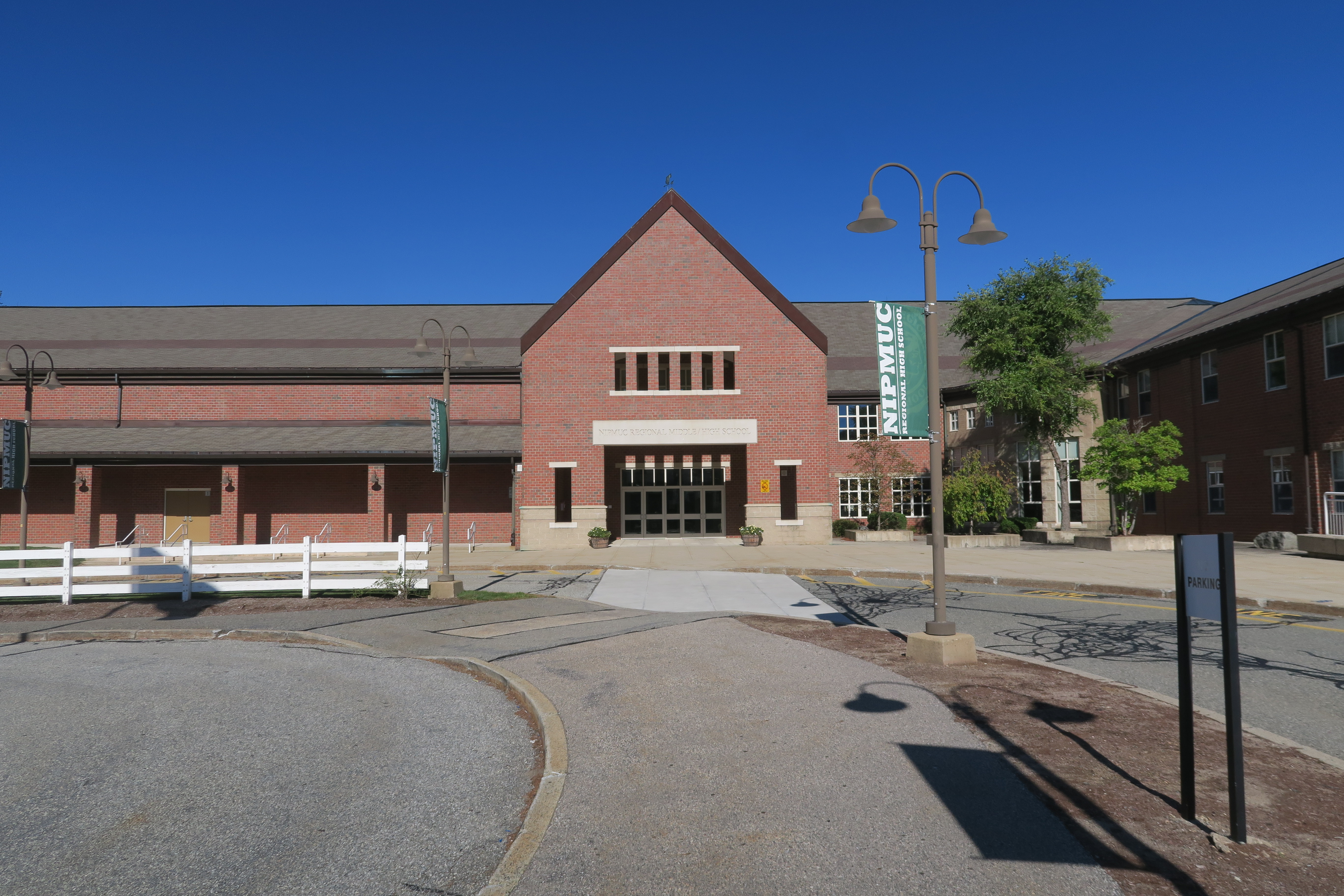
Nipmuc Regional High School

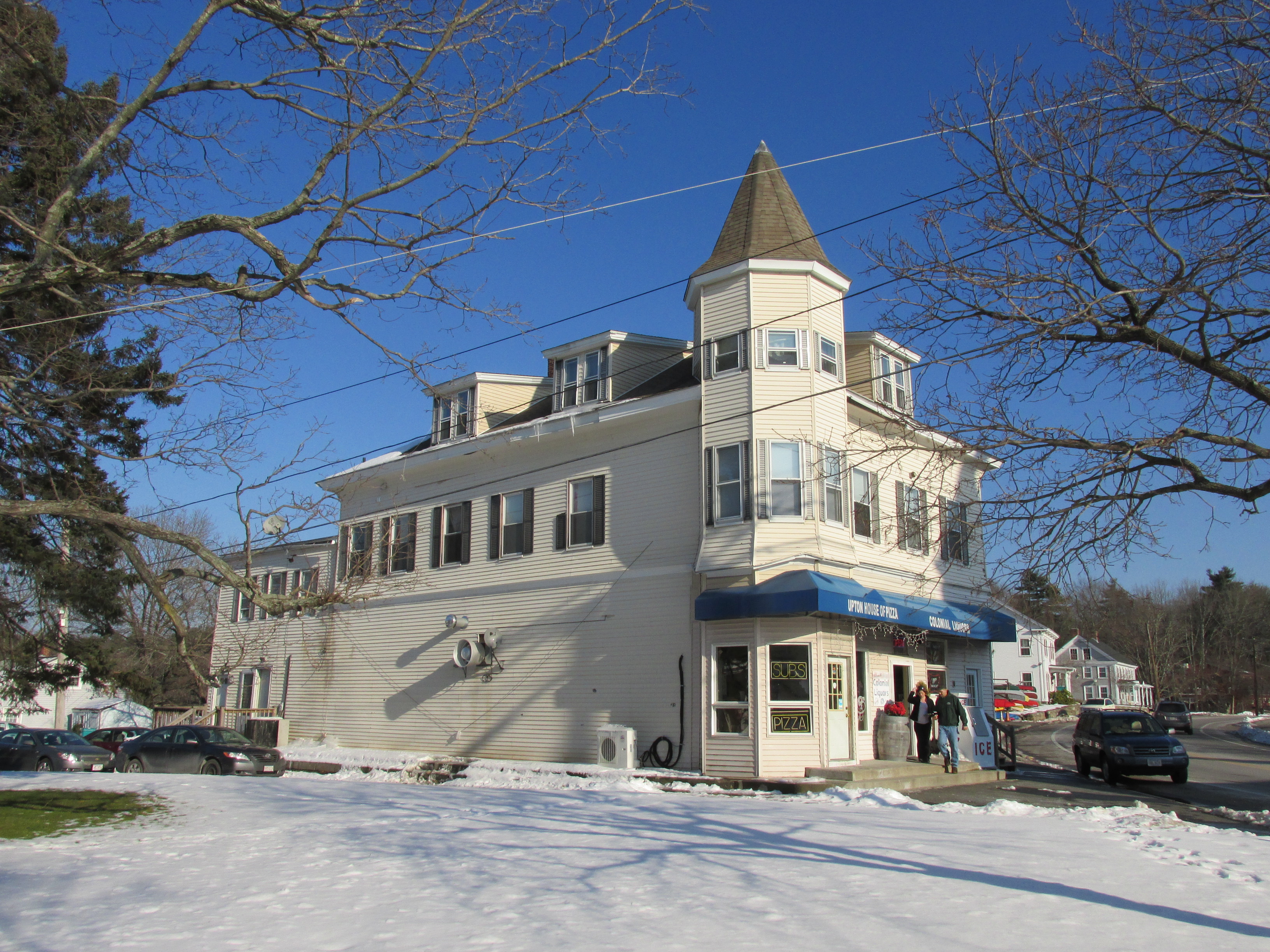
Upton House of Pizza, in the town center
