= Indian Lake =

Indian Lake may refer to:

== Lakes ==
- Indian Lake (Aberdeen Township, Algoma District), Ontario
- Indian Lake (Gour Township, Kenora District), Ontario
- Indian Lake (Smellie Township, Kenora District), Ontario
- Indian Lake (Frontenac County), Ontario
- Indian Lake (Auld Township, Timiskaming District), Ontario
- Indian Lake (Earl Township, Sudbury District), Ontario
- Indian Lake (Tyrrell Township, Timiskaming District), Ontario
- Indian Lake (McBride Township, Sudbury District), Ontario
- Indian Lake (Hallett Township, Algoma District), Ontario
- Indian Lake (Leeds and Grenville United Counties), Ontario
- Indian Lake (Thunder Bay District), Ontario
- Indian Lake (English River, Kenora District), Ontario
- Indian Lake (Nipissing District), Ontario
- Indian Lake (Jacobson Township, Algoma District), Ontario
- Indian Lake (Hastings County), Ontario
- Indian Lake (Connecticut – New York), adjacent to New York State Route 361
- Indian Lake (Indiana)
- Indian Lake (Massachusetts)
- Indian Lake (Michigan), a set index article, including:
  - Indian Lake (Cass County, Michigan)
  - Indian Lake (Schoolcraft County, Michigan)
- Indian Lake (Blue Earth County, Minnesota)
- Indian Lake (Nobles County, Minnesota)
- Indian Lake, in Sibley County, Minnesota
- Indian Lake (New Jersey)
- Indian Lake (Hamilton County, New York), adjacent to the towns of Indian Lake and Lake Pleasant
- Indian Lake, in Morehouse, Hamilton County, New York
- Indian Lake (Ohio)
- Indian Lake (Washington County, Rhode Island)
- Indian Lake (Wisconsin)
- Indian Lake (Teton County, Wyoming)

== Settlements ==
- Indian Lake Township, Nobles County, Minnesota
- Indian Lake, Missouri
- Indian Lake, New York
  - Indian Lake (hamlet), New York
- Indian Lake, Pennsylvania
- Indian Lake, in South Kingstown, Rhode Island
- Indian Lake, Texas

== Songs ==
- "Indian Lake" (song), a 1968 song by the Cowsills

== See also ==
- Big Injun Lake
