= Massachusetts Route 70 =

State highway in Massachusetts, United States

Route 70
- Route 70 highlighted in red

Route information
- Maintained by MassDOT
- Length: 20.78 mi (33.44 km)

Major junctions
- South end: Route 9 in Worcester
- I-290 in Worcester; Route 140 in Boylston; Route 62 / Route 110 in Clinton; Route 117 in Lancaster
- North end: Route 2 in Lancaster

Location
- Country: United States
- State: Massachusetts
- Counties: Worcester

Highway system
- Massachusetts State Highway System; Interstate; US; State
← Route 69	→ Route 71

Route 70 is a 20.78-mile-long (33.44 km) north–south state highway in Worcester County, Massachusetts. Its southern terminus is at Route 9 in Worcester and its northern terminus is at Route 2 in Lancaster. Along the way it intersects Interstate 290 (I-290) in Worcester.

Work has been ongoing since 2011 to upgrade the road as of 2024.

== Route description ==
Route 70 begins as the northward continuation of Major Taylor Boulevard at Route 9 as Lincoln Street. It crosses under Interstate 290 at exit 18, a partial exit, and continues northward, bearing northeastward and crossing under Interstate 290 again at eExit 20, another partial exit. It passes several shopping plazas before turning more northward onto Boylston Street. Route 70 passes through the far northwestern corner of Shrewsbury before entering the town of Boylston.

In Boylston, Route 70 crosses Route 140 and proceeds in an arc near the Wachusett Reservoir. As it enters the town of Clinton, Route 70 begins a concurrency with Route 62 which lasts for approximately 2.6 miles (4.2 km), with the last 0.3 miles (0.48 km) being a triple concurrency with Route 110 through the center of town. Once the route leaves the concurrency, it heads northward into the town of Lancaster.

Once in Lancaster, the route passes the former Atlantic Union College and crosses the north branch of the Nashua River before meeting Route 117, joining the route for a quarter mile. It then turns north again, following the western border of Devens Reserve Forces Training Area (a division of Fort Devens). Route 70 ends just north of Route 2 at Fort Pond Road, where the ramps from Route 2 west's exit 103.

== Major intersections ==
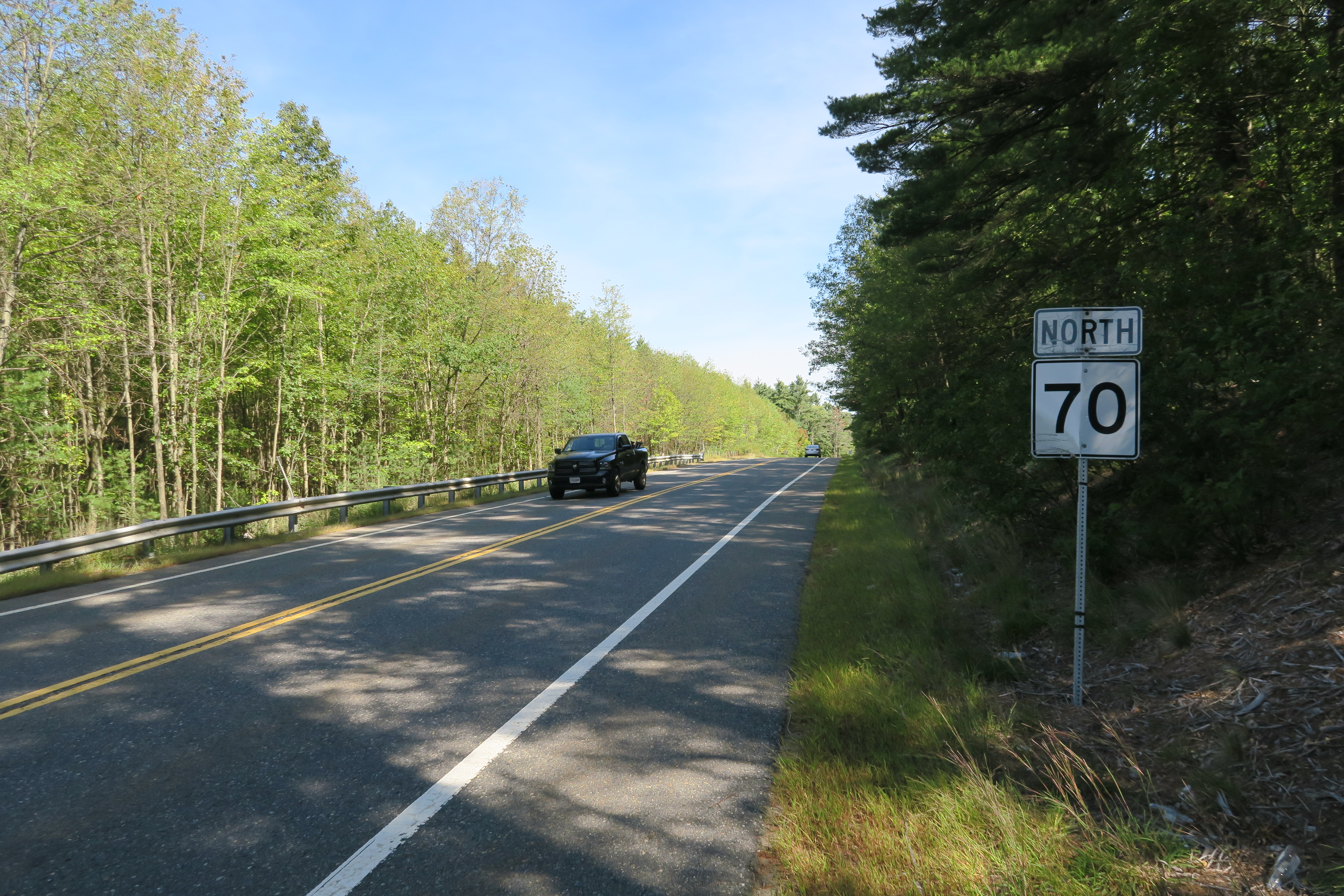
Northbound in Boylston, Massachusetts

The entire route is in Worcester County.

Location	mi	km	Destinations	Notes
Worcester	0.0	0.0	Route 9 to I-290 west / Worcester Center Boulevard – Leicester, Ware, Brookfield, Westboro, Framingham	Southern terminus
Worcester	0.3	0.48	I-290 east to I-190 north – Shrewsbury, Marlboro	Exit 21 on I-290; entrance from I-290 west only
Worcester	1.5	2.4	I-290 to I-395 south – Shrewsbury, Marlboro, Auburn, Norwich, CT	Exit 23 on I-290
Boylston	5.6	9.0	Route 140 to I-290 – Shrewsbury, Westminster	
Clinton	10.8	17.4	Route 62 east – Berlin, Hudson	Southern terminus of Route 62 concurrency
Clinton	13.0	20.9	Route 110 west – West Boylston	Southern terminus of Route 110 concurrency
Clinton	13.3	21.4	Route 110 east – Harvard, Ayer	Northern terminus of Route 110 concurrency
Clinton	13.4	21.6	Route 62 west – Sterling, Barre	Northern terminus of Route 62 concurrency
Lancaster	16.9	27.2	Route 117 east – Bolton, Maynard	Southern terminus of Route 117 concurrency
Lancaster	17.1	27.5	Route 117 west – Leominster, Westminster	Northern terminus of Route 117 concurrency
Lancaster	20.7	33.3	Route 2 east – Concord, Boston	Rotary with Old Union Turnpike; exit 103 on Route 2
Lancaster	20.78	33.44	Route 2 west – Athol, Greenfield	access via Fort Pond Road; exit 103 on Route 2
Lancaster			To Route 2A / Route 225 – Lunenburg, Shirley	Northern terminus; access via Route 2A and Route 225
1.000 mi = 1.609 km; 1.000 km = 0.621 mi: Concurrency terminus; Incomplete access
