= Greendale Mall =

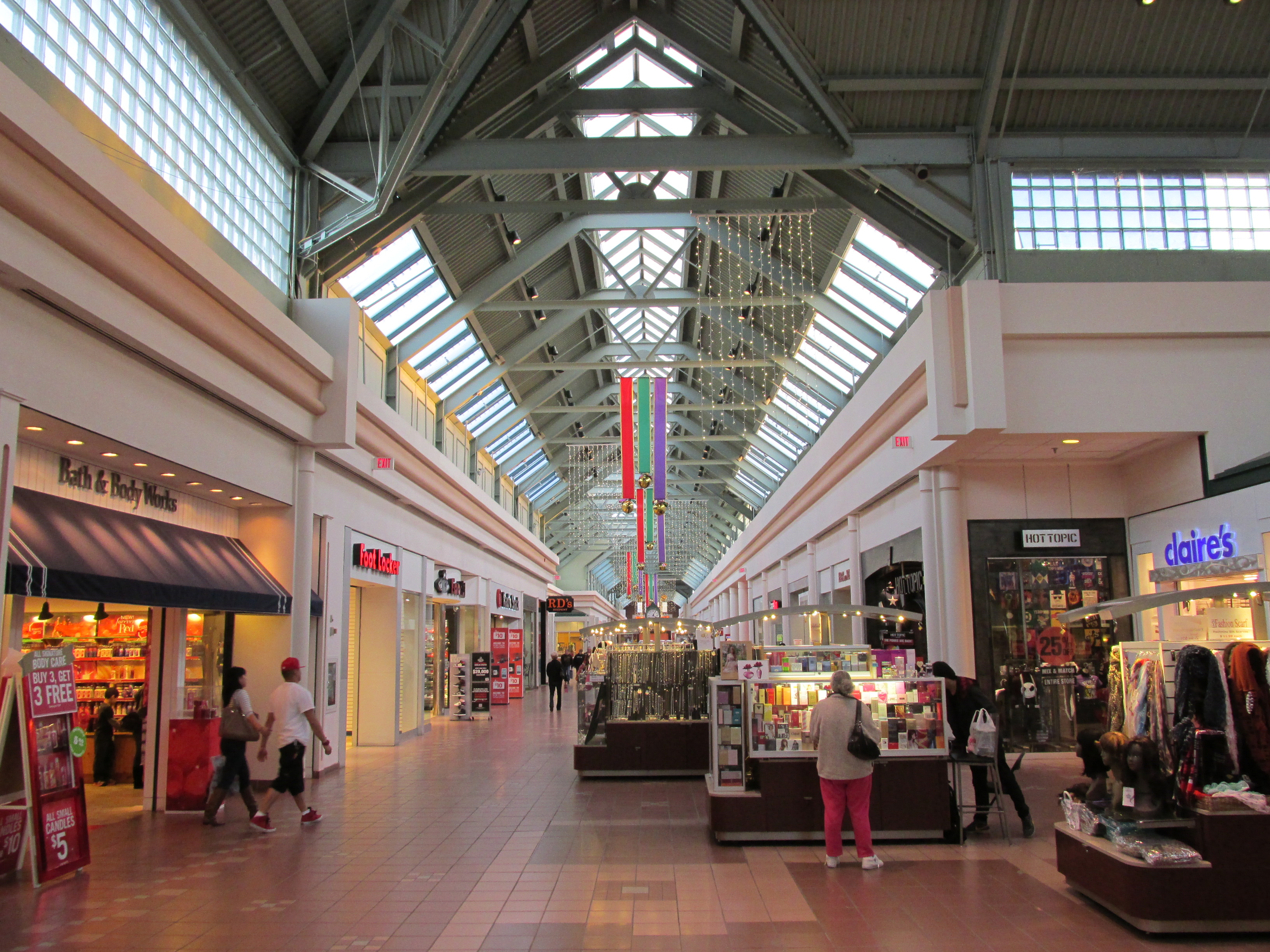
- Greendale Mall interior, 2012
- Location: Worcester, Massachusetts, United States
- Coordinates: 42.2967°N 71.8007°W
- Address: 7 Neponset Street
- Opened: 1987
- Closed: 2020
- Owner: Finard Properties
- Num. of stores: 37
- Num. of anchor tenants: 4 (all vacant)
- Floor area: 432,000 square feet (40,100 m^{2})
- Floors: 1 with partial lower level
- Website: none

The Greendale Mall was an enclosed shopping mall located near the intersection of Interstates 290 and 190 in Worcester, Massachusetts, United States. The anchors were Best Buy, Big Lots (originally Marshalls), DSW, and a combination of TJ Maxx and HomeGoods.

== History ==
The mall first opened in 1987, anchored by Lechmere and Marshalls stores. TJ Maxx 'N More was later added in the late 1990s and it later became a TJ Maxx and HomeGoods combo store. Lechmere closed in 1997 and later became Best Buy. Marshalls closed in 2007 and became Big Lots in 2010.

Simon Property Group purchased the mall in 1999. The company stopped paying the debt on the mall in October 2015 and the noteholder took ownership of the Mall. At the time of the takeover by the note holder, the mall was performing very poorly. In November 2015, the mall was appraised at $14.7 million but had a loan value of $45 million.

In June 2016, the mall was sold at auction to Chicago law firm Seyfarth Shaw LLP for $11.8 million, the mortgage holder of the property, after no other bids were received. In September 2016, Burlington-based KeyPoint Partners, the company representing the new owners and managing the building, announced that Worcester's only enclosed shopping mall would remain open.

On December 19, 2018, it was announced that Big Lots would be closing in January 2019.

On September 9, 2019, it was announced that Best Buy would also be closing in November 2019.

On December 16, 2019, a Boston developer bought the rundown Greendale Mall in Worcester and the new owner's plans were to demolish the 33-year-old shopping center and replace it with a mix of retail, apartments, and office space. Plans were later changed and the mall would be demolished and replaced with an Amazon delivery station (DTB4). The mall closed permanently in 2020.

On October 23, 2020, it was announced that TJ Maxx/HomeGoods would be relocating to Lincoln Plaza on April 24, 2021, leaving the mall entirely vacant and officially closed for good. It was demolished in Summer 2021.
