= Partial cloverleaf interchange =

Modification of a cloverleaf interchange

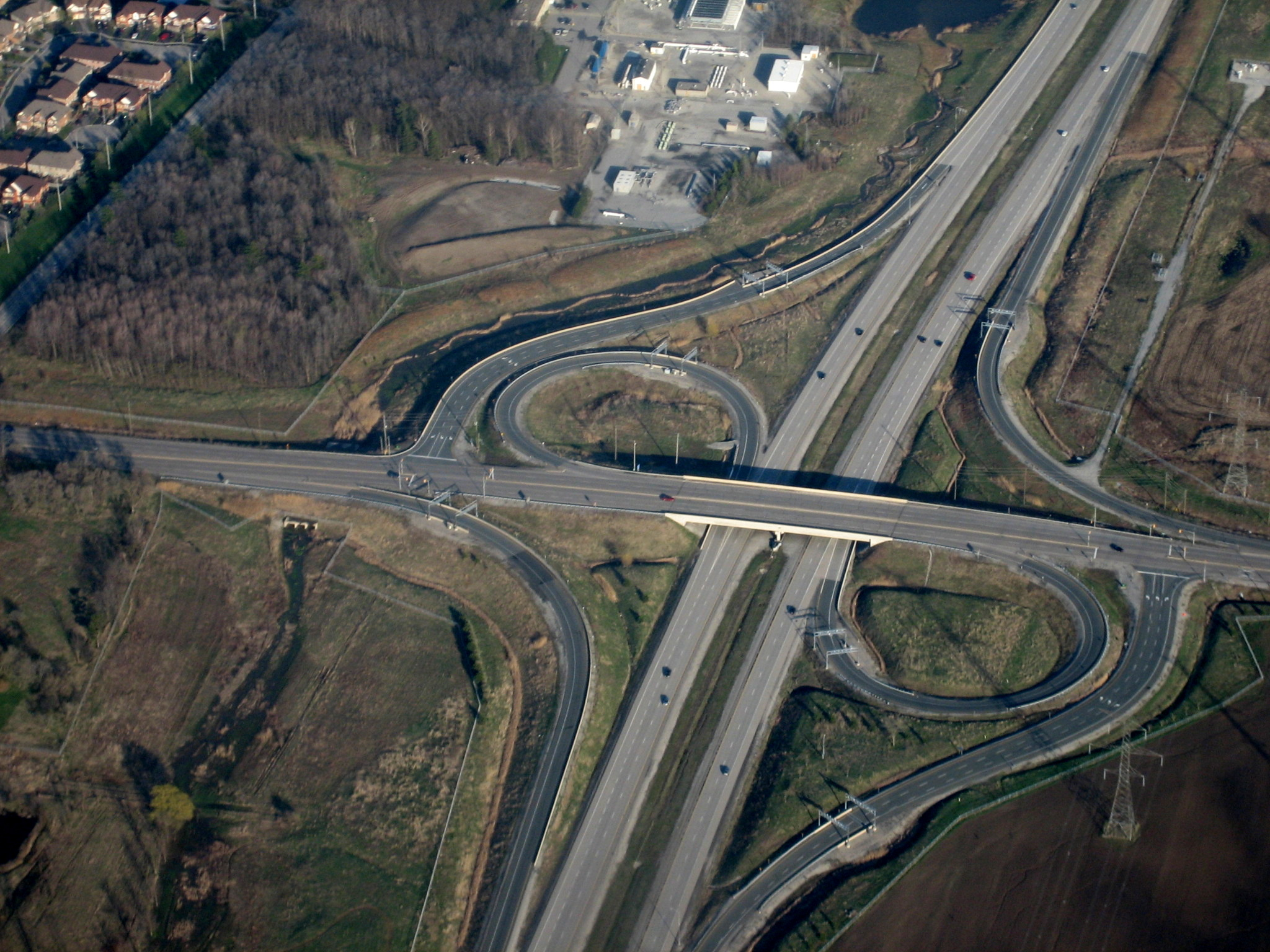
A parclo A4 type interchange on the Highway 407 Electronic Toll Route of Derry Road in Mississauga/Milton, Ontario, Canada 43.571623°N 79.789925°W

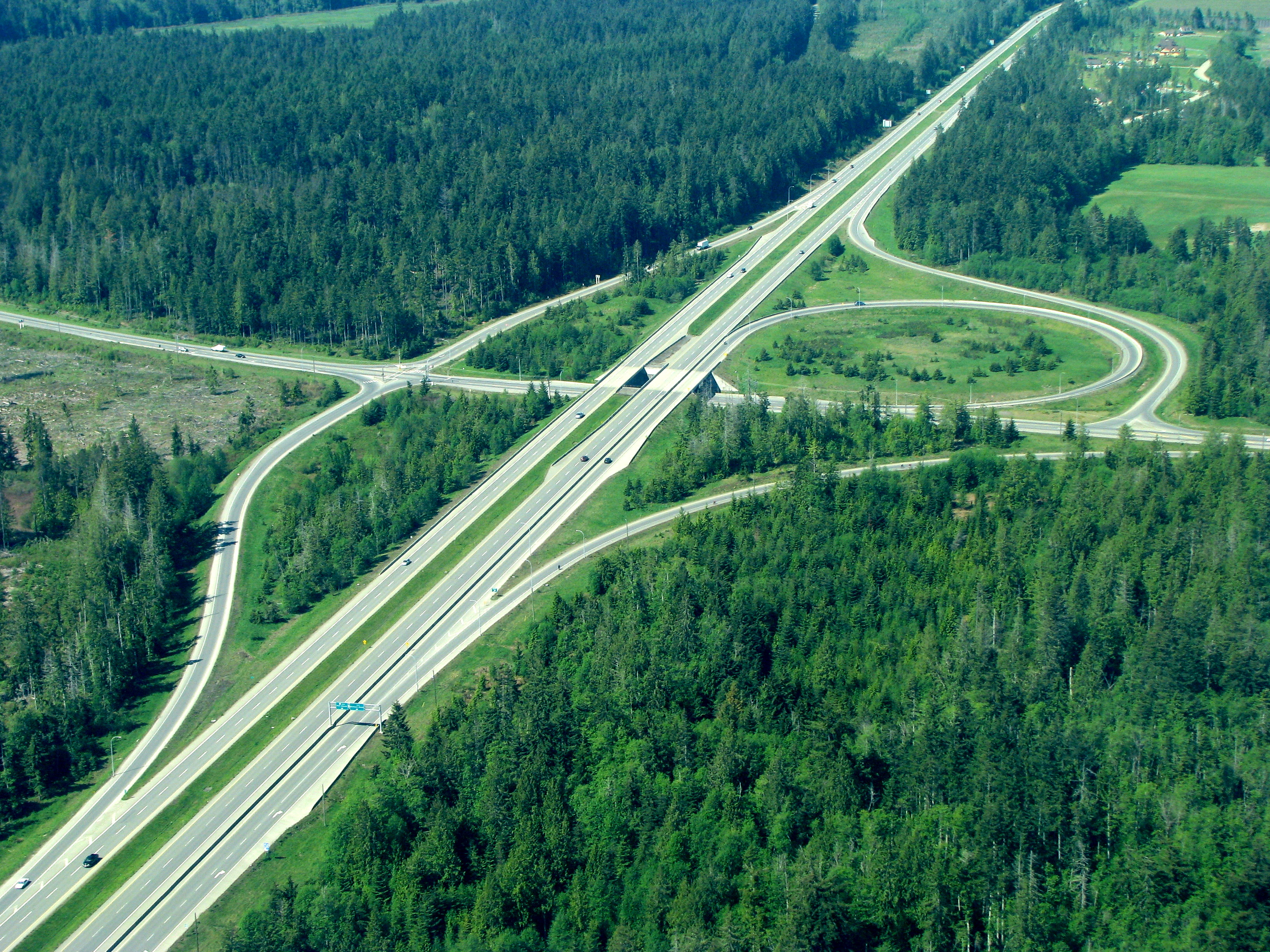
A five-ramp parclo of Alberni Pacific Rim BC Highway 4 and Inland Island Highway 19 at Qualicum Beach in British Columbia, Vancouver Island 49.324786°N 124.441373°W

A partial cloverleaf interchange or parclo is a modification of a cloverleaf interchange.

The design, originally invented by the Ontario Ministry of Transportation, has since become one of the most popular freeway-to-arterial interchange designs in North America because it maximizes traffic flow while eliminating weaving. It has also been used occasionally in some European countries, such as Germany, Hungary, Italy, the Netherlands, and the United Kingdom.

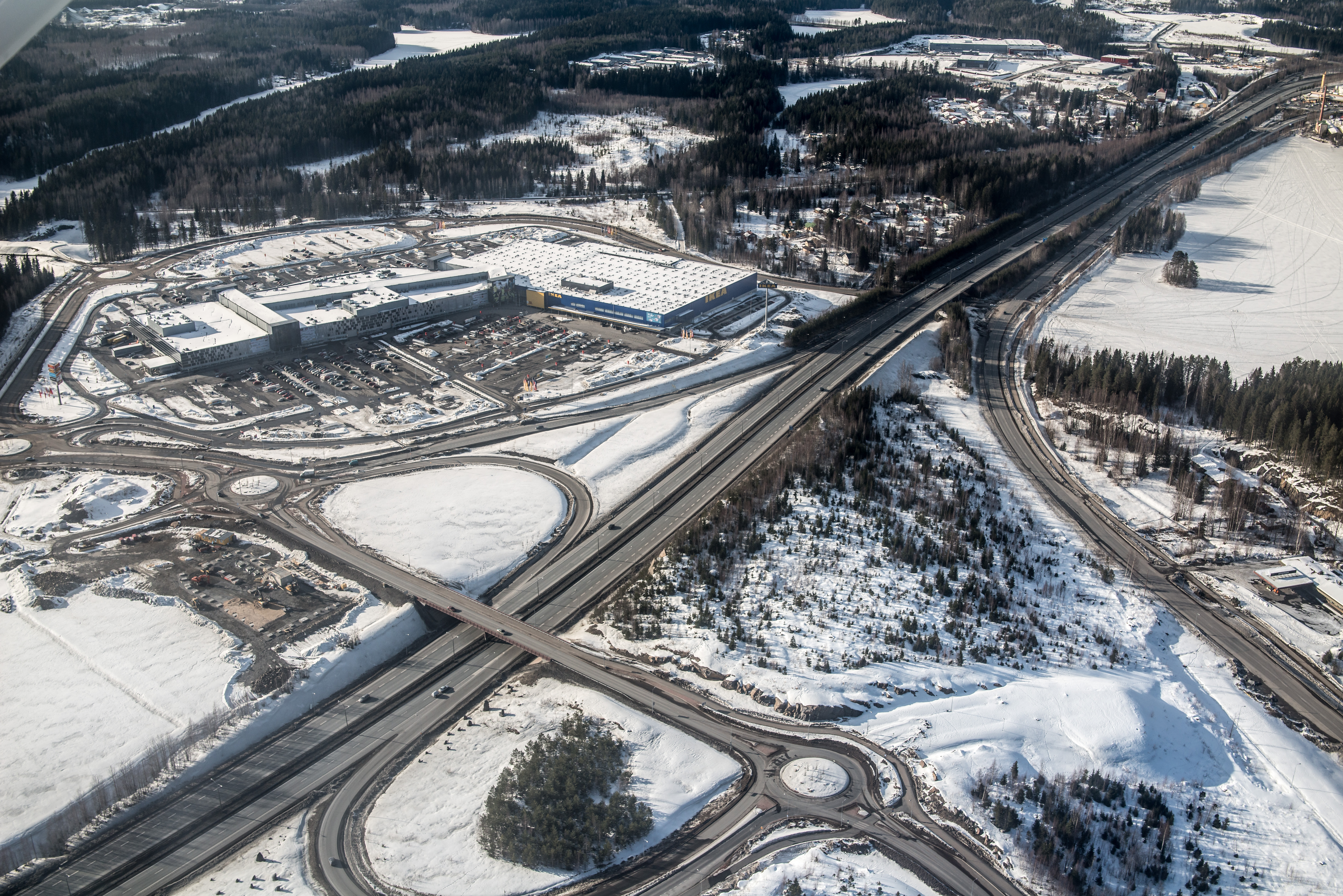
An aerial view of a parclo A2 featuring roundabouts connecting Highway 5 and Matkus Shopping Center in Kuopio, Finland. 62°49′16″N 27°36′40″E

== Comparison with other interchanges ==
- A diamond interchange has four ramps.
- A cloverleaf interchange has eight ramps, as does a stack interchange. They are fully grade separated, unlike a parclo, and have traffic flow without stops on all ramps and throughways.
- A parclo generally has either four or six ramps but less commonly has five or seven ramps.

== Naming ==
In Ontario, the specific variation is identified by a letter/number suffix after the name. Ontario's naming conventions are used in this article. The letter A designates that two ramps meet the freeway ahead of the arterial road, while B designates that two ramps meet the freeway beyond the crossing.

The number designates how many quadrants of the interchange contain ramps. In left-hand drive countries, the ramps function the same as in right-hand drive countries, but ramps with the same designation appear visually reversed. Common parclo configurations include the parclo A2, parclo B2 and parclo A4.

The Department of Transportation in the United States refers to the A and B variants without numbers.

Caltrans refers to the A2, B2, and A4 as types L-7, L-8, and L-9 respectively.

== Configurations ==
=== A2 and B2 ===
B2 configuration for right-hand traffic, or A2 for left-hand traffic.

Parclo A2 and B2 configurations contain four ramps. On each side of the freeway there is a loop ramp and a directional ramp. In parclo A2, the loop ramps serve as on-ramps and the directional ramps serve as off-ramps. In parclo B2 the roles are reversed. Both on- and off-ramps require controlled intersections at the arterial road (sometimes loop and directional ramps from the same side of the freeway will utilize the same intersection).

The parclo A2 and B2 are commonly used on rural freeways such as Highway 402 and Highway 416, where the ramps can be added without widening the street overpass/underpass to include deceleration lanes (normally needed on the A4 in order to safely enter the loop ramps that lead to the freeway). The parclo A2 and B2 ramps are also usually longer and allow for higher speeds than their A4 counterparts because of rural land availability. It is possible to upgrade an A2 to an A4 by adding directional ramps, serving arterial-to-freeway traffic that would otherwise be forced to make a left turn to enter the loop ramps.

=== A4 ===
A4 interchange for right-hand traffic, or B4 interchange for left-hand traffic

The parclo A4 (also called "six-ramp partial cloverleaf") contains six ramps. On each side on the freeway, there is an (often multi-lane) exit ramp, followed by a loop ramp and directional ramp entering the freeway. The on-ramps are in the same configuration as a cloverleaf interchange, but there is one off-ramp for each freeway direction instead of two, typically requiring a controlled intersection where the off-ramp meets the arterial road.

The parclo A4 is one of the most popular designs, as all movements from the arterial road to the entrance ramps are made by right-hand turns, providing for a safer entrance to the freeway by eliminating left-hand turns into opposing traffic (which require queues waiting to make such turns). This also makes logical sense since freeways have a higher capacity than arterials and right-turn ramps serve effectively to absorb capacity and reduce traffic on the arterial.

Some parclos have the right-turning (directional) on-ramp leave the arterial road after the exit ramp intersection. This configuration is often used when another road meets the freeway off-ramp and gives traffic from this road the option of turning right to use the directional on-ramp to enter the freeway.

Traffic exiting the freeway to the arterial road is provided with a long, relatively straight exit ramp, preventing most speed-related rollovers. These exit ramps are also frequently multi-laned to accommodate traffic turning left, right, or going straight ahead in some cases. Traffic signals are commonly installed at the end of the exit ramp to regulate the freeway traffic flowing onto the arterial.

The parclo A4 is particularly well-suited to suburban areas with high traffic levels. Ontario freeways throughout much of the southern portion of the province, especially freeways in the Golden Horseshoe and Ottawa area, use the A4 parclo. These interchanges also exist on some highways in the Montreal area. One issue in suburban areas is the presence of three conflict points in each direction for pedestrians and non-motorised vehicles, the first of which is a moderate speed, low visibility conflict.

Caltrans favors this form for some recent projects, for example the reconstruction of I-880 and other highways in the San Francisco Bay Area and the Greater Los Angeles Area. They often replaced previous full cloverleafs. All exiting traffic for both directions has a relatively straight ramp and is controlled by a traffic light. Running off the road on an entering ramp is much less likely than on an exiting ramp. Metering lights are a common feature on the entering ramps.

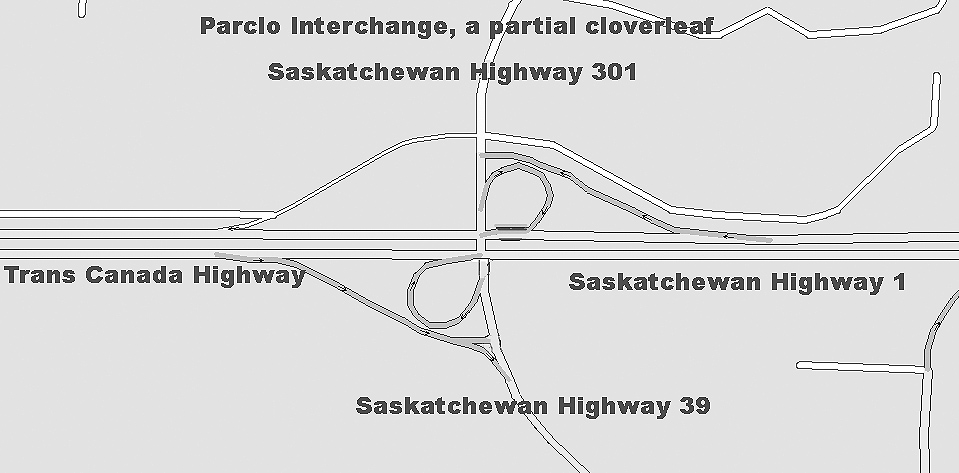
An A4 parclo at Saskatchewan Highway 1 (the Trans Canada Highway), Saskatchewan Highway 39 and Saskatchewan Highway 301. The eastbound directional onramp is located further south of the overpass and is not pictured.

The junction of Saskatchewan Highway 1 (east-west), Saskatchewan Highway 39 (south, part of the CanAm route) and Saskatchewan Highway 301 (north) is an A4 parclo. Highway 1 serves as the freeway, while Highway 39/301 is the arterial road.

=== B4 ===
The parclo B4 interchange superficially appears to be a mirror image of the parclo A4. However, the B4 design provides freeway-to-arterial ramps without traffic lights, while traffic turning left from the arterial must cross opposing traffic. Although this design has the potential to flood the arterial with more freeway traffic than the parclo A4, one particular advantage is the ability to coordinate the traffic signals on the arterial in both directions independently. This is useful when there is more through-movement traffic on the arterial than turning traffic.

=== North American examples ===
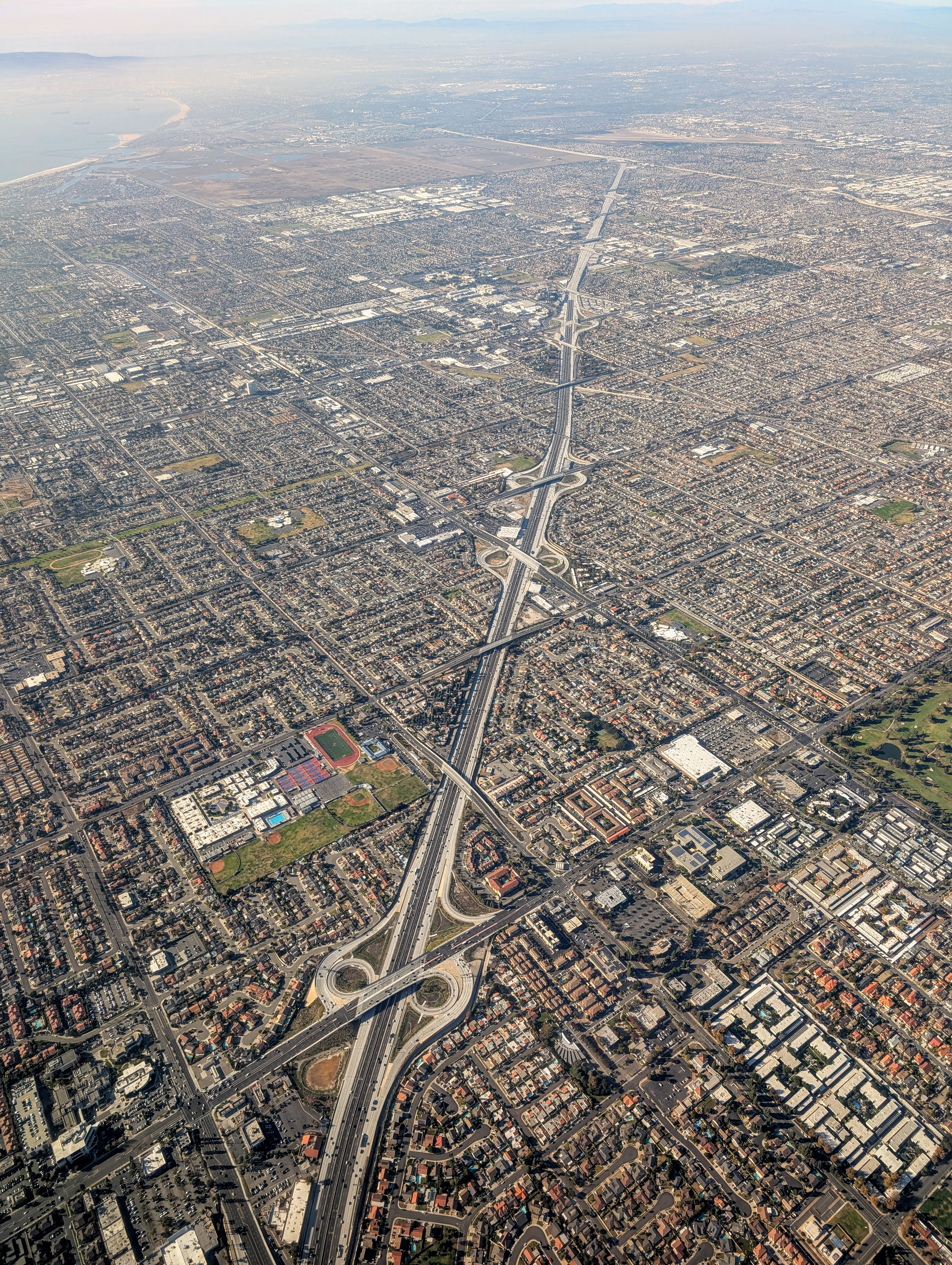
Aerial view of a succession of partial cloverleaf interchanges on I-405 in Orange County, California. The closest one in this image, at Brookhurst Street in Fountain Valley, was originally a full cloverleaf interchange, remnants of which are still visible.

There are B4 designs in Alberta:

- Deerfoot Trail & 17 Ave in Calgary
- Macleod Trail & Anderson Road in south Calgary: This parclo B4 is subject to the traffic flooding problem on a daily basis. Traffic coming off the Macleod Trail freeway overwhelms Anderson Road, resulting in significant delays and frequent accidents, despite the higher maximum speed limit on Anderson Road than Macleod Trail. The style of intersection was made necessary due to the presence of a small private cemetery in one quadrant of the interchange: under Alberta's Cemeteries Act burial sites cannot be seized.

Three exist in British Columbia. In addition, the Solomon Pond Road interchange on I-290 in Northborough, Massachusetts, was converted from a B2 interchange to a B4 interchange in the mid-1990s with the construction of the Solomon Pond Mall. Also, the West Road interchange on I-75 in Woodhaven, Michigan, was upgraded from a B2 to a B4 in the mid 1980s after suburban sprawl had made the B2 interchange obsolete.

In Indiana, the B4 design along IN 37 at its Bloomington interchange with IN 45/46 was retained when the former route was converted to become I-69's exit 120 in 2018.

At least four B4 designs are known to exist in Kentucky:

- Cumberland Parkway interchange with US 27 north of Somerset, currently six ghost ramps sit on the northeast part of the interchange for anticipation for the Somerset Northern Bypass extension.
- The US 127 interchange with Interstate 64 in Frankfort.
- US 127 has a second B4 interchange at the Bluegrass Parkway near Lawrenceburg, about 15 miles (24 km) south of the I-64 crossing. This particular interchange is a conversion from a four-loop design at the location of one of the toll booths on the Bluegrass Parkway before its conversion into a freeway. Toll booths were located directly below US 127; through traffic used the through lanes, while both entering and exiting traffic shared a lane directly to the right of the through lanes. The old design was standard for interchanges at toll booths in Kentucky's parkway system of controlled-access toll roads; even though tolls have been removed from all of the roads, many of the old designs still exist at former toll booth sites.
- The Taylorsville Road interchange with the I-264 Watterson Expressway in Louisville. The B4 design was necessary in this case because of the angle at which Taylorsville Road crosses the Watterson.

The US 83 interchange on I-80 in North Platte, Nebraska, has also recently been upgraded to a B4 from a diamond.

The parclo B4 is less common in Ontario than the parclo A4, with the only examples being the following:

- Highway 406/St. David's Road interchange on the border of St. Catharines and Thorold
- Highway 402/Highway 40 interchange in Sarnia
- Highway 17/Municipal Road 55 interchange in Sudbury
- the interchange at Lauzon Parkway and the E. C. Row Expressway in Windsor

There are two such interchanges in Saskatoon, Saskatchewan, along Circle Drive, at College Drive and Attirdge Drive/Preston Avenue N.

The following B4 interchanges were changed from full cloverleafs:

- U.S. 73/K-7 at U.S. 24/U.S. 40/State Avenue near Basehor, Kansas, was changed in 2008.
- I-695 at U.S. 40 in Catonsville, Maryland, was changed in 2005/2006.
- U.S. 14/U.S. 52 at Civic Center Drive in Rochester, Minnesota, was changed from a cloverleaf in 2004/2005.
- I-5 at South 38th Street in Tacoma, Washington, was changed in the mid 1990s.

Some parclo B4 interchanges such as the intersection of Interstate 40 and U.S. Route 401 in Raleigh, North Carolina, have been fitted with signals at each ramp meeting the arterial in order to allow more lanes on the offramps. This technique along with the ability to provide two-way signal progression along the arterial allows the parclo B4 to handle an extremely high flow of traffic along the arterial.

=== Other variations ===
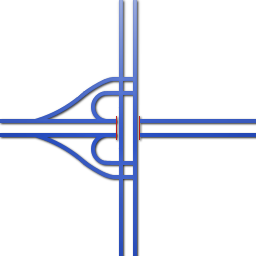
A parclo AB2 interchange or folded diamond. Sample: The US 10/MN 23 interchange in Saint Cloud, Minnesota 45.566448°N 94.138929°W

A parclo AB3 interchange (hybrid). Samples: The Laurensberg interchange in Aachen, Germany 50.804072°N 6.075574°E and US 74/NC 51 interchange near Matthews, North Carolina 35.125862°N 80.705334°W

Parclo designs with only two quadrants are commonly referred to as folded diamonds, due to their similarity with diamond interchanges. Sometimes the ramps in a folded diamond are actually local streets; surface roads upgraded to higher standards often do this to save money on land acquisition. This type of interchange long predates the parclo; the Merritt Parkway and Queen Elizabeth Way, both built in the 1930s, used mainly folded diamonds and cloverleaves. Another example of this is Highway 401's interchange with Highway 2 east of Tilbury (Exit 63): the ramps also have intersections fairly close to the freeway to allow traffic to continue on a rural country road (Jeannette's Creek Road / McKinlay Road) which formerly met Highway 2. One of the examples in Asia includes the Clark South exit in SCTEX, which is a AB2 parclo interchange.

Depending on traffic and land needs, hybrid designs, such as the parclo AB and parclo A3, can be created. A notable example of a parclo AB interchange includes the Highway 417 and the Woodroffe Avenue interchange in Ottawa. Other variants, not describable using Ontario's system, eliminate one or more outside ramps, while leaving the loop ramps in those quadrants. In the United States, folded diamonds are frequently used in interchanges with roads that have a railroad line closely paralleling the surface street; entrance/exit ramps are not permitted to have level crossings in modern American practice.

== Implementation ==
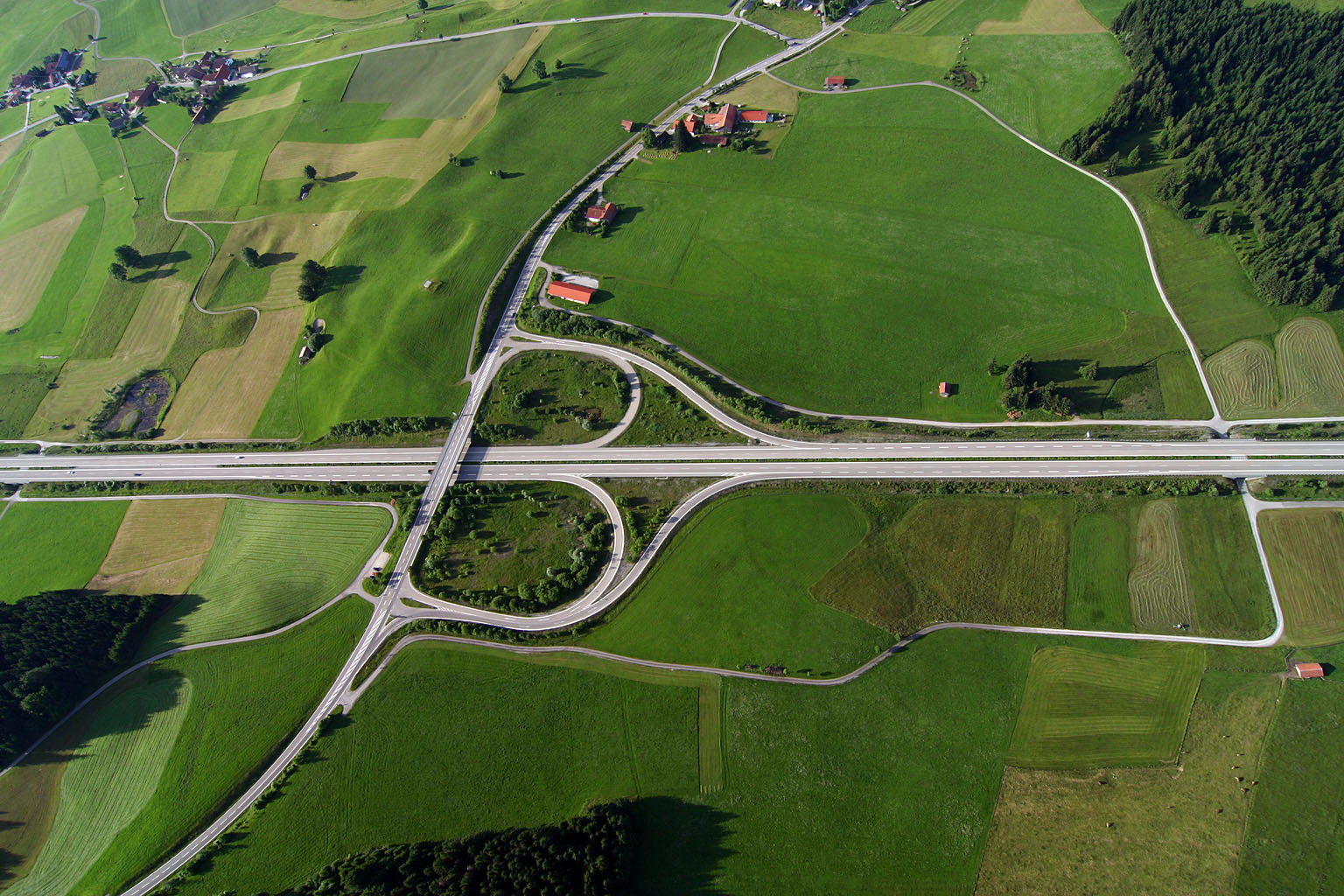
An Autobahn parclo interchange variation in Germany. 47.6413°N 10.5278°E The Nesselwang interchange on Autobahn 7

In California, Caltrans currently has a policy that whenever cloverleaf interchanges between freeways and surface streets are being rebuilt, they are turned into parclo interchanges by removing some of the loop ramps (or in rare cases bridges will be added between adjacent loop ramps—see cloverleaf interchange for details).

Various forms of parclo interchanges are used on the North Luzon Expressway in the Philippines. The configuration of parclo interchanges allows for the consolidation of toll barriers at points where onramps and offramps run alongside each other. A single large barrier can serve each onramp/offramp pair simultaneously, reducing construction and operation expenses at through junctions. When possible, such as at terminal junctions, trumpet interchanges are preferred since they only require one large toll barrier for all four on/off-ramps.
