= Massachusetts Route 117 =

Highway in Massachusetts

Route 117
- Route 117 highlighted in red

Route information
- Maintained by MassDOT
- Length: 31.0718 mi (50.0052 km)

Major junctions
- West end: Route 12 in Leominster
- I-190 at the Leominster–Lancaster line; Route 70 in Lancaster; I-495 in Bolton; Route 62 from Stow to Maynard
- East end: US 20 in Waltham

Location
- Country: United States
- State: Massachusetts
- Counties: Worcester, Middlesex

Highway system
- Massachusetts State Highway System; Interstate; US; State
← Route 116	→ Route 118

Route 117 is a 31.0718-mile-long (50.0052 km) east–west state highway in Massachusetts, running from Route 12 in Leominster in northeast Worcester County to U.S. Route 20 (US 20) in Waltham in central Middlesex County.

== Route description ==
Route 117 begins in the city of Leominster, near the city center, and passes southeast along New Lancaster Road before having an interchange with Interstate 190's Exit 17, just over the city line into Lancaster. In Lancaster the route heads eastward, crossing two branches of the Nashua River while having a short, quarter-mile concurrency with Route 70 south of Fort Devens. The route then crosses into Bolton, crossing Route 110 near the Bolton Flats State Wildlife Management Area. It then passes through the center of town before crossing I-495 at Exit 27. It serves as the northern terminus of Route 85 before crossing into Middlesex County and the town of Stow.

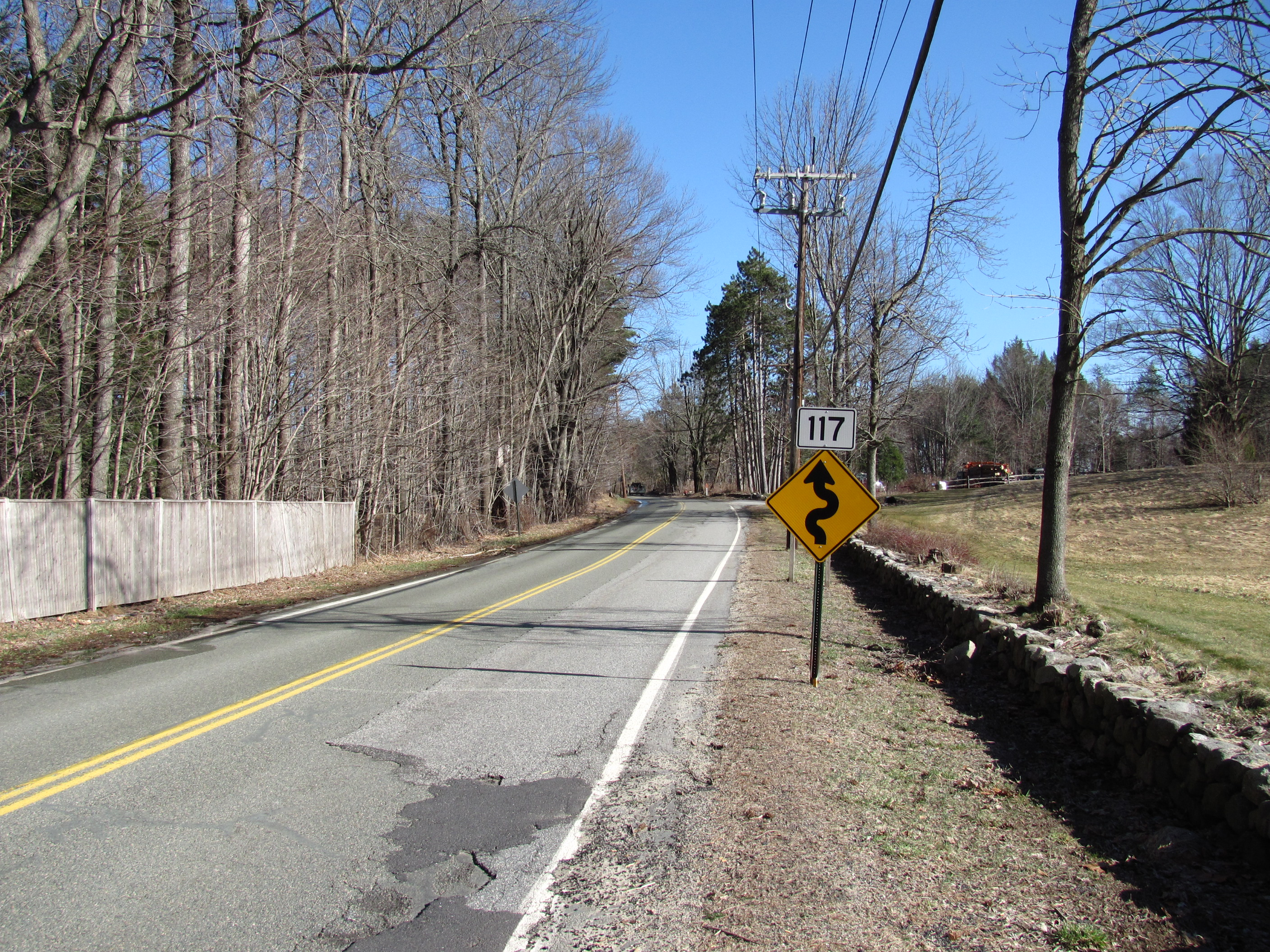
Eastbound in Lincoln near Drumlin Farm

In Stow, the route passes through the countryside before meeting Route 62 at the center of town. The two routes head eastward concurrently, entering into Maynard. The routes split just after crossing the Assabet River, with Route 117 heading in a more southeastern direction. The route crosses Route 27 before entering Sudbury. It crosses through the southern tip of Concord and enters the town of Lincoln over the Sudbury River.

In Lincoln, Route 117 passes through the southwest end of town, intersecting Route 126 and the Fitchburg Line south of the Lincoln station before crossing into Weston. In Weston the route bends southeastward through the Silver Hill, Hastings and Kendal Green sections of town before entering Waltham. Serving as the city's Main Street, the route crosses I-95 and its concurrent route Highway 128 without an interchange before ending at U.S. Route 20, which in turn continues Main Street through Waltham's downtown.

== Major intersections ==
County	Location	mi	km	Destinations	Notes
Worcester	Leominster	0.00	0.00	Route 12 to Route 13 – Sterling, Fitchburg	Western terminus
Worcester	Leominster–Lancaster line	3.0	4.8	I-190 to Route 2 – Worcester, Fitchburg, Concord, NH	Exit 17 on I-190; diamond interchange
Worcester	Lancaster	5.8	9.3	Route 70 north to Route 2 – Lunenburg, Devens	Western end of Route 70 concurrency
Worcester	Lancaster	6.1	9.8	Route 70 south – Boylston	Eastern end of Route 70 concurrency
Worcester	Bolton	7.1	11.4	Route 110 – Harvard, Ayer, Clinton	
Worcester	Bolton	11.1	17.9	I-495 – Marlboro, Taunton, Lowell, Lawrence	Exit 70 on I-495; partial cloverleaf interchange
Worcester	Bolton	11.5	18.5	Route 85 south – Hudson, Marlborough	Northern terminus of Route 85
Middlesex	Stow	16.1	25.9	Route 62 west – Hudson, Clinton	Western end of Route 62 concurrency
Middlesex	Maynard	18.1	29.1	Route 62 east – Concord, Bedford	Eastern end of Route 62 concurrency
Middlesex	Maynard	19.3	31.1	Route 27 – Acton, Sudbury	
Middlesex	Lincoln	25.0	40.2	Route 126 to Route 2 / Route 2A – Concord, Bedford, Wayland, Framingham	
Middlesex	Waltham	31.07	50.00	US 20 to I-95 / Route 128 – Marlboro, Watertown	Eastern terminus
1.000 mi = 1.609 km; 1.000 km = 0.621 mi: Concurrency terminus
