= Northborough =

Northborough may refer to:

- Northborough, Cambridgeshire, a village and civil parish in Cambridgeshire, England
- Northborough, Massachusetts, a town in Worcester County, Massachusetts, United States
  - Northborough (CDP), Massachusetts, a census-designated place in Northborough, Massachusetts
- Northborough, Slough, an area of Slough in Berkshire, England (List of places in Berkshire)
