= Indian Lake (Michigan) =

Lake in the state of Michigan, United States

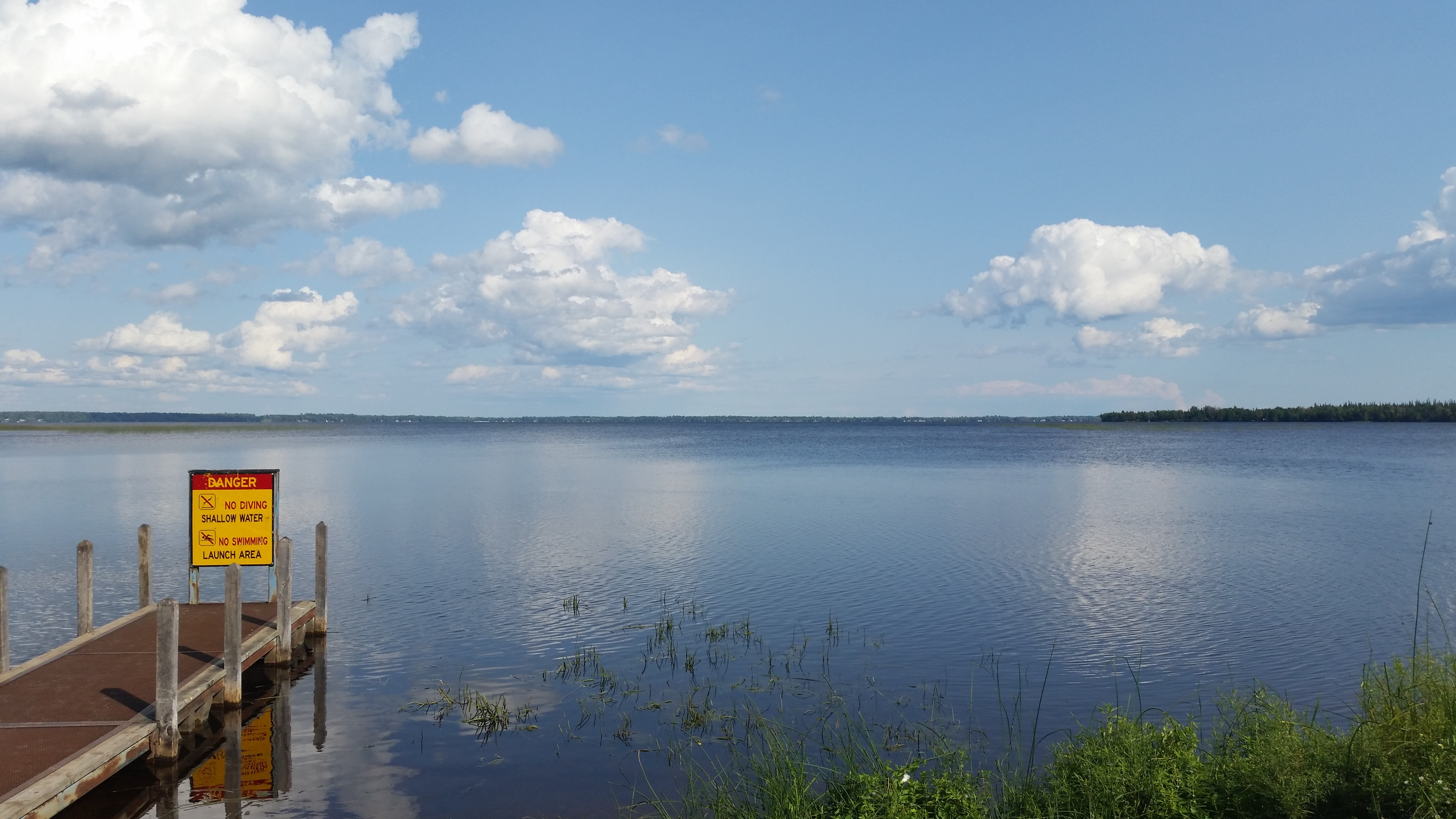
At over 8,400 acres (33.99 km^{2}), Indian Lake in Schoolcraft County is by far the largest lake using the name.

Indian Lake is a common name of many waterbodies within the U.S. state of Michigan. According to the Geographic Names Information System (GNIS), there are at least 38 bodies of water in the state that use the Indian Lake name. These bodies of water may include lakes, reservoirs, streams, swamps, or canals with the Indian Lake name or variations.

All information pertaining to the county, coordinates, and elevation are retrieved from the corresponding GNIS identification website. Lakes that provide no area measurements are likely very small and have no published information listing their size.

Name	County	Coordinates	Elevation	Area	GNIS ID
Eagle Lake (Note: Also named as Davies Lake or Indian Lake)	Gogebic	46°09′21″N 89°08′20″W	1,690 ft (520 m)	20.65 acres (8.4 ha)	1619792
Indian Lake	Barry	42°26′15″N 85°28′09″W	912 ft (278 m)	99 acres (40.1 ha)	628983
Indian Lake	Livingston	42°44′15″N 83°53′22″W	846 ft (258 m)	75 acres (30.4 ha)	628984
Indian Lake	Oakland	42°47′55″N 83°12′33″W	988 ft (301 m)	58 acres (23.5 ha)	628985
Indian Lake	Mecosta	43°39′15″N 85°06′27″W	1,014 ft (309 m)	—	628986
Indian Lake	Osceola	43°57′44″N 85°24′01″W	1,220 ft (370 m)	85 acres (34.4 ha)	628987
Indian Lake	Gladwin	44°09′07″N 84°21′09″W	837 ft (255 m)	51 acres (20.6 ha)	628988
Indian Lake	Ogemaw	44°13′29″N 84°00′35″W	823 ft (251 m)	17.2 acres (7.0 ha)	628989
Indian Lake	Roscommon	44°15′43″N 84°26′02″W	1,217 ft (371 m)	—	628990
Indian Lake	Iosco	44°20′50″N 83°39′01″W	781 ft (238 m)	218 acres (88 ha)	628991
Indian Lake	Grand Traverse	44°41′23″N 85°28′56″W	869 ft (265 m)	57 acres (23.1 ha)	628992
Indian Lake	Oscoda	44°46′52″N 84°13′41″W	1,188 ft (362 m)	18 acres (7.3 ha)	628993
Indian Lake	Kalkaska	44°48′28″N 84°55′50″W	1,214 ft (370 m)	69 acres (27.9 ha)	628994
Indian Lake	Marquette	46°35′32″N 88°05′06″W	1,683 ft (513 m)	86 acres (34.8 ha)	628995
Indian Lake	Cass	41°59′45″N 86°12′43″W	751 ft (229 m)	499 acres (202 ha)	628997
Indian Lake	Kalamazoo	42°09′05″N 85°29′10″W	846 ft (258 m)	758 acres (307 ha)	628998
Indian Lake	Allegan	42°37′30″N 85°37′14″W	768 ft (234 m)	11 acres (4.5 ha)	628999
Indian Lake	Menominee	45°45′02″N 87°25′42″W	804 ft (245 m)	—	629000
Indian Lake	Iron	46°02′35″N 88°29′44″W	1,421 ft (433 m)	196 acres (79 ha)	629001
Indian Lake	Berrien	41°50′04″N 86°26′50″W	712 ft (217 m)	—	1618910
Indian Lake	Oscoda	44°46′03″N 83°58′45″W	935 ft (285 m)		1620297
Indian Lake	Gogebic	46°12′35″N 89°23′10″W	1,683 ft (513 m)	93 acres (37.6 ha)	1620298
Indian Lake	Lake	44°07′27″N 86°00′19″W	738 ft (225 m)	19 acres (7.7 ha)	1620299
Indian Lake (Note: This lake also gives namesake to Indian Lake State Park.)	Schoolcraft	45°59′20″N 86°19′56″W	610 ft (190 m)	8,400 acres (34 km^{2})	1620300
Indian Lake	Newaygo	43°40′14″N 85°49′31″W	912 ft (278 m)	33 acres (13.4 ha)	1620976
Indian Lake	Montcalm	43°25′12″N 85°26′00″W	902 ft (275 m)	250 acres (100 ha)	1622467
Indian Lake (Note: Described by Geographic Names Information System as a swamp)	Allegan	42°45′42″N 85°37′56″W	791 ft (241 m)	—	628999
Indian Lake Creek (Note: Indian Lake Creek is geologically a creek and not a lake. Although it uses the Indian Lake name, it is part of the Tittabawassee River system and has no defined length or area.)	Gladwin	44°06′39″N 84°18′29″W	768 ft (234 m)	—	629002
Indian Lake Drain (Note: Indian Lake Drain is a drainage ditch that connects Indian Lake (Kalamazoo County) to the Portage River to the south. It has no defined length or area.)	Kalamazoo	42°08′05″N 85°29′02″W	850 ft (260 m)	—	1620300
Indian Lakes (Note: Indian Lakes (Kent County) is two closely-connected lakes: East Indian Lake at 15 acres (6.1 ha) and West Indian Lake at 18 acres (7.3 ha).)	Kent	43°11′38″N 85°40′12″W	755 ft (230 m)	33 acres (13.4 ha)	629005
Indian Lakes (Note: Indian Lakes (Alcona County) is three closely-connected lakes: North Indian Lake at 17 acres (6.9 ha), Middle Indian Lake at 9.9 acres (4.0 ha), and South Indian Lake at 10.3 acres (4.2 ha).)	Alcona	44°34′07″N 83°41′10″W	883 ft (269 m)	37.2 acres (15.1 ha)	629006
Indian Spring Lake	Kent	42°54′06″N 85°46′08″W	604 ft (184 m)	—	2570896
Indian Town Lake	Delta	45°45′01″N 86°50′13″W	584 ft (178 m)	—	1620311
Little Indian Lake	Berrien	41°54′44″N 86°16′55″W	722 ft (220 m)	66 acres (26.7 ha)	630643
Little Indian Lake	Menominee	45°45′26″N 87°25′44″W	807 ft (246 m)	25 acres (10.1 ha)	630644
Rudd Lake (Note: Also named as Indian Lake or Rude Lake)	Oscoda	44°47′36″N 84°13′22″W	1,184 ft (361 m)	9.2 acres (3.7 ha)	636360
Spring Lake (Note: Also named as Indian Lake)	Roscommon	44°15′45″N 84°26′16″W	935 ft (285 m)	13 acres (5.3 ha)	1620297
Stone Lake (Note: Also named as Indian Lake or Stony Lake)	Gogebic	46°11′33″N 89°03′05″W	1,742 ft (531 m)	38 acres (15.4 ha)	1621780

== See also ==
- Indian Lake, an unincorporated community along Indian Lake in Cass County.
- Indian Lake State Park (Michigan)
- Indian River (Michigan)
