= Little Indian Lake (Berrien County, Michigan) =

- Location within Michigan
- Location: Berrien County, Michigan
- Coordinates: 41°54′44″N 86°16′55″W
- Type: lake
- Surface area: 75.246 acres (30.451 ha)

Little Indian Lake is a lake in Berrien County, in the U.S. state of Michigan.

Little Indian Lake was so named on account of its diminutive size when compared to the nearby Indian Lake. It is 75.246 acres (30.451 ha) in size.
