= Interstate 190 (Massachusetts) =

Interstate Highway in Massachusetts

Interstate 190
- I-190 highlighted in red

Route information
- Auxiliary route of I-90
- Maintained by MassDOT
- Length: 19.26 mi (31.00 km)
- Existed: 1983–present
- NHS: Entire route

Major junctions
- South end: I-290 in Worcester
- Route 12 in Worcester; Route 140 in Sterling; Route 117 at the Lancaster–Leominster line
- North end: Route 2 in Leominster

Location
- Country: United States
- State: Massachusetts
- Counties: Worcester

Highway system
- Interstate Highway System; Main; Auxiliary; Suffixed; Business; Future; Massachusetts State Highway System; Interstate; US; State
← Route 189	→ Route 192

Interstate 190 (I-190) is an auxiliary Interstate Highway in the US state of Massachusetts, maintained by the Massachusetts Department of Transportation (MassDOT). Spanning approximately 19 miles (31 km) along a south–north axis, it is a spur route of I-90 (the Massachusetts Turnpike) in Central Massachusetts. However, its southern terminus exists at its split from I-290 in Worcester, which itself splits from the turnpike in Auburn. Its northern terminus lays at an interchange with Route 2 in Leominster.

== Route description ==
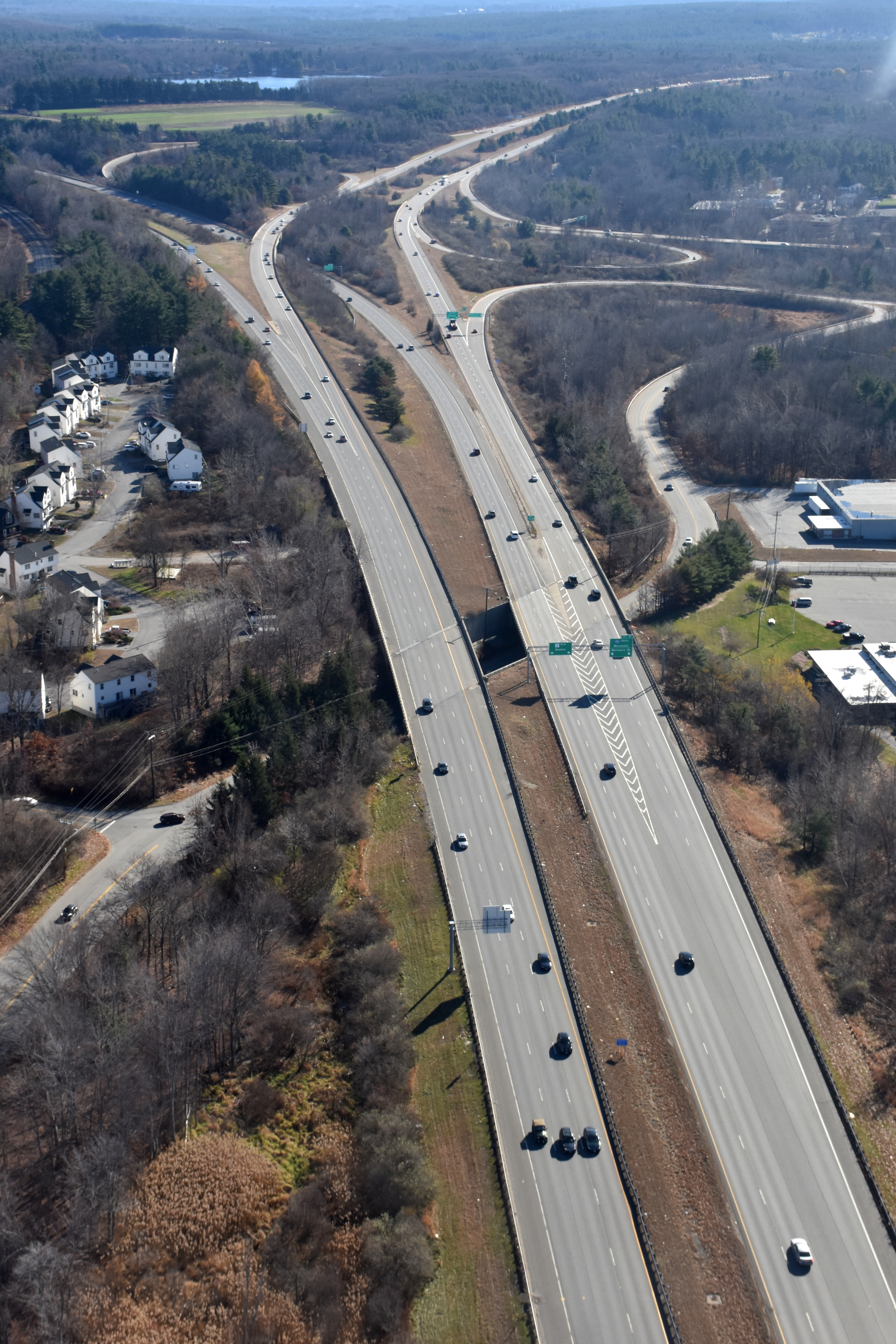
I-190 interchange with Route 2 in Leominster

The southern terminus of I-190 is in Worcester. Near the former site of the Greendale Mall, there is an interchange with Route 12 before the highway passes along the eastern shore of Indian Lake and continues through the northern points of Worcester. In West Boylston, I-190 has a second interchange with Route 12 before turning northwest into Holden. The freeway later crosses the Quinapoxet River and then curves to the northeast reentering West Boylston. I-190 intersects Route 140 and then intersects Route 12 once more in Sterling. There is an exit for Route 117 in Lancaster. North of Johnny Appleseed State Park and Lancaster Town Forest, I-190 reaches its northern terminus at Route 2 and Mechanic Street in the city of Leominster.

A portion of the highway was built with extra-wide shoulders, which are painted green, to prevent runoff from contaminating the nearby Wachusett Reservoir.

== Exit list ==
All interchanges were to be renumbered to mileage-based numbers under a project scheduled to start in 2016. However, this project was postponed until November 18, 2019, when MassDOT confirmed that, beginning in late mid-2020, the exit renumbering project will begin. On March 12, 2021, MassDOT announced that the I-190 exit numbers will get renumbered for two days starting on March 21. The entire route is in Worcester County.

Location	mi	km	Old exit	New exit	Destinations	Notes
Worcester	0.000	0.000			I-290 / I-395 south – Marlboro, Norwich, CT	Southern terminus; exit 22 on I-290
Worcester	1.111	1.788	1	1	Route 12 (Gold Star Boulevard / West Boylston Street)	
Worcester	2.346	3.776	2	2	Ararat Street – Holden, Greendale	
Worcester	3.542	5.700	3	3	West Mountain Street / Doyle Road – Holden, Boylston	Southbound exit and northbound entrance
West Boylston	3.980	6.405	4	4	Route 12 – West Boylston	Exit connector enters Worcester before reaching Route 12
Sterling	9.272	14.922	5	9	Route 140 – West Boylston, Princeton	
Sterling	14.123	22.729	6	14	Route 12 to Route 62 – Sterling, Clinton	
Lancaster–Leominster line	16.894	27.188	7	17	Route 117 – Leominster, Lancaster	
Leominster			8B	19B	Route 2 east to Mechanic Street – Boston, Leominster	Route 2 not signed southbound; signed as exit 19 southbound; exit 101 on Route 2
Leominster	19.261	30.998	8A	19A	Route 2 west – Fitchburg	Northern terminus
1.000 mi = 1.609 km; 1.000 km = 0.621 mi: Incomplete access
