= Big Injun Lake =

- Location within Wisconsin Location within the United States
- Location: Menominee County, Wisconsin
- Coordinates: 45.0446614°N 88.5297245°W
- Type: lake
- Surface area: 9 acres (0.036 km^{2})
- Max. depth: 17 feet (5.2 m)
- Surface elevation: 899 feet (274 m)

Big Injun Lake is a natural lake in Menominee County, Wisconsin, in the United States. The surface area of the lake is 9 acres (3.6 ha).

Although there are dozens of place names in Wisconsin containing the word "Indian", Big Injun Lake is the only place in the state using the variant Injun.

== See also ==
- List of lakes in Wisconsin
