= Interstate 290 (Massachusetts) =

Interstate Highway in Massachusetts, United States

Interstate 290
- I-290 highlighted in red

Route information
- Auxiliary route of I-90
- Maintained by MassDOT
- Length: 20.16 mi (32.44 km)
- Existed: 1970–present
- NHS: Entire route

Major junctions
- West end: I-90 / Mass Pike / I-395 / US 20 / Route 12 in Auburn
- Route 146 in Worcester; Route 9 in Worcester; I-190 in Worcester; Route 140 in Shrewsbury
- East end: I-495 in Marlborough

Location
- Country: United States
- State: Massachusetts
- Counties: Worcester, Middlesex

Highway system
- Interstate Highway System; Main; Auxiliary; Suffixed; Business; Future; Massachusetts State Highway System; Interstate; US; State
← Route 286	→ I-291

Interstate 290 (I-290) is an auxiliary Interstate Highway in the US state of Massachusetts, maintained by the Massachusetts Department of Transportation (MassDOT). Spanning approximately 20 miles (32 km), it is signed as an east–west spur route of I-90 (Massachusetts Turnpike) in Central Massachusetts. The route begins in Auburn at I-90 as a northward continuation of I-395. It follows an L-shaped route, the nominally western half of which runs north into the city of Worcester, and, upon leaving the city, turns to the east to its eastern terminus at I-495 in Marlborough. Past I-495, the road continues as the Route 85 Connector to the town of Hudson. The route serves as the main freeway route through Worcester, as well as being part of a longer distance travel corridor through New England, connecting Connecticut and Western Massachusetts with much of New Hampshire and Maine.

== Route description ==
I-290 begins as the continuation of I-395 in Auburn with exits to I-90, Route 12, and the Auburn Mall. I-290 continues north through Worcester into downtown, where Route 146 splits off to the southeast toward Providence, Rhode Island, and I-190 to the north toward the Leominster–Fitchburg area. After Route 146, I-290 has exits for Route 122A, Route 122, downtown, and Route 9. After I-190, I-290 presumes east to a junction with Route 70, then continues over Lake Quinsigamond into Shrewsbury, where it goes northeast. Here, the scenery changes drastically from the Worcester urban area to more wooded areas in Shrewsbury and Northborough. I-290 has a junction with Route 140 and starts east into Boylston and Northborough, where it travels northeast again. I-290 enters Marlborough with an exit for the Solomon Pond Mall and has its final junction with I-495, where it becomes the Route 85 Connector, which continues into Hudson.

== History ==
Originally, I-290 was to rejoin I-90 in Westborough, roughly where I-495 sits now. However, this route would have run through the town centers of Shrewsbury and Northborough. Additionally, I-290 was intended to be extended past I-495 to I-95/Route 128 in Waltham, but this was canceled under pressure from towns along the planned route. A brief two-lane connector heads to Route 85 as a result of this aborted plan. The interchange with I-495 was originally supposed to be a cloverleaf, but, after the plan was canceled, it was modified with a flyover ramp onto I-495 northbound. In 2004, the former exit 12 (current exit 16) was temporarily closed when the Route 146 highway was under construction between the Massachusetts Turnpike and I-290. It was completed in 2007.

=== Milepost-based exit numbering ===
While Massachusetts has used sequential exit numbers since 1964, the 2009 edition of the Manual on Uniform Traffic Control Devices required that all US states submit plans to transition to milepost-based exit numbering by 2012. All interchanges were to be renumbered to milepost-based numbers under a project scheduled to start in 2016. However, this project was indefinitely postponed until November 18, 2019, when MassDOT confirmed that the exit renumbering project will begin, and "dual" milemarkers with I-395 mileage will be installed, in late mid-2020. On July 29, 2021, MassDOT announced that the exit renumbering on I-395 and I-290 will start on August 8, and it lasted for two weeks. The department had stated that it would consider redesignating I-290 as an extension of I-395 if both the exit numbering project and dual mile markers are well-received by motorists.

By 2022, the dual mile markers were removed. Today, the mile markers along I-290 are marked with I-290 shields but represent the I-395/I-290 route as one.

== Exit list ==
Exit numbers on I-290 are a continuation of I-395 exit numbers.

County	Location	mi	km	Old exit	New exit	Destinations	Notes
Worcester	Auburn	0.000	0.000	—	—	I-395 south / US 20 to Route 146 (Route 122A) – Norwich, CT, New London, CT	Continuation south
Worcester	Auburn	0.347	0.558	7	12A	I-90 / Mass Pike / Route 12 north – Boston, Springfield, Auburn	Eastbound exit signed as exit 12 to Route 12 south; westbound exit to Route 12 north; exit 90 on I-90 / Mass Pike
Worcester	Auburn	0.070	0.113	8	12B	Route 12 south – Auburn, Webster	Westbound exit only
Worcester	Auburn	0.930	1.497	9	13	Swanson Road to Route 12 – Auburn	Eastbound signage
Worcester	Auburn	1.700	2.736	9	13	Auburn Street to Route 12 – Auburn	Westbound signage
Worcester	Worcester	3.358	5.404	10	14	Route 12 north (Hope Avenue)	Westbound exit and eastbound entrance
Worcester	Worcester	3.565	5.737	11	15	College Square / Federal Square / Southbridge Street	Signed for Route 146, Millbury eastbound, and Route 12 South westbound.
Worcester	Worcester	4.611	7.421	12	16	Route 146 south to I-90 / Mass Pike – Millbury, Providence, RI	Westbound exit and eastbound entrance; former configuration had complete access via a rotary
Worcester	Worcester	5.265	8.473	13	17	Route 122A (Vernon Street) – Kelley Square	Serves Polar Park
Worcester	Worcester	5.638	9.073	14	18	Route 122 (Grafton Street) – Grafton, Paxton	No westbound entrance
Worcester	Worcester	5.810	9.350	15	19	Shrewsbury Street	Eastbound exit and westbound entrance
Worcester	Worcester	6.137	9.877	16	20	MLK Jr. Boulevard – Downtown Worcester	Serves Union Station, Saint Vincent Hospital, DCU Center, and Polar Park
Worcester	Worcester	6.572	10.577	17 18	21	Route 9 (Belmont Street) to Route 70 north – Lincoln Square, Worcester Regional Airport	Eastbound signage
Worcester	Worcester	6.980	11.233	17 18	21	Route 70 north to Route 9 – Lincoln Square, Worcester Regional Airport	Westbound signage
Worcester	Worcester	7.377	11.872	19	22	I-190 north to Route 12 – Sterling, Leominster, Fitchburg	Southern terminus of I-190; eastbound exit is combined with exit 23
Worcester	Worcester	7.377	11.872	20	23	Burncoat Street to Route 70 (Lincoln Street)	Eastbound signage; combined exit ramp with exit 22
Worcester	Worcester	8.421	13.552	20	23	Route 70 (Lincoln Street), Burncoat Street	Westbound signage
Worcester	Worcester	9.641	15.516	21	24	Plantation Street – Worcester	Eastbound exit and westbound entrance
Worcester	Shrewsbury	10.173	16.372	22	25	Main Street – Shrewsbury, Worcester	
Worcester	Shrewsbury	12.685	20.415	23	26	Route 140 – Shrewsbury, Boylston	Signed as exits 26A (Route 140 south) & 26B (Route 140 north)
Worcester	Northborough	14.855	23.907	24	27	Church Street – Northborough, Boylston	
Worcester	Northborough	17.913	28.828	25A	30A	Hudson Street – Northborough	
Worcester	Northborough	17.925	28.847	25B	30B	Solomon Pond Mall Road – Berlin	To Solomon Pond Mall; exit partially located in Marlborough
Middlesex	Marlborough	20.16	32.44	26	32	I-495 – Cape Cod, Lowell	Signed as exits 32A (I-495 south) & 32B (I-495 north); exit 65B on I-495
Middlesex	Marlborough	20.16	32.44	—	—	To Route 85 – Hudson	Eastern terminus; access via Route 85 Connector
1.000 mi = 1.609 km; 1.000 km = 0.621 mi: Electronic toll collection; Incomplete access

== Gallery ==
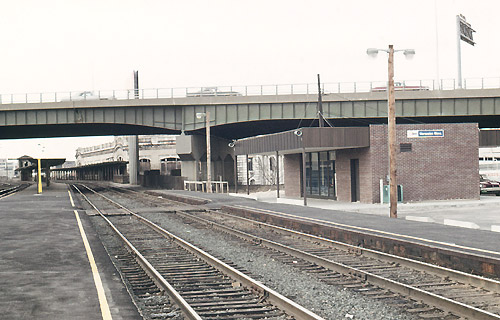
The I-290 viaduct at Union Station in 1976

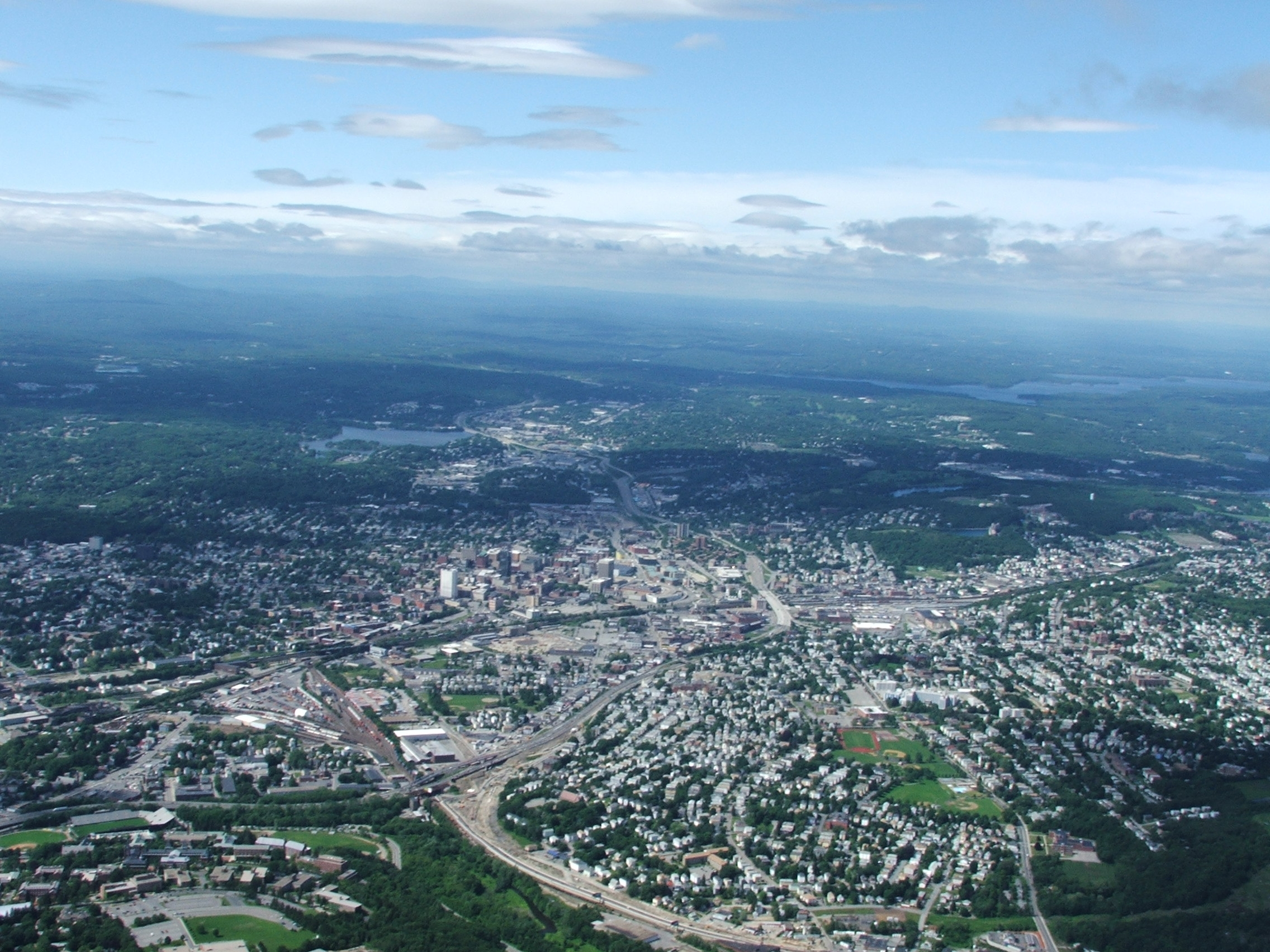
The I-290/Route 146 junction seen under construction as well as downtown Worcester from above looking north

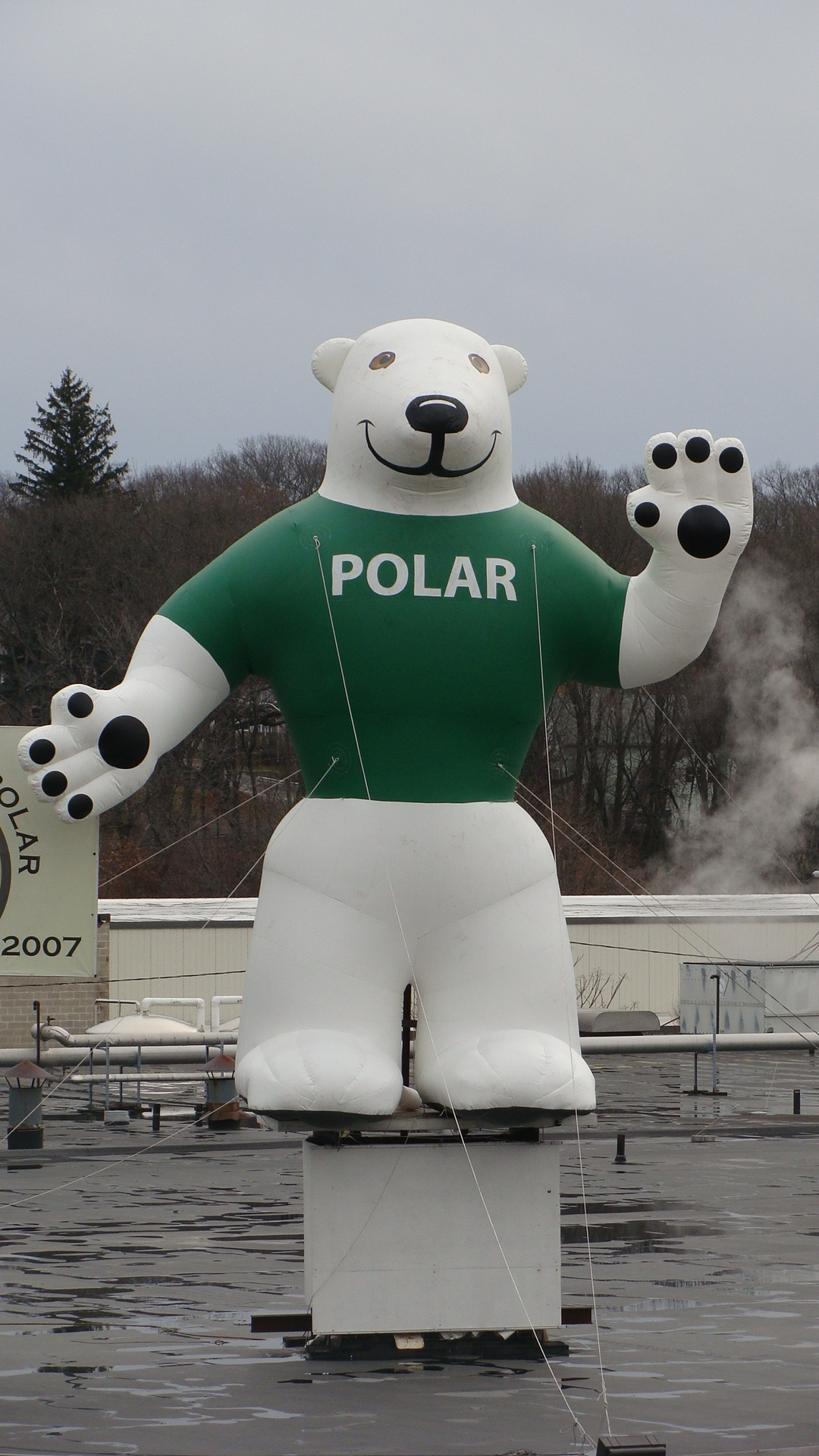
Orson the bear, the mascot of Polar Beverages, is a prominent landmark visible from I-290 in Worcester
