= Solomon Pond Mall =

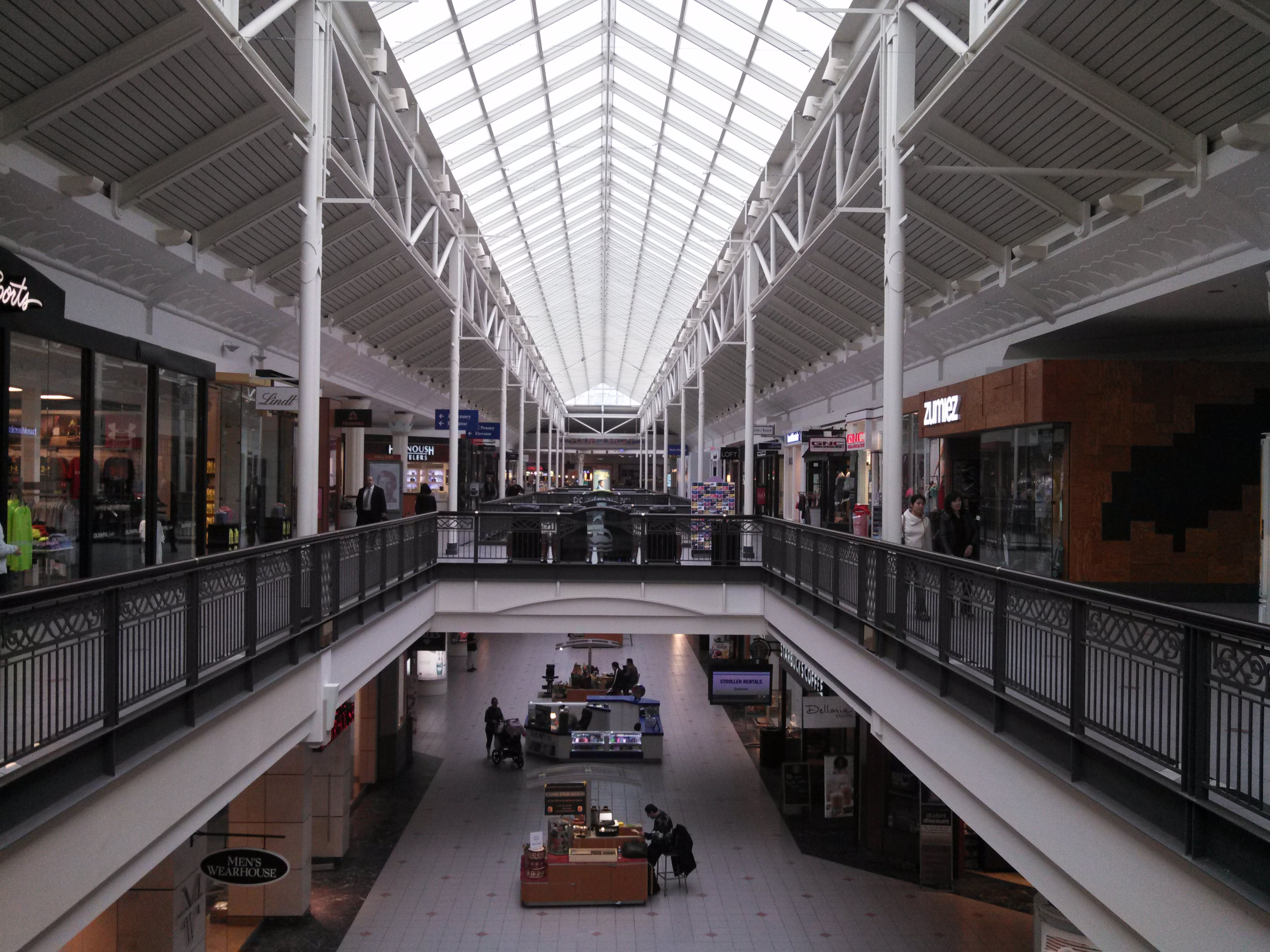
- Location: Marlborough, Massachusetts (with the northern part of the mall in Berlin)
- Coordinates: 42°21′20.3″N 71°36′45.9″W
- Address: 601 Donald Lynch Blvd
- Opened: 1996
- Developer: Simon DeBartolo Group
- Manager: Spinoso Real Estate Group
- Owner: Spinoso Real Estate Group
- Num. of stores: 89
- Num. of anchor tenants: 3 (2 open, 1 vacant)
- Floor area: 886,472 sq ft (82,355.9 m^{2})
- Floors: 2
- Website: visitsolomonpond.com

The Solomon Pond Mall is a two-level enclosed shopping mall located off Interstate 290, near its terminus at Interstate 495, in Marlborough and Berlin, Massachusetts. The mall features JCPenney and Macy's (originally Filene's) as anchors with one vacant anchor last occupied by Sears.

== History ==
The mall opened in 1996 and was one of many that opened along the Interstate 495 corridor from the mid-1980s to the mid-1990s. Initially the mall's location seemed remote as it was located far from other retail. However, the mall was able to strategically target both the affluent and booming western crescent of suburbs of Boston, while simultaneously serving as the largest mall for the Worcester area.

On April 25, 1997, Hoyts Cinemas officially opened their location at the Solomon Pond Mall. Hoyts was what originally occupied the space. The multiplex cinema features 15 screens and 330 seats. In 2003, Regal Cinemas acquired the former Hoyts Berlin 15, which became Regal Solomon Pond Mall 15.

In comparison to other mid-range malls along the Interstate 495 corridor, the Solomon Pond Mall attempted to shoot for the upscale by courting some higher end tenants such as Victoria's Secret, Swarovski Crystal and several jeweler chains.

In March 2006, Filene’s closed, after a decade, and became a Macy’s following its closure.

In 2018, it was announced that Old Navy would relocate out of the building once shared with Sports Authority which closed in 2016, and relocated in the location of the former Abercrombie & Fitch.

On February 15, 2021, it was announced that Sears would be closing as part of a plan to close 34 stores nationwide. The store closed on May 2, 2021.

On August 31, 2023, the mall opened seven new businesses.

On May 6, 2025, it was officially announced that seven new stores will open in the mall from about June 2025 to September 2025.

As of 2024, the mall is managed by Spinoso Real Estate Group. Former owners include Pacific Retail Capital Partners and Simon Property Group. On December 18, it was reported that the majority of the Solomon Pond Mall was sold to an Ohio-based developer for $8.5M. The new owners plan to redevelop parts of the mall.

== Gallery ==
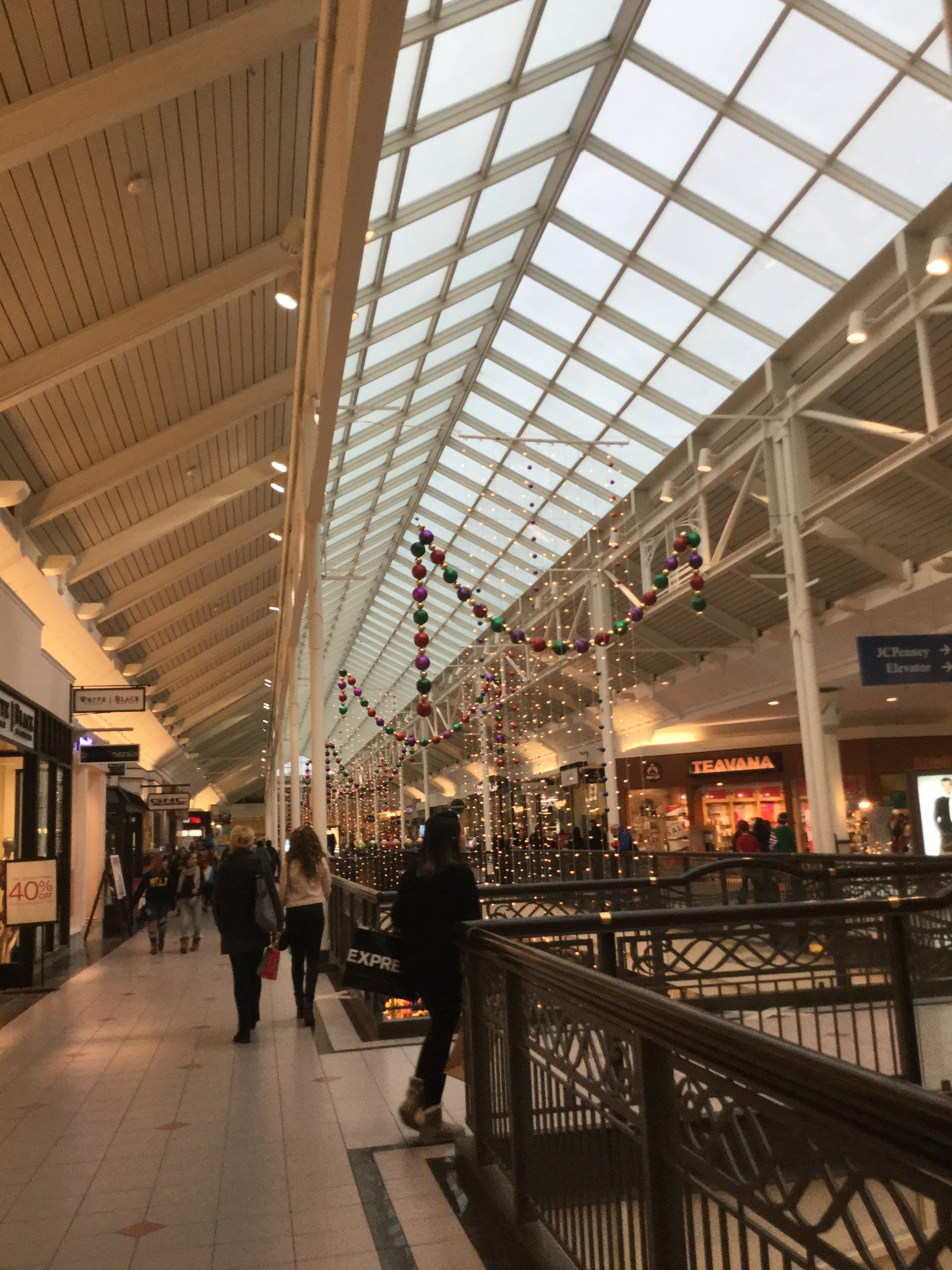
The second floor of the Solomon Pond Mall on Boxing Day 2016

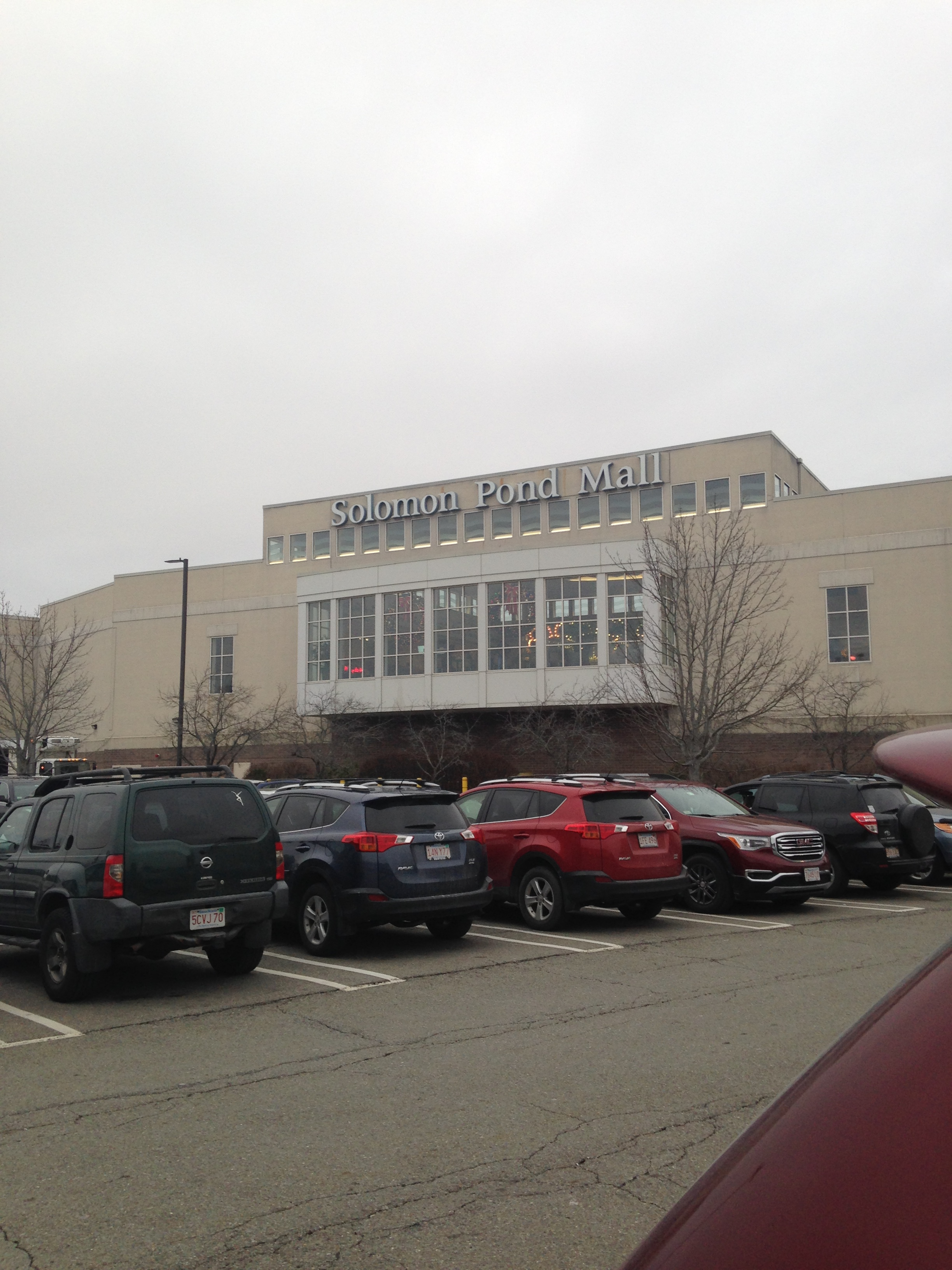
The sign on the Solomon Pond Mall on Boxing Day 2016

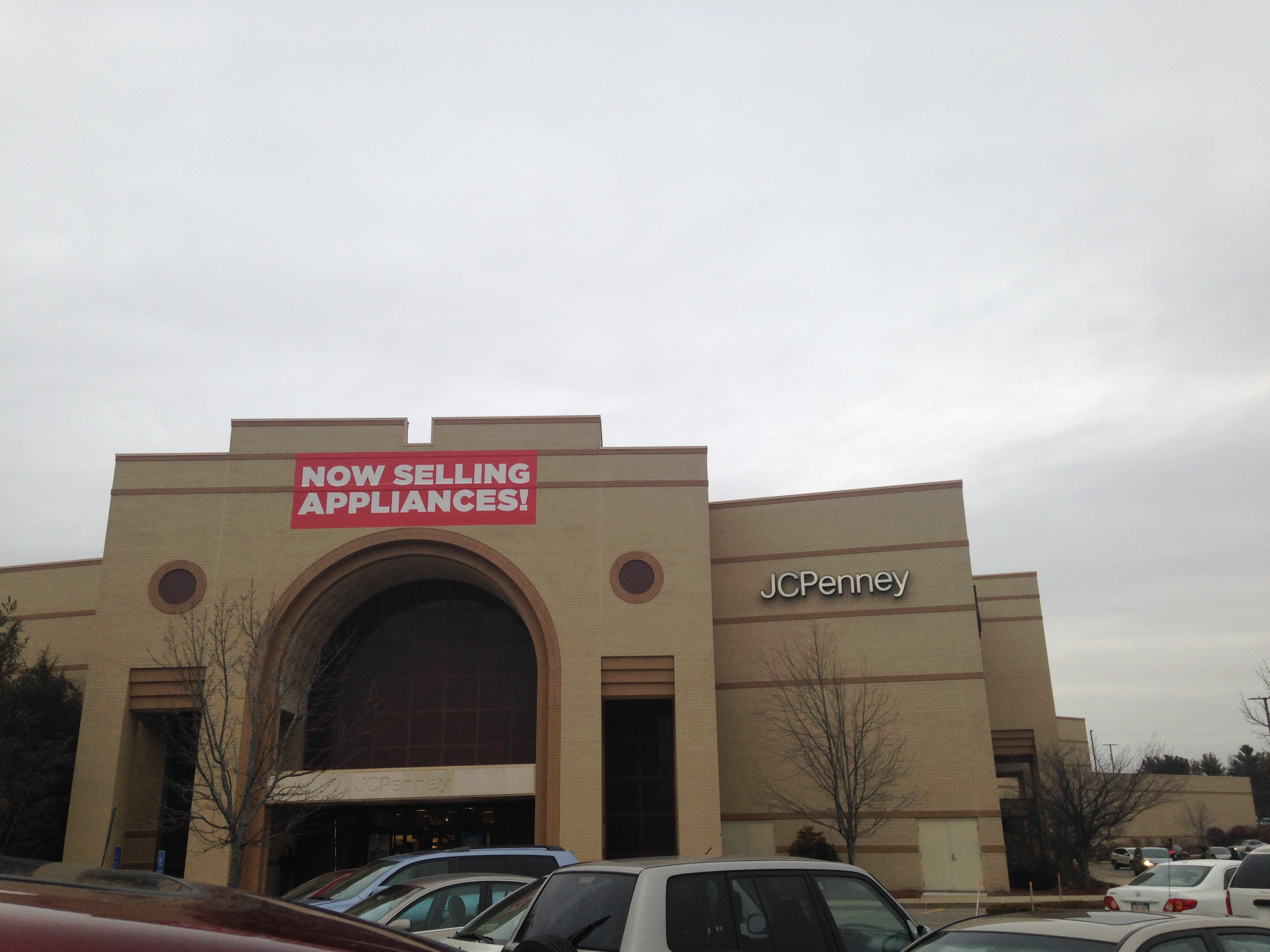
The exterior of JCPenney in the Solomon Pond Mall in 2016 which is now selling appliances, JCPenney stopped selling appliances in 2019
