= Indian Lake (Blue Earth County, Minnesota) =

Lake in Minnesota, United States

- Location within Minnesota
- Location: Blue Earth County, Minnesota
- Coordinates: 44°6′51″N 93°47′12″W
- Type: lake

Indian Lake is a lake in Blue Earth County, Minnesota, in the United States. Indian Lake was named for the Native Americans who settled there.

== See also ==
- List of lakes in Minnesota
