= Indian Lake (Washington County, Rhode Island) =

Lake in Washington County, Rhode Island, United States

- Location within Rhode Island Location within the United States
- Location: Washington County, Rhode Island
- Coordinates: 41.479268°N 71.468391°W
- Basin countries: United States
- Surface elevation: 24 m (79 ft)

Indian Lake is a lake in South Kingstown, Washington County, Rhode Island.
