= Hudson (CDP), Massachusetts =

Hudson, Massachusetts
- Census-designated place
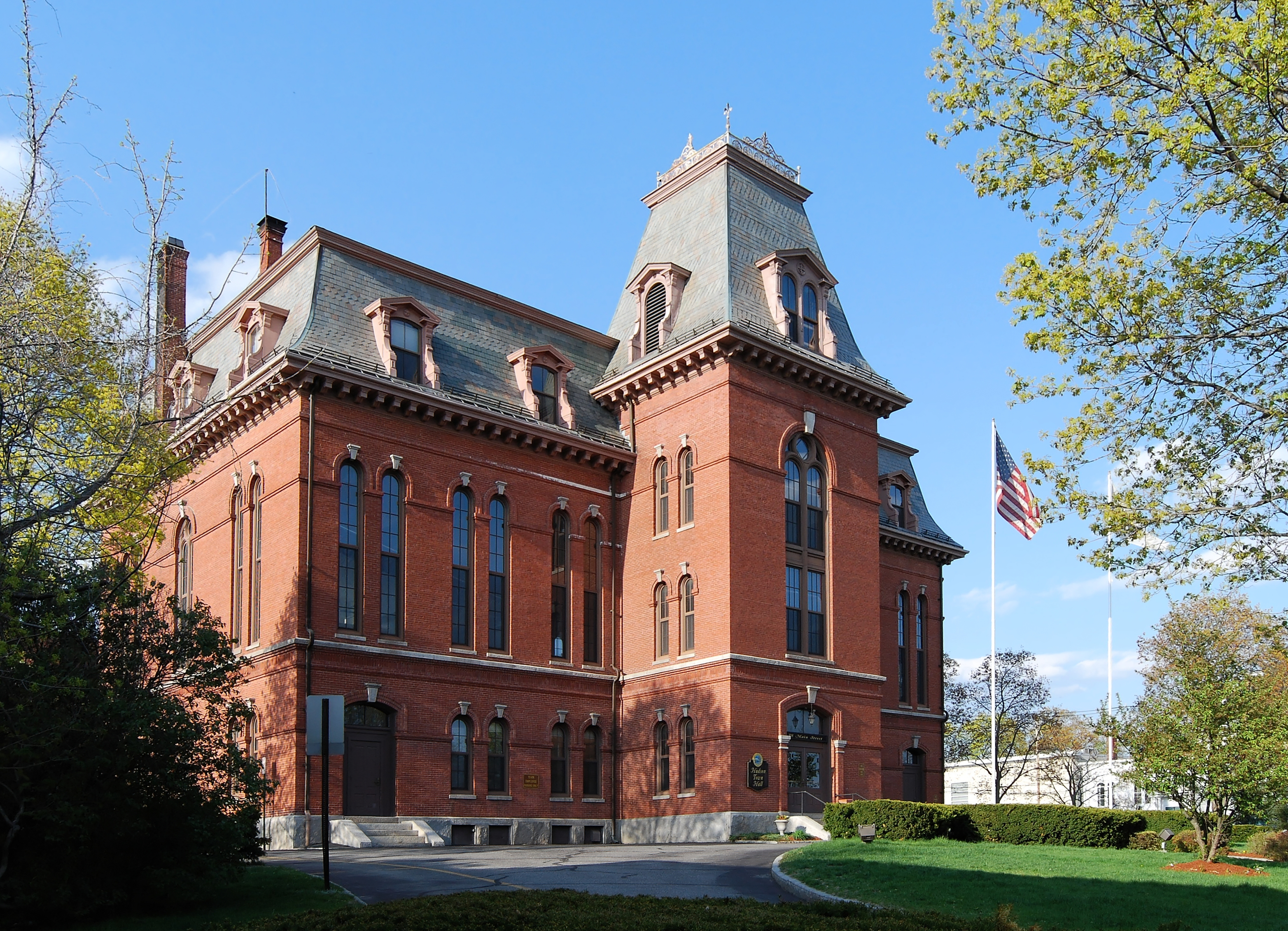
- Hudson Town Hall

- Location in Middlesex County in Massachusetts
- Coordinates: 42°23′32″N 71°33′56″W
- Country: United States
- State: Massachusetts
- County: Middlesex
- Town: Hudson

Area
  - Total: 5.92 sq mi (15.33 km^{2})
  - Land: 5.75 sq mi (14.88 km^{2})
  - Water: 0.17 sq mi (0.45 km^{2})
- Elevation: 217 ft (66 m)

Population (2020)
  - Total: 15,749
  - Density: 2,741.3/sq mi (1,058.42/km^{2})
- Time zone: UTC-5 (Eastern (EST))
  - Summer (DST): UTC-4 (EDT)
- ZIP code: 01749
- Area code: 978
- FIPS code: 25-31575
- GNIS feature ID: 0611243

Hudson is a census-designated place (CDP) comprising the densely developed central part of the town of Hudson in Middlesex County, Massachusetts, United States. The population of the CDP was 15,749 at the 2020 census, out of 20,092 in the entire town.

== Geography ==
The CDP is located on the western edge of Middlesex County at 42°23′32″N 71°33′56″W (42.392285, -71.565646), in the west-central part of the town of Hudson. It is bordered to the south by the city of Marlborough, to the northeast by the town of Stow, and to the northwest and west by the towns of Bolton and Berlin in Worcester County. Within the town of Hudson, the CDP is bordered to the east by Zina Road, Cox Street, Forest Avenue, Old North Road, and Causeway Street, and to the southwest by Chapin Road, Brigham Street, Washington Street, and the Assabet River Rail Trail.

Massachusetts Route 62 passes through the community as Central Street and Main Street, leading northeast 5 miles (8 km) to the center of Stow and west 4 miles (6 km) to the center of Berlin. Massachusetts Route 85 runs through the community as Washington Street and Lincoln Street, leading north 3 miles (5 km) to Route 117 in Bolton and southwest 3.5 miles (5.6 km) to the center of Marlborough. Route 85C turns southwest from Route 85 in the southern part of the CDP and leads 1.5 miles (2.4 km) to the I-495/I-290 interchange.

According to the United States Census Bureau, the CDP has a total area of 5.92 square miles (15.33 km^{2}), of which 5.75 square miles (14.89 km^{2}) are land and 0.18 square miles (0.47 km^{2}), or 2.96%, are water. The Assabet River passes through the center of the CDP, flowing northeastward to join the Concord River in Concord. Via the Concord River, the CDP is part of the Merrimack River watershed.

== Demographics ==
Historical population
Census	Pop.	Note	%±
1960	7,897		—
1970	14,283		80.9%
1980	14,156		−0.9%
1990	14,267		0.8%
2000	14,388		0.8%
2010	14,907		3.6%
2020	15,749		5.6%
U.S. Decennial Census

As of the census of 2000, there were 14,388 people, 5,652 households, and 3,809 families residing in the CDP. The population density was 971.2 people/km^{2} (2,515 people/mi^{2}). There were 5,790 housing units at an average density of 390.8 units/km^{2} (1,012 units/mi^{2}). The racial makeup of the CDP was 93.91% White, 0.88% Black or African American, 0.15% Native American, 1.22% Asian, 0.03% Pacific Islander, 1.64% from other races, and 2.18% from two or more races. Hispanic or Latino of any race were 3.48% of the population.

There were 5,652 households, out of which 30.4% had children under the age of 18 living with them, 54.2% were married couples living together, 9.7% had a female householder with no husband present, and 32.6% were non-families. 27.1% of all households were made up of individuals, and 10.6% had someone living alone who was 65 years of age or older. The average household size was 2.52 and the average family size was 3.10.

In the CDP, the population was spread out, with 23.2% under the age of 18, 7.0% from 18 to 24, 33.5% from 25 to 44, 23.2% from 45 to 64, and 13.1% who were 65 years of age or older. The median age was 37 years. For every 100 females, there were 96.2 males. For every 100 females age 18 and over, there were 93.9 males.

The median income for a household in the CDP was $55,063, and the median income for a family was $67,643. Males had a median income of $43,815 versus $35,068 for females. The per capita income for the CDP was $25,167. About 3.3% of families and 5.3% of the population were below the poverty line, including 4.0% of those under age 18 and 10.5% of those age 65 or over.
