= Indian Lake (Massachusetts) =

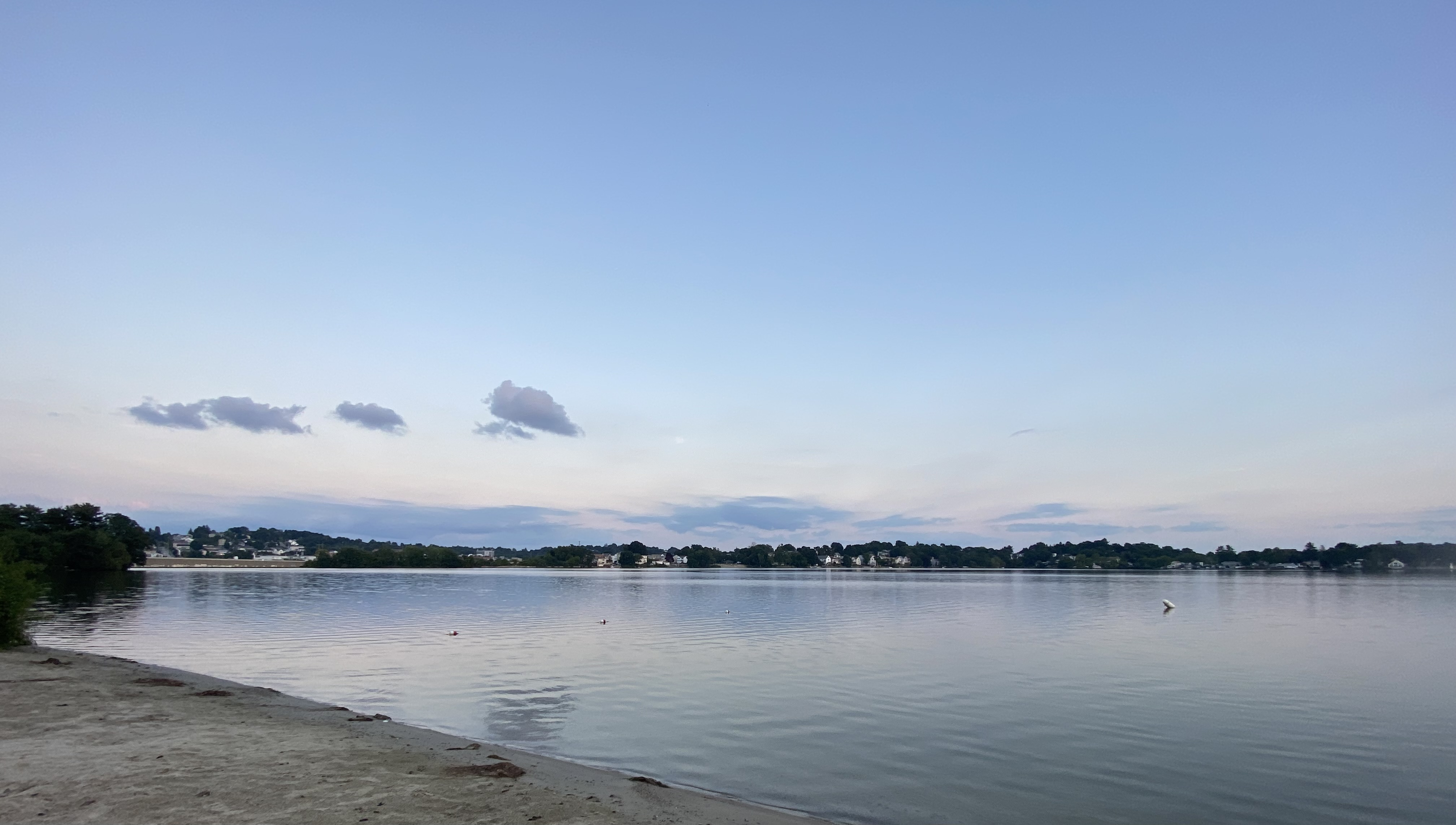
- Indian Lake from Shore Park

- Location within Massachusetts Location within the United States
- Location: Worcester, Massachusetts
- Coordinates: 42°18′00″N 71°48′24″W
- Type: Reservoir
- Basin countries: United States
- Average depth: 8 ft (2.4 m)
- Max. depth: 15 ft (4.6 m)
- Surface elevation: 538 ft (164 m)
- Dam: Indian Lake Dam
- Islands: Sears Island

Indian Lake, previously known as North Pond, is a lake located in northern Worcester, Massachusetts. The mean and maximum depths are 8 and 15 feet (2.4 and 4.6 m) respectively. The bottom is sand and rock. The shoreline is heavily developed with three public parks, including two public beaches and a public boat launch, residential dwellings and commercial buildings.

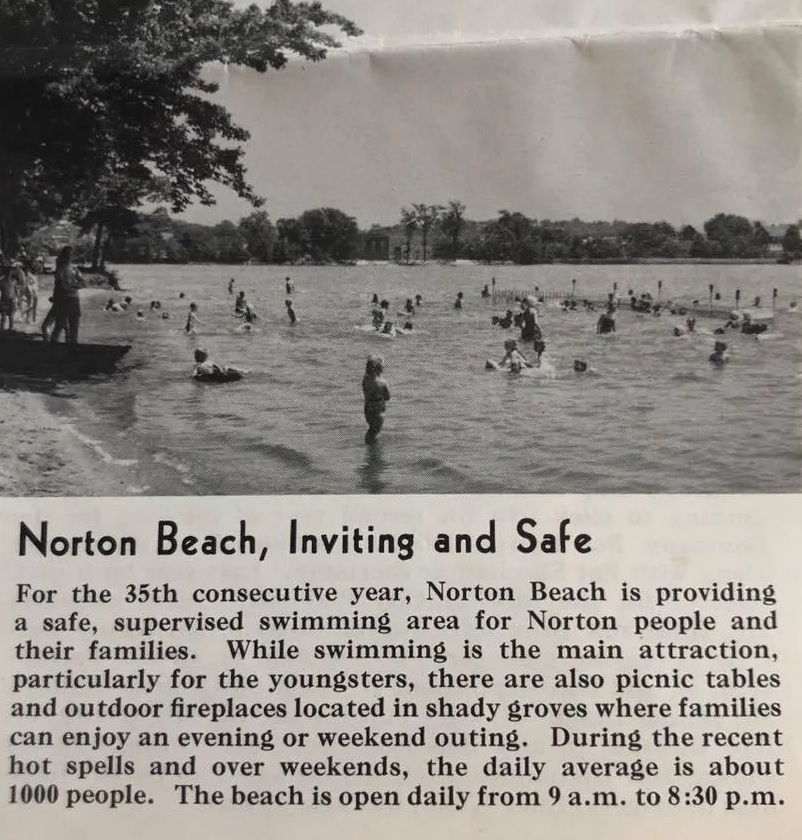
Norton Beach Indian Lake Worcester MA in the 1950s

== History ==
Indian Lake was once known as North Pond. The pond encompassed about forty acres, and was surrounded by marshes and farmland. Its outlet, Mill Brook, was the main source of power for many of the industrial mills in Worcester, including North Works of the American Steel and Wire Company.

In the early 1800’s, waterways were important in the transportation of goods between major cities and areas. However, the growing city of Worcester was land-locked at the heart of the Massachusetts commonwealth. A project was set forth to link Worcester with Providence, Rhode Island via a canal along the Blackstone River.

North Pond was the peak source of water for the Blackstone River. In 1828, a dam was built at the outlet of the pond to increase the amount of water for use by the Blackstone Canal. This new reservoir was part of a system of lakes and ponds used to control the flow of water in the Blackstone Canal. However, the canal was a short lived project, that vanished due to the rising use of the rail system and complaints from mill owners within the Blackstone River watershed. Indian Lake was also home to a local ice harvesting operation. During the days before automated ice-making machines, the harvesting of ice on local lakes and ponds was a big business employing hundreds of local residents. During a few short weeks in the winter, men would begin the harvest in mid-January or when the ice was about eighteen inches thick.

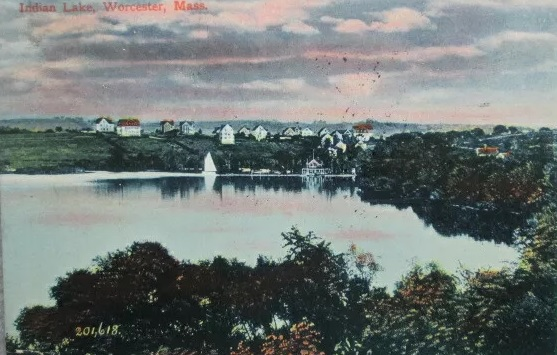
Postcard photo of Indian Lake in Worcester MA circa 1900.

Ice harvesting began in Worcester in 1848, with Dr. Benjamin F. Heywood harvesting ponds and providing ice to the local establishments. A few years later, Benjamin Walker bought the ice harvesting business and in 1855, established the Walker Ice Company with Samuel S. Sweetser. A storage facility was established on the western shore of Indian Lake, where Morgan Park is now located. This facility would harvest approximately 15,000 to 18,000 tons of ice per year. The Walker Coal and Ice Company continued to harvest ice from Indian Lake, until its storage facility burned down in 1935. On November 24, 1990, a horse-drawn sleigh used to carry ice was dragged from the muddy bottom of Indian Lake during an Indian Lake Watershed Association organized cleanup in which the lake level was lowered for removal of debris. The sleigh was found and dug out of the mud and dragged onto the shore near Morgan Park, where it remains as a historical reminder of the ice harvesting industry on Indian Lake.

== Sears Island ==
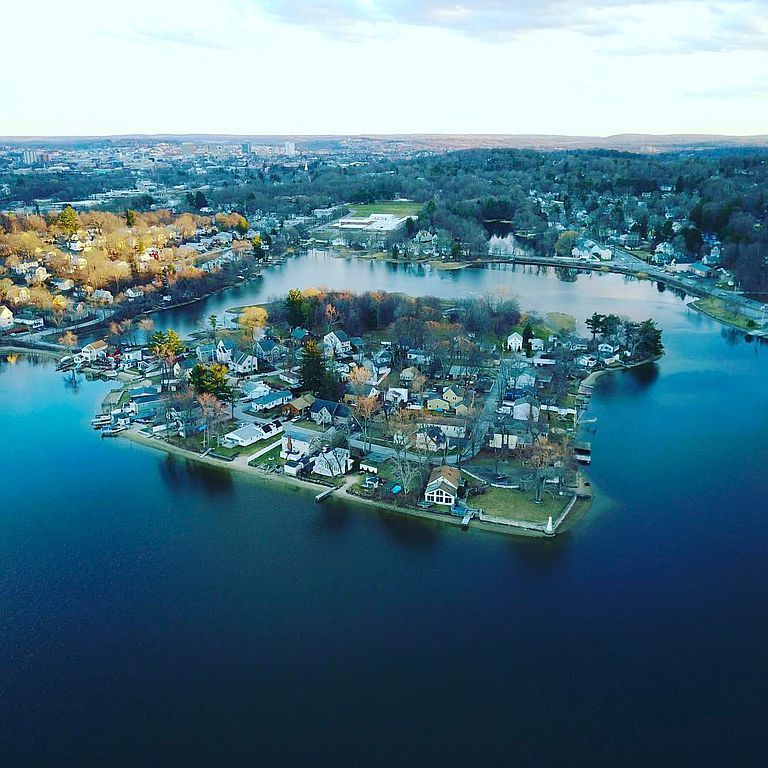
Sears Island in Indian Lake

With the construction of a dam, a nine-acre island emerged from the rising waters. The island became known as Sears Island, named after a man who owned the island and other local land, although the first name of the man is unclear. The island was purchased from Sears by O’Connell Real Estate Agency. The agency divided the island into 25 by 100 foot lots to be sold for housing. In its early years, the island was used as a summer recreation area. People would set up wooden platforms for tents and spend their summer at this island retreat. Also on the island was the Worcester Shooting Gallery where area enthusiasts would shoot clay pigeons over the lake.

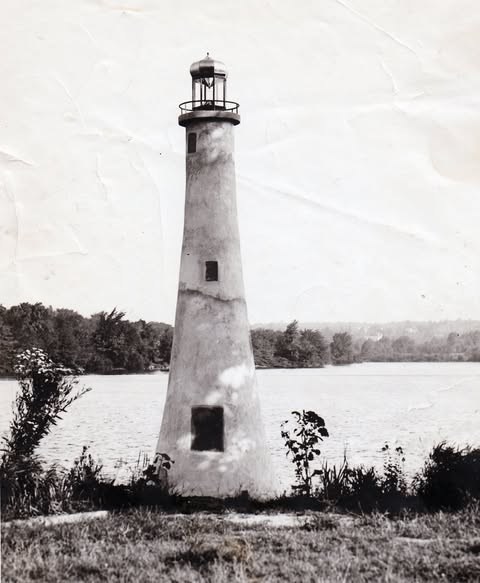
Sears Island, Indian Lake Lighthouse

The only way to get to the island in early years was by small boats. Around 1915, logs were placed from the island to the mainland, and soon a nine foot wide wooden bridge was built. In 1926, a concrete causeway was constructed and is still in use today. The first permanent resident, Soren Andersen, moved onto Sears Island around 1921. He was soon followed by Augustus Talbot in 1922, who bought and moved into the Worcester Shooting Gallery building. During the next couple years, about twenty more families moved onto the island. In 1923, the Sears Island Improvement Association was formed to bring some of the modern conveniences of the city to the island. Through its work, the island received gas, electricity, and a sewer system in 1925, and running water in 1930. 24 The isolation of the island created a close community where residents knew just about everyone else on the island. Although the closeness of the houses may lack privacy, this same closeness contributes to the security of knowing one’s neighbors and having the sense of watching after each other. Many families moved into the community together, and have continued living there for generations.

== Facilities ==
Shore Park (115 Shore Drive) offers a 5-acre (2.0 ha) beach that is open to the public July 1 to late August and offers a lifeguard from noon to 7 pm. Located on Shore Drive, this park had phase 1 renovations complete in spring 2018 which included a new bathhouse and improved stormwater management to protect the lake. This park features a large beach on the north end of Indian Lake, as well as picnic areas.The beach is typically open from early July through mid August, with lifeguards provided by the dedicated staff a at the Greendale YMCA. Management of this facility is made possible due to a partnership with the Greendale YMCA and Bancroft School. Phase 2 improvements are anticipated to include more stormwater management improvements, relocating the park entrance and upgrading the parking lot.

Indian Lake Park (Cleason Street) offers a one acre beach open to the public with swimming access. Indian Lake Beach is located on the eastern bank of Indian Lake. The small, approximately 1.6 acre park, is situated in an entirely residential neighborhood. This facility is typically staffed with lifeguards from early July through mid August.

Morgan Landing (Grove Street) does not offer a public beach, but it does offer boating and 11.2 acres (4.5 ha) of land. At Morgan's Landing, also known as Morgan Park, you can launch a boat, motorized or non-motorized. You can also enjoy the other amenities this water-focused park has to offer. Such amenities include picnic tables, benches, tennis court, boat ramp, fishing dock and walking path along the shoreline. Morgan's Landing, you will find the only state boat ramp located in the city of Worcester.

== Wildlife ==
The fish population was most recently studied during a 1996 summer survey. Eleven species were collected including white perch, yellow perch, largemouth bass, golden shiner, black crappies, bluegills, pumpkinseeds, yellow bullhead, brown bullhead, carp and white suckers. Northern pike were captured during other sampling efforts in 1994. The lake has been stocked with northern pike and tiger muskies on a fairly regular basis beginning in 1981.

== Boating ==
The north shore of Indian Lake was home to the Shore Park Community Sailing Club (SPCSC), which was directed by Paschal "Pat" Pavini who started the club in 1990. Eventually, the SPCSC evolved into the Indian Lake Yacht Club (ILYC). The club included youth and adult sailing programs as part of its offerings. In the late 1990s, the racing team from ILYC won the Gallagher Cup in Boston, emblematic of the Central Division Junior Championship. ILYC dissolved after Pat Pavini died in 2009.

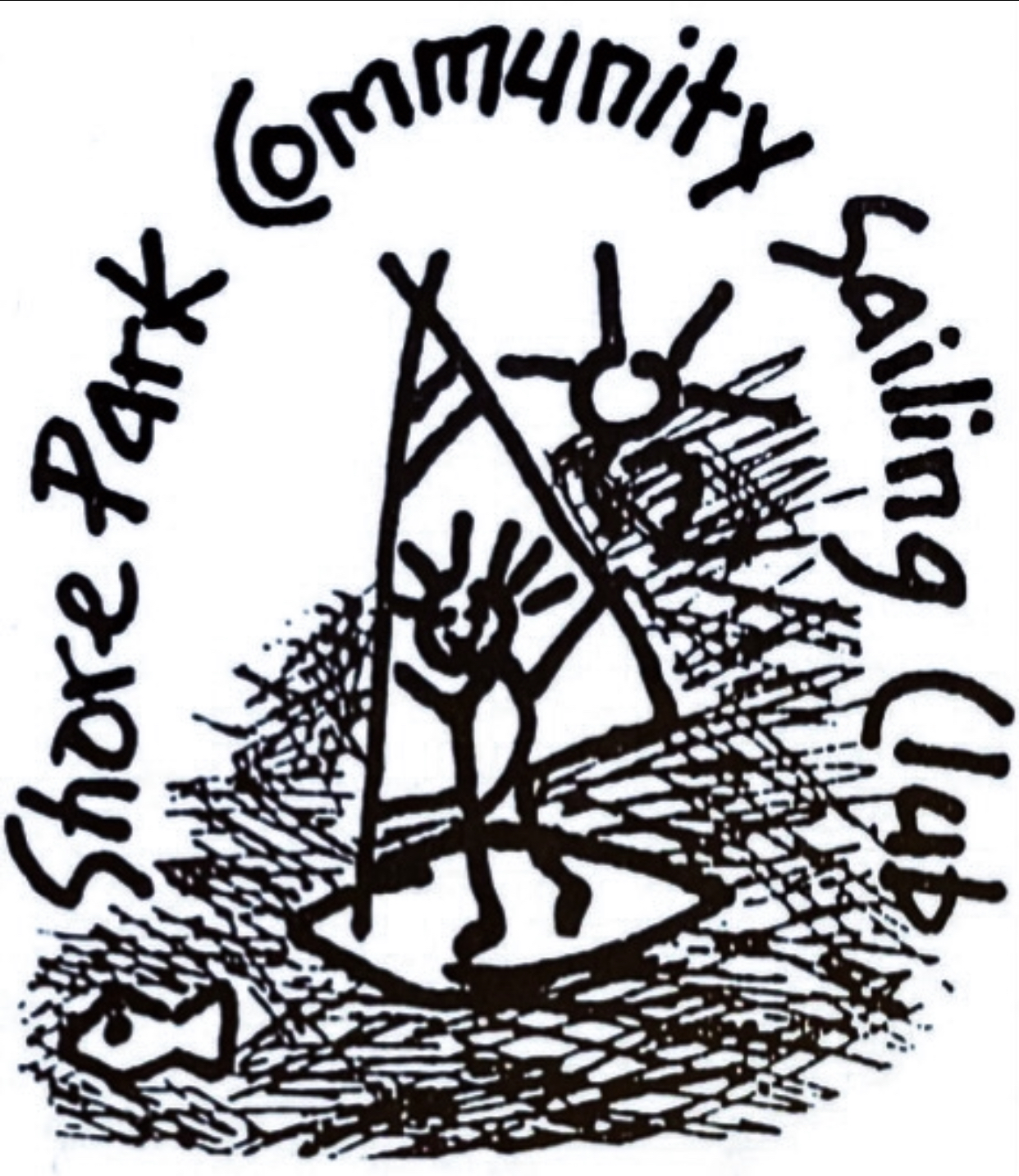
The first logo used for the Shore Park Community Sailing Club

The public beach is owned by The City of Worcester and maintained by the Bancroft School and staffed by the Greendale YMCA during summer months.
