= Indian Lake (Cass County, Michigan) =

Lake in the state of Michigan, United States

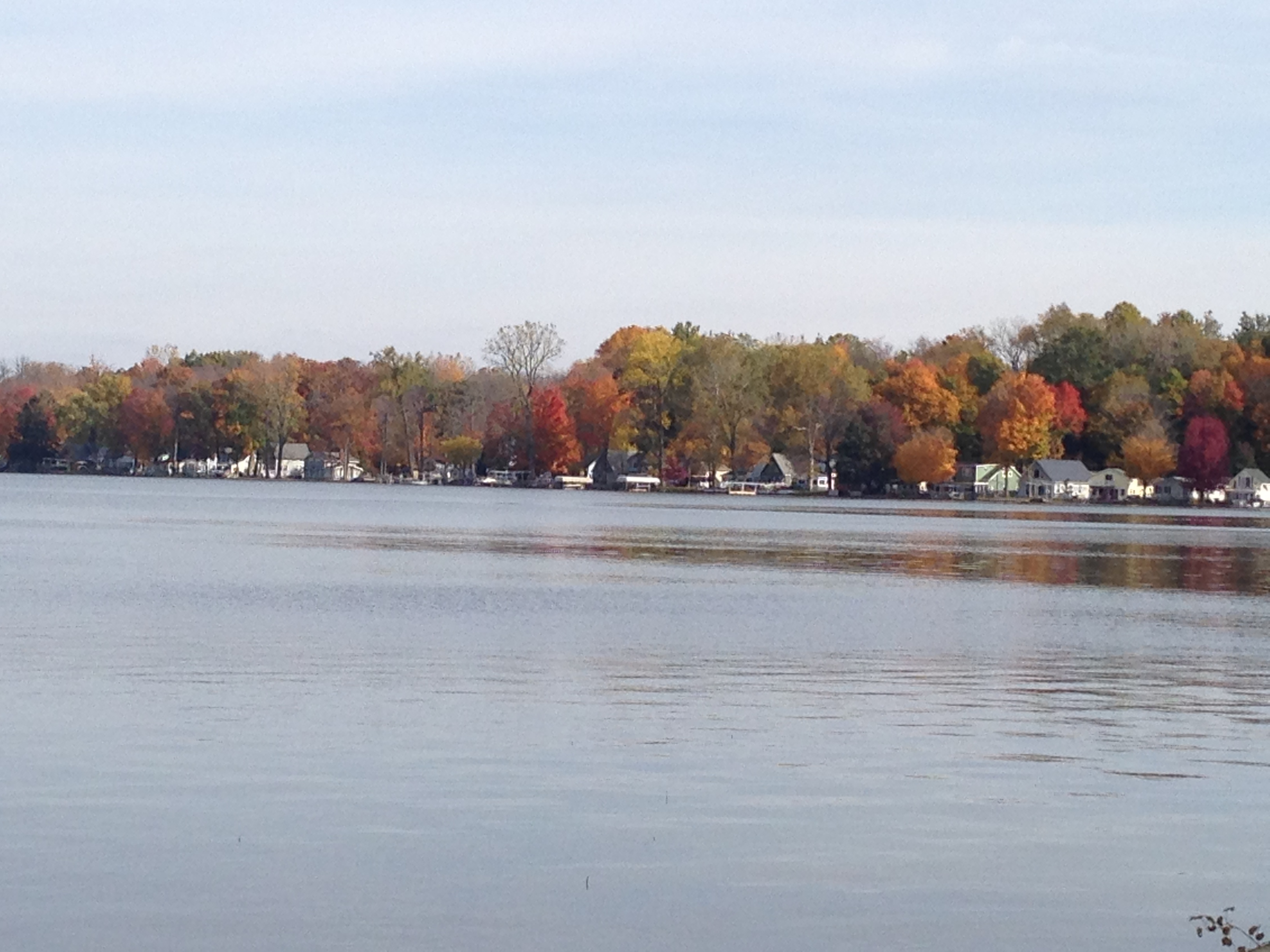

- Location within the state of Michigan
- Location: Cass County, Michigan
- Coordinates: 41°59′41″N 86°12′15″W
- Type: Lake
- Basin countries: United States
- Surface area: 506 acres (2.0 km^{2})
- Max. depth: 28 feet (8.5 m)
- Surface elevation: 751 feet (229 m)

Indian Lake is a lake in Cass County in southwestern Michigan in the United States. It is approximately 5 mi (8.0 km) west of Dowagiac. It is a spring-fed lake. The lake was named for Indians who once settled there.

There are approximately 220 homes on the lake, of which a third are on leased land. On the west side is Indian Lake Hills Golf Course, with 3 nine-hole courses: East, West and North.

On the east end there is Indian Yacht Club, with a well-maintained boat ramp. Membership is required to use the ramp.

== See also ==
- List of lakes in Michigan
