= Northborough (CDP), Massachusetts =

Northborough, Massachusetts
- CDP
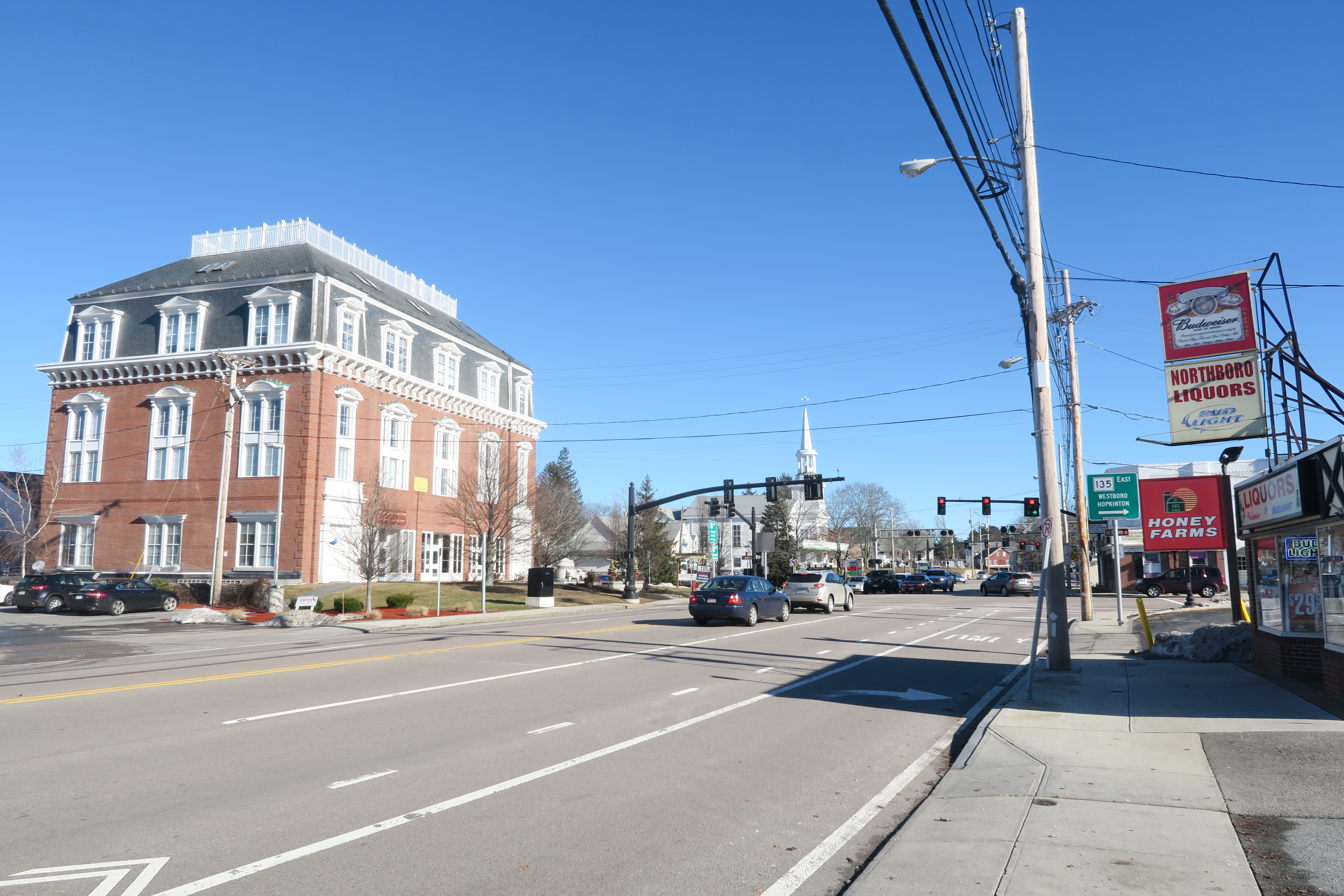
- Main Street

- Location in Worcester County and the state of Massachusetts.
- Coordinates: 42°18′43″N 71°38′54″W
- Country: United States
- State: Massachusetts
- County: Worcester

Area
  - Total: 3.31 sq mi (8.58 km^{2})
  - Land: 3.29 sq mi (8.51 km^{2})
  - Water: 0.027 sq mi (0.07 km^{2})
- Elevation: 302 ft (92 m)

Population (2020)
  - Total: 6,474
  - Density: 1,971.0/sq mi (761.02/km^{2})
- Time zone: UTC-5 (Eastern (EST))
  - Summer (DST): UTC-4 (EDT)
- ZIP code: 01532
- Area code: 508
- FIPS code: 25-46785
- GNIS feature ID: 0610881

Northborough is a census-designated place (CDP) in the town of Northborough in Worcester County, Massachusetts, United States. The population was 6,474 at the 2020 United States census.

== Geography ==
According to the United States Census Bureau, the CDP has a total area of 8.6 km^{2} (3.3 mi^{2}), of which 8.6 km^{2} (3.3 mi^{2}) is land and 0.30% is water. Its population per square mile was 1,970.8 as of 2020.

== Demographics ==
Historical population
| Census | Pop. | Note | %± |
|---|---|---|---|
| 2020 | 6,474 | | — |
U.S. Decennial Census

At the 2020 census, there were 6,474 people and 2,514 households in the CDP. The racial makeup of the CDP was 84.1% White, 1.5% Black or African American, 0.0% Native American, 7.5% Asian, 0.0% Pacific Islander, and 5.1% from two or more races. Hispanic or Latino of any race were 5.5%.

The age distribution was 4.2% people under the age of 5, 21.5% under 18, 15.7% aged 65 and over, and 54% females.

The median household income in 2021 was $140, 482. The per capita income for the CDP was $74,924. About 2.4% of the people were in poverty.
