= Boston and Worcester =

The following companies have been known as Boston and Worcester, running between the towns of Boston and Worcester, Massachusetts:

- Boston and Worcester Railroad
- Boston and Worcester Street Railway
  - Its holding company, Boston and Worcester Electric Companies
- Boston and Worcester Turnpike
