= Calvin Coolidge Bridge =

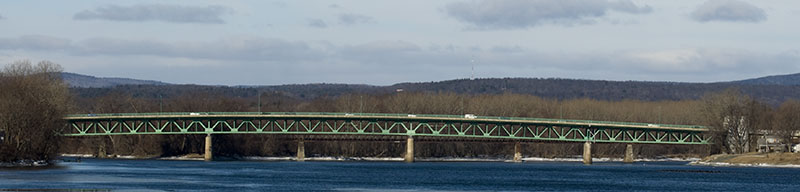
- Coordinates: 42°20′11″N 72°37′04″W
- Carries: Route 9
- Crosses: Connecticut River
- Locale: Northampton, Massachusetts to Hadley, Massachusetts
- Maintained by: Massachusetts Highway Department

Characteristics
- Design: Warren deck truss
- Total length: 1,440.94 ft (439.2 m)

History
- Construction start: 1936
- Opened: October 12, 1939

Statistics
- Daily traffic: 34,900

Location
- Interactive map of Calvin Coolidge Bridge

The Calvin Coolidge Memorial Bridge is a major crossing of the Connecticut River in Western Massachusetts, connecting the towns of Northampton and Hadley. The bridge carries Route 9 across the river, where it connects to Interstate 91.

== History and construction of the bridge ==
The Calvin Coolidge Memorial Bridge is a five-span, single intersection Warren deck truss bridge with distinctive design on its granite-faced abutment pylons. Art Deco ornamentation on the pylons includes carved eagles and incised carved lettering. The bridge, a replacement of a previous structure destroyed in the 1936 flood, was funded under the Hayden Cartwright Act, one of the numerous federal aid programs designed to provide construction jobs during the Great Depression. It was designed by W & L Engineering Co. in conjunction with Maurice A. Reidy as consultant and Desmond & Lord as architects. The bridge was built by T. Stuart & Sons.

The bridge was named as a memorial to President Calvin Coolidge (1872–1933), a longtime resident and former mayor of Northampton. Coolidge was elected to the State Senate and the governorship of Massachusetts before being elected President of the United States. A bronze memorial plaque of Calvin Coolidge is mounted on the northeast and southwest pylons.

The bridge features large, distinctive granite-faced pylons in the Art Deco style, measuring 15 by 27 feet at the base. On the northwest and southeast pylons are bronze doors that provide access to small rooms.

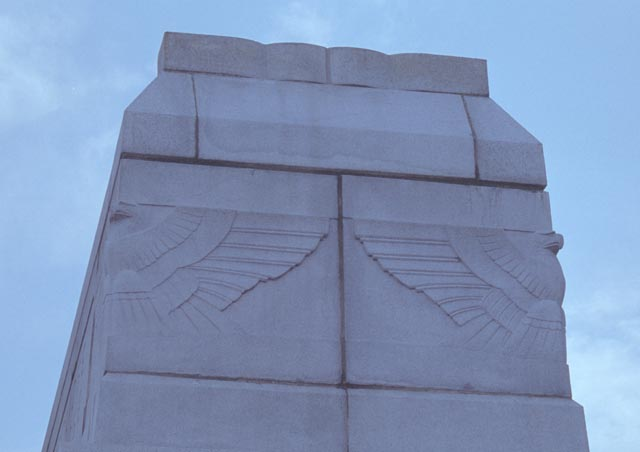
Art deco eagle detail

The 3 1/2-foot-high (1.1 m) welded steel Art Deco bridge rail is mounted at the back of the sidewalk on the north side of the bridge and on the bridge parapet on the south side where there is no sidewalk. It is a weathered green color. Integral to the rail are light standard posts supporting cobra head luminaires. The cobra head luminaires replaced the original low-pressure sodium lamp fixtures developed by General Electric. These lamps were based on a European model and introduced to the U.S. market in 1933. However, the yellow/orange, monochromatic light produced by the luminaire ultimately became unpopular with the motoring public, and use of the lamps was discontinued as color-corrected light sources became available.

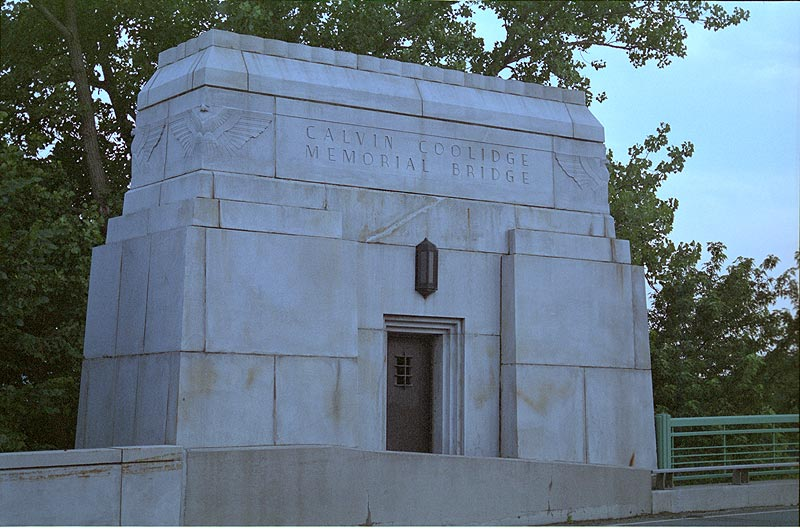
Southeast anchor of the bridge, with bronze door, showing art deco style

In 2001, the Massachusetts Highway Department began a major improvement of the Coolidge Bridge, that cost a total of $32 million which included:

- Widening the bridge from 3 lanes to 4 lanes, i.e., 2 travel lanes in each direction
- Replacement of the deteriorated bridge deck
- Refurbishing the historic Art Deco bridge railing and integrated light fixtures
- Cleaning and restoration of all granite facing
- Installation of a new 5-foot sidewalk on the north side of the bridge
- Repairing and improving the bridge approach roadways

In 2007 the Massachusetts Historical Commission determined that the Calvin Coolidge Bridge was not eligible for individual listing in the National Register of Historic Places but was eligible for listing as a contributing element in the (then) pending expansion of the Hadley Center Historic District. In 1994, the bridge was included as a contributing element to the Hadley Center Historic District.

The bridge is a bottleneck in Hampshire County, with Route 9 as the sole thoroughfare between the college towns of Northampton and Amherst. Because of this, a rotary was constructed on the Northampton side in winter of 2018–19 to ease traffic.

The road approaching the bridge is known as Bridge St. in Northampton (eastbound) and Russell St. in Hadley (westbound).

== See also ==
- List of crossings of the Connecticut River
