= Hopkinton (CDP), Massachusetts =

Hopkinton, Massachusetts
- Census-designated place
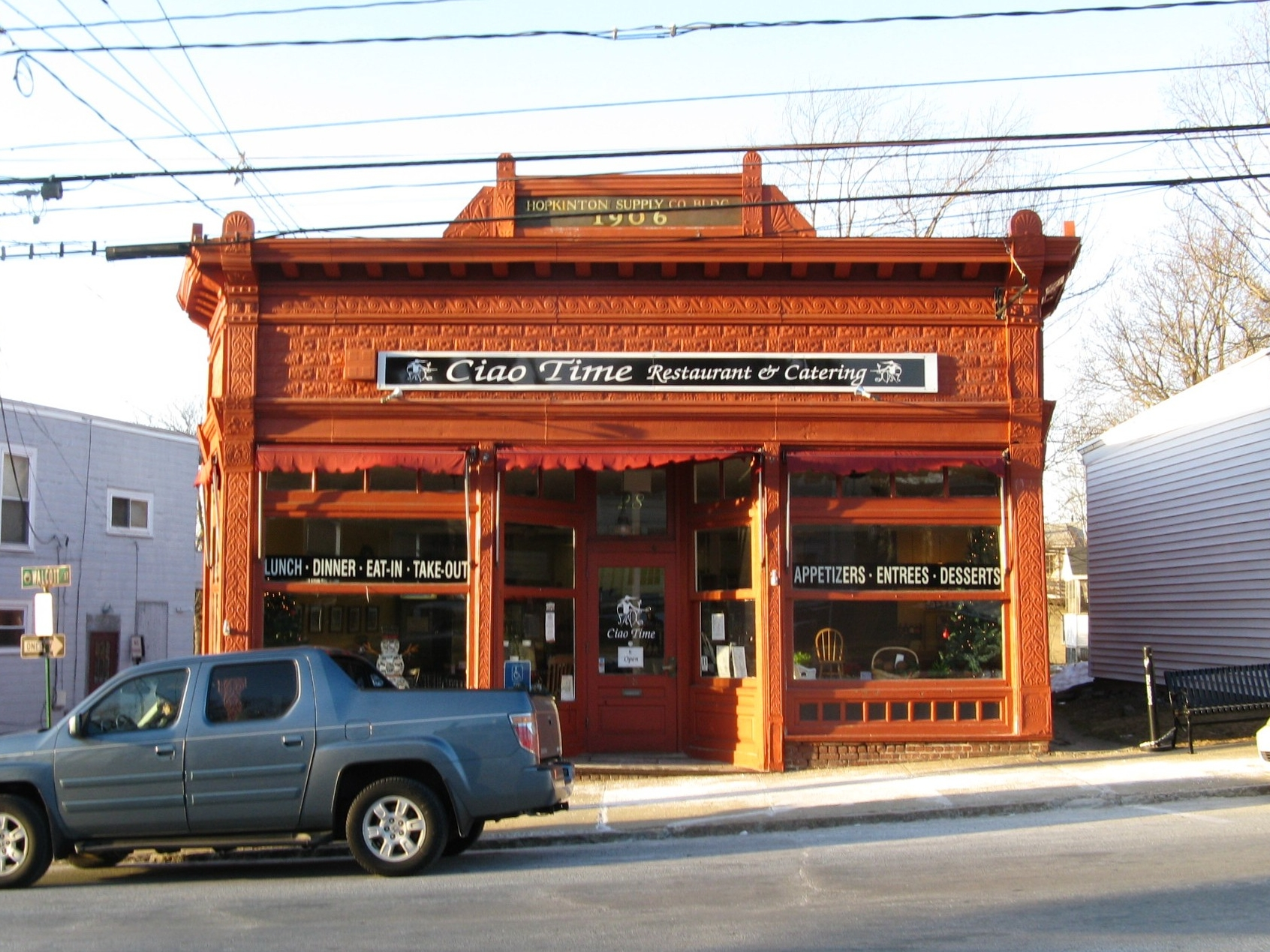
- Hopkinton Supply Co. Building

- Location in Middlesex County in Massachusetts
- Coordinates: 42°13′42″N 71°31′19″W
- Country: United States
- State: Massachusetts
- County: Middlesex
- Town: Hopkinton

Area
  - Total: 1.535 sq mi (3.98 km^{2})
  - Land: 1.532 sq mi (3.97 km^{2})
  - Water: 0.003 sq mi (0.0078 km^{2})
- Elevation: 443 ft (134.9 m)

Population (2020)
  - Total: 2,651
  - Density: 1,730.4/sq mi (668.1/km^{2})
- Time zone: UTC-5 (Eastern (EST))
  - Summer (DST): UTC-4 (EDT)
- ZIP Code: 01748
- Area code: 978
- FIPS code: 25-31050
- GNIS feature ID: 2378144

Hopkinton is a census-designated place (CDP) comprising the central village in the town of Hopkinton, Middlesex County, Massachusetts, United States. The population of the CDP was 2,651 at the 2020 census, out of 18,758 in the entire town.

== Geography ==
Hopkinton village is located in southwestern Middlesex County, at the center of the town of Hopkinton. Massachusetts Route 135 passes through the community as Main Street, leading northeastward 6 miles (10 km) to Framingham and northwest the same distance to Westborough. Massachusetts Route 85 runs through the village as Cedar Street and Grove Street, leading north 5 miles (8 km) to Southborough and south 6 miles (10 km) to Milford. Interstate 495 passes 1 mile (1.6 km) west of the village, with access from Route 30. I-495 leads north 9 miles (14 km) to Marlborough and southeast 12 miles (19 km) to Franklin.

According to the U.S. Census Bureau, the Hopkinton CDP has a total area of 1.54 square miles (3.99 km^{2}), of which 0.003 square miles (0.008 km^{2}), or 0.20%, are water. The village sits on a hill which drains north toward Indian Brook and east toward Cold Spring Brook, both tributaries of the Sudbury River, part of the Concord River watershed leading north to the Merrimack River.

== Demographics ==
Historical population
Census	Pop.	Note	%±
1950	1,829		—
1960	2,754		50.6%
1970	1,956		−29.0%
1980	2,542		30.0%
1990	2,305		−9.3%
2000	2,628		14.0%
2010	2,550		−3.0%
2020	2,651		4.0%
U.S. Decennial Census

As of the census of 2020, there were 2,651 people, 1,002 households, and 662 families residing in the CDP. The population density was 1,730.4 inhabitants per square mile (668.1/km^{2}). There were 1,058 housing units, 56 of which were recorded as vacant. The racial makeup of the CDP was 84.31% White, 1.32% Black or African American, 0.08% Native American, 5.36% Asian, 0.11% Pacific Islander, 1.92% some other race, and 6.90% from two or more races. Hispanic or Latino of any race were 5.09% of the population.

Of the 1,002 households in the CDP, 35.0% had children under the age of 18 living with them, 54.5% were married couples living together, 25.6% were a female householder with no spouse or partner present, and 15.2% were a male householder with no spouse or partner present. 25.2% of all households were made up of individuals, and 12.0% were someone living alone who was 65 years of age or older. The average household size was 2.50, and the average family size was 3.27.

In the CDP 21.1% of the population were under the age of 18, 7.7% were from 18 to 24, 20.5% from 25 to 44, 29.8% from 45 to 64, and 20.7% were 65 years of age or older. For every 100 females, there were 91.1 males. For every 100 females age 18 and over, there were 89.8 males.

As of the period 2017–2021, the median income for a household in the CDP was $149,677, and the median income for a family was over $250,000. The per capita income for the CDP was $99,714. About 2.4% of the population were below the poverty line, including 0.8% of those under age 18 and 10.8% of those age 65 or over.
