= Worcester and Shrewsbury Railroad =

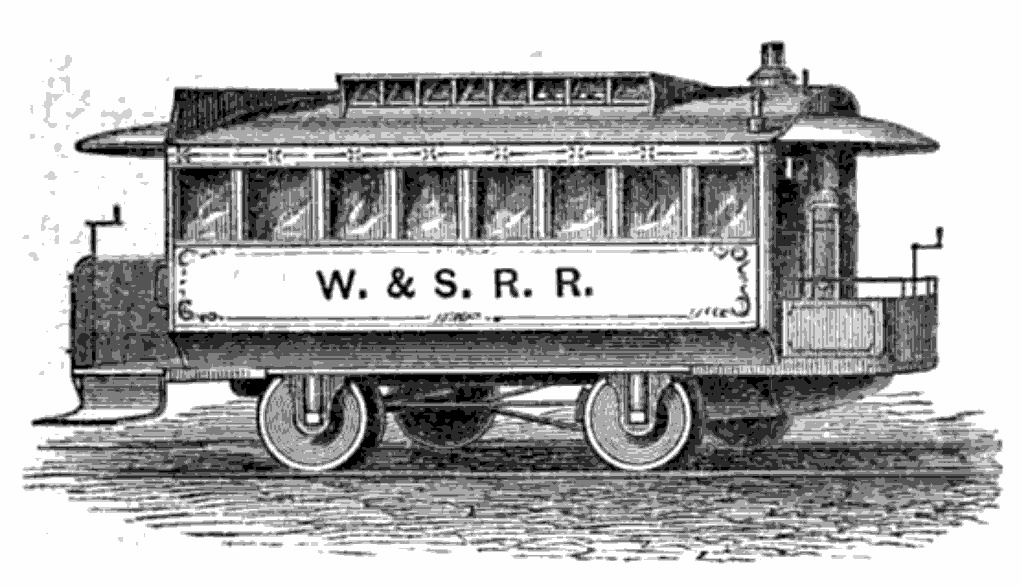
- Drawing of a Worcester and Shrewsbury steam dummy

Overview
- Status: Abandoned
- Locale: Worcester, Massachusetts

History
- Opened: July 31, 1873
- Converted to streetcar use: 1896–1900
- Closed: 1933

Technical
- Line length: 2.7 mi (4.3 km)
- Track gauge: 3 ft (914 mm) – 1873–1900; 1,435 mm (4 ft 8 1/2 in) – 1896–1933

The Worcester and Shrewsbury Railroad was a narrow gauge railroad line in eastern Worcester, Massachusetts, United States. It opened in 1873 and was converted to a standard-gauge streetcar line in 1896–1900.

== Route ==
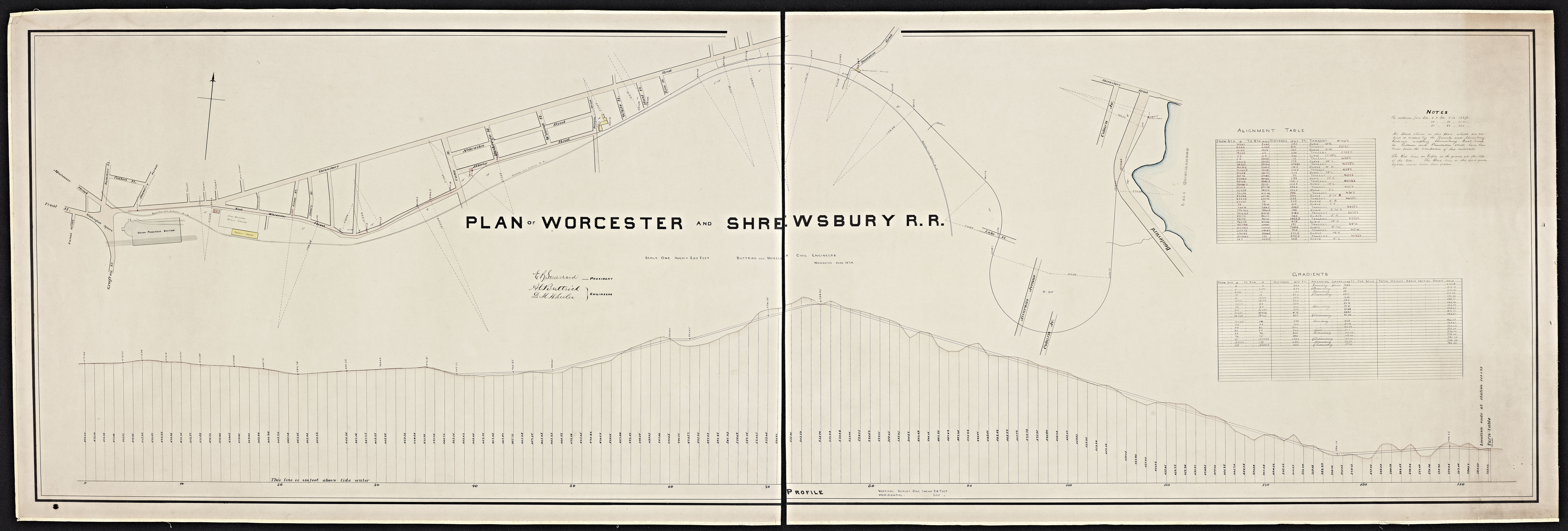
An 1874 map and profile of the railroad

The Worcester and Shrewsbury Railroad was 2.7 miles (4.3 km) long and ran entirely within the city of Worcester. It was originally built to 3 ft (914 mm) narrow gauge. The line's western terminal was near Washington Square, just north of where Union Station was built in 1875. It ran east and northeast along Shrewsbury Street, East Worcester Street, private right-of-way, and Albany Street. From Adams Street to Natick Street, it ran along the north side of the Boston and Albany Railroad (B&A) right-of-way. While the B&A ran in the aptly-named "Deep Cut", the W&S stayed at ground level above the B&A tracks. From there it ran southeast into the Lakeview neighborhood, then turned north to its Lincoln Park terminus on the western shore of Lake Quinsigamond near the Boston and Worcester Turnpike.

Along with the terminals, the railroad had intermediate stations at Drapers (at Drapers Street), Bloomingdale (at Plantation Street) and Lakeview (at Alvarado Avenue). A carhouse, roundhouse, and turntable were located near the eastern terminus. The line had a maximum grade of 3% – 160 feet per mile (30 m/km) – which was sustained for a full mile on the eastern half of the route.

== History ==
=== Railroad ===
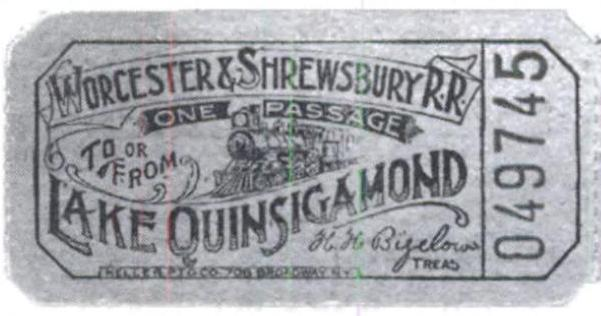
W&S ticket from the 1880s or 1890s

In 1872, the Massachusetts legislature permitted new railroads to be built to 3 ft (914 mm) gauge, which could be built with lower expense than standard gauge lines. The Worcester and Shrewsbury Railroad was chartered that year to transport passengers between downtown Worcester and Lake Quinsigamond, which was becoming a popular recreation and resort area. Construction began in May 1873. It opened as far east as Lake Signal (east of Bloomingdale) on July 31, 1873. The Worcester and Shrewsbury was the first narrow gauge railroad to open in Massachusetts. Beginning August 7, the railroad operated 20 daily round trips, with trains operating about every 45 minutes. Service over the full length of the line to Lake Quinsigamond began on August 28, 1873.

The line served primarily local passengers and ran a profit carrying excursion traffic to Lincoln Park on the lake shore. During the 1874 summer season, the railroad operated every half hour from 6 am to 9 am. Fare was ten cents. By 1877, the railroad was carrying 110,000–150,000 passengers annually. Local businessman Horace H. Bigelow purchased the line and several attractions on Lake Quinsigamond in 1883. By that time, the total cost to the original owners for the railroad and its rolling stock had been $60,048 (equivalent to $2,026,000 in 2024). Events at Lake Quinsigamond were used to promote ridership on the W&S. In August 1886, the company offered $500 to rower Ned Hanlan to break a single scull record. By 1890, the railroad was scheduled for 18 daily round trips in the winter and 22 in the summer, with additional trips operated most days.

The W&S was originally intended to continue east from Lake Quinsigamond into Shrewsbury. In 1875, the railroad conducted surveys for a 16 1/2-mile (26.6 km) extension past Shrewsbury to Marlborough via Northborough. None of the three towns had direct rail service to Worcester at that time. In 1882 and 1885, proposals to fund an extension were declined at Shrewsbury town meetings. In September 1887, the W&S tested an electric railcar over its line. Plans for an extension were revived in 1891; in June 1892, the legislature authorized the W&S to cross the Lake Quinsigamond causeway provided the line was completed to Marlborough within three years. By 1893, the railroad had plans to electrify its line along with building the Marlborough extension.

=== Streetcar conversion ===
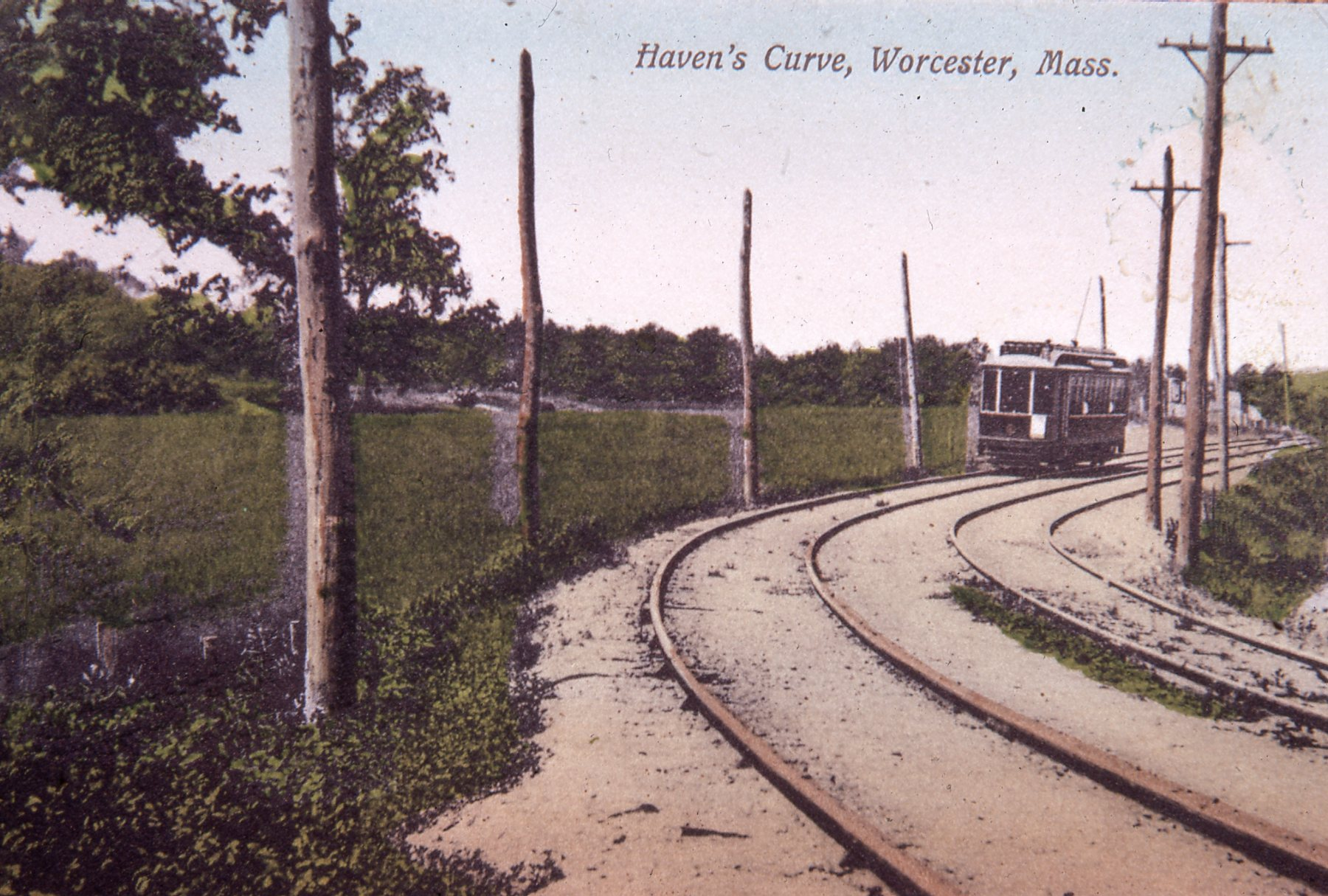
A Boston and Worcester Street Railway streetcar on the line in the early 20th century

The Worcester Consolidated Street Railway, which operated an extensive streetcar system in Worcester and surrounding towns, received permission from the state legislature in June 1896 to lease the W&S and the Worcester and Shrewsbury Street Railway (an unrelated streetcar company). The lease of the W&S took effect on July 1, 1896, with an annual rental of $3,750 (equivalent to $142,000 in 2024). In its final 12 months of independent operations, the line had carried 575,512 passengers and earned a net profit of $4,253 (equivalent to $161,000 in 2024). The Consolidated had also leased Lincoln Park by this time.

The Consolidated soon added an electrified standard gauge track on the north side of the W&S track between Bloomingdale and Lincoln Park. This track connected to the existing Consolidated streetcar line on Shrewsbury Street and Belmont Street near Liscomb Street and at Lincoln Park, forming a loop line known as the "Lake line" (also "Lake View line"). After the new streetcar track entered service, steam-powered service on the W&S track operated only intermittently, such when there was high ridership to the lake or events at the nearby Worcester Oval, or when the streetcar line was blocked. Despite this, eastward extension of the W&S was again considered in 1898. The "dummy" operated only a handful of times in 1899, and some equipment was sold off that year.

The Boston and Worcester Street Railway (B&W), an interurban line between its namesake cities, began operation on July 1, 1903. All B&W service initially used the Lake View line to enter and leave Worcester. The B&W introduced limited-stop service in 1909. By 1911, eastbound limited cars exited the city on the Shrewsbury/Belmont line, which saved four minutes compared to the longer Lake View line. Beginning on October 12, 1925, all B&W cars used the Shrewsbury/Belmont route.

The W&S and the Worcester and Shrewsbury Street Railway were consolidated into the Consolidated on March 29, 1929. The Lake View line was replaced with buses in 1933, ending rail service on the former Worcester and Shrewsbury.

== Rolling stock ==
The W&S began operation with a single 22-horsepower steam dummy locomotive and two passenger cars. The dummy and one car were made by E. Remington and Sons in Ilion, New York, at a cost of $3,500 (equivalent to $92,000 in 2024). The other car cost $500 (equivalent to $13,000 in 2024) and was made by J.M. Jones and Co. of West Troy, New York. The W&S was locally known as the "dummy" after the steam dummy. By 1875, the W&S owned three locomotives, four passenger cars, four cars for freight or other purposes, and one snowplow. At the time of its lease by the Consolidated, the W&S owned four locomotives, eleven passenger cars, and four freight cars. Some equipment, including one locomotive and two passenger cars, was sold to the Baltimore and Lehigh Railway in 1899.
