= Hockanum =

Hockanum can refer to some places in the United States:

== Place ==
- Hockanum (East Hartford), a neighborhood in East Hartford, Connecticut
- Hockanum River, a river of north central Connecticut
- Hockanum Rural Historic District, a historic district in the town of Hadley, Massachusetts
- Hockanum, an archaic name for the village of Higganum in the town of Haddam, Connecticut

== People ==
- Hockanum people, a historical tribe in present-day Connecticut
