= North Hadley Historic District =

Historic district in Massachusetts, United States

- U.S. National Register of Historic Places
- U.S. Historic district
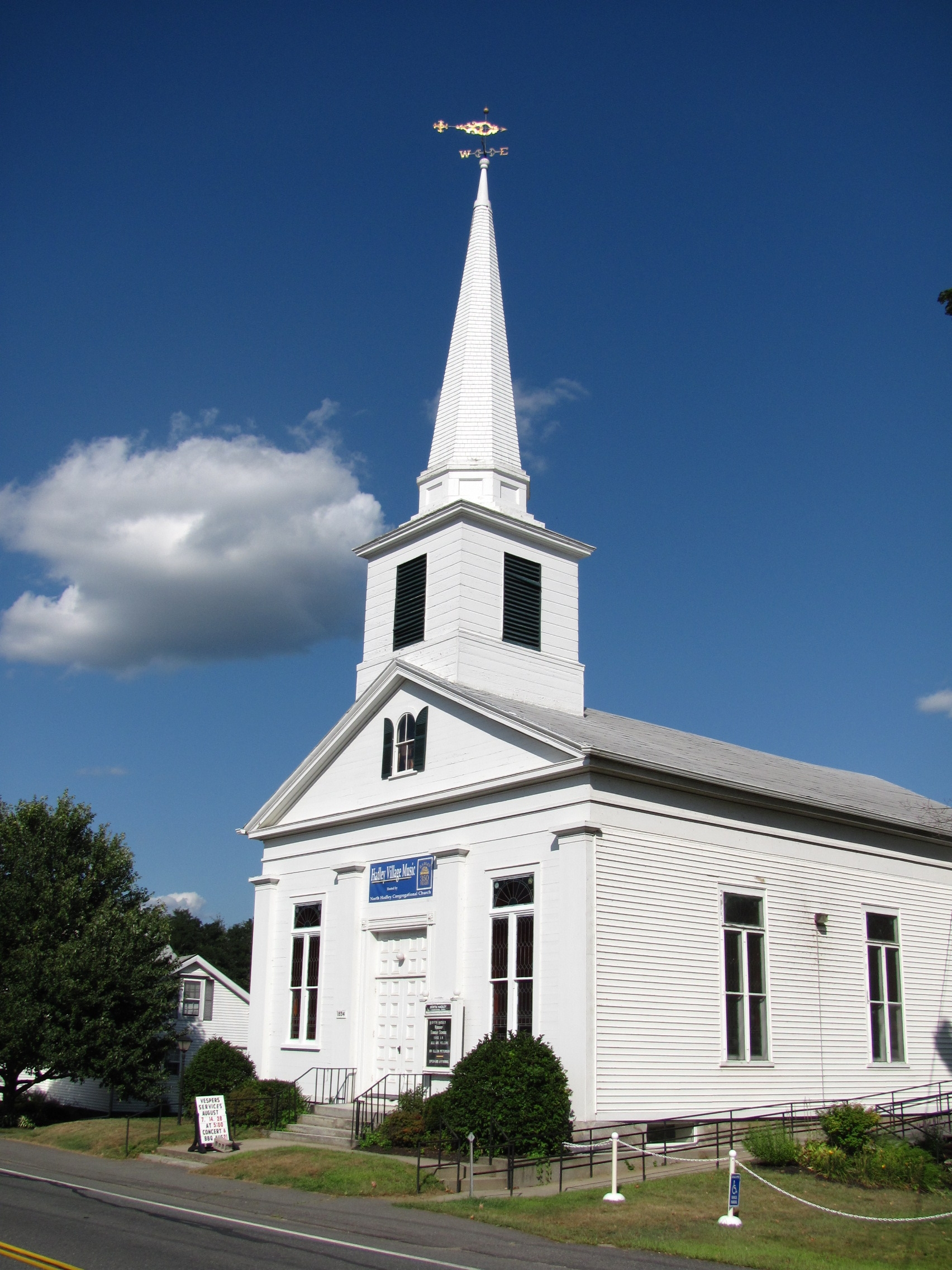
- North Hadley Congregational Church

- Location within Massachusetts Location within the United States
- Location: Roughly, area along River Dr. from Stockwell Rd. to Stockbridge St., including French, Meadow and Mt. Warner Sts., Hadley, Massachusetts
- Coordinates: 42°23′23″N 72°34′50″W
- Area: 605 acres (245 ha)
- Architect: Cutter, Elam; Osborn, John
- Architectural style: Federal, Greek Revival, Italianate
- NRHP reference No.: 93001475
- Added to NRHP: December 30, 1993

The North Hadley Historic District encompasses the historic rural village of North Hadley, located between Mount Warner and the Connecticut River in Hadley, Massachusetts. It includes properties on River Drive between Stockwell Road and Stockbridge Street, and includes properties on French, Meadow and Mt. Warner Streets. It is a well-preserved example of a rural farming and mill community, with architecture dating from the late 18th to early 20th centuries. The district was listed on the National Register of Historic Places in 1993.

== Description and history ==
Hadley was settled in the mid-17th century. The North Hadley area was at first used solely for agriculture, farmers traveling from their homes in the main village to work the land. A school (now Hopkins Academy) was established in the town, and was funded by rents on land given it in North Hadley. Permanent settlements began around 1675, with the establishment of a mill on the Mill River. The threads of agriculture and modest industrial activity powered the growth of a small village north of the Mill River.

The historic district covers an entire landscape of more than 600 acres (240 ha), bounded on the north by Stockbridge Street, the west by the Connecticut River, the east by the steep slopes of Mount Warner, and the south by Stockwell Road. The built portions of the area are mainly along River Drive (Massachusetts Route 47), where the village center stretches mainly to the north of the Mill River. The majority of the properties in the district are residential and agricultural; the notable exceptions are the c. 1834 Congregational Church, the 1795 cemetery, and North Hadley Hall, an 1868 building originally built as a schoolhouse. Construction dates for contributing properties to the district range from the 1780s to 1940, and a significant variety of architectural styles are represented.

== See also ==
- Hadley Center Historic District
- Hockanum Rural Historic District
- National Register of Historic Places listings in Hampshire County, Massachusetts
