= Hadley Center Historic District =

Historic district in Massachusetts, United States

- U.S. National Register of Historic Places
- U.S. Historic district
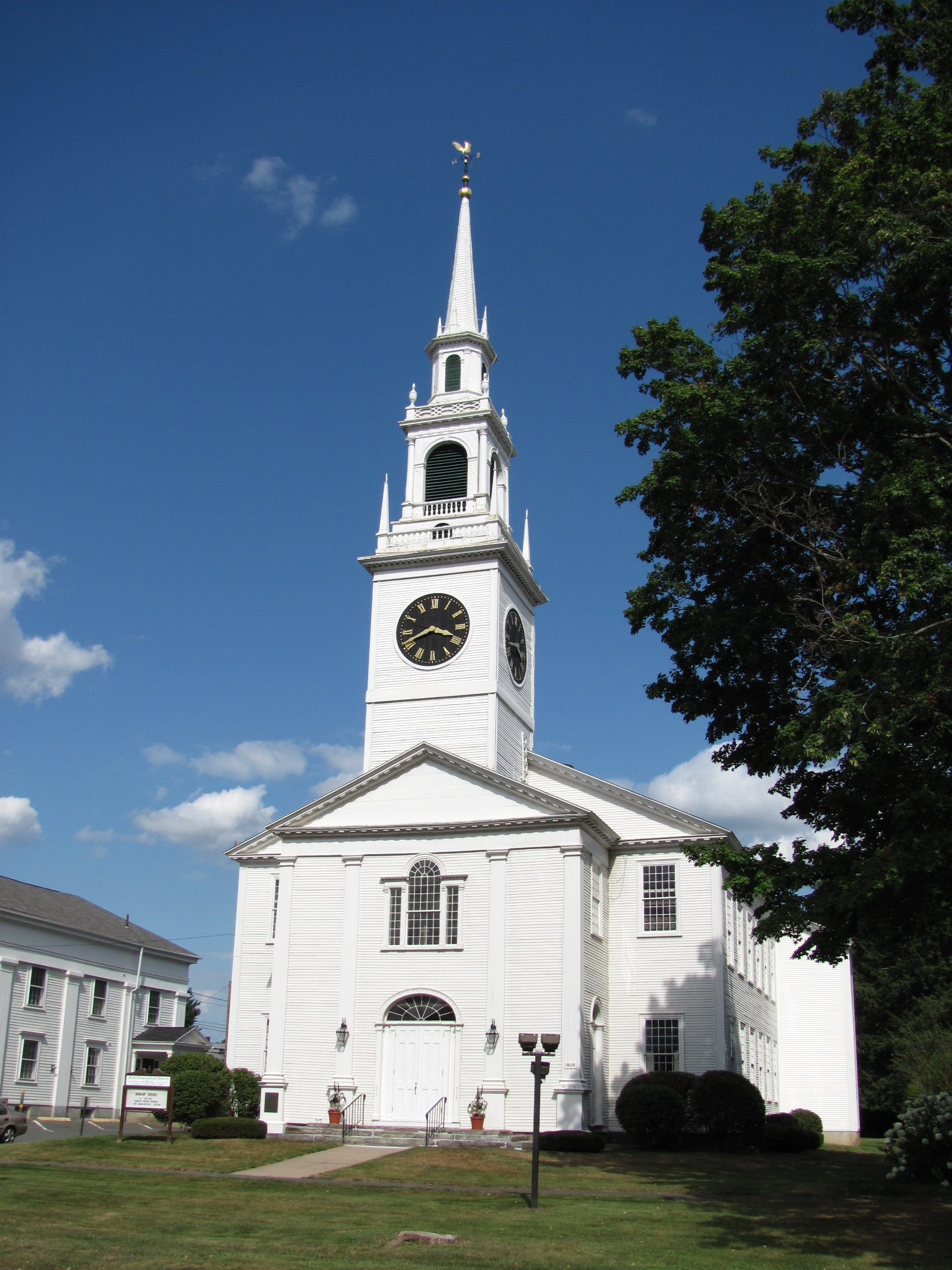
- First Congregational Church

- Location within Massachusetts Location within the United States
- Location: Hadley, Massachusetts
- Coordinates: 42°20′28″N 72°35′22″W
- Area: 15 acres (6.1 ha) (original); 2,500 acres (1,000 ha) (after increase)
- Built: 1775
- Architect: Multiple
- Architectural style: Mid 19th Century Revival, Early Republic, Colonial Revival
- NRHP reference No.: 77000185 (original); 88000513 (increase)

Significant dates
- Added to NRHP: December 2, 1977
- Boundary increase: January 14, 1994

The Hadley Center Historic District is an expansive, 2,500-acre (1,000 ha) historic district encompassing the village center of Hadley, Massachusetts. When it was first listed on the National Register of Historic Places in 1977, the district encompassed the town green and 17 buildings that faced it, at the junction of Russell Street (Massachusetts Route 9) and Middle Street (Massachusetts Route 47). The district was expanded significantly in 1994, adding more than 400 buildings representative of the village's growth from colonial days into the first decades of the 20th century. This expansion encompasses the entirety of a tongue of land extending west from East Street and bounded by a bend in the Connecticut River, which separates Hadley from Northampton. Its oldest property, the Samuel Porter House on West Street, was built in 1713.

Hadley was settled in 1659 and incorporated as a town in 1661. The land use patterns laid out at that time are still evident in the area surrounding the town center. The agricultural areas of the tongue of land in the Connecticut River floodplain were laid out in narrow strips, generally oriented north-south, which still dominate land ownership and usage patterns. Its major roads, including Russell, East, Middle, and West Streets, were laid out around this time, and were where houses and civic institutions were built. Bay Road, formerly a Native American trail, was the major road heading east from the river. The town grew slowly until the early 19th century, when it was joined to Northampton by a bridge over the Connecticut River. It remained agricultural, with a few cottage industries, with tobacco a major 19th-century crop before market gardens came to dominate in the early 20th century. The town center's architecture is reflective of its slow growth, with instances of architectural styles spanning more than three centuries.

== See also ==
- North Hadley Historic District
- Hockanum Rural Historic District
- National Register of Historic Places listings in Hampshire County, Massachusetts
