= Massachusetts Route 9 =

East-west state highway in Massachusetts, US

Route 9
- Kneeland Street; Worcester-Boston Turnpike; Ted Williams Highway; United Spanish War Veterans Highway
- Route 9 highlighted in red

Route information
- Maintained by MassDOT
- Length: 135.310 mi (217.760 km)
- Existed: by 1933–present

Major junctions
- West end: US 20 in Pittsfield
- US 7 in Pittsfield; I-91 / US 5 in Northampton; US 202 in Belchertown; I-290 in Worcester; US 20 in Northborough; I-495 in Westborough; I-90 / Mass Pike in Framingham; Route 16 in Wellesley; I-95 / Route 128 in Wellesley
- East end: Route 28 in Boston

Location
- Country: United States
- State: Massachusetts
- Counties: Berkshire, Hampshire, Worcester, Middlesex, Norfolk, Suffolk

Highway system
- Massachusetts State Highway System; Interstate; US; State
← Route 8A	→ Route C9

Route 9 is a 135.310-mile-long (217.760 km) major east–west state highway in Massachusetts, United States. Along with U.S. Route 20 (US 20), Route 2, and Interstate 90, Route 9 is one of the major east–west routes of Massachusetts. The western terminus is near the center of the city of Pittsfield. After winding through the small towns along the passes of the Berkshire Mountains, it crosses the college towns of the Pioneer Valley and then south of the Quabbin Reservoir and the rural areas of western Worcester County. Entering the city of Worcester from the southwestern corner of the city, it passes through the center of the city and forms the major commercial thoroughfare through the MetroWest suburbs of Boston, parallel to the Massachusetts Turnpike. Crossing the Route 128 freeway circling Boston, it passes through the inner suburbs of Newton and Brookline along Boylston Street, and enters Boston on Huntington Avenue, before reaching its eastern terminus at Copley Square.

== Route description ==
Route 9 passes through six counties and twenty-eight cities and towns.

=== Western end (Pittsfield–Worcester) ===
Route 9 begins in the western Massachusetts city of Pittsfield, at U.S. Route 20. After separating from US-20, it has a brief (.2 mile) concurrency with U.S. Route 7 through the center of that city, then continues east, passing through the towns of Dalton and Windsor, wherein the route reaches its highest point at 2033 ft, in Berkshire County. It continues its winding pass through the small towns of The Berkshires in Berkshire and western Hampshire Counties before passing through the center of Northampton, passing Smith College before its first interstate junction, at Interstate 91. It then crosses the Connecticut River at the Calvin Coolidge Bridge, just downstream from Elwell Island. It goes through the retail area of Hadley before passing the near University of Massachusetts Amherst and by Amherst College. From Amherst, it wends its way into western Worcester County, south of the Quabbin Reservoir, through small towns until it makes its way into the city of Worcester.

=== Through Worcester ===
Once in Worcester, Route 9 becomes a major thoroughfare through the city, as Park Avenue, Highland Street (which passes Major Taylor Boulevard), before passing over Interstate 290 and Belmont Street, where University of Massachusetts Medical School and the former Worcester State Hospital are located. At its intersection with McRae Ct., it becomes a divided highway with raised median, which it will retain until its terminus in Boston with the exception of a brief stretch in the Mission Hill neighborhood of Boston.

=== In the MetroWest region (Worcester–Wellesley) ===
From Worcester, it crosses Lake Quinsigamond into Shrewsbury. At this point, Route 9 becomes the main retail artery of the MetroWest region. Several plazas and chain stores are located along the route as it makes its way towards Northborough, where it crosses U.S. Route 20; Westborough, where it crosses Interstate 495; and eventually in the Golden Triangle retail area of Framingham and Natick, after crossing the Massachusetts Turnpike. It passes Shopper's World and the Natick Mall, New England's largest mall.

=== In Greater Boston (Wellesley–Brookline) ===
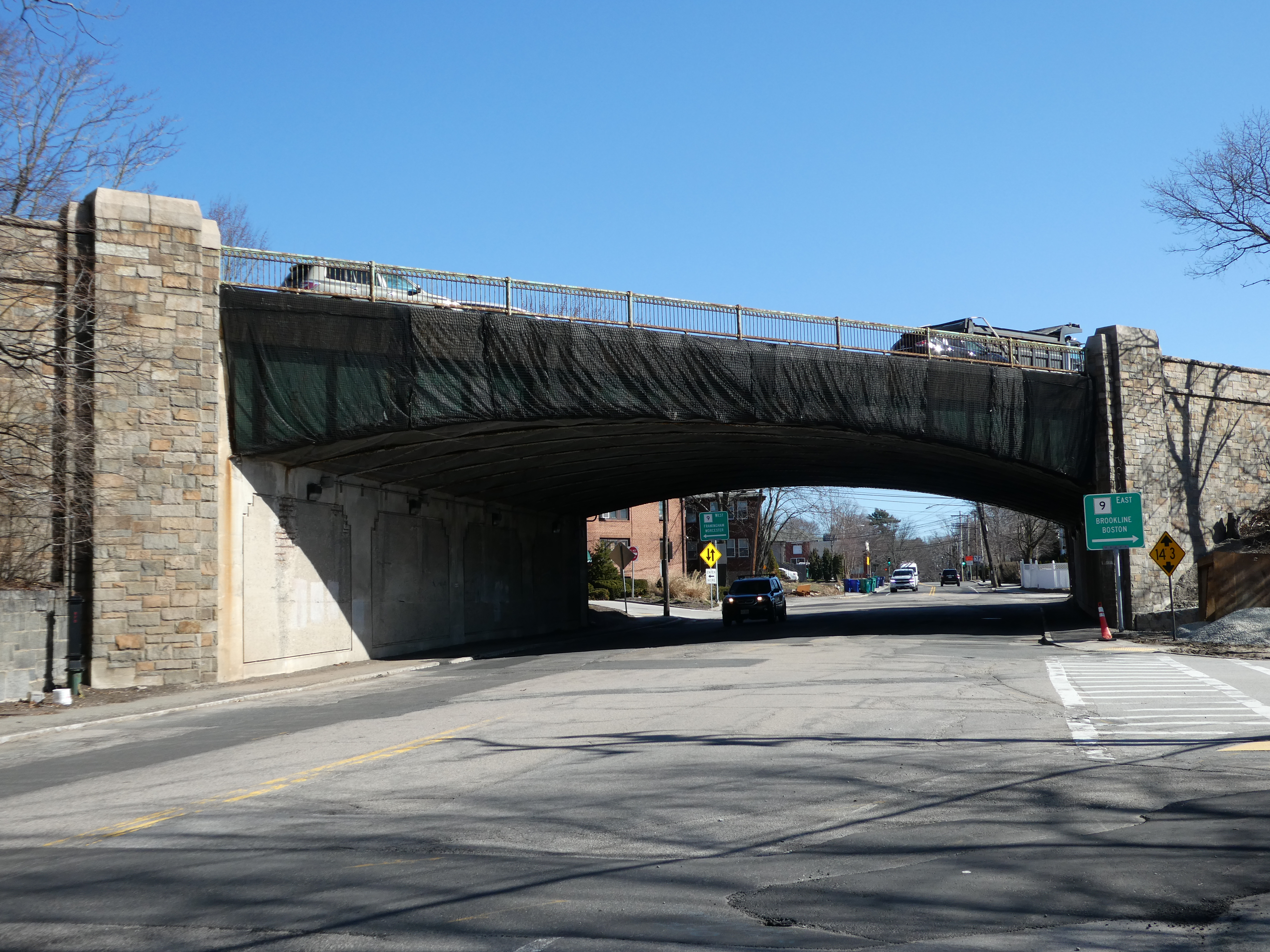
A bridge carrying Route 9 over Winchester St in Newton, Massachusetts

Beginning in the Golden Triangle, Route 9 becomes one of the major routes into Boston, serving as a valuable bypass to the Mass Pike and its tolls. It crosses Interstate 95 (also known as Massachusetts Route 128) in Wellesley before crossing the Charles River into Newton and Brookline, where it's also designated as Boylston Street. It enters the city of Boston by crossing over Brookline's former namesake, the Muddy River, part of the Emerald Necklace. At this point it briefly becomes Washington Street, then Huntington Avenue, also known as "Avenue of the Arts".

=== Eastern end in Boston ===
Route 9 loses its raised median briefly between its intersection with South Huntington Avenue and Brigham Circle. It passes the Longwood Medical and Academic Area, which includes Brigham and Women's Hospital, Harvard Medical School and other hospitals; the Museum of Fine Arts; and several colleges and universities, including Northeastern. This stretch is also a major site of baseball history; the first game of the 1903 World Series, baseball's first true World Series, was played at the Huntington Avenue Grounds, the original home of the Boston Red Sox. (The site is now part of Northeastern's campus.) The E branch of the MBTA Green Line roughly follows Huntington Avenue underground from Copley Square until it rises above ground at the Northeastern portal.

The Green Line E Branch then operates in a dedicated median of Huntington Avenue between Northeastern University and the Brigham Circle stop, where trains begin street running in mixed traffic to a terminus at Heath Street. Route 9 continues past Symphony Hall and The First Church of Christ, Scientist, which is the mother church of Christian Science. It then passes Copley Place and the Prudential Center complex, before splitting, the eastbound half onto Stuart Street, the westbound onto Saint James Avenue, past Copley Square; both the eastbound and westbound segments of Route 9 end at Route 28.

== History ==
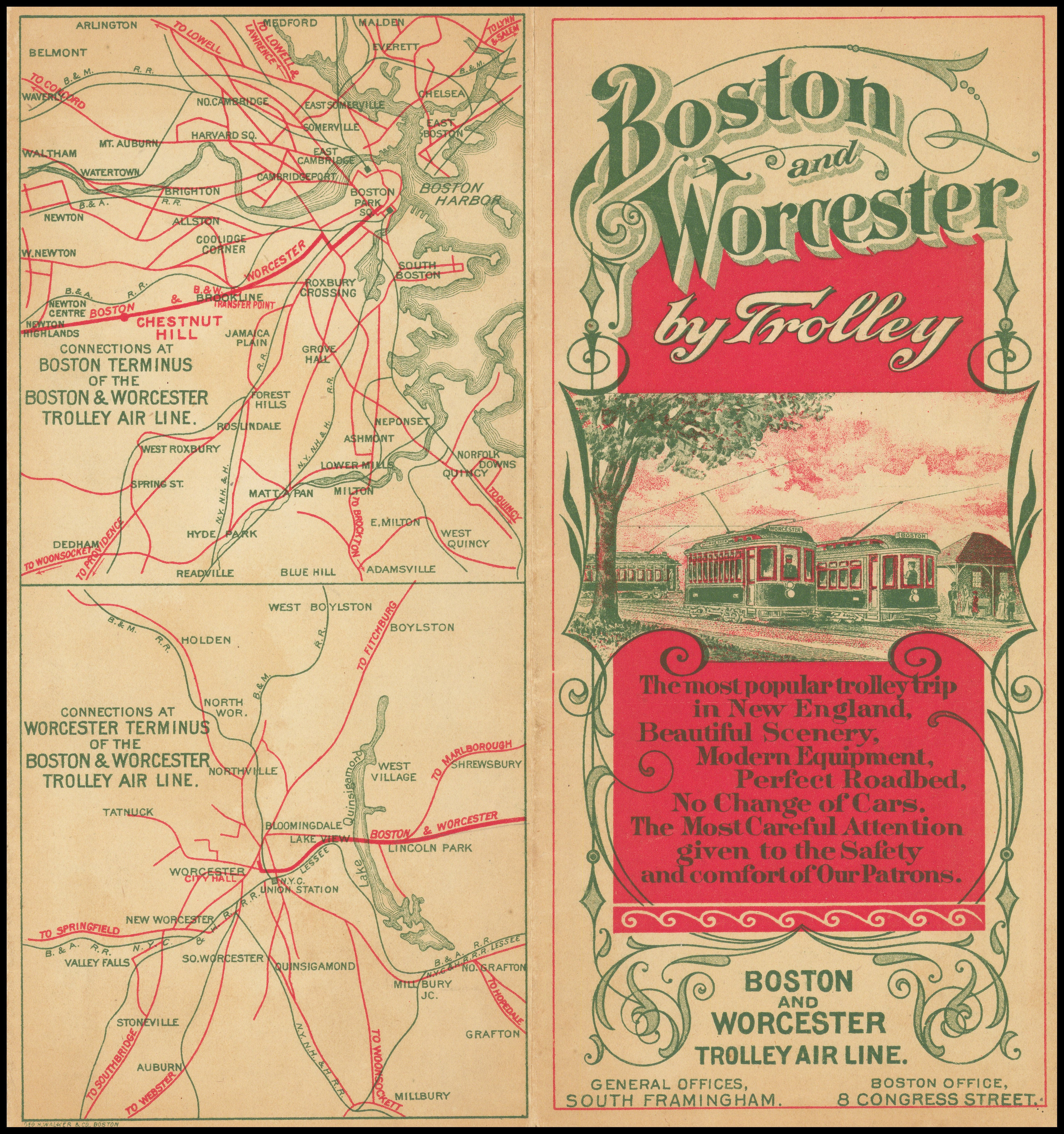
1904 postcard of the Boston and Worcester Street Railway

Route 9 was established in 1933. From its start in 1810 as a toll road from Brookline to Worcester, Route 9 has undergone transformation into a major highway due to the rise of the automobile, especially with the popularity of Henry Ford's Model T. It took over the alignment of what was Route 115 from Kenmore Square in Boston to Route 22 in North Grafton, part of the original route of US 20 between North Grafton and West Brookfield and the original Route 109 between West Brookfield and US 7 in Pittsfield. Route 9's original route in Boston was along Brookline Avenue from Kenmore Square turning west onto its current path along Boylston Street. Between Worcester and Boston, Route 9 follows the path of the 19th-century Worcester Turnpike, opened in 1810. This route originally included a floating bridge over Lake Quinsigamond in Shrewsbury. From Dalton to Goshen in the Berkshires, the road follows the old Berkshire Trail. The massive expansion of the University of Massachusetts Amherst transformed that part of Route 9 in the late 20th century; this otherwise rural part of the route now has several shops, restaurants, and the mid-sized Hampshire Mall. The section now called "Boylston Street" was so-named in 1841 to honor the prominent Ward Nicholas Boylston family, who at one time lived opposite the site of the present-day reservoir.

In the 20th century, Route 9 became the focus for urban sprawl in towns like Newton and Wellesley. Further west, in Framingham, Route 9 was home to Shopper's World, one of the first modern shopping malls.

In Natick, Route 9 is officially the "Ted Williams Highway", named after the Red Sox sports legend Ted Williams, who sported that number. In Newton, it is officially the "United Spanish War Veterans Highway".

From 1903 to 1932, the Boston and Worcester Street Railway ran mostly via modern Route 9. Today the E branch of the MBTA's Green Line follows Route 9 along Huntington Avenue.

== Safety ==
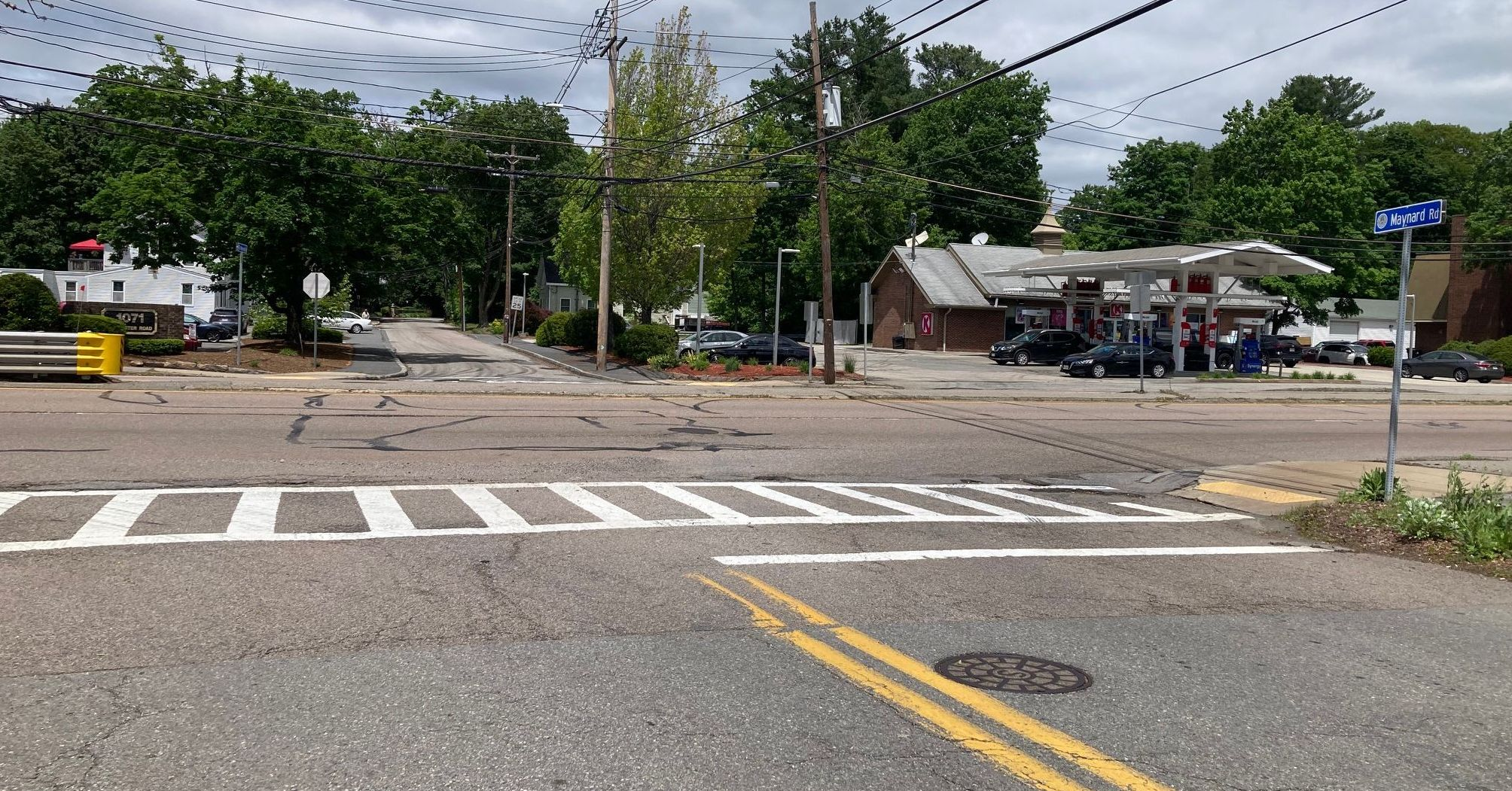
Route 9 at Maynard Road in Framingham, site of a 2012 pedestrian fatality

In 2012, while attempting to cross Route 9 in Framingham, a Framingham State University student was hit and killed by a driver. The incident prompted state transportation officials to initiate a road safety audit. In May 2020, MassDOT initiated a study of speed limit policies along Route 9.

A 2022 study by Boston Region Metropolitan Planning Organization of the Framingham/Natick section recommended striped crosswalks, traffic-calming and speed reduction measures such as uniform speed regulations and enforcement. A 2023 MassDOT study of the same section found that "Route 9, particularly around the Beetleback and Shoppers World Drive, is unsafe for pedestrians and bicyclists." It recommended changes to several intersections.

In 2022, a pedestrian was killed crossing Route 9 near California Avenue in Framingham. MassDOT made changes to the intersection later that year including a signalized crosswalk across Route 9. Pedestrians who walk near that location continue to have concerns about road safety.

== Major intersections ==
County	Location	mi	km	Destinations	Notes
Berkshire	Pittsfield	0.000	0.000	US 20 – Lenox, Richmond, Albany, NY	Western terminus
Berkshire	Pittsfield	0.388	0.624	US 7 south to US 20 east – Lenox, Lee	Western end of US 7 concurrency
Berkshire	Pittsfield	0.555	0.893	US 7 north – Lanesborough, Williamstown	Eastern end of US 7 concurrency
Berkshire	Pittsfield	3.592	5.781	Route 8 north – Cheshire, Adams	Western end of Route 8 concurrency
Berkshire	Dalton	5.959	9.590	Route 8 south – Hinsdale, Becket Route 8A begins	Eastern end of Route 8 concurrency; western terminus of Route 8A
Berkshire	Windsor	12.216	19.660	Route 8A north – Savoy	Eastern end of Route 8A concurrency
Hampshire	Cummington	21.874	35.203	Route 112 south – Worthington	Western end of Route 112 concurrency
Hampshire	Goshen	28.850	46.430	Route 112 north – Ashfield, Buckland	Eastern end of Route 112 concurrency
Hampshire	Williamsburg	34.138	54.940	Route 143 west – Chesterfield, Worthington	Eastern terminus of Route 143
Hampshire	Northampton	42.345	68.148	Route 66 west – Westhampton	Eastern terminus of Route 66
Hampshire	Northampton	42.380	68.204	Route 10 south – Easthampton, Westfield	Western end of Route 10 concurrency
Hampshire	Northampton	42.659	68.653	US 5 / Route 10 north – Holyoke, Springfield, Greenfield	Eastern end of Route 10 concurrency
Hampshire	Northampton	43.727	70.372	I-91 south – Holyoke, Springfield	Exit 25 on I-91 north
Hampshire	Connecticut River	44.040	70.876	Calvin Coolidge Bridge	
Hampshire	Hadley	45.597	73.381	Route 47 – South Hadley, Sunderland, Montague	
Hampshire	Hadley	48.355	77.820	Route 116 north – University of Massachusetts, Sunderland, South Deerfield	Western end of Route 116 concurrency
Hampshire	Amherst	49.774	80.103	Route 116 south – South Hadley, Holyoke	Eastern end of Route 116 concurrency
Hampshire	Belchertown	58.703	94.473	US 202 – Pelham, Athol, Belchertown Center	
Hampshire	Belchertown	59.631	95.967	Route 21 south – Ludlow, Springfield, Belchertown, Holyoke	Northern terminus of Route 21
Hampshire	Ware	68.966	110.990	Route 32 south – Palmer, Monson	Western end of Route 32 concurrency
Hampshire	Ware	70.565	113.563	Route 32 north – Gilbertville, Barre	Eastern end of Route 32 concurrency
Worcester	West Brookfield	74.790	120.363	Route 19 south / Route 67 south – Warren, Palmer	Northern terminus of Route 19; western terminus of Route 67 concurrency
Worcester	West Brookfield	75.888	122.130	Route 67 north – North Brookfield	Eastern end of Route 67 concurrency
Worcester	Brookfield	78.564– 78.596	126.437– 126.488	Route 148 – Fiskdale, Sturbridge, North Brookfield, Barre	
Worcester	Spencer	83.443	134.288	Route 49 south to US 20 – Sturbridge	Northern terminus of Route 49
Worcester	Spencer	85.004	136.801	Route 31 north – Paxton, Fitchburg	Western end of Route 31 concurrency
Worcester	Spencer	85.145	137.028	Route 31 south – Charlton, Dudley	Eastern end of Route 31 concurrency
Worcester	Leicester	90.004	144.847	Route 56 – Oxford, Paxton, Rutland	
Worcester	Worcester	94.286	151.739	Route 12 south – Auburn, Webster	Western end of Route 12 concurrency
Worcester	Worcester	95.465	153.636	Route 122 / Route 122A south – Millbury, Grafton, Paxton, Barre	Western end of Route 122A concurrency
Worcester	Worcester	96.114	154.680	Route 12 north / Route 122A north – West Boylston, Holden	Eastern end of Route 12/Route 122A concurrency
Worcester	Worcester	96.983	156.079	Route 70 north to I-290 east – Boylston, Clinton, Shrewsbury, Marlboro	Southern terminus of Route 70
Worcester	Worcester	97.229	156.475	I-290 west to I-395 south – Auburn, Norwich, CT	Exit 21 on I-290
Worcester	Lake Quinsigamond	99.298	159.805	Kenneth F. Burns Memorial Bridge	
Worcester	Shrewsbury	101.571	163.463	Route 140 – Shrewsbury, Grafton	Interchange
Worcester	Northborough	103.702	166.892	US 20 – Auburn, Northboro	Cloverleaf interchange
Worcester	Westborough	105.585	169.923	Route 135 – Westboro, Hopkinton, Northboro	Interchange
Worcester	Westborough	107.537	173.064	Route 30 – Westboro, Southboro, North Grafton	Interchange
Worcester	Westborough	108.116	173.996	Computer Drive / Research Drive	Interchange
Worcester	Westborough	109.070	175.531	I-495 to I-90 / Mass Pike – Cape Cod, Lowell	Exits 59A-B on I-495
Worcester	Southborough	111.121	178.832	Route 85 – Hopkinton, Milford, Southboro, Marlboro	Cloverleaf interchange
Middlesex	Framingham	112.949	181.774	To Route 30 – Worcester, Southboro	Interchange; access via Pleasant Street Connector
Middlesex	Framingham	113.759	183.077	I-90 / Mass Pike – Springfield, Boston	Exit 111 on I-90 / Mass Pike
Middlesex	Framingham	116.096	186.838	Route 30 west (Edgell Road) / Main Street – Framingham, Southborough	Interchange; western end of Route 30 concurrency; Route 30 not signed eastbound
Middlesex	Framingham	117.122	188.490	Route 30 east	Interchange; eastern end of Route 30 concurrency westbound
Middlesex	Framingham	117.441	189.003	Route 30 east / Route 126 – Framingham, Milford, Wayland, Weston	Interchange; eastern end of Route 30 concurrency eastbound
Middlesex	Framingham	118.097	190.059	Ring Road	Shoppers World entrance; eastbound left exit and westbound entrance
Middlesex	Natick	118.307	190.397	Shoppers World Drive	Shoppers World entrance; westbound exit and eastbound entrance
Middlesex	Natick	118.944	191.422	Speen Street to I-90 / Mass Pike / Route 30 – Natick	Interchange
Middlesex	Natick	119.957	193.052	Route 27 – Natick Center, Sherborn, Cochituate, Wayland, Concord	Cloverleaf interchange
Norfolk	Wellesley	122.360	196.919	Weston Road – Needham, Weston	Interchange
Norfolk	Wellesley	124.551	200.445	Route 16 – Wellesley Hills, Natick	Partial interchange
Norfolk	Wellesley	125.896	202.610	Cedar Street – Newton Lower Falls, West Newton, Needham, Dover	Interchange
Norfolk	Wellesley	126.545	203.654	I-95 / Route 128 – Canton, Providence, RI, Peabody, Portsmouth, NH	Exits 36A-B on I-95
Charles River		126.867	204.173	Bridge	
Middlesex	Newton	126.984	204.361	Chestnut Street – Upper Falls, Waban	Interchange
Middlesex	Newton	127.956	205.925	Centre Street – Needham, Dedham, Newton Centre	Interchange
Middlesex	Newton	128.609	206.976	Parker Street – Newton Centre, West Roxbury	Interchange
Middlesex	Newton	129.748	208.809	Hammond Pond Parkway – West Roxbury, Hyde Park	Interchange
Suffolk	Boston	132.936	213.940	Jamaicaway / Riverway – Dedham, Providence, RI	Interchange
Suffolk	Boston	134.599	216.616	Route 2A (Massachusetts Avenue) – Cambridge, Roxbury	Interchange
Suffolk	Boston	135.028	217.307	Exeter Street	Split of eastbound and westbound lanes into Stuart Avenue and Avenue of the Arts
Suffolk	Boston	135.055	217.350	I-90 west / Mass Pike west – New York	Eastbound exit and westbound entrance; exit 133 on I-90 / Mass Pike
Suffolk	Boston	135.310	217.760	Route 28 south (Clarendon Street)	Eastern terminus
1.000 mi = 1.609 km; 1.000 km = 0.621 mi: Concurrency terminus; Electronic toll collection; Incomplete access

== Gallery ==
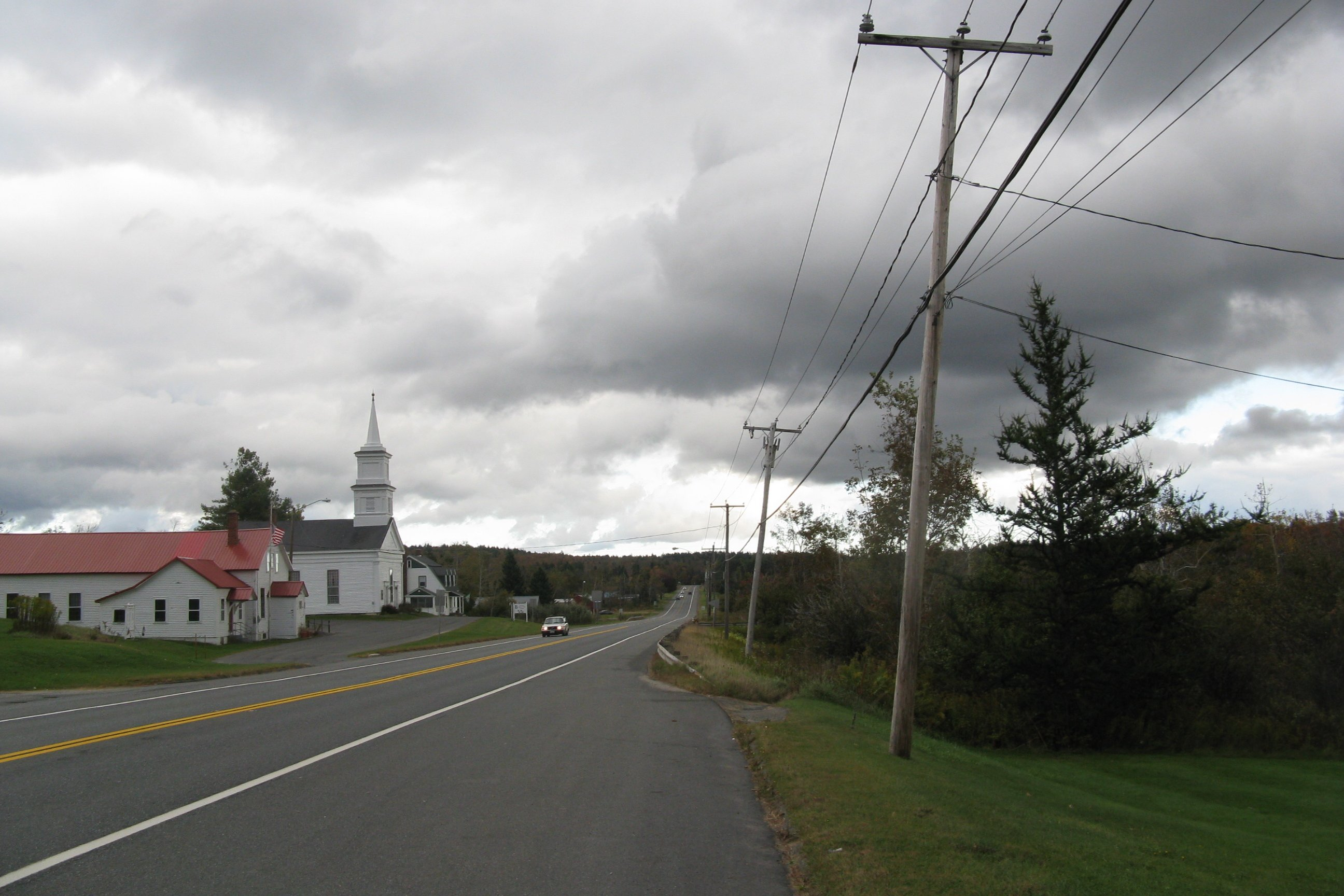
Eastbound in Windsor

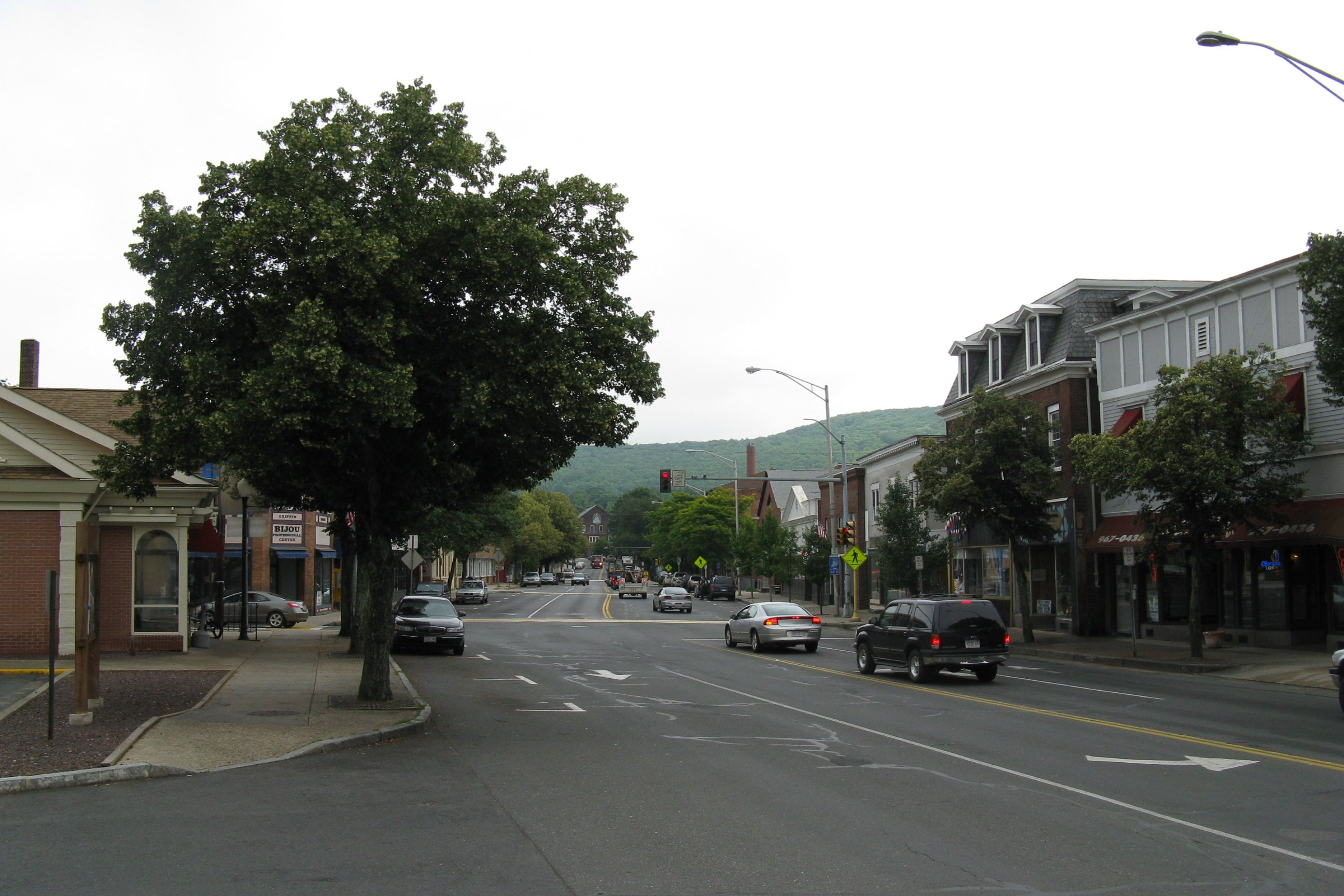
Downtown Ware

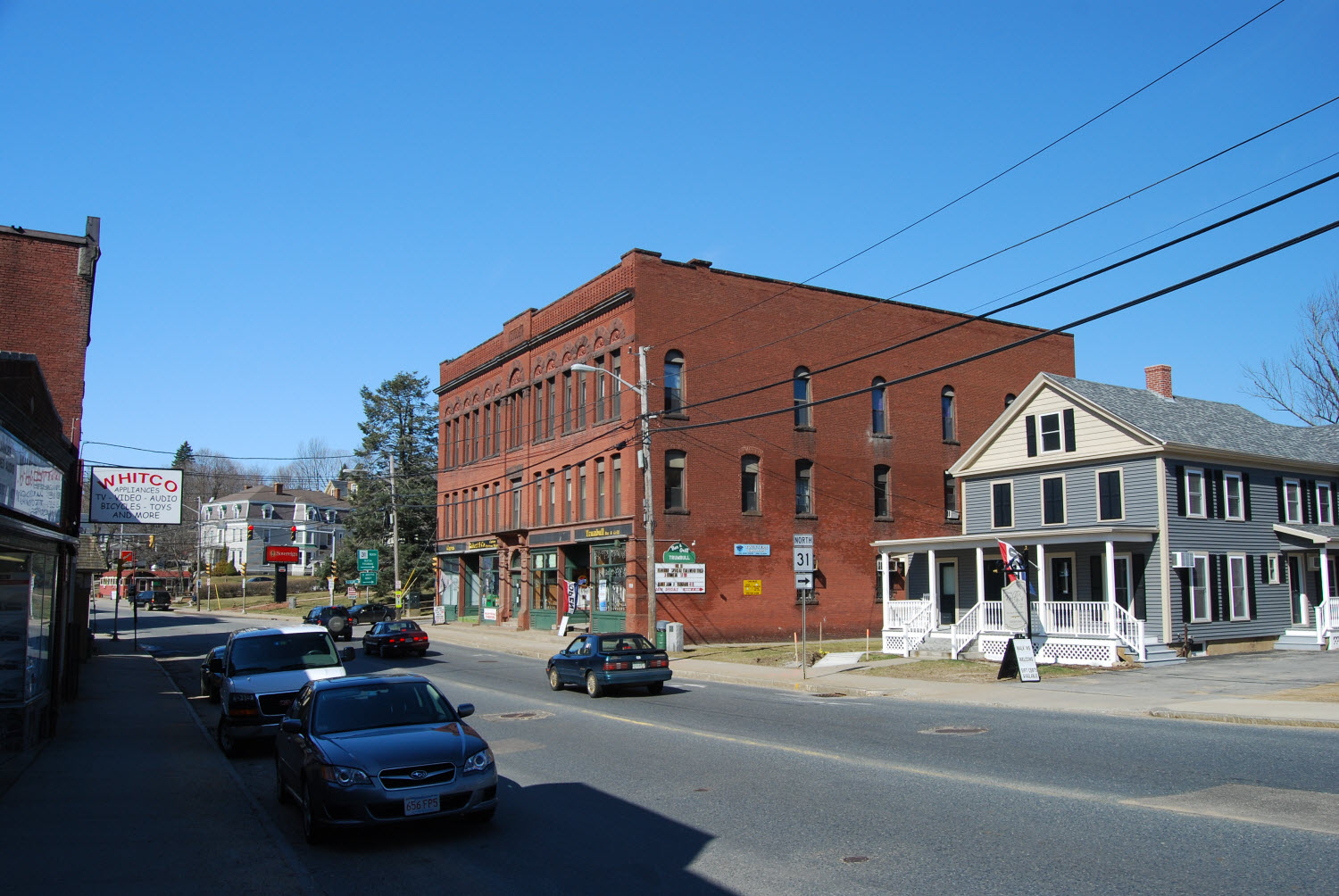
Downtown Spencer

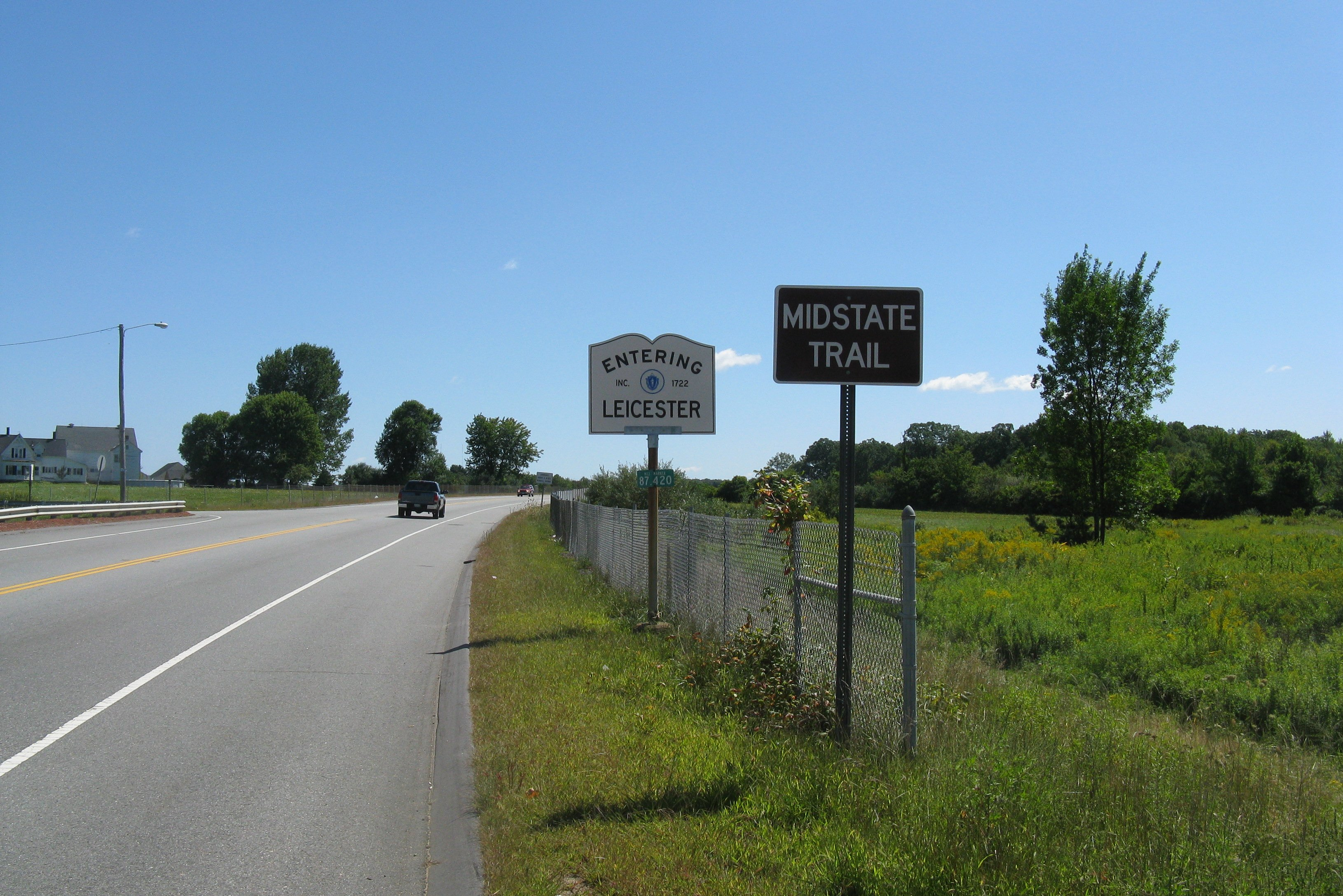
Eastbound entering Leicester

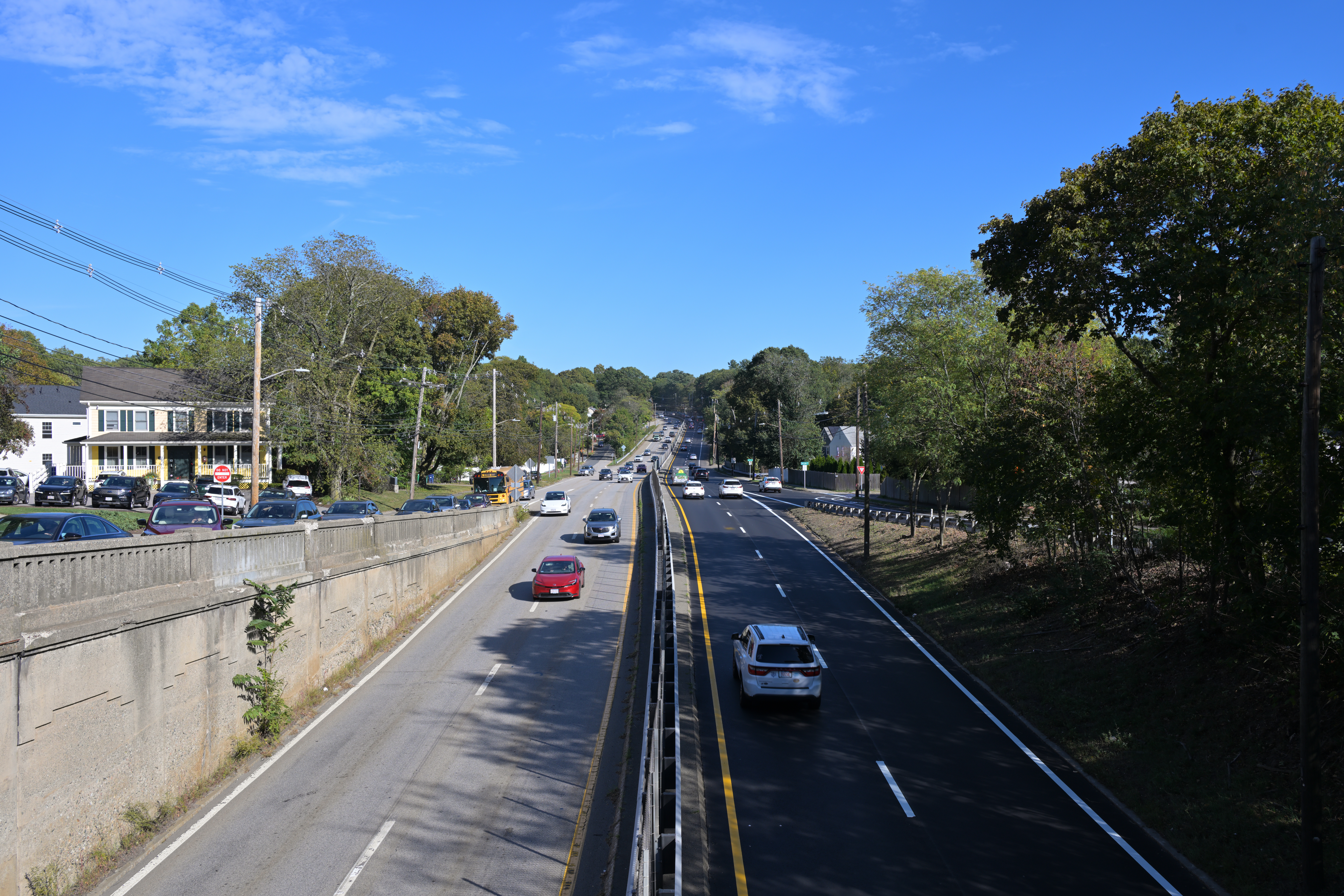
Newton

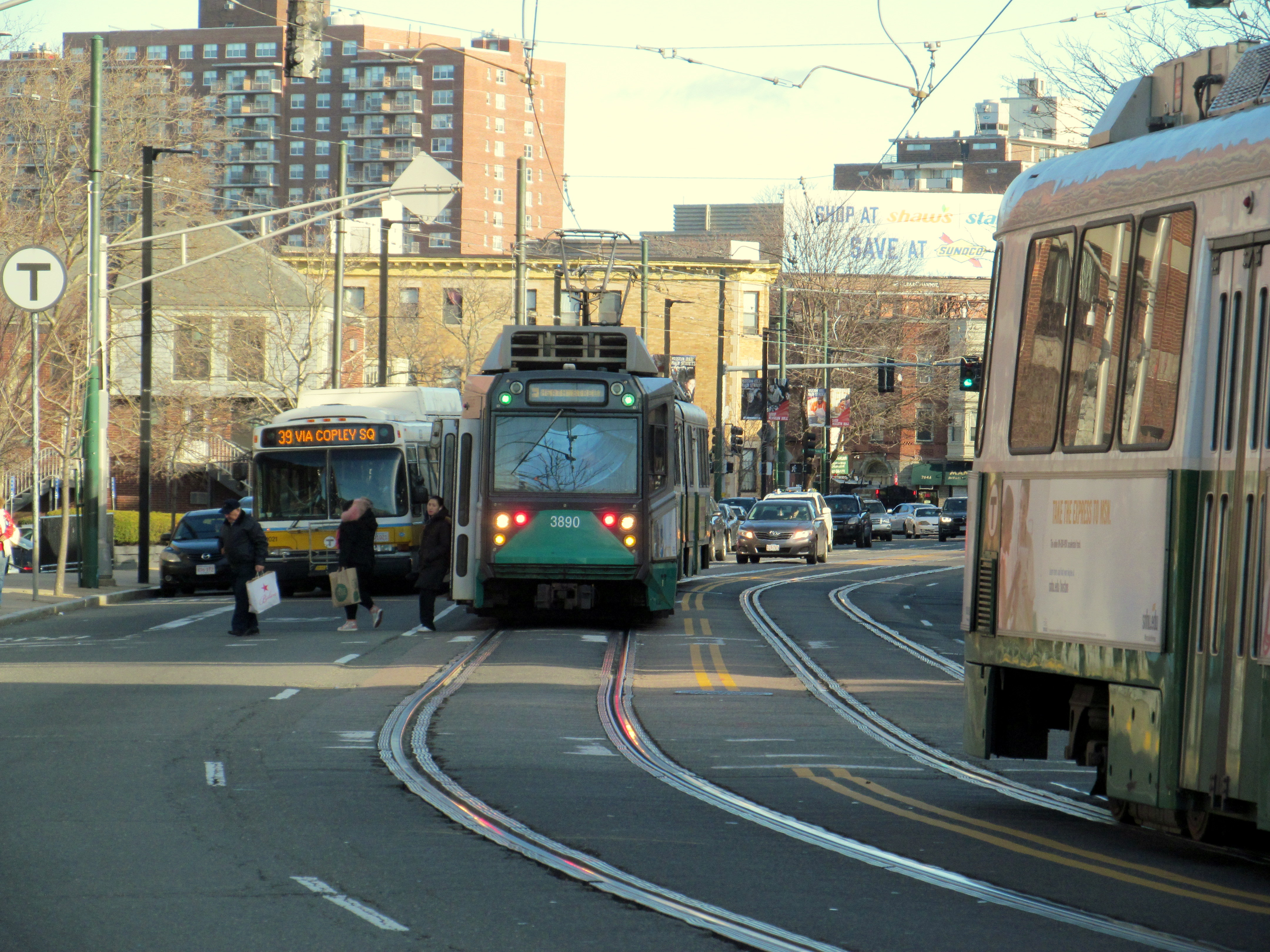
As Huntington Avenue in Mission Hill in Boston

== See also ==
- 19th-century turnpikes in Massachusetts
