= Hockanum Rural Historic District =

Historic district in Massachusetts, United States

- U.S. National Register of Historic Places
- U.S. Historic district
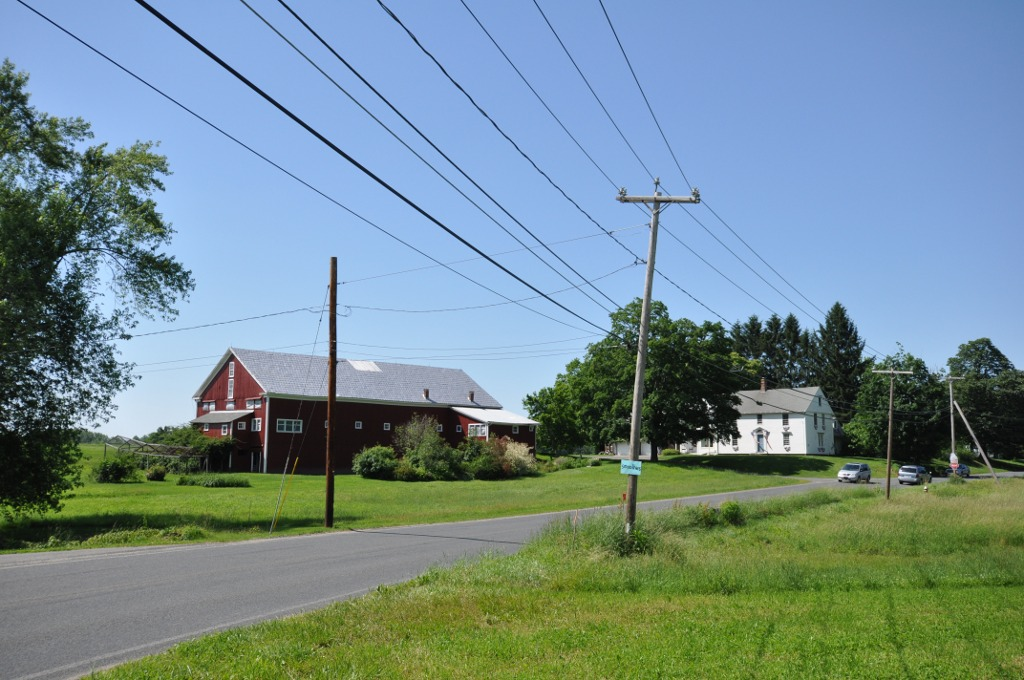
- A farm in Hockanum

- Location within Massachusetts Location within the United States
- Location: Hadley, Massachusetts
- Coordinates: 42°17′52″N 72°35′53″W
- Architect: French, John W.
- Architectural style: Greek Revival, Federal, Colonial
- NRHP reference No.: 93001474
- Added to NRHP: December 30, 1993

Hockanum Rural Historic District is a rural historic district along the Connecticut River in Hadley, Massachusetts. The district includes much of the area in Hadley west of Mount Holyoke and east of the river. Its formal boundaries run from Hockanum Cemetery in the southwest, following the river and the summit ridge of Mount Holyoke to the northeast corner of J.A. Skinner State Park. It includes the summit area of Mount Holyoke, including the Summit House, Halfway House, and other historic structures within the park, along with the agricultural lands of the valley below.

The views of the Connecticut River valley from Mount Holyoke were popularized in the early 19th century by the writing of Timothy Dwight, a Northampton native and president of Yale College. The summit area was a tourist destination, and artists such as Thomas Cole immortalized the views in art. In the late 19th century tourism waned, but saw a brief resurgence in the 1910s and 1920s due to the activities of Joseph Skinner, a local industrialist and philanthropist. He purchased and rehabilitated the mountaintop facilities and modernized the road to the summit. His success was brief, hurt by the Great Depression and the effects of the 1938 New England hurricane, which nearly destroyed the Summit House. He donated his holdings to the state to form the core of Skinner State Park.

The agricultural lands in the valley have undergone only relatively modest changes, and farming continues to be a dominant activity in the area. Most of the structures in the valley are related to agricultural activities. There is no church, but the community has historically been focused around taverns that were in the area, and more recently around the Hockanum School, a small brick schoolhouse built c. 1853.

The district was added to the National Register of Historic Places in 1993.

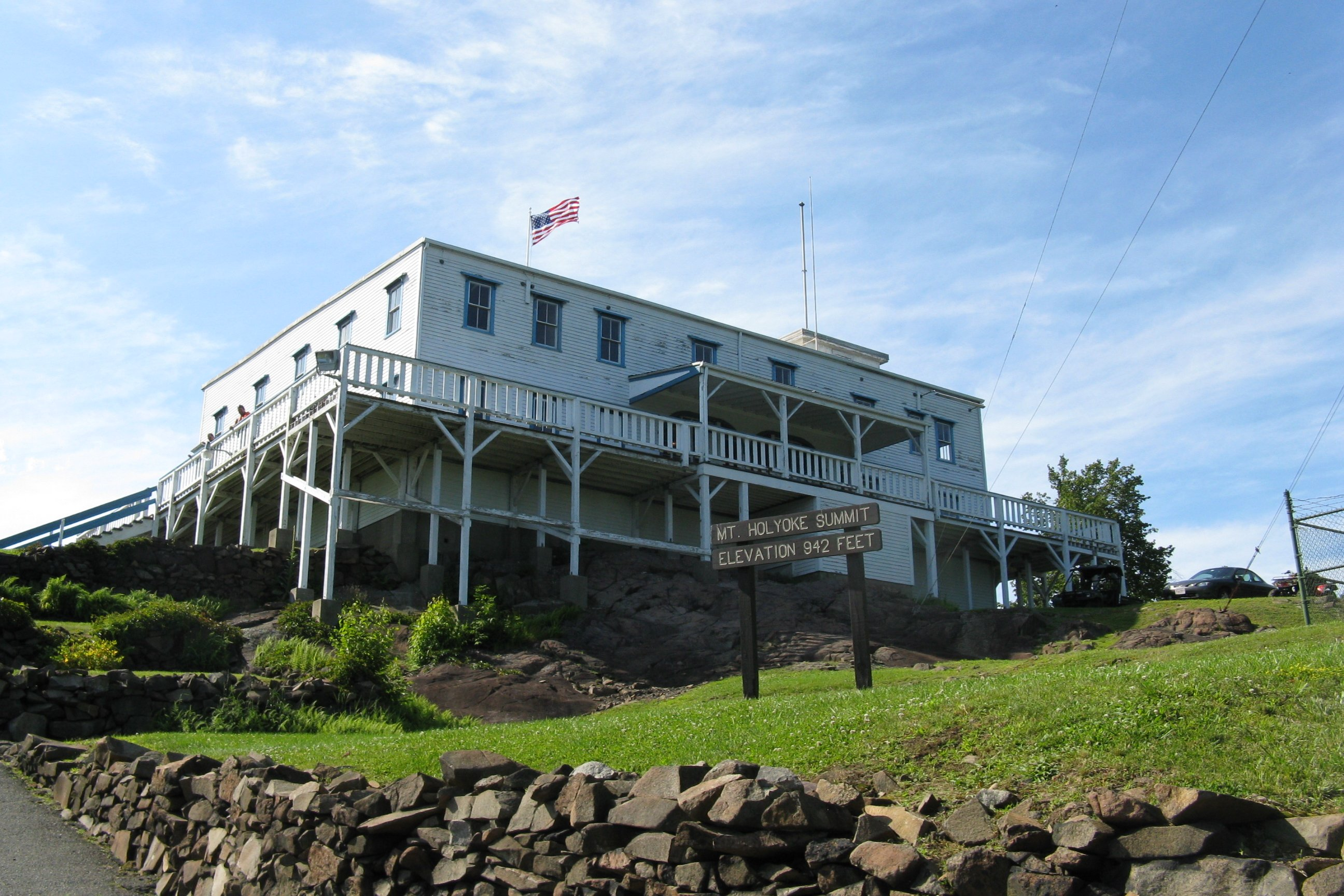
The Summit House on Mount Holyoke

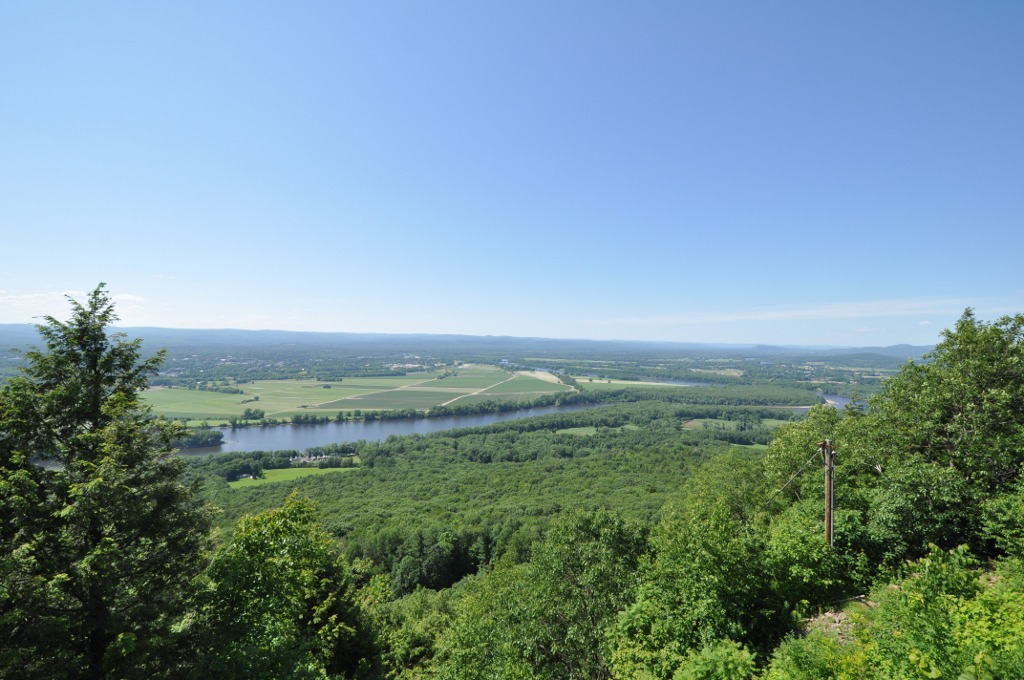
View from Mount Holyoke summit, looking northwest

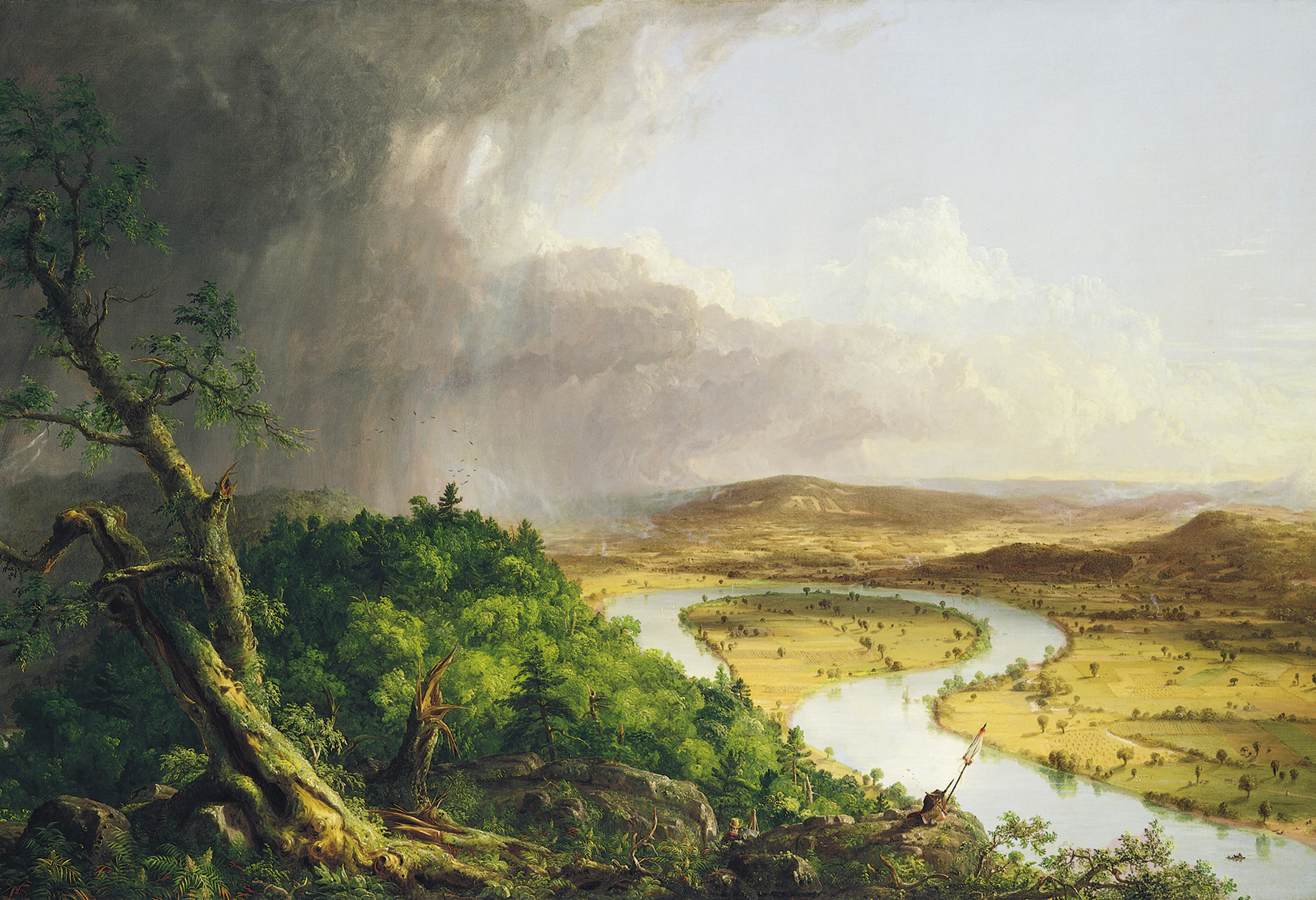
Thomas Cole's painting of the Connecticut River Oxbow, 1836

== See also ==
- North Hadley Historic District
- Hadley Center Historic District
- National Register of Historic Places listings in Hampshire County, Massachusetts
