= Boston and Worcester Street Railway =

Interurban streetcar in Massachusetts

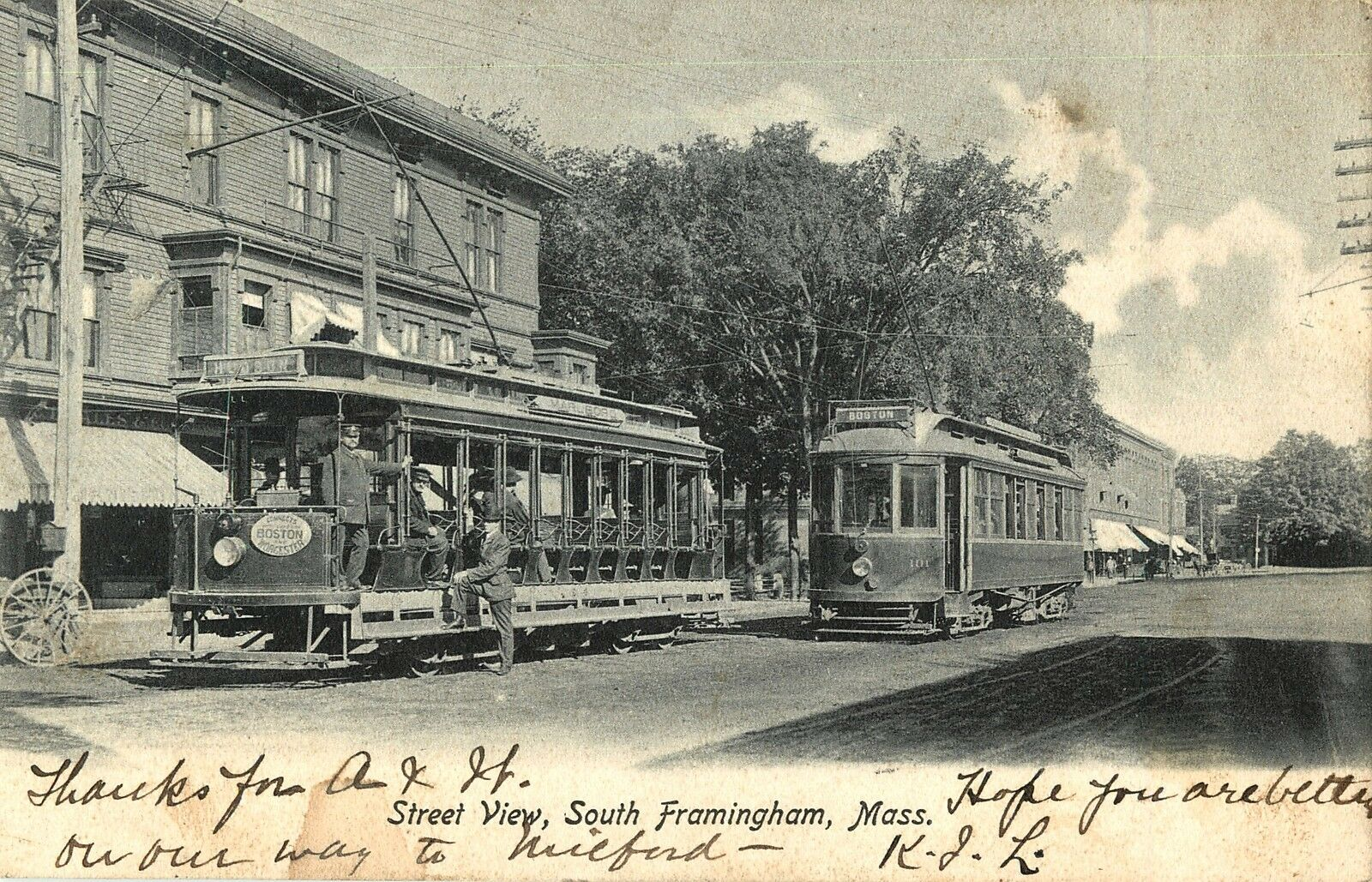
1900s postcard of two Boston and Worcester Street Railway streetcars in South Framingham. At left is an open car to Hudson via Marlborough; at right is a closed car to Boston.

Boston and Worcester Electric Companies (B&W) was a holding company for several streetcar companies between Boston and Worcester, Massachusetts. The main line, built by the Boston and Worcester Street Railway, was an interurban streetcar line partly on the old Boston and Worcester Turnpike (now Route 9) and partly on private right-of-way. Long after the line was converted to buses, Boston and Worcester Lines took over operations, and sold the franchises to various other bus companies.

In Newton, the B&W was granted a franchise in exchange for constructing a 90-foot (27 m) wide boulevard, of which it ran down the median. The B&W also carried freight.

== History ==
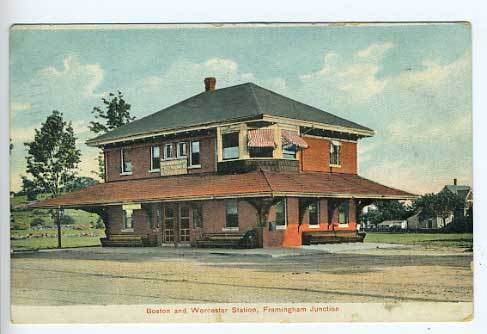
The B&W's Framingham Junction waiting room on an early postcard

The Boston and Worcester Street Railway was chartered November 16, 1901. Service between Boston and Framingham Junction began on May 5, 1903. (The line operated over the Boston Elevated Railway in Brookline and Boston; these trackage rights had been granted in December 1900 after a brief controversy.) Service between Worcester and Chestnut Hill began on July 1, 1903; Worcester–Boston service began five days later. Running time between the terminal was two hours and fifteen minutes; this was slower than Boston and Albany Railroad trains, but the B&W cost 40 cents versus the railroad's one-dollar fare. Service operated every half-hour, with short turn cars providing fifteen-minute frequency east of Framingham.

Boston and Worcester Electric Companies was incorporated December 29, 1902 to serve as a holding company. The B&W arranged control of several connecting roads in 1899 and purchased them in 1903–04:

- The Framingham Union Street Railway ran local service within Framingham. It operated a Framingham Center–South Framingham that connected to the B&W mainline at the former point, and a Saxonville–South Framingham line that intersected the B&W at Framingham Junction.
- The Framingham, Southborough and Marlborough Street Railway and its subsidiary Marlborough and Framingham Street Railway operated a line between Hudson and Framingham Center via Marlborough and Southborough. The B&W used this line between Fayville and Framingham Center.

The B&W opened a short branch to Natick Center in 1909.

In 1925–26, the B&W attempted to replace its entire service with buses, but was rebuffed by Brookline. However, the Framingham–Framingham Centre and Framingham Junction–Saxonville routes were replaced by buses on June 13, 1925. On July 3, 1926, the B&W began operating a Boston–Worcester bus line that followed the turnpike west of Shrewsbury, and the Post Road east of Northborough. The Hudson branch was replaced by buses in April 1928, followed by the Natick branch on October 15. Framingham Junction–Framingham service ended in September 1930. The line was cut back to Framingham on January 15, 1931, as paving of the turnpike progressed eastward, with buses replacing the western half. On June 11, 1932, the eastern half of the line was replaced with buses as well.

=== Rail trail ===
The Boston Worcester Air Line Trail is a proposed multi-use rail trail between Framingham and Worcester that would reuse much of the abandoned B&W right-of-way between Shrewsbury and Southborough. Planning for the trail was initiated by Shrewsbury, Westborough, and Northborough around 2013. Several portions of the right-of-way in Westborough are in use as existing trails, including between Lyman Street and East Main Street and within the Walkup and Robinson Memorial Reservation. A feasibility study for the Westborough section of the trail was released in 2021. In June 2023, the town was awarded $440,000 in state funds for design of the 1.7-mile (2.7 km) section between Otis Street and Park Street. Not on the former B&W alignment, this section would connect the trail with Westborough station.

== Routes ==
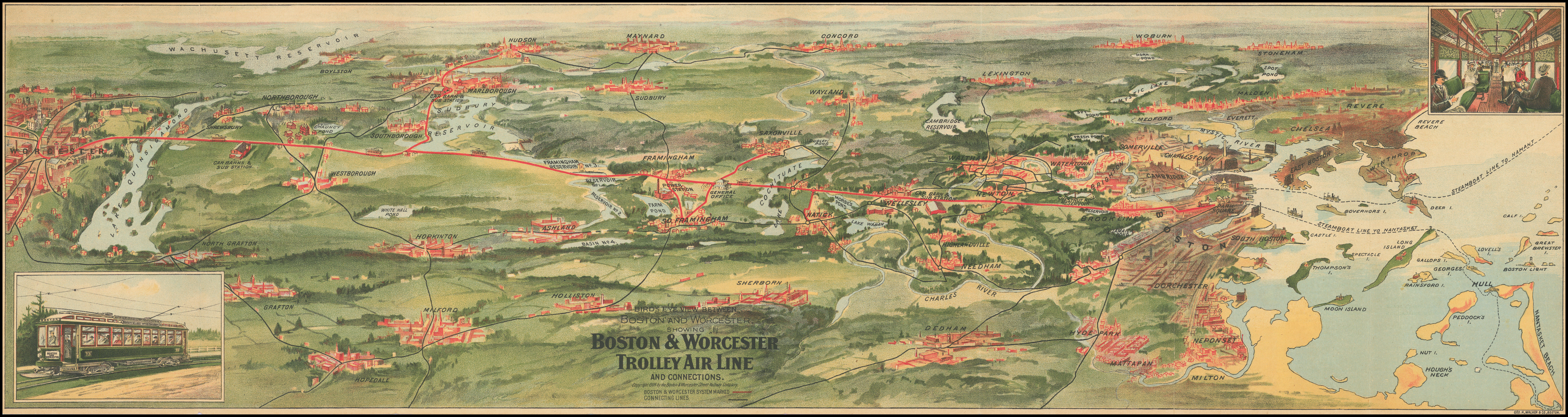
1904 map of the Boston and Worcester Street Railway

=== Main line ===
The main line ran along the old Boston and Worcester Turnpike (now Route 9) for most of its length. It used tracks of the Worcester Consolidated Street Railway between the City Hall terminal and Lake Junction in Shrewsbury (slightly east of the Lake Quinsigamond causeway). Service initially used the Consolidated's Lake View line (the former Worcester and Shrewsbury Railroad), which ran partially on private right-of-way west of the lake. Around 1911, some limited service began using a different Consolidated line on Shrewsbury Street and Belmont Street; all service began using that route in 1925.

Between Lake Junction and Whites Corner in Southborough, the B&W used a private right-of-way roughly paralleling the Turnpike. East of Whites Corner, it followed the turnpike to Chestnut Hill on the Newton/Brookline border. It used Boston Elevated Railway (BERy) tracks along the turnpike and Huntington Avenue into Boston. For most of its history, the B&W used BERy tracks on Massachusetts Avenue and Columbus Avenue to reach its eastern terminal at Park Square in Boston. In the late 1920s, the BERY abandoned most of its Columbus Avenue tracks; B&W cars instead continued on Huntington Avenue to Copley Square, then followed Boylston Street, Berkeley Street, and Columbus Avenue to Park Square.

=== Branches ===
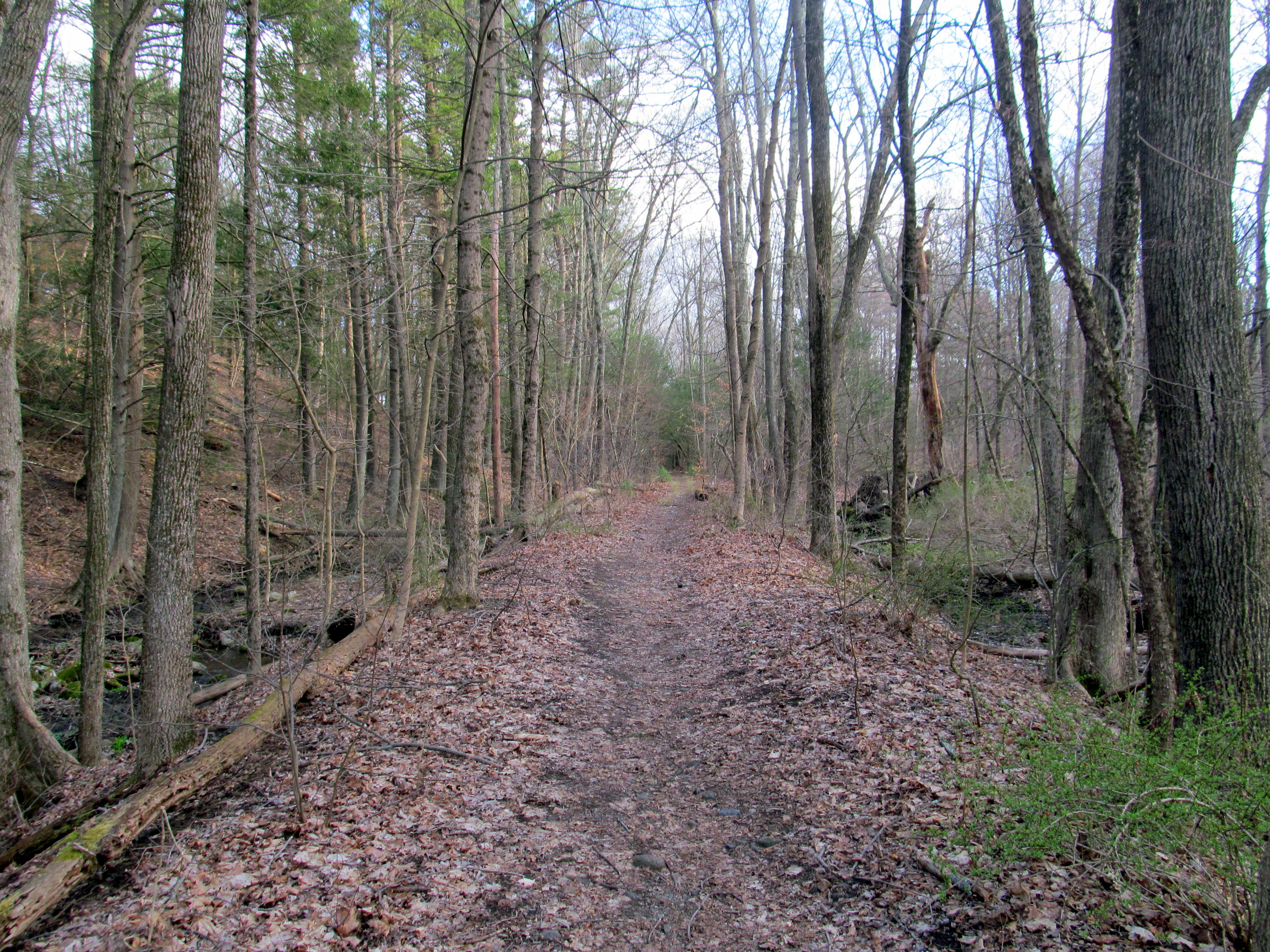
Former right-of-way of the branch to Natick, photographed in 2016

The B&W also operated several branch line services. The Natick branch split from the main line at Natick Junction, east of Walnut Street. It followed a private right-of-way to Highland Street, then ran on Middle Street, Sawin Street, North Avenue, Washington Street, and Park Street to Natick Common in downtown Natick, Massachusetts. Service ran between Natick Common and Chestnut Hill from 1908 to around 1917, with some through service to Park Square in the mid-1910s. From around 1917 to 1928, it operated as a shuttle service between Natick Common and Natick Junction.

Tracks ran between South Framingham and the main line at Framingham Center via Union Avenue and Main Street, and between South Framingham and Saxonville via Concord Street (intersecting the main line at Framingham Junction). Local service ran on both these lines, and South Framingham–Boston service used the Saxonville line between South Framingham and Framingham Junction.

A long branch ran between Whites Corner and Hudson via Southborough and Marlborough. Hudson service ran to Whites Corner, South Framingham, Chestnut Hill, and Park Square at various times. A short crosstown line also ran within Marlborough.
