= Westborough (CDP), Massachusetts =

Westborough, Massachusetts
- Census-designated place
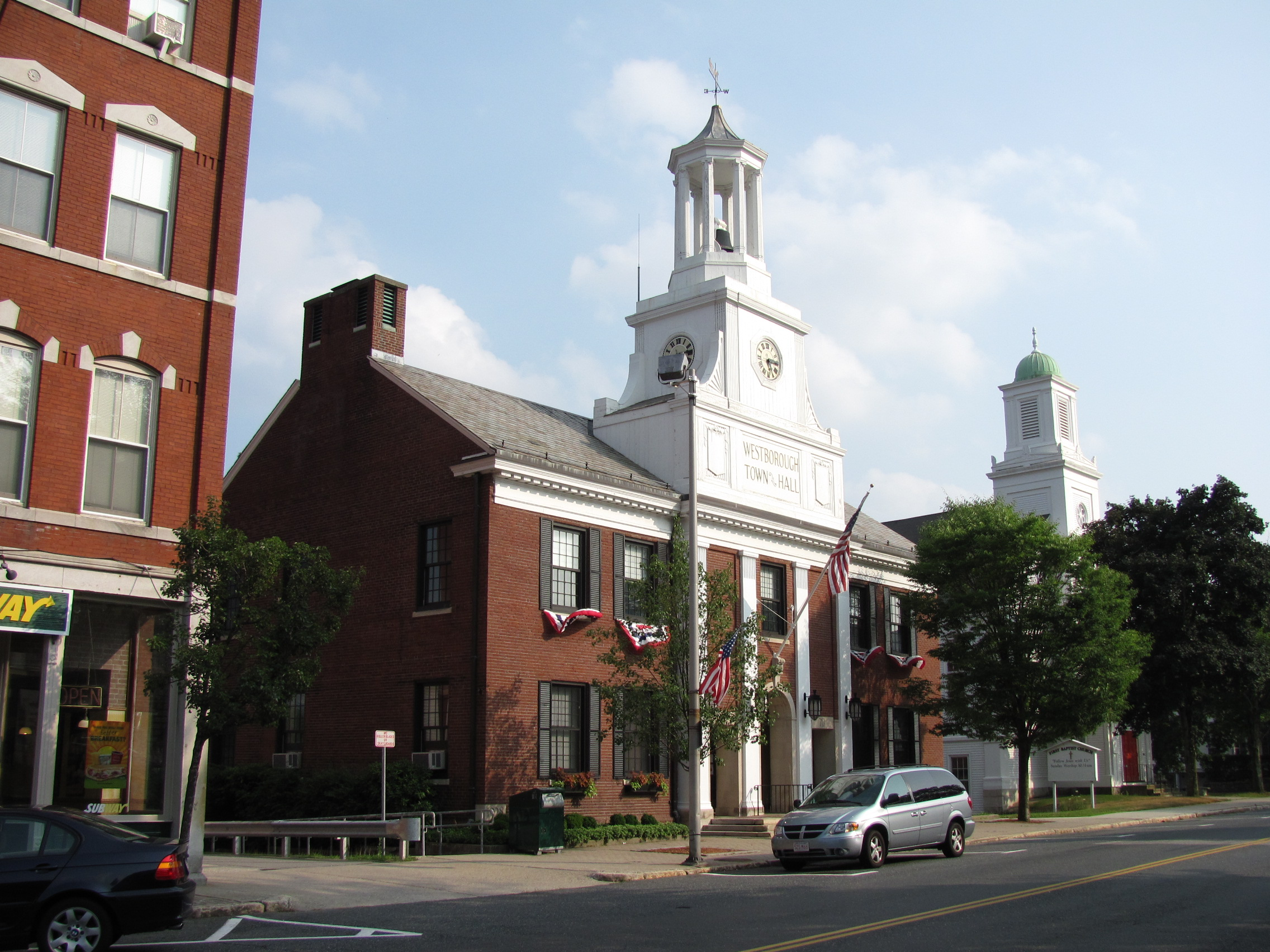
- Westborough Town Hall

- Location in Worcester County and the state of Massachusetts.
- Coordinates: 42°16′11″N 71°37′2″W
- Country: United States
- State: Massachusetts
- County: Worcester

Area
  - Total: 1.90 sq mi (4.93 km^{2})
  - Land: 1.89 sq mi (4.89 km^{2})
  - Water: 0.015 sq mi (0.04 km^{2})
- Elevation: 312 ft (95 m)

Population (2020)
  - Total: 4,255
  - Density: 2,253.6/sq mi (870.12/km^{2})
- Time zone: UTC-5 (Eastern (EST))
  - Summer (DST): UTC-4 (EDT)
- ZIP Code: 01581
- Area code: 508
- FIPS code: 25-75050
- GNIS feature ID: 0611409

Westborough is a census-designated place (CDP) in the town of Westborough in Worcester County, Massachusetts, United States. The population was 4,045 at the 2010 census.

== Geography ==
According to the United States Census Bureau, the CDP has a total area of 4.9 km^{2} (1.9 sq mi), all land.

== Demographics ==
Historical population
| Census | Pop. | Note | %± |
|---|---|---|---|
| 2020 | 4,255 | | — |
U.S. Decennial Census

At the 2000 census there were 3,983 people, 1,719 households, and 947 families in the CDP. The population density was 809.4 people/km^{2} (2,096 people/mi^{2}). There were 1,781 housing units at an average density of 361.9 units/km^{2} (937 units/mi^{2}). The racial makeup of the CDP was 94.38% White, 1.58% Black or African American, 0.23% Native American, 1.96% Asian, 0.65% from other races, and 1.21% from two or more races. Hispanic or Latino of any race were 3.14%.

Of the 1,719 households 27.0% had children under the age of 18 living with them, 44.3% were married couples living together, 8.3% had a female householder with no husband present, and 44.9% were non-families. 36.6% of households were one person and 13.3% were one person aged 65 or older. The average household size was 2.22 and the average family size was 2.99.

The age distribution was 22.0% under the age of 18, 6.0% from 18 to 24, 34.8% from 25 to 44, 20.1% from 45 to 64, and 17.1% 65 or older. The median age was 38 years. For every 100 females, there were 91.1 males. For every 100 females age 18 and over, there were 85.1 males.

The median household income was $47,708 and the median family income was $65,841. Males had a median income of $46,104 versus $34,712 for females. The per capita income for the CDP was $27,119. About 5.7% of families and 6.5% of the population were below the poverty line, including 5.3% of those under age 18 and 12.2% of those age 65 or over.
