= Milford (CDP), Massachusetts =

Milford, Massachusetts
- CDP
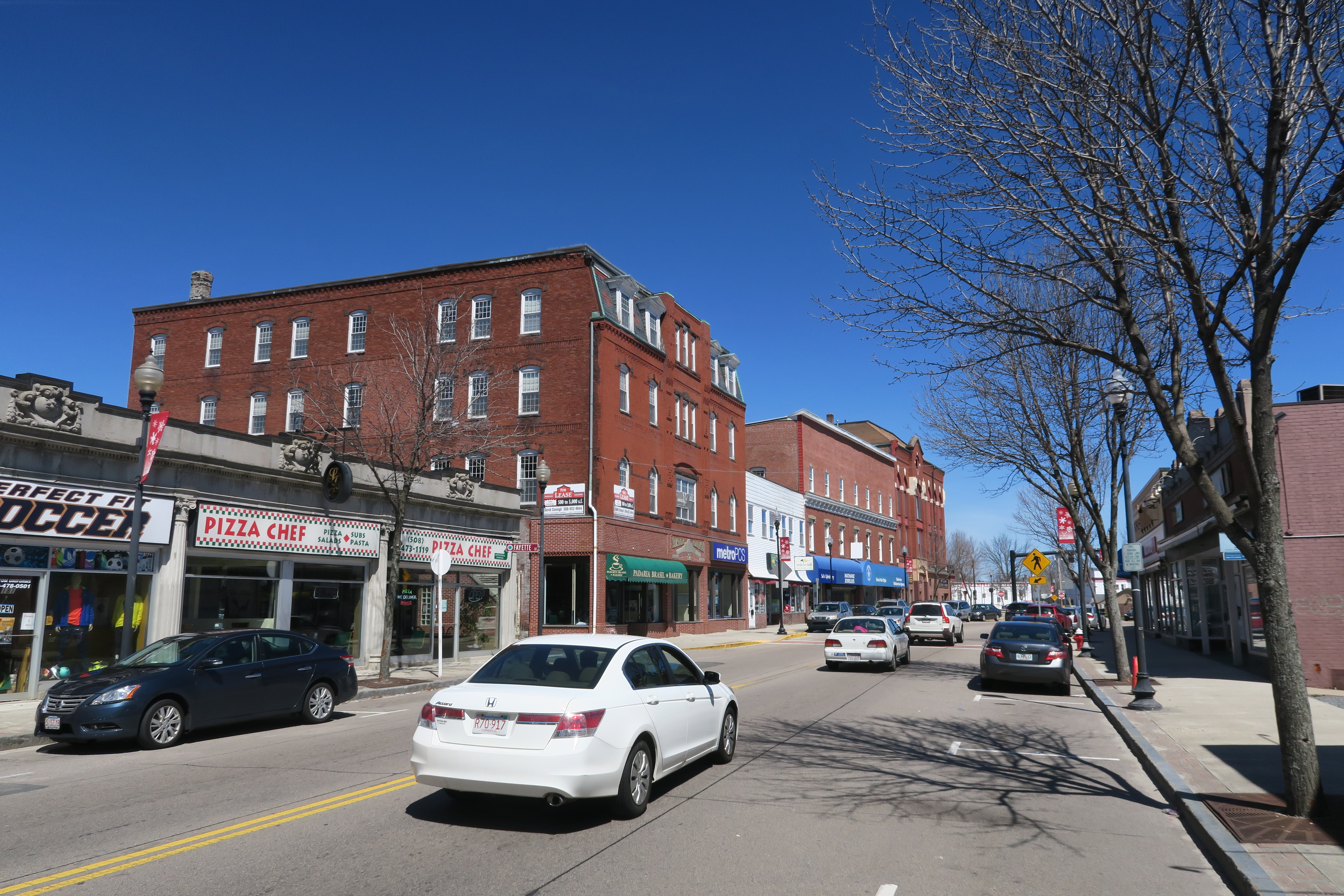
- Main Street

- Location in Worcester County and the state of Massachusetts.
- Coordinates: 42°8′45″N 71°31′8″W
- Country: United States
- State: Massachusetts
- County: Worcester

Area
  - Total: 10.39 sq mi (26.91 km^{2})
  - Land: 10.15 sq mi (26.30 km^{2})
  - Water: 0.24 sq mi (0.61 km^{2})
- Elevation: 259 ft (79 m)

Population (2020)
  - Total: 26,971
  - Density: 2,656.1/sq mi (1,025.53/km^{2})
- Time zone: UTC-5 (Eastern (EST))
  - Summer (DST): UTC-4 (EDT)
- ZIP code: 01757
- Area code: 508 / 774
- FIPS code: 25-41200
- GNIS feature ID: 0611362

Milford is a census-designated place (CDP) in the town of Milford in Worcester County, Massachusetts, United States. The population was 25,055 at the 2010 census.

== Geography ==
Milford is located at 42°8′44″N 71°31′8″W (42.145828, -71.518975).

According to the United States Census Bureau, the CDP has a total area of 26.5 km^{2} (10.2 sq mi), of which 25.8 km^{2} (10.0 sq mi) is land and 0.6 km^{2} (0.23 sq mi) (2.35%) is water.

== Demographics ==
Historical population
Census	Pop.	Note	%±
2020	26,971		—
U.S. Decennial Census

As of the census of 2000, there were 24,230 people, 9,566 households, and 6,447 families residing in the CDP. The population density was 937.4 people/km^{2} (2,428 people/mi^{2}). There were 9,834 housing units at an average density of 380.5 units/km^{2} (985 units/mi^{2}). The racial makeup of the CDP was 92.53% White, 1.42% Black or African American, 0.12% Native American, 1.82% Asian, 0.07% Pacific Islander, 2.13% from other races, and 1.91% from two or more races. Hispanic or Latino of any race were 4.66% of the population.

There were 9,566 households, out of which 32.3% had children under the age of 18 living with them, 51.7% were married couples living together, 11.7% had a female householder with no husband present, and 32.6% were non-families. 27.0% of all households were made up of individuals, and 10.2% had someone living alone who was 65 years of age or older. The average household size was 2.50 and the average family size was 3.06.

In the CDP, the population was spread out, with 24.3% under the age of 18, 6.7% from 18 to 24, 33.1% from 25 to 44, 22.2% from 45 to 64, and 13.7% who were 65 years of age or older. The median age was 37 years. For every 100 females, there were 93.3 males. For every 100 females age 18 and over, there were 89.6 males.

The median income for a household in the CDP was $47,090, and the median income for a family was $58,321. Males had a median income of $41,250 versus $30,541 for females. The per capita income for the CDP was $22,813. About 6.1% of families and 7.6% of the population were below the poverty line, including 9.6% of those under age 18 and 10.6% of those age 65 or over.
