= Sturbridge Common Historic District =

Historic district in Massachusetts, United States

- U.S. National Register of Historic Places
- U.S. Historic district
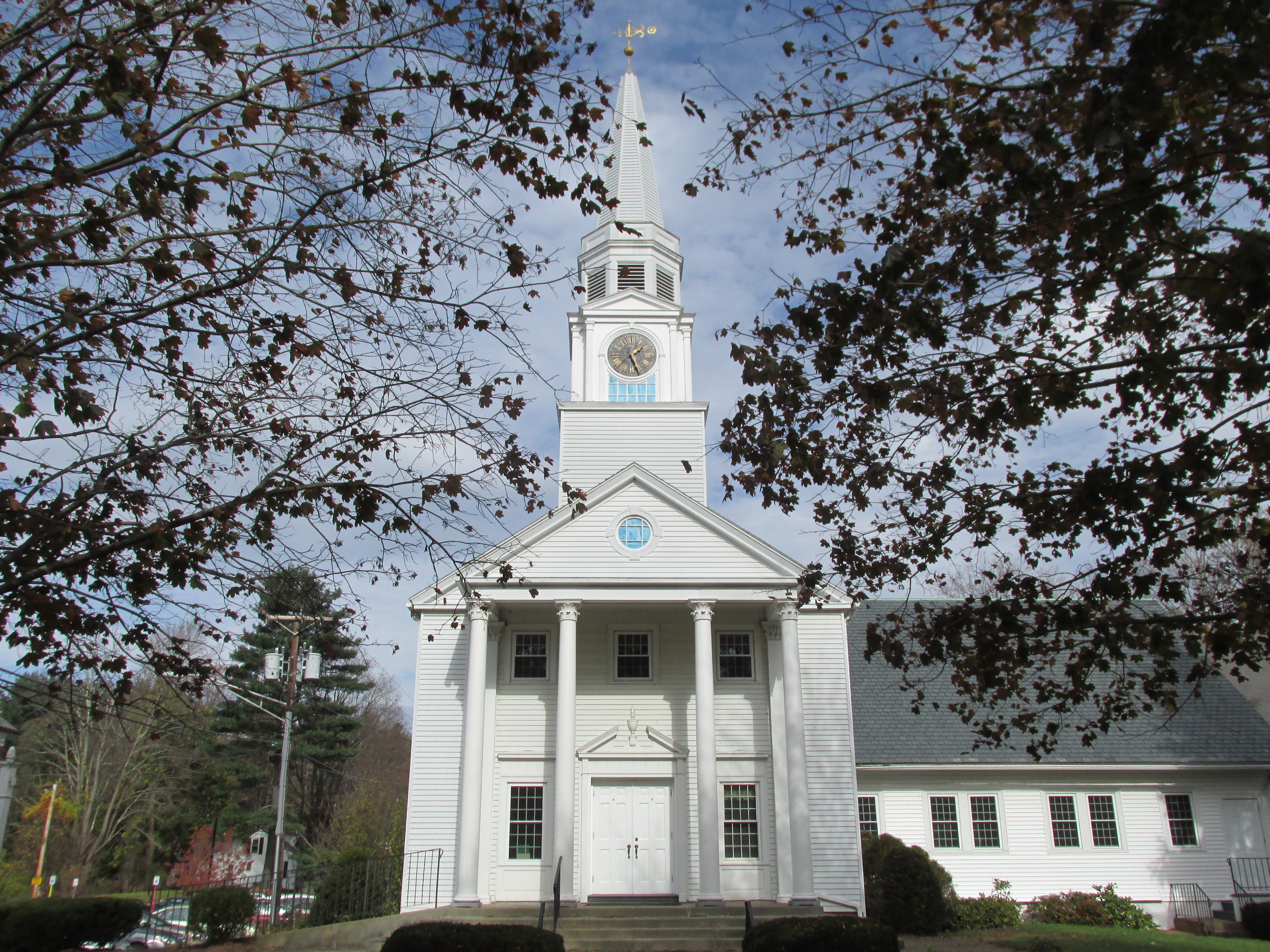
- Sturbridge Federated Church

- Location within Massachusetts Location within the United States
- Location: Sturbridge, Massachusetts
- Coordinates: 42°6′25″N 72°4′44″W
- Area: 138.15 acres (55.91 ha)
- Built: 1772
- Architectural style: Late 19th and 20th Century Revivals, Greek Revival, Federal
- NRHP reference No.: 77000656
- Added to NRHP: November 9, 1977

The Sturbridge Common Historic District encompasses the historic center of Sturbridge, Massachusetts. Encompassing some 138 acres (56 ha), the district is focused around the town common, which was laid out when the town established in 1738. The district is roughly linear, extending along Main Street from its junction with Interstate 84 eastward to Hall Road. The district also extends for short distances along Haynes, Maple, and Charlton Streets. Although most of the properties in the district are residential, the institutional properties, including the 1838 Greek Revival Town Hall, the 1896 Joshua Hyde Library building, and the 1922 Federated Church. The oldest building in the district is the c. 1772 Publick House, a tavern which has dominated the south side of the district since its construction.

The district was listed on the National Register of Historic Places in 1977.

== See also ==
- National Register of Historic Places listings in Worcester County, Massachusetts
