= Tobin's Beach Site =

- U.S. National Register of Historic Places
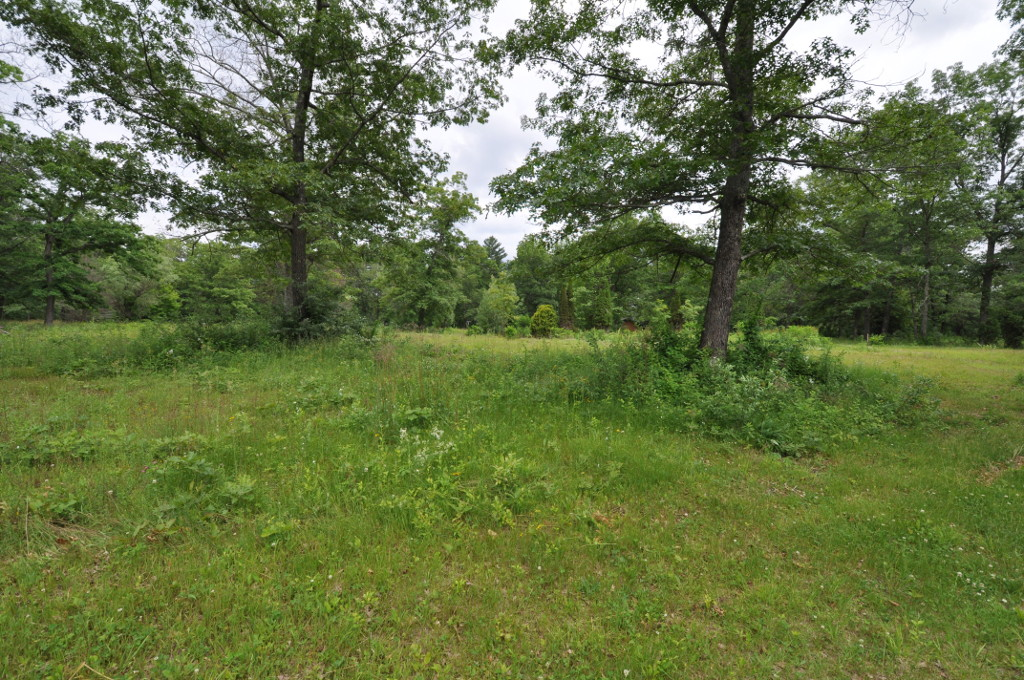
- Location: Brookfield, Massachusetts
- NRHP reference No.: 86003808 (original); 100003227 (increase)

Significant dates
- Added to NRHP: July 22, 1986
- Boundary increase: December 17, 2018

The Tobin's Beach Site is a prehistoric archaeological site in Brookfield, Massachusetts. Discovered in 1963, it is one of a small number of sites in New England known for preserving elements of the Adena culture. The site was declared eligible for listing on the National Register of Historic Places in 1986, and was formally listed in an enlarged state in 2018.

The site was discovered on a local campground in 1963. Preliminary investigation of the site yielded fourteen burials. Artifacts connecting the site to the Adena culture include a drilled clay tube, and a projectile point made of stone from Ohio. Of less certain age were a series of postholes, arranged in a semi-circle that is consistent with an interpretation as a wigwam site.

The site has been claimed as an ancestral graveyard by the local Nipmuc people.

== See also ==
- National Register of Historic Places listings in Worcester County, Massachusetts
