= Eddy Block =

- U.S. National Register of Historic Places
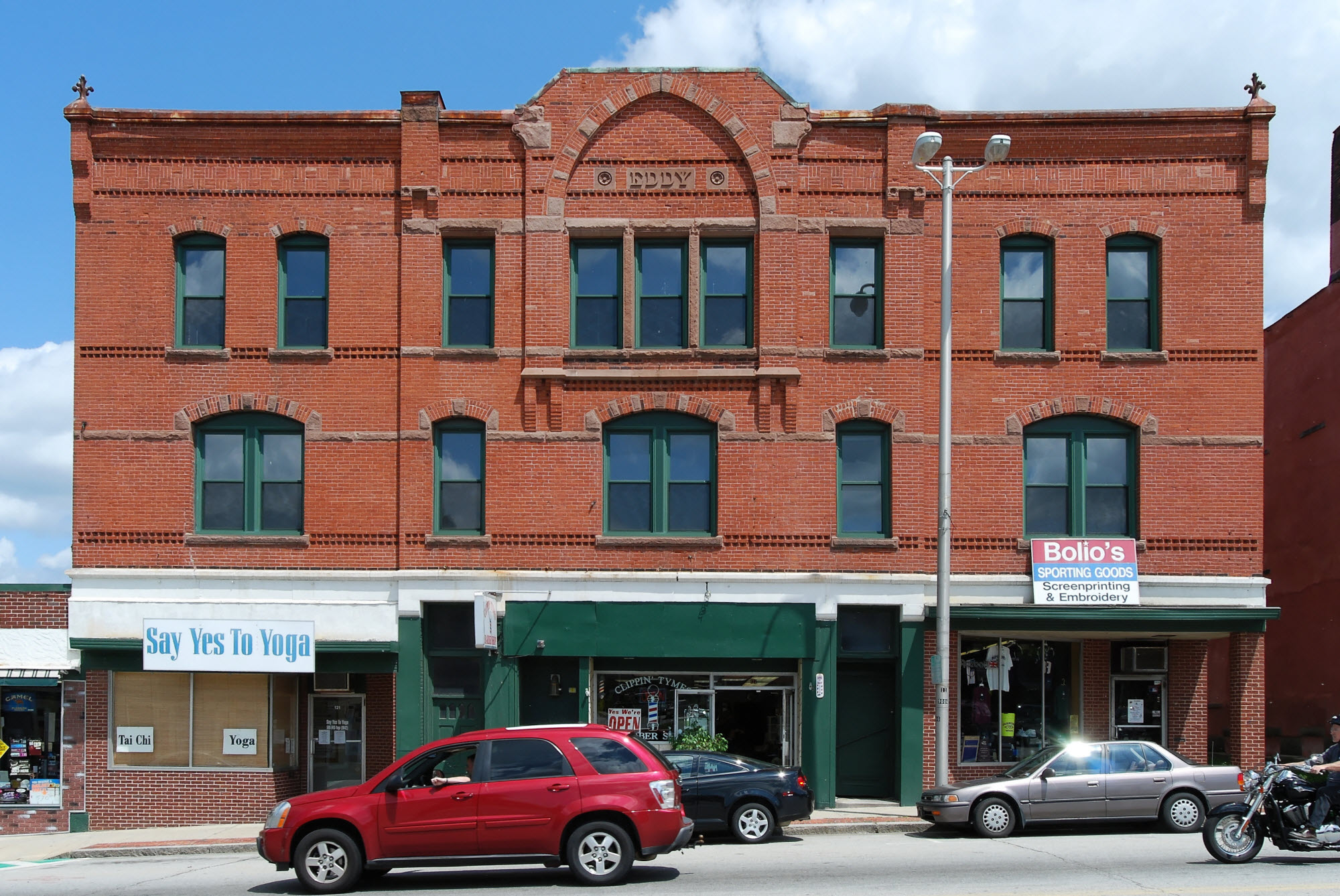

- Location within Massachusetts Location within the United States
- Location: 119-131 Main St., Webster, Massachusetts
- Coordinates: 42°2′56″N 71°53′5″W
- Built: 1878
- Architectural style: Gothic Revival
- NRHP reference No.: 80000470
- Added to NRHP: December 3, 1980

The Eddy Block is a historic commercial building in Webster, Massachusetts. The three-story brick building was built by Lyman R. Eddy in 1878 on the site of a previous block which had been destroyed by fire. The Gothic Revival building has had a variety of tenants, including the post office, a district court, the Masonic Lodge (the latter two in the upper floor meeting space), and the Webster Times.

The building was listed on the National Register of Historic Places in 1980.

== See also ==
- National Register of Historic Places listings in Worcester County, Massachusetts
