= Hayward Mill =

- U.S. National Register of Historic Places
- U.S. Historic district
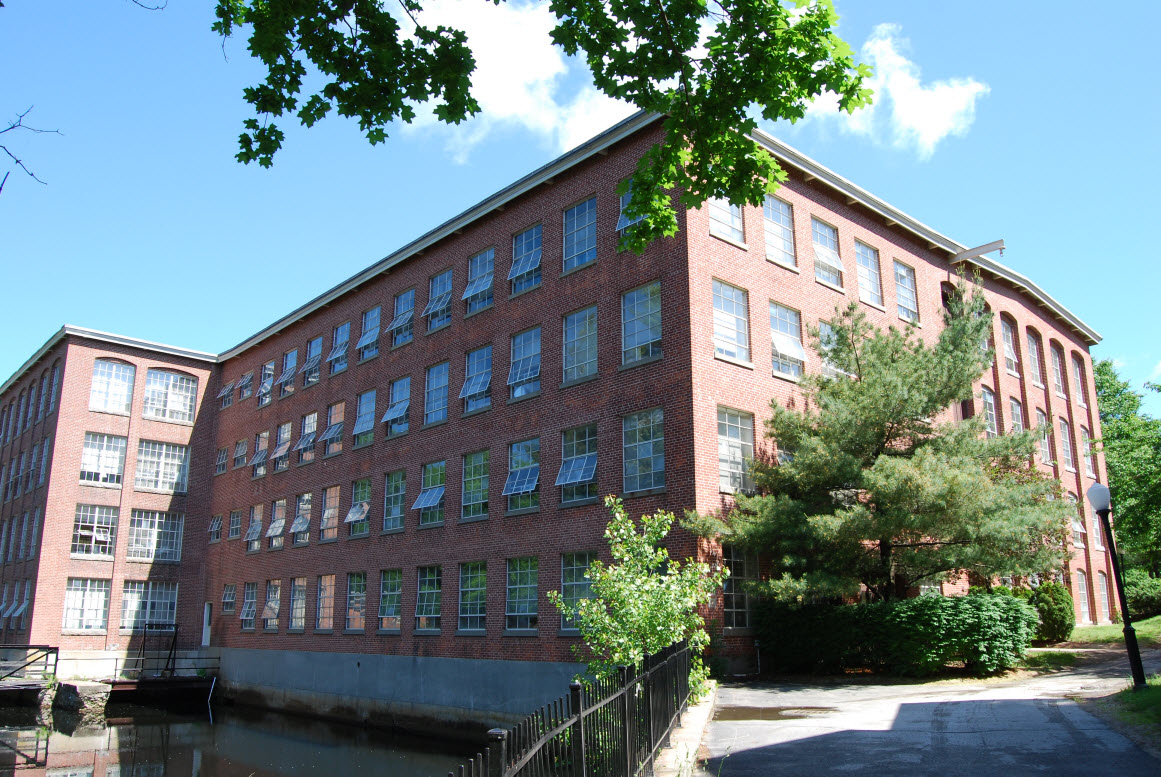

- Location within Massachusetts Location within the United States
- Location: Douglas, Massachusetts
- Coordinates: 42°4′30″N 71°42′43″W
- Area: 8.5 acres (3.4 ha)
- Built: 1898
- Architect: Kain, Charles T., Eng.; Cole & Kimball, Eng.
- Architectural style: Classical Revival, Italianate, Moderne
- NRHP reference No.: 91000695
- Added to NRHP: June 17, 1991

The Hayward Mill is a historic mill complex at the junction of North and Cook Streets, on the Mumford River in Douglas, Massachusetts. The site, with an industrial history dating to the 18th century, is populated by a series of connected buildings dating to 1880 or later. The mill was the first financial successful textile operation in Douglas, and was operated until the 1960s. The mill complex was listed on the National Register of Historic Places in 1991. It has been converted to residential use.

== Description and history ==
The Hayward Mill complex is located on a bend in the Mumford River in East Douglas, bounded on the southeast by North Street. Southwest of the complex the river is dammed, creating a mill pond and water source from which the mill drew power. The mill complex has three buildings, of which two are large multi-section structures. The Mill and Dye House is the principal mill building, with sections three and four stories in height, built out of brick. The oldest portion of this building was built in 1880, after a previous mill on the site burned down. To its east stands the Boiler House, a two-story brick structure with smokestack, built in 1898. South of the main mill and set between the mill pond and North Street is the single-story Office, now converted to a private residence. It is the most architecturally distinguished of the three buildings, exhibiting Italianate styling.

The site has a known, if poorly documented, history dating back to the 18th century. A water privilege (right to divert water or dam the river) was granted in 1750, and a grist mill was known to be operating on the site in the late 19th century. A new dam was built on the site in 1795, and the first textile mill was built on the site in 1863. This building burned down in 1880, although parts of its water works were apparently incorporated into the present mill. The Hayward Woolen Company was a partnership between Moses Taft and his son-in-law, William Hayward. At first, in the 1870s, it owned mill properties that were leased to others to operate, the mill on this site among them. When it burned down, they rebuilt in brick, and began manufacturing woolen products. The company remained in operation on this site, under a variety of names but generally under control of the Haywards and their descendants, until 1966. A related company, the Hayward-Schuster Company, continued operations until 1982. After a variety of other lighter manufacturing uses, the property has been rehabilitated and converted to residential use.

== See also ==
- National Register of Historic Places listings in Worcester County, Massachusetts
