= Matthews Fulling Mill Site =

- U.S. National Register of Historic Places
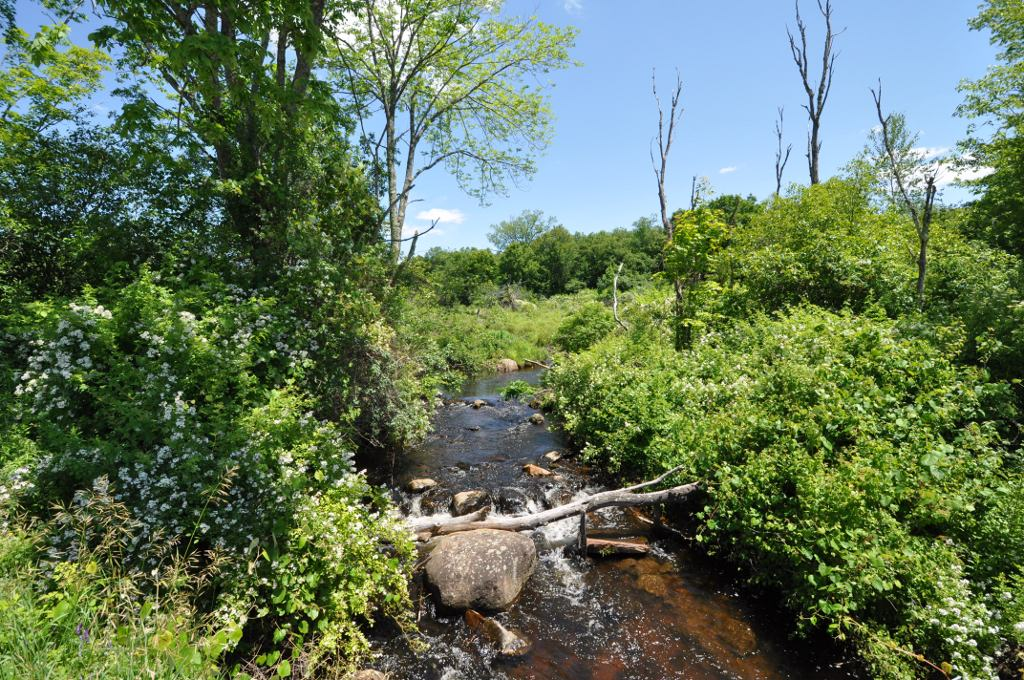
- Sucker Brook off Mill St. in North Brookfield; the mill was located near this crossing
- Nearest city: North Brookfield, Massachusetts
- Built: 1749
- NRHP reference No.: 75000302
- Added to NRHP: November 12, 1975

The Matthews Fulling Mill Site is an historic colonial industrial site at North Brookfield, Massachusetts. It is the location of a fulling mill established by Daniel Mathews c. 1749. This mill was where Rufus Putnam, the American Revolutionary War officer and early settler of the Ohio Country, was apprenticed to Mathews, who was his brother-in-law. The mill was located on Sucker Brook near the town line with New Braintree.

The site was listed on the National Register of Historic Places in 1975.

== See also ==
- National Register of Historic Places listings in Worcester County, Massachusetts
