= Rock Castle School =

- U.S. National Register of Historic Places
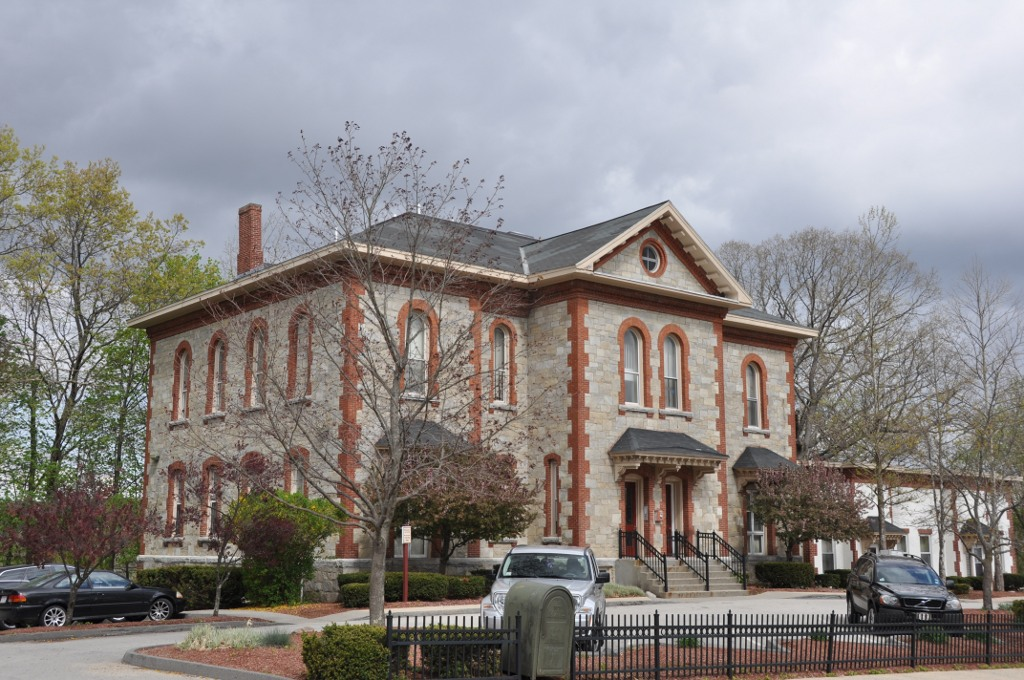

- Location within Massachusetts Location within the United States
- Location: Webster, Massachusetts
- Coordinates: 42°3′13″N 71°52′41″W
- Built: 1871
- Architect: Earle & Fuller; Larned & Chaugh
- Architectural style: Italianate
- NRHP reference No.: 89000437
- Added to NRHP: June 7, 1989

The Rock Castle School is a historic school building on Prospect Street in Webster, Massachusetts. The two story masonry building was built in 1871, and was Webster's second high school building. It served that purpose until 1905, after which it intermittently served a variety of public and private educational purposes until 1972. The building has Italianate styling, with high and narrow round-arch windows, and a projecting central pavilion that has a gable end with an oculus window. The building is predominantly light shades of polychrome granite, with brick quoining.

The building was listed on the National Register of Historic Places in 1989. It has been converted to residential use.

== See also ==
- National Register of Historic Places listings in Worcester County, Massachusetts
