= Manning-Ball House =

Historic house in Massachusetts, United States

- U.S. National Register of Historic Places
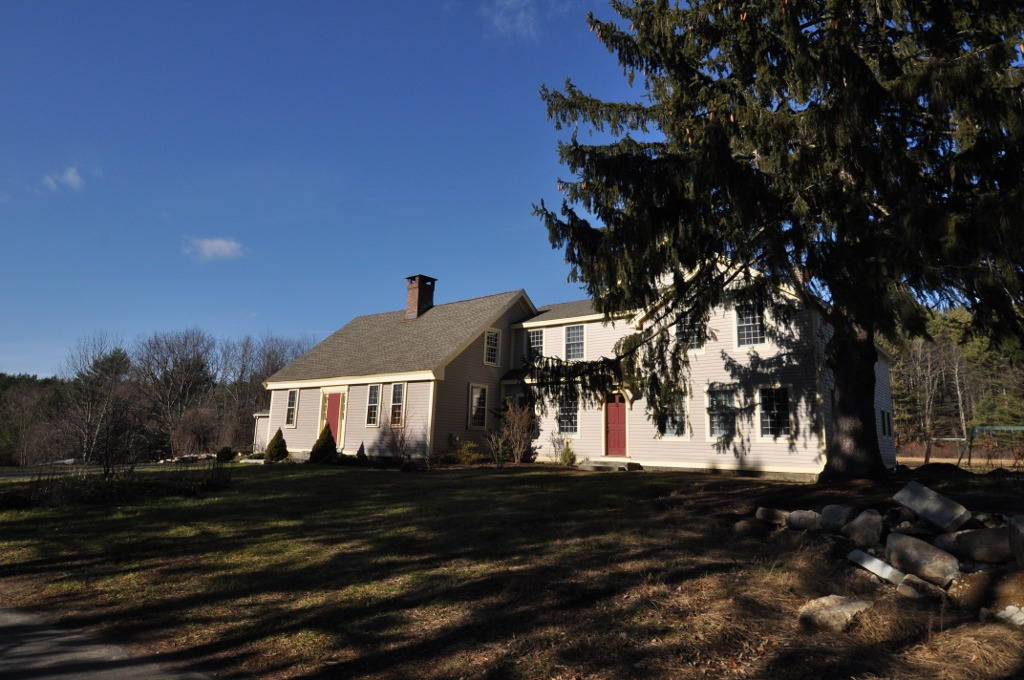

- Location within Massachusetts Location within the United States
- Location: 370 Manning Street, Town of Holden, Jefferson, Massachusetts
- Coordinates: 42°23′10″N 71°50′8″W
- Area: 6 acres (2.4 ha)
- Built: 1790
- Architectural style: Cape Cod
- NRHP reference No.: 95001442
- Added to NRHP: December 13, 1995

The Manning-Ball House is a historic house at 370 Manning Street in Jefferson, a village of Holden, Massachusetts. It is estimated to have been built c. 1790, and is a well-preserved vernacular four-bay Cape style house. It was listed on the National Register of Historic Places on December 13, 1995.

== Description and history ==
The house is set on the west side of Manning Street, in the northeastern part of the rural town of Holden. The main house is a 1 1/2-story wood-frame structure, four bays wide, with a side gable roof, central chimney, and stone foundation. Modern additions extend the house to the right and rear. The main entrance, in the bay second from left, is flanked by sidelight windows, with otherwise simple framing topped by a cornice. The interior of the main block has retained much original detail, including its fireplaces, wide wainscoting, and wide pine flooring in the kitchen. The floor plan is a central hall plan modified because the house is not a typical five bays wide, with a larger parlor and a smaller hall space on either side of the chimney, and the kitchen behind. Modern facilities have been built into the ells.

The house was built c. 1790 by Captain Israel Manning, a veteran of the American Revolutionary War. Manning's son sold a portion of his father's original tract, with this house, to Josiah Ball, who had married his sister. The house remained in the hands of Ball descendants until 1947. At some point in the 20th century it was converted into a two-family, but has since been restored to single-family use. The house is unusual in Holden as a four-bay Cape, and is well-preserved for its age.

== See also ==
- National Register of Historic Places listings in Worcester County, Massachusetts
