= Azariah Newton House =

Historic house in Massachusetts, United States

- U.S. National Register of Historic Places
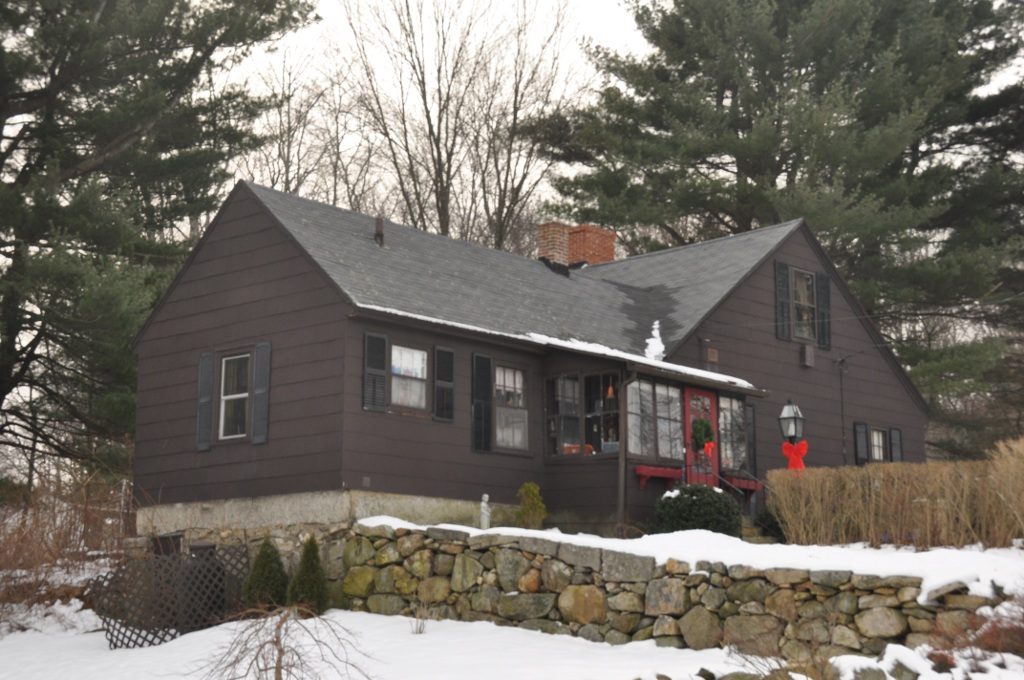

- Location within Massachusetts Location within the United States
- Location: Milford, Massachusetts
- Coordinates: 42°10′2″N 71°32′8″W
- Built: 1747
- Architectural style: Georgian
- NRHP reference No.: 99001252
- Added to NRHP: October 14, 1999

The Azariah Newton House is a historic house at 44 Silver Hill Road in Milford, Massachusetts. It is a 1 1/2-story wood-frame Cape style house, with a side-gable roof, clapboard siding, and large central chimney. The interior has retained substantial interior finishing, including floors, fireplaces, and room layout. The house was built in 1747 by Azariah Newton, one of the area's early settlers, and is one of Milford's oldest houses.

The house was listed on the National Register of Historic Places in 1999.

== See also ==
- National Register of Historic Places listings in Worcester County, Massachusetts
