= Lancaster Mills =

- U.S. National Register of Historic Places
- U.S. Historic district
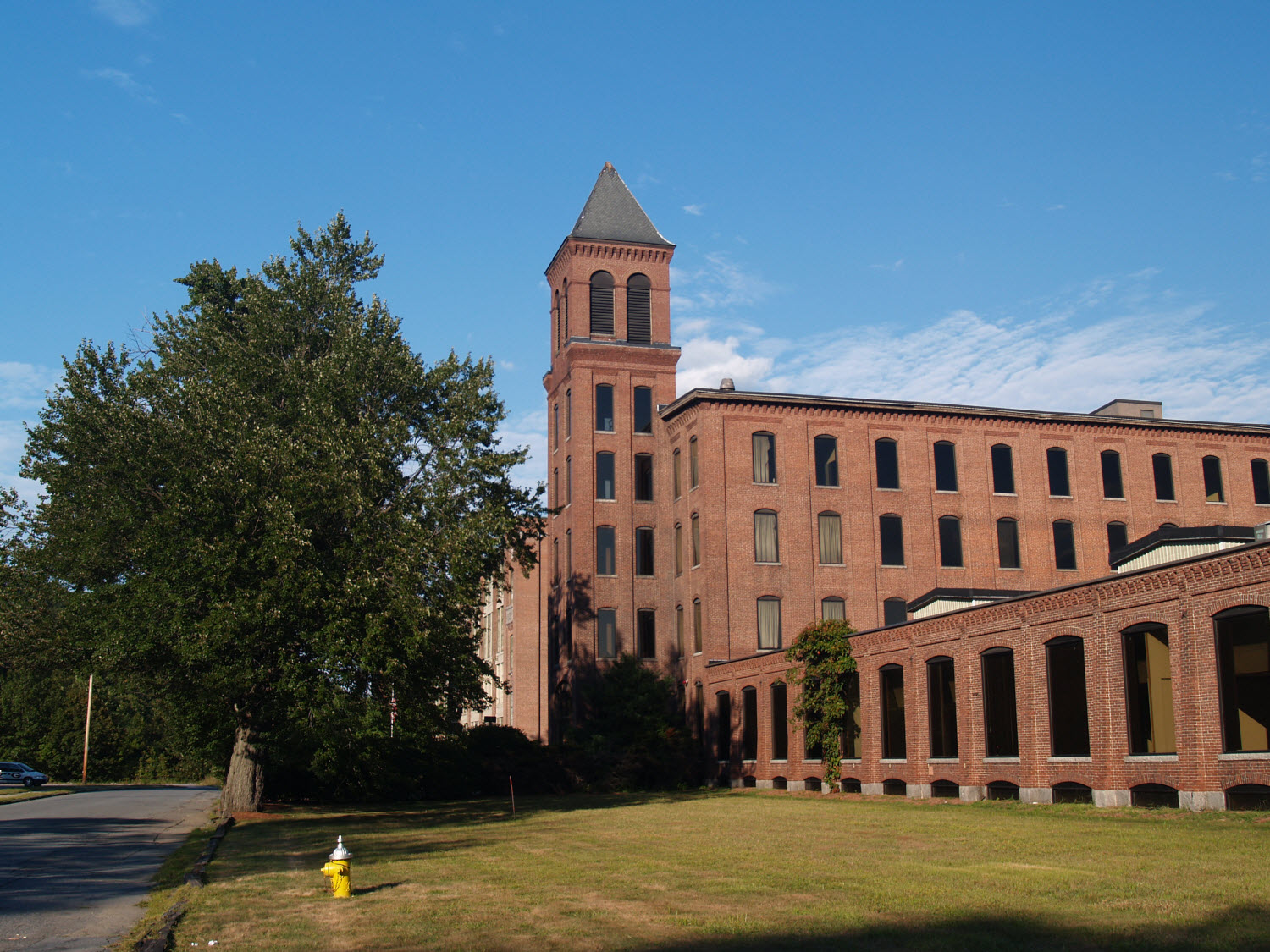

- Location within Massachusetts Location within the United States
- Location: 1-55, 75, 99, 1-R Green St., 20 Cameron St., Clinton, Massachusetts
- Coordinates: 42.4119°N 71.6803°W
- Area: 29.1 acres (11.8 ha)
- Built: 1844
- Built by: William T. Merrifield
- Architectural style: Italianate
- NRHP reference No.: 10000005
- Added to NRHP: January 29, 2010

The Lancaster Mills are a 19th-century complex of predominantly brick mill buildings at the corner of Green and Chestnut Streets, near the center of Clinton, Massachusetts. Founded in 1844 by a group led by Erastus and Horatio Bigelow, the Lancaster Mills were the first major mill to produce gingham fabrics. Its success in the 1840s led to the establishment of the town of Clinton out of Lancaster. The 29-acre (12 ha) complex was expanded regularly throughout the 19th century and was used for textile manufacturing into the 20th century.

The Mills, and the Tenement houses adjacent to the Mills, were built by William T. Merrifield, a contractor from nearby Worcester Massachusetts. Merrifield won the contract in 1844 and completed the construction in 1848. During those four years he lived in Clinton.

The mill complex was listed on the National Register of Historic Places in 2010.

== See also ==
- National Register of Historic Places listings in Worcester County, Massachusetts
