= Barnes-Hill House =

Historic house in Massachusetts, United States

- U.S. National Register of Historic Places
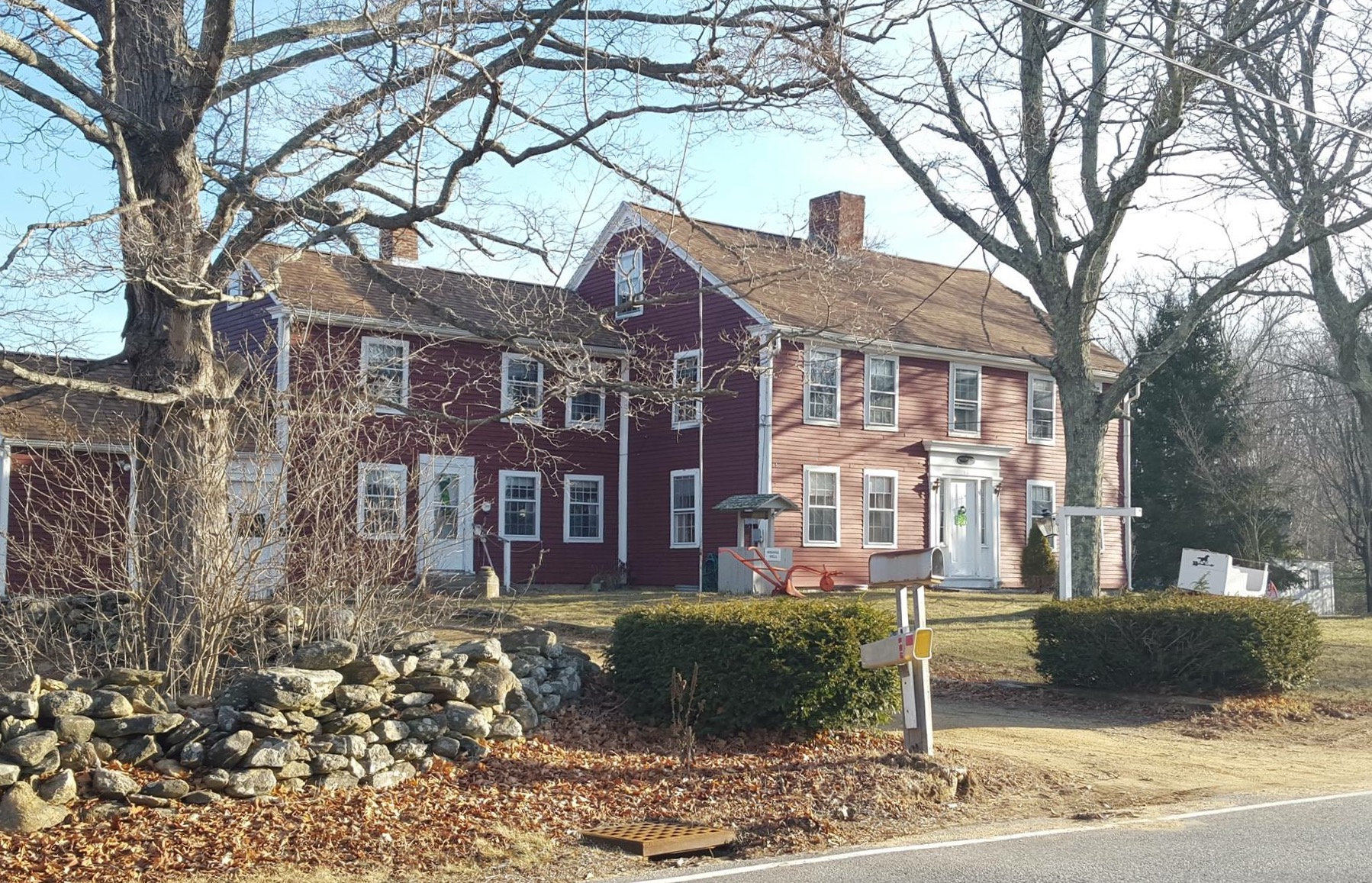

- Location within Massachusetts Location within the United States
- Location: 12 N. Brookfield Rd., Spencer, Massachusetts
- Coordinates: 42°15′41″N 72°0′50″W
- Area: 6.4 acres (2.6 ha)
- Built: c. 1800
- Architectural style: Federal
- NRHP reference No.: 15001007
- Added to NRHP: January 26, 2016

The Barnes-Hill House is a historic house at 12 North Brookfield Road in Spencer, Massachusetts. Built about 1800, it is a well-preserved local example of Federal architecture, and was home to figures influential in the development of the Hillsville area where it stands. The house was listed on the National Register of Historic Places in 2016.

== Description and history ==
The Barnes-Hill House is located in a rural-residential area of northern Spencer, on the north side of North Brookfield Road a short way west of its junction with North Spencer Road. It is a 2 1/2-story wood-frame structure, five bays wide, with a side-gable roof, central chimney, clapboard siding, and stone foundation. A two-story wing extends to the left, and a 1 1/2-story wing extends to the right and partially to the rear, giving the house a partial saltbox profile. The main entrance has a Greek Revival surround, with sidelight windows, fluted pilasters, and a corniced entablature. The interior follows a typical central chimney plan, somewhat unusual for a period when center hall plans were more common.

Thought by local historians to date to the 1760s (supposedly built by David Barnes), it was more likely built c. 1800. Its most prominent owner was Sullivan Hill, whose family was related to the Barneses by marriage. He established a chair factory across the street from the house, spurring the development of a small village centered on the nearby road junction called Hillsville. Hill is said to have introduced the cane-seated chair to Massachusetts. The house remained in the Hill family until 1929.

== See also ==
- National Register of Historic Places listings in Worcester County, Massachusetts
