= Paddock Farm =

- U.S. National Register of Historic Places
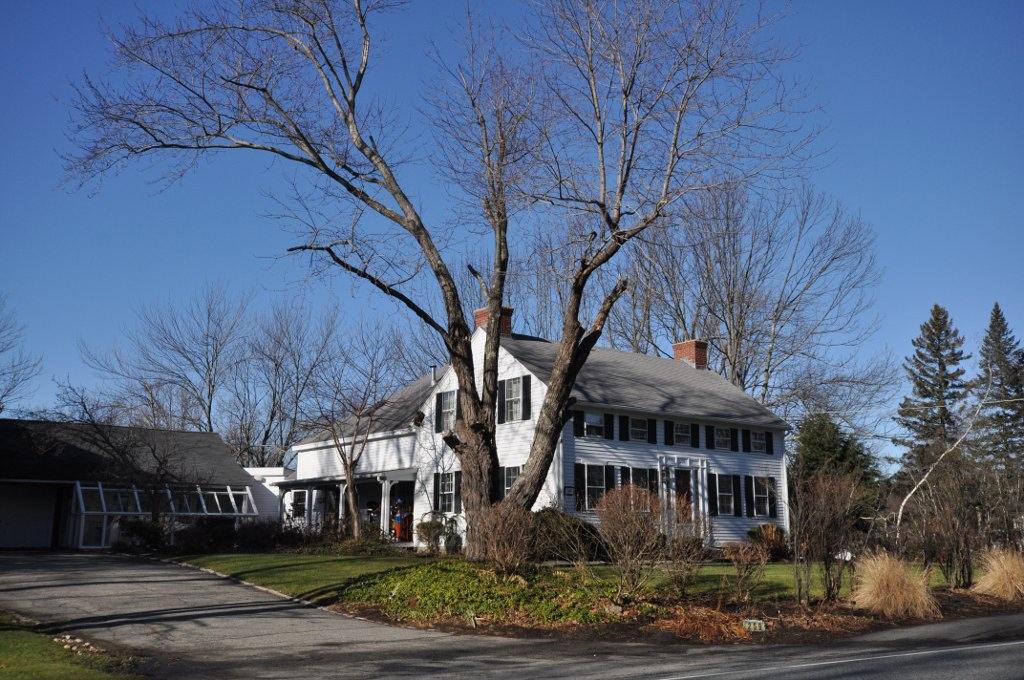

- Location within Massachusetts Location within the United States
- Location: Holden, Massachusetts, United States
- Coordinates: 42°20′2″N 71°50′57″W
- Built: 1780
- Architectural style: Greek Revival
- NRHP reference No.: 96000143
- Added to NRHP: February 23, 1996

Paddock Farm is a historic farmstead at 259 Salisbury Street in Holden, Massachusetts, United States. The main house, built c. 1840 and attached to a c. 1780 earlier house, is a well-preserved example of a local variant of a Cape style house. It is built with a knee-walled second story, with short windows set below the eave. The farmstead was listed on the National Register of Historic Places in 1996.

== Description and history ==
Paddock Farm is set in southern Holden, on the west side of Salisbury Street opposite its junction with Newell Road. The roughly 7-acre (2.8 ha) property includes the main house with an attached ell, a small barn, boathouse on adjacent Dawson Pond, and chicken coop. Traditional New England fieldstone walls line the property. The main house is a 1 1/2-story wood-frame structure, five bays wide, with a side-gable roof, end chimneys, clapboard siding, and a stone foundation. The center entry is framed by sidelight windows and topped by an entablature. The first-floor windows are typical 6-over-6 sash windows, while there are small 3-over-3 windows set in the kneewalls of the second floor. The rear ell, a similar 1 1/2-story structure with slightly extended height, is oriented with its gable perpendicular to that of the main house. It is joined at the other end to a small barn.

The main block of the house was built about 1840 by Jonathan Paddock, who lived on the property for more than 50 years. The ell to which it is attached is estimated to have been built about 1780, probably by Jonathan's father Reuben. The house is basically a well-preserved example of vernacular Federal-Greek Revival styling, and is the best-preserved example of the local Cape variant with the second-floor kneewall windows. The interior of the house has retained a number of original features, despite having been broken into apartments for some time before being restored to single-family use in the mid-20th century.

== See also ==
- National Register of Historic Places listings in Worcester County, Massachusetts
