= No. 4 Schoolhouse =

- U.S. National Register of Historic Places
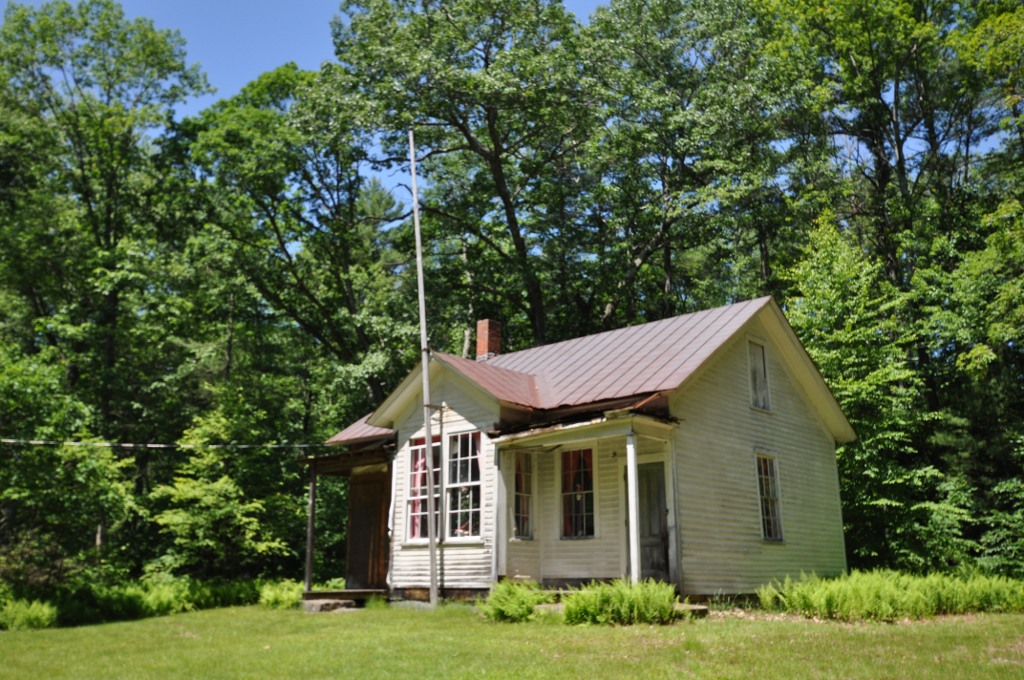

- Location within Massachusetts Location within the United States
- Location: Barre, Massachusetts
- Coordinates: 42°26′43″N 72°5′5″W
- Built: 1883
- Architect: Potter, James H.
- Architectural style: Late Victorian
- NRHP reference No.: 88000711
- Added to NRHP: June 22, 1988

The No. 4 Schoolhouse is an historic school building on Farrington Road near Sunrise Avenue in Barre, Massachusetts. The one-room wood-frame schoolhouse was built in 1883, and was at least the second schoolhouse in the town's fourth district. The building served as a schoolhouse until 1930, when the town centralized its schools. In 1937 the building was purchased by a local community organization dedicated to its preservation. It has served as a community center since then.

The building was listed on the National Register of Historic Places in 1988.

== See also ==
- National Register of Historic Places listings in Worcester County, Massachusetts
