= Wickaboag Valley Historic District =

Historic district in Massachusetts, United States

- U.S. National Register of Historic Places
- U.S. Historic district
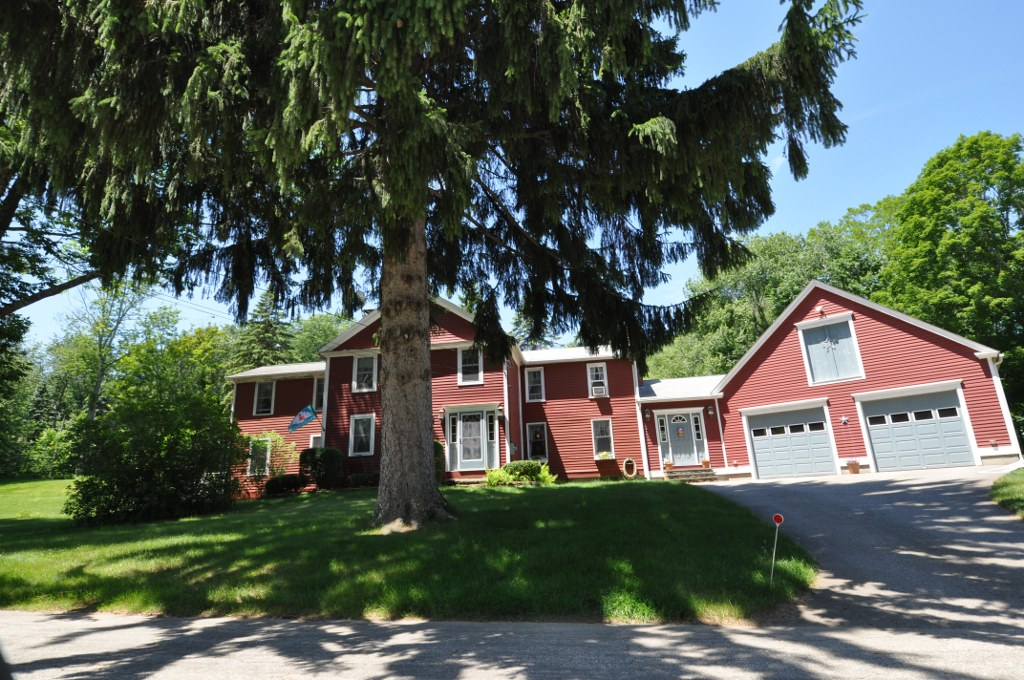
- A house on Mill Stone Road

- Location within Massachusetts Location within the United States
- Location: West Brookfield, Massachusetts
- Coordinates: 42°16′8″N 72°9′34″W
- Area: 400 acres (160 ha)
- Built: 1669
- Architectural style: Federal, Greek Revival
- NRHP reference No.: 00001201
- Added to NRHP: October 27, 2000

The Wickaboag Valley Historic District is a predominantly rural historic district in West Brookfield, Massachusetts. It is roughly bounded by Wickaboag Pond, Mill Stone Rd., Madden Rd., and the border with New Braintree. The central feature of the district is two branches of Sucker Brook, which empties into Wickaboag Pond, and the rural views of the valley through which these streams move. Except for a cluster of houses near Wickaboag Valley, Shea, Ragged Hill, and Mill Stone Roads, buildings are sparsely arranged on the roads that pass through the district. There are fourteen houses of historic interest, the oldest of which date to the 1790s. There are also archaeological remnants of the area's early industrial history, with documented mill sites dating to the late 17th century.

The district was listed on the National Register of Historic Places in 2000.

== See also ==
- National Register of Historic Places listings in Worcester County, Massachusetts

== Gallery ==
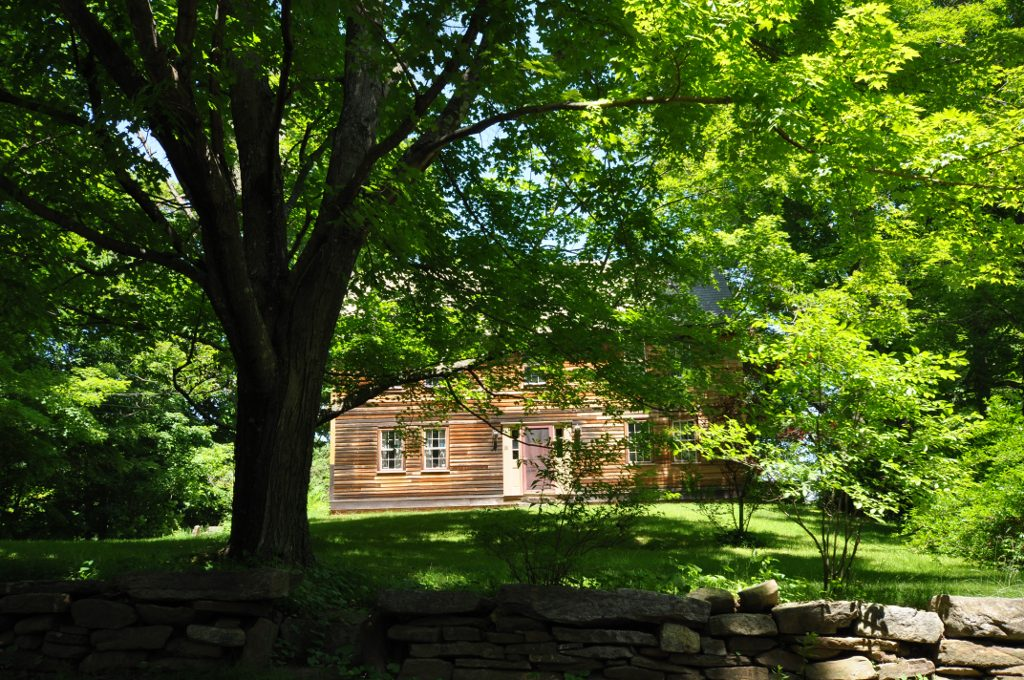
A house on Mill Stone Road

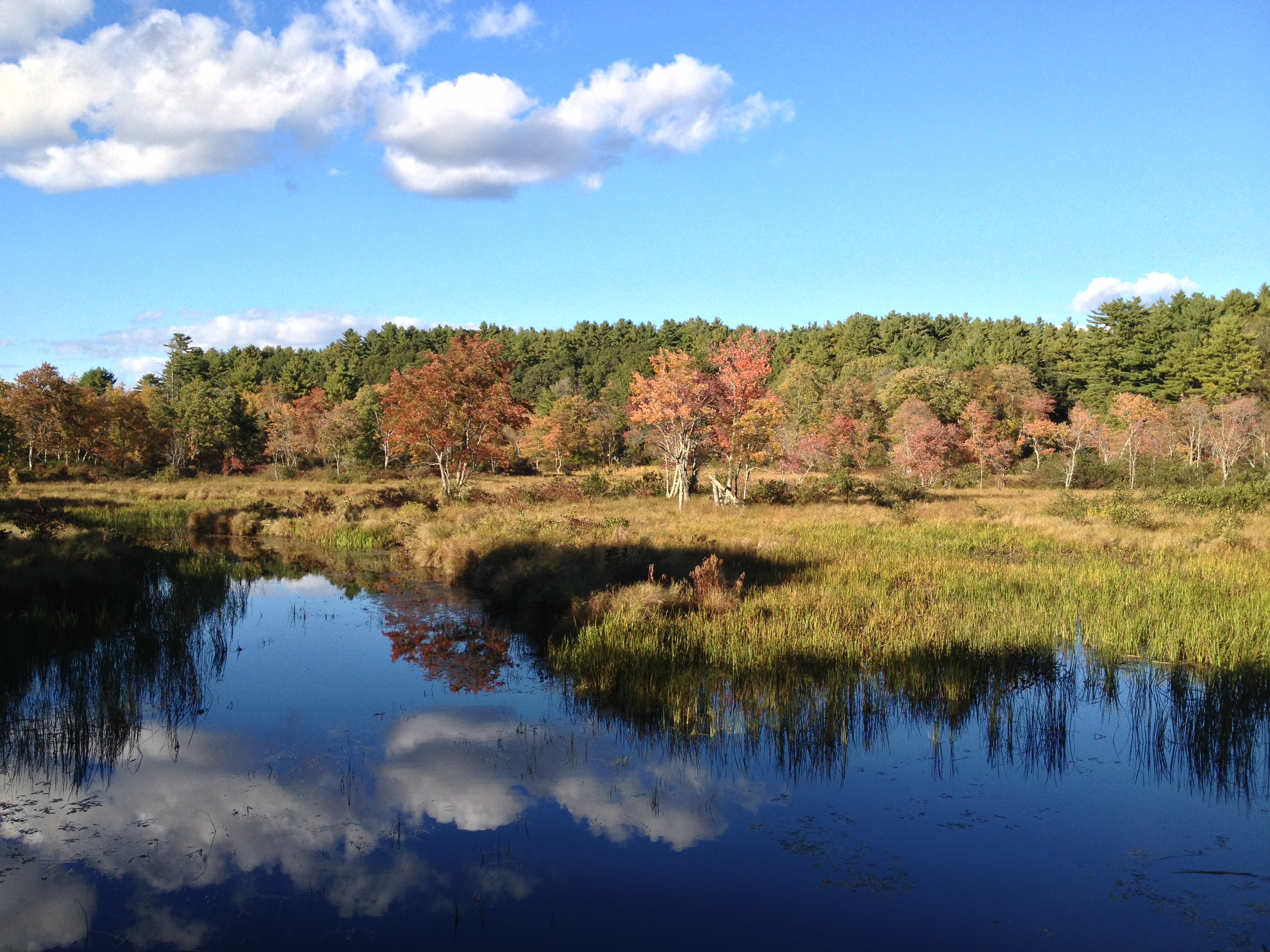
Sucker Brook, eastward view
