= First Baptist Church of Northborough =

Historic church in Massachusetts, United States

- U.S. National Register of Historic Places
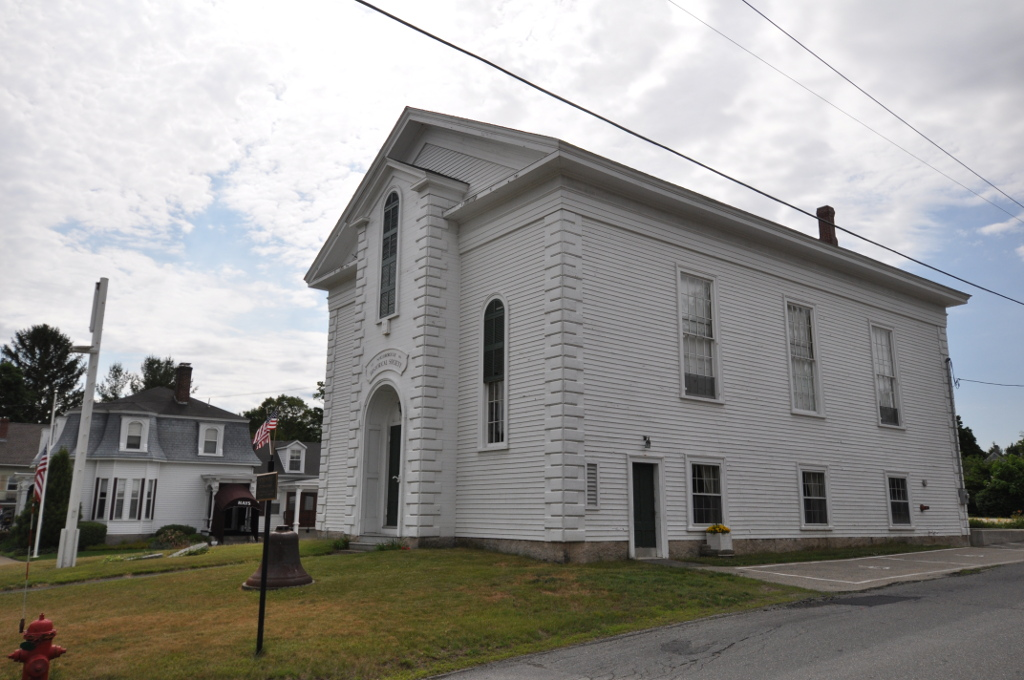
- The former church building in 2016

- Location within Massachusetts Location within the United States
- Nearest city: 52 Main Street, Northborough, Massachusetts
- Coordinates: 42°19′11″N 71°38′19″W
- Built: 1860
- Architect: Newton, Richard W.
- Architectural style: Italianate
- NRHP reference No.: 16000157
- Added to NRHP: April 12, 2016

The First Baptist Church of Northborough is a historic former church building at 52 Main Street. It is presently home to the Northborough Historical Society offices and museum. Built in 1860, it is a good local example of religious Italianate architecture, despite having lost its tower in the New England Hurricane of 1938. The building was listed on the National Register of Historic Places in 2016.

== Description and history ==
The former First Baptist Church stands in Northborough's town center, at the southeast corner of Main and School Streets. It is a 1 1/2-story wood-frame structure, with a gabled roof and clapboard siding. The building's corners are quoined, and an entablature encircles the building below the gables. Its front facade is three bays wide, the center one projecting forward and upward into the pedimented gable. The flanking bays have narrow round-arch windows, with a similar one above the recessed entry in the projecting central section. The sides are also three bays, with long rectangular sash windows.

The church was built in 1860 for a Baptist congregation formed in 1827. It was their second sanctuary, the congregation having outgrown the first, this building was constructed on the site of the first one. A series of horse sheds were added at the rear in 1837, and were later adapted to house automobiles. The church's original steeple was blown off by the New England Hurricane of 1938, and was not rebuilt. The congregation having declined in size, it merged in 1948 with an Evangelical congregation to form Trinity Chapel. This building was put up for sale by the congregation in 1959, and was acquired by the historical society the following year.

== See also ==
- National Register of Historic Places listings in Worcester County, Massachusetts
