= East Blackstone Village Historic District =

Historic district in Massachusetts, United States

- U.S. National Register of Historic Places
- U.S. Historic district
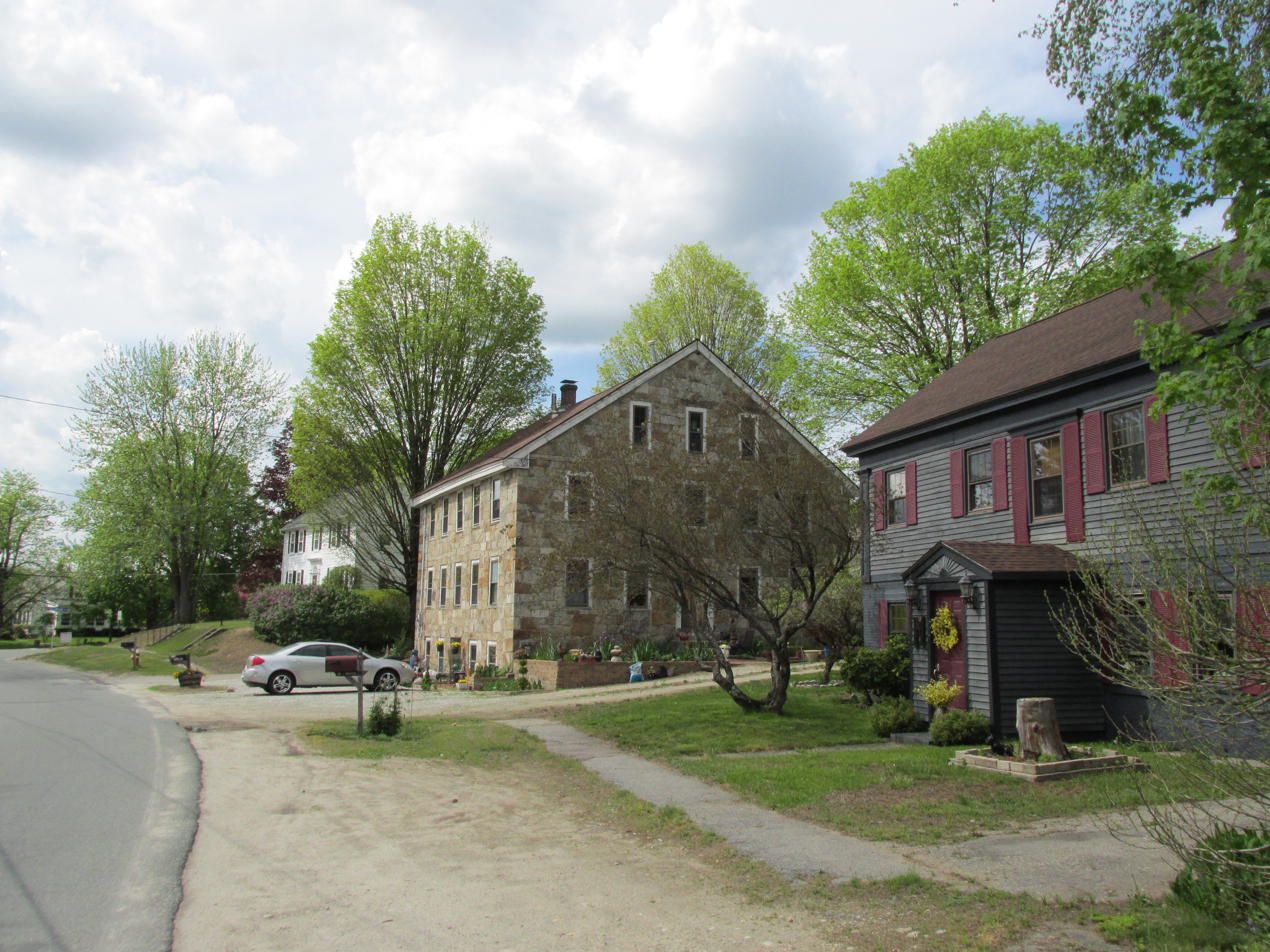
- Along Elm Street

- Location within Massachusetts Location within the United States
- Location: Blackstone, Massachusetts
- Coordinates: 42°2′39″N 71°30′57″W
- Architectural style: Georgian, Greek Revival, Late Victorian
- NRHP reference No.: 95001040
- Added to NRHP: September 6, 1995

The East Blackstone Village Historic District is a historic district roughly along Elm Street at the junction with Summer Street in eastern Blackstone, Massachusetts. It encompasses a small 19th-century mill village center that developed along what was once a major roadway connecting Worcester with Providence, Rhode Island. The district was added to the National Register of Historic Places in 1995.

== Setting ==
East Blackstone village is centered on the junction of Elm and Summer Streets in Blackstone, a community in southeastern Worcester County and abutting Rhode Island to the south. Elm Street is the historic major route connecting Worcester to the northwest with Providence to the southeast. The Mill River flows roughly parallel to the road to its southwest, and its waters provided the power for the villages early industries, a grist mill (1753) and a saw mill (1760), at a point where the river passes under Elm Street west of Summer on a c. 1850 stone arch bridge known as Kelly's Bridge. Only archaeological and foundational remnants survive of the mills at this site. Although this area is separated from the center of the village, it is included in the historic district because of its early importance in the later development of the village.

== Architecture ==
The district includes fourteen residential buildings, a school, and a former retail building, as well as a number of archaeological resources. Most of them are located on the south side of Elm Street, west of the Summer Street junction, or on Summer Street to the south. The oldest building is the c. 1760 Seth Kelly House (174 Elm Street), with most of the other buildings dating to the first half of the 19th century. The majority of the houses are either Greek Revival or Federal style in their architecture, although later Italianate buildings are also present. One house, the Lyman Paine House at 116 Elm, is an 1850s that was modified in the 1870s by the addition of a then-fashionable mansard roof. The school building, a c. 1830 brick building (one of very few in Blackstone), has been converted into a residence. The Stone Store is one of only three 19th-century stone buildings in the town; it is a three-story structure fashioned out of coursed buff-colored stone.

== See also ==
- National Register of Historic Places listings in Worcester County, Massachusetts
