= South Union School =

Historic building in Massachusetts, United States

- U.S. National Register of Historic Places
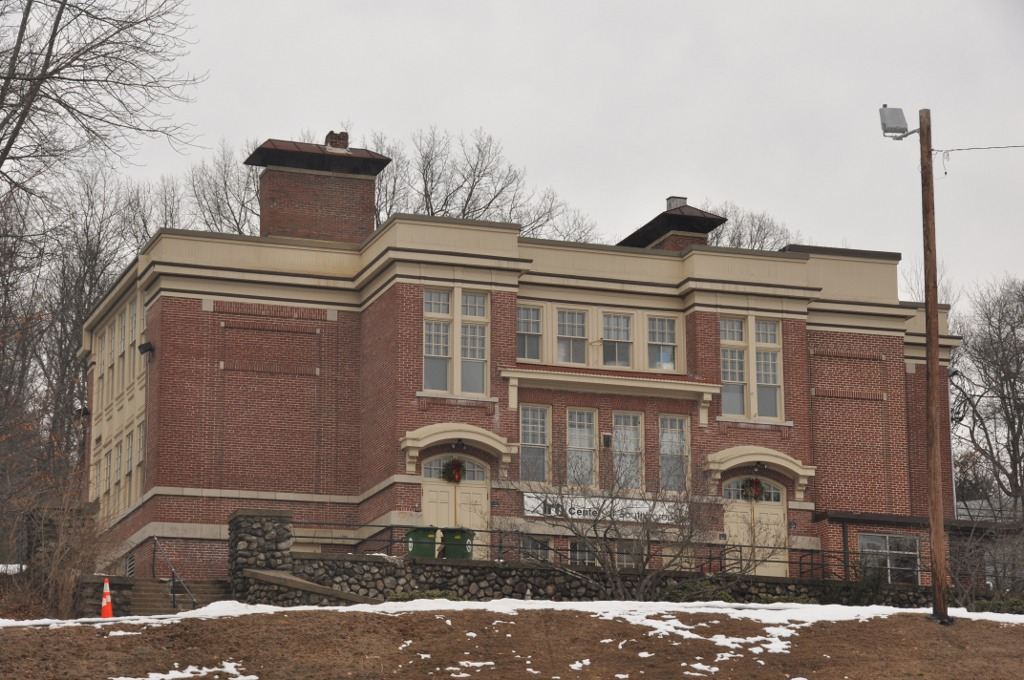

- Location within Massachusetts Location within the United States
- Location: 21 Highland Street, Southborough, Massachusetts
- Coordinates: 42°16′05″N 71°31′49″W
- Built: 1912
- NRHP reference No.: 11000021
- Added to NRHP: February 18, 2011

The South Union School is an historic school building at 21 Highland Street in Southborough, Massachusetts. The two story brick, cast stone, and wood Classical Revival building was designed by Frank Irving Cooper of the Boston architectural firm of Cooper & Bailey, and built 1911–12. It is architecturally structured somewhat like a classical column: an elevated basement level, topped by a water table, constitutes the base of the column, the two main floors resemble the body of the column, and the building's cornice and parapet resemble its capital. The school was built to consolidate the schooling of the town's elementary school students from the nearby Cordaville and Southville villages, as part of a series of construction projects to modernize the town's public facilities. It underwent major renovation in the 1950s to improve its infrastructure, including the construction of a cafeteria in the basement, before closing in the early 1970s. It was shortly afterward reopened to serve the town's kindergarten population, which it served until 1980. In 1981 the building was repurposed to become the home of the Southborough Arts Center.

The building was listed on the National Register of Historic Places in 2011.

== See also ==
- National Register of Historic Places listings in Worcester County, Massachusetts
