= Four Corners–Goodnow Farm Historic District =

Historic district in Massachusetts, United States

- U.S. National Register of Historic Places
- U.S. Historic district
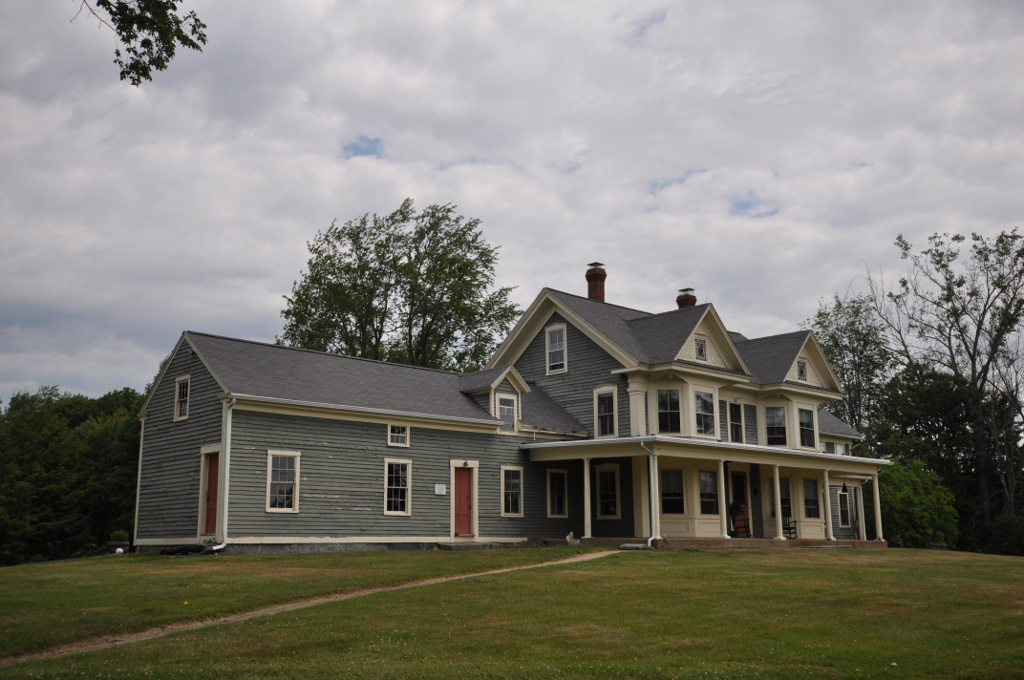

- Location within Massachusetts Location within the United States
- Location: Gates, Goodnow, Old Colony, Rhodes & Thompson Rds., Princeton, Massachusetts
- Coordinates: 42°27′43″N 71°55′47″W
- Area: 620 acres (250 ha)
- NRHP reference No.: 15000510
- Added to NRHP: August 10, 2015

The Four Corners–Goodnow Farm Historic District of Princeton, Massachusetts encompasses a rural agricultural area with well-preserved buildings dating from the 18th to 20th centuries. It is located in the western part of the town, and is centered on the junction of Old Colony, Gates, and Thompson Roads. The district was listed on the National Register of Historic Places in 2015.

== Description ==
The town of Princeton was settled in the mid-18th century. The main east-west road through the district, designated Thompson Road east of the central junction and Old Colony Road to its west, was laid out along an old Native American path, and was known from an early time as the County Road. Gates Road, serving the local area, was laid out in the 1760s. The oldest farmstead in the district, that of Jedediah Brigham, was established in the 1740s, and much of it remains with the descendants of its original settlers. Its core portion, including the surviving house, is one of the oldest farms in Princeton.

The house at 114 Gates Road was built in 1761 by Isaac Thompson, whose landholdings were to the intersection's northwest. The area has remained predominantly agricultural during industrialization to a lack of usable water power, and the laying of railroads was limited to a line running east-west to the south of the district. Only a few modest homes have been built in the area since 1950, and most of the other houses date to the mid-19th century or earlier. Most of the land use remains in traditional patterns of open fields and wooded areas.

== See also ==
- National Register of Historic Places listings in Worcester County, Massachusetts
