= Spaulding Block =

- U.S. National Register of Historic Places
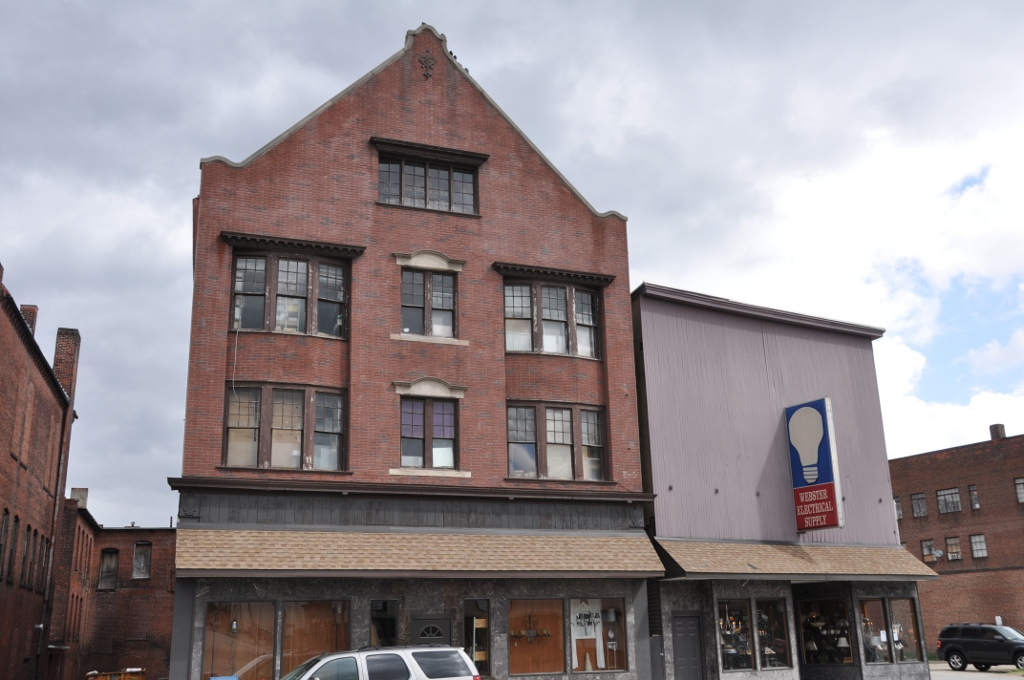

- Location within Massachusetts Location within the United States
- Location: 141–143 Main Street, Webster, Massachusetts
- Coordinates: 42°2′56″N 71°53′5″W
- Built: 1866
- Architectural style: Italianate
- NRHP reference No.: 80000466
- Added to NRHP: December 3, 1980

The Spaulding Block is a historic commercial building in Webster, Massachusetts. One of the oldest commercial buildings in Webster, this three story brick building was built in 1866 by Cyrus Spaulding, and housed his hardware store. The Webster Times was also an early occupant, after its previous home was burned out. The building underwent a major renovation in 1897, receiving a new facade with Tudor styling.

The block was listed on the National Register of Historic Places in 1980.

== See also ==
- National Register of Historic Places listings in Worcester County, Massachusetts
