= Chestnut Hill Meetinghouse =

Historic church in Massachusetts, United States

- U.S. National Register of Historic Places
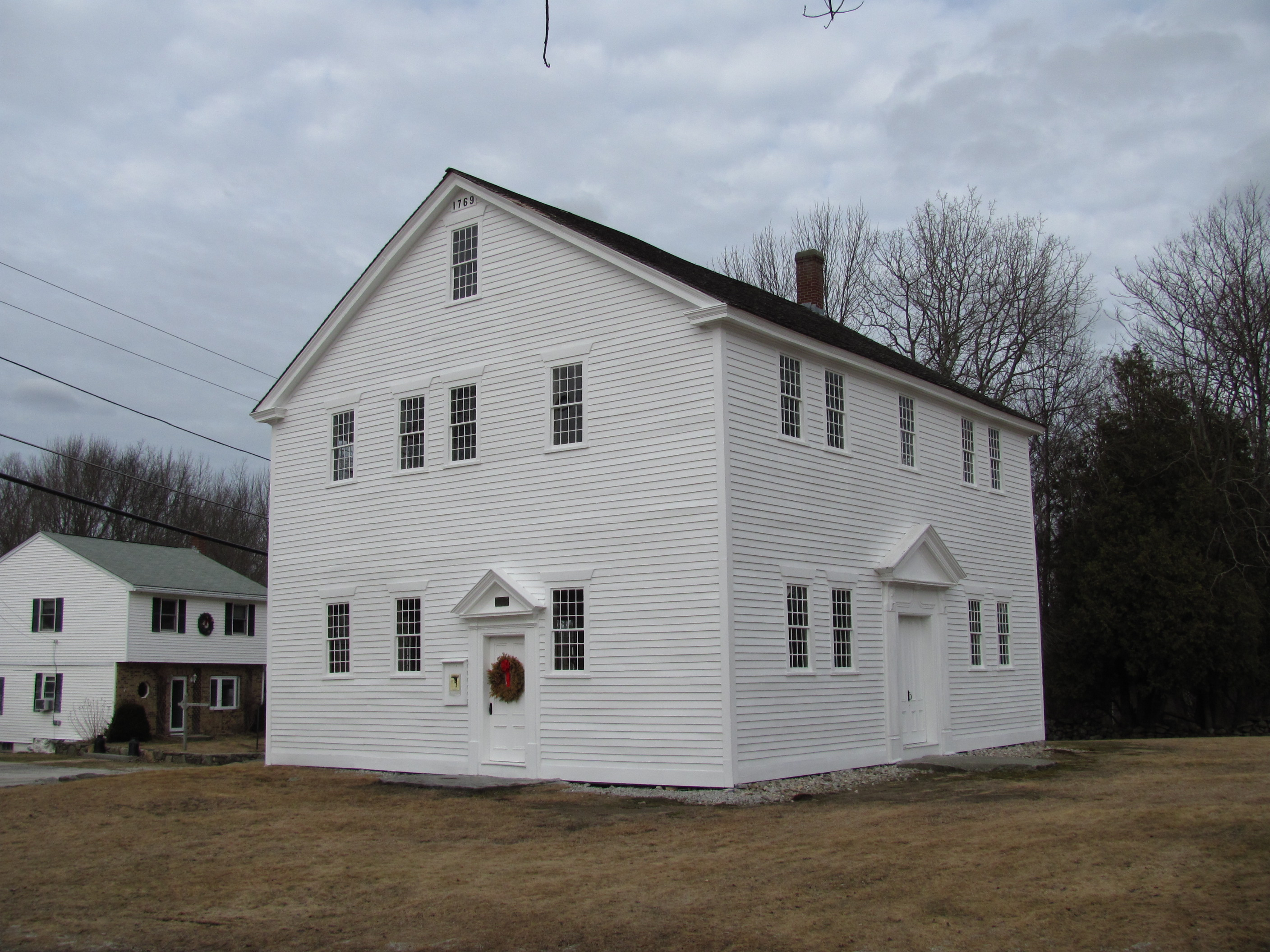
- Chestnut Hill Meetinghouse

- Location within Massachusetts Location within the United States
- Nearest city: Millville, Massachusetts
- Coordinates: 42°2′27″N 71°34′58″W
- Built: 1769
- Architectural style: Georgian
- NRHP reference No.: 84000434
- Added to NRHP: November 13, 1984

The Chestnut Hill Meetinghouse (also known as South Parish Meeting House) is an historic meeting house at the corner of Chestnut and Thayer Streets in Millville, Massachusetts. The 2 1/2-story wood frame meetinghouse was built in 1769. It is very plainly decorated, with only its door surrounds of architectural interest. They consist of pilasters flanking the door, which is topped by a full triangular pediment. The interior consists of a large meeting chamber, in which stand 26 box pews. The building served as the meeting place of South Parish into the nineteenth century, and is one of a small number of surviving 18th-century meetinghouses whose main entrance is on the long side of the building. It is purported to be the first place of worship that the first utterance for the independence of this country was announced publicly.

The building was added to the National Register of Historic Places in 1984.

== See also ==
- National Register of Historic Places listings in Worcester County, Massachusetts
