= District No. 4 School (Petersham, Massachusetts) =

- U.S. National Register of Historic Places
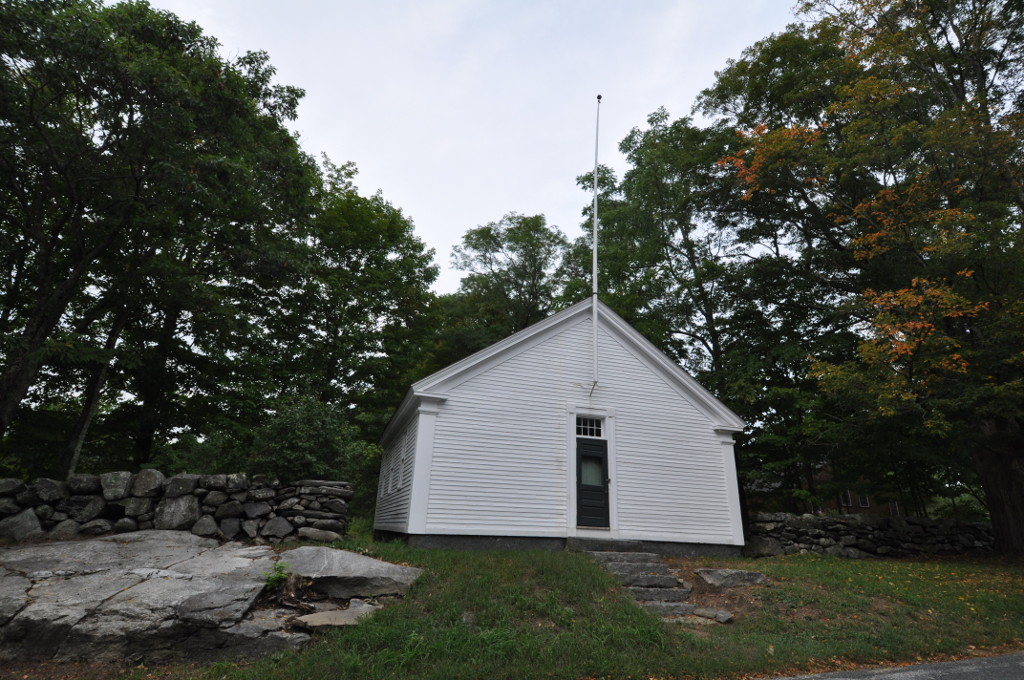
- District No. 4 School

- Location within Massachusetts Location within the United States
- Location: 191 East Road, Petersham, Massachusetts
- Coordinates: 42°29′18″N 72°9′10″W
- Area: less than one acre
- Built: 1846
- NRHP reference No.: 16000713
- Added to NRHP: October 11, 2016

The District No. 4 School, also known as the First East School or Ledgeville School, is an historic school building at 191 East Road in Petersham, Massachusetts. Built in 1846, it is one of the town's older surviving district school buildings, and now serves as a local community hall. It was listed on the National Register of Historic Places in 2016.

== Description and history ==
The District No. 4 School is located in a rural area of eastern Petersham, on the north side of East Road a short way west of its junction with Quaker Drive. It is a single-story wood frame structure, with a gable roof, clapboarded exterior, and a stone foundation. The street-facing facade houses a single door, which provides access to the building. The side walls each have three windows. Trim consists of simple pilasters at the corners, and an entry surround with pilasters, transom window, and paneled entablature. A vertically oriented flagpole is attached above the door.

The town of Petersham, incorporated in 1754, established a district school system consisting of thirteen districts. The present district 4 schoolhouse was built in 1846, and is one of three school buildings from the 1840s to survive in the town. It was built on a site that had a schoolhouse on it since at least 1788, and was formally deeded to the local district in 1800. The present school was built as a replacement of a building constructed in 1803. District schools were formally abolished in Massachusetts in 1866, but this school remained open until 1943, the last in the town to be closed. The school building had a long history of use for local community functions, which continued after its educational functions ended. It is now managed by the Ledgeville Association as a community resource.

== See also ==
- National Register of Historic Places listings in Worcester County, Massachusetts
