= Stephen Hastings House =

Historic house in Massachusetts, United States

- U.S. National Register of Historic Places
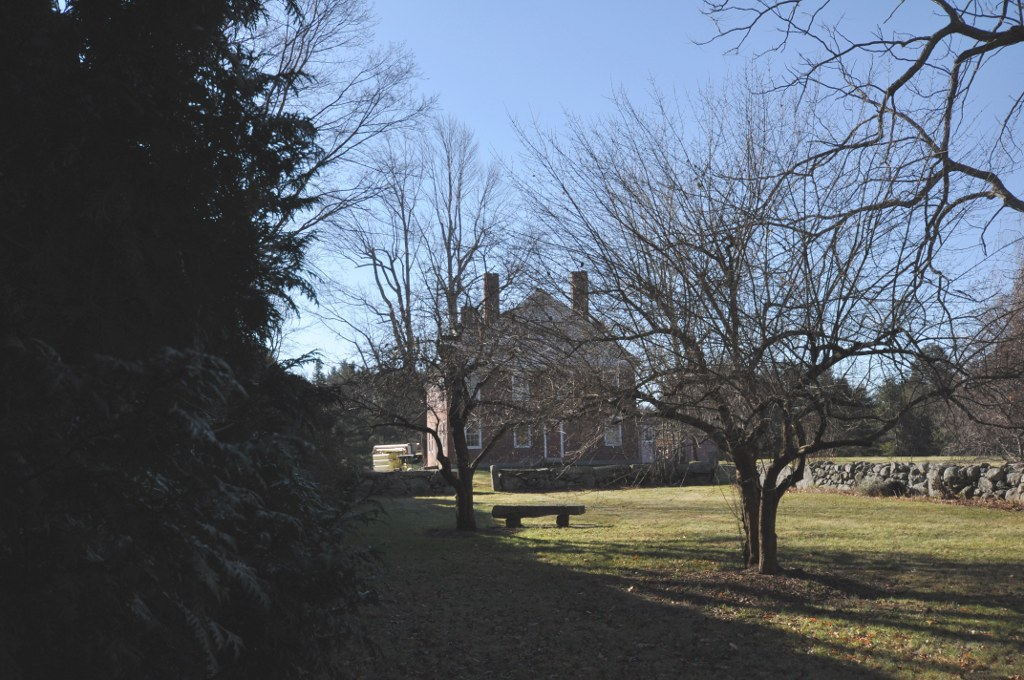

- Location within Massachusetts Location within the United States
- Location: Sterling, Massachusetts
- Coordinates: 42°24′29″N 71°44′26″W
- Area: 7.2 acres (2.9 ha)
- Built: 1794
- Architectural style: Federal
- NRHP reference No.: 05001363
- Added to NRHP: December 6, 2005

The Stephen Hastings House is a historic house at 20 Squareshire Road in Sterling, Massachusetts. Built in 1794, this 2 1/2-story house is believed to be the earliest brick house built in what is now Sterling. The brick is laid in Flemish bond on the front facade, and in English bond on the other three sides, and there are four large end-wall chimneys. A kitchen ell, dating to the 20th century, extends from the rear of the house. Most of its styling (both interior and exterior) is Federal, although some Greek Revival styling was added in the 19th century.

The house was listed on the National Register of Historic Places in 2005.

== See also ==
- National Register of Historic Places listings in Worcester County, Massachusetts
