= Eagleville Historic District =

Historic district in Massachusetts, United States

- U.S. National Register of Historic Places
- U.S. Historic district
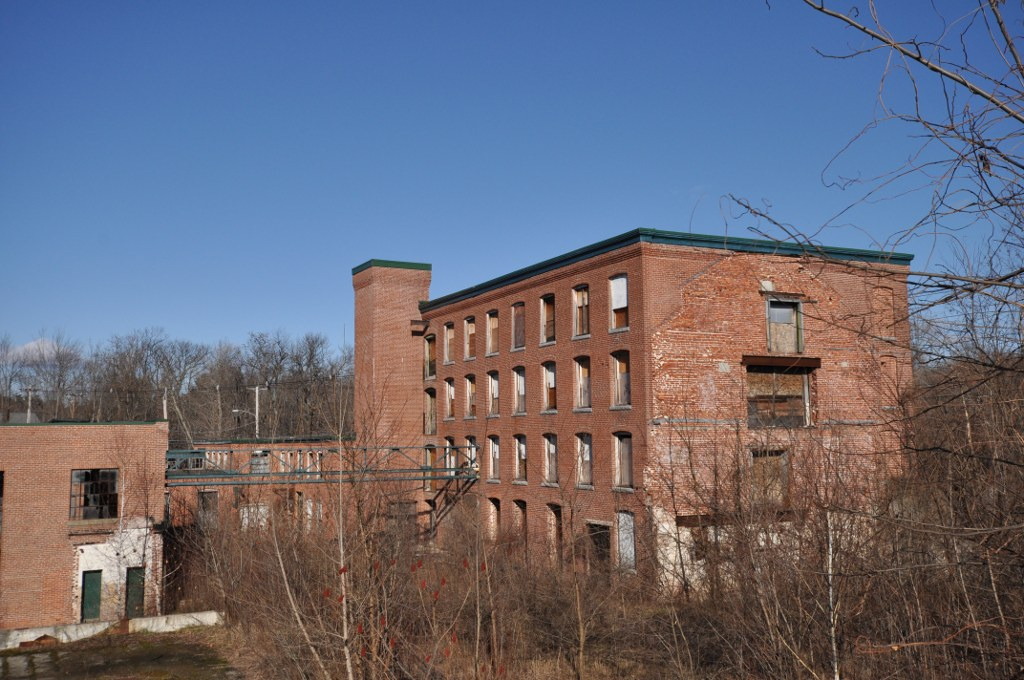

- Location within Massachusetts Location within the United States
- Location: Main St., Princeton St., High St, Holden, Massachusetts
- Coordinates: 42.36051°N 71.88306°W
- Area: 17.85 acres (7.22 ha)
- Built: 1806
- NRHP reference No.: 10000786
- Added to NRHP: September 24, 2010

The Eagleville Historic District encompasses a historic mill village in northwestern Holden, Massachusetts. The area, now part of the village of Jefferson, was developed beginning early in the 19th century, although no industrial structures from that period survive. The main dam and mill complex that now stand there were built c. 1850, and extended or modified into the early 20th century. The village also includes significant tracts of surviving mill worker housing.

The district was listed on the National Register of Historic Places in 2010.

== See also ==
- National Register of Historic Places listings in Worcester County, Massachusetts
