= National Register of Historic Places listings in Worcester County, Massachusetts =

Location of Worcester County in Massachusetts

This is a list of the National Register of Historic Places (NRHP) designated in Worcester County, Massachusetts. The locations of NRHP properties and districts for which the latitude and longitude coordinates are included below, may be seen in a map.

Contents: Counties in Massachusetts

Barnstable | Berkshire | Bristol | Dukes | Essex | Franklin | Hampden | Hampshire | Middlesex | Nantucket | Norfolk | Plymouth | Suffolk | Worcester

This National Park Service list is complete through NPS recent listings posted September 4, 2026.

== Cities and towns listed separately ==
The following Worcester County cities and towns have large numbers of sites listed in the National Register of Historic Places. Lists of their sites are on separate pages, linked below.

Community	Image	First date listed	Last date listed	Count
Northern Worcester County		December 30, 1970	July 22, 2026	82
Southbridge		September 7, 1979	May 3, 2023	85
Uxbridge		November 23, 1971	January 20, 1984	53
Eastern Worcester		April 7, 1971	July 3, 2017	98
Northwestern Worcester		November 24, 1968	May 27, 2022	112
Southwestern Worcester		March 5, 1980	May 20, 2024	82

== Other cities and towns in central and southern Worcester County ==
	Name on the Register	Image	Date listed	Location	City or town	Description
1	1767 Milestones	1767 Milestones	April 7, 1971 (#71000084)	Between Boston and Springfield along the old Upper Boston Post Road. 42°17′35″N 71°44′58″W	Brookfield, East Brookfield, Leicester, Northborough, Shrewsbury, Spencer, Warren, and West Brookfield	Also includes markers located in Worcester, as well as Hampden, Middlesex, Norfolk, and Suffolk Counties.
2	Nathan C. Aldrich House and Resthaven Chapel	Nathan C. Aldrich House and Resthaven Chapel	May 17, 2006 (#06000399)	111 Providence St. 42°05′13″N 71°31′57″W	Mendon	
3	Ethan Allen House and Gun Shop	Ethan Allen House and Gun Shop	October 12, 1995 (#95001167)	37 Waterville St. 42°14′14″N 71°42′23″W	Grafton	
4	Bancroft Memorial Library	Bancroft Memorial Library	February 12, 1999 (#99000188)	50 Hopedale St. 42°07′49″N 71°32′30″W	Hopedale	
5	Barlin Acres	Barlin Acres	November 26, 1982 (#82000487)	284 School St. 42°20′04″N 71°43′22″W	Boylston	Now occupied by a golf course.
6	Barnes-Hill House	Barnes-Hill House	January 26, 2016 (#15001007)	12 N. Brookfield Rd. 42°15′41″N 72°00′50″W	Spencer	
7	Barre Common District	Barre Common District	May 4, 1976 (#76000298)	Bounded roughly by South, Exchange, Main, Pleasant, Broad, School and Grove Sts. 42°25′20″N 72°06′20″W	Barre	
8	Bartlett's Bridge	Bartlett's Bridge	February 10, 2000 (#00000077)	Clara Barton Rd. over the French River; 42°09′17″N 71°52′59″W	Oxford	
9	Clara Barton Homestead	Clara Barton Homestead	September 22, 1977 (#77000202)	3 mi (4.8 km) west of Oxford on Clara Barton Rd. 42°09′12″N 71°53′45″W	Oxford	
10	Beaman Memorial Public Library	Beaman Memorial Public Library	May 16, 2016 (#16000251)	8 Newton St. 42°21′54″N 71°46′59″W	West Boylston	
11	Berlin Town Hall	Berlin Town Hall	September 15, 2011 (#11000663)	12 Woodward Ave. 42°22′55″N 71°38′13″W	Berlin	
12	Bigelow Carpet Company Woolen Mills	Bigelow Carpet Company Woolen Mills	October 6, 1983 (#83004107)	Main St. 42°25′01″N 71°41′26″W	Clinton	
13	Bigelow Carpet Mill	Bigelow Carpet Mill	December 22, 1978 (#78000467)	Union and High Sts. 42°24′55″N 71°41′10″W	Clinton	
14	Bigelow Tavern Historic District	Bigelow Tavern Historic District	September 24, 1992 (#92000043)	60, 64 and 65 Worcester St. 42°21′55″N 71°46′55″W	West Boylston	
15	Black Tavern	Black Tavern	May 9, 1985 (#85000981)	140, 142 Dudley Center Rd. 42°02′45″N 71°55′47″W	Dudley	
16	Blackstone Canal Historic District	Blackstone Canal Historic District	August 15, 1995 (#73000328)	Blackstone to Worcester, Massachusetts; 41°56′30″N 71°27′50″W	Blackstone, Grafton, Millbury, Millville, Northbridge, and Sutton	Initial listing was for 3.5 mile section of canal in Northbridge and Uxbridge; expanded to include entire length in Massachusetts in 1995 (#95001004).
17	Blackstone Manufacturing Company Historic District	Blackstone Manufacturing Company Historic District	August 25, 1995 (#95001038)	Roughly the area surrounding Butler, Canal, Church, County, Ives, Main, Mendon, Old Mendon, and School Sts. 42°00′58″N 71°32′41″W	Blackstone	
18	Blackstone Viaduct	Blackstone Viaduct	February 5, 2002 (#01001558)	Canal, Farnum and Mill Sts. 42°00′55″N 71°32′00″W	Blackstone	
19	Bolton Center Historic District	Bolton Center Historic District	November 17, 1997 (#97001296)	Roughly along Main St. between Harvard Rd. and Interstate 495; 42°26′07″N 71°36′35″W	Bolton	
20	Bowers School	Bowers School	November 10, 1983 (#83004108)	411 Water St. 42°25′09″N 71°40′18″W	Clinton	
21	J.D.C. Bradley House	J.D.C. Bradley House	February 26, 1999 (#99000260)	5 Sadie Hutt Lane; 42°18′59″N 71°32′34″W	Southborough	Register listing is at 60 Sears Rd.
22	Brookfield Cemetery	Brookfield Cemetery	May 9, 2003 (#03000384)	Main St. 42°13′02″N 72°06′49″W	Brookfield	
23	Brookfield Common Historic District	Brookfield Common Historic District	February 23, 1990 (#90000161)	Roughly Howard, Sherman, Prouty, W. Main, Main, and Upper River Sts. 42°12′51″N 72°06′09″W	Brookfield	
24	Brown-Davis-Frost Farm	Brown-Davis-Frost Farm	December 13, 1995 (#95001444)	17 Whitney St. 42°22′29″N 71°53′19″W	Jefferson	
25	Bullard House	Bullard House	September 15, 2011 (#11000664)	4 Woodward Ave. 42°22′54″N 71°38′14″W	Berlin	
26	Camp Atwater	Camp Atwater	April 15, 1982 (#82004477)	Shore Rd. 42°14′22″N 72°03′00″W	North Brookfield	
27	Cedar Swamp Archeological District	Cedar Swamp Archeological District	May 23, 1988 (#88000587)	Along the border with Hopkinton in Middlesex County; 42°15′36″N 71°35′06″W	Westborough	Extends into Hopkinton, Middlesex County
28	Central Street Historic District	Central Street Historic District	June 20, 2003 (#03000550)	Roughly bounded by Central, Quaker, West, Chesley, Bow, Prospect, and Fletcher Sts. 42°01′29″N 71°34′57″W	Millville	
29	Charlton Center Historic District	Charlton Center Historic District	October 20, 1995 (#95001227)	Roughly Main St. from Mugget Hill Rd. to Masonic Home Rd. and adjacent roads 42°08′02″N 71°58′09″W	Charlton	
30	Chestnut Hill Meetinghouse	Chestnut Hill Meetinghouse	November 13, 1984 (#84000434)	Chestnut and Thayer Sts. 42°02′27″N 71°34′58″W	Millville	
31	George Clapp House	George Clapp House	August 21, 1997 (#97000919)	44 North St. 42°12′43″N 71°40′51″W	Grafton	
32	Clinton Wire Cloth Company Historic District		May 7, 2024 (#100010280)	55-104 Sterling Street; 10, 19, and 89 Parker Street; 42°25′17″N 71°41′21″W	Clinton	
33	Olney Cook Artisan Shop	Olney Cook Artisan Shop	December 2, 2019 (#100004699)	54 Hartford Ave. E. 42°05′41″N 71°31′24″W	Mendon	
34	Corcoran School	Corcoran School	February 4, 2000 (#00000039)	40 Walnut St. 42°25′00″N 71°41′03″W	Clinton	
35	Crossman Bridge	Crossman Bridge	December 27, 2010 (#10001065)	Gilbert Rd. over Quaboag River; 42°12′37″N 72°14′44″W	Warren	
36	Dana Common Historic and Archaeological District	Dana Common Historic and Archaeological District	March 4, 2013 (#13000052)	Gate 40 off Hardwick Rd. 42°26′57″N 72°12′24″W	Petersham	
37	District Five Schoolhouse	District Five Schoolhouse	June 5, 1991 (#91000697)	School St. between Boyden and 1st Sts. 42°02′34″N 71°52′58″W	Webster	Now houses the Dudley-Webster Historical Society.
38	District No. 4 School	District No. 4 School	October 11, 2016 (#16000713)	191 East St. 42°29′18″N 72°09′10″W	Petersham	
39	District No. 5 School	District No. 5 School	July 18, 2016 (#16000455)	311 East St. 42°29′06″N 72°07′59″W	Petersham	
40	District No. 5 School	District No. 5 School	August 27, 2013 (#13000622)	2 Old Mill Rd. 42°17′29″N 71°44′29″W	Shrewsbury	
41	Downtown Clinton Historic District	Downtown Clinton Historic District	February 21, 1985 (#85000319)	Roughly bounded by Union and Prospects Sts. on High and Church Sts. 42°25′02″N 71°40′59″W	Clinton	
42	Dudley Hill Historic District	Dudley Hill Historic District	December 2, 2019 (#100004707)	Center, Dudley Oxford Rd., Dudley Southbridge, Ramshorn & Tanyard Rds. 42°02′49″N 71°55′45″W	Dudley	
43	Eagleville Historic District	Eagleville Historic District	September 24, 2010 (#10000786)	Main St., Princeton St., High St; 42°21′35″N 71°52′55″W	Holden	
44	East Blackstone Friends Meetinghouse	East Blackstone Friends Meetinghouse	August 22, 1995 (#95001035)	197 Elm St. 42°03′09″N 71°31′23″W	Blackstone	
45	East Blackstone Village Historic District	East Blackstone Village Historic District	September 6, 1995 (#95001040)	Roughly the area along Elm St. at the junction with Summer St. 42°02′39″N 71°30′57″W	Blackstone	
46	East End Historic District		April 1, 2025 (#100011582)	0 Anderson Purchase, 3 and 19 East End Road, 115-220 Main Street; 42°26′22″N 71°33′51″W	Bolton	
47	East Princeton Village Historic District	East Princeton Village Historic District	March 18, 2004 (#04000188)	Roughly Main St. and Leominster Rd. 42°28′23″N 71°50′14″W	Princeton	
48	Eastwood Cemetery		May 7, 2024 (#100010282)	Old Common-Wilder Road; 42°26′27″N 71°39′19″W	Bolton	Extends into Lancaster.
49	Eddy Block	Eddy Block	December 3, 1980 (#80000470)	119-131 Main St. and 4 Davis St. 42°02′56″N 71°53′05″W	Webster	
50	Elm Hill Farm Historic District	Elm Hill Farm Historic District	May 16, 1991 (#91000600)	E. Main St. east of its junction with Brookfield Rd. 42°13′16″N 72°05′10″W	Brookfield	
51	Farnum's Gate Historic District	Farnum's Gate Historic District	August 25, 1995 (#95001039)	Roughly the area surrounding the junction of Main and Blackstone Sts. 42°01′08″N 71°31′56″W	Blackstone	
52	Farnumsville Historic District	Farnumsville Historic District	February 16, 1996 (#96000052)	Roughly bounded by Providence Rd., Cross, Main, Harding and Depot Sts. and Maple Ave. 42°10′28″N 71°41′03″W	Grafton	
53	Fernside-Vacation House for Working Girls	Fernside-Vacation House for Working Girls	June 27, 2002 (#02000695)	162 Mountain Rd. 42°28′06″N 71°53′04″W	Princeton	
54	First Baptist Church of Northborough	First Baptist Church of Northborough	April 12, 2016 (#16000157)	52 Main St. 42°19′11″N 71°38′19″W	Northborough	
55	First Methodist Church	First Methodist Church	November 2, 1990 (#90001720)	75 Walnut St. 42°25′00″N 71°41′03″W	Clinton	
56	First Presbyterian Society Meeting House	First Presbyterian Society Meeting House	September 9, 2010 (#10000722)	20 Main St. 42°11′32″N 71°45′37″W	Millbury	
57	Nathan Fisher House	Nathan Fisher House	March 25, 1980 (#80001679)	34 West Main St. 42°17′03″N 71°37′30″W	Westborough	
58	Fisherville Historic District	Fisherville Historic District	February 16, 1996 (#96000056)	Roughly bounded by Main, Elmwood, Ferry and Sampson Sts. 42°10′37″N 71°41′40″W	Grafton	
59	Fobes-O'Donnell House	Fobes-O'Donnell House	March 7, 2018 (#100002197)	1221 Old Turnpike Rd., 42°22′03″N 72°04′08″W	Oakham	
60	Jedediah Foster Homesite	Jedediah Foster Homesite	August 27, 2013 (#13000623)	Foster Hill Rd., 42°13′55″N 72°07′40″W	West Brookfield	
61	Four Corners-Goodnow Farm Historic District	Four Corners-Goodnow Farm Historic District	August 10, 2015 (#15000510)	Gates, Goodnow, Old Colony, Rhodes & Thompson Rds. 42°27′43″N 71°55′47″W	Princeton	
62	Freegrace Marble Farm Historic District	Freegrace Marble Farm Historic District	November 13, 1989 (#89001967)	80 Burbank Rd. 42°09′44″N 71°45′02″W	Sutton	
63	Gay Farm	Gay Farm	September 22, 1977 (#77000201)	South of Petersham off Nichewaug Rd. 42°27′50″N 72°11′06″W	Petersham	
64	Rev. Samuel Gay House	Rev. Samuel Gay House	November 24, 1997 (#97001450)	10 Williamsville Rd. 42°28′44″N 72°00′55″W	Hubbardston	
65	Gilbertville Historic District	Gilbertville Historic District	December 26, 1991 (#91001848)	Roughly Main, Church, High, North, Broad and Bridge Sts. 42°18′24″N 72°12′32″W	Hardwick	
66	Gillon Block	Gillon Block	October 21, 1982 (#82000488)	189 Main St. 42°08′26″N 71°31′15″W	Milford	
67	Goddard Rocket Launching Site	Goddard Rocket Launching Site	November 13, 1966 (#66000654)	Ninth fairway, Pakachoag Golf Course, Pakachoag Rd. 42°13′06″N 71°48′46″W	Auburn	National Historic Landmark
68	John B. Gough House	John B. Gough House	March 19, 1974 (#74001763)	215 Main St. 42°19′42″N 71°45′22″W	Boylston	National Historic Landmark
69	Grafton Common Historic District	Grafton Common Historic District	June 22, 1988 (#88000707)	Roughly Worcester, Oak, Millbury, Church, South, Upton, and North Sts. 42°12′22″N 71°41′10″W	Grafton	
70	Grafton Inn	Grafton Inn	June 16, 1980 (#80001675)	25 Central Sq. 42°12′23″N 71°41′08″W	Grafton	
71	Grove Street School	Grove Street School	July 5, 1996 (#96000737)	23 Grove St. 42°14′48″N 71°59′34″W	Spencer	
72	Hardwick Village Historic District	Hardwick Village Historic District	December 19, 1991 (#91001849)	Petersham, Barre, Greenwich, Ruggles Hill and Gilbertville Rds. 42°20′54″N 72°11′49″W	Hardwick	
73	Hassanamisco Reservation	Hassanamisco Reservation	September 6, 2011 (#11000615)	80 Brigham Hill Rd. 42°12′39″N 71°42′18″W	Grafton	
74	Stephen Hastings House	Stephen Hastings House	December 6, 2005 (#05001363)	20 Squareshire Rd. 42°24′29″N 71°44′26″W	Sterling	
75	Hayward Mill	Hayward Mill	June 17, 1991 (#91000695)	Junction of North and Cook Sts., on the Mumford River; 42°04′30″N 71°42′43″W	Douglas	
76	Daniel Holbrook Sr. House		May 11, 2026 (#100012997)	35 Whitney Street; 42°19′24″N 71°38′39″W	Northborough	
77	Holden Center Historic District	Holden Center Historic District	December 22, 1977 (#77000194)	Main, Maple, Highland, and Reservoir Sts. 42°21′03″N 71°51′47″W	Holden	
78	Holland-Towne House	Holland-Towne House	August 13, 1990 (#89002327)	North Street; 42°30′01″N 72°11′06″W	Petersham	
79	Hopedale Village Historic District	Hopedale Village Historic District	June 12, 2002 (#02000635)	Roughly bounded by Milford Town Line, Malquin Dr., Mendon Town Line and Upton Town Line; 42°07′35″N 71°32′12″W	Hopedale	
80	Hubbard-Dawson House	Hubbard-Dawson House	December 13, 1995 (#95001443)	925 Main St. 42°20′37″N 71°51′08″W	Holden	
81	Hubbardston Public Library	Hubbardston Public Library	August 19, 1998 (#98000989)	7 Main St. 42°28′30″N 72°00′28″W	Hubbardston	
82	Hubbardston Town Common Historic District	Hubbardston Town Common Historic District	November 22, 2000 (#00001396)	Main and Brigham Sts. 42°28′30″N 72°00′22″W	Hubbardston	
83	Hudson House	Hudson House	February 8, 1978 (#78000480)	Northeast of Oxford on Hudson Rd. 42°08′32″N 71°50′12″W	Oxford	
84	Huguenot Fort	Huguenot Fort	April 27, 1988 (#88000424)	Fort Hill Rd. 42°05′55″N 71°50′50″W	Oxford	
85	E. N. Jenckes Store	E. N. Jenckes Store	January 28, 1988 (#87002558)	Main St. 42°04′18″N 71°42′51″W	Douglas	
86	Knowlton Hat Factory	Knowlton Hat Factory	June 1, 1982 (#82004467)	134 Main St. 42°10′10″N 71°37′27″W	Upton	
87	Lancaster Mills	Lancaster Mills	January 29, 2010 (#10000005)	1-55, 75, 99, 1-R Green St., 20 Cameron St. 42°24′42″N 71°40′48″W	Clinton	
88	Linwood Historic District	Linwood Historic District	June 16, 1989 (#88002753)	Roughly Linwood Ave., Maple Ct., and Pine Ct. 42°05′54″N 71°38′49″W	Northbridge	
89	Joseph Lothrop House	Joseph Lothrop House	March 27, 1980 (#80001680)	208 Turnpike Rd. 42°17′01″N 71°37′34″W	Westborough	Listed in the "Shrewsbury vicinity".
90	Lyman School for Boys	Lyman School for Boys	July 25, 1994 (#94000693)	Junction of Oak and South Sts. 42°17′24″N 71°37′50″W	Westborough	
91	Main Street Historic District	Main Street Historic District	May 10, 2006 (#06000360)	Main, Lincoln, Preston, Walnut Sts., Chestnut Hill Rd., Burns Ave. 42°01′40″N 71°34′44″W	Millville	
92	Main Street Historic District	Main Street Historic District	April 6, 1982 (#82004484)	175-299 and 228-274 Main St. 42°02′57″N 71°52′56″W	Webster	
93	Manchaug Village Historic District	Manchaug Village Historic District	January 26, 2018 (#100002026)	Roughly bounded by Putnam Hill, Whitins, Morse, Mumford & Manchaug Rds. Ledge, Main, 3rd & Maple Sts., Stevens Pond; 42°05′39″N 71°44′50″W	Sutton	
94	Manning-Ball House	Manning-Ball House	December 13, 1995 (#95001442)	370 Manning St. 42°23′10″N 71°50′08″W	Jefferson	
95	Maples Cottage	Maples Cottage	March 25, 1980 (#80001681)	East of Shrewsbury on Oak St. 42°17′08″N 71°37′38″W	Westborough	
96	Marlborough Brook Filter Beds	Marlborough Brook Filter Beds	January 18, 1990 (#89002286)	Framingham Rd. 42°19′47″N 71°32′09″W	Southborough	Extends into Marlborough, Middlesex County
97	Matthews Fulling Mill Site	Matthews Fulling Mill Site	November 12, 1975 (#75000302)	Address restricted	North Brookfield	1749 mill site near New Braintree line
98	Memorial Hall	Memorial Hall	May 9, 1985 (#85000983)	30 School St. 42°08′32″N 71°31′10″W	Milford	
99	Mendon Center Historic District	Mendon Center Historic District	June 19, 2003 (#03000552)	Roughly bounded by Main, Hastings, Maple, North, Washington, and George Sts. 42°06′28″N 71°33′13″W	Mendon	
100	Milford Town Hall	Milford Town Hall	September 22, 1977 (#77000200)	52 Main St. 42°08′33″N 71°31′02″W	Milford	
101	Moore State Park Historic District	Moore State Park Historic District	May 21, 2004 (#04000535)	off Massachusetts Route 31; 42°19′06″N 71°57′26″W	Paxton	
102	Mount Vernon Cemetery	Mount Vernon Cemetery	May 29, 2008 (#08000465)	Church St. 42°21′52″N 71°46′52″W	West Boylston	
103	Azariah Newton House	Azariah Newton House	October 14, 1999 (#99001252)	44 Silver Hill Rd. 42°10′02″N 71°32′08″W	Milford	
104	No. 4 Schoolhouse	No. 4 Schoolhouse	June 22, 1988 (#88000711)	Farrington Rd. 42°26′43″N 72°05′05″W	Barre	
105	North Avenue Rural Historic District	North Avenue Rural Historic District	July 25, 2003 (#03000683)	85-147 North Ave., 6-8 Trask Rd., 4-16 Hopedale St. 42°07′34″N 71°34′01″W	Mendon	
106	North Brookfield Town House	North Brookfield Town House	October 28, 2001 (#01001185)	185 N. Main St. 42°16′07″N 72°05′06″W	North Brookfield	
107	Northside Village Historic District	Northside Village Historic District	October 5, 1977 (#77000195)	Stafford St., Northside and Cemetery Rds. 42°09′53″N 71°57′24″W	Charlton	
108	Oakdale Village Historic District	Oakdale Village Historic District	July 5, 1996 (#96000738)	11-68 N. Main, 8–24 May, 6-10 Green, 12-23 High, 4-68 Laurel, 14-34 Waushacum, and park at Thomas and N. Main; 42°23′20″N 71°47′48″W	West Boylston	
109	Oakham Center Historic District	Oakham Center Historic District	February 6, 2020 (#100004337)	Roughly bounded by Coldbrook Rd., Maple St., Barre Rd., & Deacon Allen Dr. 42°21′13″N 72°02′34″W	Oakham	
110	Old Douglas Center Historic District	Old Douglas Center Historic District	October 28, 2001 (#01001186)	Roughly bounded by Church, Common, Main, NW. Main, SW. Main, and Webster Sts. 42°03′14″N 71°44′23″W	Douglas	
111	Old Indian Cemetery	Old Indian Cemetery	May 17, 2006 (#06000400)	50 Cottage St. 42°14′12″N 72°08′47″W	West Brookfield	
112	Old Stone Church	Old Stone Church	April 13, 1973 (#73000329)	Off MA 140; 42°22′29″N 71°46′59″W	West Boylston	
113	Oxford Main Street Historic District	Oxford Main Street Historic District	August 24, 2011 (#11000586)	Barton, Charlton, Church, E. Main, Elm, Fremont, & Main Sts., Quobaug Ave., Sigourney St., Sutton Ave., West St. Jackson; 42°07′01″N 71°51′53″W	Oxford	
114	Paddock Farm	Paddock Farm	February 23, 1996 (#96000143)	259 Salisbury St. 42°20′02″N 71°50′57″W	Holden	
115	Pan Burying Ground	Pan Burying Ground	July 11, 2007 (#07000682)	477 Main St. 42°25′50″N 71°35′24″W	Bolton	
116	Pan Historic District	Pan Historic District	August 16, 2018 (#100002783)	Main St., Annie Moore, Burnham, Hudson & Long Hill Rds. 42°25′45″N 71°34′33″W	Bolton	
117	Petersham Common Historic District	Petersham Common Historic District	May 11, 1982 (#82004481)	MA 32/122; 42°29′25″N 72°11′08″W	Petersham	
118	Pleasant Street School	Pleasant Street School	July 5, 1996 (#96000736)	54 Pleasant St. 42°14′54″N 71°59′51″W	Spencer	
119	Prescott Town House	Prescott Town House	February 21, 1989 (#89000043)	MA 32; 42°29′56″N 72°11′01″W	Petersham	Former town hall of Prescott, Massachusetts.
120	Princeton Center Historic District	Princeton Center Historic District	February 26, 1999 (#99000259)	Junction of Hubbardston and Mountain Rds. 42°26′57″N 71°52′43″W	Princeton	Boundary increase (added 2006-03-10): Princeton, MA
121	Prospect Heights Historic District	Prospect Heights Historic District	September 5, 1990 (#90001344)	Roughly bounded by Prospect Heights, Prospect, and Water Sts. 42°08′10″N 71°31′55″W	Milford	
122	Gen. Rufus Putnam House	Gen. Rufus Putnam House	November 28, 1972 (#72001330)	344 Main St. 42°22′29″N 71°58′15″W	Rutland	National Historic Landmark
123	Quinapoxet River Bridge	Quinapoxet River Bridge	April 8, 1990 (#89002292)	Thomas St. over the Quinapoxet River at the Wachusett Reservoir; 42°23′06″N 71°47′52″W	West Boylston	
124	Rider Tavern	Rider Tavern	May 19, 1976 (#76000292)	Stafford St. at Northside Rd. 42°09′52″N 71°57′14″W	Charlton	
125	Rock Castle School	Rock Castle School	June 7, 1989 (#89000437)	Prospect St. 42°03′13″N 71°52′41″W	Webster	Converted to residential use.
126	Rockdale Common Housing District	Rockdale Common Housing District	March 31, 1983 (#83000611)	4-20 McBride, 46-58 Plantation, and 37-42 Taft Sts. 42°09′09″N 71°38′50″W	Northbridge	
127	Rogers House	Rogers House	June 1, 1982 (#82004471)	28 Boyden Rd. 42°20′59″N 71°51′29″W	Holden	
128	Rural Glen Cemetery	Rural Glen Cemetery	September 4, 2020 (#100005076)	Worcester Rd. 42°27′55″N 71°59′54″W	Hubbardston	
129	Russell Corner Historic District	Russell Corner Historic District	February 22, 2006 (#06000060)	Merriam, Gregory Hill, East Princeton and Sterling Rds. and Bullock Lane; 42°27′14″N 71°52′06″W	Princeton	
130	Sawyer Homestead	Sawyer Homestead	September 13, 2000 (#00001036)	108 Maple St. 42°25′59″N 71°43′49″W	Sterling	
131	Shrewsbury Historic District	Shrewsbury Historic District	October 8, 1976 (#76000309)	Church Rd., Main, Prospect, Boylston, and Grafton Sts. 42°17′53″N 71°42′50″W	Shrewsbury	
132	Shumway Block	Shumway Block	December 3, 1980 (#80000468)	112-116 Main St. 42°02′55″N 71°53′07″W	Webster	
133	South Union School	South Union School	February 18, 2011 (#11000021)	21 Highland St. 42°16′05″N 71°31′49″W	Southborough	
134	Southborough Center Historic District	Southborough Center Historic District	December 29, 2021 (#100007264)	Main and Common Sts., Middle, Cordaville, and Latisquama Rds. 42°18′22″N 71°31′43″W	Southborough	
135	Southwick-Daniels Farm	Southwick-Daniels Farm	August 22, 1995 (#95001030)	286 Mendon St. 42°03′26″N 71°32′54″W	Blackstone	
136	Spaulding Block	Spaulding Block	December 3, 1980 (#80000466)	141-143 Main St. 42°02′56″N 71°53′05″W	Webster	
137	Spencer Town Center Historic District	Spencer Town Center Historic District	June 26, 1986 (#86001399)	Main between High and North Sts.; also 215-270 and 35-73 Main, 2-16 Linden, 3-24 Ash, 26-73 Cherry, 6–19 May, and 8 Park Sts.; also 10-29 Grove, 1-51 High, 9-85 Mechanic, 13-72 Pleasant, 5-62 Wall Sts., and parts of Prouty, Lincoln, Cherry and Jones Sts.; also Luther Hill Park; 42°14′42″N 71°59′33″W	Spencer	District has been enlarged three times; each set of addresses represents an increase.
138	John Spurr House	John Spurr House	April 26, 1976 (#76000293)	Main St. 42°08′06″N 71°58′10″W	Charlton	
139	Sterling Center Historic District	Sterling Center Historic District	April 14, 1988 (#88000425)	Roughly bounded by Meetinghouse Hill and Main, Maple and Kendall Hill, Boulding, Worcester and Princeton; 42°26′10″N 71°45′41″W	Sterling	
140	Stevens Linen Works Historic District	Stevens Linen Works Historic District	September 17, 2010 (#10000751)	8–10 Mill St., 2 W. Main St., 2 Curfew Ln., Ardlock Pl. 42°03′01″N 71°53′24″W	Dudley	Includes the main factory, related industrial buildings, and worker housing.
141	Joseph Stone House	Joseph Stone House	January 9, 1986 (#86000028)	35 Stone St. 42°11′07″N 71°49′51″W	Auburn	
142	Lucy Stone Home Site	Lucy Stone Home Site	February 8, 2021 (#100006122)	69 Coy Hill Rd. 42°15′23″N 72°11′32″W	West Brookfield	
143	Stony Farm	Stony Farm	December 13, 1995 (#95001441)	428 Salisbury St. 42°19′37″N 71°51′04″W	Holden	
144	Sturbridge Common Historic District	Sturbridge Common Historic District	November 9, 1977 (#77000656)	Main St. between Hall Rd. and Interstate 84; 42°06′25″N 72°04′44″W	Sturbridge	
145	Sudbury Dam Historic District	Sudbury Dam Historic District	January 18, 1990 (#89002265)	Southeastern end of Sudbury Reservoir off MA 30; 42°18′21″N 71°29′30″W	Southborough	Extends into Framingham, Middlesex County
146	Sutton Center Historic District	Sutton Center Historic District	May 25, 2001 (#01000541)	Roughly Boston Rd., Singletary Ave., and Uxbridge Rd. 42°09′05″N 71°45′54″W	Sutton	
147	Tantiusques Reservation	Tantiusques Reservation	October 6, 1983 (#83004141)	Leadmine Rd. 42°03′26″N 72°07′52″W	Sturbridge	
148	Ted's Diner	Ted's Diner	November 29, 2000 (#00001395)	67 Main St. 42°08′34″N 71°31′05″W	Milford	Demolished in 2002.
149	Benjamin Thayer House	Benjamin Thayer House	December 30, 2009 (#09001174)	200 Farm St. 42°02′49″N 71°31′47″W	Blackstone	
150	Thom Block	Thom Block	June 23, 1983 (#83003435)	83-89 Main St. 42°08′32″N 71°31′07″W	Milford	
151	Thompson School	Thompson School	June 7, 1989 (#89000436)	Prospect St. 42°03′02″N 71°52′42″W	Webster	Converted to residential use.
152	Tobin's Beach Site	Tobin's Beach Site	July 22, 1986 (#86003808)	Address restricted	Brookfield	Boundary increase approved December 17, 2018
153	Tuttle Square School	Tuttle Square School	March 8, 2002 (#02000129)	41 South St. 42°11′29″N 71°50′06″W	Auburn	
154	Upton State Forest-Civilian Conservation Corps Resources Historic District	Upton State Forest-Civilian Conservation Corps Resources Historic District	October 8, 2014 (#14000841)	205 Westborough Rd. 42°12′33″N 71°36′29″W	Upton	
155	Upton Center Historic District	Upton Center Historic District	January 14, 2015 (#14001150)	Church, Main, Milford, Nelson, N. Main, Plain, Pleasant, School & Warren Sts. 42°10′26″N 71°36′11″W	Upton	
156	Upton Town Hall	Upton Town Hall	February 12, 1999 (#99000185)	1 Main St. 42°10′26″N 71°35′32″W	Upton	
157	US Post Office-Millbury Main	US Post Office-Millbury Main	October 15, 1987 (#87001764)	119 Elm St. 42°11′27″N 71°44′59″W	Millbury	
158	US Post Office-Whitinsville Main	US Post Office-Whitinsville Main	October 15, 1987 (#86003433)	58 Church St. 42°06′38″N 71°39′47″W	Northbridge	
159	Vintonville Historic District	Vintonville Historic District	August 23, 2006 (#06000717)	Roughly bounded by Cottage, Green, Pine, Brigham, Beach Sts., and rear of properties along the east side of South St. 42°15′59″N 71°36′33″W	Westborough	
160	Wachusett Aqueduct Linear District	Wachusett Aqueduct Linear District	January 18, 1990 (#89002276)	Along Wachusett Aqueduct from Wachusett Reservoir to Sudbury Reservoir; 42°20′01″N 71°35′27″W	Berlin, Clinton, and Northborough, Southborough	Extends into Marlborough, Middlesex County
161	Wachusett Dam Historic District	Wachusett Dam Historic District	January 18, 1990 (#89002269)	Northern end of Wachusett Reservoir at Lancaster Millpond; 42°24′17″N 71°41′17″W	Clinton	
162	Gen. Artemas Ward Homestead	Gen. Artemas Ward Homestead	May 4, 1976 (#76000308)	Main St., opposite Dean Park; 42°17′42″N 71°41′50″W	Shrewsbury	
163	Ware-Hardwick Covered Bridge	Ware-Hardwick Covered Bridge	May 8, 1986 (#86001006)	Old Gilbertville Rd. and Bridge St. 42°18′37″N 72°12′45″W	Hardwick	
164	Warren First Congregational Church-Federated Church	Warren First Congregational Church-Federated Church	November 27, 2004 (#04001258)	25 Winthrop Terrace; 42°12′49″N 72°11′31″W	Warren	
165	Warren Public Library	Warren Public Library	March 13, 2000 (#00000146)	Main St. at Bacon St. 42°12′48″N 72°11′35″W	Warren	
166	Warren Town Hall	Warren Town Hall	June 14, 2001 (#01000650)	1 Main St. 42°12′46″N 72°11′43″W	Warren	
167	Jonah Warren House	Jonah Warren House	November 5, 1998 (#98001331)	64 Warren St. 42°14′54″N 71°36′12″W	Westborough	
168	Washburn Square-Leicester Common Historic District	Washburn Square-Leicester Common Historic District	February 22, 2006 (#06000062)	Main St., Washburn Sq., 3 Paxton St. 42°14′46″N 71°54′13″W	Leicester	
169	Waters Farm	Waters Farm	April 4, 1985 (#85000695)	53 Waters Rd. 42°06′21″N 71°47′02″W	Sutton	
170	Asa Waters Mansion	Asa Waters Mansion	February 14, 1978 (#78000479)	123 Elm St. 42°11′24″N 71°45′46″W	Millbury	
171	Webster Municipal Buildings Historic District	Webster Municipal Buildings Historic District	March 27, 2012 (#12000152)	350 Main, 29 Negus, & 2 Lake Sts. 42°02′59″N 71°52′48″W	Webster	
172	West Brick School	West Brick School	March 1, 2011 (#11000070)	1592 Old Turnpike Rd. 42°21′44″N 72°04′54″W	Oakham	
173	West Brookfield Center Historic District	West Brookfield Center Historic District	June 28, 1990 (#90000885)	Roughly Central and Cottage Sts. from Sherman St. to Lake St. and west, N. and S. Main Sts. from Chapman Ave. to Maple St. 42°14′04″N 72°08′30″W	West Brookfield	
174	West Main Street Historic District	West Main Street Historic District	June 16, 1987 (#87000884)	Roughly bounded by Milk, Main, Blake, and Fay Sts.; also 83-118 W. Main St.; also roughly bounded by Charles, Forbes, South and Cross Sts.; also portions of E. Main St., High St., Lincoln St., Milk St., Prospect and Spring Sts. 42°16′07″N 71°37′04″W	Westborough	Second, third, and fourth sets of boundaries represent boundary increases of December 6, 1990, June 16, 1987, and May 29, 2009 respectively
175	West Sutton Historic District	West Sutton Historic District	August 8, 2001 (#01000871)	Central Turnpike and Douglas, Town Farm, and West Sutton Rds. 42°07′02″N 71°48′11″W	Sutton	
176	West Village Historic District	West Village Historic District	October 16, 2009 (#09000827)	Allen Hill, Goodnow, Hubbardston, and Radford Rds. 42°27′06″N 71°53′05″W	Princeton	
177	Westborough State Hospital	Westborough State Hospital	January 21, 1994 (#93001488)	Along Lyman St. north of Chauncy Lake, and the junction of South St. and MA 9; 42°18′04″N 71°36′37″W	Westborough	
178	Weston Aqueduct Linear District	Weston Aqueduct Linear District	January 18, 1990 (#89002274)	Along Weston Aqueduct from Sudbury Reservoir to Weston Reservoir; 42°20′00″N 71°22′32″W	Southborough	Extends into Middlesex County
179	White Homestead-Salem Cross Inn	White Homestead-Salem Cross Inn	April 14, 1975 (#09000619)	260 West Main Street; 42°14′41″N 72°10′25″W	West Brookfield	
180	Whitcomb Inn and Farm	Whitcomb Inn and Farm	May 2, 2002 (#02000431)	43 Old Sugar Rd. 42°26′44″N 71°34′54″W	Bolton	
181	Whitinsville Historic District	Whitinsville Historic District	April 7, 1983 (#83000613)	Church, East, Fletcher, Hill, Woodland, Lake, and Water Sts., Castle Hill Rd., and Linwood Ave. 42°06′28″N 71°40′00″W	Northbridge	
182	Wickaboag Valley Historic District	Wickaboag Valley Historic District	October 27, 2000 (#00001201)	Roughly bounded by the Wickaboag Pond, Mill Stone Rd., Madden Rd., and the New Braintree border 42°15′11″N 72°09′14″W	West Brookfield	
183	Oliver Wight House	Oliver Wight House	June 1, 1982 (#82004483)	Main St. 42°06′41″N 72°05′22″W	Sturbridge	
184	Willard House and Clock Museum	Willard House and Clock Museum	June 1, 1982 (#82004470)	11 Willard St. 42°14′20″N 71°40′25″W	Grafton	
185	Willard-Fisk House	Willard-Fisk House	February 23, 1996 (#96000163)	121 Whitney St. 42°22′44″N 71°53′11″W	Holden	
186	Woodlawn Cemetery	Woodlawn Cemetery	July 23, 2013 (#13000535)	2 Woodlawn St. 42°25′09″N 71°41′29″W	Clinton	

== Former listing ==
	Name on the Register	Image	Date listed	Date removed	Location	City or town	Description
1	Northborough Town Hall		February 23, 1972 (#72000151)	May 5, 2000	NE corner of W. Main and Blake St.	Northborough	Destroyed by fire September 18, 1985.
