= West Brick School =

- U.S. National Register of Historic Places
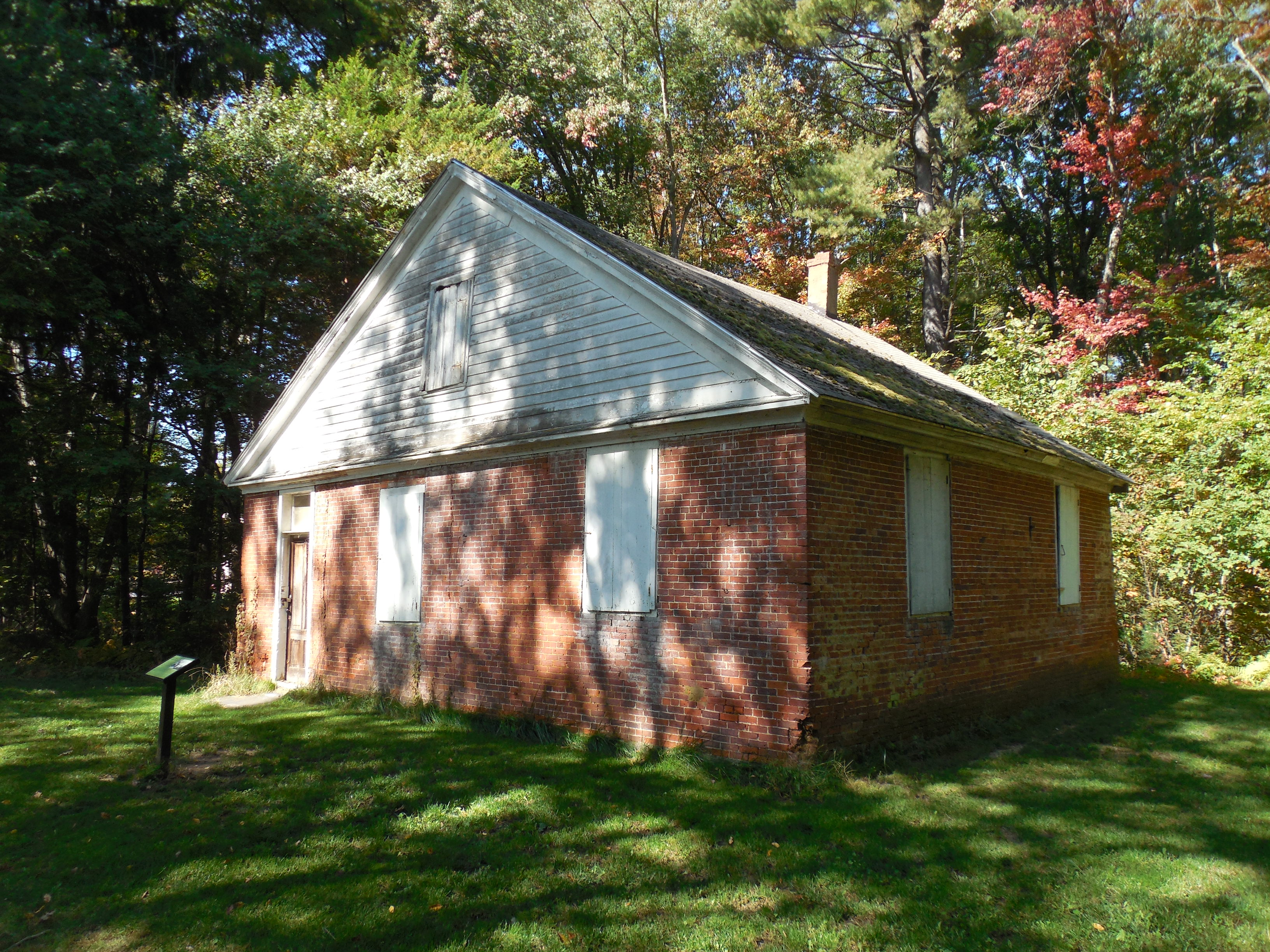
- West Brick School

- Location within Massachusetts Location within the United States
- Location: 1492 Old Turnpike Road, Oakham, Massachusetts
- Coordinates: 42°21′44″N 72°04′54″W
- Built: c. 1827
- Architectural style: Federal
- NRHP reference No.: 11000070
- Added to NRHP: March 1, 2011

The West Brick School is an historic school building at 1492 Old Turnpike Road in Oakham, Massachusetts. Built about 1827, it is one of the rural community's few surviving 19th-century brick buildings. It served as a school until 1920, and was thereafter converted to a summer residence. It was listed on the National Register of Historic Places in 2011.

== Description and history ==
The West Brick School is located in northwestern Oakham, on the north side of Old Turnpike Road, between Scott Road and the Old West Cemetery. The school is a small 1-1/2 story brick structure, with a front-facing gable roof and a stone foundation. The gable ends are finished in wooden clapboards, with a window opening (typically covered by batten shutters) at the center of the south one. The front (south-facing) facade is three bays wide, with the entrance in the left bay, topped by a transom window. Windows are set in all sides except the west side, which has no openings. The interior has a small entry hall, which opens into a single room occupying most of the interior. A storage space along the west wall was probably intended for storage of firewood. The interior has original flooring and walls, including vertical wainscoting and plaster. Interior doors retain original hardward and fastenings. The property includes the remnants of an old outhouse, and an organized roughly dome-shape pile of dressed stone that may have served as a base for a flagpole.

The building was built c. 1827 on the site of an 18th-century schoolhouse, with brick that was probably sourced from a brickyard on New Braintree Road. It served as a school until 1920, when it was closed due to declining enrollment. The school underwent a number of alterations during this time, mainly due to state requirements governing school facilities. These were largely limited to improving ventilation during the heating season, and occasionally using shutters to manage light levels in the building. After the school was closed, ownership apparently reverted to the adjacent land owner. In 1936 it was converted into a summer retreat by a Worcester couple, with sensitive attention to its historic character. In 2002 it was purchased by the town.

== See also ==
- National Register of Historic Places listings in Worcester County, Massachusetts
