= Thom Block =

- U.S. National Register of Historic Places
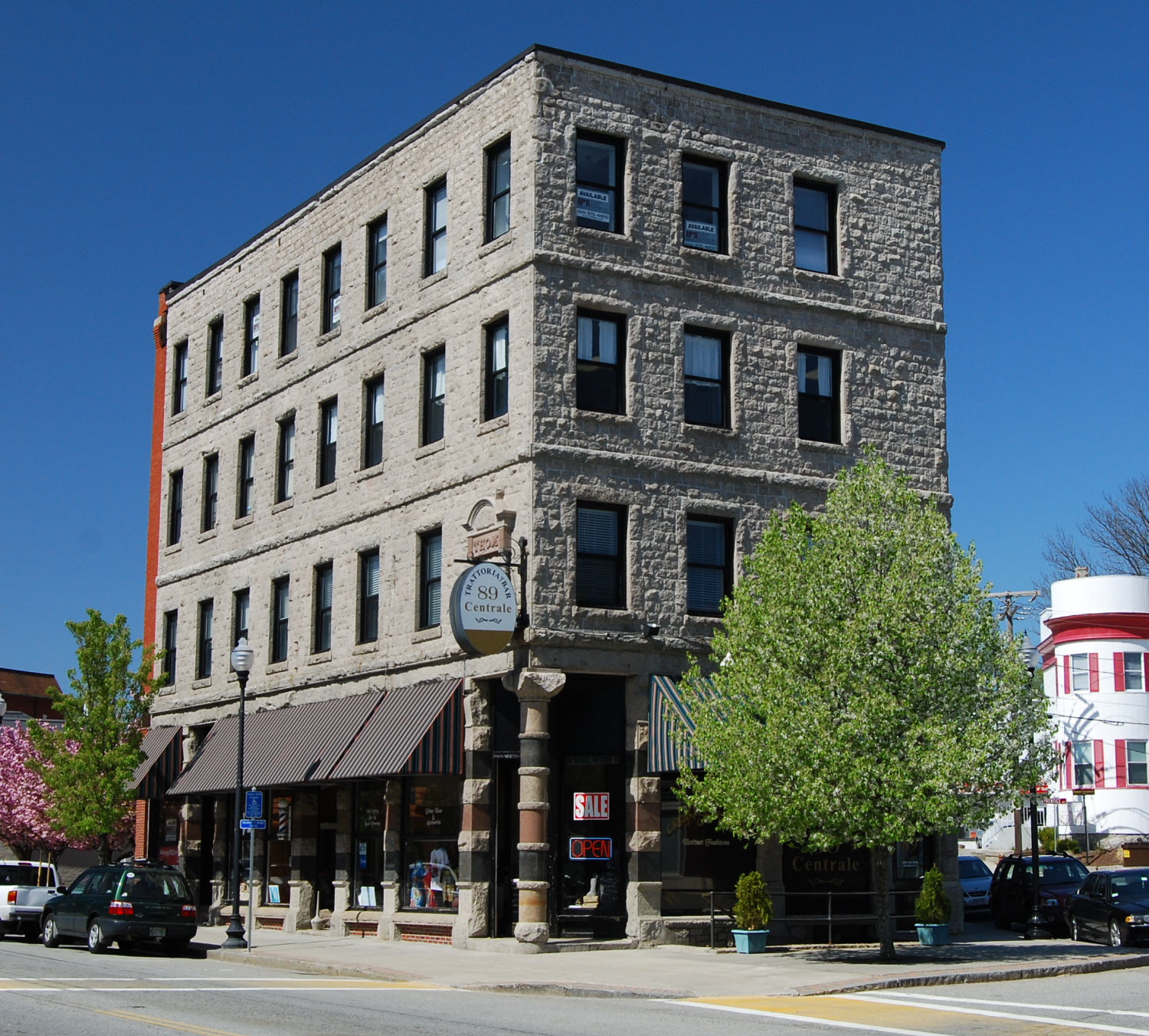

- Location within Massachusetts Location within the United States
- Location: Milford, Massachusetts
- Coordinates: 42°8′32″N 71°31′7″W
- Built: 1891
- Architect: James Thom
- NRHP reference No.: 83003435
- Added to NRHP: June 23, 1983

The Thom Block is an historic mixed-used commercial and residential building at 83-89 Main Street in Milford, Massachusetts. It is distinctive as being Milford's only building to be built out of locally quarried granite. The four-story building was built in 1891; its interior was gutted by fire shortly before its construction was completed. It originally housed three retail spaces on the ground floors, and two residential units on each of the upper floors.

The building was listed on the National Register of Historic Places in 1983.

== See also ==
- National Register of Historic Places listings in Worcester County, Massachusetts
