= Stony Farm =

- U.S. National Register of Historic Places
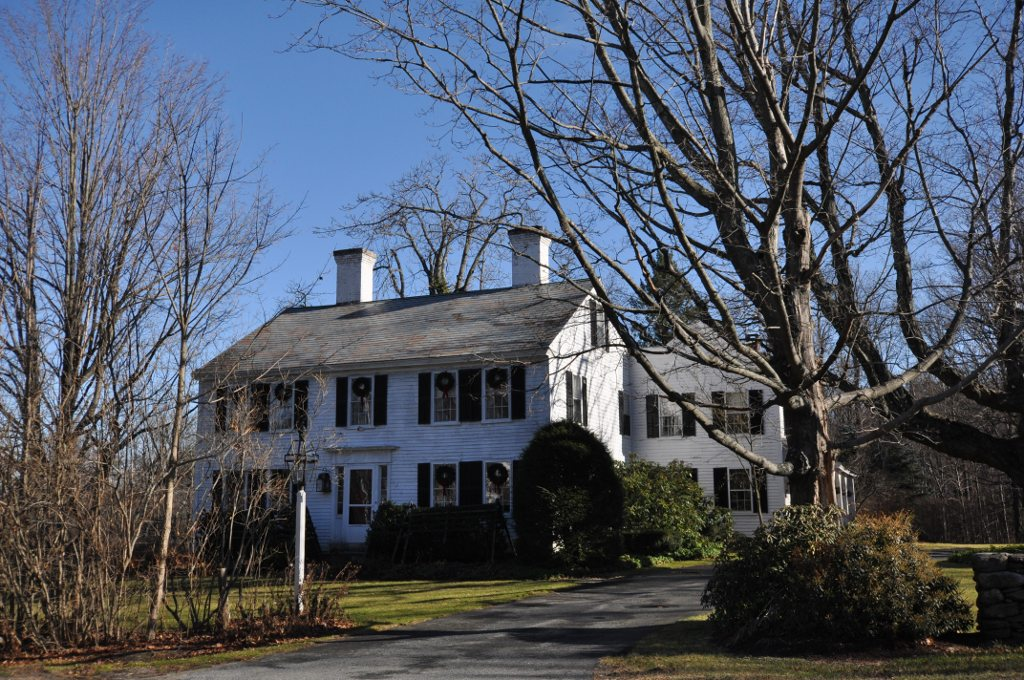

- Location within Massachusetts Location within the United States
- Location: 428 Salisbury Street, Holden, Massachusetts
- Coordinates: 42°19′37″N 71°51′4″W
- Area: 7.9 acres (3.2 ha)
- Built: 1790
- Architectural style: Federal
- NRHP reference No.: 95001441
- Added to NRHP: December 13, 1995

Stony Farm is a historic farmstead in Holden, Massachusetts. Built about 1790, the main house is a well-preserved local example of Federal architecture, and the surviving elements of the one-extensive farm property are a reminder of Holden's predominantly agrarian past. The house was listed on the National Register of Historic Places in 1995.

== Description and history ==
Stony Farm is in southern Holden, set on the east side of Salisbury Street, a historic roadway connecting Holden center and Worcester to the south. The property associated with the farm, now just under 8 acres (3.2 ha), once extended to more than 100 acres (40 ha), includes stone walls and other typical New England farmland features, as well as a barn, garage, and several sheds. The main house is 2-1/2 stories in height, oriented facing west, with a side gable roof, two interior chimneys, clapboard siding, and a stone foundation. Its five-bay front is symmetrical, with flanking sidelight windows and an entablature above. A two-story ell extends to the rear from the southeast corner. The interior follows a center-hall plan, with a modest staircase in the center hall, and the main parlor to its left, with a carved Federal style fireplace mantel.

The house was traditionally ascribed a construction date of about 1779, but deed research has determined that it was more likely built in the early 1790s by Tilla Chafin, who assembled a farm property of more than 50 acres (20 ha), sold in 1828 to his son "with buildings thereon". Later owners enlarged the farm holdings, much of which were sold off for residential development in 1974. The complex, its outbuildings dating from the 19th century to 1936 (when the garage was built), is a well-kept reminder of the town's agrarian past.

== See also ==
- National Register of Historic Places listings in Worcester County, Massachusetts
