= Elm Hill Farm Historic District =

Historic district in Massachusetts, United States

- U.S. National Register of Historic Places
- U.S. Historic district
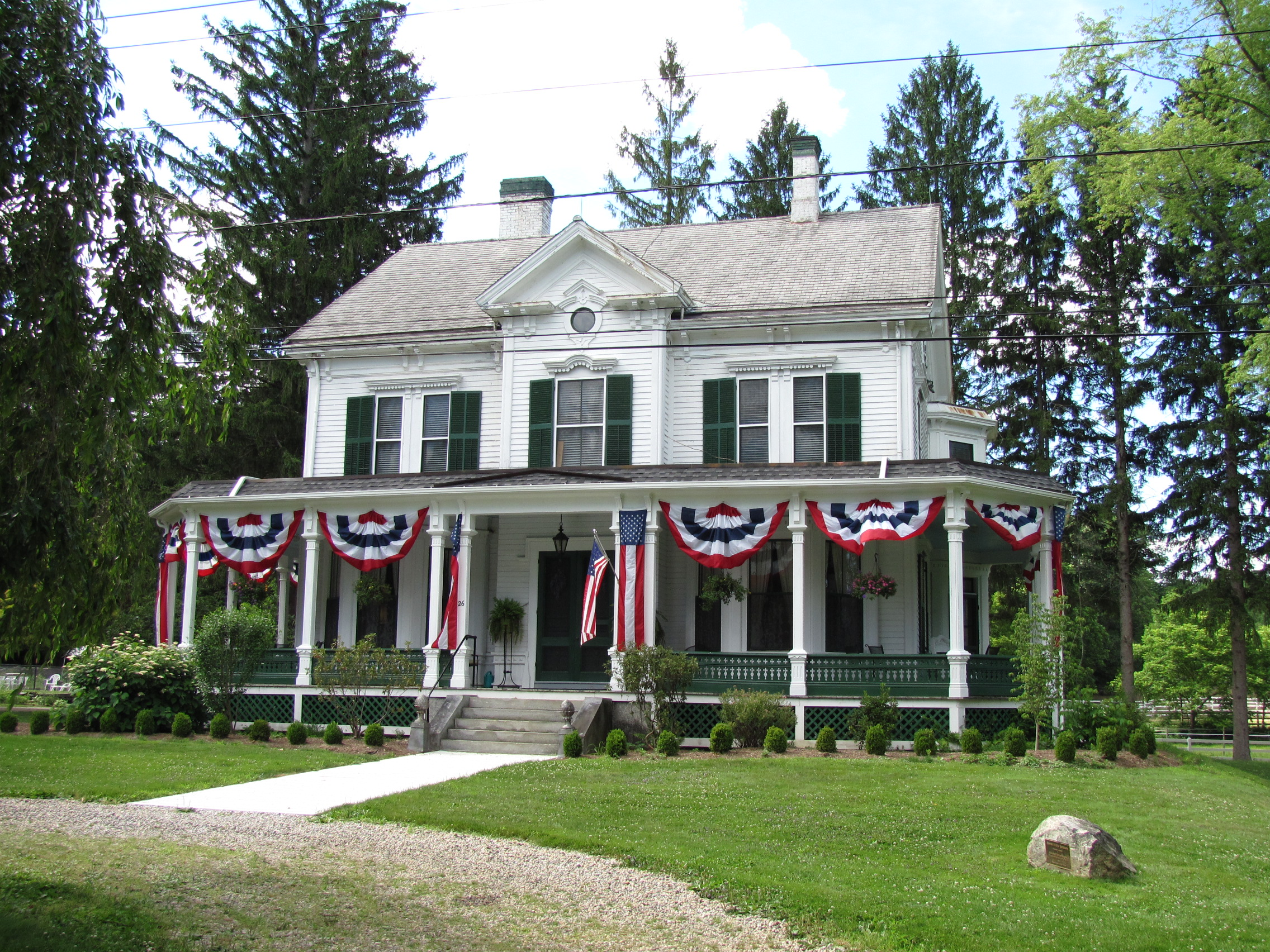
- Elm Hill Farm

- Location within Massachusetts Location within the United States
- Location: Brookfield, Massachusetts
- Coordinates: 42°13′16″N 72°5′10″W
- Built: 1770
- Architectural style: Federal, Late Victorian
- NRHP reference No.: 91000600
- Added to NRHP: May 16, 1991

Elm Hill Farm Historic District is a historic district on East Main Street east of the junction with Brookfield Road in Brookfield, Massachusetts. The major contributing element to the district is the Elm Hill Farm complex, one of the largest and most significant farms in the town for more than 100 years. The complex includes two Federal period residences, two with Queen Anne styling, and four Italianate styled outbuildings.

Elsie the Cow was originally housed on Elm Hill Farm. The district was listed on the National Register of Historic Places in 1991.

== See also ==
- National Register of Historic Places listings in Worcester County, Massachusetts
