= Gilbertville Historic District =

Historic district in Massachusetts, United States

- U.S. National Register of Historic Places
- U.S. Historic district
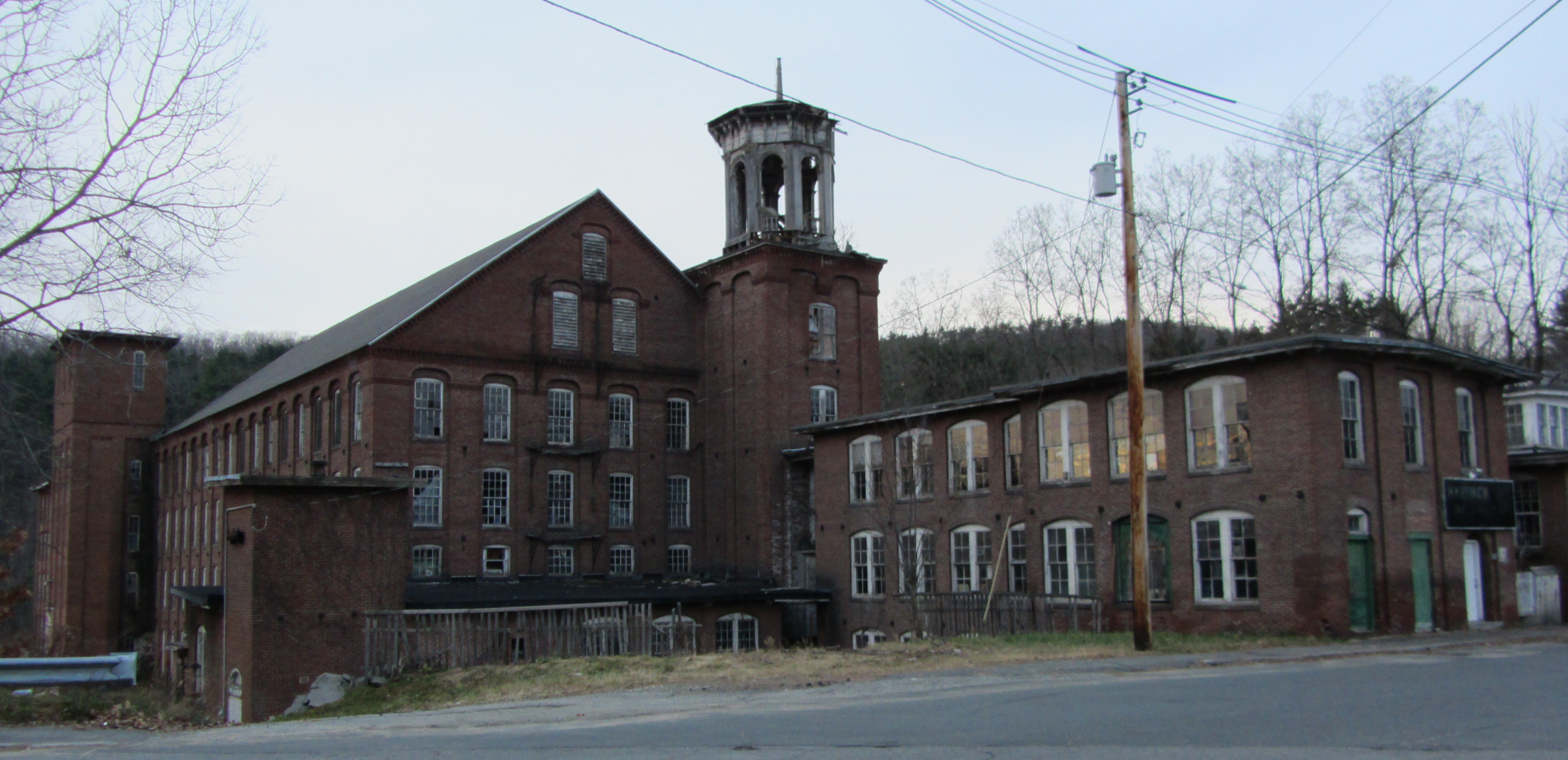
- Gilbertville mill in 2011

- Location within Massachusetts Location within the United States
- Location: Hardwick, Massachusetts
- Coordinates: 42°18′24″N 72°12′32″W
- Architect: Gilbert Manufacturing Co.
- Architectural style: Late 19th And 20th Century Revivals, Late Victorian, Gothic Revival
- NRHP reference No.: 91001848
- Added to NRHP: December 26, 1991

Gilbertville Historic District is a historic district roughly on Main, Church, High, North, Broad and Bridge Streets Gilbertville, Massachusetts within Hardwick, Massachusetts. The district was added to the National Register of Historic Places in 1991. The nearby Ware-Hardwick Covered Bridge is also on the National Register of Historic Places.

The village of Gilbertville grew up around a wool textile mill on the Ware River founded in the 1860s by George H. Gilbert, who already had wool factories in nearby Ware. His Gilbert Manufacturing Company built a Congregational church and a library for his workers, and also helped build the local high school. As many Catholic immigrants came to work in the mills, St. Aloysius Church was established to serve them. The wool industry had already begun to decline by 1938, when a flood destroyed much of the village.

== See also ==
- National Register of Historic Places listings in Worcester County, Massachusetts
