= Hubbardston Public Library =

- U.S. National Register of Historic Places
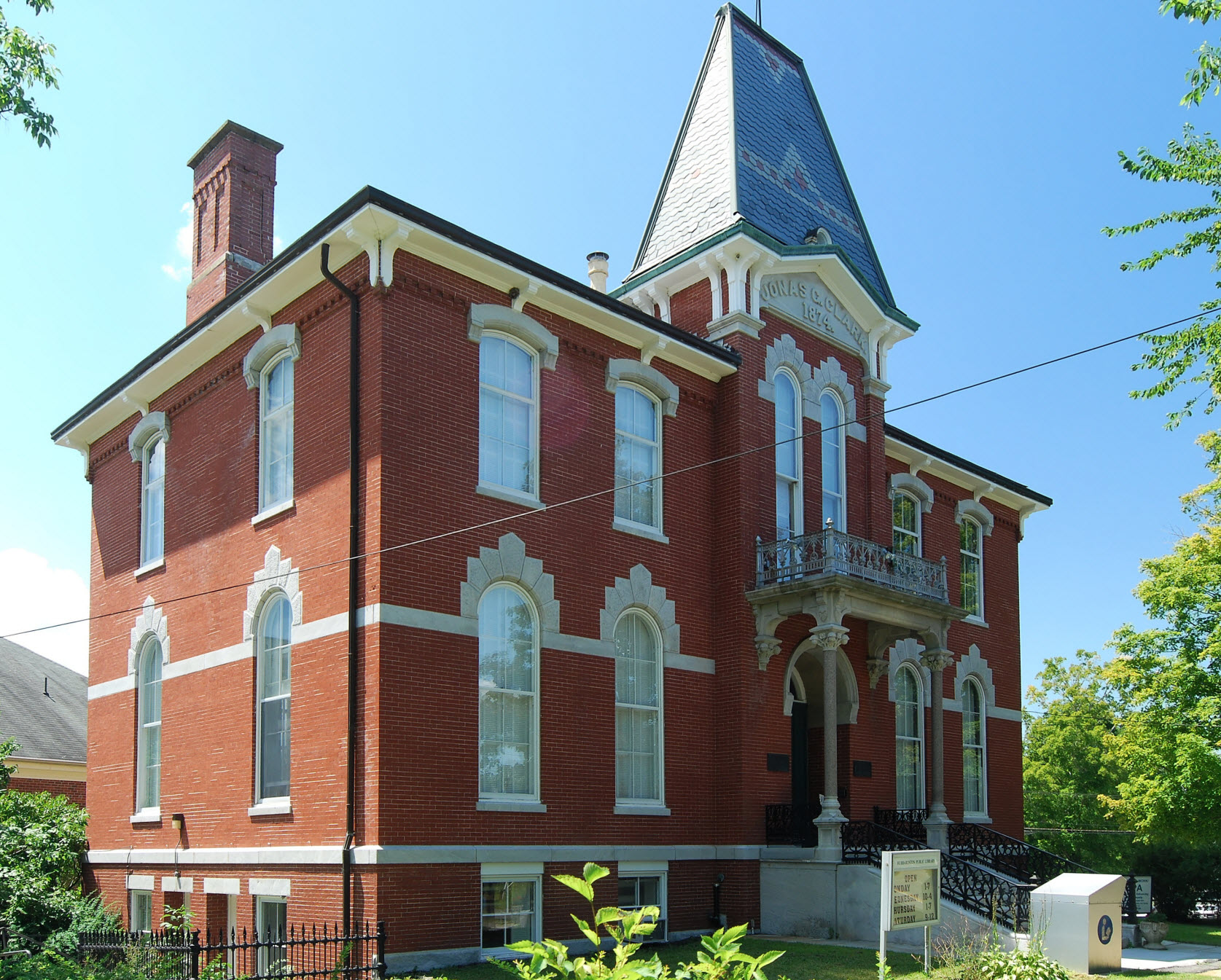

- Location within Massachusetts Location within the United States
- Location: Hubbardston, Massachusetts
- Coordinates: 42°28′30″N 72°0′28″W
- Area: less than one acre
- Built: 1874
- Architect: E. Boyden & Son
- Architectural style: Italianate
- NRHP reference No.: 98000989
- Added to NRHP: August 19, 1998

The Hubbardston Public Library is the public library of Hubbardston, Massachusetts. The library, located at 7 Main Street, serves the town by providing a wide variety of materials, services, and events. It offers Internet access and access to the CWMARS resource-sharing catalog.

The library is housed in one of Hubbardston's most architecturally significant buildings, an 1874 Second Empire/Italianate brick building that also houses the town offices. Construction of the building, and a significant portion of the library's early collection were made possible through grants and gifts from Hubbardston native Jonas G. Clark, founder of Worcester's Clark University. The building was listed on the National Register of Historic Places in 1998.

== Architecture and building history ==
The library is located in the village center of Hubbardston, on the west side of Main Street (Massachusetts Route 68), north of its junction with Brigham and Elm Streets. It is the most distinctive and architecturally elaborate building in the village, two stories in height, built out of red brick, with granite and white wooden trim, and a slate roof. The center bay of the front facade projects, and is capped by a steeply pitched multicolor slate roof; this was originally crowned with iron cresting, which has been removed. Ground-floor windows are set in rounded openings with stepped granite headers, while second-floor windows are set in segmented-arch openings with bracketed lintels. The central bay has the main entrance recessed in a round-arch opening, with paired round-arch openings on the second level. A gable projects below the main tower roof, above a stone panel in which the name of the building's donor and year of construction are carved.

Prior to the construction of this building, the town of Hubbardston had no buildings in public ownership; its town meetings were held in the local church. It was the town's only public building until the 1980s, when the police station was built. It was designed by Worcester architect Elbridge Boyden for the donor, Jonas G. Clark, and was built on what had been three house lots, acquired by Clark for the purpose. Clark was probably responsible for bringing in the materials, and the craftsmen that constructed the building, from outside the community, whose other masonry buildings of the period were much simpler.

Since its construction, the building has housed the town's library, town offices, and a community meeting space.

== See also ==
- National Register of Historic Places listings in Worcester County, Massachusetts
