= Hardwick Village Historic District =

Historic district in Massachusetts, United States

- U.S. National Register of Historic Places
- U.S. Historic district
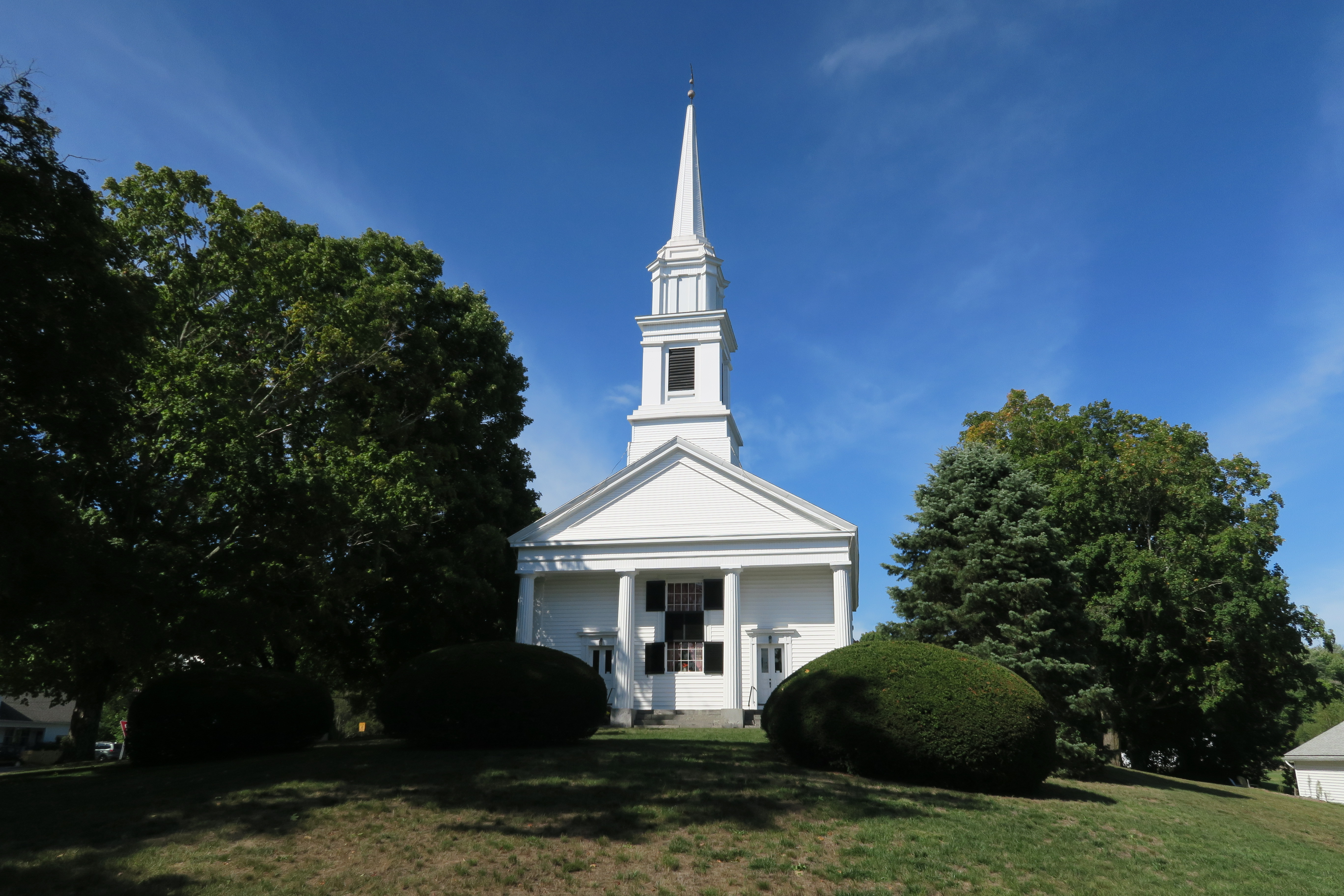
- Congregational Church

- Location within Massachusetts Location within the United States
- Location: Hardwick, Massachusetts
- Coordinates: 42°20′54″N 72°11′49″W
- Architect: Multiple
- Architectural style: Mid 19th Century Revival, Late Victorian, Federal
- NRHP reference No.: 91001849
- Added to NRHP: December 19, 1991

Hardwick Village Historic District is a historic district on Petersham, Barre, Greenwich, Ruggles Hill and Gilbertville Roads in Hardwick, Massachusetts. It was added to the National Register of Historic Places in 1991.

The town of Hardwick was incorporated in January 1739 after a group of settlers from Roxbury purchased land from the local Nipmuc Indians. The town was named in honor of Lord Hardwicke, an English nobleman, and became very prosperous before the American Revolutionary War. In 1762, one of its most prominent citizens, General Timothy Ruggles, established an annual market fair, a tradition that continues in the Hardwick Community Fair.

Water from its many nearby streams powered saw and grist mills, making the area an early source of manufactured goods as well as agricultural products. The growth of railroads during the 1800s also boosted the local economy by permitting those goods to be transported to larger markets.

== See also ==
- National Register of Historic Places listings in Worcester County, Massachusetts
