= Ware River Diversion =

Dam in Worcester County, Massachusetts, US

Coordinates: 42.3904°N 72.0602°W

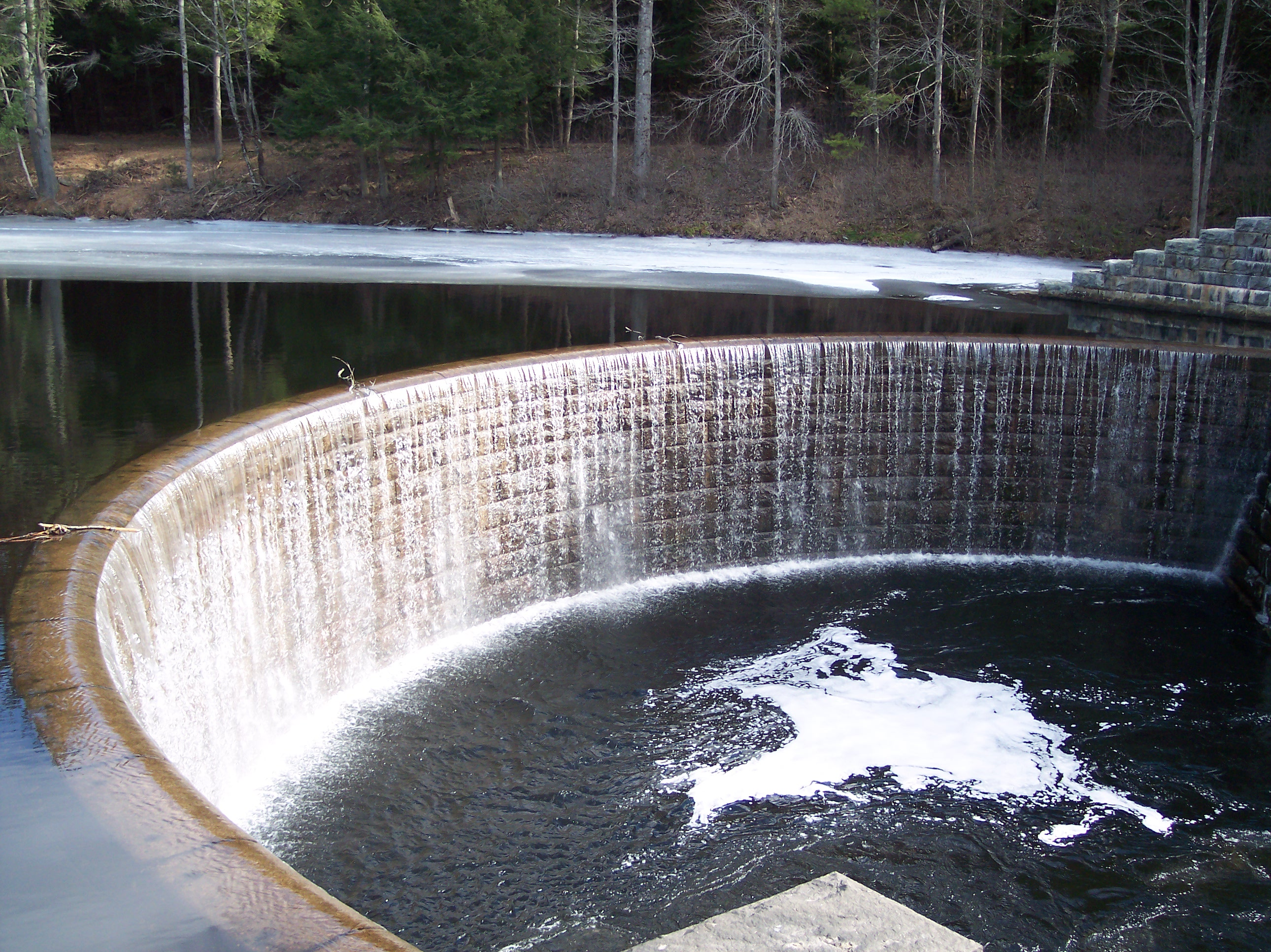
Dam at the Ware River Diversion

The Ware River Diversion is a dam on the Ware River. It is part of the Boston, Massachusetts public water supply system, maintained by the Massachusetts Water Resources Authority (MWRA). It is located in Worcester County in the town of Barre, close to its border with Oakham.

== Structures and purpose ==
Water flows from the Quabbin Reservoir to the Wachusett Reservoir using natural siphon action, through a tunnel called the Quabbin Aqueduct. This aqueduct is one of the longest in the world. The high point for the tunnel route is at the Ware River in South Barre, Massachusetts, near State Route 122 and Coldbrook Road.

At this point, a facility called the Ware River Diversion exists to control the Quabbin Aqueduct. This facility, consisting of a dam and hydraulic control systems, diverts the water from the Ware River into the aqueduct to either start a natural siphon or to store excess Ware River water in the Quabbin Reservoir. The Ware River Diversion is part of the Chicopee River Watershed.

On June 15, 1987, the Ware River Intake, which is where the water goes into the diversion, was re-dedicated and named the Roger H. Lonergan Intake.

== How it works ==
If the aqueduct route from the Ware River Diversion to the Wachusett Reservoir is closed (the Wachusett-Coldbrook branch) and water diversion occurs, water flows from the Ware River, back down grade to the Quabbin Reservoir for storage. This is typically done when the Wachusett Reservoir water level is increasing due to run-off from its own watershed.

If the aqueduct route from the Ware River Diversion to the Wachusett Reservoir is open, diversion of water from the Ware River water into both the Wachusett and the Quabbin Reservoir routes will start the siphon. Once the siphon starts, water from the Ware River Diversion stops and the water flows from the Quabbin to the Wachusett Reservoirs continue naturally.
