= Ware–Hardwick Covered Bridge =

- U.S. National Register of Historic Places
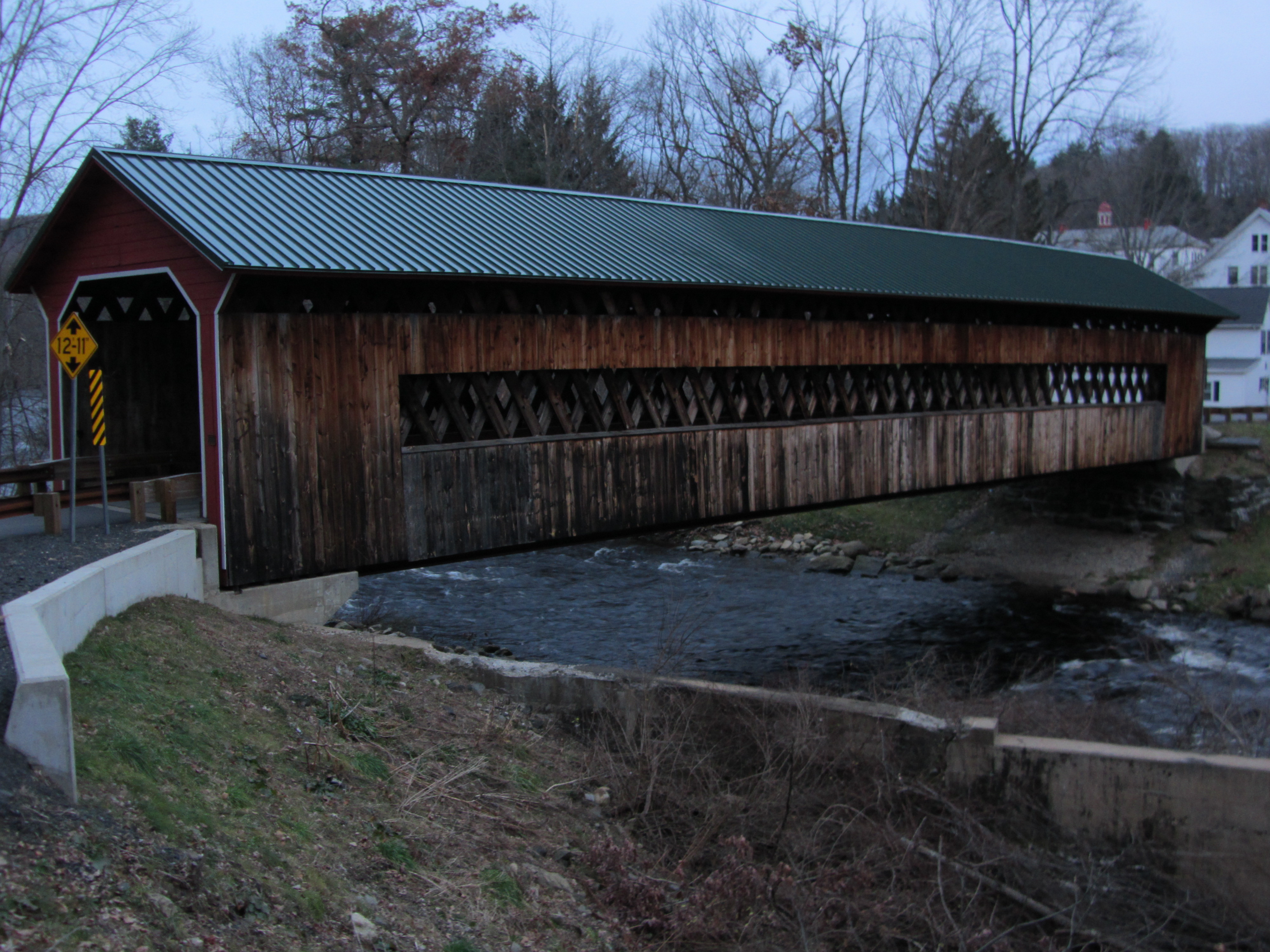
- Ware-Hardwick Covered Bridge in 2011

- Location within Massachusetts Location within the United States
- Location: Ware River, Ware and Hardwick, Massachusetts
- Coordinates: 42°18′37″N 72°12′45″W
- Area: less than one acre
- Built: 1886
- NRHP reference No.: 86001006
- Added to NRHP: May 8, 1986

Ware–Hardwick Covered Bridge is a historic covered bridge spanning the Ware River on Old Gilbertville Road and Bridge Street in Ware and the village of Gilbertville within Hardwick, Massachusetts. It is one of a small number of surviving 19th-century covered bridges in the state. The bridge was built in 1886, extensively rebuilt in 1986–1987, and was closed in 2002 due to structural issues and a limited carrying capacity. The bridge reopened in October 2010 and no longer has a weight limit according to MassDOT. It was listed on the National Register of Historic Places in 1986.

== Description and history ==
The Ware-Hardwick Bridge is located in the village of Gilbertville, a 19th-century industrial village on the Ware River in southern Hardwick and northern Ware. It is a single-span lattice truss in a style patented by architect Ithiel Town, with its exterior clad in vertical board siding and topped by a gabled metal roof. The siding does not fully cover the sides, leaving a strip exposed for light, and extends partway inside each portal. The bridge is about 137 feet (42 m) long and 25 feet (7.6 m) wide, carrying a single lane of traffic.

The bridge was built in 1886, and is managed by a joint committee of the two towns. It is one of a small number of 19th-century covered bridges that remain in the state. The bridge notably survived a major flooding event in the 1930s, when the textile mills in Gilbertville were destroyed.

The state ordered the structure closed in August 2002 after an inspection concluded the bridge could not bear any more weight, due in part to insect infestation. The limit at the time was 6 short tons (5.4 t). In October 2010 the bridge reopened upon the completion of a $1.9 million reconstruction and restoration, and no longer has a weight limit. Wood taken from the bridge was divided between the towns; the Ware Historical Commission planned to use Ware's share of the wood to recreate other historic buildings.

== See also ==
- National Register of Historic Places listings in Hampshire County, Massachusetts
- National Register of Historic Places listings in Worcester County, Massachusetts
- List of bridges on the National Register of Historic Places in Massachusetts
