= Oakham Center Historic District =

Historic district in Massachusetts, United States

- U.S. National Register of Historic Places
- U.S. Historic district
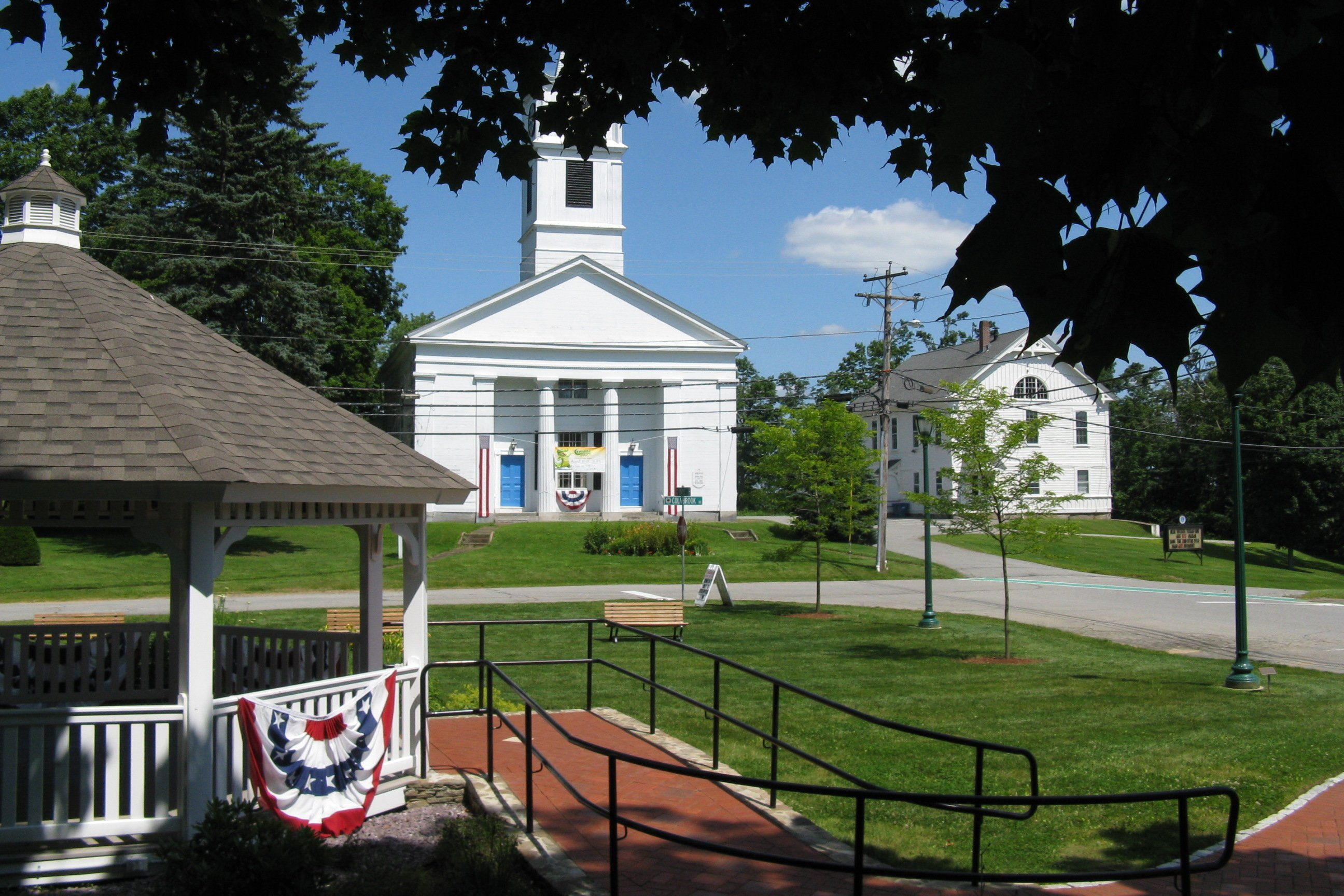

- Location within Massachusetts Location within the United States
- Location: Roughly bounded by Coldbrook Rd., Maple St., Barre Rd., & Deacon Allen Dr., Oakham, Massachusetts
- Coordinates: 42°21′13″N 72°02′34″W
- Built: 1770
- Architectural style: Colonial; Federal; Greek Revival
- NRHP reference No.: 100004337
- Added to NRHP: February 6, 2020

The Oakham Center Historic District encompasses a portion of the historic town center of Oakham, Massachusetts. Roughly bounded by Coldbrook Rd., Maple St., Barre Rd., and Deacon Allen Drive, the area was formed as a civic center about 1770, with town incorporation following in 1775. It includes a well-preserved variety of early 19th-century residential architecture, as well as the town's Greek Revival Congregational church, and its 1908 library. The district was listed on the National Register of Historic Places in 2020.

== Description and history ==
The town of Oakham, located in western Worcester County, was first settled by colonists in the 1740s as a district of Rutland, and was incorporated in 1775. Early settlement was dispersed and agricultural, and the town center did not begin to take shape until 1770, when William Hunter gave the town land near a crossroads for a church, school, animal pound, and burying ground. This junction, now where Maple Street, Coldbrook Road, and Ware Corner Road meet, became the core of the town center. Residential growth in the village was most significant during the first half of the 19th century, extending mainly to the west along Maple Street, with many of the houses also including small industrial or commercial workshops. An inn stood facing the common until it burned in 1908.

The Congregational church is the most prominent focal point of the village. Originally built in 1814 to replace a much cruder older structure, it was moved, enlarged, and restyled in the 1840s to give it its present Greek Revival character. Its steeple was damaged in the Great New England Hurricane of 1938. Nearby stands the 1908 library, a stone structure built using fieldstones donated by the townspeople from their properties. Houses of architectural interest on Maple Street include two which have Greek Revival temple fronts with two-story columns, and a 1912 Craftsman house which is one of the newest in the district. The oldest house in the village is a c. 1790 Georgian Cape on Coldbrook Road.

== See also ==
- National Register of Historic Places listings in Worcester County, Massachusetts
