= Quabbin Regional Middle High School =

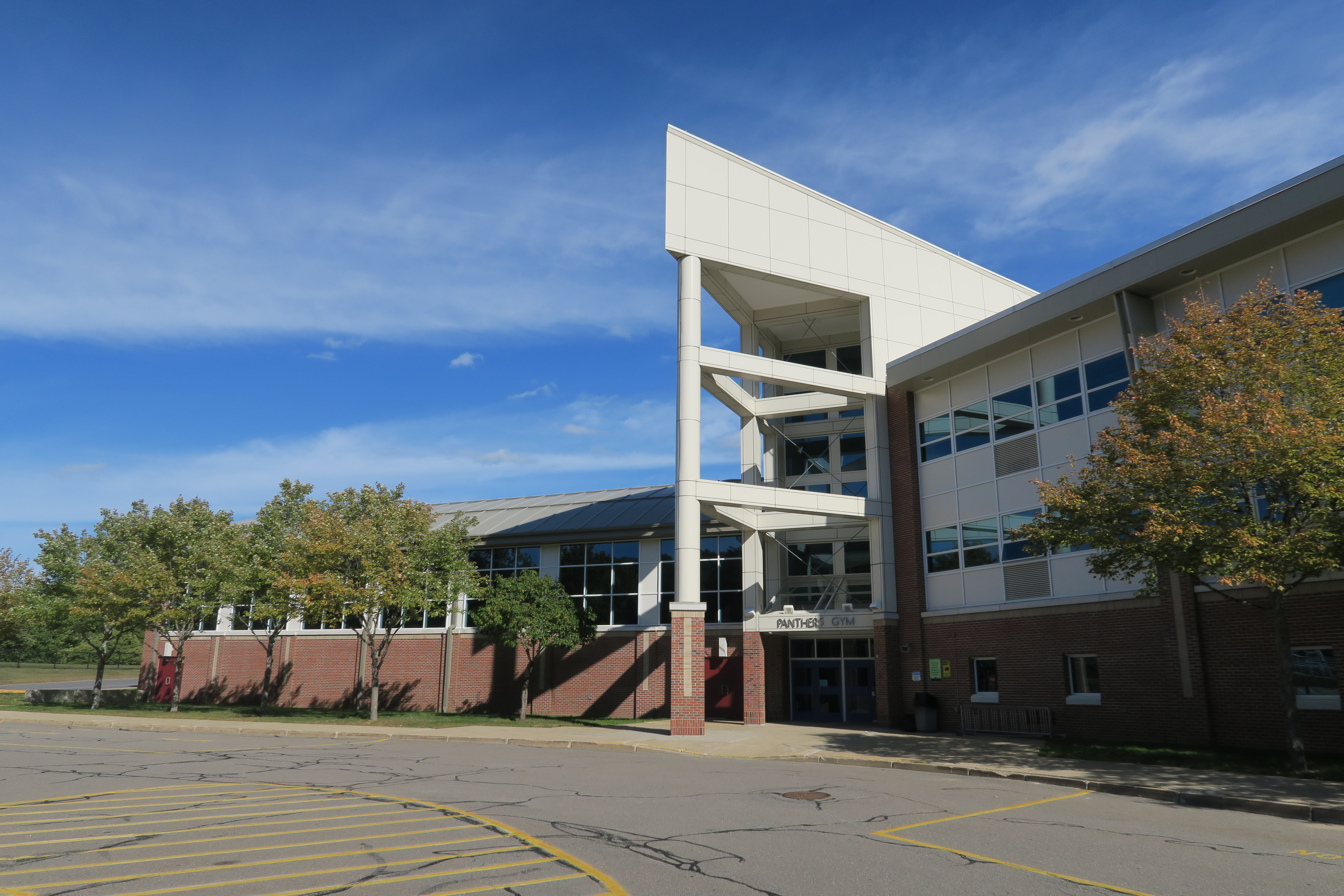

Location
- 872 South Street; Barre, Massachusetts 01005; United States; 42°24′00″N 72°06′53″W

Information
- Type: Public, open-enrollment middle-high school
- Superintendent: Shelia Muir
- Principal: Abigail Rigney
- Staff: 44.93 (FTE)
- Grades: 6–12
- Enrollment: 566 (2022–23)
- Student to teacher ratio: 12.60
- Area: Quabbin Regional School District (western-central Worcester County)
- Colors: Blue and gold
- Athletics conference: Midland Wachusett League
- Mascot: Panther
- Newspaper: The Mezzanine
- Yearbook: Exodus
- Communities served: Barre, Hardwick, Hubbardston, New Braintree, Oakham
- Website: www.qrsd.org

Quabbin Regional Middle High School (QRMHS) is a secondary school in Barre, Massachusetts, United States, for students in grades 6-12; it serves as the middle school and high school for the Quabbin Regional School District. The school operates under a single principal, with assistant principals managing grades 6-7, 8-9, and 10-12. It serves the towns of Barre, Hardwick, Hubbardston, New Braintree, and Oakham. QRMHS also maintains a Naval Junior Reserve Officers' Training Corps (NJROTC) program for grades 9-12.

== Quabbin Regional School District ==
The Quabbin Regional School District (QRSD) covers western-central Worcester County, Massachusetts, primarily serving the towns of Barre, Hardwick, Hubbardston, New Braintree, and Oakham; however, QRSD participates in the Massachusetts Department of Education's Inter-District School Choice, which "allows families to enroll their children in schools in communities other than the city or town in which they reside." The district consists of five elementary schools; the Ruggles Lane School (Barre), Hardwick Elementary School, Hubbardston Center School, New Braintree School, and Oakham Center School, and one combined middle and high school, the Quabbin Regional Middle High School (QRMHS).

The elementary schools formerly served kindergarten through 6th grade; In 2017 all QRSD elementary schools transferred their 6th grade programs to QRMHS.
