= Adeliza Perry =

Teacher, writer, and nurse

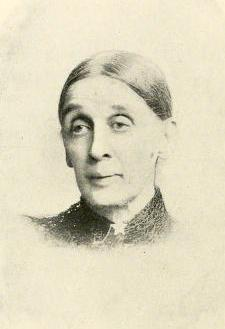
- Adeliza Perry, from an 1895 publication.
- Born: January 27, 1822; Hardwick, Massachusetts
- Died: March 13, 1901 (aged 79); Worcester, Massachusetts
- Occupations: Teacher, writer
- Known for: Nurse during American Civil War

Adeliza Perry (January 27, 1822 – March 13, 1901) was a teacher and writer from Massachusetts, who served as a nurse in the American Civil War.

== Early life ==
Adeliza T. Perry was from Hardwick, Massachusetts, the daughter of Ebenezer Perry and Mercy Atwood Perry. Her father was a carpenter and a schoolteacher, who also served in town government. She taught in public schools in Worcester, Massachusetts. She and two other teachers attended a national women's rights convention when it met in Worcester in 1850. In 1851, she published a book for young readers, The Cinderella Frock. She was still teaching school during the early part of the American Civil War.

== Wartime service ==
Perry served in the Union Army's Corps of Nurses under Dorothea Dix from April 15, 1863, to July 3, 1865, stationed at Fort Schuyler in New York, and at Balfour Hospital in Virginia. In addition to her direct nursing work, she wrote letters home to families, telling of a soldier's death. She wrote her reminiscences of her war work for Mary A. Gardner Holland's Our Army Nurses (Boston, 1897), including an incident when she distributed to the patients "some delicious home-made wine, which had been sent me from Massachusetts".

She contracted malaria during her work at the hospital, and its lasting effects meant that she could not work after the war. Her congressman, William W. Rice, recommended that she receive a federal pension for her service. She was granted a pension of $12 per month by an act of Congress, in 1887.

== After the war ==
Adeliza Perry donated two eighteenth-century items to the American Antiquarian Society in 1866. She returned to educational work; she taught school in Worcester from 1867, and through the 1870s. She published two more books after the war, A Windfall (1880) and The Schoolmaster's Trial (1881).

She died in 1901, aged 79 years, in Worcester. She was one of the four army nurses memorialized in a 1901 ceremony held by the Massachusetts Army Nurses Association in Boston, where Rev. Wilbur N. Mason eulogized, "Who can measure the influence of lives like these? Though of a younger generation, whose knowledge of the great rebellion is only from books, I count it a high and rare privilege to pay my halting tribute to those noble servants, whose lives were pure, ungrudging service of loyalty to their country and flag, and most of all to their great captain, Christ."
