= New Braintree, Massachusetts =

- Town
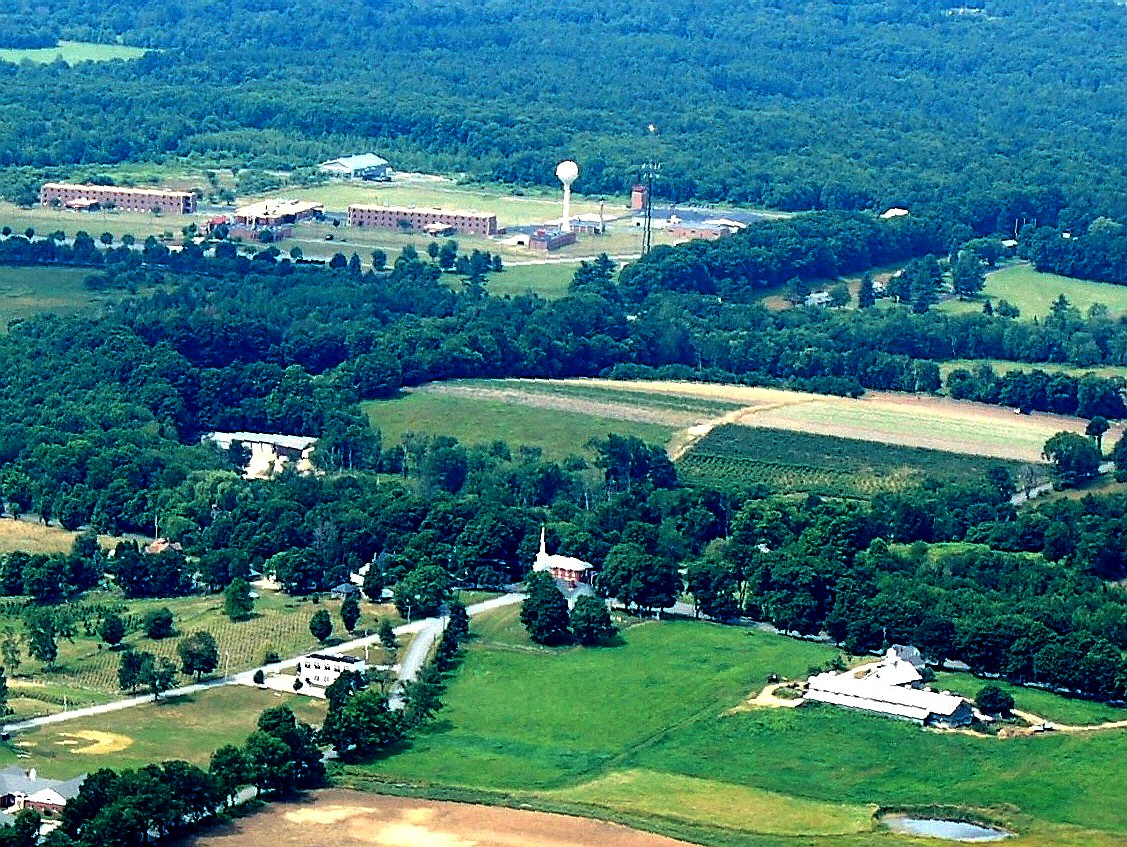
- New Braintree Center

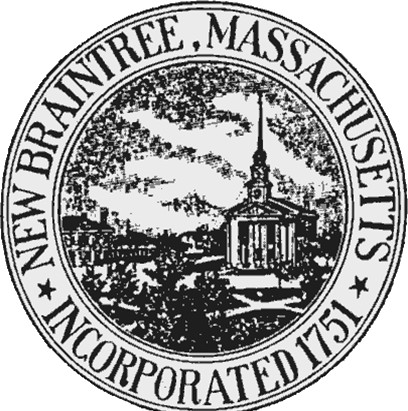
- Seal

- Location in Worcester County and the state of Massachusetts.
- Coordinates: 42°19′00″N 72°07′35″W
- Country: United States
- State: Massachusetts
- County: Worcester
- Settled: 1709
- Incorporated: 1775

Government
  - Type: Open town meeting

Area
  - Total: 20.8 sq mi (54.0 km^{2})
  - Land: 20.7 sq mi (53.6 km^{2})
  - Water: 0.15 sq mi (0.4 km^{2})
- Elevation: 945 ft (288 m)

Population (2020)
  - Total: 996
  - Density: 48.1/sq mi (18.6/km^{2})
- Time zone: UTC−5 (Eastern)
  - Summer (DST): UTC−4 (Eastern)
- ZIP Code: 01531
- Area code: 508 / 774
- FIPS code: 25-45105
- GNIS feature ID: 0619484
- Website: www.newbraintreema.us

New Braintree is a town in Worcester County, Massachusetts, United States. The population was 996 at the 2020 census.

== History ==
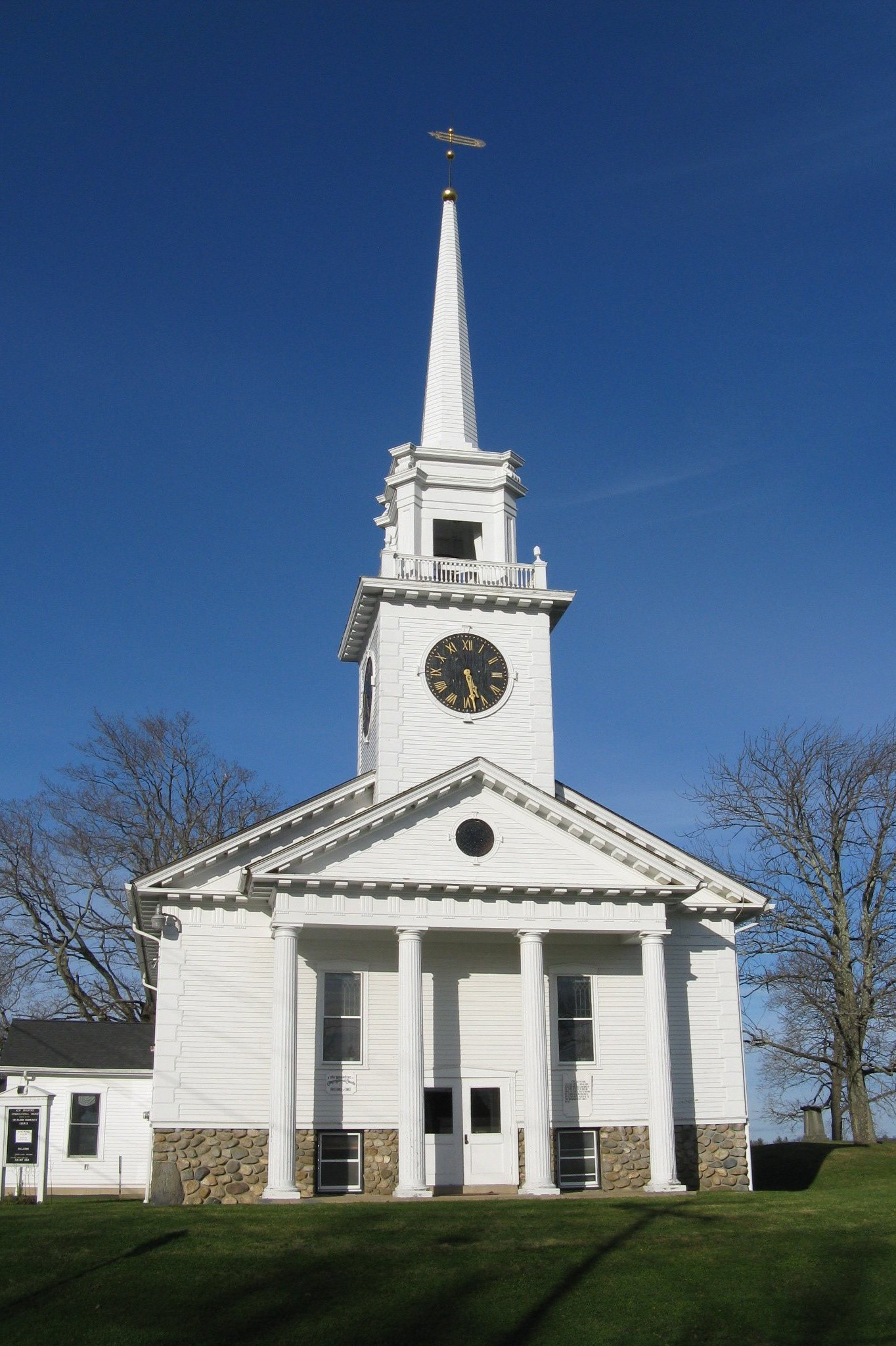
New Braintree Congregational Church

Before being settled by re-located residents of Braintree, Massachusetts, New Braintree was occupied by various Native American groups for at least 9,000 years. At the time of English colonization in the 17th century, the area was inhabited by Quaboag and Nipmuc people.

In 1660 the Massachusetts Bay Colony made a land grant establishing Quaboag Plantation, but it was not until 1665 that a deed was obtained by the English settlers from a native person named Shattoocquis for the land. In 1669, the town of Braintree, located southeast of Boston, voted that each household would be granted an equal interest in the 6000 acres purchased out of Quaboag Plantation to the west, to be known as "Braintree Farms".

In 1675 King Philip's War broke out between the English United Colonies and the Wampanoag, interrupting the plans of the Braintree settlers. As Native people retreated from praying towns and border regions with the English, present-day New Braintree became the site of a Nipmuc stronghold known as Menimesit or Wenimessit. That same year, a group of Nipmuc destroyed Quaboag plantation and routed a company of colonial soldiers in a battle in present-day New Braintree known as "Wheeler's Surprise." Menimesit was visited by major native leaders in the conflict, including King Philip himself, and it features in the captive narrative of Mary Rowlandson.

In the years following the war, additional tracts of land which were formerly part of Brookfield and Hardwick were acquired by the Braintree settlers. The land was recolonized by Europeans in 1709 and was officially incorporated in 1751 as New Braintree.

New Braintree has been the home of the Massachusetts State Police Academy since 1992. Governor Michael Dukakis had proposed and began construction of a controversial state prison in the late 1980s on this site, but was met with heavy opposition by the town, Boston-area radio talk show host Jerry Williams and a group called C.O.S.T. (Conserve Our Small Town). Governor William Weld was elected and ceased the construction of the prison. The state police training academy now occupies the grounds and buildings of the former Seventh-day Adventist Pioneer Valley Academy. In the photo shown, one can see the school's former boys' and girls' dormitories with the cafeteria in between and the water tower to the right of the boys' dormitory. The school opened its doors in September 1965 and closed in June 1983.

== Geography ==
According to the United States Census Bureau, the town has a total area of 20.9 square miles (54 km^{2}), of which 20.7 square miles (54 km^{2}) is land and 0.2 square miles (0.52 km^{2}), or 0.72%, is water.

New Braintree is bordered by Barre to the north, Oakham to the east, Spencer to the southeast, West Brookfield and North Brookfield to the south, Ware to the southwest, and Hardwick to the west.

New Braintree has a section of the Mass Central Rail Trail, a partially completed shared-use rail trail extending across Massachusetts between Northampton and Boston.

== Demographics ==
Historical population
Year	Pop.	±%
1790	939	—
1850	852	−9.3%
1860	805	−5.5%
1870	640	−20.5%
1880	610	−4.7%
1890	573	−6.1%
1900	500	−12.7%
1910	464	−7.2%
1920	394	−15.1%
1930	407	+3.3%
1940	439	+7.9%
1950	478	+8.9%
1960	509	+6.5%
1970	631	+24.0%
1980	671	+6.3%
1990	881	+31.3%
2000	927	+5.2%
2010	999	+7.8%
2020	996	−0.3%
2022*	990	−0.6%
* = population estimate. Source: United States census records and Population Estimates Program data.

As of the census of 2000, there were 927 people, 318 households, and 267 families residing in the town. The population density was 44.8 inhabitants per square mile (17.3/km^{2}). There were 328 housing units at an average density of 15.8 per square mile (6.1/km^{2}). The racial makeup of the town was 99.14% White, 0.22% African American, 0.11% Native American, 0.11% Asian, and 0.43% from two or more races. Hispanic or Latino of any race were 0.32% of the population.

There were 318 households, out of which 41.8% had children under the age of 18 living with them, 70.4% were married couples living together, 8.2% had a female householder with no husband present, and 16.0% were non-families. Of all households, 13.2% were made up of individuals, and 5.0% had someone living alone who was 65 years of age or older. The average household size was 2.92 and the average family size was 3.14.

In the town, the population was spread out, with 29.3% under the age of 18, 5.8% from 18 to 24, 29.7% from 25 to 44, 26.6% from 45 to 64, and 8.5% who were 65 years of age or older. The median age was 38 years. For every 100 females, there were 102.8 males. For every 100 females age 18 and over, there were 102.8 males.

The median income for a household in the town was $54,844, and the median income for a family was $60,417. Males had a median income of $41,477 versus $26,136 for females. The per capita income for the town was $21,072. About 4.0% of families and 4.6% of the population were below the poverty line, including 3.5% of those under age 18 and 2.6% of those age 65 or over.

Every September for the past 38 years the town has had a Country Fair in the Town Center.

== Education ==
New Braintree is part of the Quabbin Regional School District, along with Barre, Hardwick, Hubbardston, and Oakham. Elementary school students attend Hardwick Elementary School from grades K–6, middle school students attend Quabbin Regional Middle School from grades 7–8, and high school students attend Quabbin Regional High School from grades 9–12.

New Braintree was formerly the home of the Pioneer Valley Academy, which lasted from 1965 until 1983.

== Government ==
State government
State Representative(s):	Donnie Berthiaume (R)
State Senator(s):	Anne M. Gobi (D)
Governor's Councilor(s):	Jen Caissie (R)
Federal government
U.S. Representative(s):	James P. McGovern (D-2nd District),
U.S. Senators:	Elizabeth Warren (D), Ed Markey (D)

== Notable people ==
- Charles Allen, politician, established a law practice in New Braintree
- Alexander De Witt, politician
- Charles Delano, politician
- Francis Roach Delano, politician
- Charles Eames, diplomat
- Jonathan Fisher, minister
- Edwards W. Fiske, politician
- Henry H. Kendall, architect
- Calvin Pollard, architect
- Rufus Putnam, military officer, lived in New Braintree
