= Joseph Goodhue Chandler =

American painter

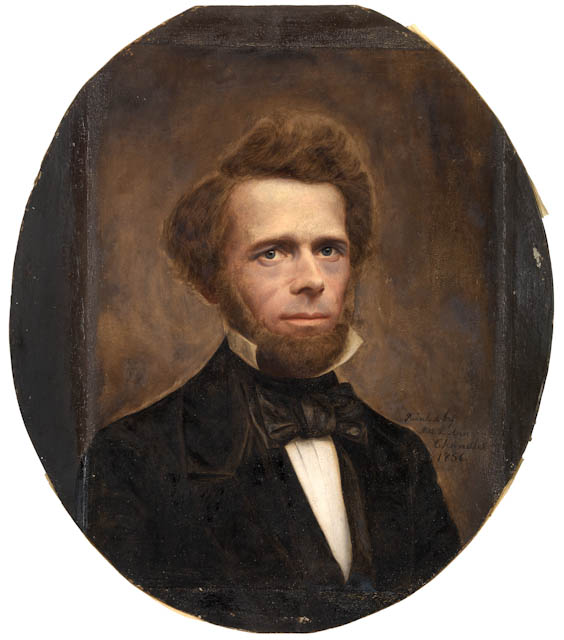
- portrait by his wife, Lucretia Ann Waite Chandler, 1856
- Born: October 3, 1813
- Died: October 27, 1884 (aged 71)
- Occupation: Painter
- Spouse(s): Lucretia Waite Chandler

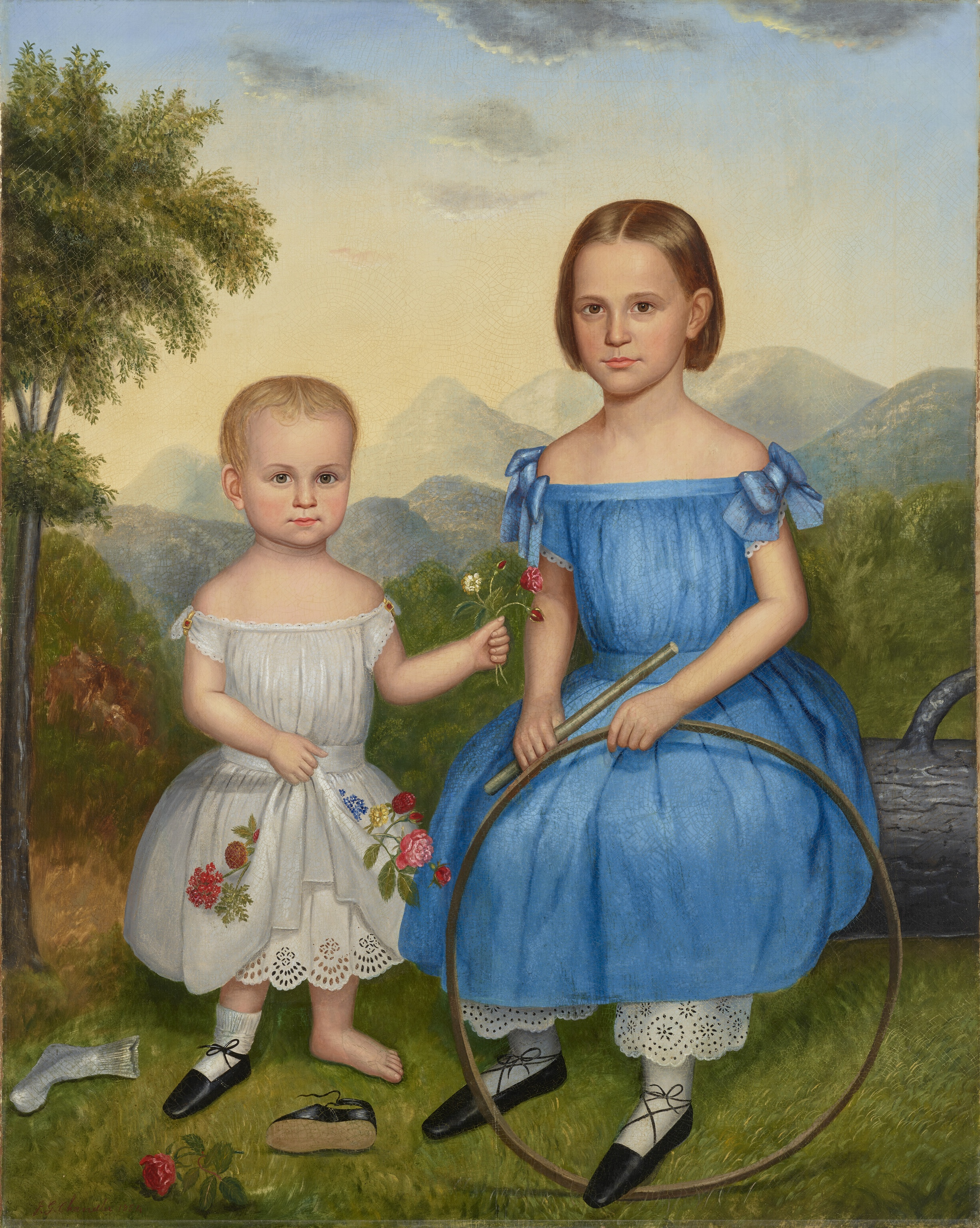
Portrait of Fannie and Ella Graves, 1854, by Joseph Goodhue Chandler

Joseph Goodhue Chandler (October 8, 1813 – October 27, 1884) was an American portrait painter, active in New England.

Chandler was born in South Hadley, Massachusetts. He trained first as a cabinetmaker; later, at some time between the ages of 14 and 19, he traveled to Albany, New York, where he studied painting with William Collins. His earliest known portraits date from 1837 and are mainly of family members. Following his father's death, he bought his brother's share of the family farm and supplemented his income by land management. In 1840 Chandler married Lucretia Ann Waite (1820–1868), an established painter from Hubbardston, Massachusetts. A descendant reported that Lucretia "finished up" her husband's paintings, and the two artists probably collaborated on several portraits. Soon after his marriage, Chandler began his career as an itinerant painter, traveling principally in northwestern Massachusetts until he established a studio in Boston in 1852. In 1860 the Chandlers returned to Hubbardston, where they spent the rest of their lives. Chandler died in 1884, and is buried in the Greenwood Cemetery.
