= Gilbertville, Massachusetts =

Village in Massachusetts, United States

Coordinates: 42°18′43″N 72°12′28″W

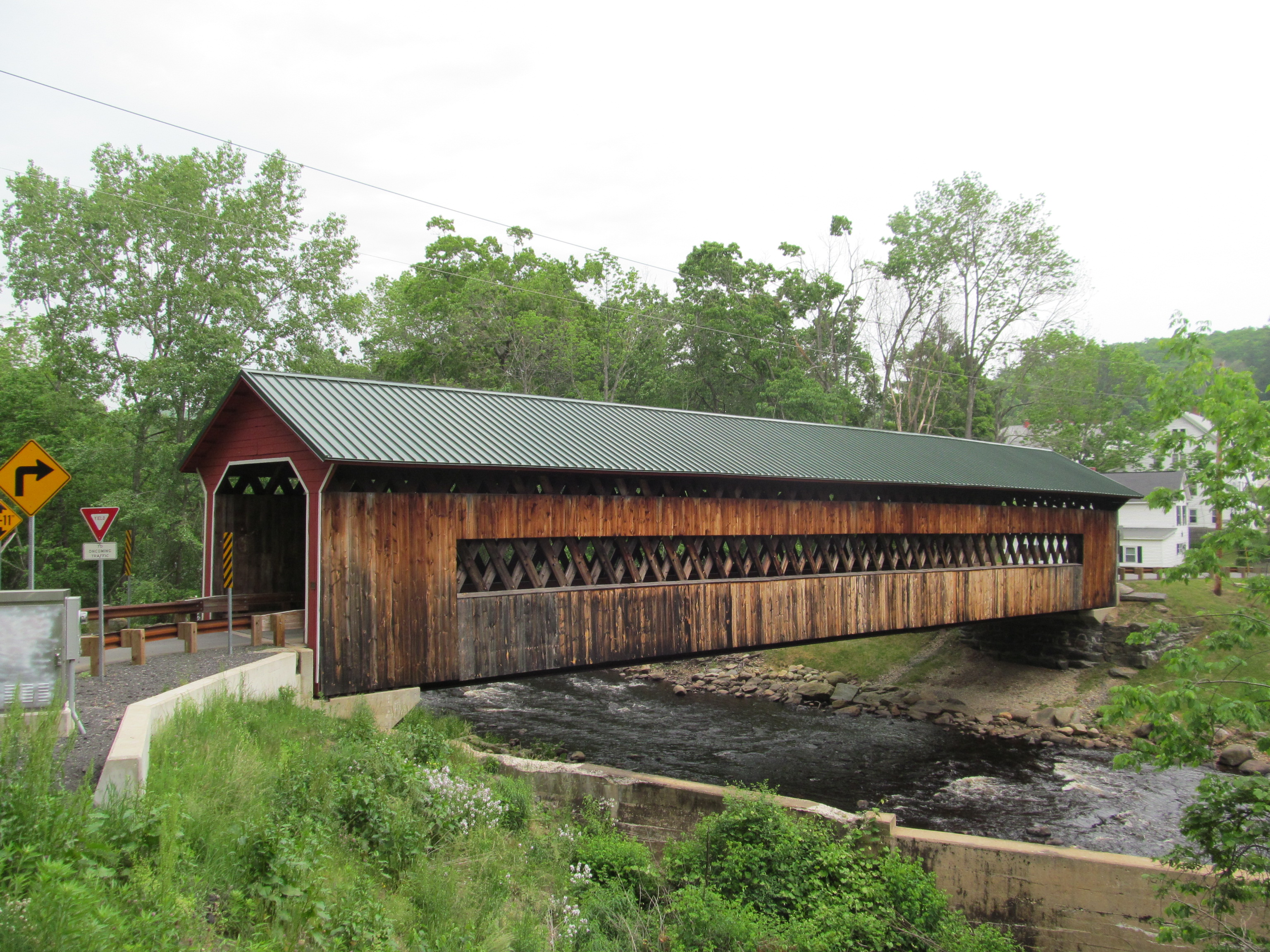
Ware–Hardwick Covered Bridge

Gilbertville is an unincorporated village in the town of Hardwick, Worcester County, Massachusetts, United States, approximately 20 miles west of the city of Worcester. The Gilbertville Historic District and Ware–Hardwick Covered Bridge, which traverses the Ware River, are within the village. The ZIP Code for Gilbertville is 01031.

== Climate ==
In a typical year, Gilbertville, Massachusetts temperatures fall below 50 °F (10 °C) for 195 days per year. Annual precipitation in Gilbertville is typically 44.5 inches per year (high in the US) and snow covers the ground 62 days per year or 17.0% of the year (high in the US). It may be helpful to understand the yearly precipitation by imagining nine straight days of moderate rain per year. The humidity in Gilbertville is below 60% for approximately 25.4 days, or 7.0% of the year.

== Notable person ==
- William A. Hickey - Catholic bishop
