= Wheelwright, Massachusetts =

Village in Massachusetts, United States

Coordinates: 42°21′10″N 72°08′22″W

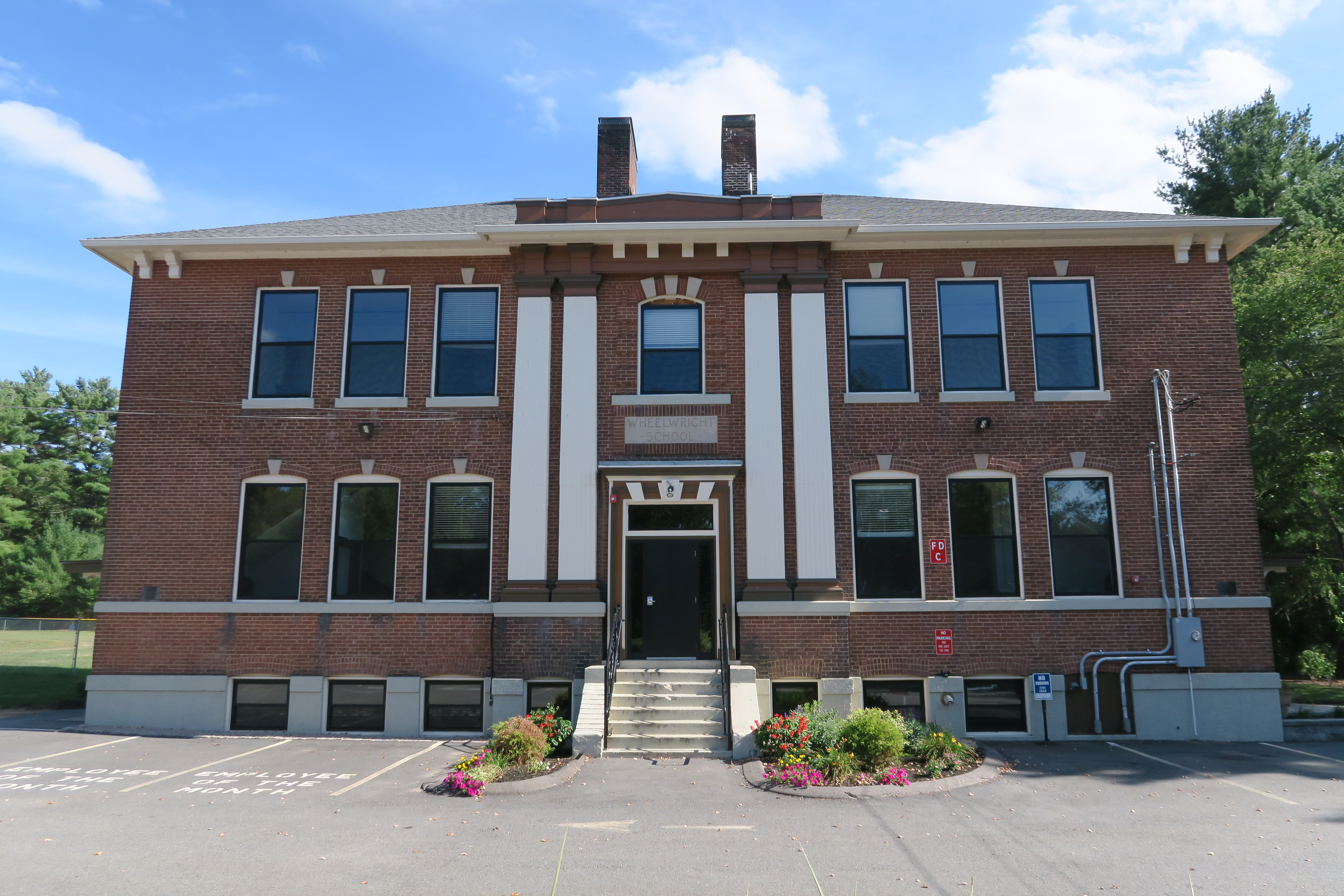
Wheelwright School

Wheelwright is a village in the town of Hardwick, Worcester County, Massachusetts, United States, approximately 20 miles (32 km) northwest of the city of Worcester. It is named after George W. Wheelwright, who owned the village's paper mill around the turn of the 20th century. The village is mostly residential now. There is a small plastics manufacturing shop on the mill site.

The village's zip code is 01094.
