= Quabbin Aqueduct =

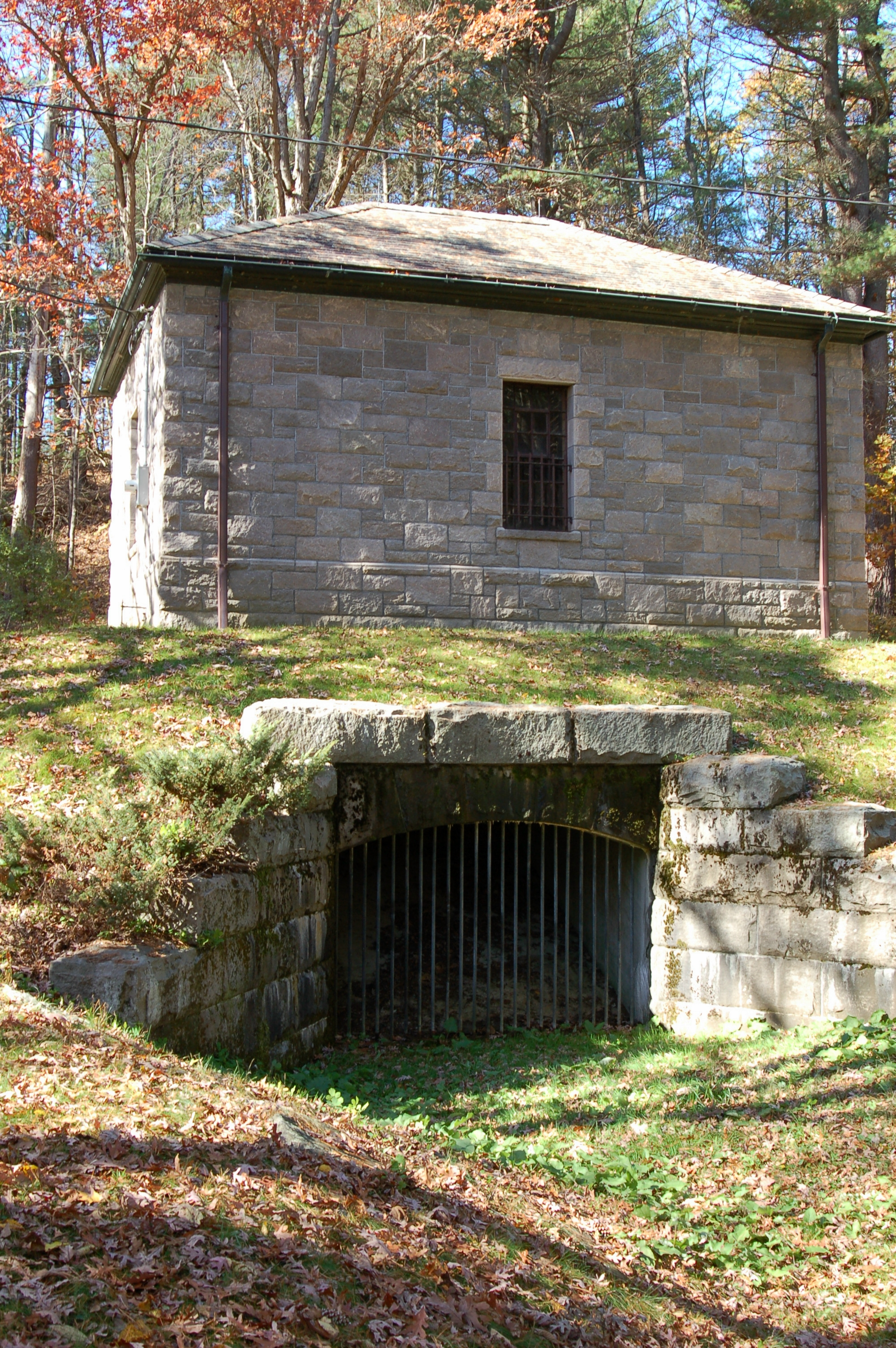
- Quabbin Aqueduct shaft two in South Barre
- Coordinates: 42°23′12″N 71°48′08″W
- Begins: Quabbin Reservoir
- Ends: Wachusett Reservoir
- Official name: Quabbin Aqueduct
- Maintained by: MWRA

Characteristics
- Total length: 24.6 mi (39.6 km)
- Width: 11 ft (3.4 m)
- Height: 12.75 ft (3.9 m)
- Capacity: 400 cu ft/s (11.3 m^{3}/s)

History
- Construction start: 1926
- Opened: 1933

The Quabbin Aqueduct carries water from the Quabbin Reservoir to the Wachusett Reservoir. It is part of the Eastern Massachusetts public water supply system, maintained by the Massachusetts Water Resources Authority (MWRA). At 25 miles (40 km) in length, it is one of the longest aqueduct tunnels in the world.

== Physical characteristics ==
Water from the 412-billion-US-gallon (1.56×10^{9} m^{3}) capacity Quabbin Reservoir flows through the Quabbin Aqueduct from the northeast side of the Quabbin, up a slope to the Ware River Diversion in South Barre, Massachusetts, down again to the Wachusett Reservoir, and then through a power station near the Oakdale section of West Boylston, Massachusetts. This upward and downward flow occurs by natural siphon action, with the high point in the siphon being at the Ware River Diversion. The water surface at the Quabbin Reservoir is about 524 feet (160 m) above Mean Sea Level (MSL). The water surface at the Wachusett Reservoir is about 384 feet (117 m) above MSL, and the water surface at the Ware River Diversion is about 660 feet (200 m) higher than MSL.

== Novelty ==
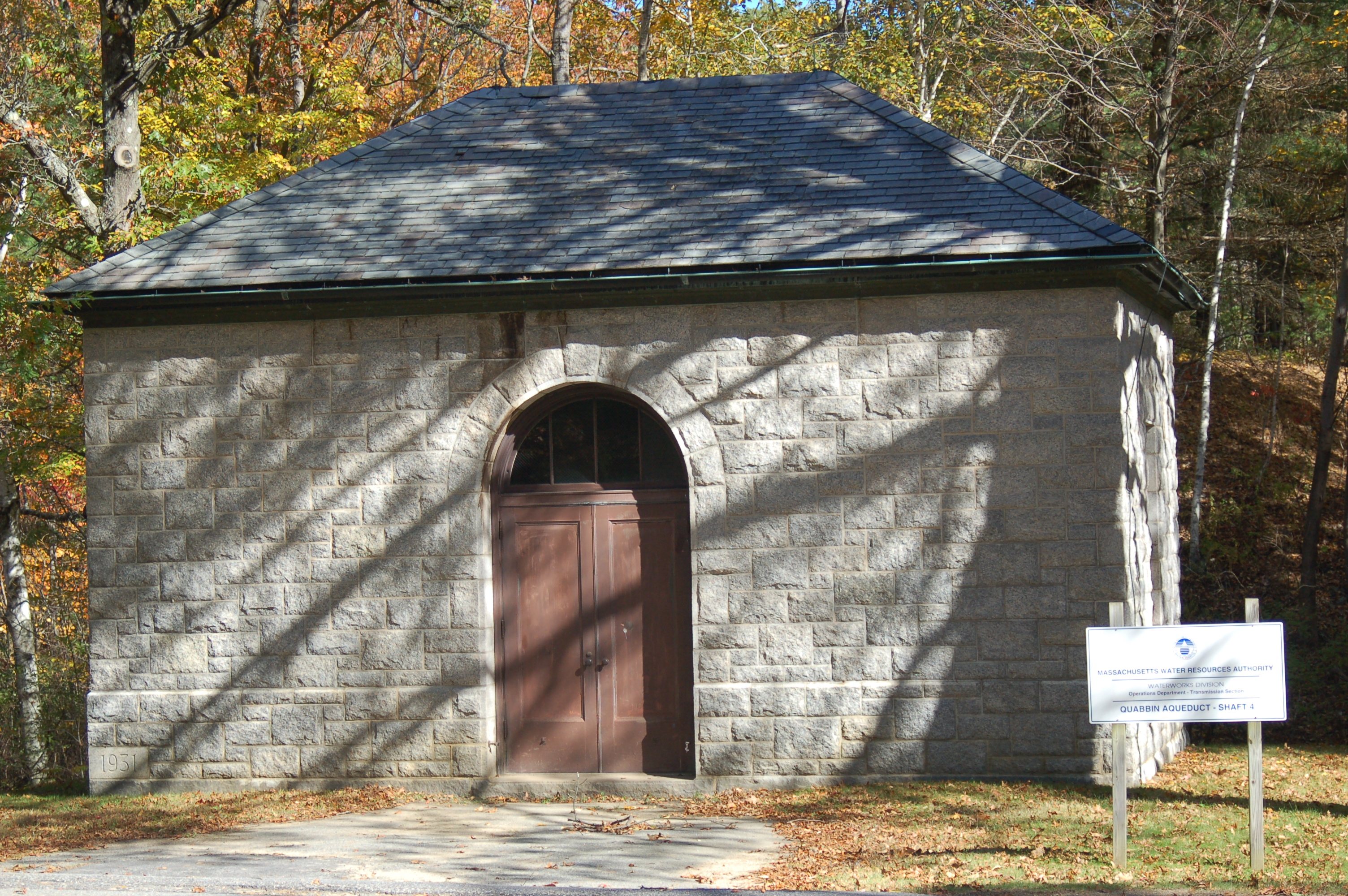
Quabbin Aqueduct shaft four at Holden

A natural siphon can only lift water about 30 feet (9.1 m), with the aqueduct located several hundred feet underground in places – however the water head is only about 25 feet (7.6 m) on the suction side of the aqueduct. Portions of the aqueduct follow the route of the Ware River Railway that was discontinued with the building of the Quabbin Reservoir. The siphon starts at the Ware River Diversion by feeding the river water into the aqueduct. If the aqueduct branch which travels to the Wachusett Reservoir (the Wachusett-Coldbrook branch) is closed, then Ware River water feeds into the Quabbin Reservoir for storage; however, if the Wachusett branch is open, then water flows into both the Quabbin and Wachusett Reservoirs. When the Wachusett branch begins to create sufficient suction as it fills, then the Ware River Diversion inlet is closed and water flows from the Quabbin to the Wachusett Reservoir as a natural siphon.

== See also ==
- Quabbin Reservoir
- Aqueduct (water supply)
- Tunnel
- Lists of tunnels
