= Jonas Gilman Clark =

American businessman (1815–1900)

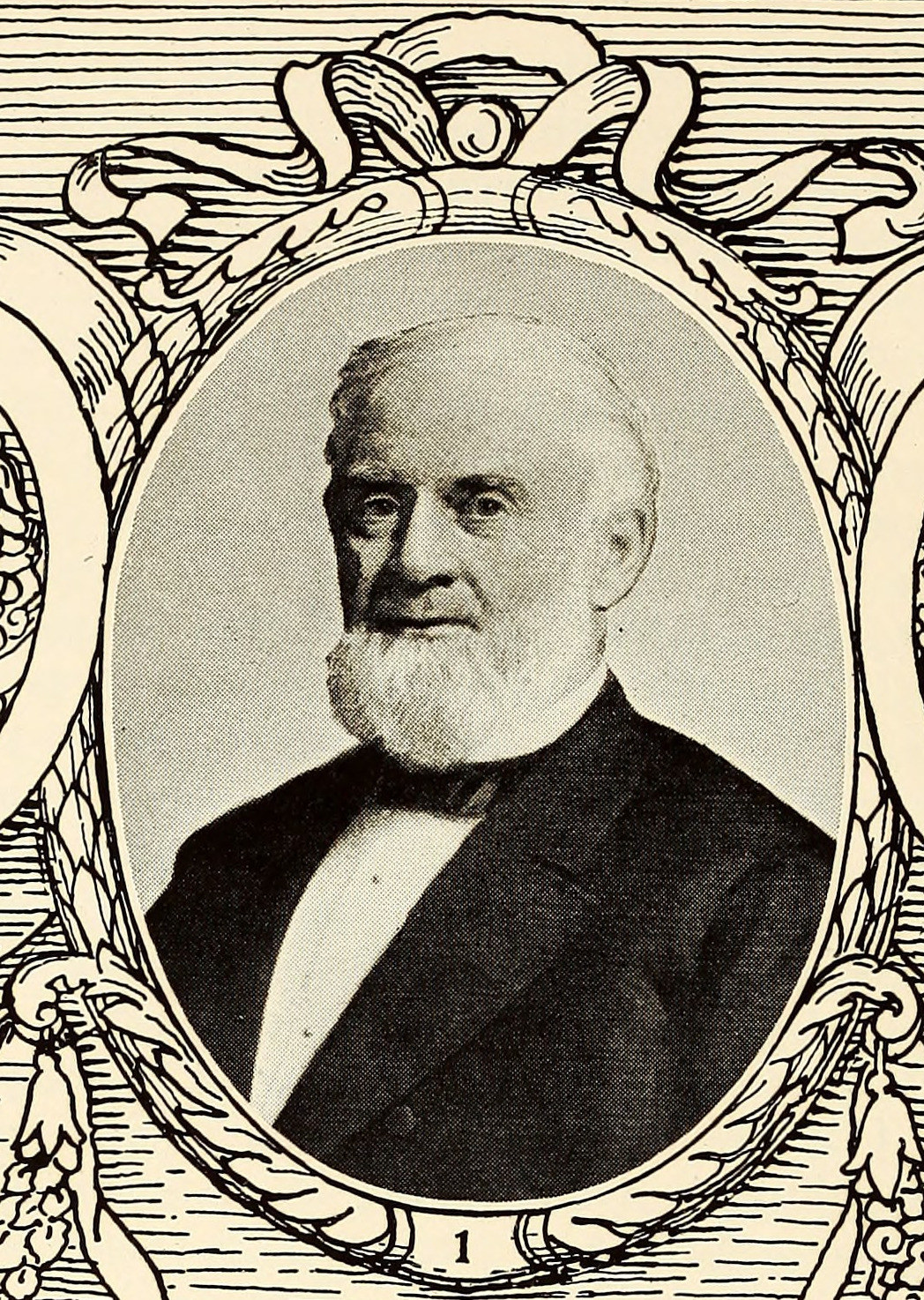
- Born: February 1, 1815; Hubbardston, Massachusetts
- Died: May 23, 1900 (aged 85); Worcester, Massachusetts
- Occupation: Businessman
- Known for: founding Clark University in 1887

Jonas Gilman Clark (February 1, 1815 – May 23, 1900) was an American businessman, and the founder of Clark University. He started his business career in Massachusetts, before moving to California in the 1850s. After a successful entrepreneurial career, he moved to Worcester in 1878, and founded Clark University in 1887.

== Biography ==
=== Early life ===
Clark was born in Hubbardston, Massachusetts. He was a son of a farmer, and received a common school education. He became a carriage-maker at the age of sixteen, and opened his own carriage shop after five years. He extended his business to the manufacturing and marketing of chairs. He entered the tinware industry after discovering the greater profitability in this business around 1845. He was also a manager of retail stores in Hubbardston, Milford and Lowell.

Clark married Susan Wright (1816–1904) in 1836; she was his childhood friend and neighbor. The couple were active supporters of the anti-slavery movement.

=== Life in California, New York City, and Worcester ===
Clark sold his hardware business to his brothers, and moved to California. His first business venture there was not successful because he lost money due the ineptitude of his partner. He formed a second partnership, and in 1853 went to San Francisco to run his business. He achieved success in the furniture business. In 1860, Clark liquidated his businesses due to medical reasons. He reinvested his fortune in the San Francisco area, particularly in real estate, where he owned the Rancho Arroyo de la Alameda. Other investments included the Spring Valley Water Company. When the American Civil War began, Clark supported the Union government; he was active in multiple Union causes. In 1868, he purchased a mansion on Fifth Avenue in New York City. He also started collecting rare books and art works while also investing in securities and real estate. He made trips to Europe. He developed a deep interest in higher education; he visited and collected information about the universities in Europe. In 1864, Clark moved to Boston, where his investments included the Studio Building.

Clark and his wife, Susan, shifted to Worcester in 1878. He started to liquidate his California and New York area holdings in the early 1880s. He served on the board of the Providence and Worcester Railroad. He started collecting a compact plot of land in the growing South End of Worcester in 1881. He had acquired most of a block that bordered Main Street by the fall of 1885.

=== Clark University ===
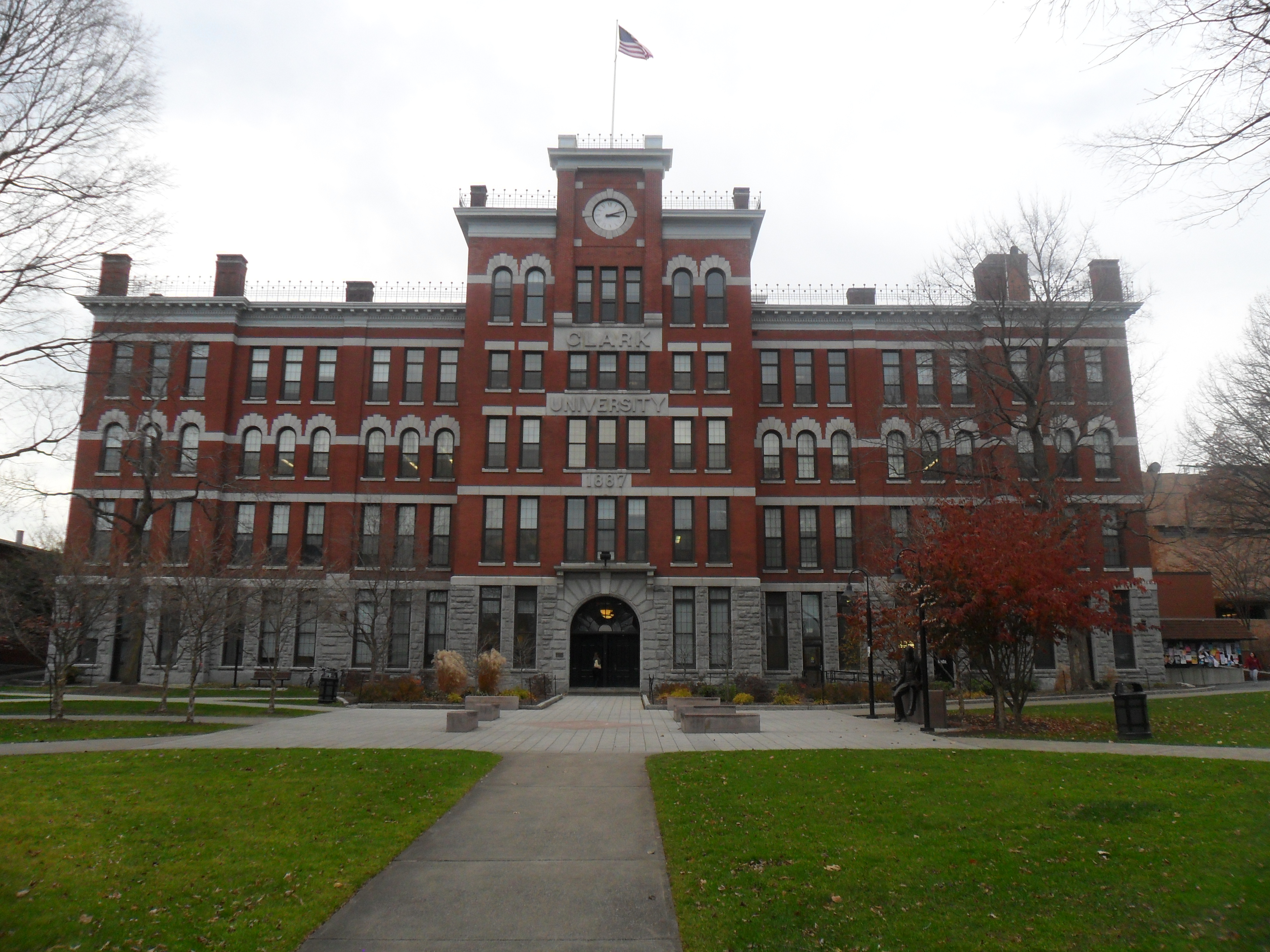
Front entrance to Clark University's Jonas Clark Hall, the main academic facility for undergraduate students.

Clark founded Clark University in 1887. He was probably inspired by his friend Leland Stanford to establish his own university. In January 1887, Clark secured from the Legislature, for himself and associates of his choice, an act of incorporation under the name of Clark University. On March 31, the legislation was passed and signed. On May 4, at the first regular meeting of the Board of Trustees, Clark disclosed his educational and financial plans for the new university. Clark University was to incorporate the best features of the continental European and American universities such as Cornell University and Johns Hopkins University.

Clark started the university with a million dollars, and later added another million dollars to the fund because he feared the university would run out someday. He and other trustees hired G. Stanley Hall as the first president of Clark University. Hall wanted to start the graduate school and library first, and he persuaded Clark and other trustees that the undergraduate college would be started after a few years. The university was opened on October 2, 1889, as the first all-graduate university in the United States. It opened with graduate departments in physics, chemistry, biology, mathematics, and psychology.

Hall made multiple promises to the faculty of Clark University, but was unable to fulfill them. He blamed Jonas Clark or the trustees for his unfulfilled promises, and also misled Clark about the financial aspects of Clark University. Jonas Clark wanted the undergraduate college, but Hall did not want it. As a result of these conflicts, Clark did not trust Hall.

Clark University suffered from financial problems. Jonas Clark expressed his disappointment toward the affluent trustees, and to some extent the Worcester community, for not coming forward to support the university to Hall and the trustees, before leaving for Europe in 1891; he warned to reduce expenses if the public did not give more support to the university. He resigned as treasurer, but remained president of the board of trustees. From this point forward, Clark talked with Hall and the board particularly through letters; he also did not spend much time in Worcester.

The trustees did not build the undergraduate college, something that Clark wanted, but they continued to appeal to him to financially support the university.

In 1892 Clark and multiple trustees held various discussions on how to salvage the remaining assets of Clark University. Clark wanted an undergraduate college, but Hall rejected his wish. Clark wanted the university to be a traditional undergraduate institution, while Hall wanted it to be a graduate institution. Hall and the trustees wanted to keep Clark happy until his death; after Clark's death they could use his money according to their wishes.

Clark gave money to the university for the academic year 1892–93, but gave no more financial support to the university from this point forward. He realized that Hall and the trustees would not start the undergraduate college. His will, drafted in New York City, was kept secret from Hall and the trustees.

Clark died on May 23, 1900, at his home in Worcester. After his death, when the conditions of his will became known, the trustees discovered that they would have to establish an undergraduate college or else they would lose the remainder of Clark's fortune. The college was established, and it merged with the university in 1920 after Hall's retirement.
