= Old Furnace, Massachusetts =

Village in Massachusetts, United States

Coordinates: 42°20′44″N 72°11′18″W

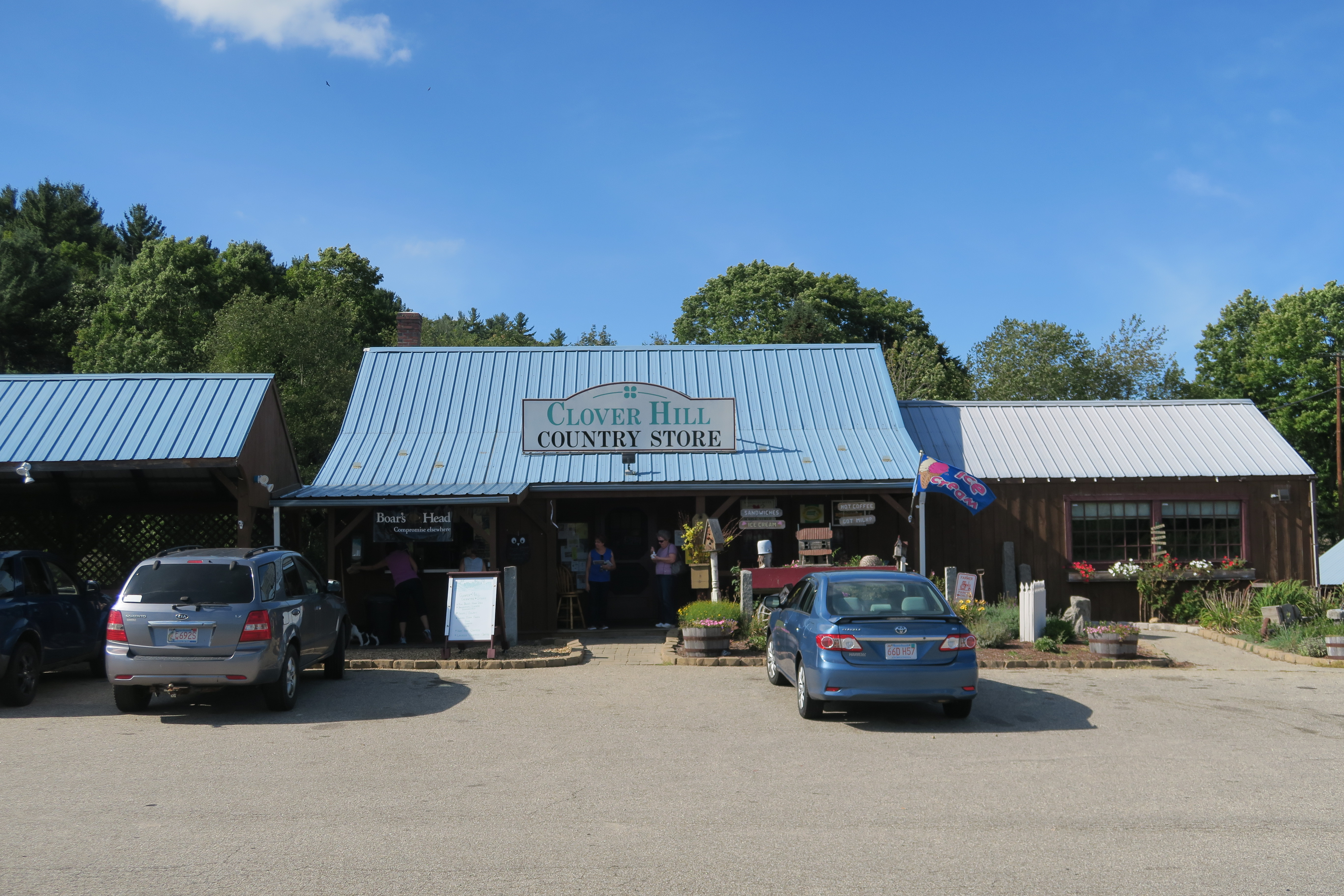
Clover Hill Country Store

Old Furnace is a village in the town of Hardwick, Worcester County, Massachusetts, United States, approximately 20 miles northwest of the city of Worcester.
