= Hubbardston, Massachusetts =

- Town
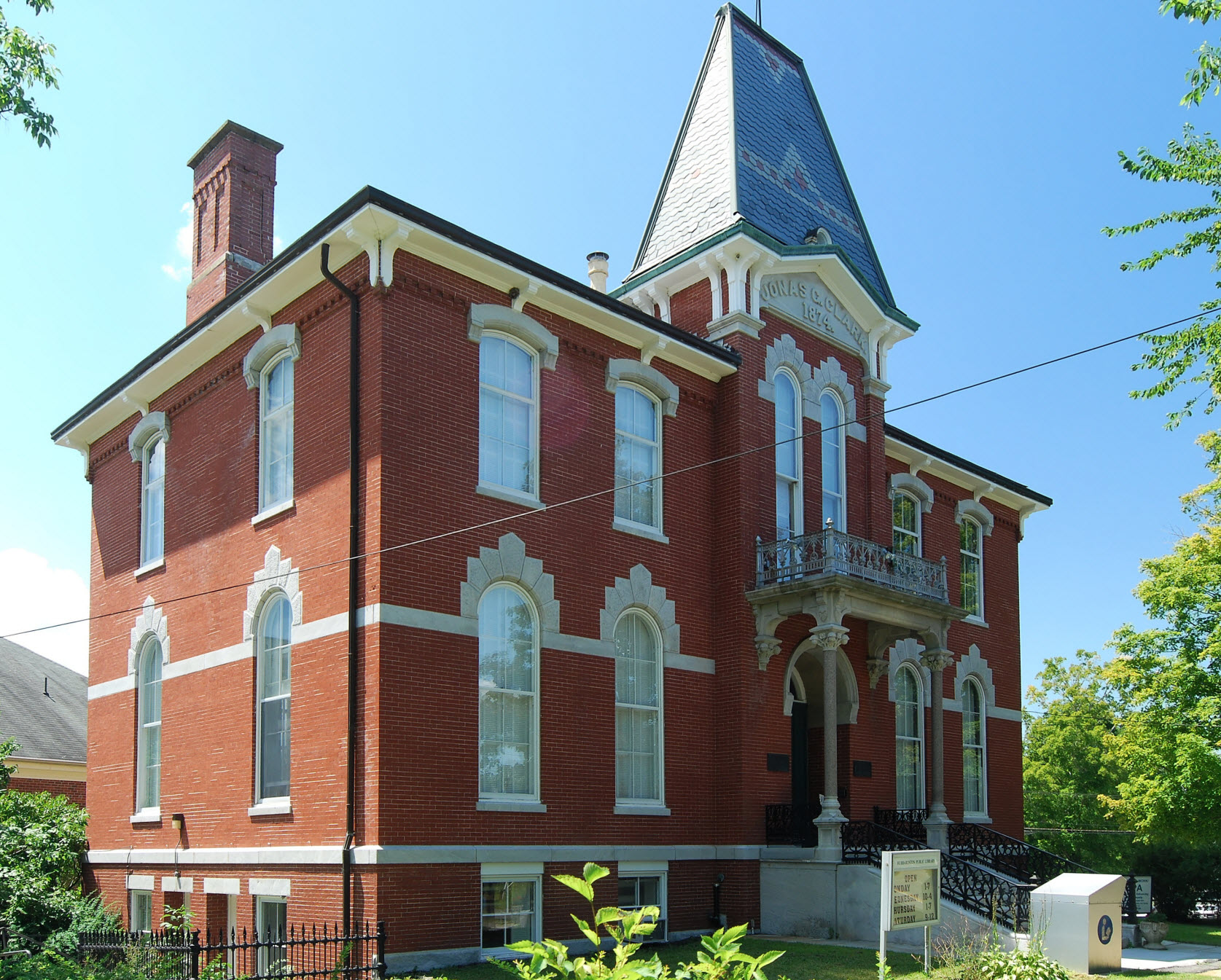
- Hubbardston Library

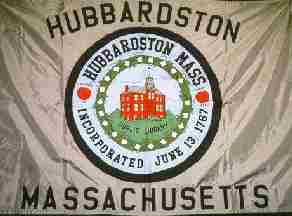
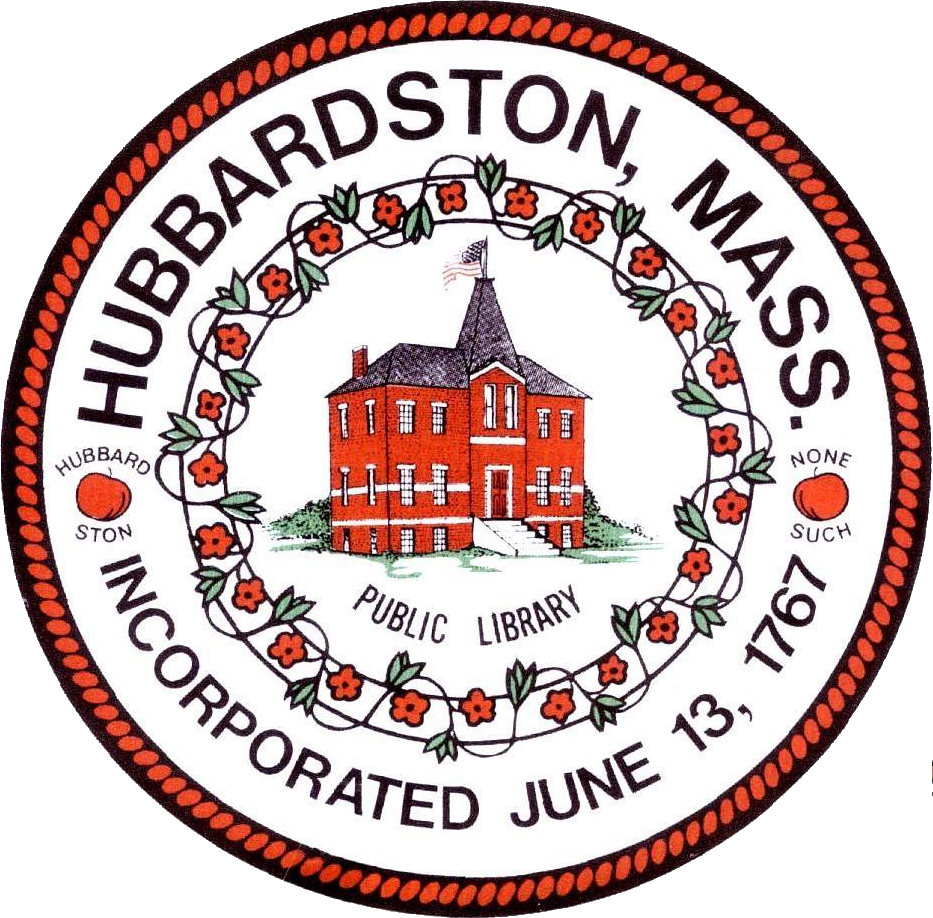
- Flag Seal

- Location in Worcester County and the state of Massachusetts.

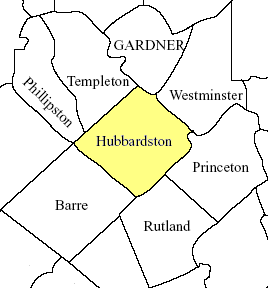
- Detail of Worcester County map
- Coordinates: 42°28′25″N 72°00′24″W
- Country: United States
- State: Massachusetts
- County: Worcester
- Settled: 1737
- Incorporated: 1767

Government
  - Type: Open town meeting

Area
  - Total: 42.0 sq mi (108.7 km^{2})
  - Land: 41.0 sq mi (106.3 km^{2})
  - Water: 0.93 sq mi (2.4 km^{2})
- Elevation: 994 ft (303 m)

Population (2020)
  - Total: 4,328
  - Density: 105.5/sq mi (40.71/km^{2})
- Time zone: UTC−5 (Eastern)
  - Summer (DST): UTC−4 (Eastern)
- ZIP Code: 01452
- Area code: 351 / 978
- FIPS code: 25-31435
- GNIS feature ID: 0618367
- Website: https://www.hubbardstonma.gov/

Hubbardston is a town in Worcester County, Massachusetts, United States. As of the 2020 U.S. census, the town population was 4,328. It is situated 18 miles north of Worcester and 53 miles west of Boston; it is distinguished in Massachusetts by being unusually high, at 1015 feet above sea level.

== History ==
Hubbardston, the "Northeast Quarter" of Rutland, was incorporated as a separate district in 1767 and named for Thomas Hubbard (1702–1773), Commissary General of the Province of Massachusetts and Treasurer of Harvard College. It is reported in local history that in view of the honor of giving his name to the town, Hubbard promised to provide the glass for the windows of the first meeting house built in town. To make his liberality more conspicuous, the people planned for extra windows, but when Hubbard died in 1773, his estate was so complicated that the town of Hubbardston received nothing and was obliged to glaze the windows at its own expense.

In 1737 Eleazer Brown located on a farm of 60 acres given him by the proprietors of Rutland on the condition that he operate a public house or inn. Until 1746, Brown and his wife were the only inhabitants of Hubbardston. After Eleazer's death (reportedly killed by a deer), Mrs. Brown was then the only occupant of town for several years, and she kept the public house for prominent travelers. In 1749, Israel Green moved into Hubbardston. His daughter, Molly Green, is reported to be the first child born in Hubbardston. Mr. Green was the first chairman of the board of selectmen.

The town's early economy was based on agriculture and small-scale chair, boot, and shoe manufacturing. It is described by historians as a poor town, sparsely settled and almost wholly agricultural, but having sawmills, potash works, and cottage industries such as the making of palm-leaf hats. By the 19th century, dairy and berry farming and market gardening were major pursuits in the town. Immigrants from Ireland, French Canada, England, Sweden, and Finland moved to town to work on local farms.

Hubbardston was represented by 65 men during the Revolutionary War.

Captain Adam Wheeler, one of the leaders of Shays' Rebellion, an armed uprising in central and western Massachusetts, was from Hubbardston. In 1786, eighty men from the town marched to Worcester under Wheeler's command and, joining hundreds of other farmers, took control of the courthouse to protest the widespread foreclosures and seizures of property by creditors that occurred during the cash-poor 18th century.

Hubbardston furnished 164 men during the Civil War. Forty-four were killed or died of illness.

Hubbardston is home to the invention of the first backhoe swing frame, developed in July 1947 by Vaino J. Holopainen (pronounced "Waino") and Roy E. Handy, Jr., (thus the company name "Wain-Roy") and assigned to Wain-Roy Corporation of Hubbardston. In July 1948, patent # 2,698,697 was filed by Vaino J. Holopainen.

== Geography ==
According to the United States Census Bureau, the town has a total area of 42.0 square miles (109 km^{2}), of which 41.0 square miles (106 km^{2}) is land and 0.9 square miles (2.3 km^{2}), or 2.19%, is water. Hubbardston is bounded on the northwest by Phillipston and Templeton, on the northeast by Gardner and Westminster, on the southeast by Princeton and Rutland, and on the southwest by Barre.

== Demographics ==
Historical population
Year	Pop.	±%
1790	934	—
1850	1,825	+95.4%
1860	1,621	−11.2%
1870	1,654	+2.0%
1880	1,380	−16.6%
1890	1,346	−2.5%
1900	1,227	−8.8%
1910	1,073	−12.6%
1920	1,045	−2.6%
1930	1,010	−3.3%
1940	1,022	+1.2%
1950	1,134	+11.0%
1960	1,217	+7.3%
1970	1,437	+18.1%
1980	1,797	+25.1%
1990	2,797	+55.6%
2000	3,909	+39.8%
2010	4,382	+12.1%
2020	4,328	−1.2%
2022*	4,335	+0.2%
* = population estimate. Source: United States census records and Population Estimates Program data.

As of the census of 2000, there were 3,909 people, 1,308 households, and 1,071 families residing in the town. The population density was 95.3 inhabitants per square mile (36.8/km^{2}). There were 1,360 housing units at an average density of 33.1 per square mile (12.8/km^{2}). The racial makeup of the town was 98.39% White, 0.15% African American, 0.08% Native American, 0.49% Asian, 0.28% from other races, and 0.61% from two or more races. Hispanic or Latino of any race were 1.33% of the population.

There were 1,308 households, out of which 43.8% had children under the age of 18 living with them, 73.2% were married couples living together, 5.4% had a female householder with no husband present, and 18.1% were non-families. 13.7% of all households were made up of individuals, and 4.5% had someone living alone who was 65 years of age or older. The average household size was 2.97 and the average family size was 3.28.

In the town, the population was spread out, with 31.1% under the age of 18, 4.8% from 18 to 24, 34.6% from 25 to 44, 22.6% from 45 to 64, and 6.9% who were 65 years of age or older. The median age was 36 years. For every 100 females, there were 102.3 males. For every 100 females age 18 and over, there were 100.9 males.

The median income for a household in the town was $61,462, and the median income for a family was $66,058. Males had a median income of $48,730 versus $33,654 for females. The per capita income for the town was $23,072. About 2.1% of families and 3.7% of the population were below the poverty line, including 3.4% of those under the age of 18 and 7.9% of those 65 and older.

== Education ==
Hubbardson is part of the Quabbin Regional School District along with Barre, Hardwick, New Braintree, and Oakham. Elementary school students attend Hubbardston Center School, from grades K to 5, while middle school students attend Quabbin Regional Middle School from grades 6 to 8, and high school students attend Quabbin Regional High School from grades 9 to 12. Starting the 2020–2021 School year, grade 6 was moved up to the Quabbin Regional Middle School.

== Notable people ==
- Joseph Goodhue Chandler
- Jonas Gilman Clark
- DeLorean Time Machine; currently being displayed in Hubbardston
- Ethan Allen Greenwood
- Eliphalet Stone

== Government ==
State government
State Representative(s):	Donald Berthiamume (R)
State Senator(s):	Anne Gobi (D)
Governor's Councilor(s):	Jen Caissie (R)
Federal government
U.S. Representative(s):	James P. McGovern (D-2nd District),
U.S. Senators:	Elizabeth Warren (D), Ed Markey (D)

== See also ==
- Hubbardston Public Library
