= Oakham, Massachusetts =

- Town
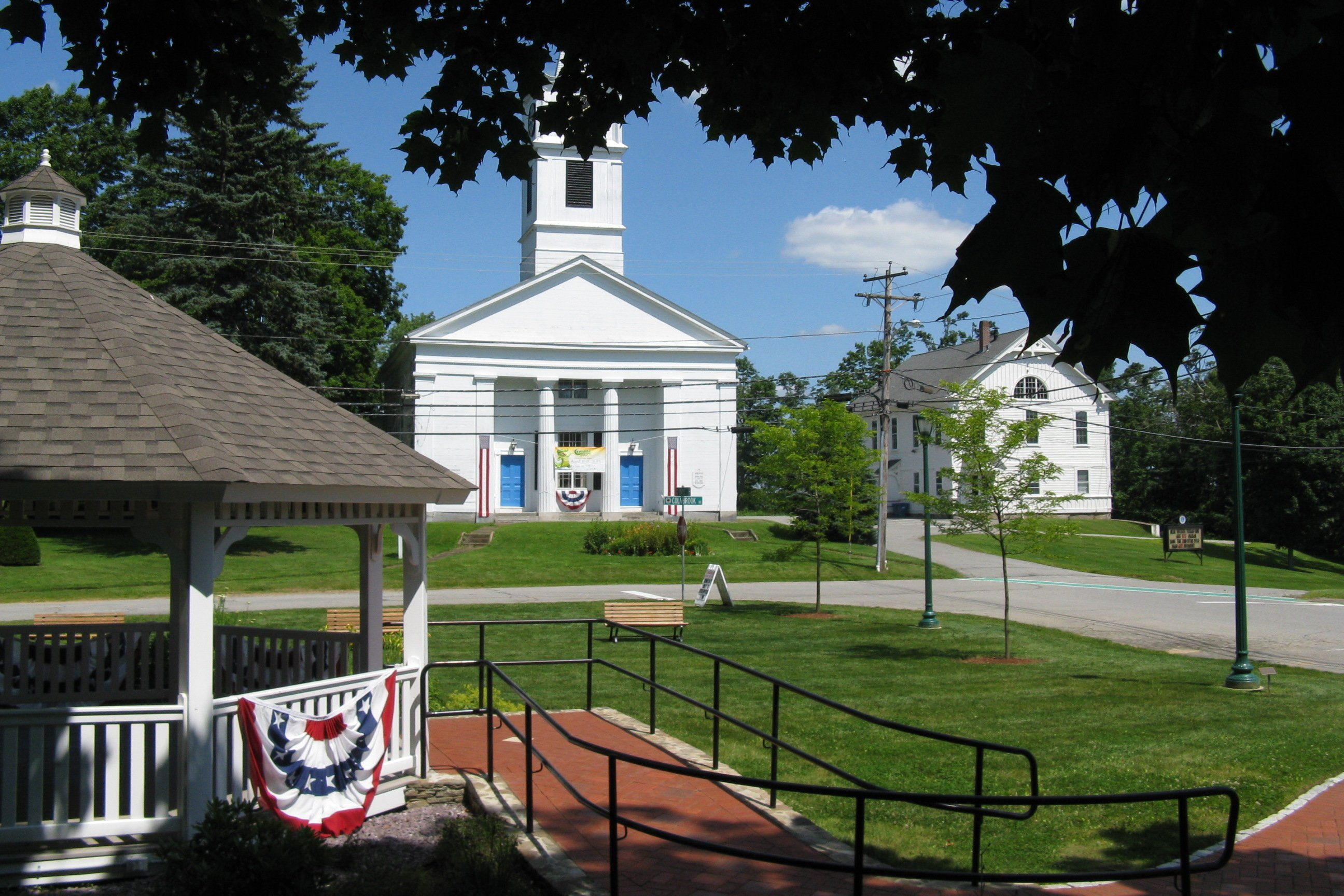
- Town Center

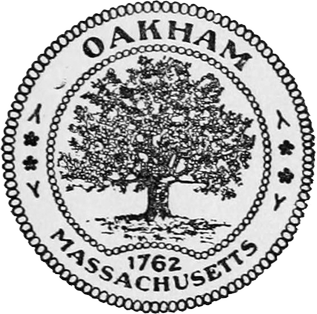
- Seal

- Location in Worcester County and the state of Massachusetts.
- Coordinates: 42°21′10″N 72°02′45″W
- Country: United States
- State: Massachusetts
- County: Worcester
- Settled: 1749
- Incorporated: 1775

Government
  - Type: Open town meeting

Area
  - Total: 21.5 sq mi (55.8 km^{2})
  - Land: 21.1 sq mi (54.7 km^{2})
  - Water: 0.42 sq mi (1.1 km^{2})
- Elevation: 1,050 ft (320 m)

Population (2020)
  - Total: 1,851
  - Density: 87.6/sq mi (33.8/km^{2})
- Time zone: UTC-5 (Eastern)
  - Summer (DST): UTC-4 (Eastern)
- ZIP code: 01068
- Area code: 508 / 774
- FIPS code: 25-50670
- GNIS feature ID: 0618378
- Website: www.oakham-ma.gov

Oakham is a town in Worcester County, Massachusetts, United States. The population was 1,851 at the 2020 census.

== History ==
Oakham was first settled by British colonists in 1749 as part of Rutland, and was officially incorporated in 1762. It was originally named Oakhampton, but the name was changed for an unknown reason.

The village of Coldbrook Springs was a part of Oakham, near the Barre line, established on the site of a natural iron spring. A railroad depot was built in nearby in the 1830s and the village eventually included a hotel, tavern, medicinal spa, and a number of houses. The area is part of the Ware River Watershed and now part of the Massachusetts state forest, having been cleared of all structures as a part of the Quabbin Reservoir Aqueduct system.

Residents of Oakham are known as "Oakhamites."

== Geography ==
According to the United States Census Bureau, the town has a total area of 21.5 square miles (56 km^{2}), of which 21.1 square miles (55 km^{2}) is land and 0.4 square miles (1.0 km^{2}), or 1.90%, is water.

Oakham is bordered by Barre to the northwest, Rutland to the northeast, Paxton to the southeast, Spencer to the south, and New Braintree to the southwest. The towns of Oakham, New Braintree, Spencer and North Brookfield share a common town corner; however, due to its location within feet of the banks of Brooks Pond, there is no direct way to get to North Brookfield from Oakham.

Oakham finished its section of the Mass Central Rail Trail a partially completed shared-use rail trail extending across Massachusetts between Northampton and Boston.

== Demographics ==
Historical population
Year	Pop.	±%
1790	772	—
1850	1,137	+47.3%
1860	959	−15.7%
1870	860	−10.3%
1880	869	+1.0%
1890	738	−15.1%
1900	588	−20.3%
1910	552	−6.1%
1920	477	−13.6%
1930	502	+5.2%
1940	423	−15.7%
1950	455	+7.6%
1960	524	+15.2%
1970	730	+39.3%
1980	994	+36.2%
1990	1,503	+51.2%
2000	1,673	+11.3%
2010	1,902	+13.7%
2020	1,851	−2.7%
2023*	1,886	+1.9%
* = population estimate. Source: United States census records and Population Estimates Program data.

As of the census of 2000, there were 1,673 people, 578 households, and 467 families residing in the town. The population density was 79.2 inhabitants per square mile (30.6/km^{2}). There were 591 housing units at an average density of 28.0 per square mile (10.8/km^{2}). The racial makeup of the town was 98.33% White, 0.36% African American, 0.12% Native American, 0.60% Asian, 0.24% from other races, and 0.36% from two or more races. Hispanic or Latino of any race were 1.02% of the population.

There were 578 households, out of which 41.5% had children under the age of 18 living with them, 71.5% were married couples living together, 6.4% had a female householder with no husband present, and 19.2% were non-families. Of all households 14.7% were made up of individuals, and 5.2% had someone living alone who was 65 years of age or older. The average household size was 2.89 and the average family size was 3.24.

In the town, the population was spread out, with 29.6% under the age of 18, 6.0% from 18 to 24, 29.0% from 25 to 44, 27.5% from 45 to 64, and 7.8% who were 65 years of age or older. The median age was 38 years. For every 100 females, there were 100.4 males. For every 100 females age 18 and over, there were 99.8 males.

The median income for a household in the town was $60,729, and the median income for a family was $63,487. Males had a median income of $42,065 versus $30,882 for females. The per capita income for the town was $23,175. About 1.5% of families and 1.9% of the population were below the poverty line, including 1.8% of those under age 18 and 2.2% of those age 65 or over.

== Education ==
Oakham is part of the Quabbin Regional School District along with Barre, Hardwick, Hubbardston, and New Braintree. Elementary School Students attend Oakham Center School, from grades K–6, middle school students attend Quabbin Regional Middle School from grades 7–8, and high school students attend Quabbin Regional High School from grades 9–12.

== Government ==
State government
State Representative(s):	Donnie Berthiaume (R)
State Senator(s):	Anne M. Gobi (D)
Governor's Councilor(s):	Paul DePalo (D)
Federal government
U.S. Representative(s):	James P. McGovern (D-2nd District),
U.S. Senators:	Elizabeth Warren (D), Ed Markey (D)

== Library ==
The Oakham Free Public Library was established in 1892, and in 1907 a library building made of local fieldstone, Fobes Memorial Library, was built with money donated by the Fobes family. In fiscal year 2008, the town of Oakham spent 1.71% ($47,657) of its budget on its public library—approximately $24 per person, per year ($29.39 adjusted for inflation to 2021). In fiscal year 2017, Oakham spent 1.66% ($58,062) of its budget on its public library—approximately $30 per person, per year.
