= Hardwick, Massachusetts =

- Town
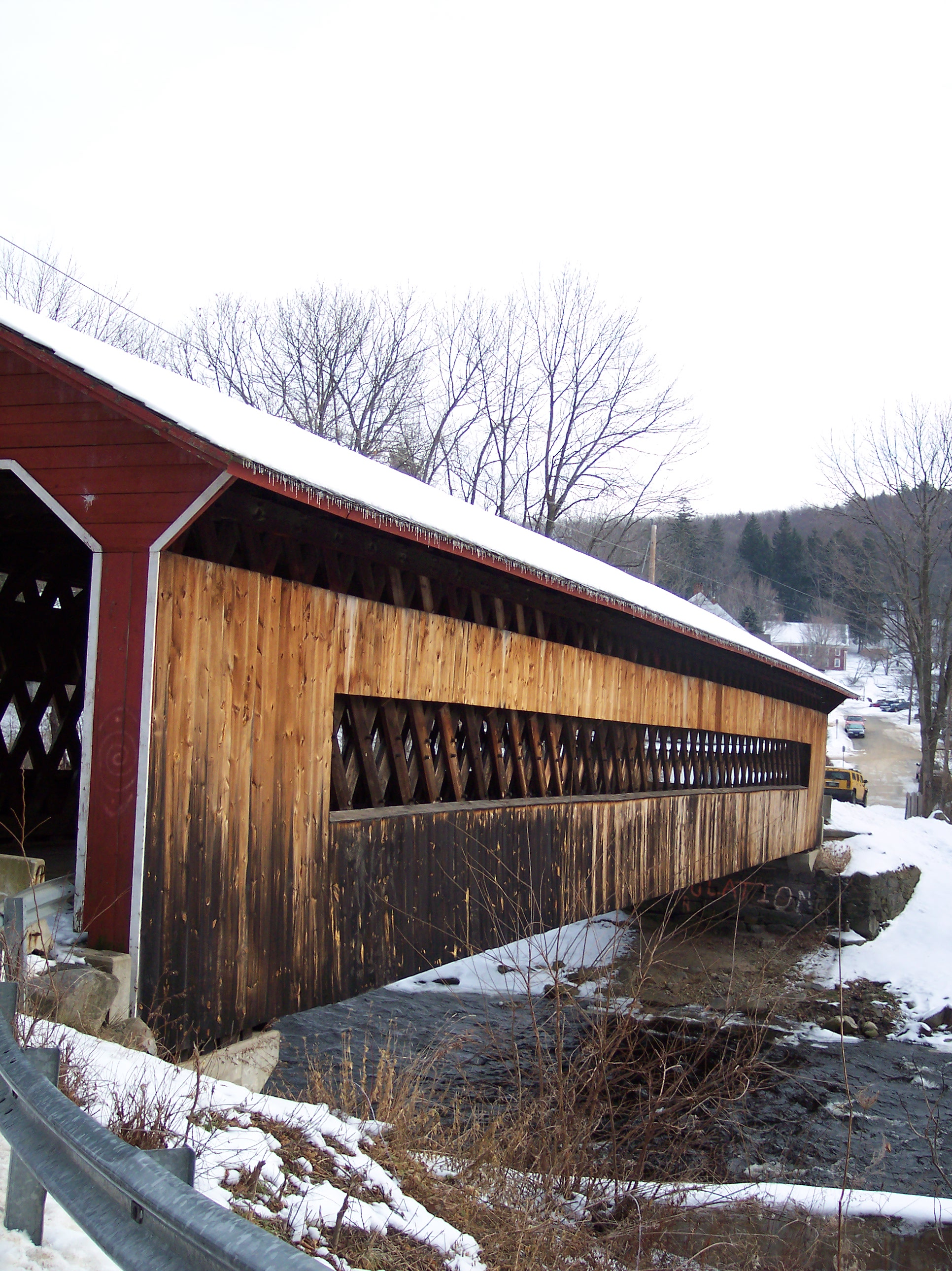
- The Ware-Gilbertville Covered Bridge in Gilbertville

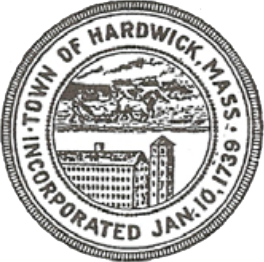
- Seal

- Location in Worcester County and the state of Massachusetts.
- Coordinates: 42°21′00″N 72°12′00″W
- Country: United States
- State: Massachusetts
- County: Worcester
- Settled: 1685 (as Wombemessock and later as Lambstown)
- Incorporated: 1739

Government
  - Type: Open town meeting
  - Board of selectmen: Robert Roy; Deana L. Talbot; Eric Vollheim

Area
  - Total: 40.8 sq mi (105.8 km^{2})
  - Land: 38.6 sq mi (99.9 km^{2})
  - Water: 2.2 sq mi (5.8 km^{2})
- Elevation: 879 ft (268 m)

Population (2020)
  - Total: 2,667
  - Density: 69.1/sq mi (26.7/km^{2})
- Time zone: UTC-5 (Eastern)
  - Summer (DST): UTC-4 (Eastern)
- ZIP Codes: 01037 (Hardwick); 01031 (Gilbertville); 01082 (Ware); 01094 (Wheelwright)
- Area code: 413
- FIPS code: 25-28740
- GNIS feature ID: 0619481
- Website: www.hardwick-ma.gov

Hardwick is a town in Worcester County, Massachusetts, United States, about 20 miles (32 km) northwest of the city of Worcester. It had a population of 2,667 at the 2020 census. It includes the villages of Hardwick, Gilbertville, Wheelwright and Old Furnace.

== History ==
On 27 December 1686, Indigenous Nipmuc tribes transferred land rights to a large area (in the area now known as central Massachusetts) to English settlers from Roxbury; this parcel of land was known to Natives as Wombemessock (meaning "place of chestnuts" or "place of small white fruit") in the Loup language. Many Indigenous peoples were being forced eastward after fighting against settlers in King Phillip's War, and settlers took advantage of the relocations to obtain land rights. The settlers from Roxbury; Joshua Lamb, Nathaniel Paige, Andrew Gardiner, Benjamin Gamblin, Benjamin Tucker, John Curtis, Richard Draper, and Samuel Ruggles; "paid £20" (£4,122.86 or $5,508.94 in 2026) for Wombemessock and would also buy parcels of land in what would become Leicester, Massachusetts and Spencer, Massachusetts.

The original settlers and their heirs made repeated attempts to obtain official permission from the Massachusetts General Court to establish an official settlement in Wombemessock, by the early 1700s known as Lambstown after the largest plantation owner, Colonel Joshua Lamb, son of one of the original settlers, Joshua Lamb. This permission was obtained in 1732, with the General Court recognizing Lambstown. The first church building in the area, The First Church of Christ (a Congregationalist church) in Lambstown was built in 1736 and ministered by The Reverend David White.

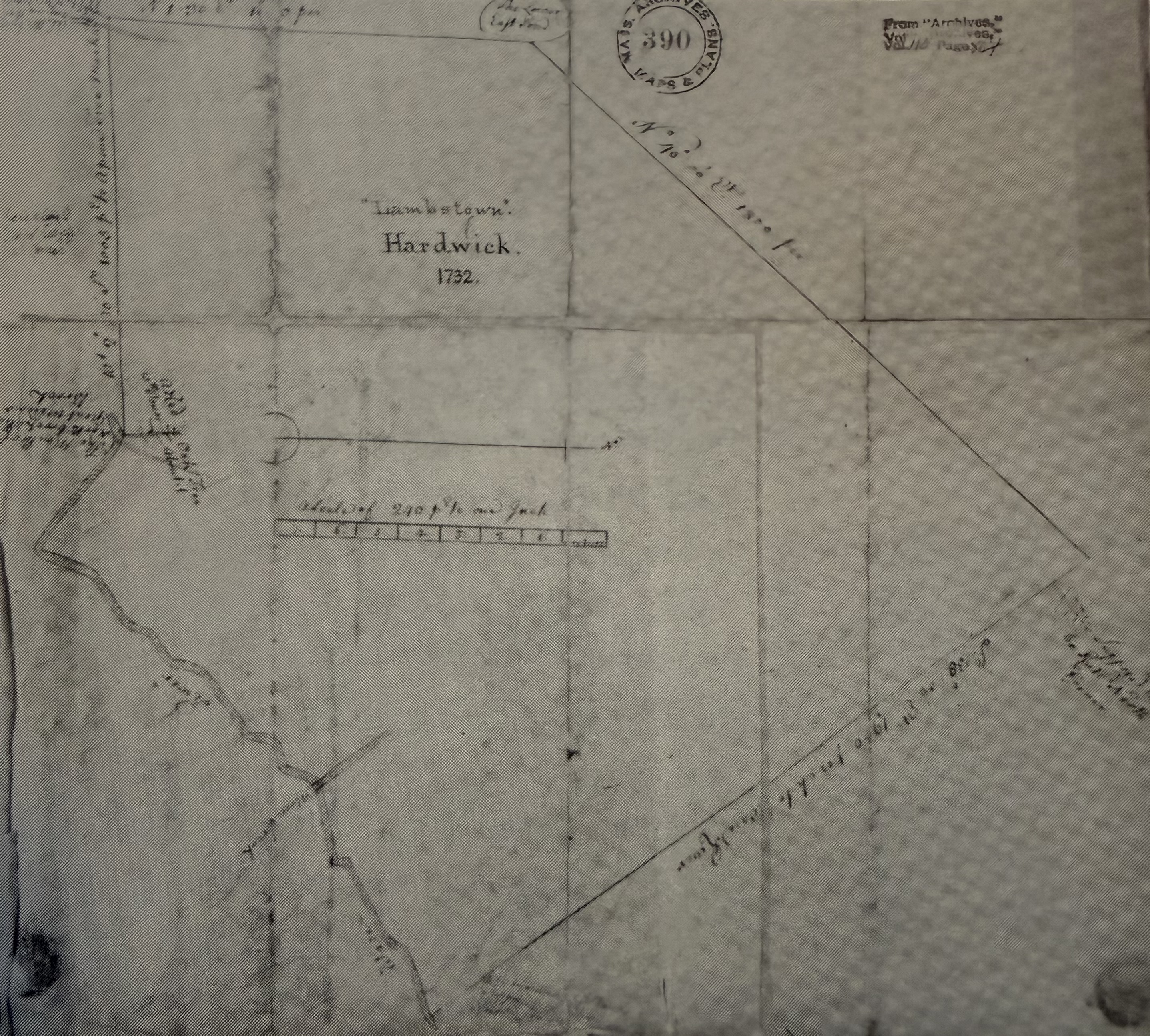
Plan of Lambstown (later Hardwick) in May 1732

Lambstown was officially incorporated in 1739 as "Hardwick," named in honor of Philip Yorke, 1st Earl of Hardwicke, an English nobleman.

In a petition to the General Court in 1754, Timothy Ruggles, the member of the Massachusetts House of Representatives for Hardwick, said of the nascent town:

"[T]he inhabitants[...] went on said lands in poor and low circumstance, and by means of the exceeding roughness of said lands they are to this day obliged to yearly expend large sums[...] there are not above eighty families in said town, many of which are extremely poor."

In 1762, Ruggles, now a brigadier general of the Massachusetts Militia and one of the leading New England Tories (colonists openly loyal to The Crown), introduced the Hardwick Fair, now the oldest annual fair in the United States. During the late 1800s, Hardwick experienced an expansion of its manufacturing industry, textile and paper mills, both of which left the area by the 1930s. The town has retained its agricultural roots, a long-standing tradition in the region. Hardwick is the home of Eagle Hill School, founded in 1967.

== Geography and transportation ==
According to the United States Census Bureau, the town has a total area of 40.8 square miles (106 km^{2}), of which 38.6 square miles (100 km^{2}) is land and 2.2 square miles (5.7 km^{2}), or 5.51%, is water. Hardwick was one of the towns which gained lands (though lost some land area) by the building of the Quabbin Reservoir. The reservoir's waters extend into the town along the former East Branch of the Swift River, which once ran through the northwest corner of town. Due to the disincorporation of the towns which the Quabbin Reservoir and its reservation lands now lie on, Hardwick gained a small portion of the former town of Greenwich along the northwestern corner of town, though it is the smallest portion of land gained by any of the towns surrounding the reservoir. The town lies along the edge of the former Swift River Valley, with Muddy Brook and the former East Branch of the Swift River draining the western part of town, and the Ware River draining the eastern portion. The lands along the Ware, especially in the far eastern part of town, are marshy. The town has some open areas, and a portion of the lands not already protected as part of the Quabbin Reservation are part of the Muddy Brook Wildlife Management Area.

Hardwick lies along the western edge of Worcester County, bordered by Hampshire County to the southwest. It is bordered by Petersham to the northwest, Barre to the northeast, New Braintree to the southeast and Ware to the southwest. From its town center, Hardwick lies 24 miles (39 km) west-northwest of Worcester, 31 miles (50 km) northeast of Springfield, and 64 miles (103 km) west of Boston.

Hardwick has no interstates or limited access highways within town, lying approximately halfway between Interstate 90, also known as the Massachusetts Turnpike, to the south and Route 2 to the north. The southern neighborhood of Gilbertville is the location of the intersection of Route 32 and the southern terminus of Route 32A, with Route 32 coming from Ware heading northeast towards Barre, and Route 32A heading due north through the town's center towards the center of Petersham, where its northern end lies. The Massachusetts Central Railroad line passes through the town from Palmer towards Barre, roughly following the path of Route 32. It does not carry passenger rail, however, not having done so since the early twentieth century. The nearest private airport was the former Tanner-Hiller Airport in New Braintree, and the nearest national air service can be reached at Bradley International Airport in Connecticut.

Hardwick has two open sections of the Mass Central Rail Trail, a partially completed shared-use rail trail extending across Massachusetts between Northampton and Boston.

== Demographics ==
Historical population
Year	Pop.	±%
1790	1,725	—
1850	1,631	−5.4%
1860	1,521	−6.7%
1870	2,219	+45.9%
1880	2,233	+0.6%
1890	2,922	+30.9%
1900	3,203	+9.6%
1910	3,524	+10.0%
1920	3,085	−12.5%
1930	2,460	−20.3%
1940	2,154	−12.4%
1950	2,348	+9.0%
1960	2,340	−0.3%
1970	2,379	+1.7%
1980	2,272	−4.5%
1990	2,385	+5.0%
2000	2,622	+9.9%
2010	2,990	+14.0%
2020	2,667	−10.8%
2022*	2,658	−0.3%
* = population estimate. Source: United States census records and Population Estimates Program data.

As of the census of 2000, there were 2,622 people, 997 households, and 689 families residing in the town. The population density was 67.9 inhabitants per square mile (26.2/km^{2}). There were 1,086 housing units at an average density of 28.1 per square mile (10.8/km^{2}). The racial makeup of the town was 97.79% White, 0.53% African American, 0.15% Native American, 0.11% Asian, 0.19% from other races, and 1.22% from two or more races. Hispanic or Latino of any race were 0.88% of the population.

There were 997 households, out of which 34.9% had children under the age of 18 living with them, 56.4% were married couples living together, 8.3% had a female householder with no husband present, and 30.8% were non-families. 25.8% of all households were made up of individuals, and 13.2% had someone living alone who was 65 years of age or older. The average household size was 2.57 and the average family size was 3.08.

In the town, the population was spread out, with 28.0% under the age of 18, 6.9% from 18 to 24, 28.6% from 25 to 44, 22.7% from 45 to 64, and 13.7% who were 65 years of age or older. The median age was 38 years. For every 100 females there were 94.9 males. For every 100 females age 18 and over, there were 95.0 males.

The median income for a household in the town was $45,742, and the median income for a family was $54,667. Males had a median income of $37,763 versus $30,057 for females. The per capita income for the town was $20,824. About 5.5% of families and 7.5% of the population were below the poverty line, including 5.7% of those under age 18 and 10.9% of those age 65 or over.

== Government ==
State government
State Representative(s):	Donnie Berthiaume (R)
State Senator(s):	Peter Durant (R)
Governor's Councilor(s):	Jen Caissie (R)
Federal government
U.S. Representative(s):	James P. McGovern (D-2nd District),
U.S. Senators:	Elizabeth Warren (D), Ed Markey (D)

== Education ==
Hardwick is part of the Quabbin Regional School District, along with Barre, Hubbardston, New Braintree, and Oakham. Elementary School Students attend Hardwick Elementary School from grades K–6, middle school students attend Quabbin Regional Middle School from grades 7–8, and high school students attend Quabbin Regional High School from grades 9–12. Hardwick is also part of the Pathfinder Regional Vocational-Technical High School District, comprising Belchertown, Granby, Hardwick, Oakham, Monson, New Braintree, Palmer, Ware, and Warren.

== Library ==
The public library in Hardwick was established in 1892. In fiscal year 2008, the town of Hardwick spent 1.58% ($64,023) of its budget on its public library—approximately $24 per person. In fiscal year 2017, the town budget provided the library with 1.16 percent of the total budget, or $26.18 per year for each resident.

A library in the Village of Gilbertville was constructed in 1911 to replace a library housed over one of the nearby Gilbert Company mills. The Gilbertville Library was dedicated on March 29, 1913, by Association President, Charles A. Ware, who acknowledged the library being given by E.H. Gilbert.

The building today retains most of its original design. The only significant change occurred when a barrier-free entrance was added. This new entryway, completed in 2002, was designed to complement the charm and beauty of the original plan. The library is funded through donations, fundraising by the Association and town funds.

== Notable people ==
- Adeliza Perry, Civil War nurse, writer, educator, born in Hardwick
- Jonathan Robinson, United States Senator from Vermont
- Moses Robinson, Governor of Vermont
- Carrie Stevens, model
- Squire Whipple, engineer
- Charles Robinson, Governor of Kansas
