= List of bridges on the National Register of Historic Places in Massachusetts =

This is a list of bridges and tunnels on the National Register of Historic Places in the U.S. state of Massachusetts.

| Name | Image | Built | Listed | Location | County | Type |
|---|---|---|---|---|---|---|
| Annisquam Bridge | Annisquam Bridge | 1861, 1896, 1961 | 1983-06-23 | Gloucester; 42°39′18″N 70°40′32.4″W | Essex | Wood pile type |
| Atherton Bridge | | 1870 | 1979-09-19 | Lancaster; 42°26′40″N 71°40′21″W | Worcester | single span Pony/Post Truss |
| Bardwell's Ferry Bridge | | 1882 | 2000-02-10 | Conway; 42°33′20″N 72°40′41″W | Franklin | |
| Bartlett's Bridge | Bartlett's Bridge in 1990 | 1889 | 2000-02-10 | Oxford; 42°9′17″N 71°52′59″W | Worcester | |
| Bissell Bridge | Bissell Bridge | 1951 | 2004-02-26 | Charlemont; 42°37′57″N 72°52′10″W | Franklin | Long Through Truss |
| Blackstone Viaduct | Blackstone Viaduct | 1872, 1918 | 2002-02-05 | Blackstone; 42°0′55″N 71°32′0″W | Worcester | |
| Burkeville Covered Bridge | | 1870, 1871 | 1988-09-09 | Conway; 42°29′1″N 72°42′44″W | Franklin | Multiple kingrod truss |
| Canton Viaduct | | 1834 | 1984-09-20 | Canton; 42°9′28″N 71°9′17″W | Norfolk | |
| Carpenter Bridge | Carpenter Bridge | 1873 | 1983-06-06 | Rehoboth; 41°49′41″N 71°15′20″W | Bristol | |
| Choate Bridge | | 1764 | 1972-08-21 | Ipswich; 42°40′46″N 70°50′16″W | Essex | Double stone arch (oldest bridge in the country of its type) |
| Coleman Bridge | Coleman Bridge | by 1894 | 2000-02-18 | Windsor; 42°31′56″N 72°59′36″W | Berkshire | Ball-patent Pipe Bridge |
| Crossman Bridge | Crossman Bridge | 1888 | 2010-12-27 | Warren; 42°12′37″N 72°14′44″W | Worcester | One of the state's few surviving lenticular pony truss bridge |
| Deerfield River Bridge | | 1890 | 1988-01-28 | Shelburne, Buckland; 42.6037°N 72.7407°W | Franklin | A contributing element of the Shelburne Falls Historic District. |
| Double-arch Sandstone Bridge | | 1835 | 1984-06-20 | Methuen; 42°44′33″N 71°12′29″W | Essex | Mortarless twin arch |
| Echo Bridge | | 1876, 1877 | 1980-04-09 | Needham, Newton; 42°18′53″N 71°13′39″W | Middlesex, Norfolk | |
| Eliot Memorial Bridge | | 1905 | 1980-09-25 | Milton; 42°12′42″N 71°6′49″W | Norfolk | |
| Bridge of Flowers | | 1905 | 1988-01-28 | Shelburne, Buckland; 42°36′14.67″N 72°44′25.82″W | Franklin | A contributing element of the Shelburne Falls Historic District. |
| Golden Hill Bridge | | ca. 1885 | 1994-02-09 | Lee; 42°19′18″N 73°14′33″W | Berkshire | |
| Granite Keystone Bridge | Granite Keystone Bridge | 1872 | 1981-08-27 | Rockport; 42°40′1″N 70°37′33″W | Essex | Stone-arch bridge |
| Harris Street Bridge | | 1887 | 1984-07-05 | Taunton; 41°54′20″N 71°4′12″W | Bristol | Pratt Truss |
| Linden Street Bridge | | 1894 | 1989-09-28 | Waltham; 42°22′48″N 71°13′15″W | Middlesex | |
| Medford Pipe Bridge | | 1897, 1898 | 1990-01-18 | Medford; 42°25′6″N 71°6′44″W | Middlesex | |
| Middlefield-Becket Stone Arch Railroad Bridge District | | 1840, ca. 1866, 1912 | 1980-04-11 | Becket, Chester, Middlefield; 42°18′44″N 73°1′10″W | Berkshire, Hampden, Hampshire | |
| Needham Street Bridge | | 1875 | 1986-09-04 | Needham, Newton; 42°18′23″N 71°13′3″W | Middlesex, Norfolk | Stone-arch bridge |
| Newton Street Bridge | Newton Street Bridge | 1877 | 1989-09-28 | Waltham; 42°22′20″N 71°13′45″W | Middlesex | Triple-arch stone bridge |
| Old Covered Bridge | Old Covered Bridge | 1837, 1838 | 1978-11-24 | Sheffield; 42°7′26″N 73°21′17″W | Berkshire | Town Lattice Truss Bridge |
| Old Town Bridge | Old Town Bridge | 1848; reconstructed 1900 | 1975-05-02 | Wayland; 42°22′31″N 71°22′49″W | Middlesex | Stone arch bridge |
| Paul's Bridge | Paul's Bridge | 1849, ca. 1935 | 1972-12-11 | Boston, Milton; 42°14′4″N 71°7′24″W | Norfolk, Suffolk | |
| Ponakin Bridge | Ponakin Bridge | 1871 | 1979-09-10 | Lancaster; 42°28′52″N 71°41′9″W | Worcester | Post Through Truss |
| Quinepoxet River Bridge | Quinepoxet River Bridge | 1903 | 1990-04-08 | West Boylston; 42°23′6″N 71°47′52″W | Worcester | |
| Arthur A. Smith Covered Bridge | Arthur A. Smith Covered Bridge | 1868, 1870, 1896 | 1983-02-03 | Colrain; 42°40′12″N 72°43′9″W | Franklin | Burr arch truss system |
| Stone's Bridge | Stone's Bridge | 1858 | 2017-01-17 | Wayland and Framingham; 42°20′21″N 71°23′42″W | Middlesex | Stone arch bridge |
| Waban Arches Bridge | The "Waban Arches" bridge | 1875 | 1991-01-18 | Wellesley; 42.2829°N 71.2974°W | Norfolk | Part of the Sudbury Aqueduct Linear District; this bridge carries the aqueduct over Waban Brook. |
| Wachusett Aqueduct | The Deerfoot Road bridge in Southborough | 1896 | 1991-01-18 | Southborough; 42.305°N 71.5421°W | Worcester | The Wachusett Aqueduct is carried over at least one bridge, and a number of bridges carrying roads (or former roads) over the aqueduct's open channel are contributing structures to its listing on the National Register. The pictured bridge carries Deerfoot Road over the open channel. |
| Walden Street Cattle Pass | Walden Street Cattle Pass | 1857, 1869 | 1994-06-03 | Cambridge; 42°23′21″N 71°7′31″W | Middlesex | |
| Ware-Hardwick Covered Bridge | Ware-Hardwick Covered Bridge | 1886 | 1986-05-08 | Hardwick, Ware; 42°18′37″N 72°12′45″W | Hampshire, Worcester | Town lattice truss |
