= Lancaster Railroad =

Map of the Lancaster Railroad

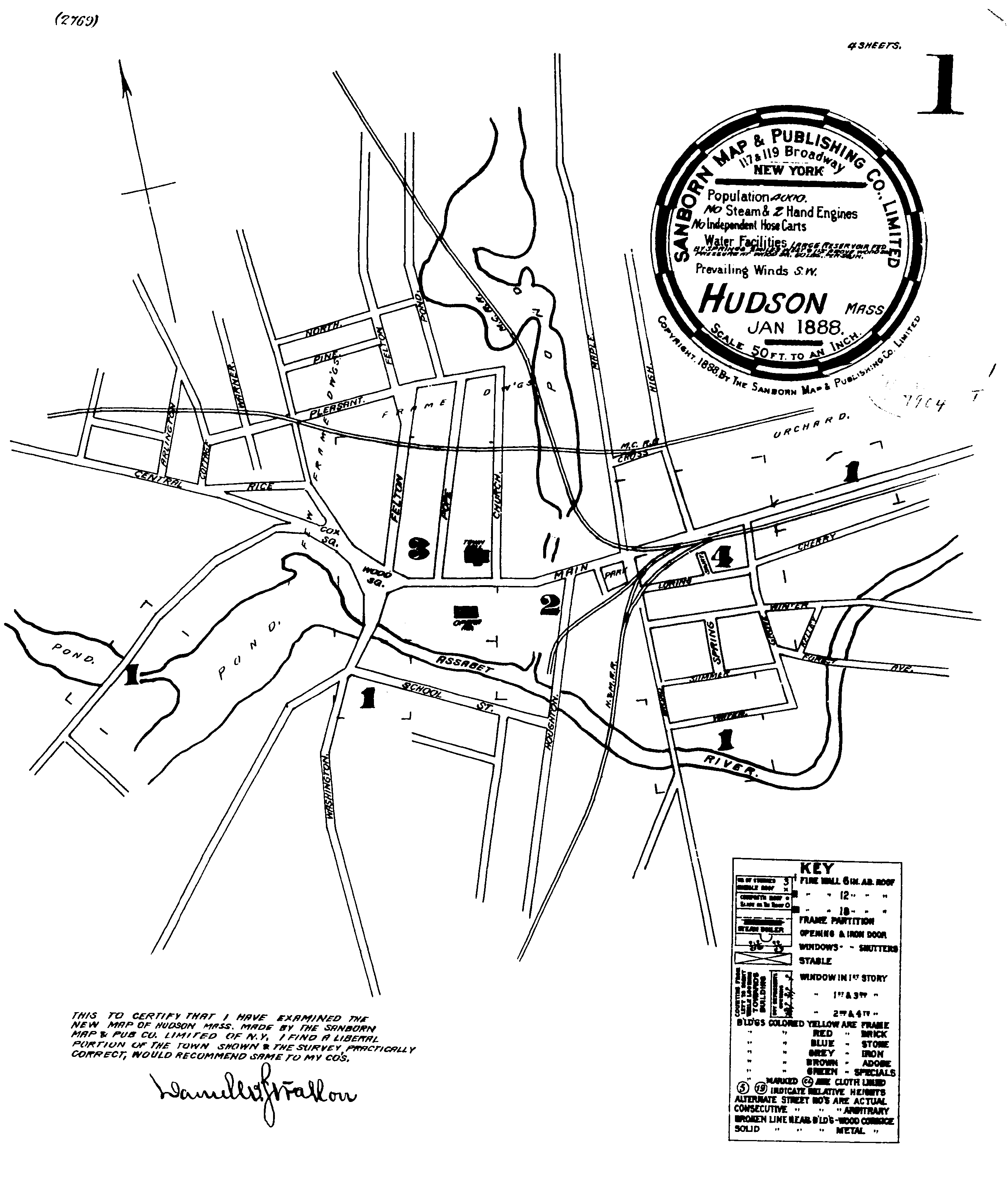
A map of downtown Hudson from 1888 showing the Lancaster Railroad, erroneously labeled as the Central Massachusetts Railroad, crossing over Mill Pond and continuing north off the map.

The Lancaster Railroad, also known as the Lancaster and Hudson Railroad, was a shortline railroad in Massachusetts. The line ran 8.75 miles from a connection with the Worcester and Nashua Railroad in South Lancaster to a connection with the Marlborough Branch of the Fitchburg Railroad in Hudson via the town of Bolton.

== History ==
The Lancaster Railroad was chartered by the Legislature of Massachusetts on April 30, 1870. Its first, and only, president was George A. Parker of Lancaster. In addition to regular stops at the stations at its termini and in Bolton center, the prospectus outlined plans for special stops at Holman's Orchard in the spring and fall as well as at the Hillside Church on Sundays during the summer. No plans for freight service were mentioned. Upon its completion, the Lancaster Railroad was supposed to be leased jointly by its connecting railroads, the Worcester and Nashua Railroad and the Fitchburg Railroad.

Construction began in the winter of 1871 but was plagued with problems, including undercapitalization, frequent disagreements among the seven directors, and, at one point, an inability to meet payroll that resulted in the layoff of the railroad's workmen. In spite of these issues, the line was completed by the spring of 1872. Ultimately, however, the railroad's problems proved too great to overcome, and it would never officially open. The only train to pass over the route carried the railroad's officials as they inspected the completed work. The main reason cited for the railroad's failure was a lack of funds; however, other underlying issues also contributed. Chief among these underlying issues was that neither the Worcester and Nashua Railroad nor the Fitchburg Railroad ever exercised their lease agreements of the Lancaster Railroad in part due to disagreements over the details of the joint lease. Adding to the list of the Lancaster Railroad's problems was a lawsuit on June 22, 1872 alleging that the railroad had damaged a dam of the Holmes Manufacturing Estate in Hudson.

In 1874, the Lancaster Railroad entered into bankruptcy. Although it emerged from bankruptcy in 1877, it was never resurrected, partially due to the threat of increased competition from the advancing Central Massachusetts Railroad. The property was sold to Robert Codman, a director of the Fitchburg Railroad, for $15,000- a fraction of the $290,000 it had originally cost- and then turned over to the Fitchburg Railroad itself a short time later. With no need for the line, the rails were taken up in 1889.

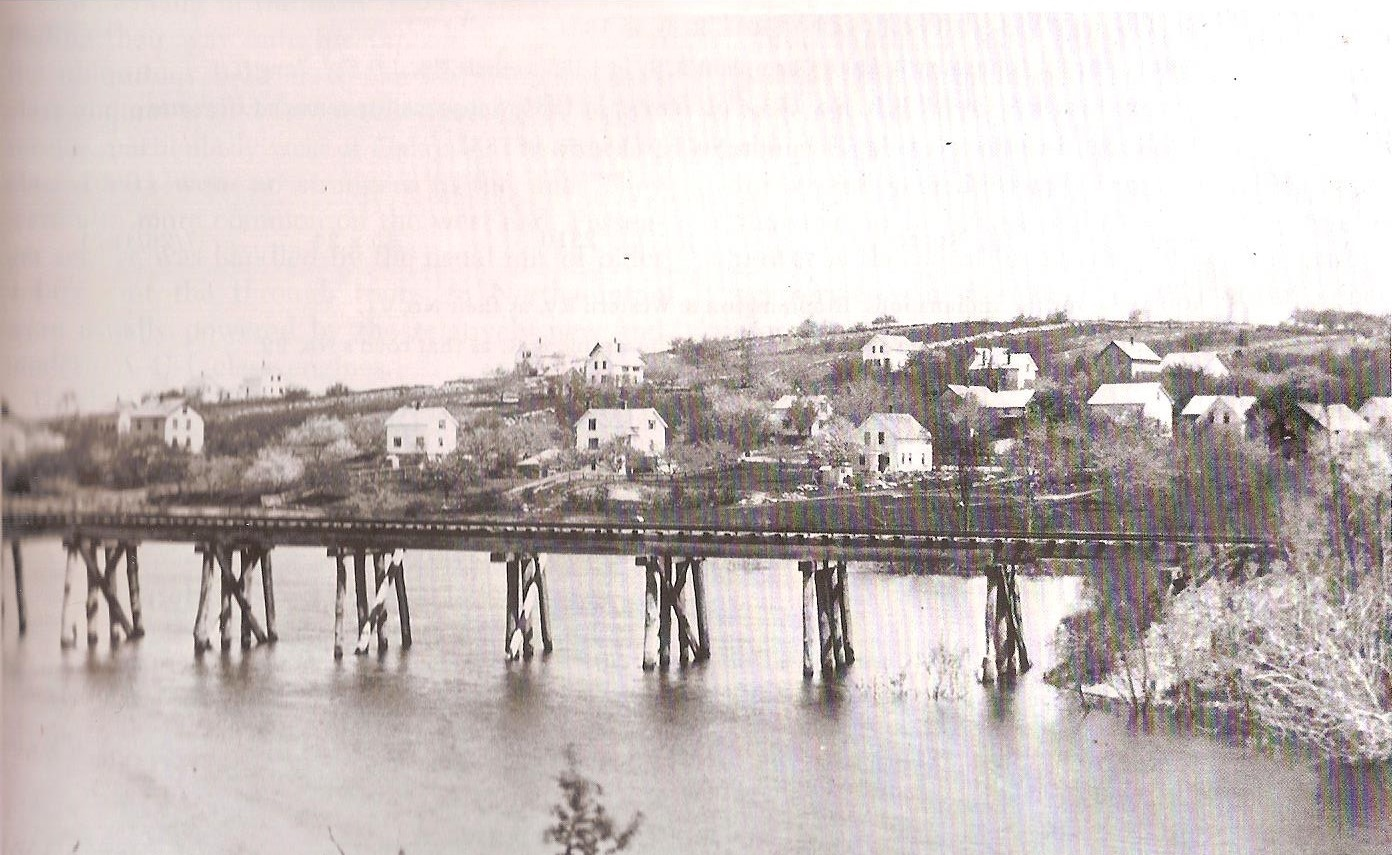
The Lancaster Railroad trestle passing over Mill Pond in Hudson, Massachusetts, probably taken sometime in the 1870s.

In late 1895, the Lancaster Railroad was briefly considered for resurrection. The Boston and Maine Railroad had leased the Worcester and Nashua Railroad in 1886, renaming it the Worcester, Nashua, and Portland Division Main Line, and the Central Massachusetts Railroad in 1897, renaming it the Central Massachusetts Branch. By 1895, planning was underway for the construction of the Wachusett Reservoir, and the Boston and Maine needed to reroute a portion of its Central Massachusetts Branch in Boylston and West Boylston that would be flooded. Their plan was to build a new stretch of track from West Berlin Junction with the New York, New Haven and Hartford Railroad to the Worcester, Nashua, and Portland Division Main Line at Clinton Junction. Trains on the Central Massachusetts Branch would then follow the Worcester, Nashua, and Portland Division Main Line into Oakdale, where they would switch back onto the Central Massachusetts Branch. Sensing an opportunity to bring the rail service to their town that had never materialized in the preceding decades, the citizens of Bolton proposed that the Boston and Maine use the Lancaster Railroad right of way instead, building a small connection in Hudson and leaving Berlin at the end of a four-mile branch. Ultimately, however, the Boston and Maine elected to go with its original plan, and the Lancaster Railroad was never rebuilt.

== Present Day ==
Today, with all of the rails torn up, there is very little evidence of the Lancaster Railroad. Part of the railroad's route included a wooden trestle that ran across Mill Pond, also known as Bruce's Pond, in Hudson. Although the wooden part of the trestle was destroyed during the 1938 New England hurricane, the support bases can still be seen when water levels are low. Much of the grading can still be seen along the route, especially in the Boy Scouts of America's Camp Resolute in Bolton, although the Boston and Maine sold off other parts of the property for redevelopment. Bridge abutments can also be seen where the railroad crossed Route 85 and Interstate 495.
