= Lowell Corporation =

- Industry: Manufacturing
- Founded: 1869
- Headquarters: 65 Hartwell Street, West Boylston, Massachusetts
- Products: Ratchets and other hand tools for High Line and Pipeline Utility installation and repair, ratchets as handles and clutches for original equipment manufacture; Portable Hydraulic Units with attachments for Automotive body and frame repair, Clamps and accessories for auto body and frame repair
- Website: www.lowellcorp.com

Lowell Corporation is a manufacturing company based in West Boylston, Massachusetts. The company was originally based in Worcester, Massachusetts and called the Lowell Wrench Company.

Lowell Corporation produces ratchet wrenches and other hand tools used for High Line and Pipeline Utility installation and repair. Lowell also makes ratchets as handles and clutches for inclusion in original industrial and commercial equipment. Through its Porter-Ferguson division, Lowell Corp. also produces portable hydraulic units and repair clamps for the automotive body and frame repair industry.
