= Mount Vernon Cemetery =

Mount Vernon Cemetery may refer to various burial locations, including:

- Mount Vernon Cemetery (Philadelphia)
- Mount Vernon Cemetery (West Boylston, Massachusetts)
