= Old Town Bridge (disambiguation) =

Old Town Bridge is located in Trondheim, Norway.

Old Town Bridge may also refer to:

== United States ==
- Old Town Bridge (Wayland, Massachusetts), listed on the National Register of Historic Places in Middlesex County, Massachusetts
- Old Town Bridge (Franklin, Tennessee), listed on the National Register of Historic Places in Williamson County, Tennessee
