= Coleman Bridge (disambiguation) =

Coleman Bridge may refer to:

- George P. Coleman Memorial Bridge at Yorktown, Virginia
- Coleman Bridge, Singapore
- Coleman Bridge (Windsor, Massachusetts)
