= Granite Keystone Bridge =

- U.S. National Register of Historic Places
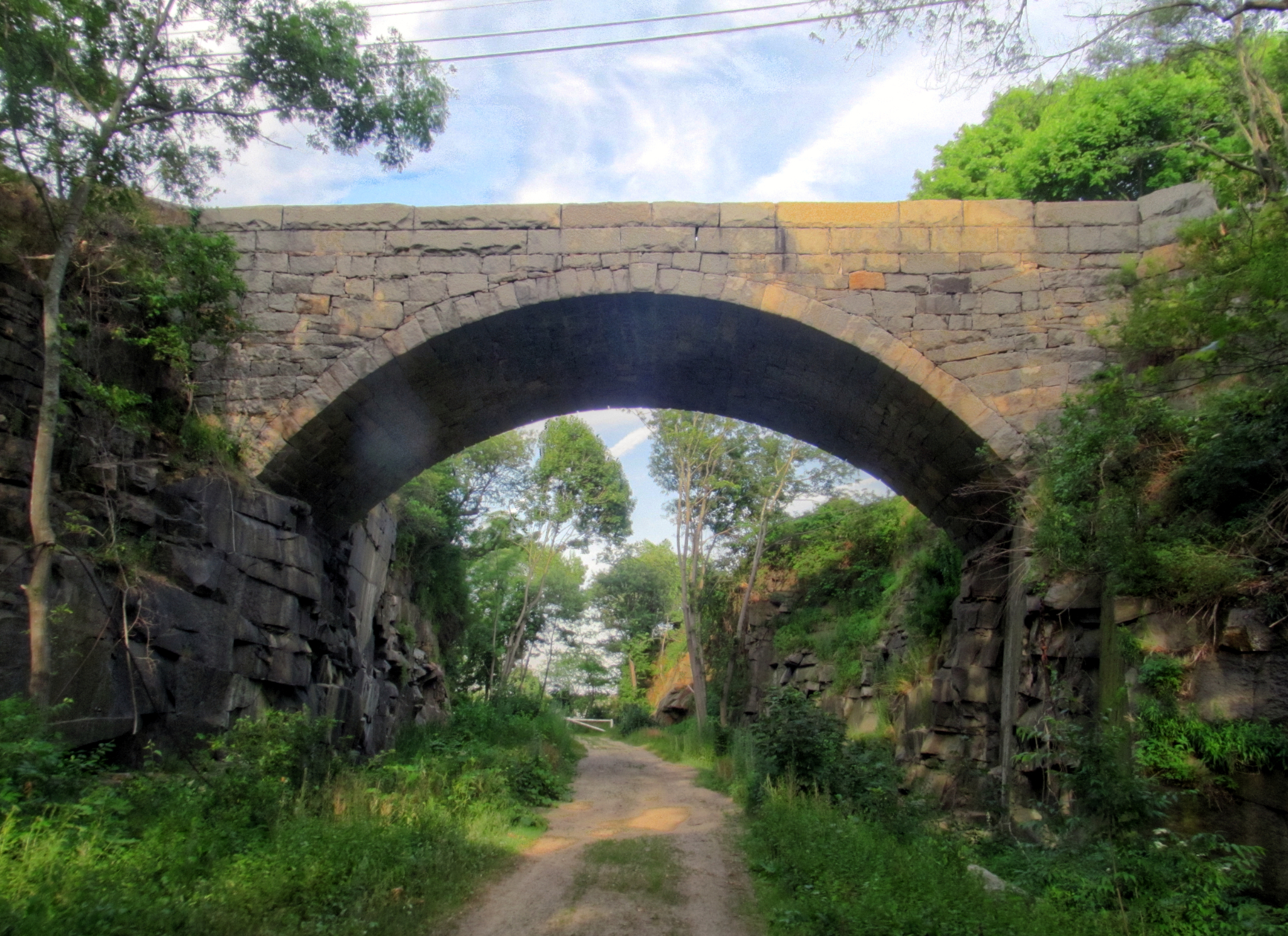
- Granite Keystone Bridge in 2016

- Location within Massachusetts Location within the United States
- Location: Rockport, Massachusetts
- Coordinates: 42°40′1″N 70°37′33″W
- Built: 1872
- Architect: Jonathan Pratt
- NRHP reference No.: 81000117
- Added to NRHP: August 27, 1981

The Granite Keystone Bridge is a historic bridge that carries Granite Street (Massachusetts Route 127) over the former railroad that transported granite from Pigeon Hill to Granite Pier in Rockport, Massachusetts. The bridge arch was built in 1872 in eleven weeks. Its single arch spans 65 feet (20 m) and is 32 feet (9.8 m) wide. The bridge was added to the National Register of Historic Places in 1981.

== History ==
Granite was extracted from Rockport quarries as early as 1830, and was a major industry in the seaside community for most of the 19th century. The Flat Ledge Quarry was one of the largest operations, moving its stones across Granite Street to first Knowlton Pier, and then later the Granite Pier, where ships transported the stone up and down the Atlantic coast. By the 1860s the Rockport Granite Company sought means to more rapidly move the stone from the quarry to the waterfront. To this end, a deep cut was made under Granite Street. The bridge over this cut was designed by John Pratt of Quincy and built in the spring and summer of 1872. Its 65-foot span was described at the time as one of the longest in the state. The bridge is built out of large blocks of dressed stone laid in courses. It is one of a small number of structures in Rockport that are built out of native stone. It is now owned and maintained by the state.

== See also ==
- National Register of Historic Places listings in Essex County, Massachusetts
- List of bridges on the National Register of Historic Places in Massachusetts
