= Golden Hill Bridge =

- U.S. National Register of Historic Places
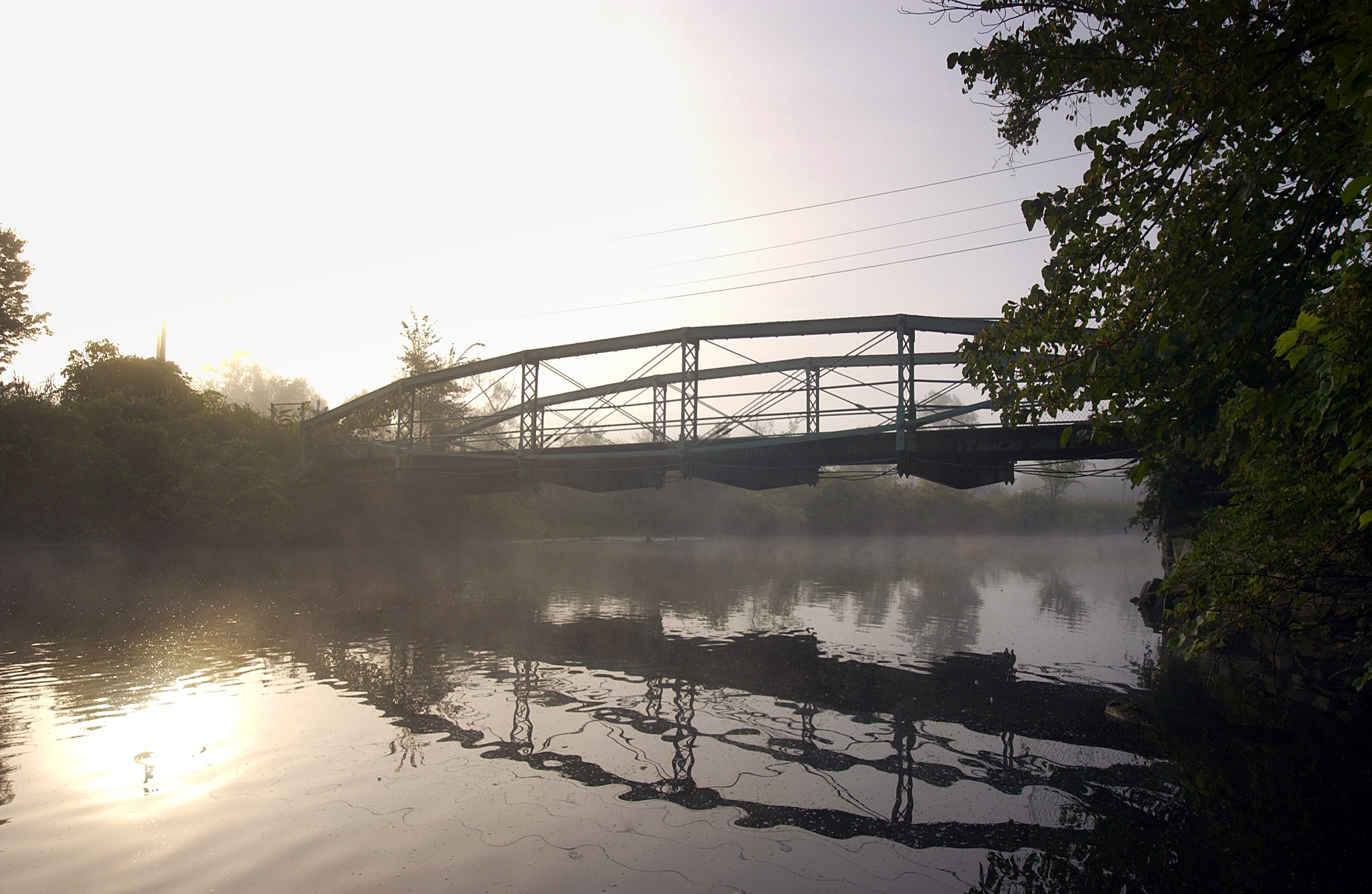

- Location within Massachusetts Location within the United States
- Location: Golden Hill Rd., Lee, Massachusetts
- Coordinates: 42°19′18″N 73°14′33″W
- Architect: Berlin Iron Bridge Co.
- Architectural style: Lenticular pony truss
- NRHP reference No.: 93001592
- Added to NRHP: February 9, 1994

The Golden Hill Bridge is a historic bridge on Golden Hill Road over the Housatonic River in Lee, Massachusetts. It is a lenticular pony truss bridge built c. 1885 by the Berlin Iron Bridge Company, and is the state's oldest surviving bridge of this type. It is one of only five Berlin Co. bridges in the Berkshires, and is the only known surviving bridge to implement modifications to the pony truss design patented by William O. Douglas in 1885. The bridge was listed on the National Register of Historic Places in 1994.

== Description and history ==
The Golden Hill Bridge is located in a rural setting in northern Lee, carrying Golden Hill Road, a local through street, across the Housatonic River in an east–west orientation. It is a single-span iron lenticular pony truss structure, 80 feet 8 inches (24.59 m) long and 16 feet 6 inches (5.03 m) wide, resting on concrete abutments. The truss depth at the center of the span is 7 feet 5 inches (2.26 m). The bridge deck consists of modern steel I-beam stringers supporting a concrete road surface.

A bridge has been documented to stand at this location as early as the 1790s. A bridge at the site underwent repairs in 1866, but was judged to be in need of repair or replacement in 1885. The town contracted for the trusses with the Berlin Iron Bridge Company, then a major producer of bridge trusses, and the bridge was completed for $1,000. In 1965, the state added a metal grid deck, and in 1970 it replaced the original deck supports with I-beams. In 1992, after the bridge was closed to vehicular traffic, the state began proceedings to consider replacement of the aging structure. It was further closed to pedestrians in 1996. The bridge finally underwent major restorative work in 2005, and is again open to traffic.

== See also ==
- National Register of Historic Places listings in Berkshire County, Massachusetts
- List of bridges on the National Register of Historic Places in Massachusetts
