= Ponakin Bridge =

- U.S. National Register of Historic Places
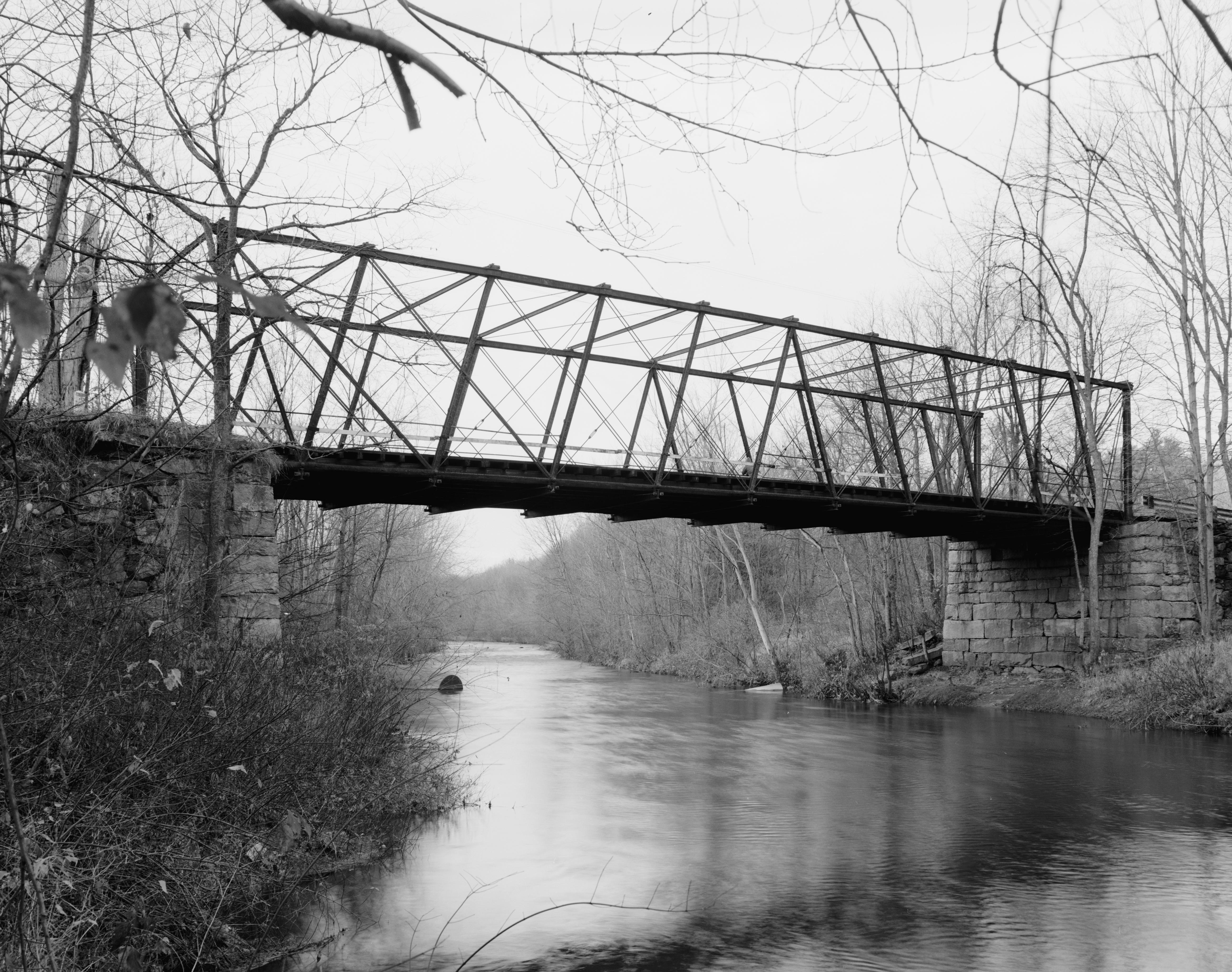
- Ponakin Bridge, 1979

- Location within Massachusetts Location within the United States
- Location: Nashua River between Ponakin Road and MA 70, Lancaster, Massachusetts
- Coordinates: 42°28′52″N 71°41′07″W
- Area: less than one acre
- Built: 1871
- Architect: Watson Manufacturing Co.
- Architectural style: Post truss
- NRHP reference No.: 79000378
- Added to NRHP: September 10, 1979

The Ponakin Bridge is a historic Post truss bridge spanning the Nashua River in northern Lancaster, Massachusetts. The bridge was built in 1871, and originally carried the main north–south road (now Ponakin Road), which was bypassed by the construction of Massachusetts Route 70. It is now unsafe and closed even to pedestrians. The bridge, with a design once common but now extremely rare, was listed on the National Register of Historic Places in 1979.

== Description and history ==
The Ponakin Bridge is located in a rural setting several miles north of the village center of Lancaster, spanning the Nashua River in a roughly east–west orientation between Massachusetts Route 70 and Ponakin Road, a dead-end residential street paralleling the river's west bank. The bridge trusses consist of eight paneled sections with a total span of 100 feet (30 m) and a width of 20 feet (6.1 m). It rests on granite stone abutments formed out of rough-cut stone 20 feet (6.1 m) long. The decking consists of a base of cross timbers which are attached to the trusses, with wood stringers, then transverse cross timbers, and finally three inch deck planking. The truss panels have pinned end diagonals that are under compression, diagonal bars spanning two panels under tension.

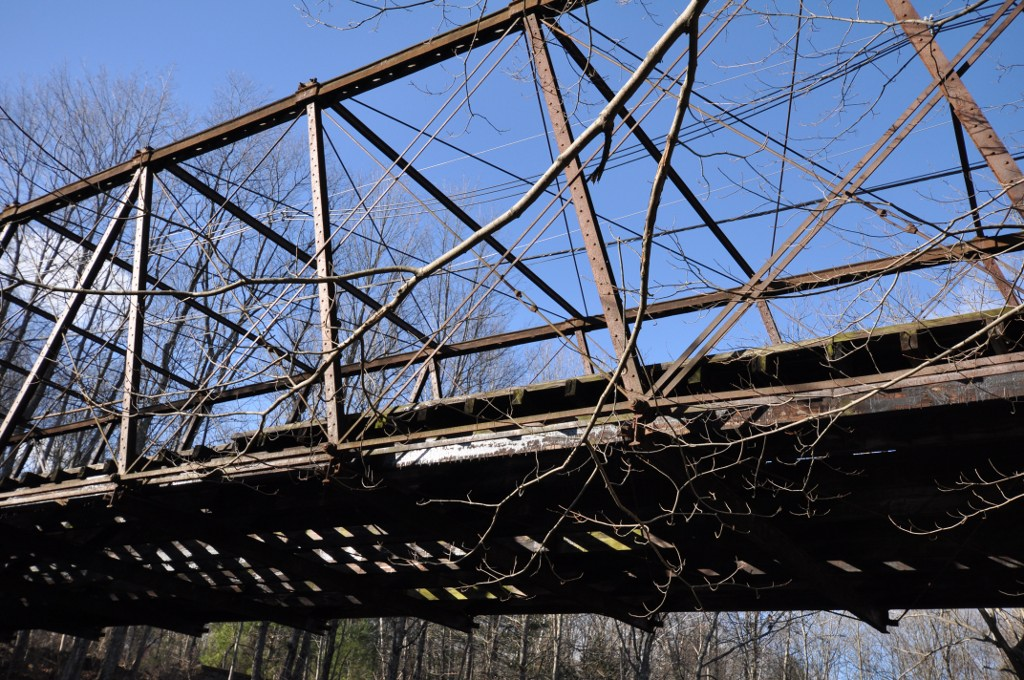
The bridge in 2012

The bridge was built in 1871 for town by the Watson Manufacturing Company of Paterson, New Jersey. It was built at a location where wooden bridges had stood since the 17th century, on the major road leading north from Lancaster. The route was bypassed by the present alignment of Route 70 in 1965. The bridge design was patented about 1866 by Simon S. Post, and was one of the major bridge forms used in developing the national railroad network, including major crossings such as that of the Union Pacific Railroad over the Missouri River. The bridge deck is now compromised, and the bridge has been closed to all forms of traffic.

== See also ==
- Atherton Bridge
- List of bridges documented by the Historic American Engineering Record in Massachusetts
- List of bridges on the National Register of Historic Places in Massachusetts
- National Register of Historic Places listings in Worcester County, Massachusetts
