= Newton Street Bridge =

- U.S. National Register of Historic Places
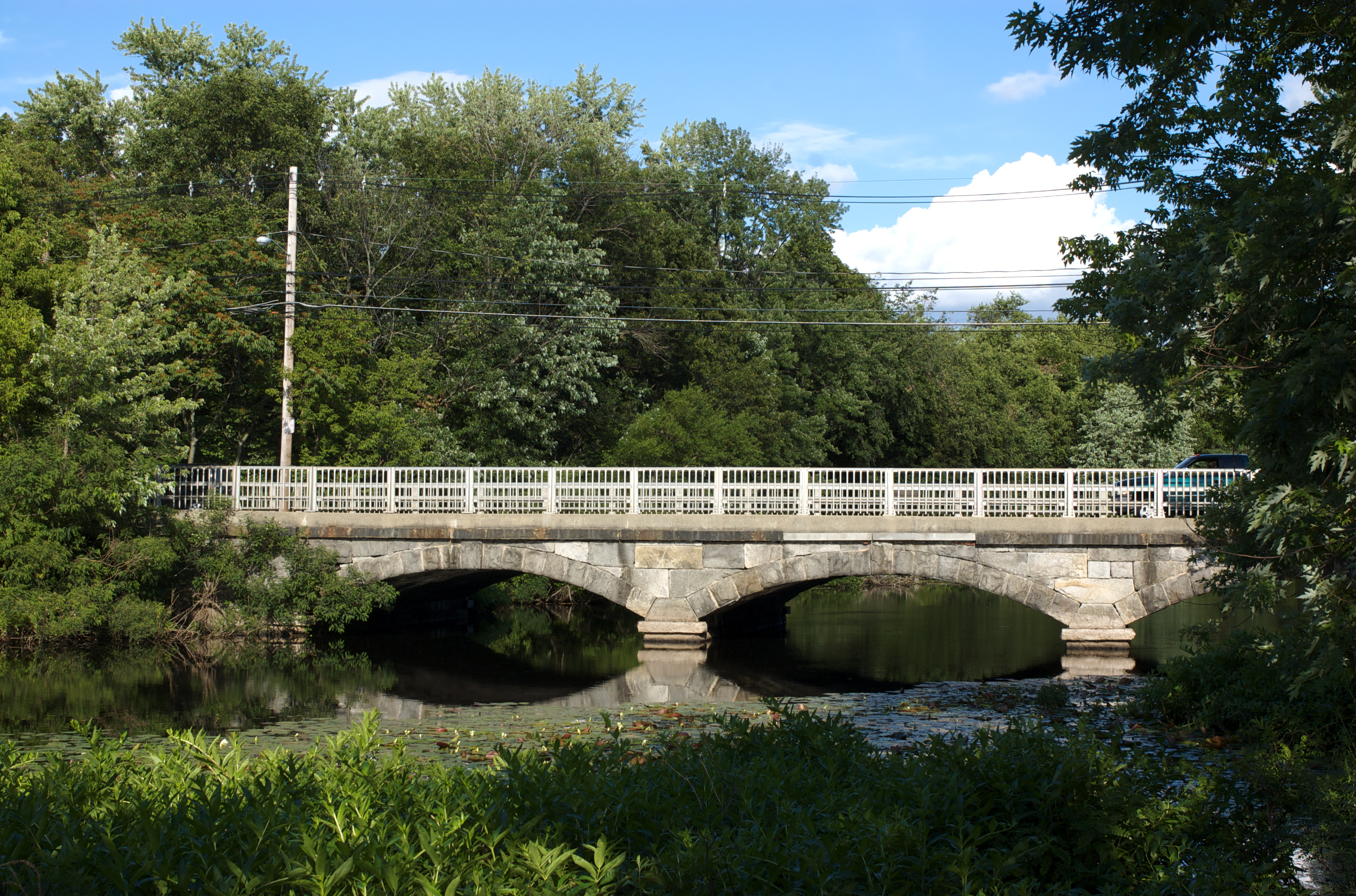

- Location within Massachusetts Location within the United States
- Location: Newton St. at River St. over the Charles River, Waltham, Massachusetts
- Coordinates: 42°22′20″N 71°13′45″W
- Built: 1877
- Architect: Hiram Blaisdell
- MPS: Waltham MRA
- NRHP reference No.: 89001539
- Added to NRHP: September 28, 1989

The Newton Street Bridge is a historic bridge carrying Newton Street over the Charles River in Waltham, Massachusetts. The stone arch bridge was built in 1877 on the site of Waltham's first bridge, which was built c. 1761–62. It was designed by Hiram Blaisdell, a specialist in the design of masonry bridges. It consists of three elliptical arch segments on granite piers. The arches are formed of granite voussoirs, and the facing of the bridge is predominantly rough rock. It is the only 19th-century bridge in Waltham to escape significant alteration.

The bridge was listed on the National Register of Historic Places in 1989.

== See also ==
- List of bridges on the National Register of Historic Places in Massachusetts
- National Register of Historic Places listings in Waltham, Massachusetts
