= Bartlett's Bridge =

- U.S. National Register of Historic Places
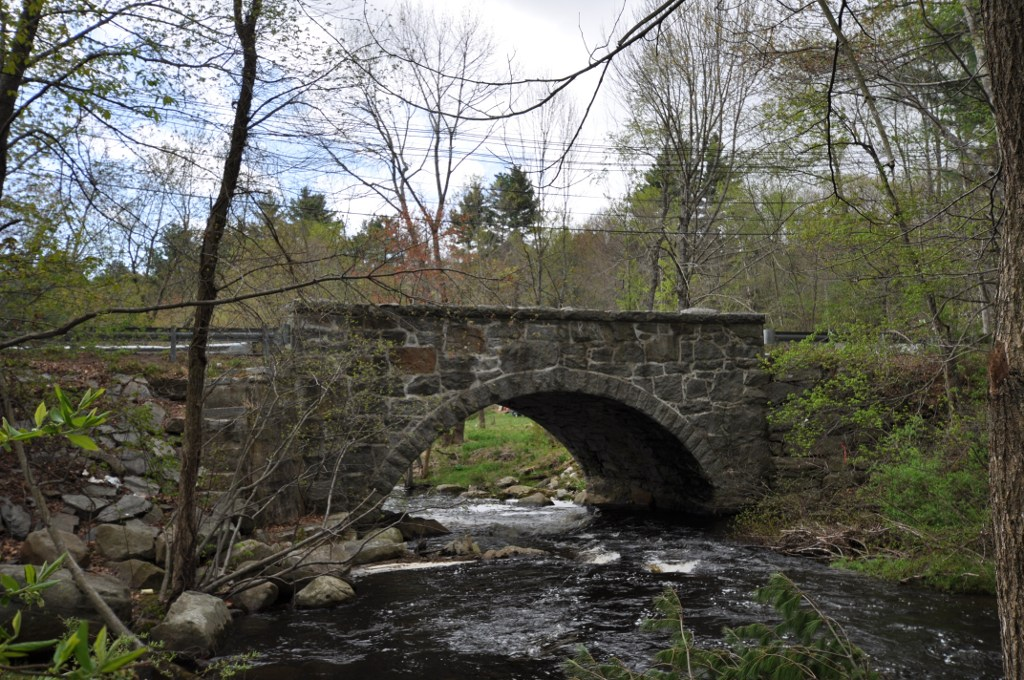
- Bartlett's Bridge in 2012

- Location within Massachusetts Location within the United States
- Location: Oxford, Massachusetts
- Coordinates: 42°9′17.15″N 71°52′57.1″W
- Area: less than one acre
- Built: 1889
- Architect: Charles A. Allen
- Architectural style: Stone arch bridge
- NRHP reference No.: 00000077
- Added to NRHP: February 10, 2000

Bartlett's Bridge is a historic stone arch bridge carrying Clara Barton Road over the French River in Oxford, Massachusetts. Built in 1889, it is a rare example of late 19th-century stone bridge construction in the state. It was originally built to provide improved capacity for vehicles servicing a nearby textile mill complex. The bridge was listed on the National Register of Historic Places in 2000.

== Description and history ==
Bartlett's Bridge is located in northern Oxford, in what is now a largely rural-residential area, carrying Clara Barton Road a short way west of its junction with Main Street. The bridge is 30 feet (9.1 m) long and 42 feet (13 m) wide, with its elliptical arch reaching a height of 13 feet (4.0 m) above the river. The facing of the bridge is rough-cut granite that has been fixed with mortar. In contrast, the granite stones that make up the arch have been very precisely worked. The bridge has parapet walls made of large granite slabs 4.5 feet (1.4 m), 2 feet (0.61 m) wide, and 1 foot (0.30 m) thick.

The bridge was built in 1889 to a design by Charles A. Allen, at the time a civil engineer for the city of Worcester. The bridge was built to replace an older wooden span at the request of Edwin Bartlett, the owner of textile mills in North Oxford, whose businesses and employees would have used the road. Bartlett had originally requested that the town build an iron truss bridge, but it opted instead for one made of stone, which was completed by Worcester-based stonemasons in six months at a cost of $2200. Its construction precedes by a few years the state's first establishment of standards for highway bridge construction.

== See also ==
- List of bridges documented by the Historic American Engineering Record in Massachusetts
- List of bridges on the National Register of Historic Places in Massachusetts
- National Register of Historic Places in Worcester County, Massachusetts
