= Old Stone Church (West Boylston, Massachusetts) =

Historic church in Massachusetts, United States

- U.S. National Register of Historic Places
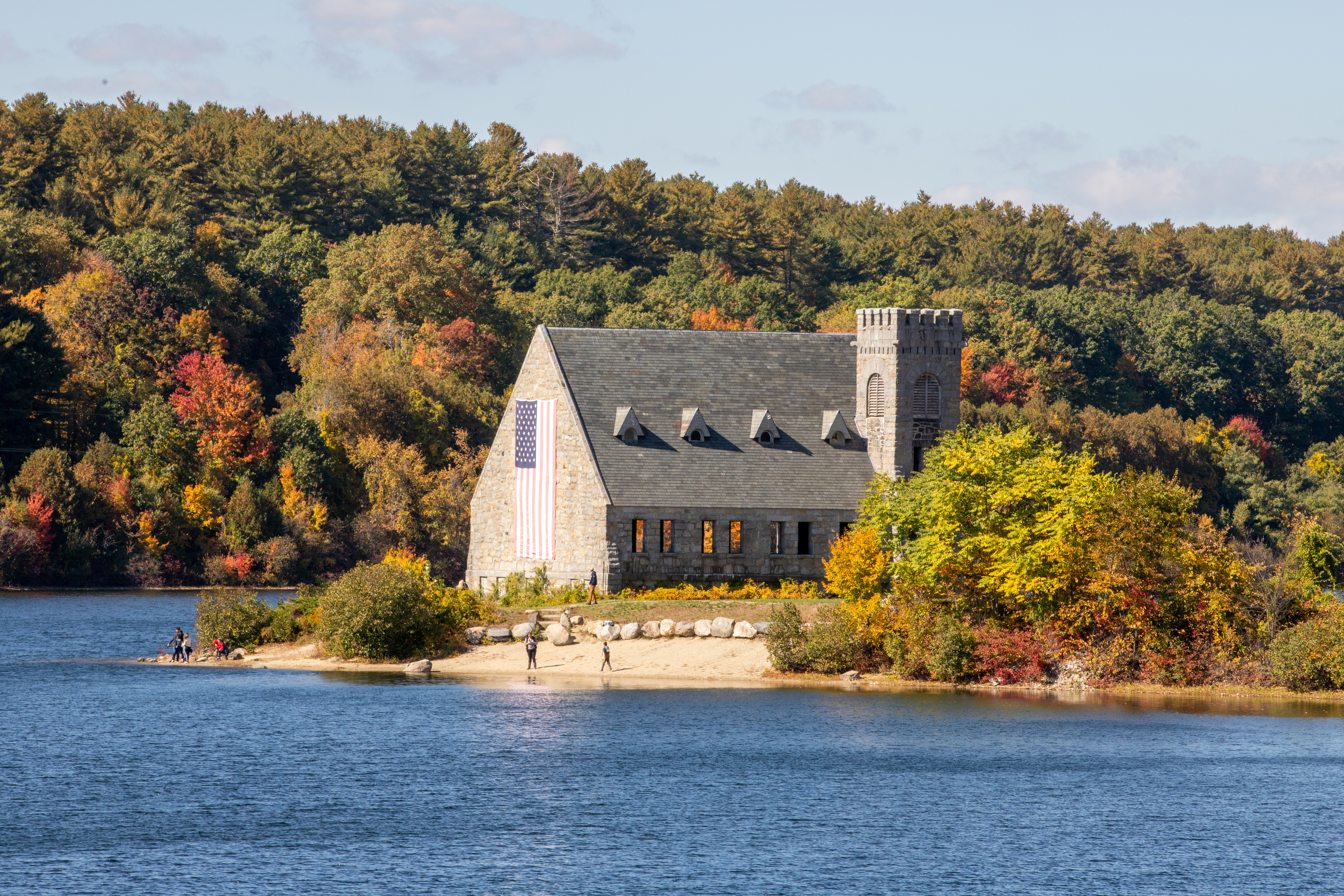
- Old Stone Church

- Location within Massachusetts Location within the United States
- Location: West Boylston, Massachusetts
- Coordinates: 42°22′29″N 71°46′59″W
- Built: 1891
- NRHP reference No.: 73000329
- Added to NRHP: April 13, 1973

The Old Stone Church is a former church building West Boylston, Massachusetts. It was built in 1891 and abandoned in 1902 due to construction of the Wachusett Reservoir. It was added to the National Register of Historic Places in 1973.

== History ==
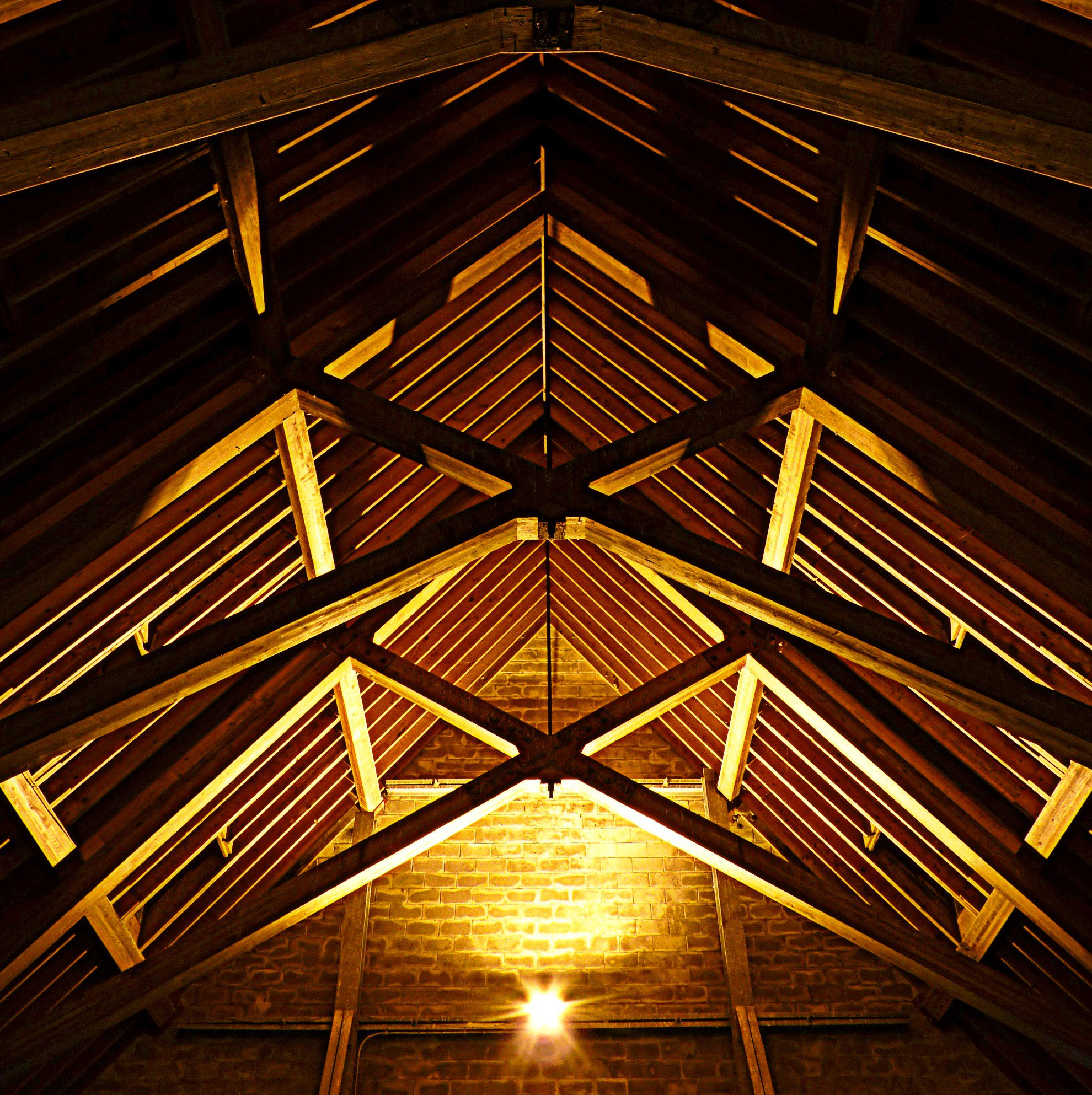
Interior of the church

In the 19th century, the Quinapoxet River joined the Stillwater River to become the southern branch of the Nashua River in the town of West Boylston. The predecessor of the Old Stone Church was the second house of worship for the Baptist Society in West Boylston, dedicated on December 6, 1832. The church was constructed east to the confluence of the rivers.

The church and its neighboring church, Saint Anthony's Roman Catholic Church, were destroyed by a fire on May 2, 1890. The present Old Stone Church was built on the same site and was scheduled for dedication on March 17, 1892, but a fire again badly damaged the interior of the church and the dedication was postponed until May 19, 1892.

From 1896 through 1905 West Boylston endured the building of the Wachusett Reservoir and the destruction of its mills and farms. When the Wachusett Reservoir was completed, the Old Stone Church remained standing as the last remnant of the town which was once in the valley, but was now flooded by the new reservoir. In June 1897, the Metropolitan Water Board awarded the Baptist Society $22,500 for the loss of the church for the construction of the reservoir. The last Baptist service was held in April 1902.

On April 13, 1973, the Old Stone Church was listed on the National Register of Historic Places. On June 27, 1974, the State awarded $87,000 for reinforcing the roof and walls of the church building. The following month, the church roof and three walls collapsed requiring rebuilding which was completed in the Spring of 1977. On September 25, 1983, on the occasion of the year of the 175th Anniversary of the Incorporation of the Town of West Boylston, the Rededication of the Old Stone Church was held.

== See also ==
- National Register of Historic Places listings in Worcester County, Massachusetts
