= Crossman Bridge =

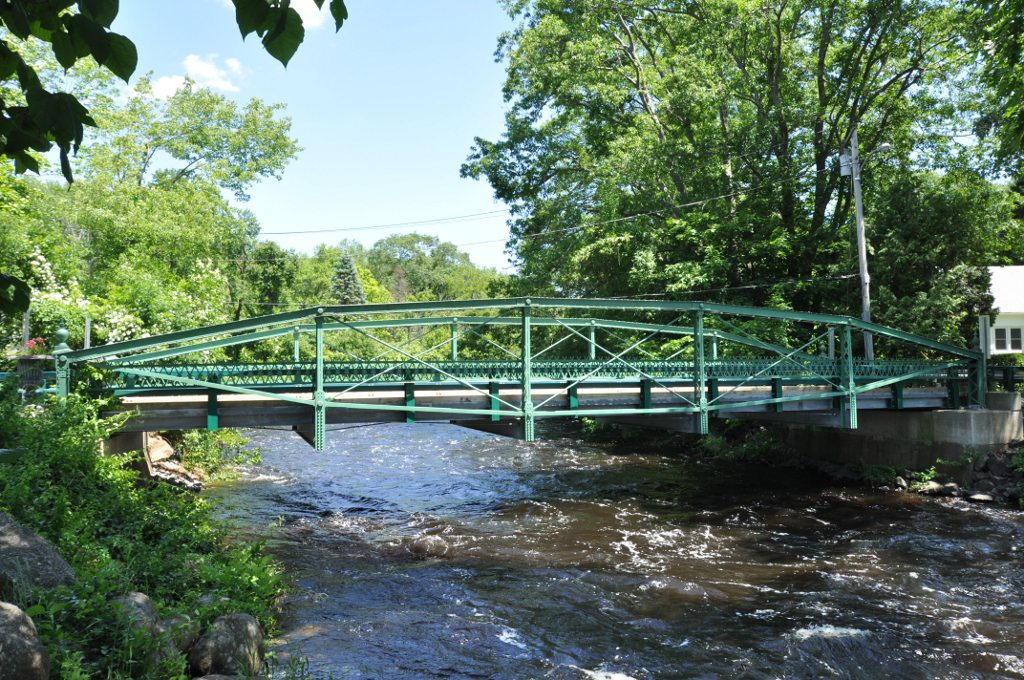
- Crossman Bridge
- Coordinates: 42°12′37″N 72°14′44″W
- Crosses: Quaboag River
- Locale: Warren, Massachusetts

Characteristics
- Design: Lenticular pony truss
- Total length: 73.2 ft (22.3 m)
- Width: 17.7 ft (5.4 m)
- Longest span: 71.9 ft (21.9 m)

History
- Construction end: 1888
- Construction cost: $2,175
- Crossman Bridge
- U.S. National Register of Historic Places
- Location: Gilbert Road, Warren, Massachusetts
- Built: 1888
- NRHP reference No.: 10001065
- Added to NRHP: December 27, 2010

Location
- Interactive map of Crossman Bridge

The Crossman Bridge, also known as the Gilbert Road Bridge, is a truss bridge located in Warren, Massachusetts, carrying Gilbert Road across the Quaboag River. Built in 1888 and rehabilitated in 2004–08, it is one of the few surviving lenticular truss bridges in Massachusetts, and the only known lenticular pony truss bridge. The bridge was added to the National Register of Historic Places in 2010.

== Description and history ==
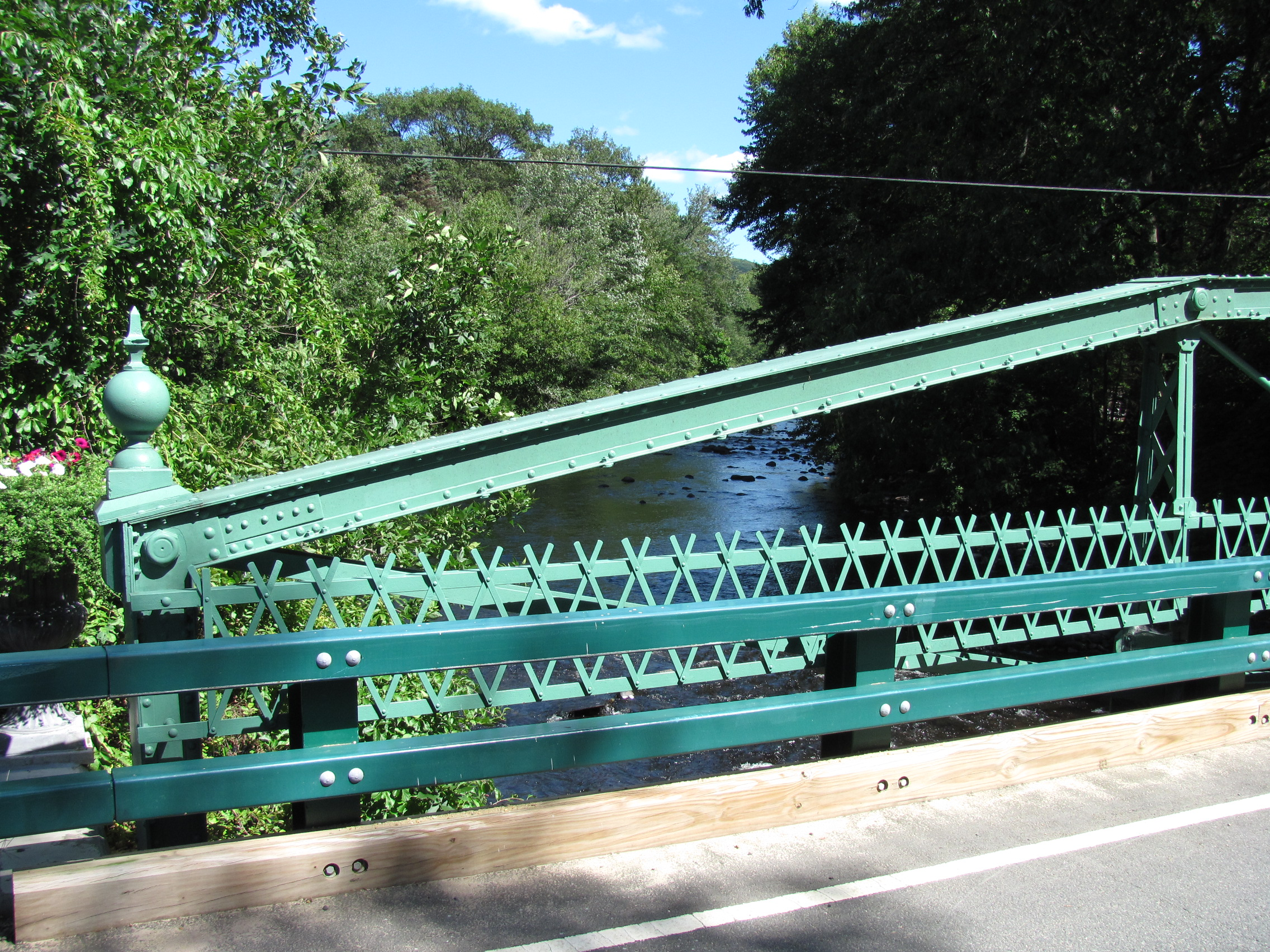
Detail

The Crossman Bridge is located just west of West Warren, on Gilbert Road just south of its junction with Main Street (Massachusetts Route 67). The bridge is 73 feet (22 m) long and 18 feet (5.5 m) wide, and is mounted on concrete abutments topped with granite slabs. The lenticular trusses have a maximum depth of about 8 feet (2.4 m). The bridge deck is supported by a modern system of steel beams and stringers. A decorative railing, originally protective in nature, has been preserved, augmented by a modern guard rail.

The bridge was built in 1888 by the Berlin Iron Bridge Co. at a cost $2,175. It is only one of three known lenticular bridges in the state, and the only one that is a pony truss (without connection between the trusses above the roadway). It was the first metal bridge on the site, which has a history of bridge crossings dating to 1795. It was named for the A. W. Crossman factory, which stood just south of the river to the east of Gilbert Road. From 2004 to 2008, it was removed for repairs, rehabilitated and reassembled by U.S. Bridge of Cambridge, Ohio.

== See also ==
- National Register of Historic Places listings in Worcester County, Massachusetts
- List of bridges on the National Register of Historic Places in Massachusetts
