= Needham Street Bridge =

- U.S. National Register of Historic Places
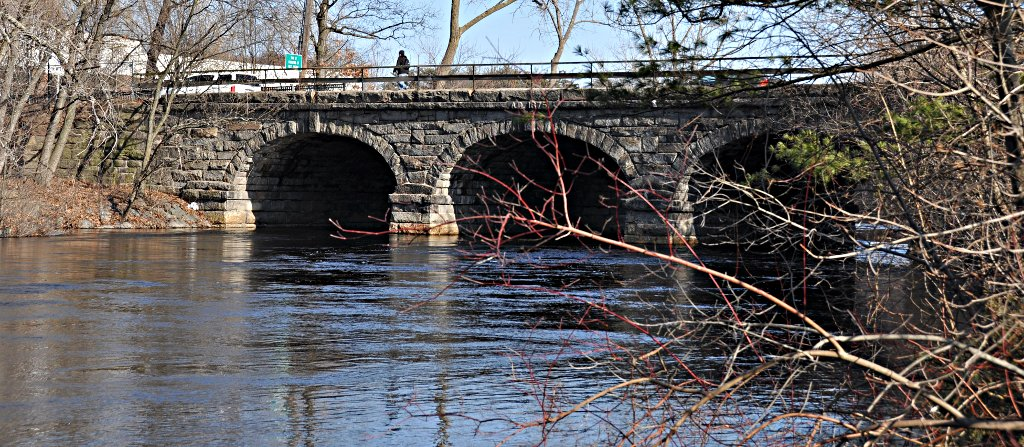

- Location within Greater Boston area Location within Massachusetts Location within the United States
- Location: Needham St. at Charles River, Needham and Newton, Massachusetts
- Coordinates: 42°18′23″N 71°13′3″W
- Built: 1875
- Architect: Blaisdell, Hiram; Wheeler, William
- Architectural style: Stone arch bridge
- MPS: Newton MRA
- NRHP reference No.: 86001852
- Added to NRHP: September 04, 1986

The Needham Street Bridge is a historic bridge at Needham Street over the Charles River connecting Needham and Newton, Massachusetts. The bridge was built in 1875, when Needham Street was laid out, connecting Newton Centre, Newton Highlands, and Needham center. It was designed and built by Hiram Blaisdell and William Wheeler, then in the early stages of a successful civil engineering career. The bridge is one of the finest surviving stone arch bridges in the Boston area. The bridge is distinctive among those that do survive as not having been widened.

The bridge has three spans, with a total length of 95 feet (29 m) and a roadway width of 40 feet (12 m); there are 65 feet (20 m) of wing walls along the river banks. Each span is a semi-elliptical arch spanning 27 feet (8.2 m). It is one of Newton's oldest bridges.

The bridge was listed on the National Register of Historic Places in 1986.

== See also ==
- List of bridges on the National Register of Historic Places in Massachusetts
- National Register of Historic Places listings in Newton, Massachusetts
- National Register of Historic Places listings in Norfolk County, Massachusetts
