= Quinapoxet River Bridge =

- U.S. National Register of Historic Places
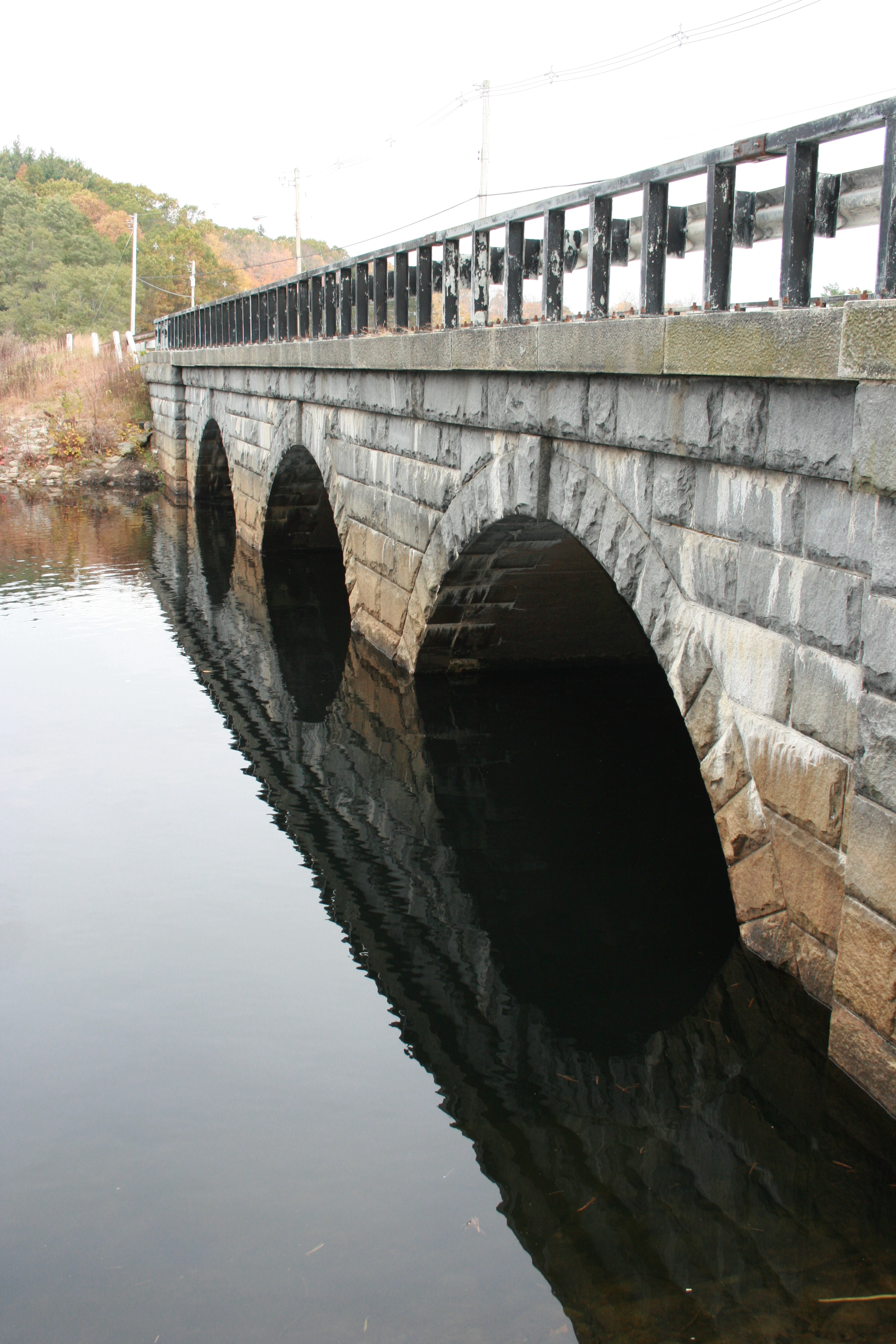

- Location within Massachusetts Location within the United States
- Location: West Boylston, Massachusetts
- Coordinates: 42°23′6″N 71°47′52″W
- Built: 1903
- Architect: George M. Atkins Co., Frederick P. Stearns
- MPS: Water Supply System of Metropolitan Boston MPS
- NRHP reference No.: 89002292
- Added to NRHP: April 8, 1990

The Quinapoxet River Bridge is a historic bridge in West Boylston, Massachusetts, USA, carrying Thomas Street over the Quinapoxet River near its mouth at the Wachusett Reservoir. It is a concrete bridge faced in ashlar stone and was built in 1903 as part of the reservoir's construction. The bridge uses unusual construction methods designed to make it appear like an aqueduct, in a manner similar to the Ash Street Bridge in Weston, built at the time of the construction of the Weston Aqueduct.

The bridge was listed on the National Register of Historic Places in 1990.

== See also ==
- National Register of Historic Places listings in Worcester County, Massachusetts
- List of bridges on the National Register of Historic Places in Massachusetts
