= Bigelow Tavern Historic District =

Historic district in Massachusetts, United States

- U.S. National Register of Historic Places
- U.S. Historic district
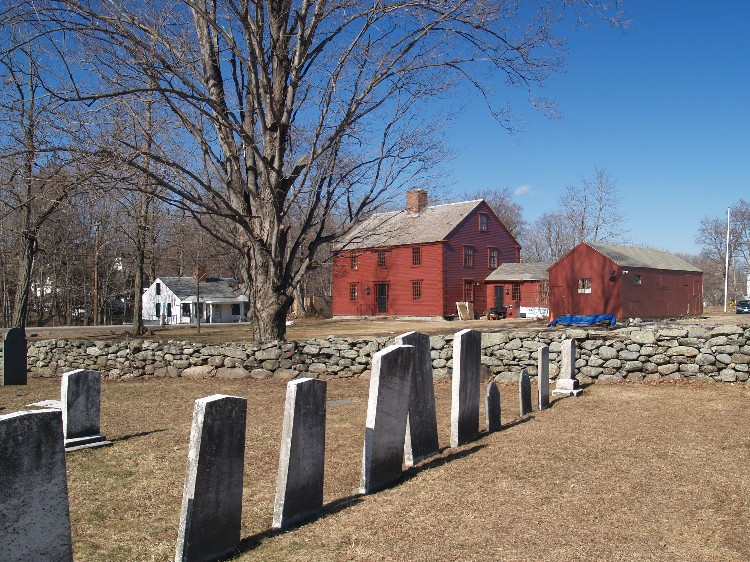

- Location within Massachusetts Location within the United States
- Location: 60, 64 and 65 Worcester Street, West Boylston, Massachusetts
- Coordinates: 42°21′55″N 71°46′55″W
- Area: 1.6 acres (0.65 ha)
- Built: 1810
- Architectural style: Georgian, Federal
- NRHP reference No.: 92000043
- Added to NRHP: September 24, 1992

The Bigelow Tavern Historic District is a historic district in West Boylston, Massachusetts. It consists of a cluster of three buildings: Bigelow Tavern, the White/Gibbs Store, and Temple's Distillery. The buildings have a history of common ownership, and the area was locally important from the late 18th century into the late 19th century. The district was added to the National Register of Historic Places in 1992.

== Description and history ==
The Bigelow Tavern and its associated properties are located in the village center of West Boylston, north of the town common on either side of Worcester Street (Massachusetts Routes 12 and 140). On the east side of the road stands the tavern, a 2 1/2-story wood-frame structure, three bays wide, with a side gable roof, central chimney, and clapboard siding. The building is oriented facing south, toward the cemetery, and has a single-story ell extending to the east, joining it to a 1 1/2-story shed. Across the street from the tavern stands a former distillery associated with the tavern; it appears as a three-bay 1 1/2-story Cape facing east. Although it has been converted to residential use, it retains a number of interior feature that appear to be distinctive to its original use as a distillery. North of the distillery stands the tavern store, a 2 1/2-story wood-frame structure, with a five-bay front facade and central entry. Its interior is arranged with a large room in the front, and smaller rooms in the rear flanking a central staircase.

The town of West Boylston was settled in the 18th century, and was incorporated in 1808 out of parts of neighboring towns. Its town common was laid out in 1795, when its first church was built, and it is around those that its village center grew. The Bigelow properties were built between about 1790 and 1810, and effectively functioned as the town's first commercial center. Ezra Bigelow was the first operator of the tavern, and members of his family and its descendants would operate it until 1833. The distillery, also an early operation, probably fell victim to the growing temperance movement. All of the businesses depended to some degree on the sale of alcohol, and were likely harmed by a decision to relocate the church further south after it burned down in 1832.

== See also ==
- National Register of Historic Places listings in Worcester County, Massachusetts
