= Burkeville Covered Bridge =

- U.S. National Register of Historic Places
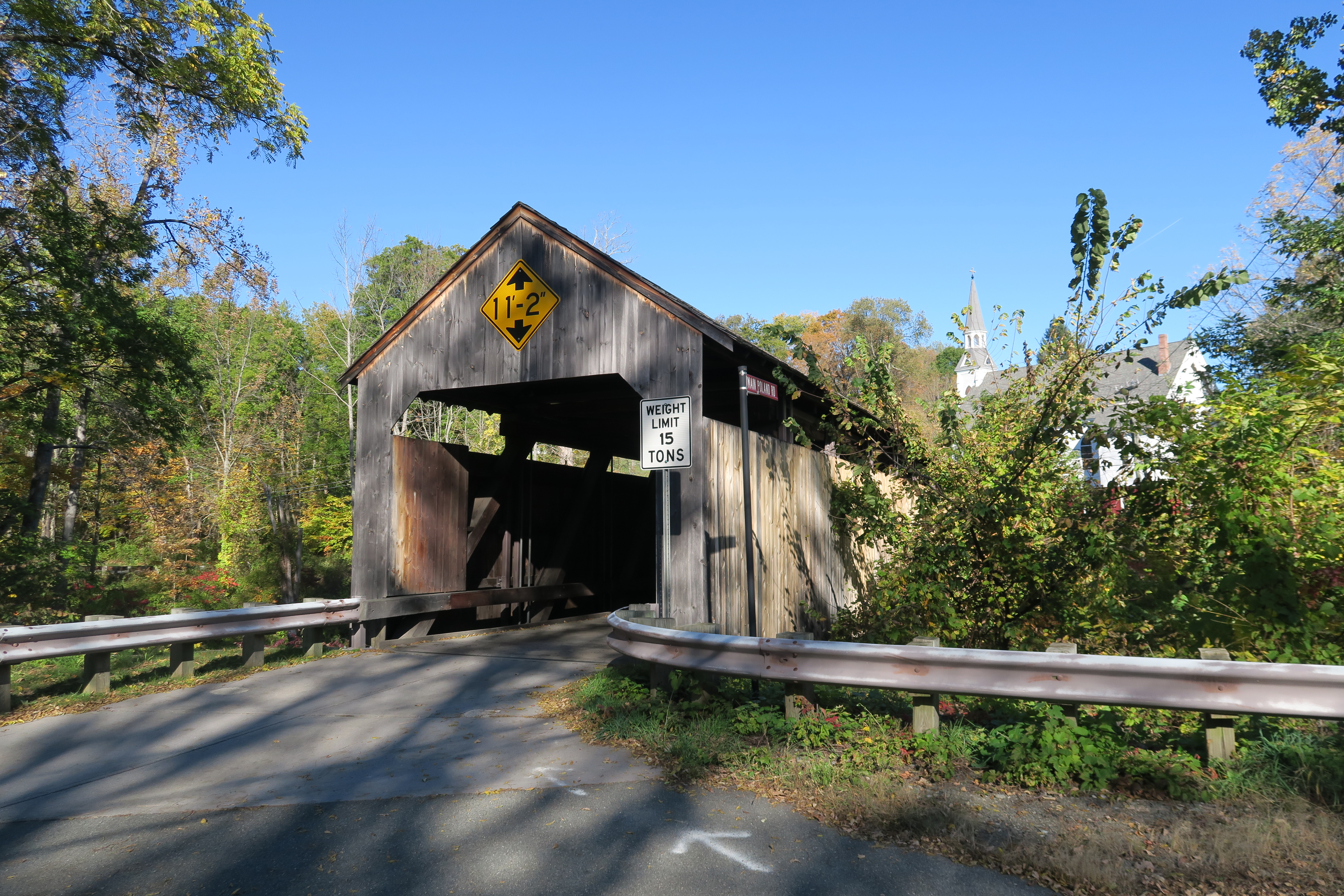
- Burkeville Covered Bridge

- Location within Massachusetts Location within the United States
- Location: Main Poland Road at South River, Conway, Massachusetts
- Coordinates: 42°30′28″N 72°42′40″W
- Area: less than one acre
- Built: 1870
- Architect: Sylvanus P. Sherman
- NRHP reference No.: 88001456
- Added to NRHP: September 9, 1988

The Burkeville Covered Bridge is a historic covered bridge, carrying Main Poland Road over the South River in Conway, Massachusetts. Probably built in 1870, it is a regionally rare example of a multiple kingrod bridge with iron tensioning verticals (a modified Howe truss system), and one of a few 19th century covered bridges to survive in Massachusetts. It was listed on the National Register of Historic Places in 1988.

== Description and history ==
The Burkeville Covered Bridge stands in the formerly industrial village of Burkeville, west of the center of Conway, carrying Main Poland Road over the South River just south of Massachusetts Route 116. It is of kingrod truss construction, with a total truss length of 106.5 inches (2.71 m) and a roadway width of 13 feet 6 inches (4.11 m) (one lane). It is covered by a gabled metal roof and its sides are finished in vertical board siding. Its wooden trusses, in contrast to kingpost trusses, have wrought iron verticals which transmit the active load to the top chord of the truss. In some places, fittings of the trusses have either been replaced or reinforced by steel components.

The first bridge on the site is thought to have been built in 1850, when Main Poland Road was rerouted to accommodate changes in the water impoundments for the industrial facilities then active in Burkeville. The present bridge was built in 1870 after that bridge was damaged in a major flood the previous year. It was closed after the 1938 New England hurricane weakened it, and it underwent major repairs. In the following years, its stone abutments were faced in concrete. Its roof partially collapsed under heavy snow in 1975, but was restored by town volunteers. It was closed for safety reasons in 1985, and reopened to vehicular traffic in November 2013 after renovations.

== See also ==
- National Register of Historic Places listings in Franklin County, Massachusetts
- List of bridges on the National Register of Historic Places in Massachusetts
- Arthur A. Smith Covered Bridge, Colrain
