= Atherton Bridge =

- U.S. National Register of Historic Places
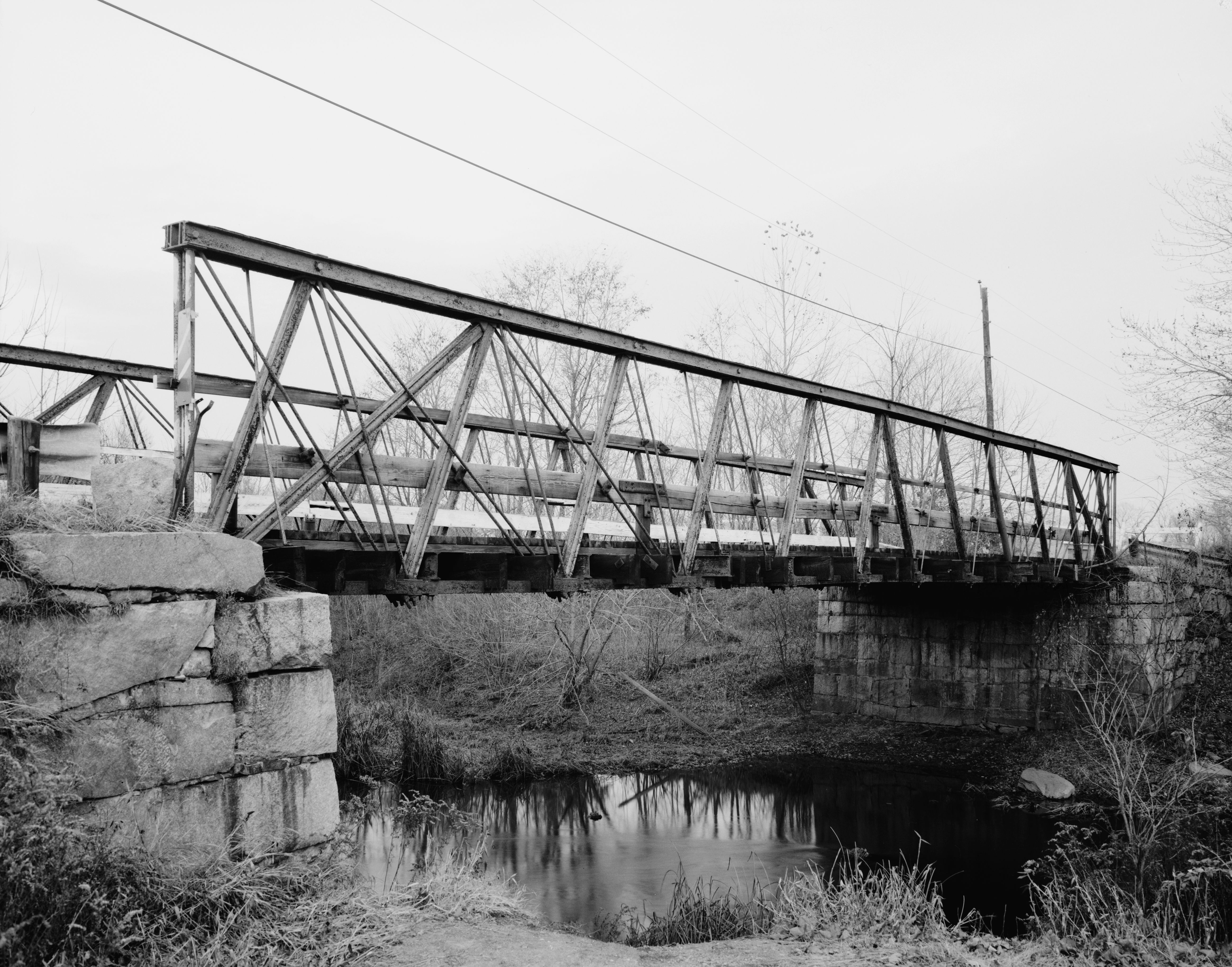
- Atherton Bridge, 1979

- Location within Massachusetts Location within the United States
- Location: Lancaster, Massachusetts
- Coordinates: 42°26′41″N 71°40′19″W
- Built: 1870
- NRHP reference No.: 79000377
- Added to NRHP: September 19, 1979

The Atherton Bridge is a historic iron truss bridge in Lancaster, Massachusetts, spanning the South Branch of the Nashua River. It is a rare example of a hybrid pony truss that is similar to the 19th century truss design of Simeon S. Post. It was built by J. H. Cofrode & Co. of Philadelphia in 1870. It was the first iron bridge to be constructed in the town. The bridge was added to the National Register of Historic Places in 1979.

The bridge formerly carried Bolton Road, but was closed to vehicular traffic in 1975 and bypassed by a modern highway bridge in the 1980s.

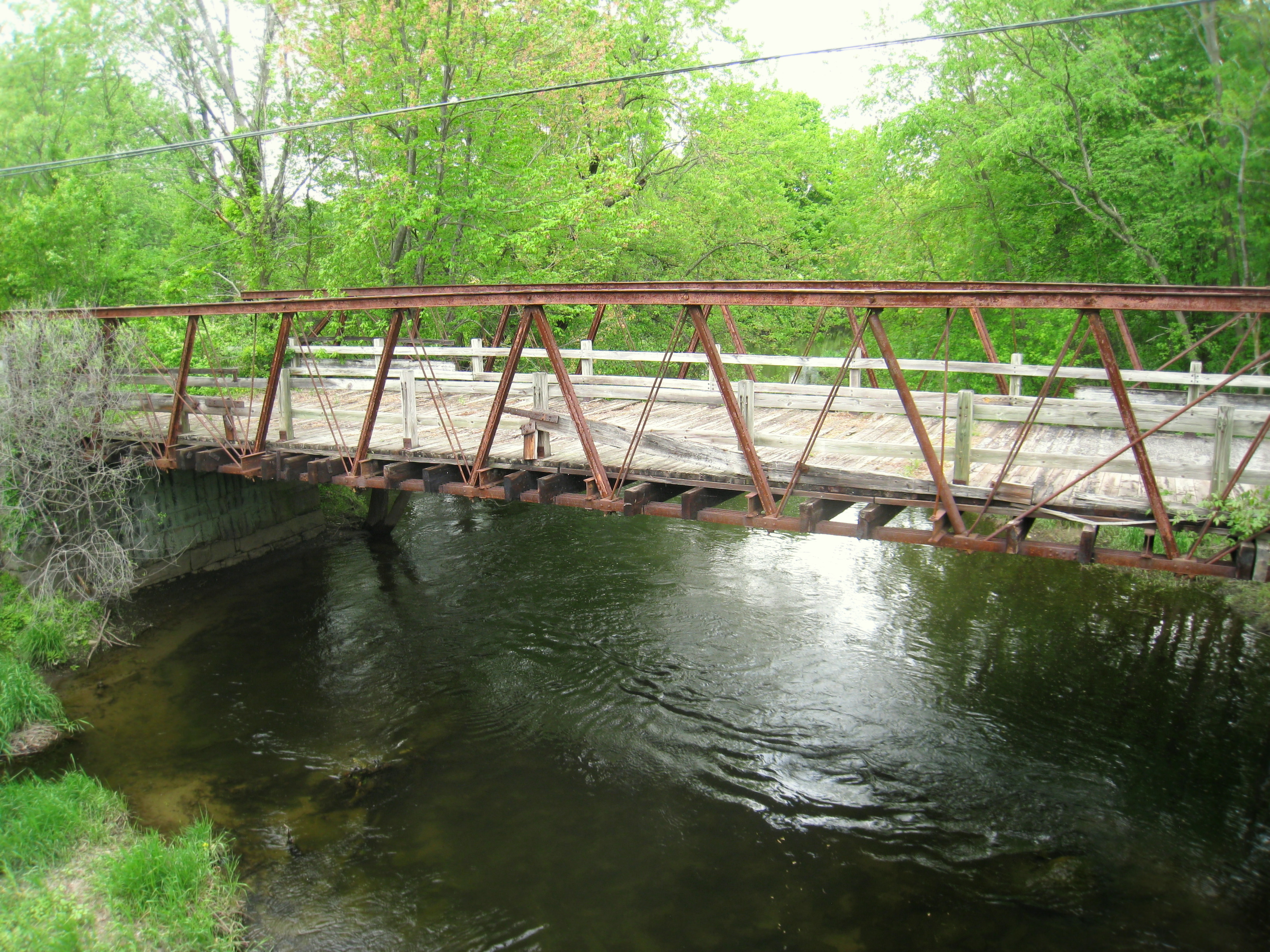
Atherton Bridge in 2009

The bridge remained open to pedestrian traffic until April 2020, when a flash flood damaged the bridge's wooden deck and it was closed to all traffic. The long-term future of the bridge is uncertain.

The sign commemorating Atherton Bridge states:

ATHERTON BRIDGE There has been a bridge at this location since early settlement. It is named for James Atherton, one of the signers of the petition for incorporation of the town in 1652. The 1794 map lists the bridge as 90 feet long on a county way Lancaster’s first iron bridge was placed here in 1870.

== Technical information ==
The Atherton Bridge has iron compression posts that incline inward towards the center of the span and diagonal tension rods that incline outward towards the abutments. Unusual features include double end posts with adjustable turnbuckles, channeled castings to join the lower chord bars, and patented Phoenix columns for all inclined posts. This bridge does not make use of Simeon Post's patented joints. The floor beams support a wood plank deck.

The bridge is 72 feet (22 m) long and 18.5 feet (5.6 m) feet wide, and is composed of eight panels. It rests on granite abutments.

The bridge was photographed in 1979 by Jet Lowe of the Historic American Engineering Record, and documented in 1990 as part of the Massachusetts Historic Bridge Project. At that time, it was one of only two known examples of the Post type of truss still surviving.

== See also ==
- Ponakin Bridge
- National Register of Historic Places listings in Worcester County, Massachusetts
- List of bridges documented by the Historic American Engineering Record in Massachusetts
- List of bridges on the National Register of Historic Places in Massachusetts
