= Mount Vernon Cemetery (West Boylston, Massachusetts) =

Historic cemetery in Massachusetts, United States

- U.S. National Register of Historic Places
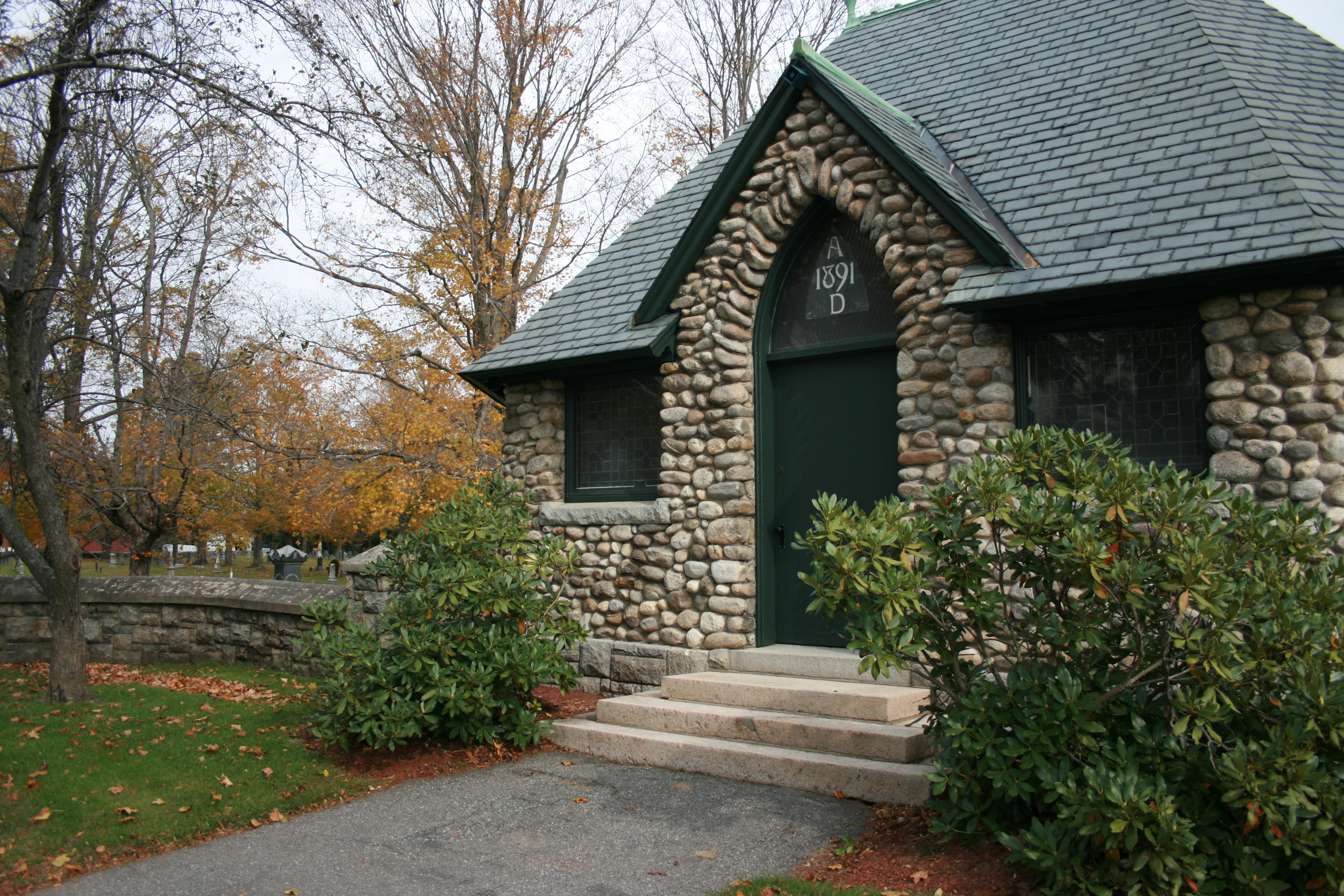

- Location within Massachusetts Location within the United States
- Location: Church St., West Boylston, Massachusetts
- Coordinates: 42.3633°N 71.7797°W
- Area: 16.7 acres (6.8 ha)
- Built: 1757
- Architectural style: Victorian Eclectic
- NRHP reference No.: 08000465
- Added to NRHP: May 29, 2008

Mount Vernon Cemetery is a historic cemetery on Church Street in West Boylston, Massachusetts. It is actually composed of three separate cemeteries, which were eventually united under municipal ownership in the early decades of the 20th century. The oldest of them, the Beaman cemetery, dates to c. 1757 and is the town's oldest cemetery. It was forced to relocate to its present location next to the 1852 Mount Vernon Cemetery by the creation in 1904 of the Wachusett Reservoir; the association which owned the cemetery turned its resources over to the town ten years later. The Old Burying Ground was established c. 1790, and is the only originally municipal portion of the cemetery. The 1852 Mount Vernon Cemetery portion is the largest of the three, was designed in the rural cemetery style popular in the mid-19th century, and is where the cemetery's 1891 Holbrook Chapel is located.

The cemetery was listed on the National Register of Historic Places in 2008.

== See also ==
- National Register of Historic Places listings in Worcester County, Massachusetts
