= Arthur A. Smith Covered Bridge =

- U.S. National Register of Historic Places
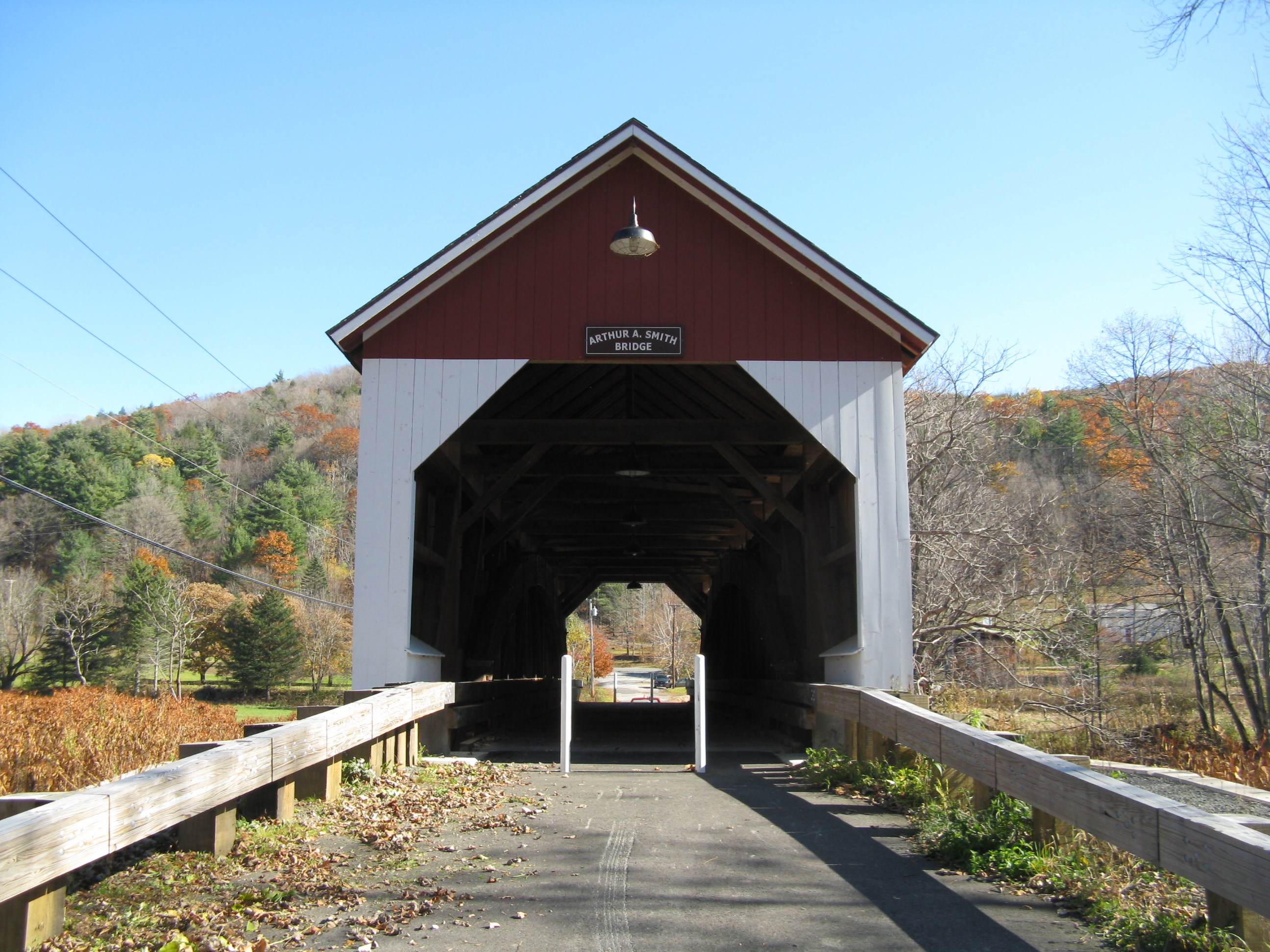

- Location within Massachusetts Location within the United States
- Location: Lyonsville Road over the North River, Colrain, Massachusetts
- Coordinates: 42°40′12″N 72°43′9″W
- Area: less than one acre
- Built: 1868
- NRHP reference No.: 83000592
- Added to NRHP: February 3, 1983

The Arthur A. Smith Covered Bridge is a historic covered bridge, carrying Lyonsville Road across the North River in Colrain, Massachusetts, United States. Built in 1869, it is one of two Burr truss bridges in the state (the other being the Quinebaug River bridge), and is one of a few 19th century covered bridges in the state. It was listed on the National Register of Historic Places in 1983.

== Description and history ==
The Arthur A. Smith Covered Bridge is located west of Colrain's village center, carrying Lyonsville Road across the North River a short way west of Massachusetts Route 112. The bridge is 100 feet (30 m) long, with an outside width of 17 feet (5.2 m) and an inside width of 12 feet (3.7 m), sufficient for one lane of traffic. Much of the slate on its gabled roof was reclaimed from the original bridge roof. The exterior is windowless with vertical pine board siding. The structure is of a Burr Truss. Ten braced king posts are tensioned by sweeping segmented timber arches that sandwich the braced posts.

In 1920 the bridge was strengthened with the addition two great laminated lumber arches. 2" X 12" spruce planks were bent and stacked to arch from abutment to abutment following the curve of the original Burr Truss arch. Threaded steel rods hang from these arches to hold the bridge deck support beams.

The bridge was built in 1869 to cross the North River in Colrain Massachusetts close to where it is joined by the Fox Brook. The site is vulnerable to flooding and the Fox Bridge was soon severely damaged by flood in 1878. It then sat abandoned until 1896, when the town voted to rehabilitate it and moved it to its present location, where it served as part of the main road to Heath. The area was then known as the "Arthur A. Smith Flats", after a prominent local resident who lived in the area. In 1982 it was taken out of service and moved to adjacent land. Following a $2.1M rebuilding in 2007 a recreation of the Arthur A Smith was placed back over the river but was not opened to vehicular traffic at that time. It was re-opened to traffic in 2021.

The Bridge was only slightly damaged during the record flooding of Hurricane Irene in 2011. This is due to its having been placed on abutments that lift it high above the surrounding floodplain.

== See also ==
- Burkeville Covered Bridge, in Charlemont
- Bissell Bridge (Massachusetts), also in Charlemont
- National Register of Historic Places listings in Franklin County, Massachusetts
