= Coleman Bridge (Windsor, Massachusetts) =

- U.S. National Register of Historic Places
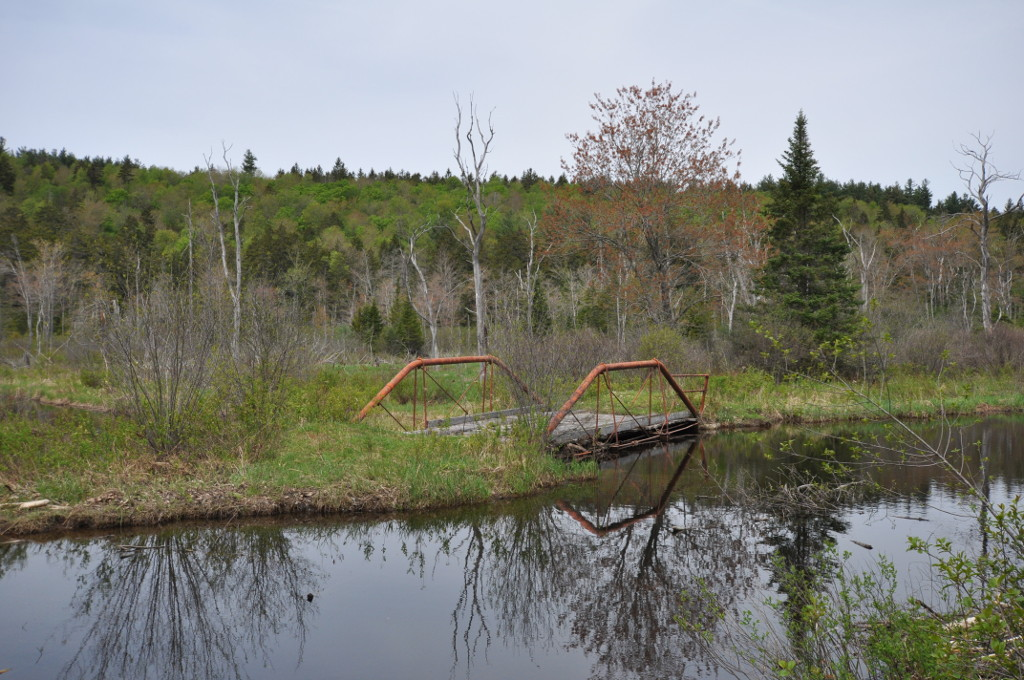
- Coleman Bridge, 2015

- Location within Massachusetts Location within the United States
- Location: Windsor, Massachusetts
- Coordinates: 42°31′56″N 72°59′36″W
- Area: less than one acre
- Built: c. 1894
- Architect: Ball, Charles H.
- Architectural style: Iron pipe (Ball patent) truss
- NRHP reference No.: 00000112
- Added to NRHP: February 18, 2000

Coleman Bridge is a historic Ball-patent pipe pony truss bridge in Windsor, Massachusetts. It is the only known surviving in situ bridge of its type, one of about two dozen built in western New England. It is located on an abandoned stretch of Windsor Bush Road which crosses Phelps Brook in what is now a remote upland section of Windsor. The bridge was located near farms owned by the Coleman family, giving the bridge its name. The bridge type was invented by Charles H. Ball, an entrepreneur from nearby Peru who developed the idea of using pipes as structural elements of bridges over smaller bodies of water. Only three instances are known to exist, two of which were (as of 2000) disassembled and in storage.

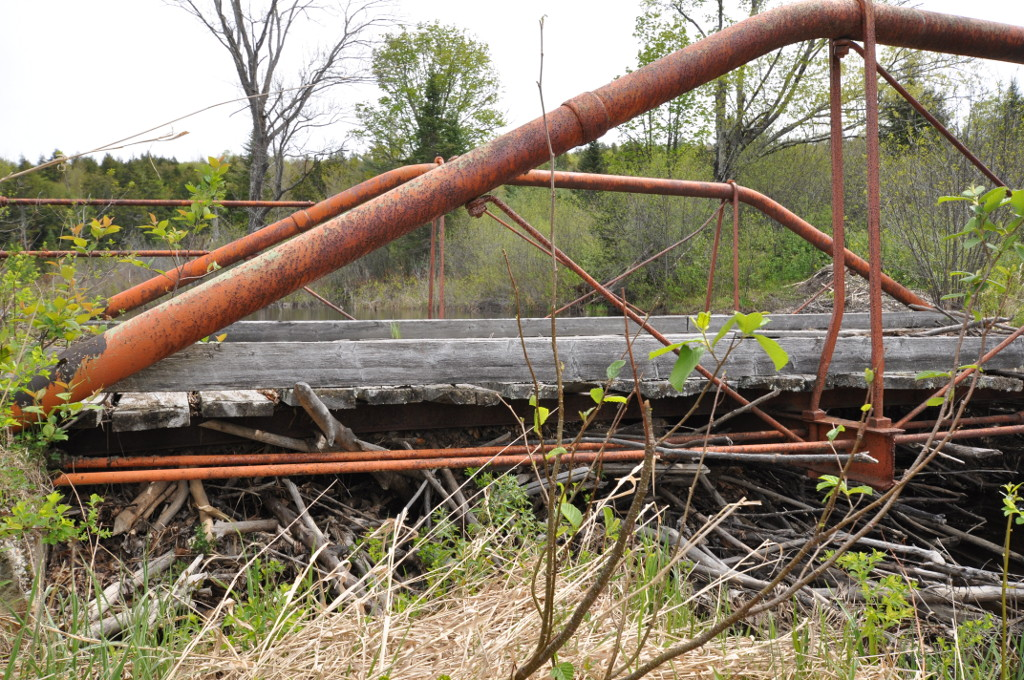
Detail of bridge; note beaver dam underneath structure

The bridge was probably built in the 1890s, when Ball was at his height as a bridge builder, and did regular work for the Windsor highway department. The bridge elements were manufactured in Ball's small East Windsor shop. It was built on the site where there had previously been a wooden bridge, and spans 31 feet (9.4 m). The top cords of the pony truss are pipes 5.75 inches (14.6 cm) in diameter, with doubled iron rods functioning as the truss's bottom chord. The bridge originally had wooden stringers, which were at some point replaced by iron ones. The wooden floor of the bridge is also a replacement. The bridge is accessible on foot, but is impacted by the construction of beaver dams nearby and underneath the structure. It was listed on the National Register of Historic Places in 2000.

== See also ==
- List of bridges documented by the Historic American Engineering Record in Massachusetts
- List of bridges on the National Register of Historic Places in Massachusetts
- National Register of Historic Places listings in Berkshire County, Massachusetts
