= Oakdale Village Historic District =

Historic district in Massachusetts, United States

- U.S. National Register of Historic Places
- U.S. Historic district
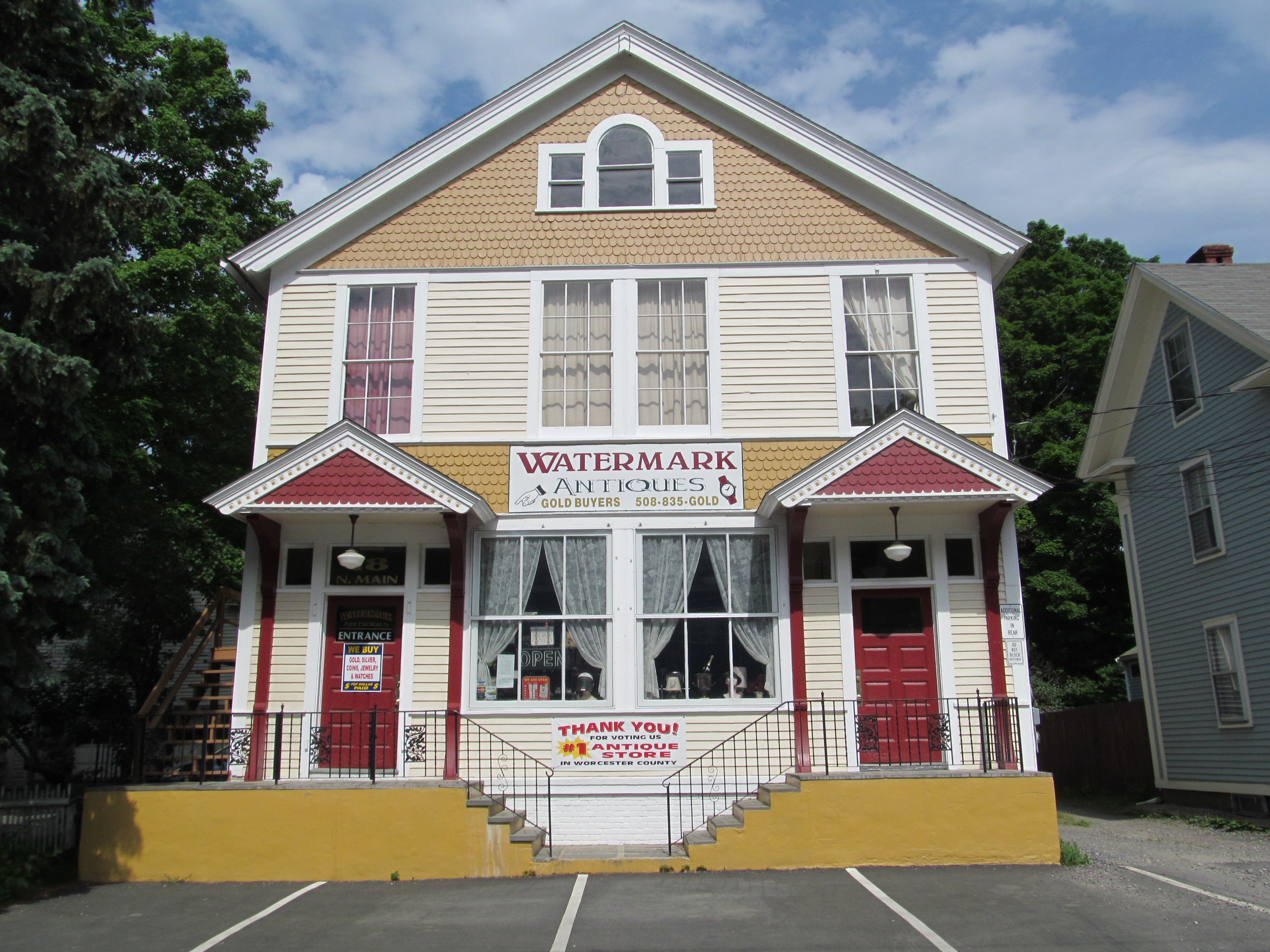
- Watermark Antiques

- Location within Massachusetts Location within the United States
- Location: West Boylston, Massachusetts
- Coordinates: 42°23′20″N 71°47′48″W
- Built: 1780
- Architectural style: Greek Revival, Italianate, Gothic
- NRHP reference No.: 96000738
- Added to NRHP: July 5, 1996

The Oakdale Village Historic District is a historic district encompassing the small 19th-century village of Oakdale in West Boylston, Massachusetts. Located at the confluence of the Stillwater and Quinepoxet Rivers near their outlet into the Wachusett Reservoir, the village consists mainly of Greek Revival houses, although later Victorian styles are also present in smaller numbers. Its state of preservation is partly because development in the area was effectively halted when the process of building the reservoir began in the 1890s. A significant portion of the village was destroyed to make way for the reservoir, and railroads and industry were forced to relocate.

The district was added to the National Register of Historic Places in 1996.

== See also ==
- National Register of Historic Places listings in Worcester County, Massachusetts
