= Old Town Bridge (Wayland, Massachusetts) =

- U.S. National Register of Historic Places
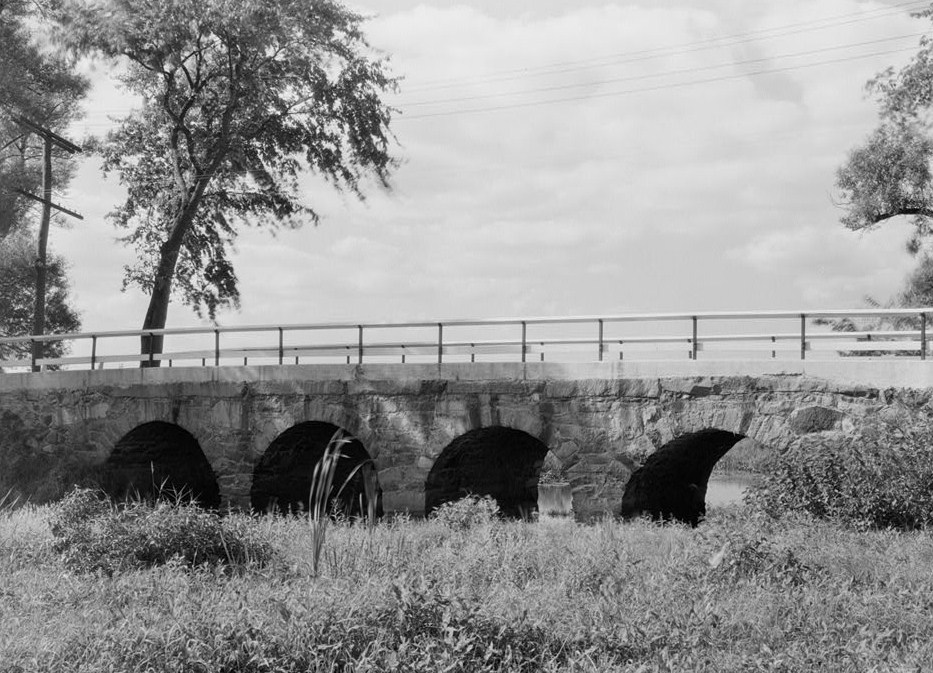
- Old Town Bridge in 1935

- Location within Massachusetts Location within the United States
- Nearest city: Wayland, Massachusetts
- Coordinates: 42°22′31″N 71°22′49″W
- Built: 1848
- Architect: Josiah Russell
- NRHP reference No.: 75000292
- Added to NRHP: May 2, 1975

The Old Town Bridge is a historic stone arch bridge in Wayland, Massachusetts. It is located just north of Old Sudbury Road, and is sited across what was formerly a channel of the Sudbury River, which now flows just west and north of the bridge. The four-arch bridge was built in 1848 by Josiah Russell on a site where it is supposed that the first bridge in Middlesex County was built in the 1640s. It was for many years on the major east–west route connecting Boston to points west and south. Originally built of dry-laid stone, the bridge was rebuilt with mortar after being damaged by flooding in 1900. It is 60 feet (18 m) long and has a roadbed 20 feet (6.1 m) wide, with each arch spanning about 10 feet (3.0 m). The bridge was open to vehicular traffic until 1955.

The bridge was listed on the National Register of Historic Places in 1975.

== See also ==
- List of bridges on the National Register of Historic Places in Massachusetts
- National Register of Historic Places listings in Middlesex County, Massachusetts
