= West Boylston, Massachusetts =

- Town
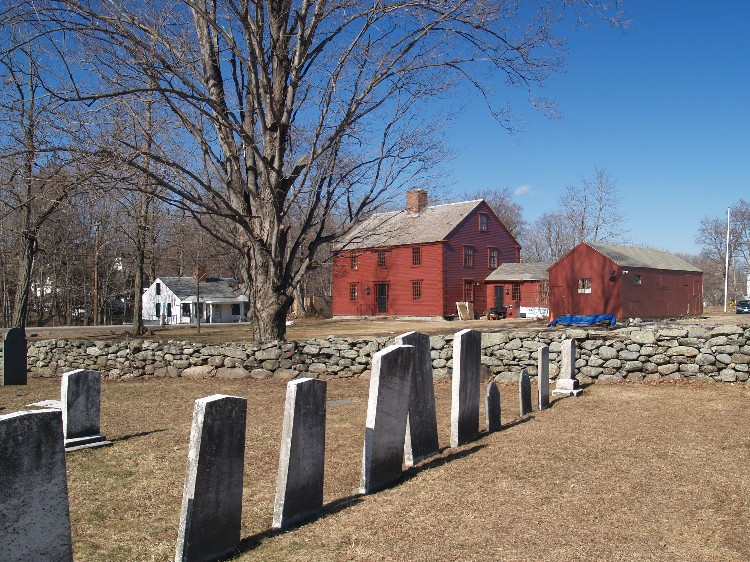
- Bigelow Tavern (Historical Society)

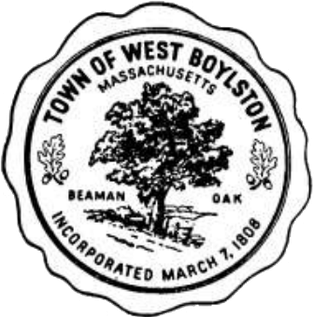
- Seal
- Motto: "Small Town, Big Heart" The town motto was penned by Lionel Bella in 2010.
- Location in Worcester County and the state of Massachusetts.
- Coordinates: 42°22′00″N 71°47′10″W
- Country: United States
- State: Massachusetts
- County: Worcester
- Settled: 1642
- Incorporated: 1808

Government
  - Type: Open town meeting
  - Town Administrator: Vacant
  - Select Board: Kristina Pedone, Chair; James Morrissey, Vice-Chair; Marc Frieden, Clerk Barur R. Rajeshkumar; Vanessa Kuzmanovski

Area
  - Total: 13.8 sq mi (35.8 km^{2})
  - Land: 12.9 sq mi (33.4 km^{2})
  - Water: 0.97 sq mi (2.5 km^{2})
- Elevation: 482 ft (147 m)

Population (2020)
  - Total: 7,877
  - Density: 611/sq mi (236/km^{2})
- Time zone: UTC−5 (Eastern)
  - Summer (DST): UTC−4 (Eastern)
- ZIP Codes: 01583 (West Boylston); 01606 (Worcester)
- Area code: 508/774
- FIPS code: 25-75155
- GNIS feature ID: 0618391
- Website: www.westboylston-ma.gov

West Boylston is a town in Worcester County, Massachusetts, United States and a northern suburb of Worcester. The population was 7,877 at the 2020 census. West Boylston includes the village of Oakdale, located on the opposite side of the Wachusett Reservoir from West Boylston center along Route 140. Although the town was split off from Boylston, it has a larger population than its eastern namesake.

== History ==
West Boylston was originally part of several neighboring towns—Lancaster, Shrewsbury, Boylston, Holden and Sterling. The town was created as part of a dispute between Boylston and West Boylston over the location of a new town meeting house. The town was officially incorporated in 1808.

During the 1800s the town grew with textile and other industries and became a prosperous community. This prosperity was interrupted as the town was selected as the site of the Wachusett Reservoir to provide water for Boston. It was selected due to its location at the junction of three rivers: the Quinapoxet River, the Stillwater River and the Nashua River. In 1897, the Nashua River in the town of Clinton was impounded by the Wachusett Dam, causing 6.5 square miles (17 km^{2}) to be flooded in the towns of Boylston, West Boylston, Clinton and Sterling. Over 2,200 acres (8.9 km^{2}) of West Boylston's land was used for the reservoir, the most of any town. This disrupted the center of town and most of the industrial base. Many buildings were moved to the unaffected parts of the town but the majority were demolished and filled by the reservoir. Over 1700 residents, 300 homes, eight schools, six mills, four churches and one hotel were moved to dry land. The state paid approximately 60 cents on the dollar for use of the land with the promise to pay $12,000 a year to the town for lost tax revenue forever. The reservoir was completed in 1905 and first filled in May 1908. West Boylston's prominent landmark, the Old Stone Church, was left remaining as a reminder of those that lost their homes and jobs to the building of the reservoir. It is one of the most photographed sites in the area.

Today, West Boylston has transformed itself into a bedroom community for Worcester and the surrounding region. Due to the reservoir, the town has been able to preserve much of its rural character, making it an attractive place for recreation and living.

West Boylston's most famous historical resident is Robert Bailey Thomas, the founder of the Old Farmer's Almanac. Harry Stubbs, who later wrote science fiction as Hal Clement, taught science at Major Edwards High School for two years in the late 1940s.

== Geography ==
According to the United States Census Bureau, the town has a total area of 13.8 square miles (36 km^{2}), of which 12.9 square miles (33 km^{2}) is land and 0.9 square miles (2.3 km^{2}), or 6.86%, is water. The main water source is the Wachusett Reservoir, which is located in the middle of the town. The town does not get use of this water, it is for Boston. West Boylston gets its water from two town wells.

=== Adjacent cities and towns ===
West Boylston is bordered by Sterling to the north, Holden to the west, Worcester, to the south, Shrewsbury to the southeast, and Boylston to the east.

== Demographics ==
Historical population
| Year | Pop. | ±% |
|---|---|---|
| 1850 | 1,749 | — |
| 1860 | 2,509 | +43.5% |
| 1870 | 2,862 | +14.1% |
| 1880 | 2,994 | +4.6% |
| 1890 | 3,019 | +0.8% |
| 1900 | 2,314 | −23.4% |
| 1910 | 1,270 | −45.1% |
| 1920 | 1,624 | +27.9% |
| 1930 | 2,114 | +30.2% |
| 1940 | 1,822 | −13.8% |
| 1950 | 2,570 | +41.1% |
| 1960 | 5,526 | +115.0% |
| 1970 | 6,369 | +15.3% |
| 1980 | 6,204 | −2.6% |
| 1990 | 6,611 | +6.6% |
| 2000 | 7,481 | +13.2% |
| 2010 | 7,669 | +2.5% |
| 2020 | 7,877 | +2.7% |
| 2022 | 7,757 | −1.5% |
U.S. Decennial Census

As of the 2010 Census, there were 7,669 people, 2,616 households, and 1,817 families residing in the town. The population density was 594.5 inhabitants per square mile (229.5/km^{2}). There were 2,746 housing units at an average density of 212.9 per square mile (82.2/km^{2}). The racial makeup of the town was 93.34% White, 4.21% African American, 0.22% Native American, 0.68% Asian, 0.03% Pacific Islander, 0.86% from other races, and 0.67% from two or more races. Hispanic or Latino of any race were 5.27% of the population.

There were 2,616 households, out of which 27.2% had children under the age of 18 living with them, 56.7% were married couples living together, 9.4% had a female householder with no husband present, and 30.5% were non-families. Of all households 25.9% were made up of individuals, and 11.8% had someone living alone who was 65 years of age or older. The average household size was 2.43 and the average family size was 2.98.

In the town, the population was spread out, with 17.5% under the age of 18, 6.5% from 18 to 24, 24.7% from 25 to 44, 33.7% from 45 to 64, and 17.6% who were 65 years of age or older. The median age was 46 years. For every 100 females there were 124.0 males. For every 100 females age 18 and over, there were 130.2 males. [The population of West Boylston (7,669 in 2010) includes the 1,137 male residents of the Worcester County House of Correction; 14.8% of the town's recorded population. So it would seem that West Boylston has about 25% more males than females (124 males for every 100 females) but that statistic is misleading.]

According the 2015–2019 American Community Survey, the median household income in the town was $88,906, and the median income for a family was $122,500. The per capita income for the town was $34,741. About 5.3% of families and 9.5% of the population were below the poverty line, including 15.0% of those under age 18 and 6.4% of those age 65 or over.

== Arts and culture ==
=== Museums and other points of interest ===
West Boylston includes six entries on the National Register of Historic Places:

- Beaman Memorial Public Library (added May 16, 2016)
- Bigelow Tavern Historic District – 60, 64 and 65 Worcester St. (added September 24, 1992)
- Mount Vernon Cemetery (added May 29, 2008)
- Oakdale Village Historic District – 11–68 N. Main, May 8–24, 6–10 Green, 12–23 High, 4–68 Laurel, 14–34 Waushacum, and park at Thomas and N. Main (added July 5, 1996)
- Old Stone Church – Off MA 140 (added April 13, 1973)
- Quinapoxet River Bridge – Thomas St. over the Quinapoxet River at the Wachusett Reservoir (added April 8, 1990)

West Boylston features a section of the Mass Central Rail Trail, a partially completed shared-use rail trail extending across Massachusetts between Northampton and Boston.

== Government ==
State government
| State Representative(s): | Jim O'Day (D) |
| State Senator(s): | Robyn Kennedy (D-1st Worcester district) |
| Governor's Councilor(s): | Paul DePalo (D) |
Federal government
| U.S. Representative(s): | James P. McGovern (D-2nd District), |
| U.S. Senators: | Elizabeth Warren (D), Ed Markey (D) |

== Education ==
West Boylston Middle/High School and Major Edwards Elementary School are located in the town.

== Library ==
West Boylston's public library, the Beaman Memorial Public Library, was established in 1878. In fiscal year 2008, the town of West Boylston spent 1.6% ($308,576) of its budget on its public library—approximately $37 per person, per year ($48.76 adjusted for inflation to 2022). The library building was listed on the National Register of Historic Places in 2016.

== Media ==
The Item newspaper covers current news about West Boylston; CherryRoad Media publishes it. In the past, other newspapers have included the News Recorder and West Boylston Times.

== Notable people ==
- Charlie Baker, professional baseball player
- Dyer Ball, missionary
- Erastus Brigham Bigelow, inventor and businessman, born in West Boylston
- Duke Farrell, MLB catcher
- Jim Ford, film and television actor / stuntman
- Jill Lepore, historian
- Bruce Marshall, professional hockey coach
- J. P. Ricciardi, former general manager of the Major League Baseball Toronto Blue Jays

== Photos ==
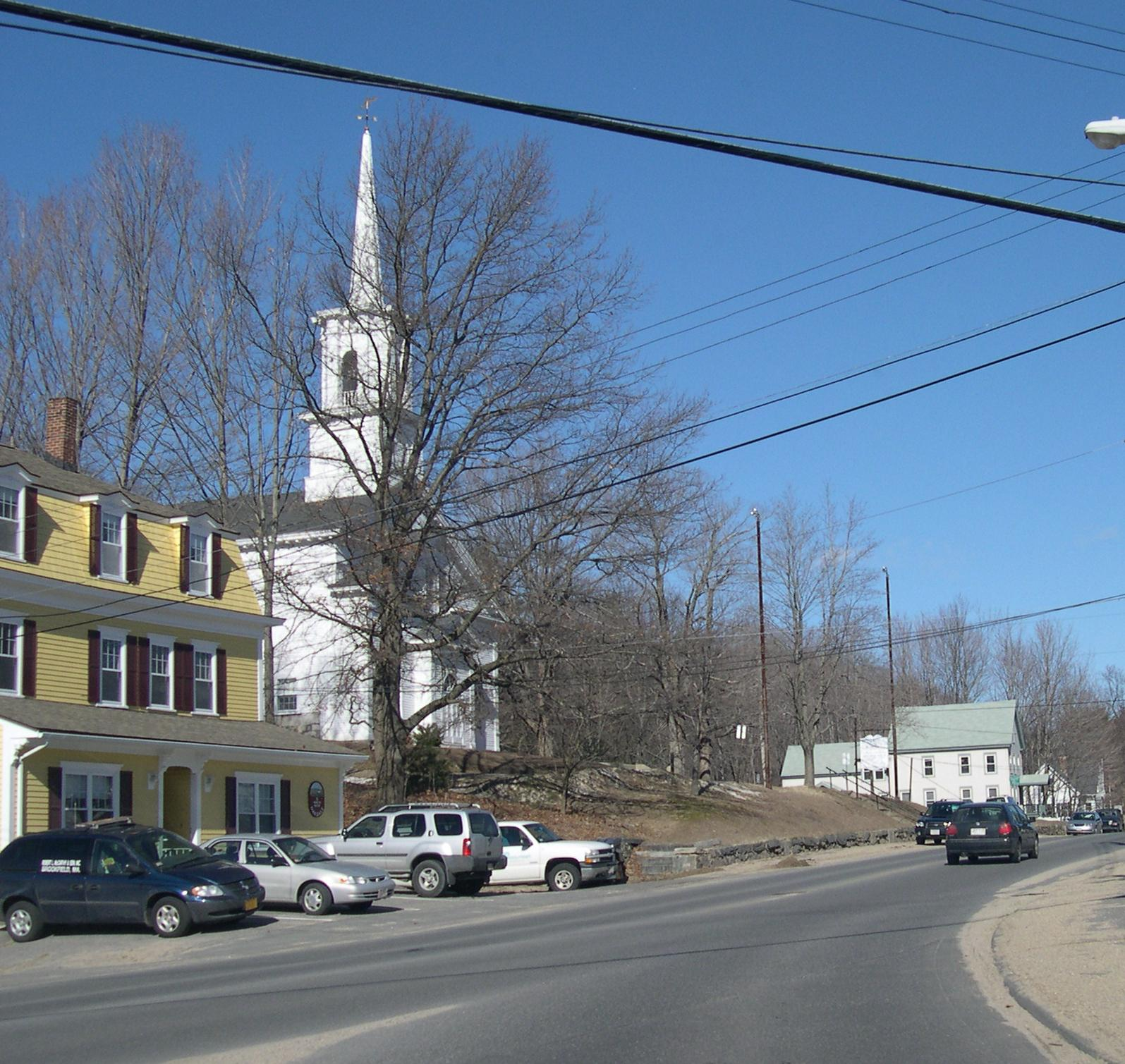
Oakdale, Massachusetts

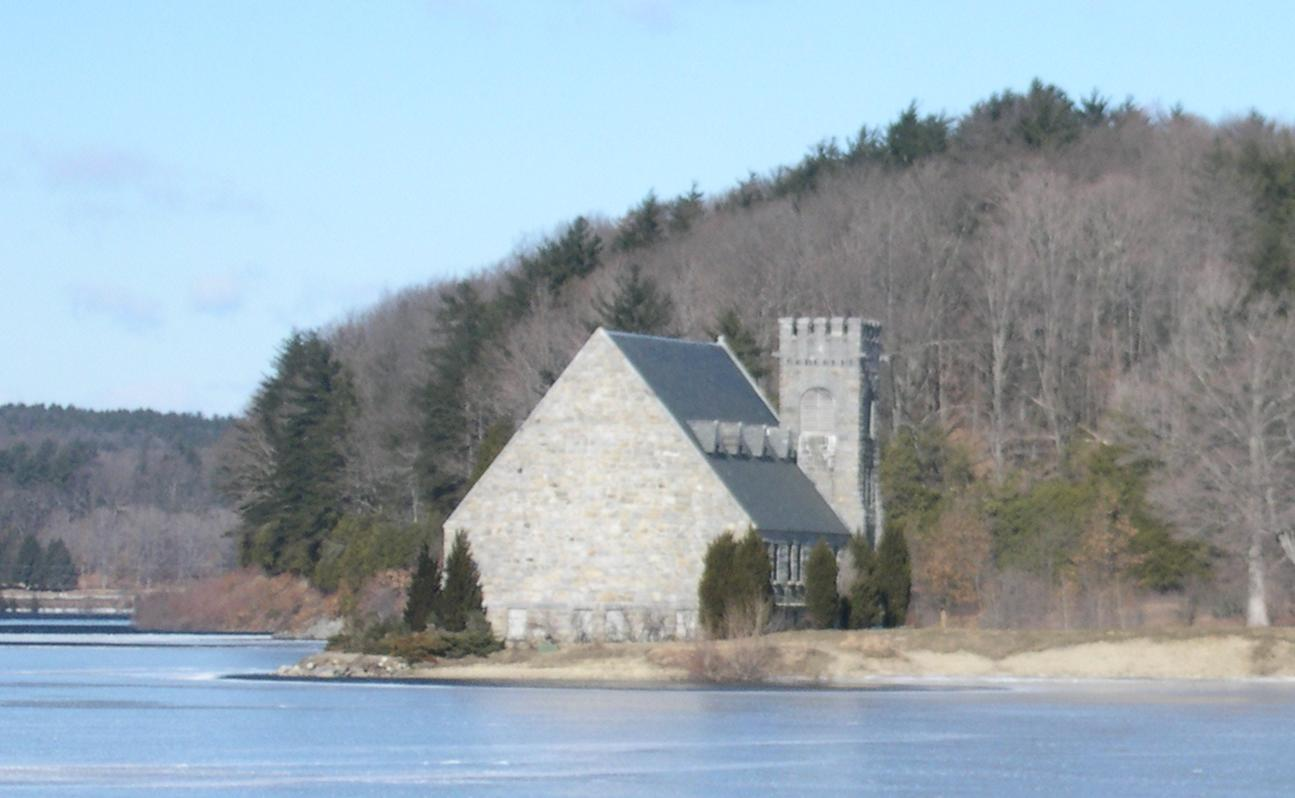
The Old Stone Church on the Wachusett Reservoir

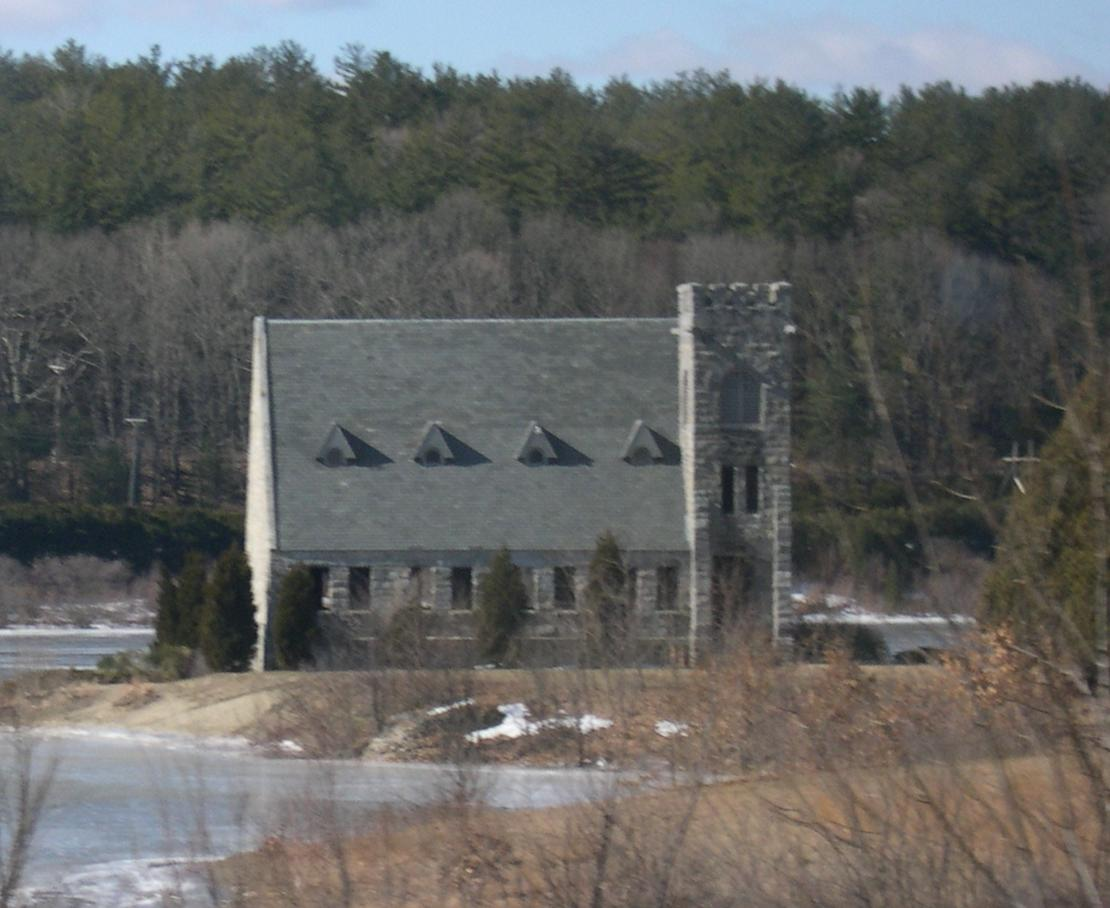

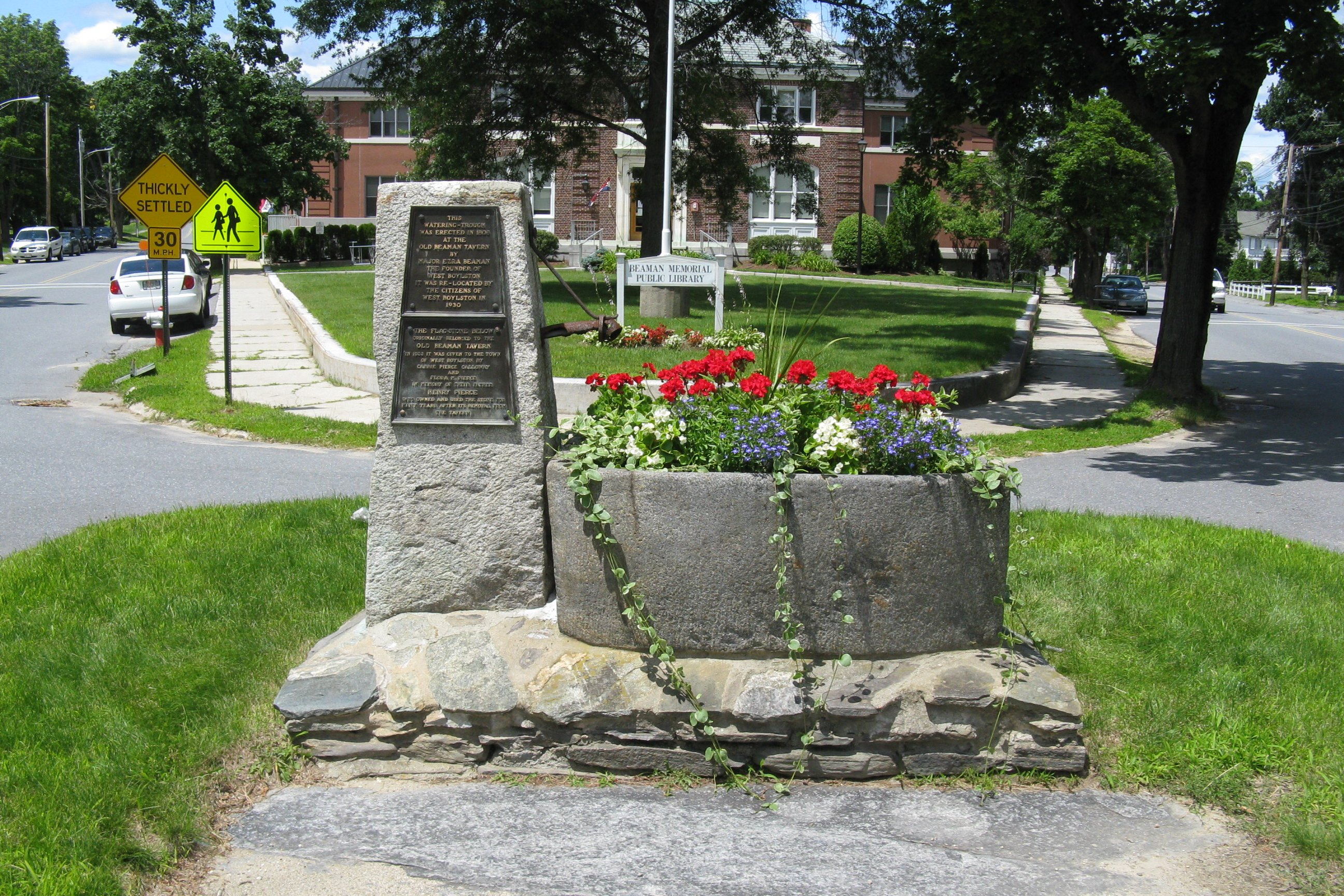
Watering trough in front of the Beaman Memorial Public Library
