= Still River =

Still River may refer to the following:

- Still River (novel), by Hal Clement

In Canada:

- Still River, Ontario

In the United States:

- Still River (Housatonic River), a tributary of the Housatonic River
- Still River (Nashua River), a tributary of the Nashua River in Bolton, Massachusetts
- Still River, Massachusetts, a village in Worcester County
