= John Whitcomb =

John Whitcomb may refer to:

- John C. Whitcomb, American theologian and young Earth creationist
- John Whitcomb (general), state representative and American Revolutionary War militia general

== See also ==
- Jon Whitcomb, American illustrator
