= Pan Historic District =

Historic district in Massachusetts, United States

- U.S. National Register of Historic Places
- U.S. Historic district
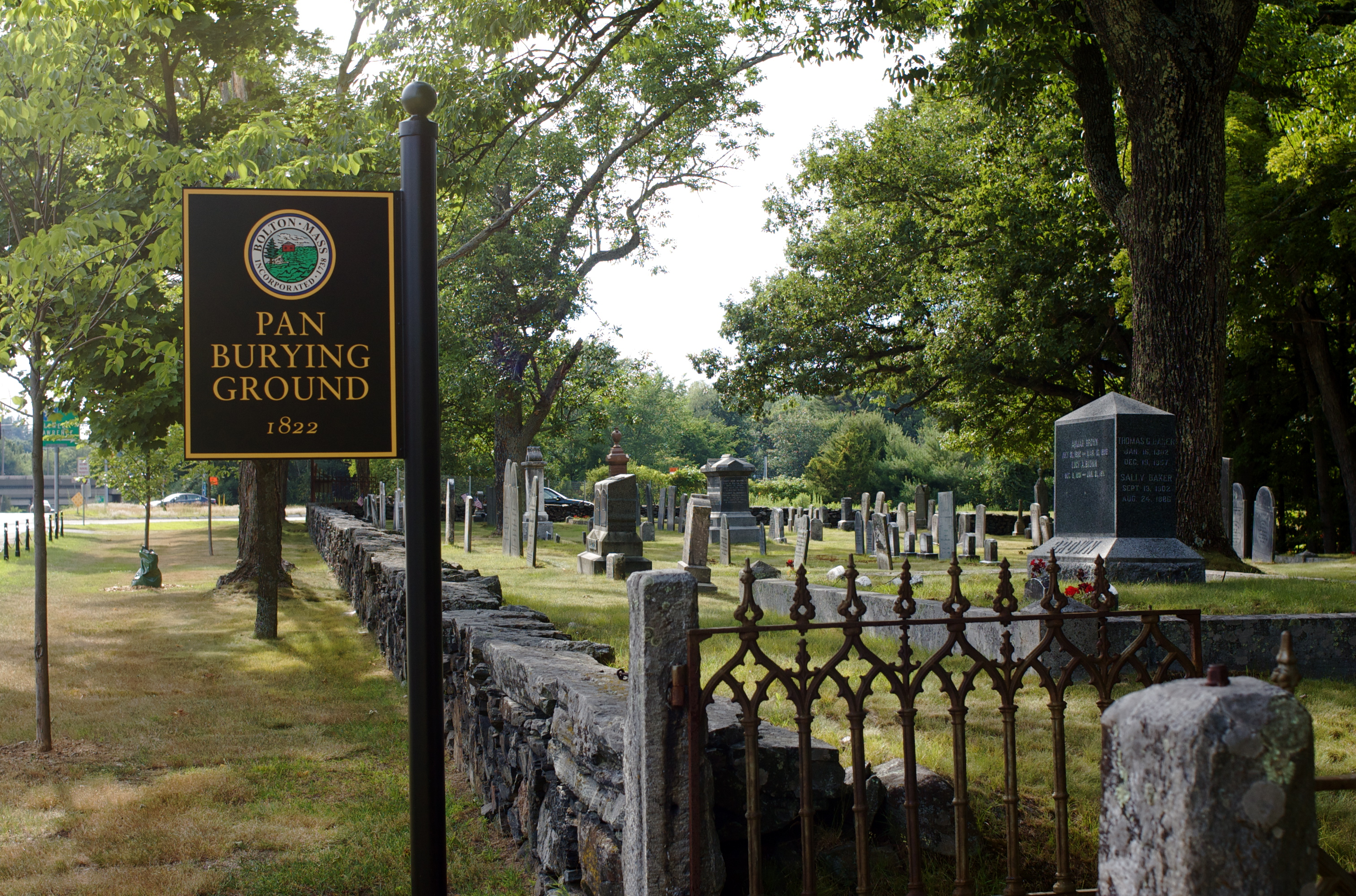
- Pan Burying Ground

- Location within Massachusetts Location within the United States
- Location: Main St., Annie Moore, Burnham, Hudson & Long Hill Rds., Bolton, Massachusetts
- Coordinates: 42°25′45″N 71°34′33″W
- Area: 300 acres (120 ha)
- NRHP reference No.: 100002783
- Added to NRHP: August 16, 2018

The Pan Historic District encompasses a historic rural landscape in eastern Bolton, Massachusetts. Named for its relatively flat terrain, the Pan was settled in the 18th century, with a largely agrarian settlement pattern augmented by small industries such as sawmills and a tannery. Architecturally the district has a well-preserved collection of Federal period residential architecture. Its main public feature is the Pan Burying Ground, an early cemetery located near the junction of Massachusetts Routes 117 and 85. It extends south from there along Route 85 and Long Hill Road, and north along Burnham Road.

The district was listed on the National Register of Historic Places in 2018.

== See also ==
- National Register of Historic Places listings in Worcester County, Massachusetts
