= Bolton Center Historic District =

Historic district in Massachusetts, United States

- U.S. National Register of Historic Places
- U.S. Historic district
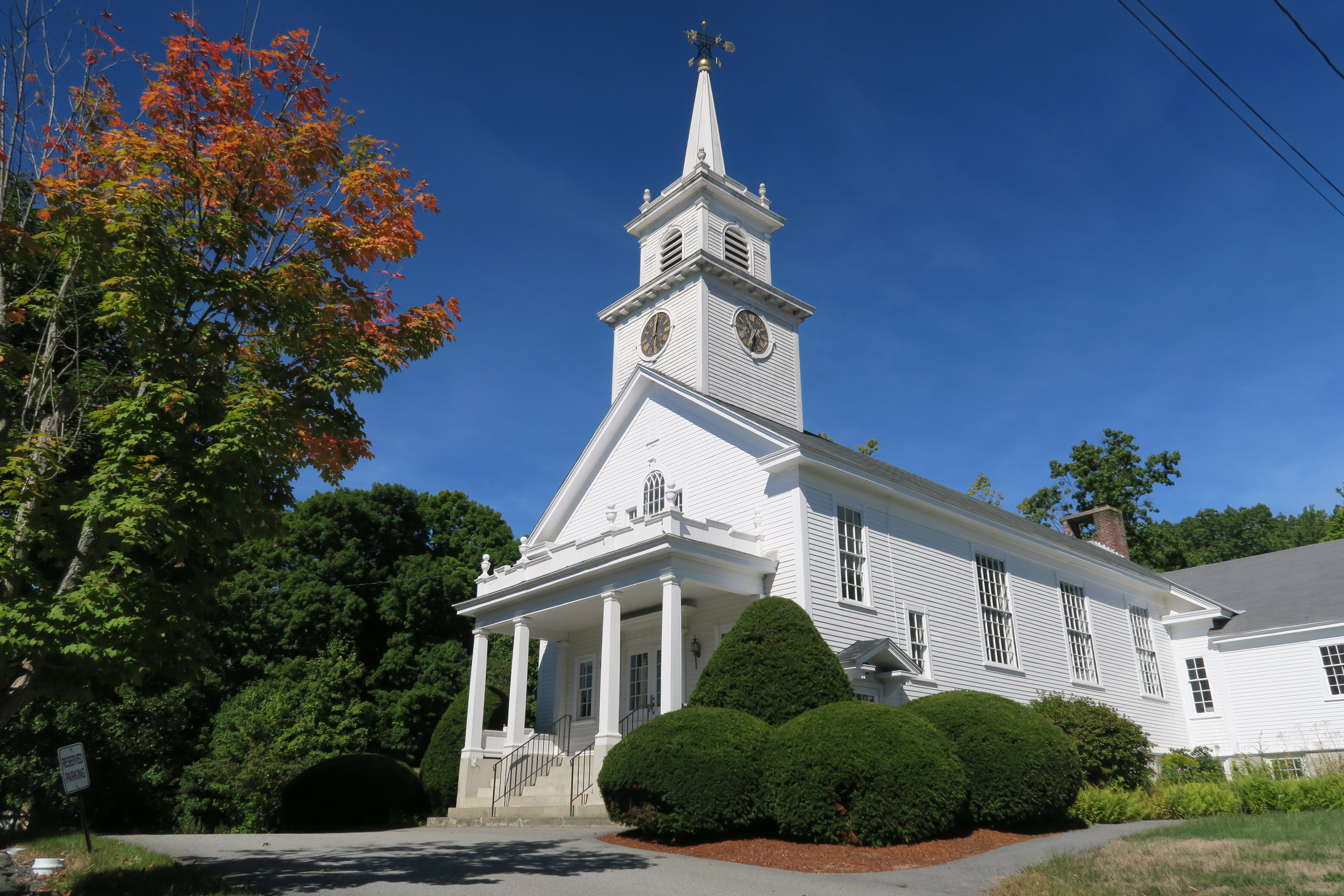
- First Parish of Bolton

- Location within Massachusetts Location within the United States
- Location: Main St., Bolton, Massachusetts
- Coordinates: 42°26′00″N 71°36′24″W
- Area: 73 acres (30 ha)
- Built: 1738
- NRHP reference No.: 97001296
- Added to NRHP: November 17, 1997

The Bolton Center Historic District is the historic center of the town of Bolton, Massachusetts. The district encompasses what is essentially a linear town center, strung out principally along Main Street (Massachusetts Route 117), with a well-preserved collection of residential and civic architecture spanning more than two centuries. The district was listed on the National Register of Historic Places in 1996.

== Description and history ==
Although the town's first meetinghouse (built c. 1740 and no longer extant) lay outside the current center, by the early 19th century the town's focus had moved to the main east–west road through the town (now Route 117), where it developed as a major stagecoach stop, with several inns and taverns serving travelers and local business. By 1830, the center had achieved much of its present appearance, with most of the later development either replacing older buildings or infilling between others.

The district includes a variety of houses from the 18th century onward, including the house of the first town minister (c. 1741, 752 Main Street). Institutional buildings in the district include the 1853 Town House, 1812 Powder House, four historic school buildings (including an 1825 one room schoolhouse), and the 1928 Colonial Revival Federated Church of Bolton. Architecturally distinguished buildings include the Tudor Revival library, built in 1903 as a gift from the Whitney family, and the 1923 Elementary School, a fine example of Colonial Revival architecture.

Goss Holman House (1741) at 752 Main Street, home of first minister

Old Brick Store, built in 1820

Bolton Powder House built during the War of 1812

Town Hall built in 1853

The Center School House 1 built in 1825

== See also ==
- National Register of Historic Places listings in Worcester County, Massachusetts
