= Bolton Flats Wildlife Management Area =

Protected area in Massachusetts

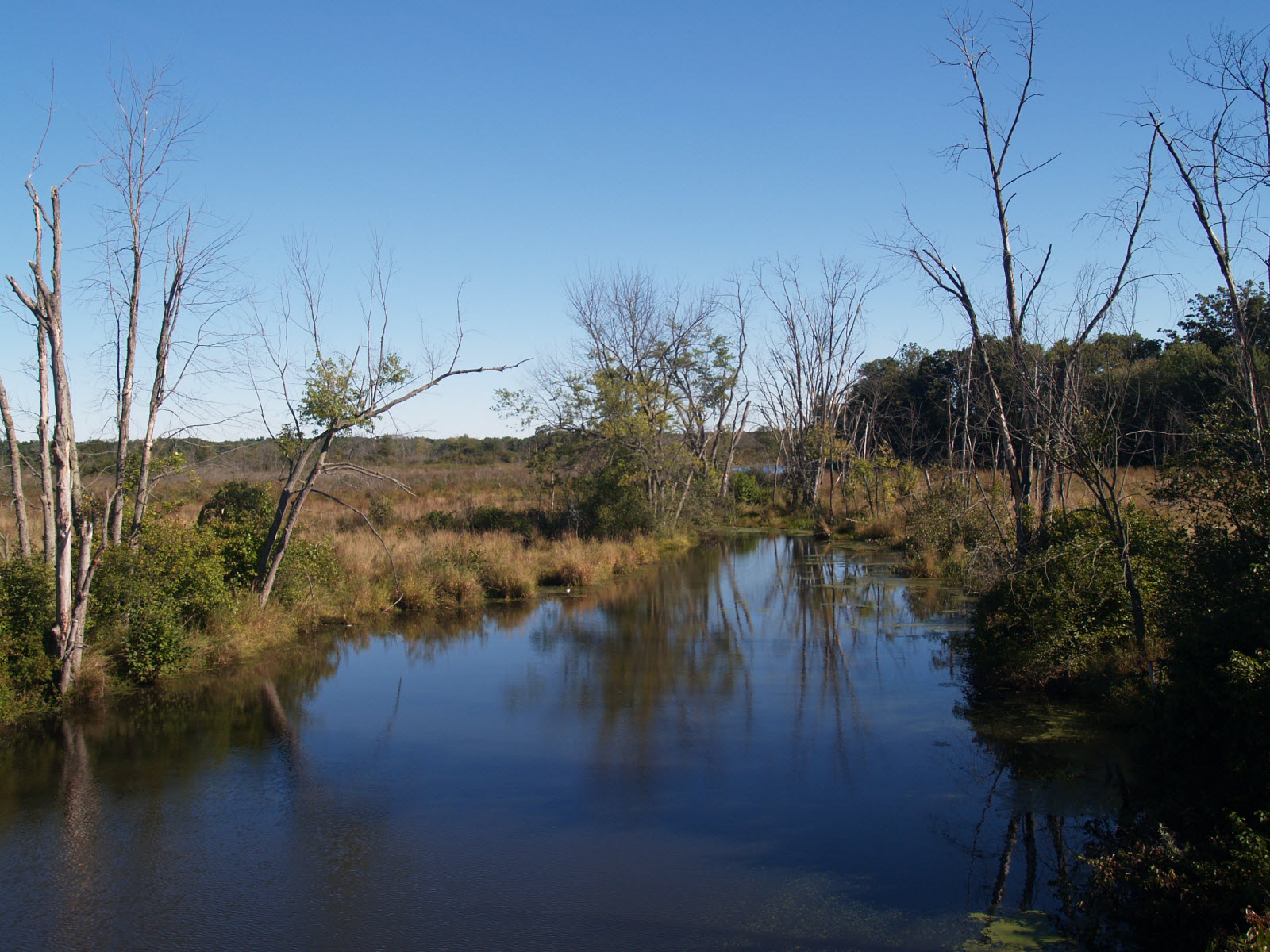
- Nashua River at Bolton Flats

- Location within Massachusetts Location within the United States
- Location: Worcester County
- Nearest city: Leominster, MA
- Coordinates: 42°28′8.9″N 71°37′46.1″W
- Area: 455 acres (184 ha)
- Owner: Division of Fisheries and Wildlife

Bolton Flats Wildlife Management Area is a 455-acre wildlife management area surrounding the Nashua River and Still River in Massachusetts. The Bolton Flats Wildlife Management Area is located in the towns of Bolton, Lancaster and Harvard, and Route 117 crosses through the area. Bolton Flats is a flood plain that was originally named "Intervale" because it is located in a valley between several hills. Birding, canoeing, fishing, hiking and hunting are popular in the area. Various turtles, including the endangered blanding turtle, and rare nesting birds are found in the habitat, and downstream from Bolton Flats is the Oxbow National Wildlife Refuge and Fort Devens Military Reservation.

According to Massachusetts Department of Conservation and Recreation, "[t]he flat lowland between the Nashua River and the Still River is called Bolton Flats and is the result of the receded glacial Lake Nashua. The area is protected by the Commonwealth as the Bolton Flats Wildlife Management Area, which is in Harvard, Bolton and Lancaster. At the Bolton entrance to the Bolton Flats Management Area there is a modest early 20th century cape with a gambrel roof barn, owned by the state." The Still River area contains various Native American objects and was the site of brickmaking from colonial times into the nineteenth century. Several nearby brick houses, including the Haynes House (ca. 1820) at 304 Still River Road, were likely constructed using bricks from the Haynes Brickyard on the Still River.

== Image Gallery ==
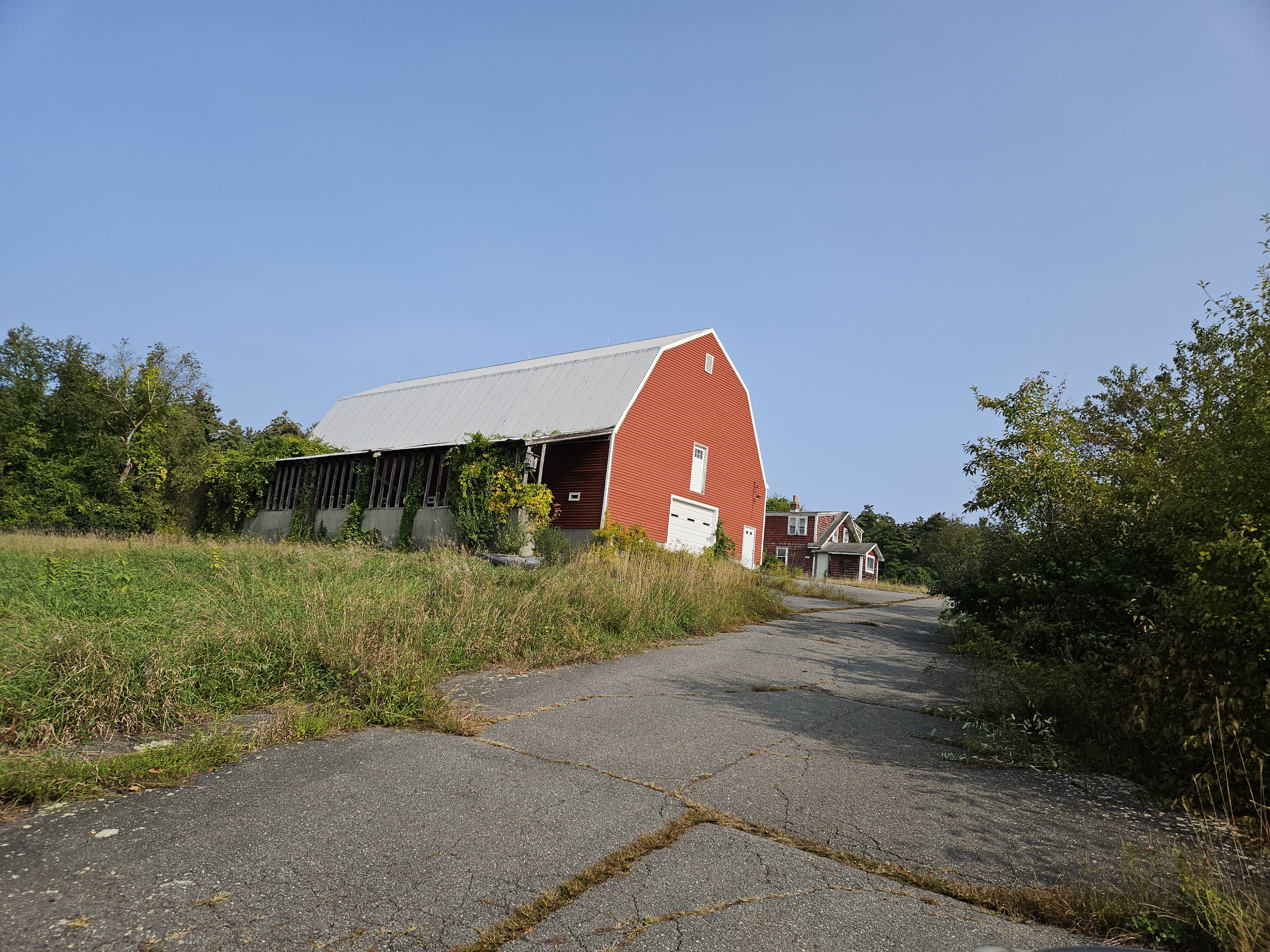
Bolton entrance to the Bolton Flats Management Area with cape and gambrel roof barn

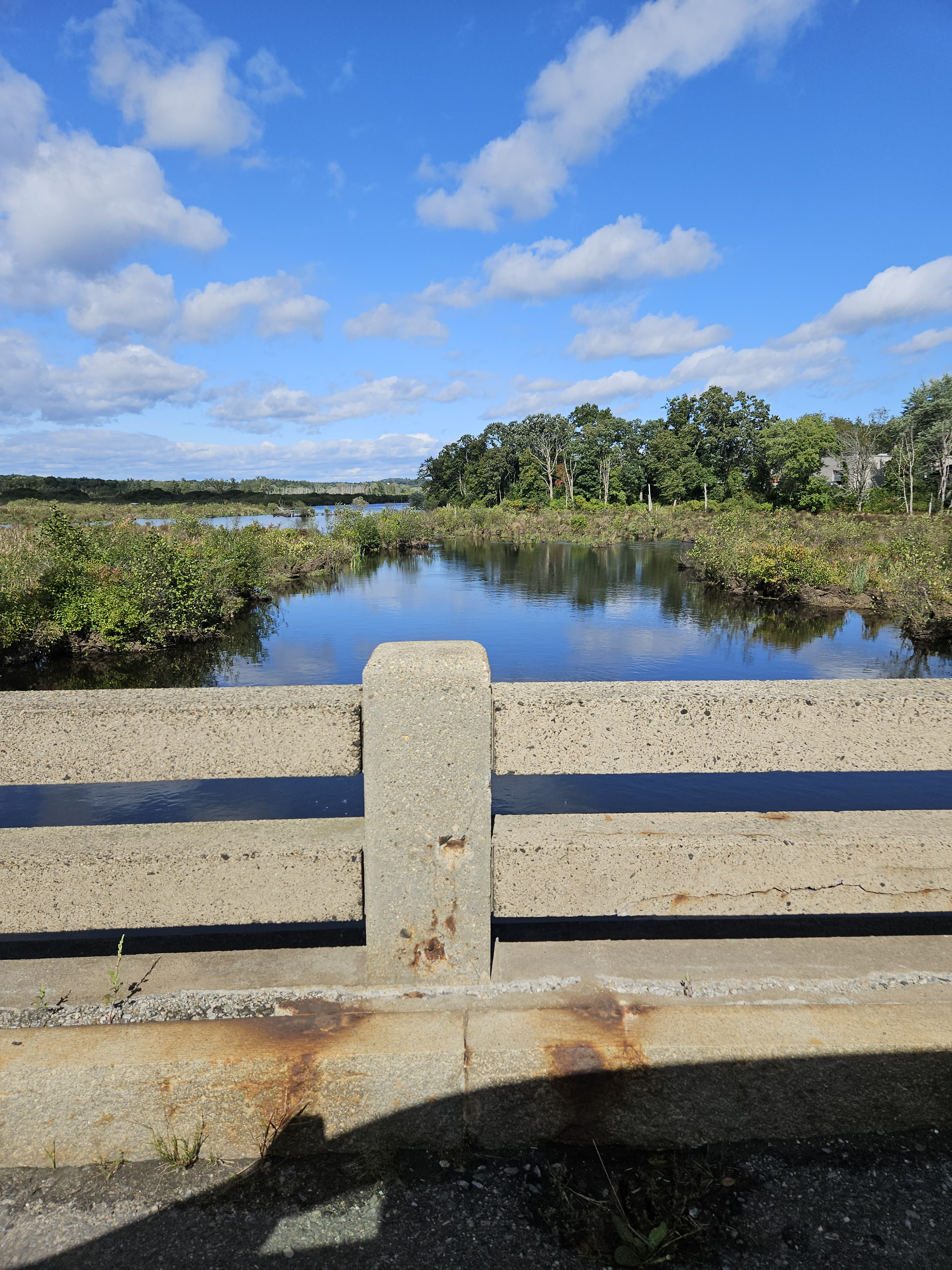
Still River and BFWMA in Bolton as seen looking north from bridge on Route 117 near Lancaster border
