= Bolton, Massachusetts =

- Town
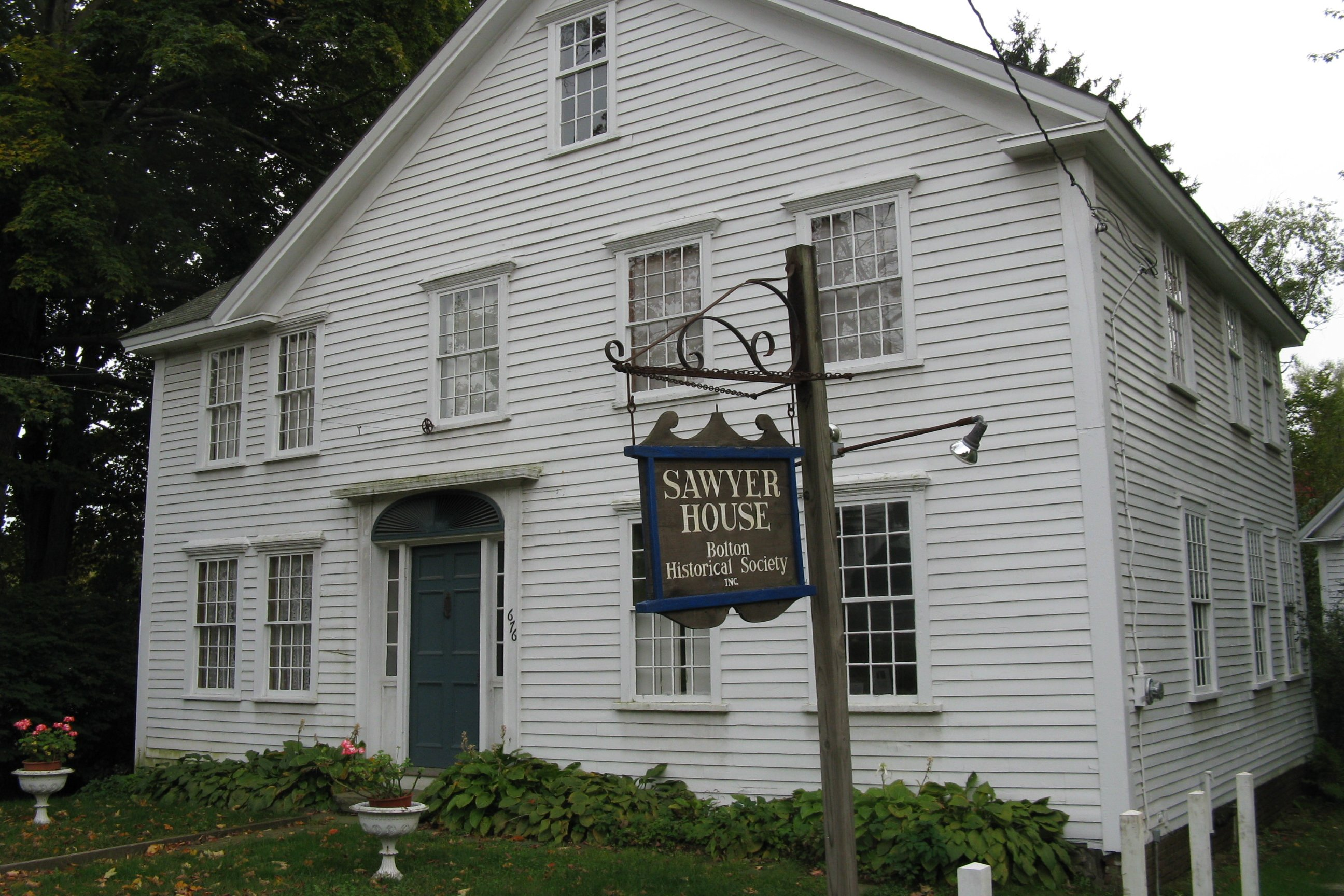
- Sawyer House, Bolton Historical Society

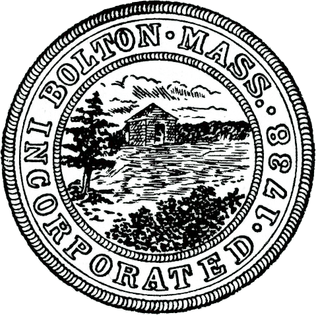
- Flag Seal

- Location in Worcester County and the state of Massachusetts.
- Coordinates: 42°26′00″N 71°36′30″W
- Country: United States
- State: Massachusetts
- County: Worcester
- Settled: 1682
- Incorporated: 1738

Government
  - Type: Open town meeting
  - Town Administrator: Marie Sobalvarro
  - Board of Selectmen: Stanley Wysocki; Jonathan Keep; Robert Czekanski

Area
  - Total: 20.0 sq mi (51.8 km^{2})
  - Land: 19.9 sq mi (51.6 km^{2})
  - Water: 0.077 sq mi (0.2 km^{2})
- Elevation: 387 ft (118 m)

Population (2020)
  - Total: 5,665
  - Density: 284/sq mi (110/km^{2})
- Time zone: UTC-5 (Eastern)
  - Summer (DST): UTC-4 (Eastern)
- ZIP code: 01740
- Area code: 351 / 978
- FIPS code: 25-06365
- GNIS feature ID: 0618357
- Website: www.townofbolton.com

Bolton is a town in Worcester County, Massachusetts, United States. Bolton is in central Massachusetts, located 25 miles west-northwest of downtown Boston along Interstate 495. It is within Greater Boston and MetroWest regions. The population was 5,665 at the 2020 census.

Settled in the 1600s and incorporated in 1738, the town is still home to many farms and apple orchards, along with the well-known Nashoba Valley Winery and The International Golf Club, which has hosted several major tournaments. The Bolton Flats Wildlife Management Area is largely located in the town near the Nashua River and Still River as well as many other parks and conservation areas.

== History ==
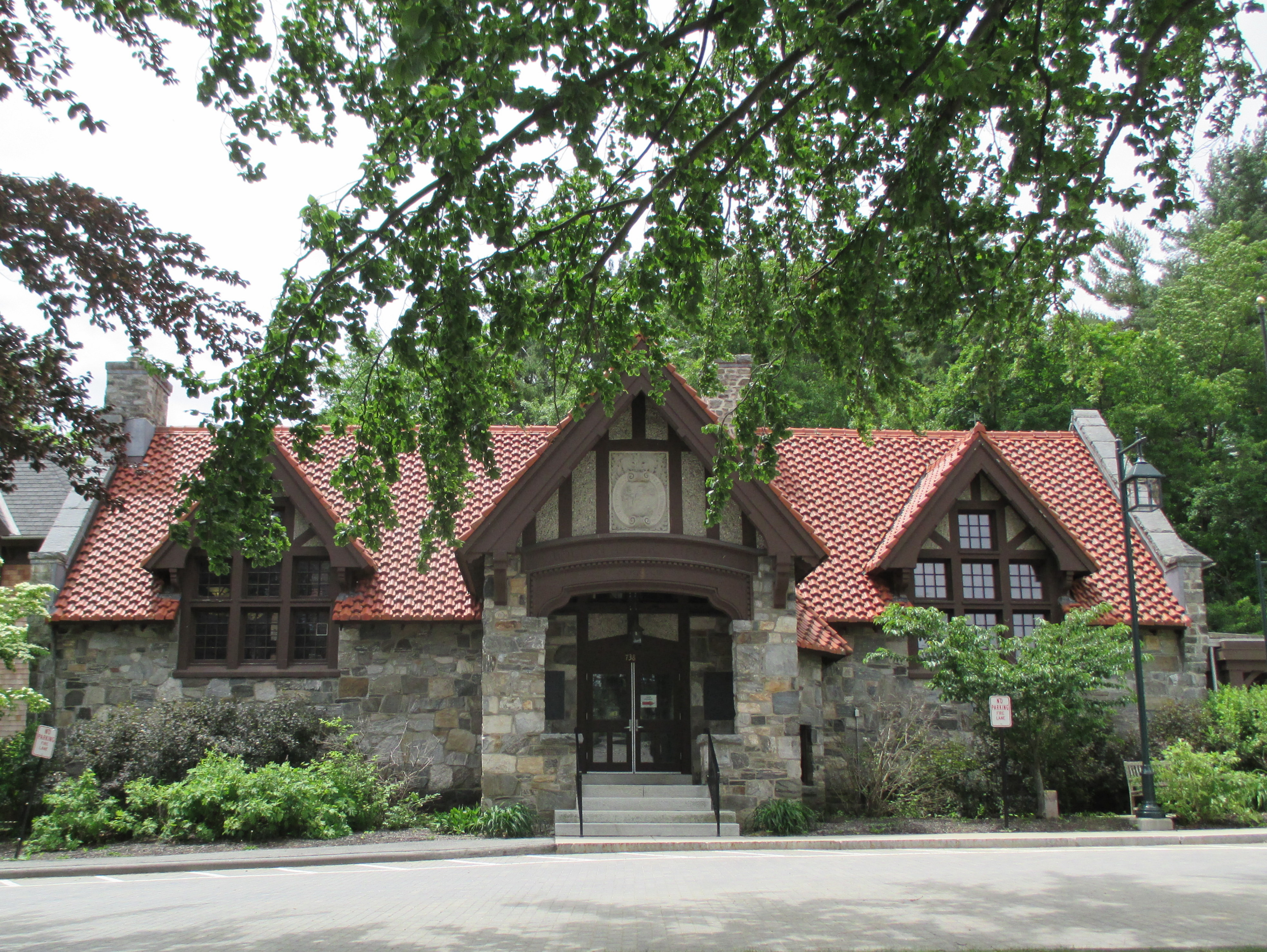
Bolton Public Library, built in 1904 in a Tudor Revival style

Prior to its incorporation, the area was settled by English farmers in the 1600s near where the Nashaway tribe fished and farmed along the Nashua River. In 1643 Thomas King of Watertown had purchased the land from the sachem Sholan of the Nashaway as the southeastern corner of the Nashaway (Lancaster) purchase. The land in what is now Bolton was formerly part of the town of Lancaster until Bolton seceded along the Still River, where the current boundary line still stands. The town of Bolton was incorporated on June 24, 1738, following an influx of settlers and was named after the Duke of Bolton.

In 1656 the Concord highway was laid out over Wattaquadock Hill in Bolton. By 1711 more than 150 people were living on Bolton soil, despite a local history of Indian uprisings and one massacre during King Philip's War. Many early houses were protected by flankers, and were designated as garrisons. After the War various small industries developed in Bolton including the mining of limestone at Bolton Lime Kiln and Quarry.

During the American Revolution Bolton farmers erected a liberty pole at the town center and largely supported the revolutionary cause. General John Whitcomb of Bolton was elected the first Major-General of the Massachusetts Army at the third Provincial Congress in 1775. He was a minuteman leader at the Battles of Lexington and Concord and the Battle of Bunker Hill. By the Civil War in the 1860s Bolton residents had formed an abolitionist society, and twenty-one Bolton residents died fighting for the Union. The Bolton Fair was founded in Bolton in 1874 as an agricultural fair, but the fair was later moved to nearby Lancaster in 2004 where it is still held annually.

In the 1920s Bolton was used as a setting and mentioned a number of times in H.P. Lovecraft's fiction: as a setting in his Herbert West—Reanimator, and also mentioned in his The Rats in the Walls and The Colour out of Space. However, H.P. Lovecraft's Bolton was located on the North Shore near Ipswich, Massachusetts, and was described as a factory town bearing little resemblance to the actual town.

== Geography ==
According to the United States Census Bureau, the town has a total area of 20.0 square miles (52 km^{2}), of which 19.9 square miles (52 km^{2}) is land and 0.1 square miles (0.26 km^{2}), or 0.35%, is water. Wattaquadock Hill and Vaughn Hill's North Peak are the highest points in Bolton.

== Demographics ==
Historical population
Year	Pop.	±%
1790	861	—
1850	1,263	+46.7%
1860	1,348	+6.7%
1870	1,014	−24.8%
1880	903	−10.9%
1890	827	−8.4%
1900	770	−6.9%
1910	764	−0.8%
1920	708	−7.3%
1930	764	+7.9%
1940	775	+1.4%
1950	956	+23.4%
1960	1,264	+32.2%
1970	1,905	+50.7%
1980	2,530	+32.8%
1990	3,134	+23.9%
2000	4,148	+32.4%
2010	4,897	+18.1%
2020	5,665	+15.7%
2025*	6,477	+14.3%
* = population estimate. Source: United States census records and Population Estimates Program data.

As of the census of 2010, there were 4,897 people, 1,670 households, and 1,391 families residing in the town. The population density was 246.1 inhabitants per square mile (95.0/km^{2}). There were 1,738 housing units at an average density of 87.3 per square mile (33.7/km^{2}). The racial makeup of the town was 94.9% White, 0.5% African American, 0.1% Native American, 2.7% Asian, 0.02% Pacific Islander, 0.2% from other races, and 1.6% from two or more races. Hispanic or Latino of any race were 1.8% of the population.

There were 1,670 households, out of which 43.7% had children under the age of 18 living with them, 74.3% were married couples living together, 2.8% had a male householder with no husband present, 6.2% had a female householder with no husband present, and 16.7% were non-families. The householders of 12.1% of all households were living alone and the householders of 4.9% of households were living alone who was 65 years of age or older. The average household size was 2.93 and the average family size was 3.22.

In the town, the population was spread out, with 31.2% of the population 19 and under, 3.4% from 20 to 24, 19.7% from 25 to 44, 36.3% from 45 to 64, and 9.4% who were 65 years of age or older. The median age was 38 years. For every 100 females, there were 100.8 males. For every 100 females age 18 and over, there were 96.1 males.

As of 2015, the median income for a household in the town was $147,446, and the median income for a family was $155,063. Males had a median income of $101,042 versus $71,905 for females. The per capita income for the town was $51,791. About 1.3% of families and 1.8% of the population were below the poverty line, including 1.6% of those under age 18 and 2.0% of those age 65 or over.

== Arts and culture ==
=== National Historic Places ===
- Bolton Center Historic District, includes historic civic, religious and commercial buildings along Route 117
- Pan Burying Ground, est. 1822 contains a notable seven-chambered group tomb
- Pan Historic District, includes a large collection of rural Federal style and colonial architecture
- Whitcomb Inn and Farm, ca. 1708, possibly the oldest surviving house in Bolton

== Government ==
State government
State Representative(s):	Kate Hogan (D)
State Senator(s):	Robyn Kennedy (D)
Governor's Councilor(s):	Jen Caissie (R)
Federal government
U.S. Representative(s):	Lori Trahan (D) (3rd District),
U.S. Senators:	Elizabeth Warren (D), Ed Markey (D)

== Education ==
Bolton is a member of the Nashoba Regional School District, also serving the towns of Lancaster and Stow. Bolton is home to Florence Sawyer School (Pre-K–8) and Nashoba Regional High School.

== Notable people ==
- Suzy Becker (born 1962), is an author, illustrator, entrepreneur, educator, and social activist
- Harold Brown Jr. (1972 - 2009), was a CIA Officer and U.S. Army Reserve Major who was killed during the Camp Chapman attack
- William C. Edes (1856–1922), was a U.S. civil engineer who was the chairman for Alaskan Engineering Commission
- Bill Ezinicki (1924–2012), NHL hockey player, professional golfer, won three Stanley Cups with the Toronto Maple Leafs, inducted into PGA tour hall of fame New England Section in 1997
- Heather K. Gerken (born 1969), is the Dean and Sol & Lillian Goldman Professor of Law at Yale Law School
- Hal Gill (born 1975), former NHL player
- William Ellery Leonard (1876–1944), poet and author, professor at the University of Wisconsin's Dept. of English
- J. Sterling Livingston (1916–2010), was an American entrepreneur, management consultant, and professor at the Harvard Business School
- Frank L. McNamara Jr. (born 1947), is an American attorney who served as the United States Attorney for the District of Massachusetts
- Amos Nourse (1794–1877), United States Senator from Maine
- Karen O'Connor (born 1958), is an American equestrian who competes in three-day eventing
- Philip J. Philbin (1898–1972), member of the United States House of Representatives from Massachusetts's 3rd congressional district from 1943 to 1971
- Philip Phillips (1900-1994), Harvard archaeologist
- Wilbert Robinson (1864–1934), Baseball Hall of Fame manager nicknamed "Uncle Robbie", managed the Brooklyn Dodgers for 17 years
- Frederick A. Sawyer (1822–1891), United States Senator from South Carolina
- Samuel Stearns (1741–1809), astronomer and author
- William C. Sullivan (1912–1977), was a Federal Bureau of Investigation official
- John Whitcomb (1713–1785), state representative and American Revolutionary War general
- Nathan Wilson (1758–1834), was a United States representative from New York
