= Wattaquadock Hill =

Hill in Bolton, Massachusetts, US

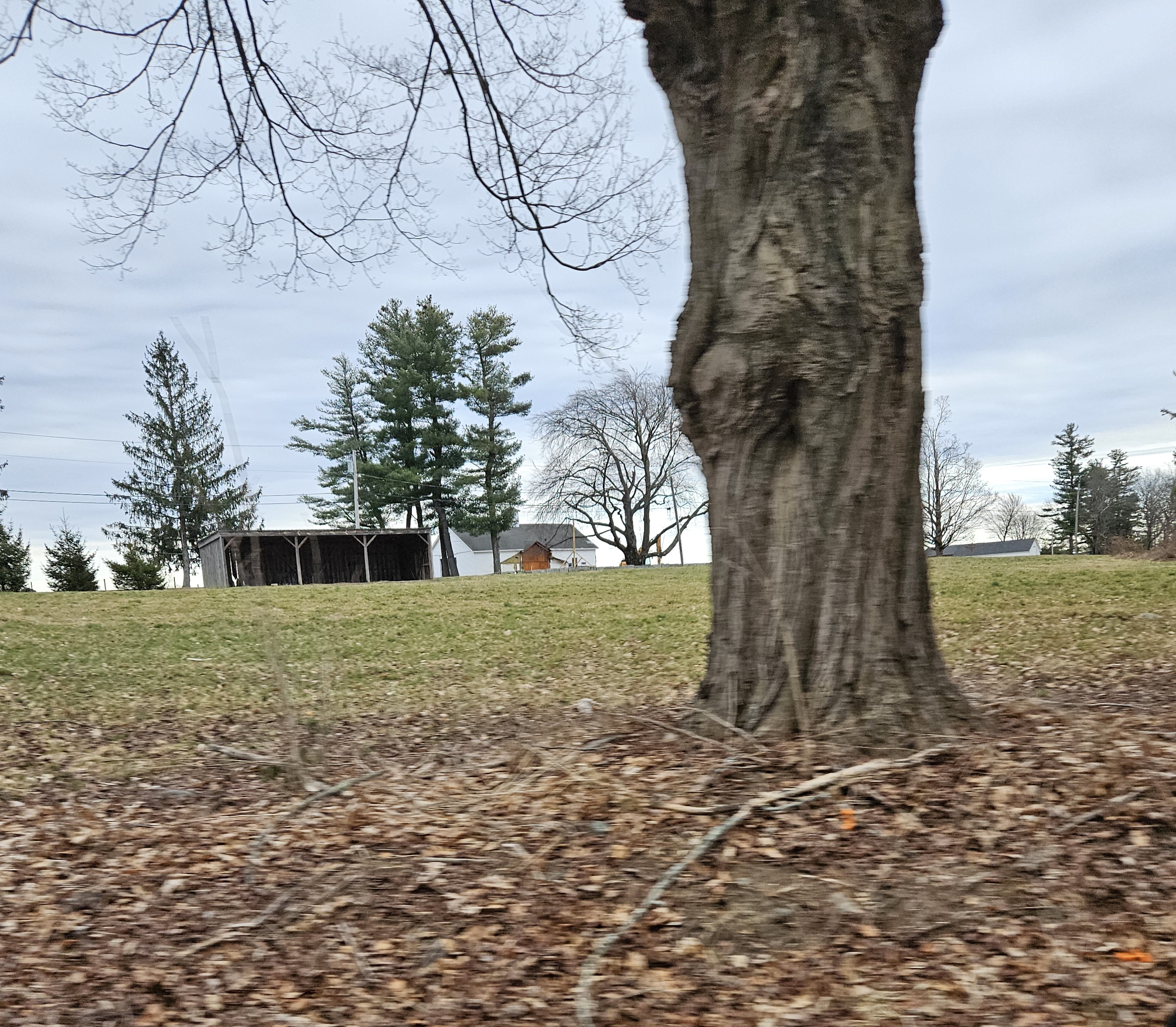
- farm near summit

Highest point
- Elevation: 640 ft (200 m)
- Coordinates: 42°26′15″N 71°37′43″W

Geography
- Location: Worcester County, Massachusetts
- Topo map: USGS

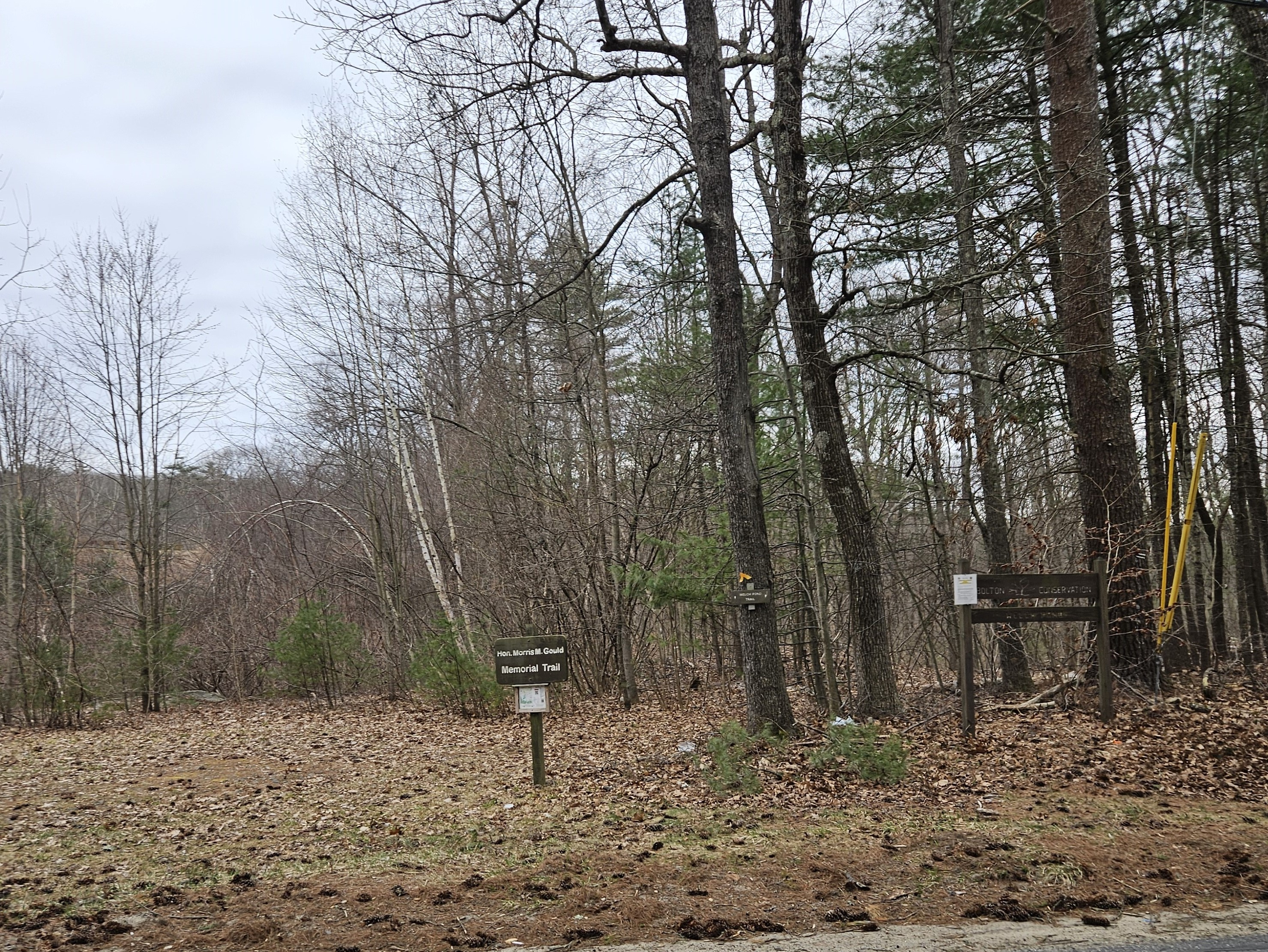
Welch Pond Conservation Land Trailhead on Wattaquodock Hill Road

Wattaquadock Hill (also known as Wataquadock or Wataquodoc) is a 640-foot (200 m) hill and ridge in southwest Bolton, Massachusetts and the site of a 15-acre (6.1 ha) wooded conservation area containing hiking trails and wetlands. It is the highest point in Bolton.

== Description ==
Wattaquadock Hill is the highest peak between Boston and Mount Wachusett and the highest in Bolton, followed closely by Vaughn Hill. On the hill are many hiking trails near pine forests, streams, a large pond with a beaver dam, and a kettle hole bog. The hill may be accessed via the Welch Pond Trail Head on Wattaquadock Hill Road and there are 15 acres of public conservation land. The actual summit is located on private land, but on the conservation land is the foundation of an observation tower with a USGS summit marker embedded in it. There is a church, winery, and restaurant located on nearby Wattaqudock Hill Road.

== Name origin ==
The word "Wattaquadock" is an Indian word possibly meaning the "place of many springs" and is also used for nearby Wattaquadock Road and Wattaquadock Brook, now known as Mill Brook, which probably took its name from the hill. According to one source, "it may be a corruption of the word Wuttuhqohteuk, Wuttuhq, 'Branches of trees' or 'wood for fuel,'- ohteuk, 'field or land which is cultivated,' signifying a tract of open land over which fallen trees were scattered, 'a wood-land."' One nineteenth century history describes the diversity of spelling and pronunciation of the hill:

The meaning, descriptive of the Bolton range of hills, hidden in the Indian word Wataquadock, has not been found, though long sought. Of local names about Lancaster none has experienced more varied spelling at the hands of clerks and historians. The later methods seem in no way improvements upon Ralph Houghton's first attempt to render into English syllables the word as he heard it from native lips, in 1653. In the town records we find Wataquadoke 1656 and 1659, Wataquadocke 1658, Wadaquadock 1718, all nearly the same in sound with the first above. Joseph Willard, Esquire, in 1826, preferred Wataquodoc. Reverend Peter Whitney gave us in 1792, Wattoquottock! It was not until the Indian tongue was forgotten in Lancaster, and the recorders were unusually illiterate, that such outre orthography as Waterquaduc and Wattoquoddoc crept in.

== History ==
In 1642 the Nashaway sachem Sholan requested a visit from trader Thomas King, who became the first settler to cross the Wattaquadock hills, when he used an Indian trail which became known as the Bay Path. Wattaquadock Hill was first mentioned in the Lancaster records in 1655 and has always been the name for the ridge which is the boundary of the eastern Nashaway valley. The Concord highway was laid out in 1656 and passes over the hill. During King Phillip's War in the 1670s most of the houses around current day Bolton and Lancaster were burned except for two on Wattaquadock Hill. The southwest side of Wattaquadock Hill was likely the site of Wheeler's garrison house where "Jonas and John Fairbanks and Richard Wheeler were killed." For nearly 270 years the "meadows and pastures along the ridge of Wattaquadock Hill were farmed by the Wheelers and Howes, and now the land is home to a horse farm. In 1980 the town of Bolton acquired public conservation land on the hill.
