= Bolton Lime Kiln and Quarry Conservation Area =

Historic site in Massachusetts, United States

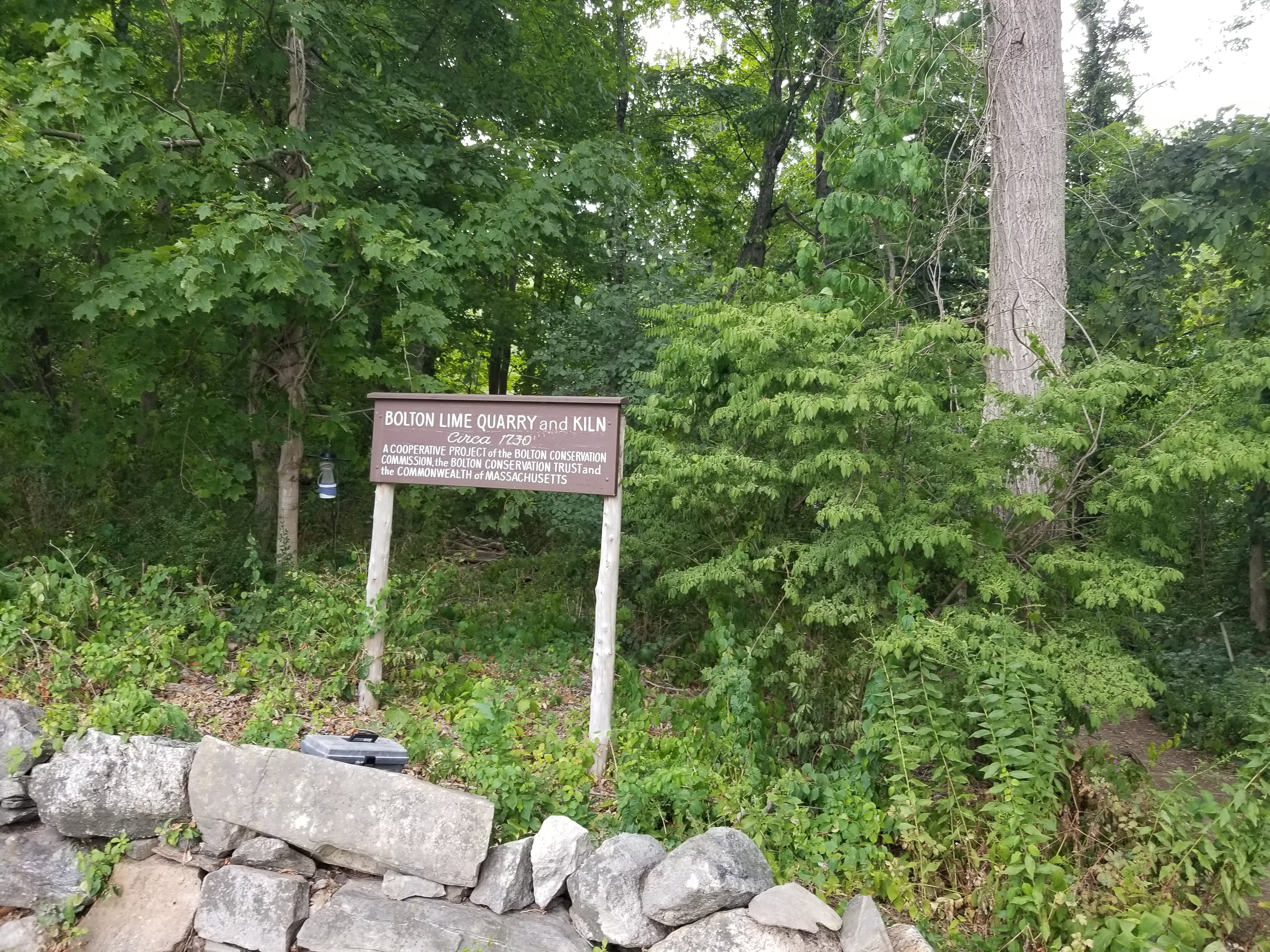
Bolton Lime Quarry and Kiln Conservation Land sign along Route 117 in Bolton Massachusetts USA

The Bolton Lime Kiln and Quarry Conservation Area in Bolton, Massachusetts, is a historic lime kiln and lime quarry site dating to around 1738 which is now part of the Rattlesnake Hill Core Conservation Area..

Around 1738 the Whitcomb family founded the kilm quarry and kiln, the second one founded in New England. The lime was used for plaster in colonial times. In the 1800s the quarry was flooded and closed when workers accidentally hit an underground water source. In 1937 a Somerville company pumped out the quarry and briefly tried to mine the uncommonly hard limestone found at the site before quickly ceasing operations. The Rattlesnake Hill Core Conservation Area that was acquired by the town of Bolton in 1976.
