= Whitcomb Inn and Farm =

- U.S. National Register of Historic Places
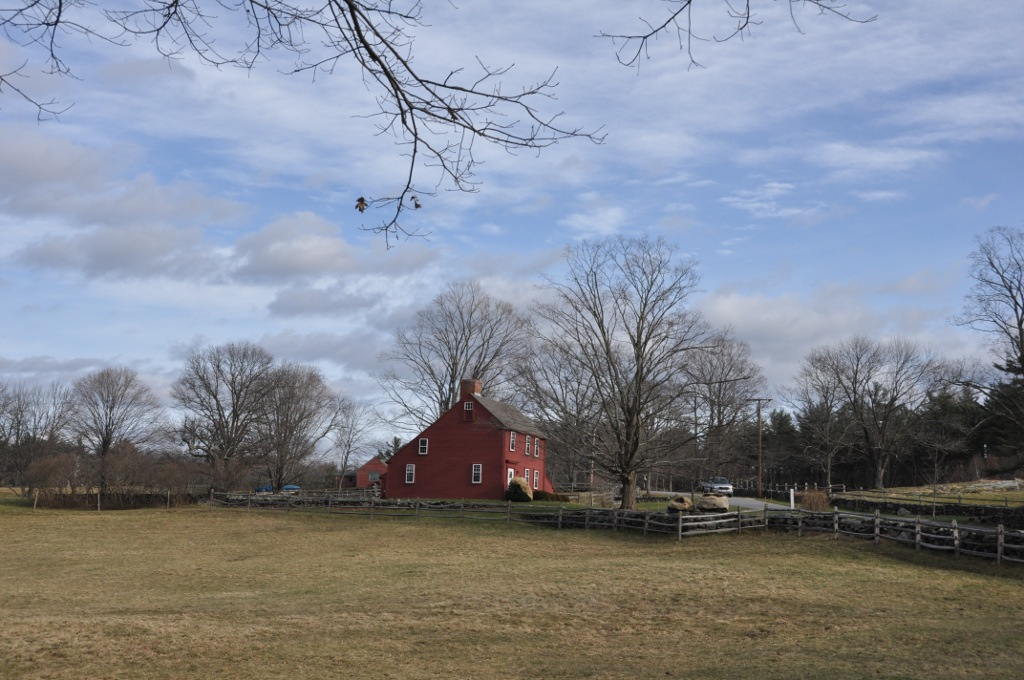

- Location within Massachusetts Location within the United States
- Location: Bolton, Massachusetts
- Coordinates: 42°26′44″N 71°34′54″W
- Area: 76.65 acres (31.02 ha)
- Built: c. 1708
- Architect: Phillips, Philip
- Architectural style: Colonial, Georgian
- NRHP reference No.: 02000431
- Added to NRHP: May 2, 2002

The Whitcomb Inn and Farm (also known as the David and Tilly Whitcomb House and Farm, and the Samuel Wheeler House and Farm) is an historic farm at 43 Old Sugar Road in Bolton, Massachusetts, United States. The oldest portion of the farmhouse, which is believed to be the oldest surviving building in Bolton, is estimated to have been built c. 1708, when David Whitcomb acquired the land from his father. The rear leanto section with a "Beverly jog" (a section of the rear addition projecting beyond the side of the original structure) was built about 10 years later, and an extension ell was added to the east of the house later in the 18th century. The building underwent stylistic changes in the 19th century, most of which were removed during a major restoration in 1937–38 by Philip Phillips.

The farm was listed on the National Register of Historic Places in 2002.

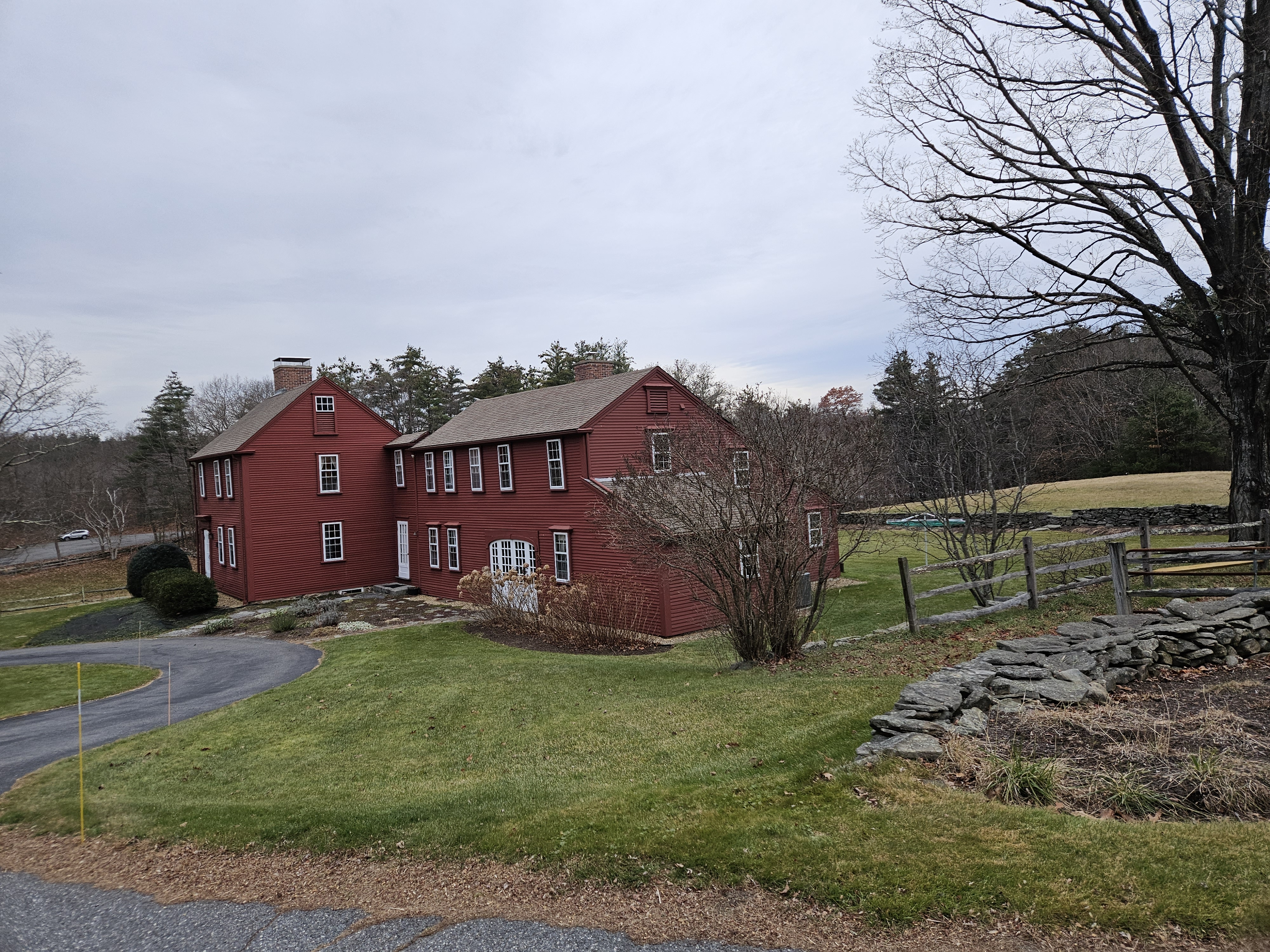
Northeast view

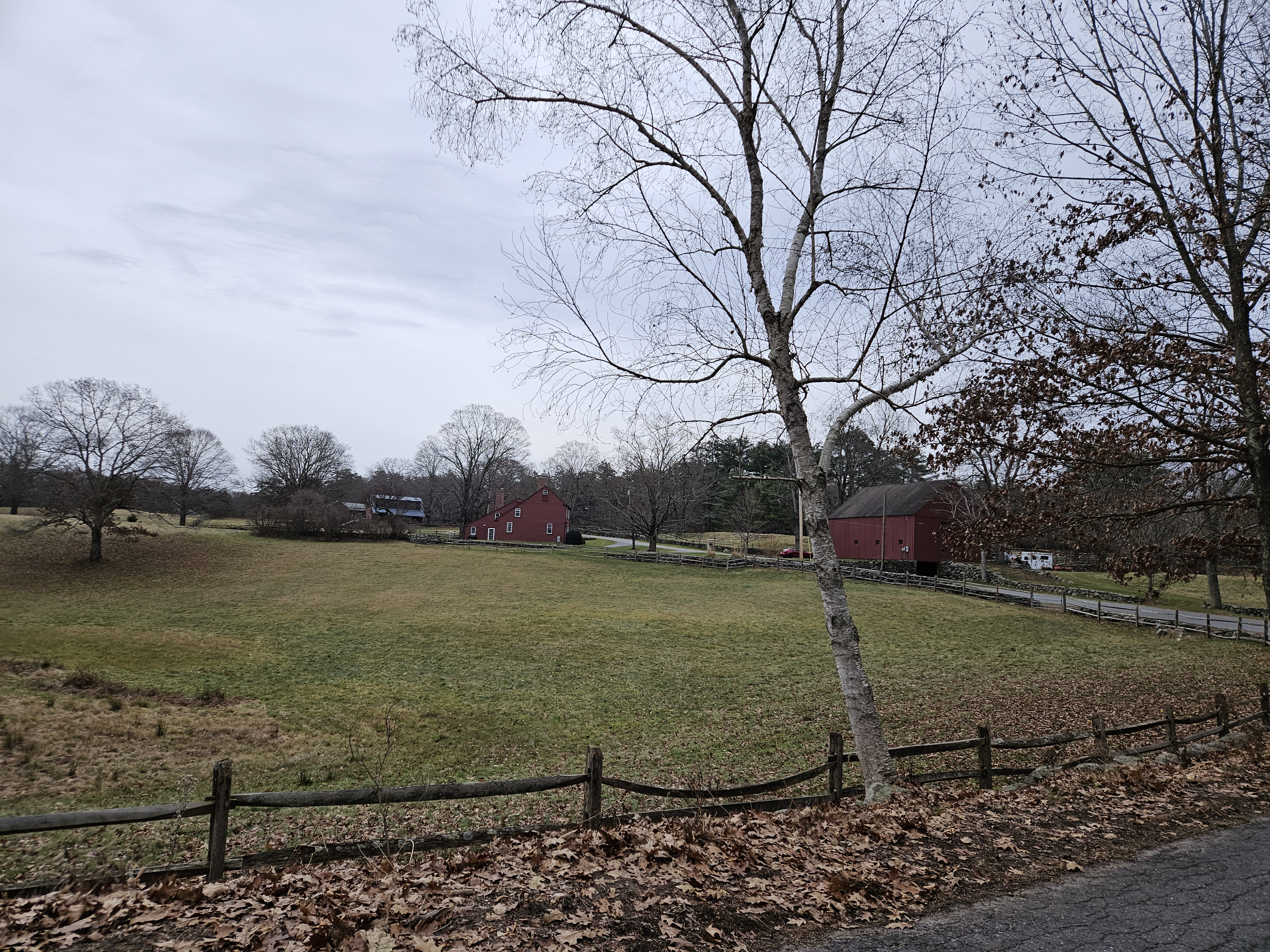

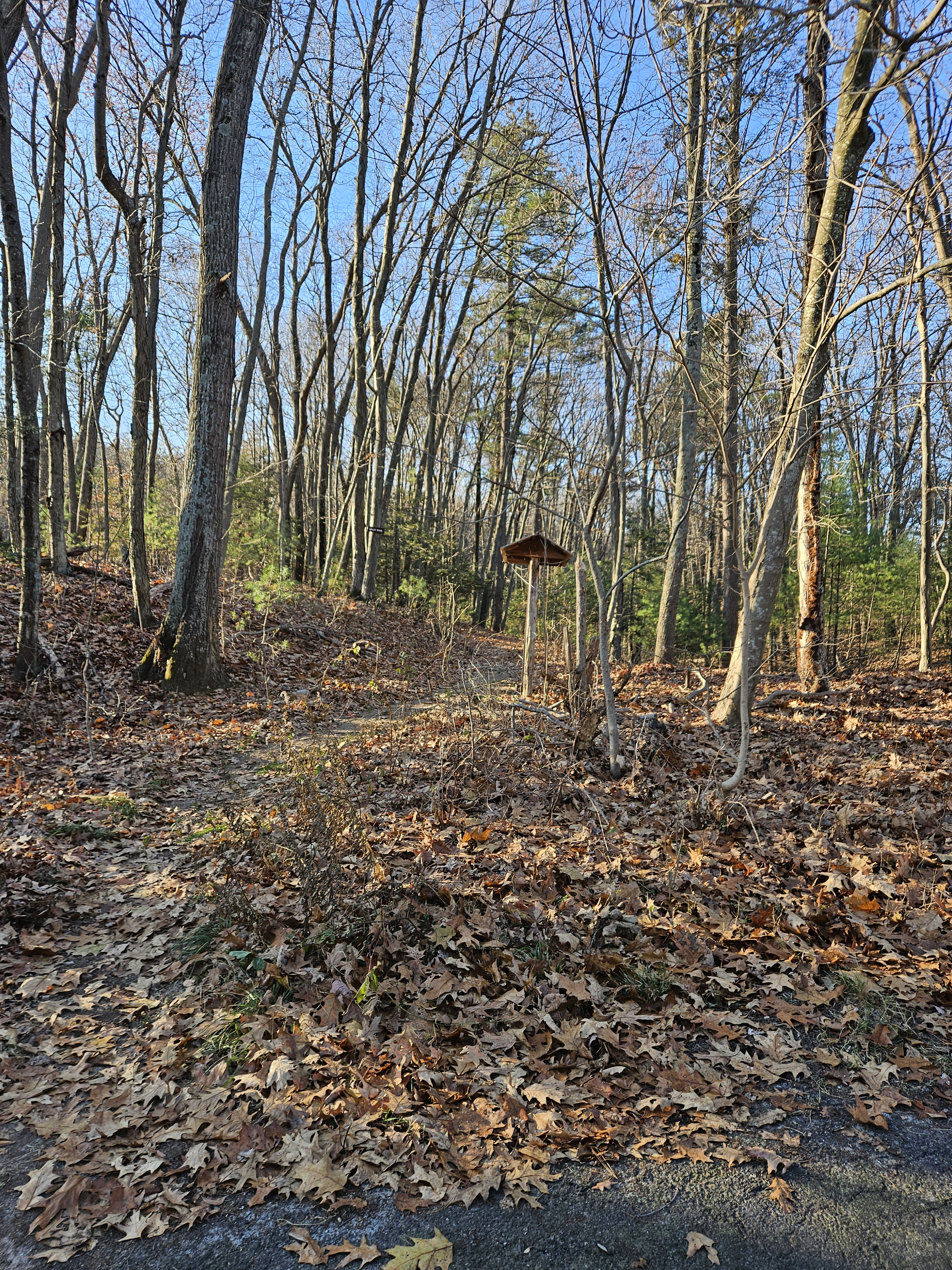
Split Rock Hiking Trail and Conservation area abutting Farm

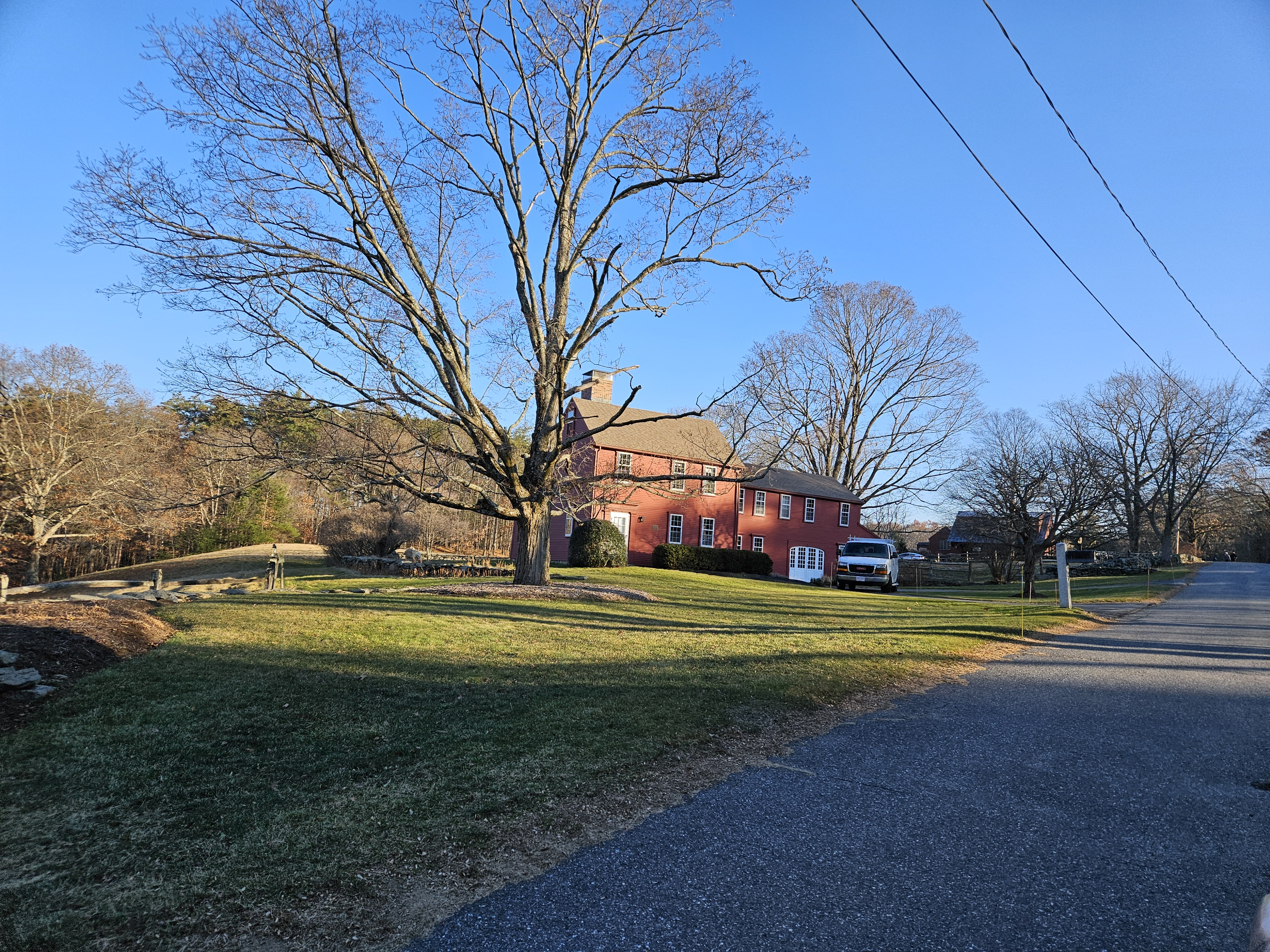
Southeast view

== See also ==
- National Register of Historic Places listings in Worcester County, Massachusetts
