= Vaughn Hill =

Hill in Bolton, Massachusetts, US

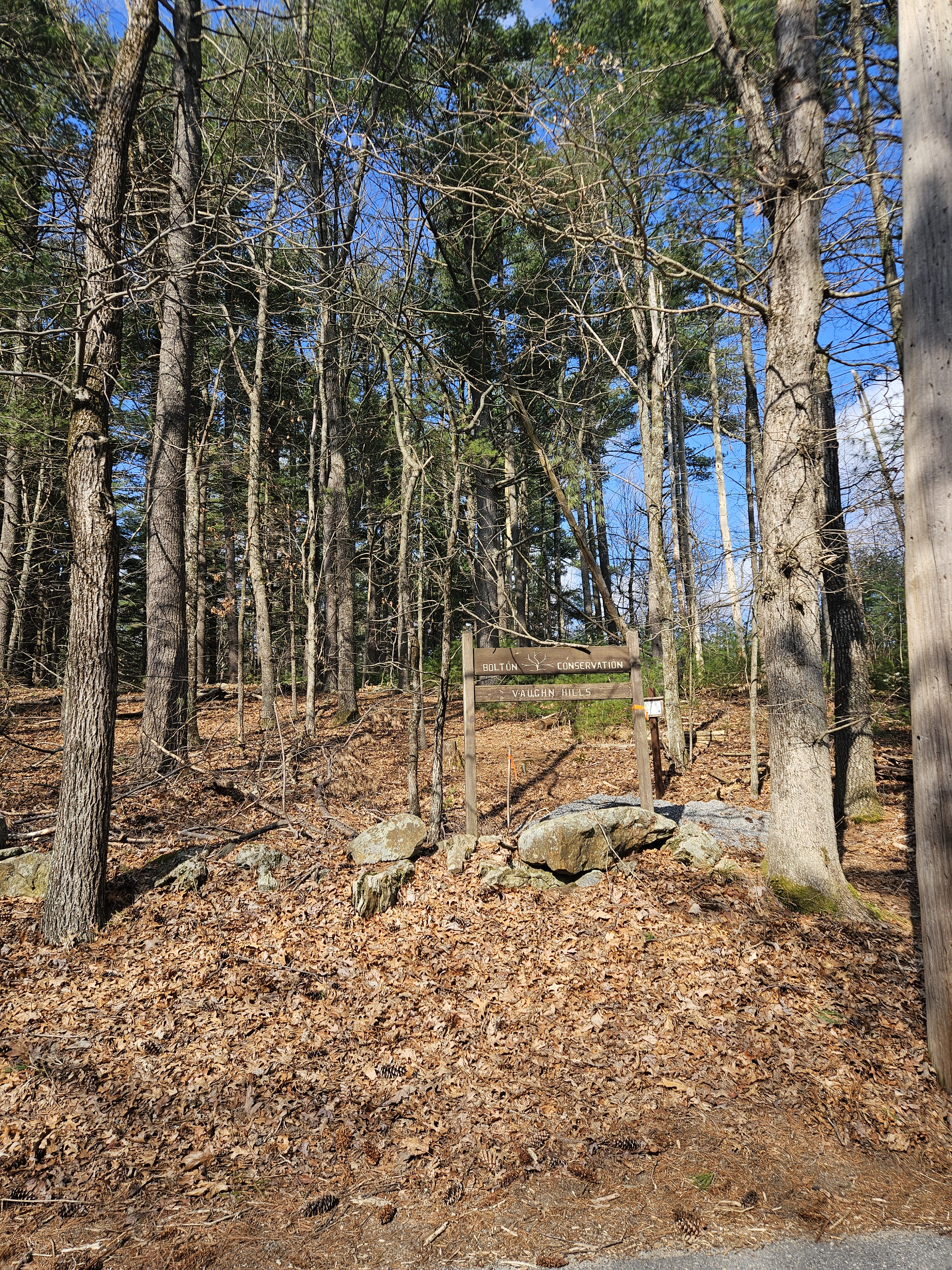
- Vaughn Hills entrance on Bare Hill Rd.

Highest point
- Elevation: 637 ft (194 m)
- Coordinates: 42°27′39″N 71°36′59″W

Geography
- Location: Worcester County, Massachusetts

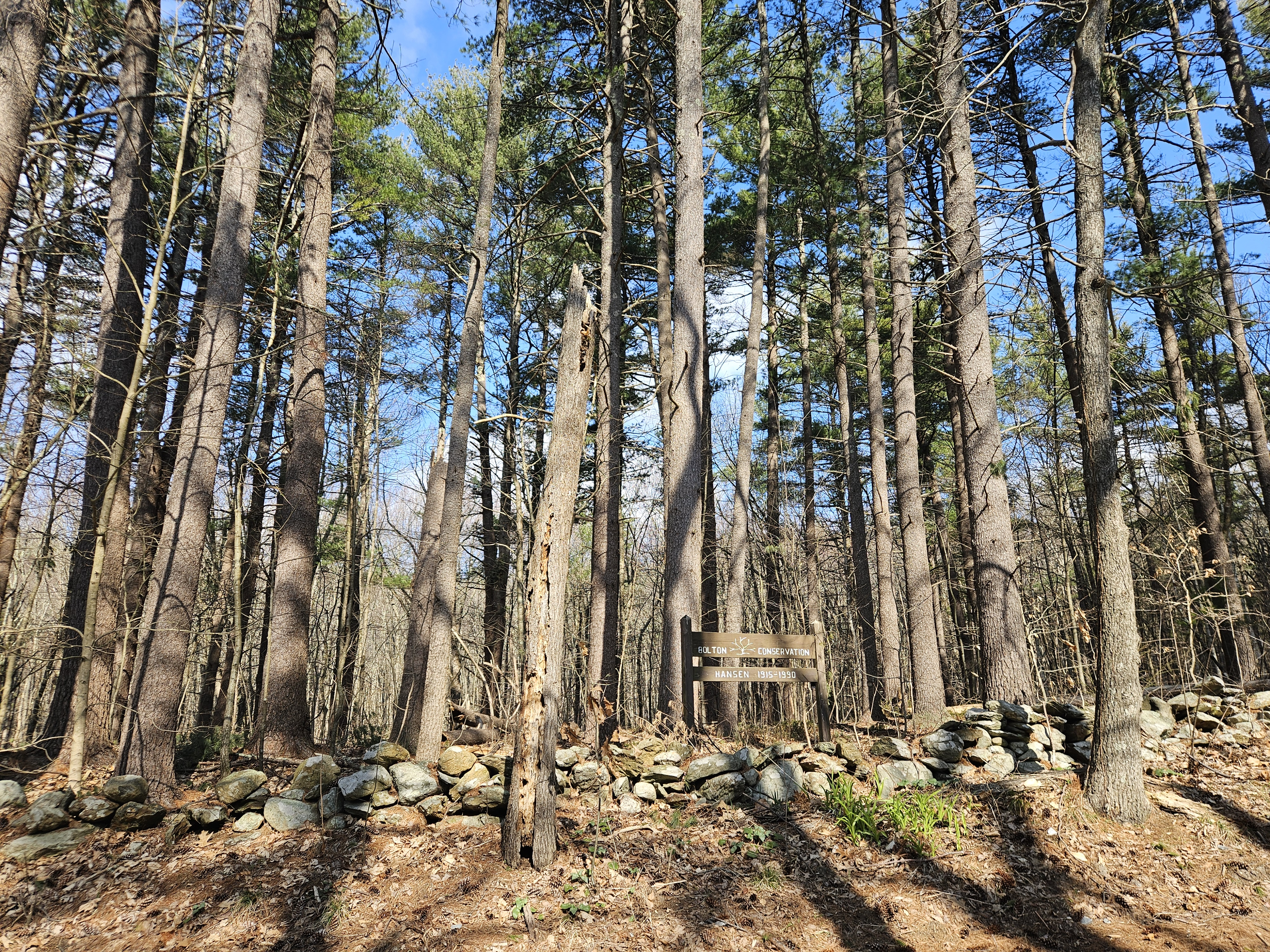
Hansen Land entrance to Vaughn Hills on Green Rd.

Vaughn Hill (also known as Vaughan Hill or the Vaughn Hills) is a 637-foot (194 m) hill in northwestern Bolton, Massachusetts, and the site of a 187-acre (76 ha) wooded conservation area containing hiking trails and wetlands near the border with Harvard, Massachusetts. It is one of the largest parcels of conservation land in the town.

== Description ==
The North Peak of the Vaughn Hills is one of the highest peaks between Boston and Mount Wachusett and the second highest in Bolton after Wattaquadock Hill. The South Peak is located on private land. There are many hiking trails near pine forests, streams, and ponds with beaver dams. There are four entrances to the conservation area, and the Woodside Drive and Vaughn Hill Road entrances have parking.

== History ==
Nineteenth century historian Henry S. Nourse "believed the name to be of Indian origin" because the hill "was first known to early settlers as Van's or Vahan's hill, and as no white man of that name appears here, or even in the bay towns, as an early settler," the name likely predates the colonial era settlement. Prior to 1720 John Houghton and his son, Jonas Houghton (1660–1723) were early residents of Vaughn's Hill, when it was known as Vans Hill. For at least much of the remaining eighteenth century, it was known as Van's Hill. In the twentieth century geologists surveyed the hill and named the mineral formations, the Vaughn Hill formation or conglomerate. In 1990 and 2001 the town of Bolton acquired public conservation land on the hill.
