= Still River (Nashua River) =

River in Worcester County, Massachusetts, United States

Coordinates: 42°28′50″N 71°38′03″W

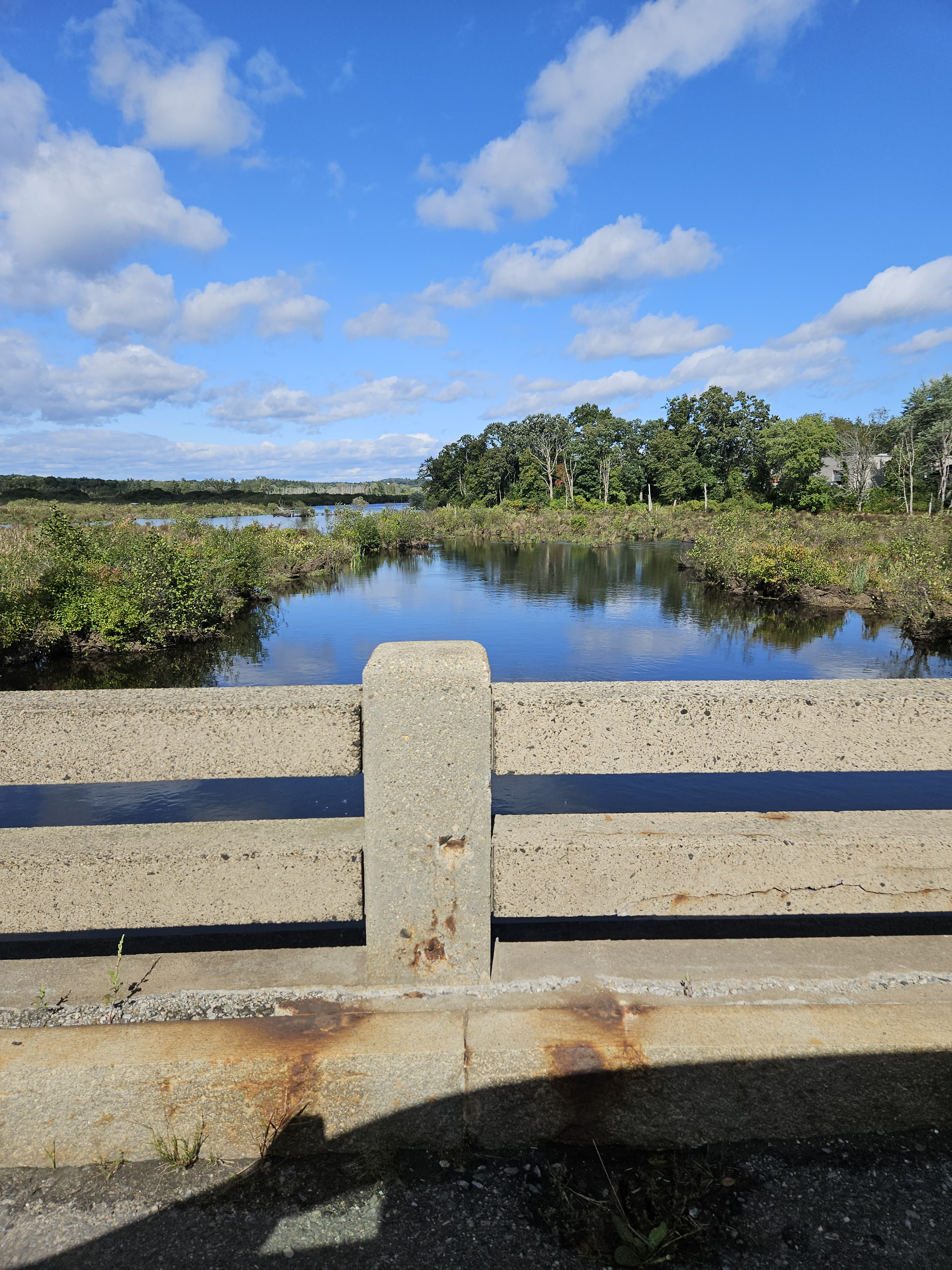
Still River in Bolton as seen from bridge on Route 117 near Lancaster border

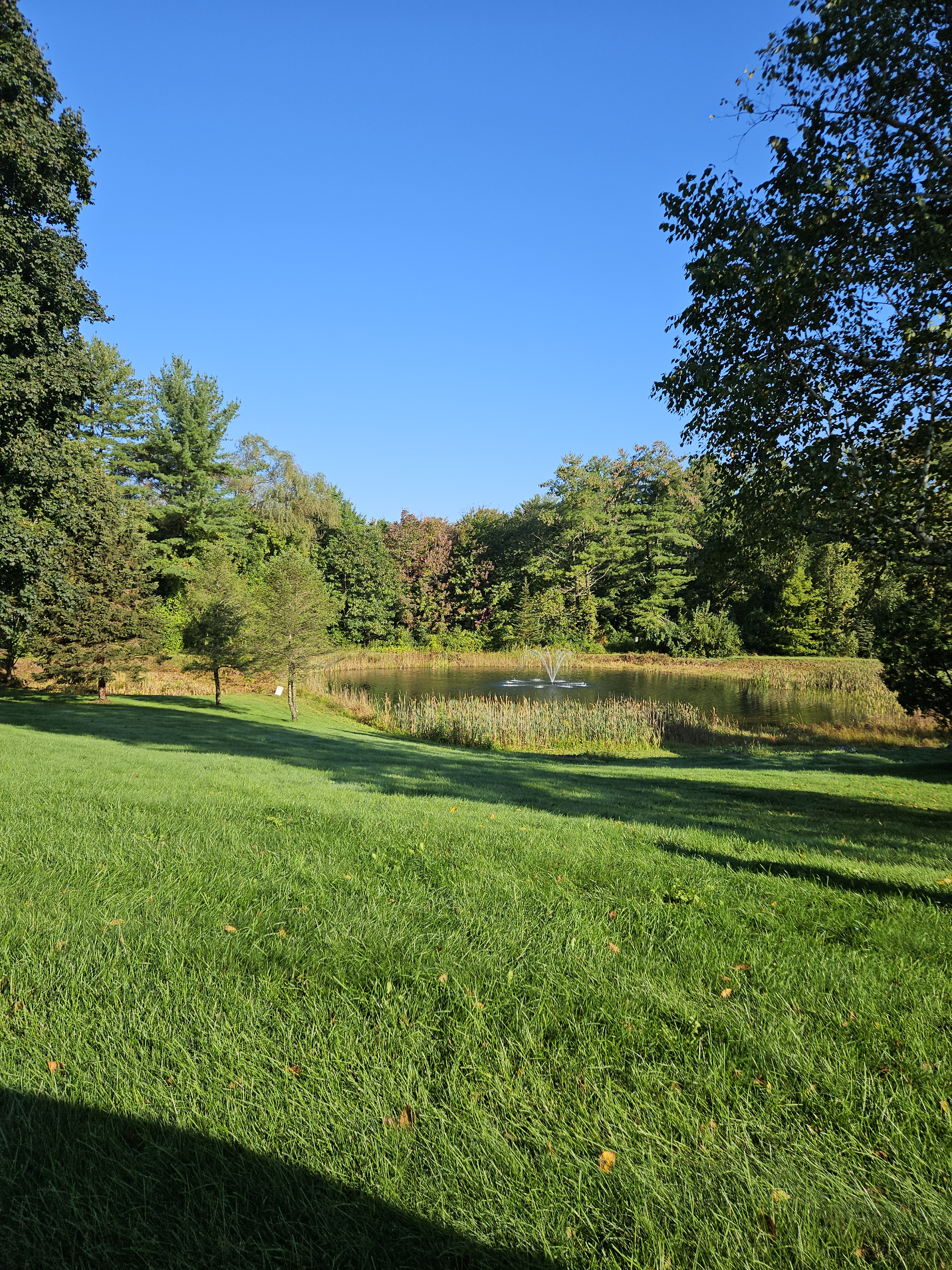
Pond at the headwaters of the Still River off Pondside Drive in Bolton

The Still River is a 5-mile-long (8.0 km) tributary of the Nashua River in Bolton, Massachusetts and Harvard, Massachusetts. The river is located near Lancaster, Massachusetts in eastern Worcester County, Massachusetts. The village of Still River, Massachusetts is located in Harvard, Massachusetts, where the river merges with the Nashua in the Bolton Flats.

== Course and watershed ==
The Still River headwaters emanate from a pond in Bolton. The river meanders through Bolton and Harvard before flowing parallel with the Nashua River and then converging into the Nashua River near Still River Road and Still River village near the Bolton, Lancaster, and Harvard borders.

According to Massachusetts Department of Conservation and Recreation, "[t]he flat lowland between the Nashua River and the Still River is called Bolton Flats and is the result of the receded glacial Lake Nashua. The area is protected by the Commonwealth as the Bolton Flats Wildlife Management Area, which is in Harvard, Bolton and Lancaster. At the Bolton entrance to the Bolton Flats Management Area there is a modest early 20th century cape with a gambrel roof barn, owned by the state." The Still River area contains various Native American objects and was the site of brickmaking from colonial times into the nineteenth century. Several nearby brick houses, including the Haynes House (ca. 1820) at 304 Still River Road, were likely constructed using bricks from the Haynes Brickyard on the Still River.

== See also ==
- List of rivers in Massachusetts
