= John Whitcomb (general) =

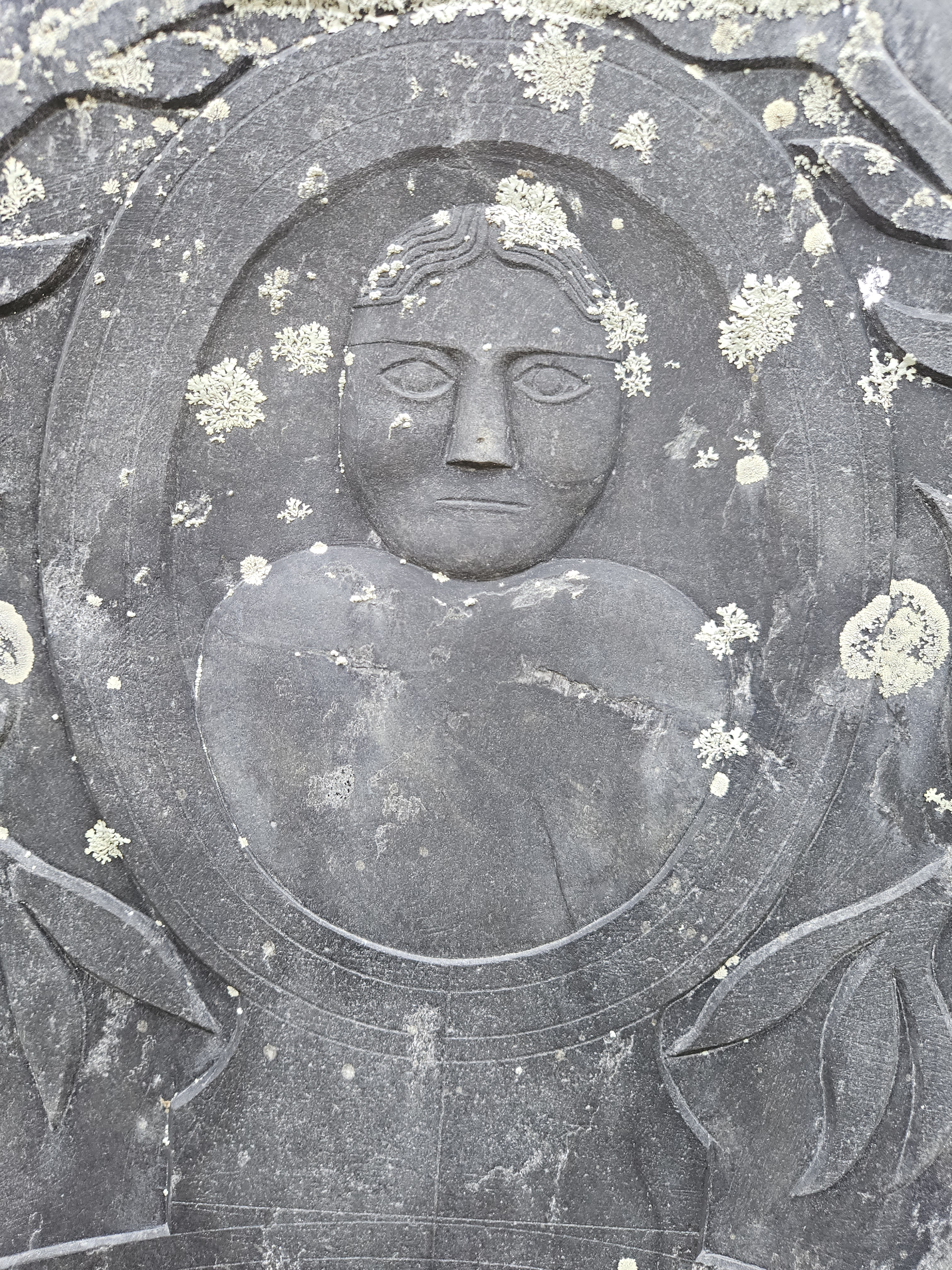
Image of man on gravestone of General John Whitcomb in Bolton, MA

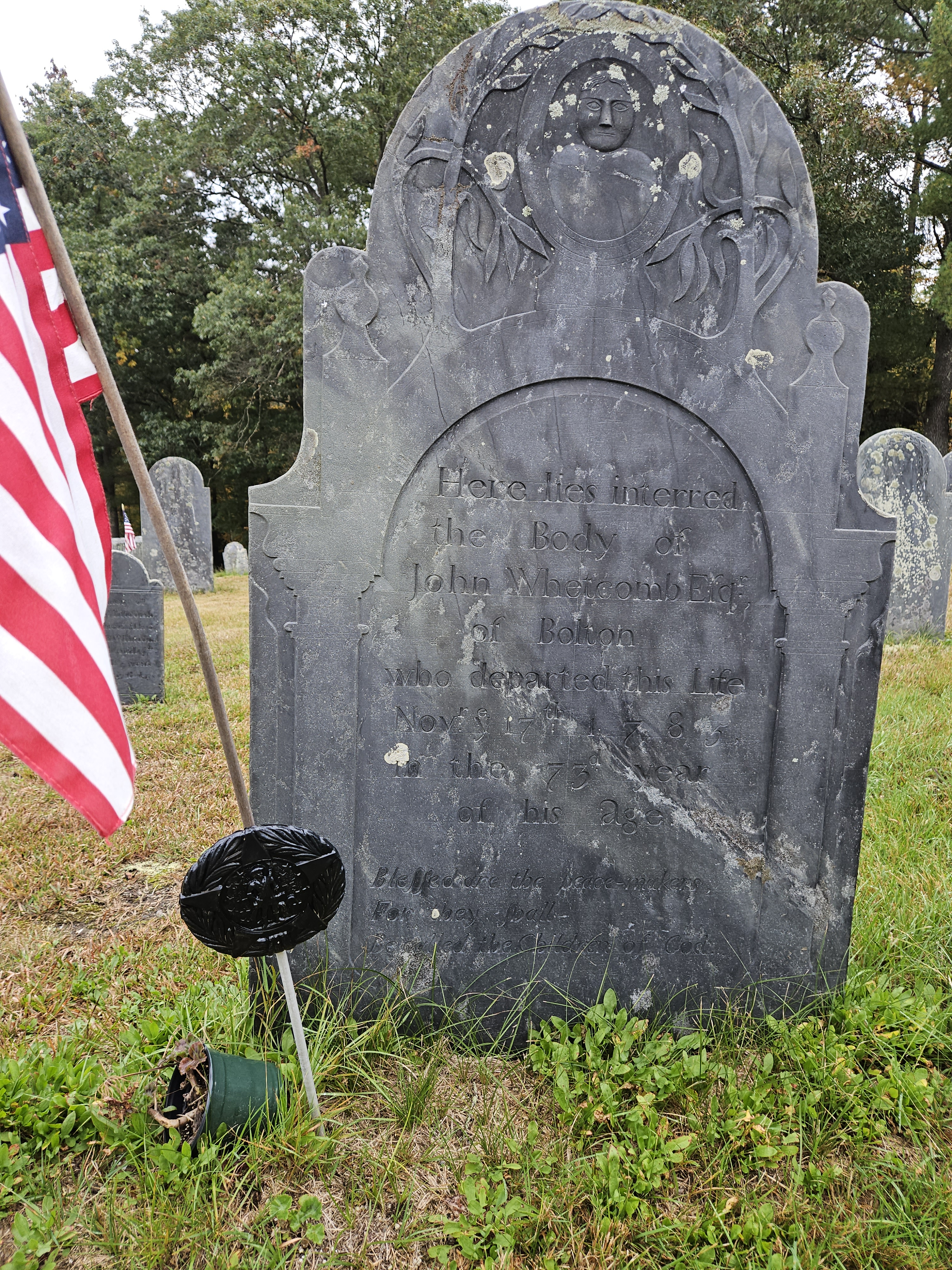
Revolutionary War General John Whitcomb gravestone in South Burying Ground Bolton MA USA

John Whitcomb (1713–1785) (also known as John Whetcomb) was a state representative, minuteman, and American Revolutionary War militia general from Massachusetts.

== Early life ==
Whitcomb was born in what is now Bolton, Massachusetts, then part of Lancaster, Massachusetts. Whitcomb's parents, John Whitcomb and Rebecca (Wilder) Whitcomb, died when he was young and Whitcomb's uncle, Joseph Sawyer, the local blacksmith, became his guardian until Whitcomb reached majority and inherited the family farm. Whitcomb was the older brother of Colonel Asa Whitcomb. During the French and Indian War John Whitcomb served as a field officer in the Massachusetts provincial regiments in 1755, 1758, and 1760.

== Political career and Revolutionary War service ==
After the war he was involved in local government in Bolton, Massachusetts and was elected to be a representative to the Massachusetts General Court many times. In February 1775 the Massachusetts Provincial Congress commissioned him as brigadier general. Whitcomb also served as a colonel of the Worcester County minuteman, and on April 19, 1775, he helped pursue the British after the Battles of Lexington and Concord. In June 1775 Whitcomb was elected first major general of the Massachusetts provincial army and led a regiment at Lechmere Point during the Battle of Bunker Hill. He was not reappointed by Congress, but he was elected a brigadier general on June 1776, but did not serve due to his advanced age. Whitcomb died on November 17, 1785, and was buried in Old South Burying Ground in Bolton.
