= Pan Burying Ground =

Historic cemetery in Massachusetts, United States

- U.S. National Register of Historic Places
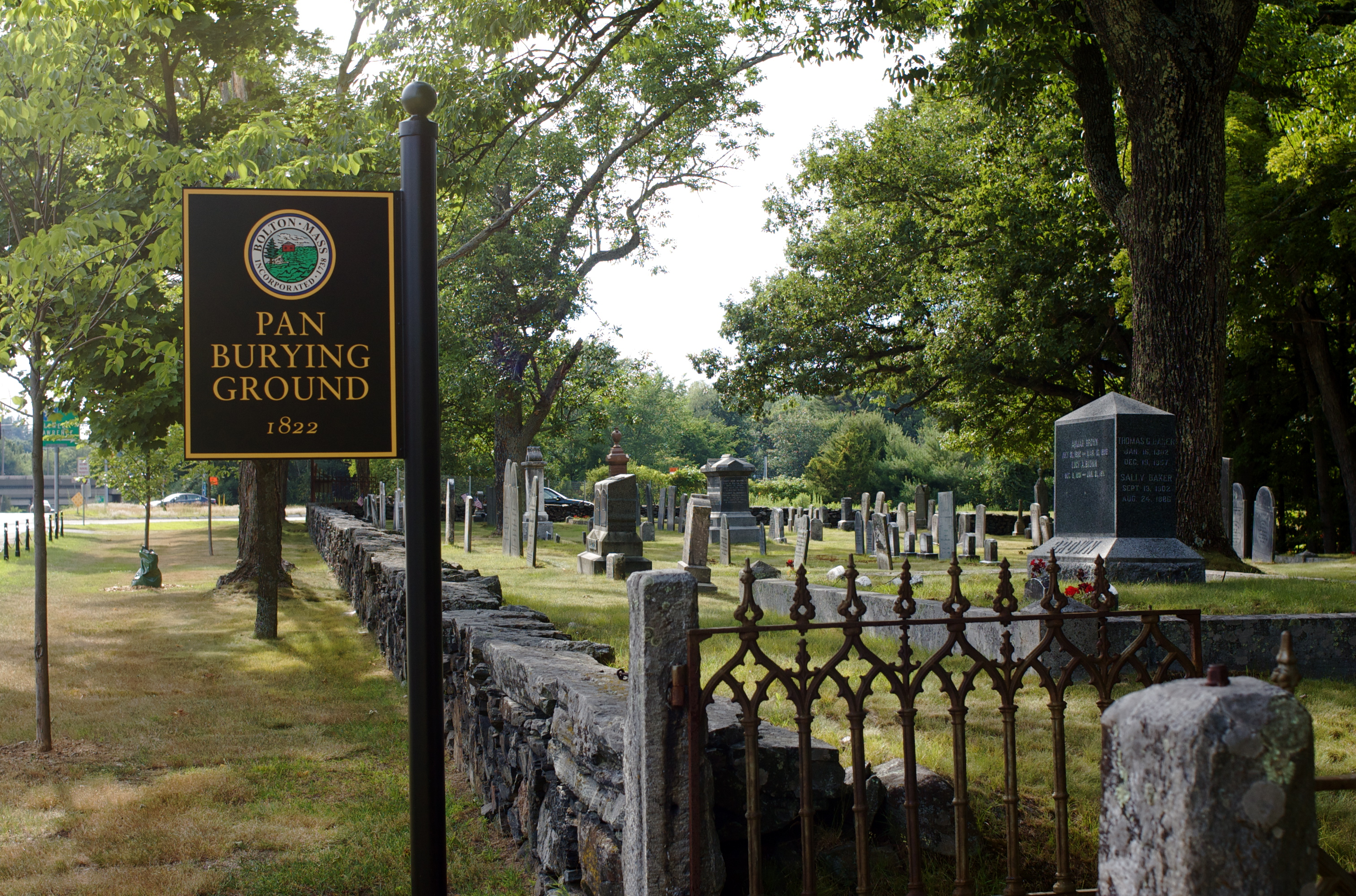

- Location within Massachusetts Location within the United States
- Location: Bolton, Massachusetts
- Coordinates: 42°25′50″N 71°35′24″W
- Area: 3.3 acres (1.3 ha)
- Built: 1822
- Architect: Allen & Baldwin
- NRHP reference No.: 07000682
- Added to NRHP: July 11, 2007

The Pan Burying Ground (also known as the Pan Cemetery, East Burying Ground, and East Cemetery) is an historic cemetery on 477 Main Street in Bolton, Massachusetts. Established in 1822, the cemetery was the second in the town. It was named for the area known locally as "The Pan", which had by then become the second-largest village center in the town. The original 1.18-acre (0.48 ha) plot has 400 marked graves, and is presumed to contain further unmarked graves, based on a pattern of marker layout at the rear of this portion of the cemetery. The cemetery was enlarged to 3.3 acres (1.3 ha) in the 1960s. It is distinctive in Bolton for its seven-chambered group tomb, built in 1839 at the southeast corner of the property.

The cemetery was listed on the National Register of Historic Places in 2007.

== See also ==
- National Register of Historic Places listings in Worcester County, Massachusetts
