= Suzy Becker =

American writer (born 1962)

Suzanne "Suzy" Becker (born 1962) is an American author and illustrator known for books such as All I Need to Know I Learned from My Cat. As of 2023, she was illustrating for The New Yorker.

== Early life ==
Becker grew up near Philadelphia. She graduated from Brown University in 1984 with bachelor's degrees in economics and international relations, and spent her first summer out of college biking 4,500 miles (7,200 km) across the United States. After a brief period as a second grade teacher at the American School of Barcelona, she moved to Boston, Massachusetts to start her writing career.

== Career ==
Becker is best known for her 1990 internationally bestselling book All I Need to Know I Learned from My Cat, which sold two million copies and spent 28 weeks on the New York Times bestseller list, with several at #1.

Becker began as an advertising copywriter in Boston. The job allowed her to hone her talents for insightful and irreverent writing, which would later become her trademark in her books and cartoons. In 1987, she founded her greeting card company, the Widget Factory, which garnered recognition for its humor, witty drawings, and corporate social responsibility. From 1987 until 1993, Becker worked as president, and owner of the Widget Factory greeting card line, creating over 200 different card designs, posters, and a maternity Advent calendar (which she invented).

Additionally, during that time, Becker also spearheaded national service projects. In 1989, she founded Ride FAR, the first U.S. HIV/AIDS bike-a-thon, which has occurred biannually since its inception. Ride FAR, or the Ride for AIDS Resources, is a biannual event that gives 100% all proceeds raised directly to services for children and adults living with HIV/AIDS. To date, the ride has raised more than $1,100,000 for HIV/AIDS resources.

Becker eventually licensed the Widget Factory in early 1993, so that she could accept her appointment as a White House Fellow under President Bill Clinton from 1993 to 1994. Upon her return from her fellowship at the White House, Becker helped found and taught at the Francis W. Parker Charter Essential School, an alternative public secondary school in central Massachusetts. She left the school after a few years to focus on writing and illustrating full-time. As of 2013, she taught creative writing at the Sawyer School in Bolton, Massachusetts.

Becker's work has appeared in various publications including Mademoiselle, Funny Times, The Best Contemporary Women's Humor, Grist.org, SEED, and The Boston Globe. Additionally, her work has been commissioned by the National Audubon Society, American Museum of Natural History, National Geographic Society, and the Environmental Defense Fund It has also been exhibited in solo and group shows throughout New England and New York, and is part of the permanent collection at the Museum of Comic and Cartoon Art. She illustrated the comic strip Rhymes With Orange while its creator Hilary Price was on vacation, June 9–14 and 22, 2008.

=== Books ===
Becker wrote her first book, All I Need to Know I Learned from My Cat, at age 27. The book made The New York Times best-seller list, where it remained for eight months. As of 2006, the book had sold 1.6 million copies. Her second book, The All Better Book, was inspired by her work in elementary schools and children's solutions to problems.

In 2005, she released an illustrated memoir about her own struggle and recovery from brain surgery entitled: I Had Brain Surgery, What's Your Excuse?. .In 2013, she released a second illustrated memoir, titled One Good Egg.

Her other works include My Dog's the World's Best Dog, Manny's Cows: The Niagara Falls Tale, and a board book with teething corners for babies entitled Books Are for Reading.

== Personal life ==
As of 2006, Becker was living in Bolton, Massachusetts with her wife and daughter, who was born in October 2004. She is bisexual.

Becker began having seizures in the mid-1990s. She underwent surgery for a benign mass on her brain in July 1999. Upon awaking from the surgery, she found "her personality altered and her speech impaired". She also lost the ability to read and write, which she later recovered. As of the early 2000s, Becker continued to have around one seizure per year.

== List of works ==
- All I Need to Know I Learned from My Cat (1990) ISBN 0894808249, 9780894808241
- The All Better Book (1992) ISBN 978-1-56305-314-6.
- All I Need to Know I Learned from My Cat- 1992 Calendar (1991)
- All I Need to Know I Learned from My Cat- 1993 Calendar (1992)
- All I Need to Know I Learned from My Cat- 1994 Calendar (1993)
- My Dog's the World's Best Dog (1995)
- There's a Cat in My Kitchen, Magnetic Kitchen Calendar- 2004 (2003)
- I Had Brain Surgery, What's Your Excuse? (2005)
- Manny's Cows: The Niagara Falls Tale (2006)
- All I Need to Know I Learned from My Cat (and Then Some). The Double-Platinum Collector's Edition (2007)
- Books Are for Reading (2009)
- Kids Make it Better (2011)
- One Good Egg (2013)
- Kate the Great, Except When She's Not (2014)
- Kate the Great: Winner Takes All (2016)

== Awards/distinctions ==
- New England Women Business Owners Woman of the Year (1992)
- Anti-Defamation League's A World of Difference Award for commitment to community service initiatives
- White House Fellowship (1993–1994)
- Bunting Fellowship from the Radcliffe Institute for Advanced Study at Harvard University (1999–2000)
- Work has been commissioned by the National Audubon Society, American Museum of Natural History, National Geographic Society, and the Environmental Defense Fund.
