= Memorial Hall (disambiguation) =

A memorial hall is a hall built as a memorial, typically to those who have lost their lives in war.

Memorial Hall may also refer to:

== United Kingdom ==
- Apprentice Boys Memorial Hall, Derry
- Congregational Memorial Hall, London
- Memorial Hall, Manchester
- Queen Victoria Memorial Hall, Coaltown of Balgonie
- Workingman's Institute and Memorial Hall, Newbridge

== United States ==
Arkansas

- Memorial Hall (University of Arkansas) in Fayetteville, listed on the U.S. National Register of Historic Places (NRHP)

Connecticut

- Memorial Hall (Windsor Locks, Connecticut), NRHP-listed

Delaware

- Memorial Hall (Delaware State) in Dover
- Memorial Hall (Newark, Delaware), NRHP-listed

Georgia

- Memorial Hall (University of Georgia) in Athens

Illinois

- Memorial Hall (Richmond, Illinois), NRHP-listed
- Memorial Hall (Rockford, Illinois)

Indiana

- Porter County Memorial Opera Hall, NRHP-listed

Kansas

- Memorial Hall (Independence, Kansas), NRHP-listed in Montgomery County
- Memorial Hall (Kansas City, Kansas)

Kentucky

- Memorial Hall (University of Kentucky) in Lexington

Maine

- Memorial Hall (Oakland, Maine), NRHP-listed

Maryland

- Memorial Hall (United States Naval Academy), in Annapolis

Massachusetts

- Memorial Hall (Dedham, Massachusetts)
- Memorial Hall (Foxborough, Massachusetts), NRHP-listed
- Memorial Hall (Harvard University), Cambridge, NRHP-listed
- Memorial Hall (Milford, Massachusetts), NRHP-listed
- Memorial Hall (Plymouth, Massachusetts)
- Memorial Hall (University of Massachusetts Amherst)
- Memorial Hall Library, Andover, NRHP-listed
- Memorial Hall Museum, Deerfield

Mississippi

- Memorial Hall (Natchez, Mississippi), or United States Courthouse, NRHP-listed and a Mississippi Landmark

North Carolina

- UNC Memorial Hall, Chapel Hill

Ohio

- Circleville Memorial Hall, NRHP-listed
- Dayton Memorial Hall, NRHP-listed
- Franklin County Memorial Hall in Columbus
- Memorial Hall (Cincinnati, Ohio) or Hamilton County Memorial Building, NRHP-listed
- Memorial Hall (University of Akron)

Pennsylvania

- Memorial Hall (Muhlenberg College), the indoor arena of the Muhlenberg Mules of Muhlenberg College in Allentown, Pennsylvania
- Memorial Hall (Philadelphia), NRHP-listed

South Carolina

- Memorial Hall, Coker University, in Hartsville, NRHP-listed

Tennessee

- Alumni Hall (Vanderbilt University), or Alumni Memorial Hall, Nashville, NRHP-listed
- Memorial Hall, Cumberland University, Lebanon, Tennessee, NRHP-listed in Wilson County
- Memorial Hall, Vanderbilt University, Nashville

Texas

- Memorial Hall School (Houston) — A former private school in Houston that was located in Spring Branch and later Lazybrook/Timbergrove.

Wisconsin

- Memorial Hall (Racine, Wisconsin), NRHP-listed
- Memorial Hall (Ashland, Wisconsin), NRHP-listed in Ashland County

== See also ==
- Confederate Memorial Hall (disambiguation)
- Memorial Building (disambiguation)
- Memorial Hall station (disambiguation)
