= George Pyne =

George Pyne may refer to:

- George Pyne (Medal of Honor) (1841–?), English Medal of Honor recipient
- George Pyne II (1909–1974), American football player
- George Pyne III (1941–2015), American football player
- George Pyne (business executive) (born 1965), American businessman
