= Upper Magazine Street Historic District =

Historic district in Massachusetts, United States

- U.S. National Register of Historic Places
- U.S. Historic district
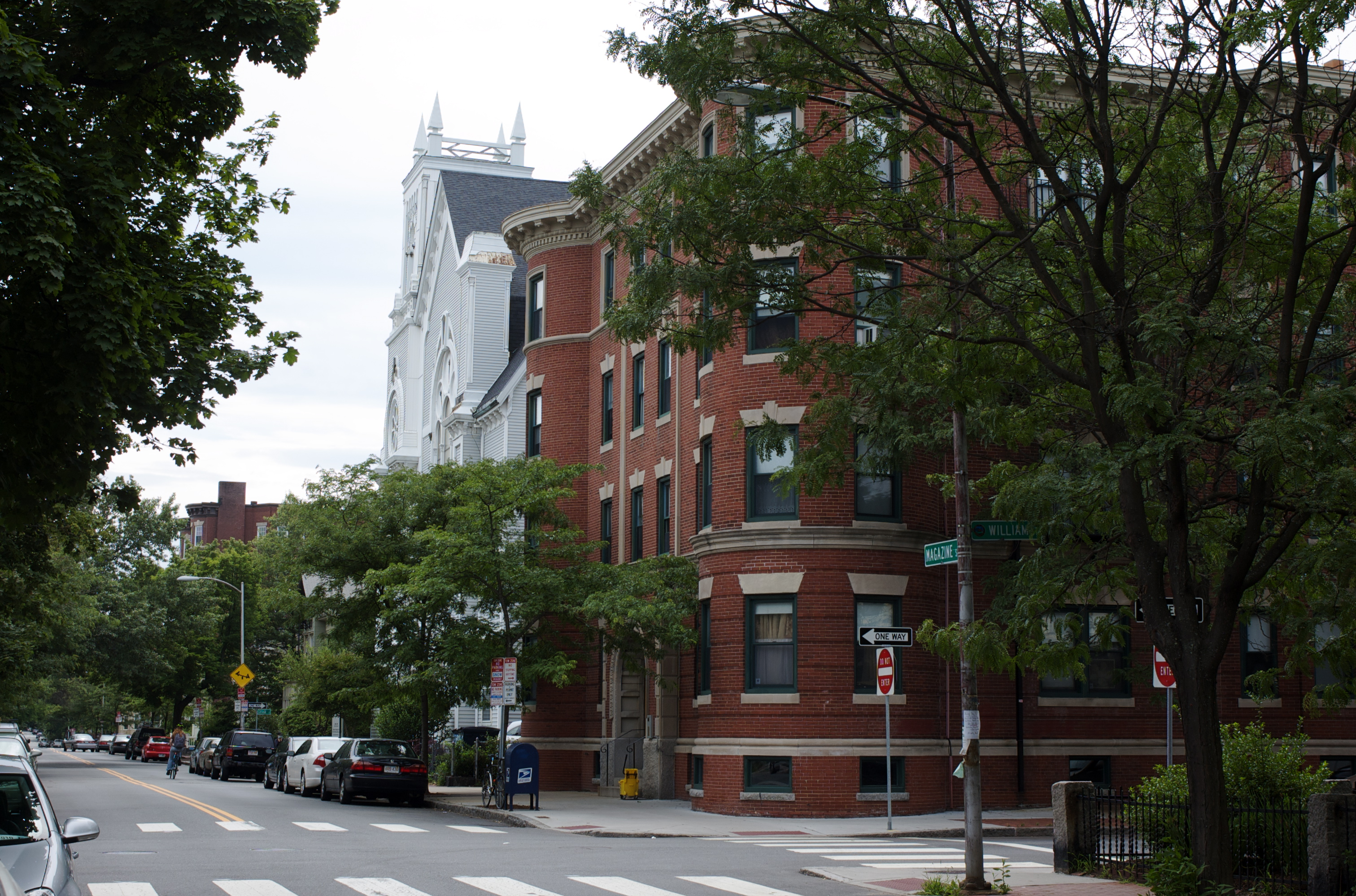

- Location within Massachusetts Location within the United States
- Location: Cambridge, Massachusetts
- Coordinates: 42°21′47″N 71°6′25″W
- Architect: Thomas W. Silloway, Franklin E. Kidder
- Architectural style: Greek Revival, Late Victorian
- MPS: Cambridge MRA
- NRHP reference No.: 82001981
- Added to NRHP: April 13, 1982

The Upper Magazine Street Historic District is a historic district encompassing a well-preserved stretch of mid-19th century housing in the Cambridgeport neighborhood of Cambridge, Massachusetts. It includes two blocks of Magazine Street, between Upton and William Streets, and one block of William Street, between Magazine and Pearl Streets. The properties in the district include a diversity of architectural styles popular between the 1840s and 1880s.

The district was added to the National Register of Historic Places in 1982.

== See also ==
- National Register of Historic Places listings in Cambridge, Massachusetts
