= Highrock Church =

Historic church in Massachusetts, United States

- Saint Athanasius Greek Orthodox Church
- U.S. National Register of Historic Places
- U.S. Historic district – Contributing property
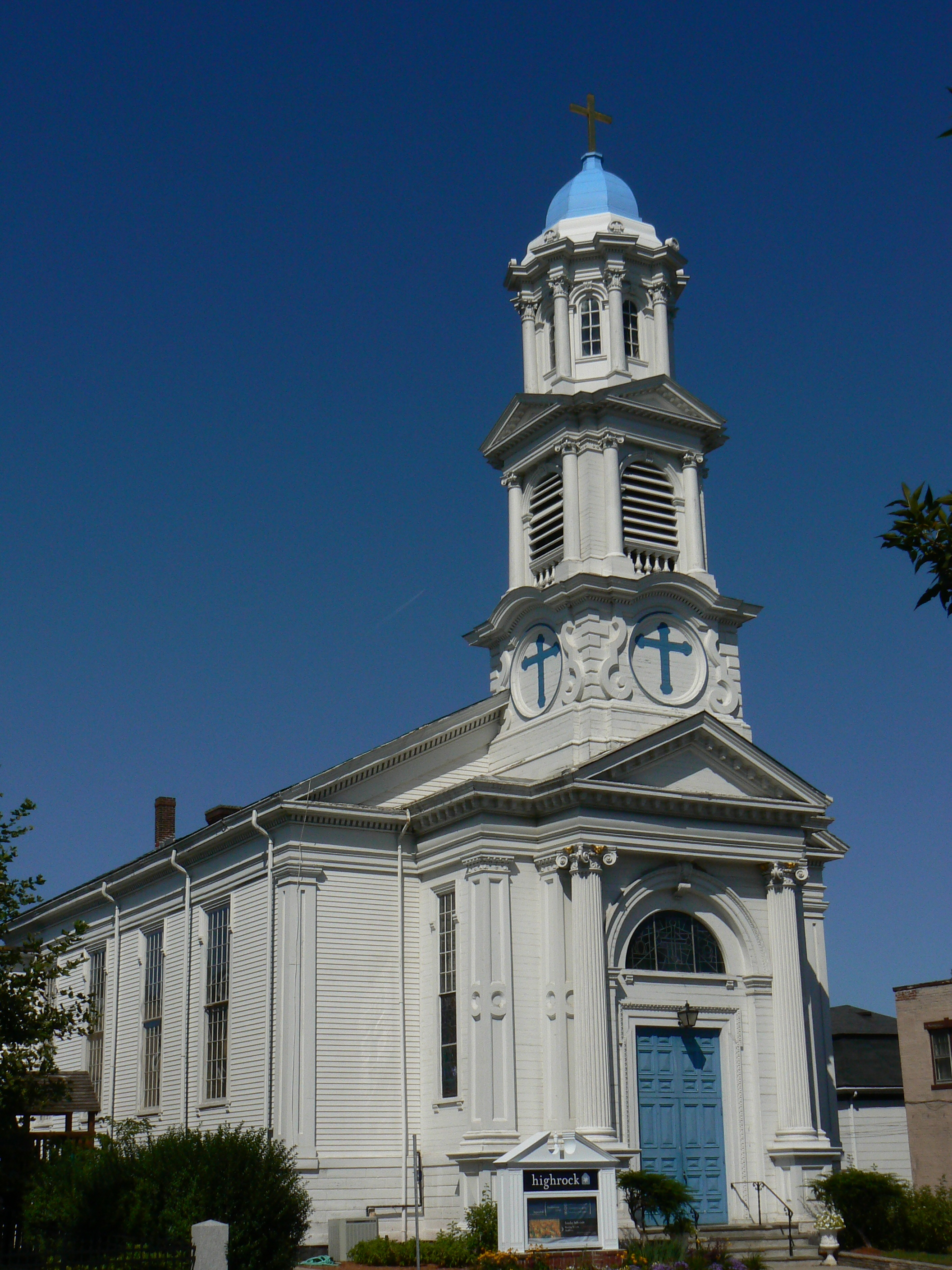
- Photograph taken in 2008

- Location within Massachusetts Location within the United States
- Location: Arlington, Massachusetts
- Coordinates: 42°24′59″N 71°9′27″W
- Built: 1841
- Architect: Thomas J. Silloway
- Architectural style: Romanesque
- Part of: Arlington Center Historic District (ID85002691)
- NRHP reference No.: 83000805

Significant dates
- Added to NRHP: June 23, 1983
- Designated CP: September 27, 1985

Highrock Church is an Evangelical Covenant Church congregation located in Arlington, Massachusetts. Founded in 1999, it occupies the former Saint Athanasius Greek Orthodox Church at 735 Massachusetts Avenue in the town center. The building, constructed in 1841 and restyled in 1860, is a prominent regional example of Italianate ecclesiastical architecture, and was listed on the National Register of Historic Places in 1983.

== Building architecture and history ==
Highrock Church stands on the west side of Arlington Center, on the north side of Massachusetts Avenue between Central Street and Mill Street. It is a basically rectangular single-story wood-frame structure, with a gabled roof and clapboarded exterior. It is fronted by a projecting vestibule with elaborate Classical features, capped by an equally elaborate three-stage tower topped by a blue cupola. The interior is more modestly styled.

The church building was constructed in 1841 for a Universalist congregation that had broken off from First Parish Congregational Church, which maintained a Unitarian belief. It was originally trimmed with Greek Revival features, and lacked the projecting entry and tower. In 1860 it was substantially altered according to plans developed by ecclesiastical architect Thomas Silloway, which included the elaborate front and a tower with a 90-foot (27 m) spire. The spire was damaged in the Great New England Hurricane of 1938, and was replaced by the cupola. The church's architecture is regarded as one of the finest examples of early Italianate ecclesiastical architecture in the Greater Boston area.

In 1961, the two congregations reunited at the Unitarian Church. In 1964, Saint Athasius Greek Orthodox Church purchased the building from the Universalists and made the site its home until 2004. The church building was added to the National Register of Historic Places in 1983. In 2006, the Highrock congregation purchased the building, after the Greek Orthodox congregation moved to a larger structure (the former St. James Roman Catholic Church in Arlington).

== Congregation history ==
The Highrock congregation was established in 1999 in Needham, Massachusetts, adopting the name "Highrock" from the street on which they met. The joined the Evangelical Covenant Church in 2003, and in 2006 purchased this building. In 2008, Highrock launched its first church plant, establishing a new congregation in Brookline. In the summer of 2012, Highrock launched two new church plants in Quincy and Salem.

== See also ==
- National Register of Historic Places listings in Arlington, Massachusetts
