= Dexter Universalist Church (Dexter, Maine) =

Historic church in Maine, United States

- U.S. National Register of Historic Places
- Location within Maine Location within the United States
- Location: Church St., Dexter, Maine
- Coordinates: 45°1′29″N 69°17′22″W
- Area: 1 acre (0.40 ha)
- Built: 1867
- Architect: Thomas Silloway
- NRHP reference No.: 85001258
- Added to NRHP: June 20, 1985

Dexter Universalist Church, or the First Universalist Church of Dexter, is a historic church on Church Street in Dexter, Maine. Built in the 1820s and restyled in the 1860s, it is a distinctive work of Boston, Massachusetts architect Thomas Silloway. The building was listed on the National Register of Historic Places in 1985.

== Description and history ==
The Dexter Universalist Church stands in Dexter's town center, at the northeast corner of Hall Street and Church Street (Maine State Routes 7 and 23). It is a two-story wood-frame structure, with mostly clapboard siding and a front-facing gable roof. In front of the main block is a projecting hip-roofed and flush-boarded vestibule area, from which a multi-stage square tower rises to a belfry and steeple. The vestibule is three bays wide, with narrow segmented-arch windows on either side of the entrance, which is set within a large segmented-arch opening at the front of a projecting gable-roofed section with a dentillated cornice. The interior walls and ceiling of the main sanctuary are finished in pressed metal.

The main body of the church was built about 1828–29, but most of the building's styling comes from a major renovation conducted 1867-70 from a design by Boston architect Thomas Silloway. Although Silloway (probably best known for his design of the Vermont State House) was a prolific church designer, this is one of only three relatively unaltered instances of his work left in the state of Maine.

== See also ==
- National Register of Historic Places listings in Penobscot County, Maine
