= Milford, Massachusetts =

- Town
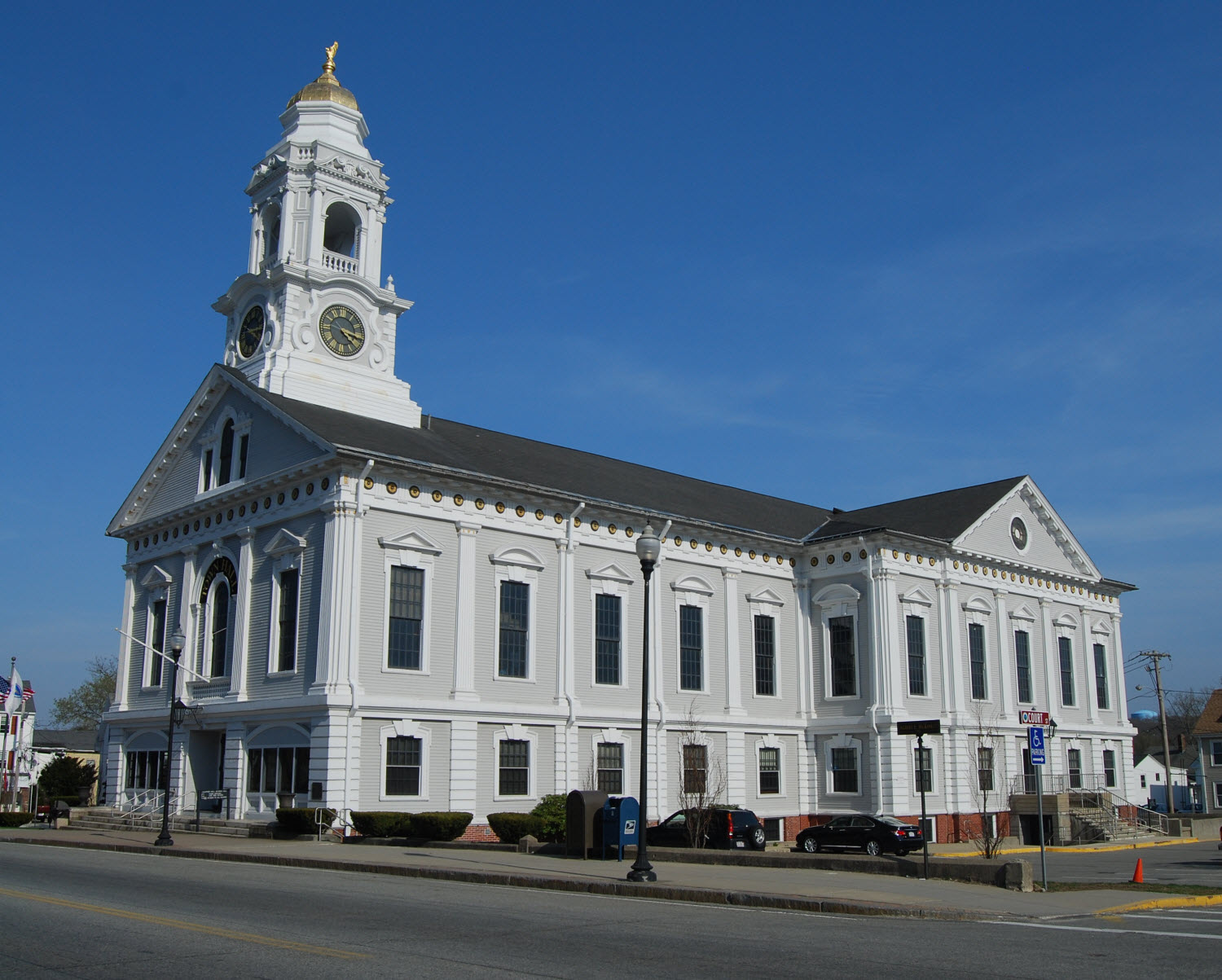
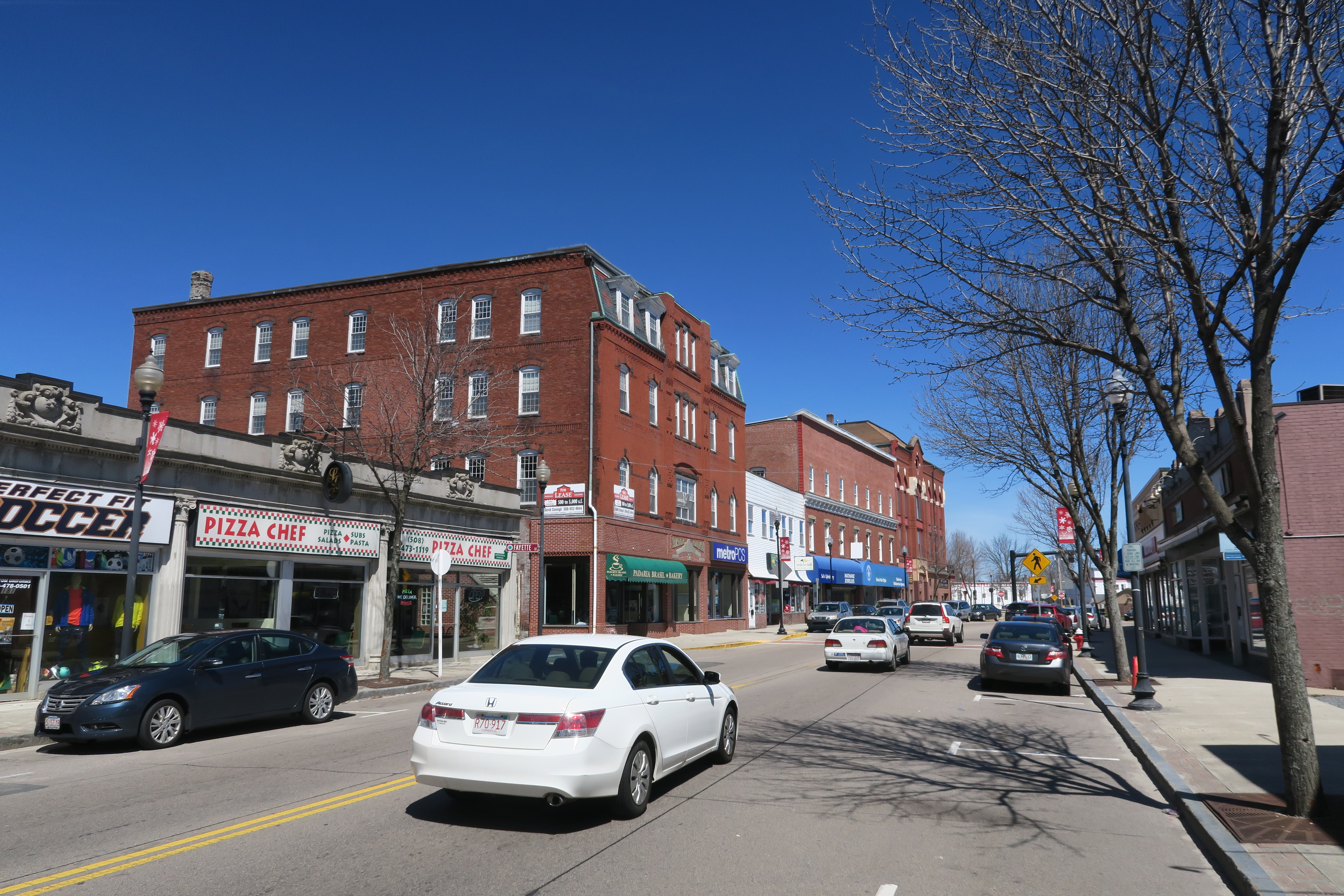
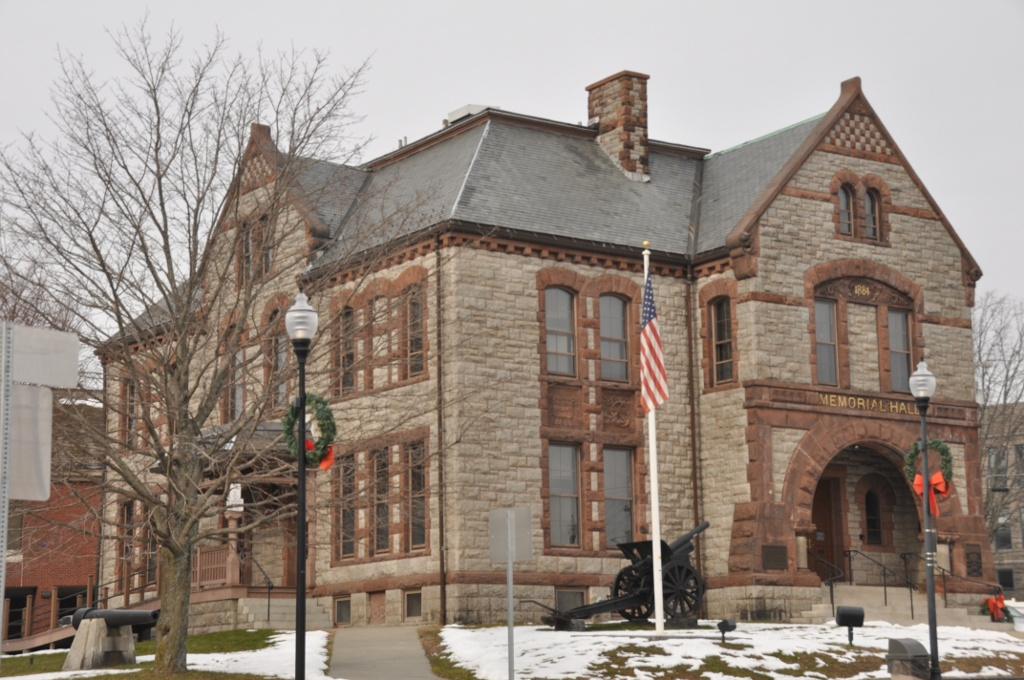
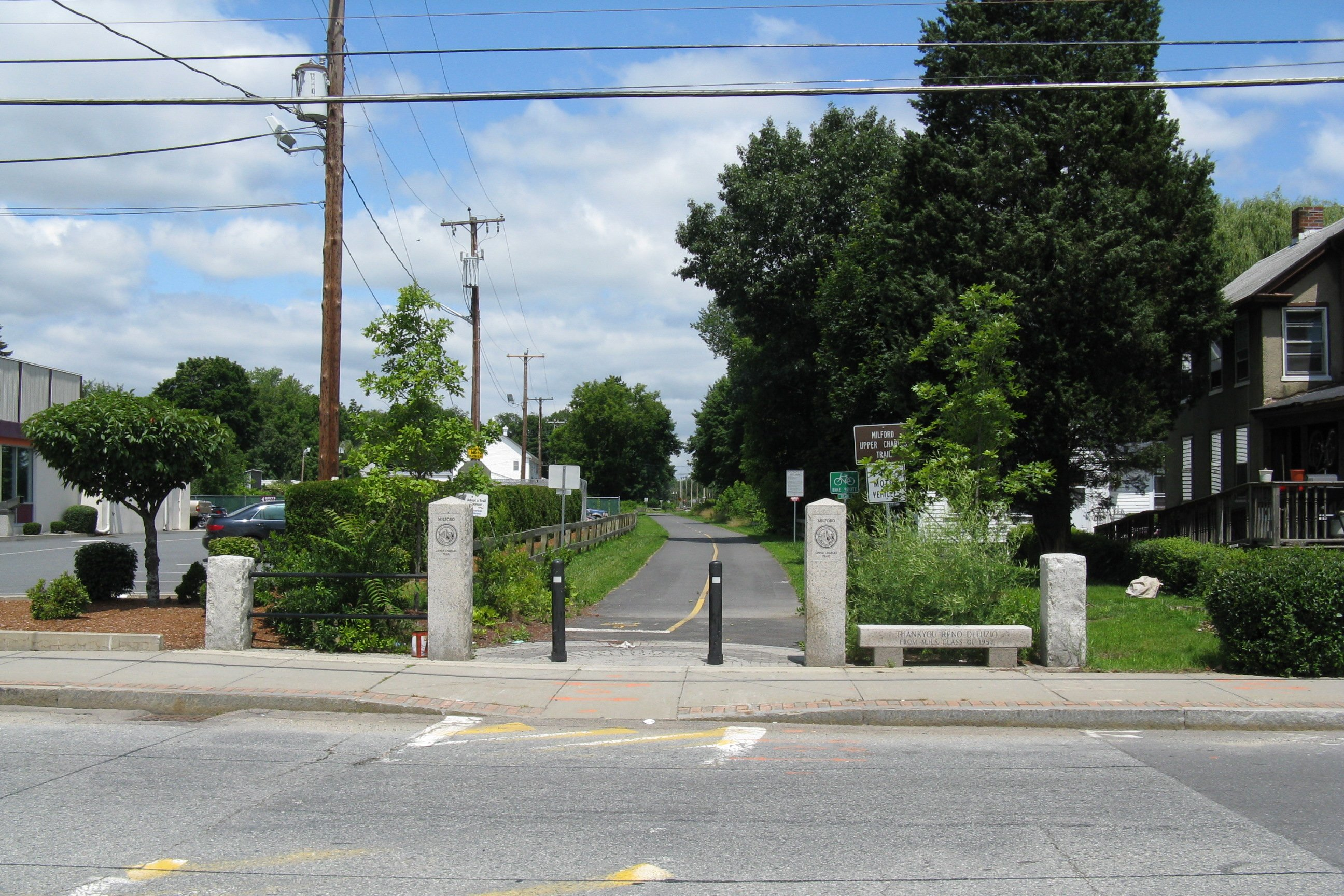
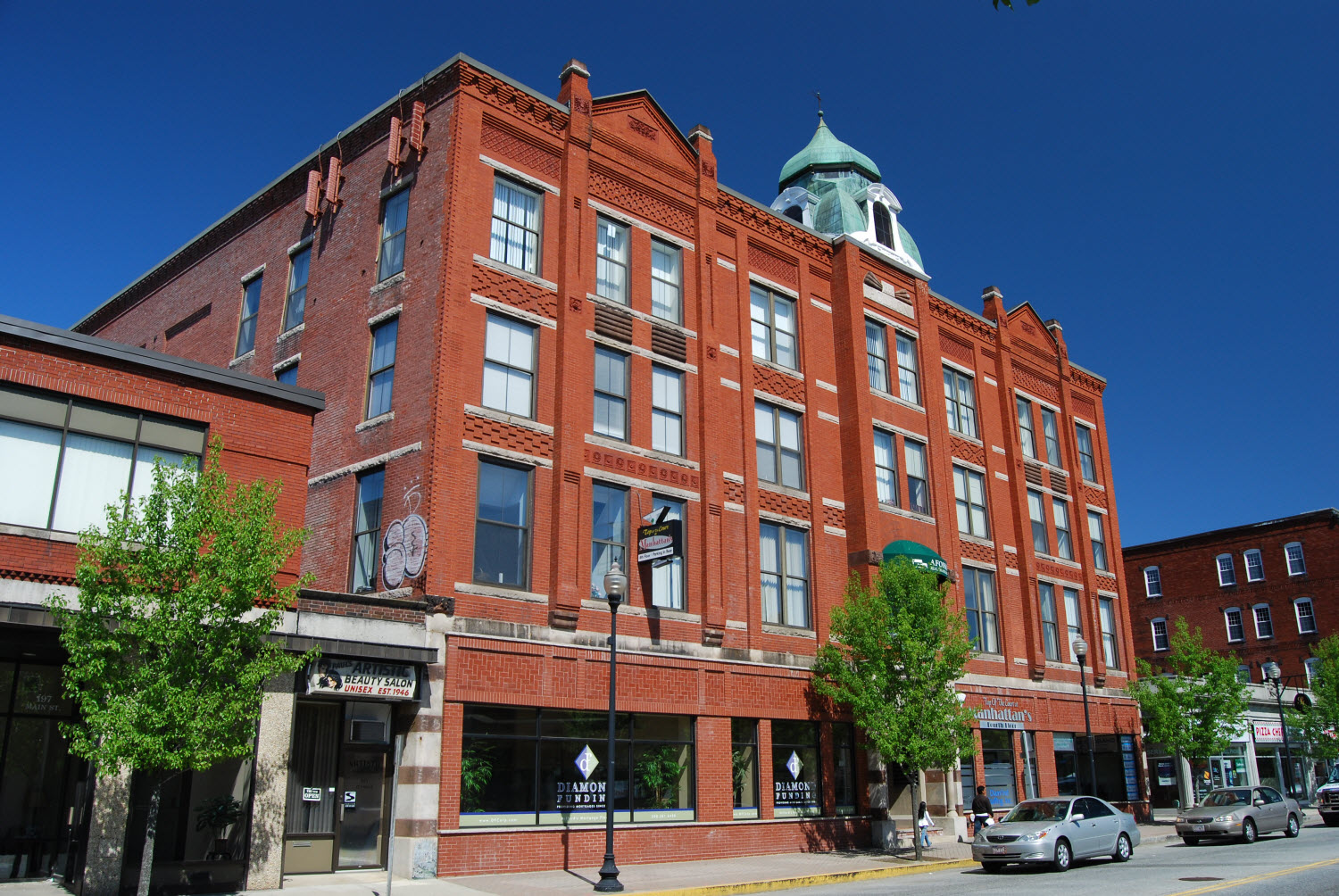
- Left to right from top: Milford Town Hall, Main Street, Memorial Hall, Charles Rail Trail, the Gillon Block

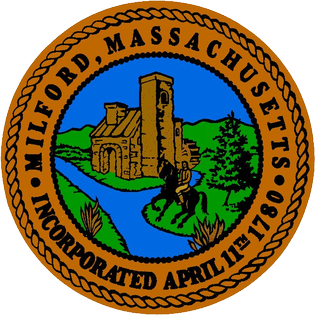
- Seal

- Location in Worcester County and the state of Massachusetts
- Coordinates: 42°08′23″N 71°31′00″W
- Country: United States
- State: Massachusetts
- County: Worcester
- Settled: 1662
- Incorporated: 1780

Government
  - Type: Representative town meeting

Area
  - Total: 14.9 sq mi (38.5 km^{2})
  - Land: 14.6 sq mi (37.8 km^{2})
  - Water: 0.27 sq mi (0.7 km^{2})
- Elevation: 308 ft (94 m)

Population (2020)
  - Total: 30,379
  - Density: 2,080/sq mi (804/km^{2})
- Demonym: Milfordian
- Time zone: UTC−5 (Eastern)
  - Summer (DST): UTC−4 (Eastern)
- ZIP Code: 01757
- Area code: 508/774
- FIPS code: 25-41165
- GNIS feature ID: 0618372
- Website: www.milfordma.gov

Milford is a town in Worcester County, Massachusetts, United States. The population was 30,379 according to the 2020 census. It contains the census-designated place of the same name. First settled in 1662 and incorporated in 1780, Milford became a booming industrial and quarrying community in the 19th century due to its unique location which includes the nearby source of the Charles River, the Mill River, the Blackstone River watershed, and large quantities of Milford pink granite.

== History ==
Milford was first settled in 1662 as a part of Mendon after Native Americans, including the Sachem, Quashaamit, granted land to the early settlers. King Philip's War destroyed the town in 1676, but settlers returned in 1680. The Mill River flows through Milford and had several conspicuous fords that were familiar to the Native Americans, and used by the early white settlers. These "mill (river) fords" are said to have given Milford its name. Milford was incorporated April 11, 1780, and the first town hall built in 1819; a brick structure later named the Town House School. The current town hall was built in 1854 by architect Thomas Silloway.

Milford is renowned for its Milford pink granite, discovered in 1870. Milford quarries fueled the local economy until about 1940. The granite has been used for local buildings such as Memorial Hall; the Bancroft Memorial Library in Hopedale; Worcester City Hall; and the Boston Public Library. Other notable buildings include the original Pennsylvania Station in New York City; the main post office in New York City; and more recently the Singapore Changi Airport in 2002.

The Milford Hospital was donated in 1903 by Governor Eben Sumner Draper. Today, the health care facility exists as the Milford Regional Medical Center. In January 2008, the Center opened a cancer treatment facility with the Dana–Farber Cancer Institute. The center is affiliated with UMass Medical Center as a teaching hospital. In 2015 the hospital completed a $54-million expansion project that created a new emergency department and updated the intensive care unit, as well as patient rooms.

== Geography ==
According to the United States Census Bureau, the town has a total area of 14.9 square miles (39 km^{2}), of which 14.6 square miles (38 km^{2}) is land, and 0.3 square miles (0.78 km^{2}), or 1.82%, is water. Milford is drained by the Charles River.

The town is crossed by Interstate 495 and state routes 16, 85, 109, and 140.

== Demographics ==
Historical population
| Year | Pop. | ±% |
|---|---|---|
| 1790 | 839 | — |
| 1850 | 4,819 | +474.4% |
| 1860 | 9,132 | +89.5% |
| 1870 | 9,890 | +8.3% |
| 1880 | 9,310 | −5.9% |
| 1890 | 8,780 | −5.7% |
| 1900 | 11,376 | +29.6% |
| 1910 | 13,055 | +14.8% |
| 1920 | 13,471 | +3.2% |
| 1930 | 14,741 | +9.4% |
| 1940 | 15,388 | +4.4% |
| 1950 | 15,442 | +0.4% |
| 1960 | 15,749 | +2.0% |
| 1970 | 19,352 | +22.9% |
| 1980 | 23,390 | +20.9% |
| 1990 | 25,355 | +8.4% |
| 2000 | 26,799 | +5.7% |
| 2010 | 27,999 | +4.5% |
| 2020 | 30,379 | +8.5% |
| 2024* | 30,640 | +0.9% |
* = population estimate. Source: United States census records and Population Estimates Program data.

As of the census of 2000, there were 26,799 people, 10,420 households, and 7,200 families residing in the town. The population density was 1,835.6 inhabitants per square mile (708.7/km^{2}). There were 10,713 housing units at an average density of 733.8 per square mile (283.3/km^{2}). The racial makeup of the town was 92.95% White; 1.35% Black or African American; 0.11% Native American; 1.76% Asian; 0.06% Pacific Islander; 1.99% from other races; and 1.77% from two or more races. Hispanic or Latino people of any race were 4.36% of the population.

There were 10,420 households, out of which 33.4% had children under the age of 18 living with them; 54.0% were married couples living together; 11.2% had a female householder with no husband present; and 30.9% were non-families. 25.6% of all households were made up of individuals, and 9.5% had someone living alone who was 65 years of age or older. The average household size was 2.54 and the average family size was 3.08.

In the town, the population was spread out, with 24.8% under the age of 18; 6.5% from 18 to 24; 33.2% from 25 to 44; 22.6% from 45 to 64; and 12.9% who were 65 years of age or older. The median age was 37 years. For every 100 females, there were 94.3 males. For every 100 females age 18 and over, there were 90.6 males.

The median income for a household in the town was $50,856, and the median income for a family was $61,029. Males had a median income of $42,173 versus $30,989 for females. The per capita income for the town was $23,742. About 5.8% of families and 7.2% of the population were below the poverty line, including 8.9% of those under age 18 and 10.4% of those age 65 or over.

== Economy ==
Milford has been growing at a fast rate since the introduction of Interstate 495, which opened in the area with dual exits at Route 85 and Route 109 in 1969. Since then many major retailers have opened in town.

The Waters Corporation is based in Milford.

== Government ==
State government
| State Representative(s): | Brian W Murray (D) |
| State Senator(s): | Becca Rausch (D) |
| Governor's Councilor(s): | Jen Caissie (R) |
Federal government
| U.S. Representative(s): | Jake Auchincloss (D-4th District), |
| U.S. Senators: | Elizabeth Warren (D), Ed Markey (D) |

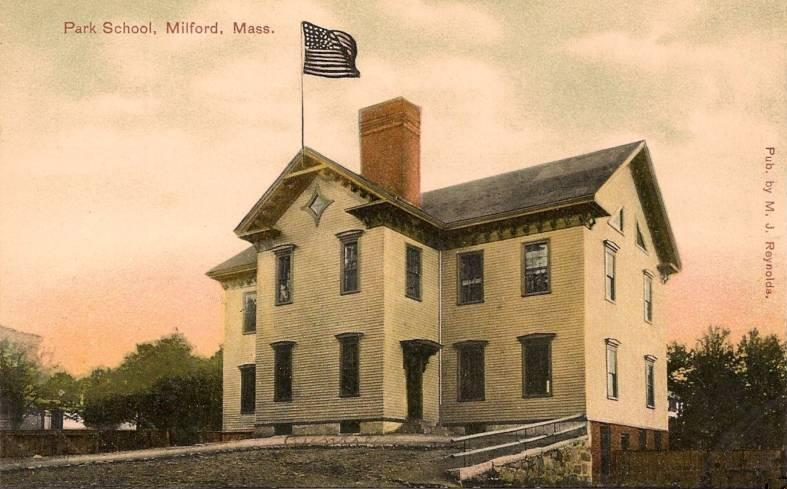
Old Park School in 1909

The core of Milford's governing system is the representative town meeting, where elected citizens can voice their opinions, but more importantly, directly effect changes in the community. Along with a Board of Selectmen, Town Administrator, Planning Board, Finance Committee, etc., the citizens of Milford have input into how the town is run.

The Massachusetts Department of Correction is headquartered in Milford.

== Library ==
The Milford Town Library was established in 1858. In fiscal year 2008, the town of Milford spent 1.5% ($966,758) of its budget on its public library—approximately $35 per person, per year ($42.87 adjusted for inflation to 2021).

== Education ==
Milford Public Schools operates six public schools, Shining Star Early Childhood Center (Preschool), Memorial Elementary School (Grades K to 2), Brookside Elementary School (Grades K to 2), Woodland Elementary School (Grades 3 to 5), Stacy Middle School (Grades 6 to 8), and Milford High School (Grades 9 to 12) (Grades 9 to 12). It is an eligible town for a vocational school, Blackstone Valley Regional Vocational Technical High School. Craig Consigli began serving as Superintendent in mid‑2025, after being appointed by the Milford School Committee. He was formally introduced as the next superintendent effective July 1, 2025.

== Annual events ==
- Independence Day fireworks, held on Plains Park within a day of July 4. There is also an annual parade.
- Portuguese Picnic, a two-night festival held at the Portuguese Club

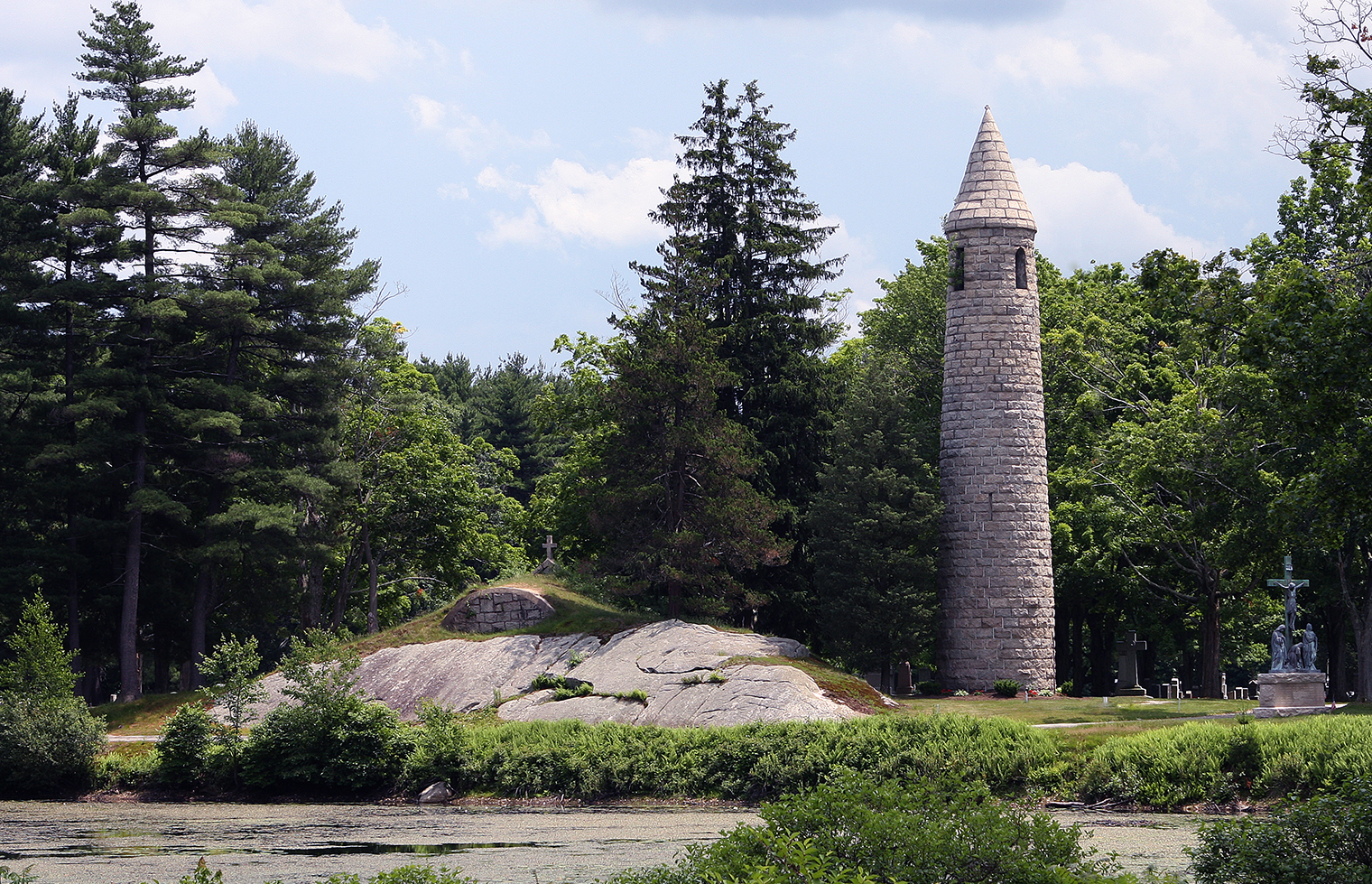
Irish Round Tower, Milford

== Sites of interest ==
- Memorial Hall, home and museum of the Milford Historical Commission
- NEMBA Trails (Milford, Massachusetts)|NEMBA Trails, The NEMBA Trails in Milford, Massachusetts,is a woodland trail network maintained by the New England Mountain Bike Association and noted for a singletrack that makes the area a popular site for mountain biking, running, and hiking.**
- Ted's Diner, placed on the National Register of Historic Places in 2000, was the oldest diner built by the Tierney Diner Company. Ted's was left abandoned by the town and vandalized, eventually moved to make way for a new fire station.
- St. Mary's Cemetery holds the only Irish round tower in the United States, built from local granite.

== Media ==
- The Milford Daily News is a daily newspaper covering Milford and several nearby towns in Norfolk and Worcester counties.
- WMRC 1490-AM and simulcasted as MyFM 101.3 on FM is the radio station licensed to serve Milford. Local news every morning with school cancellations and general information also. Local sports broadcasts of the local school teams or the major Boston sports teams can be heard on many nights. A Classic Hits format is the music that is playing when the station is playing music.
- Two non-profit public, educational, and government access (PEG) cable TV stations serve Milford-area subscribers on Channels 8 and 11. Channel 8 is the Milford town public-access television station that produces and runs a variety of local shows. Channel 11 is the Milford educational-access television station, and runs school committee meetings as well as projects made by students in the high school's video production classes.
- This area also receives the major television stations that serve the Boston area, which can be received over the air or through a cable or satellite provider.

== In popular culture ==
Milford was fictitiously featured in a 2008 episode of the Fox television series Fringe.

== Notable people ==
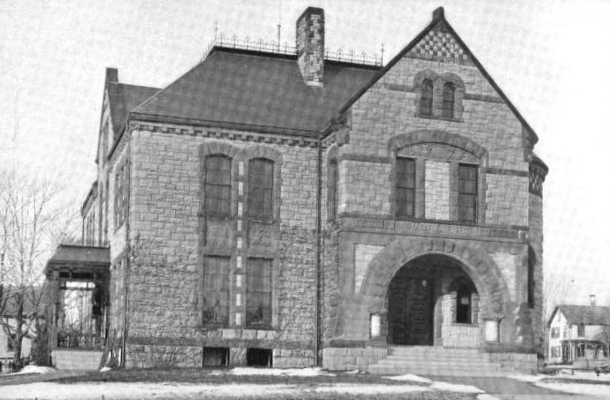
Milford Town Library, 1899

- Norm Abram, carpenter and co-host of This Old House; host of the New Yankee Workshop
- Adin Ballou, author, religious leader and prominent 19th-century proponent of pacifism, socialism and abolitionism; wrote The History of Milford, Massachusetts, 1882
- Nathan Barnatt, actor and comedian
- Michael Bavaro, producer of Rex Trailer's Boomtown
- Albert Fitch Bellows, artist
- Matthew Boldy, NHL Hockey player for the Minnesota Wild
- Robert Cenedella, artist
- Al Cass, musician and inventor
- Horace Brigham Claflin, merchant
- William Claflin, industrialist, philanthropist and governor
- Chris Colabello, Major League Baseball player
- Vincent Connare, designer of the Comic Sans and Trebuchet fonts
- Ezekiel Cornell, member of Continental Congress, 1780–1782
- Catherine Coyne, first woman to be elected into town office as Town Clerk in 1938
- Paul Coyne, award-winning producer and editor of TV series including Beyond Scared Straight and Big Brother
- John Davoren, politician
- Greg Dickerson, sports broadcaster
- William F. Draper, U.S. Representative, U.S. Ambassador to Italy
- Brian Fair, lead singer of the metal band Shadows Fall
- Rich Gotham, president of the Boston Celtics
- George F. Johnson, businessman
- Art Kenney, pitcher for the Boston Bees (later renamed the Boston Braves) in 1938
- Charles Laquidara, radio disc jockey
- Howie Long, NFL Hall of Famer, TV broadcaster and actor
- Ralph Lumenti, Major League Baseball player
- Leonard Chapin Mead, college president
- Richard T. Moore, politician
- Joseph E. Murray, pioneer in the area of organ transplants; 1990 recipient of the Nobel Prize for medicine
- Henry "Boots" Mussulli, jazz saxophonist
- Marie J. Parente, the only woman to serve on Milford's Select Board. Elected in 1972, she served until 1981.
- John Ritto Penniman, decorative painter, portraitist and decorator; his works are currently displayed in several notable museums, such as the Boston Museum of Fine Arts and the Art Institute of Chicago
- Gerard Phelan, football player who caught the famous 63-yard, game-winning touchdown pass (thrown by Doug Flutie) for the Boston College Eagles in an NCAA game against the Miami Hurricanes
- Ruth Pointer, singer and member of The Pointer Sisters
- George Pyne III, football player
- George Pyne, businessman
- Jim Pyne, former NFL player
- Jorge Rivera, mixed martial artist, UFC middleweight contender
- Brian Skerry, underwater photo-journalist
- Nikola Sacco, with Bartolomeo Vanzetti (AKA Sacco and Vanzetti) were Italian immigrants and anarchists who were controversially convicted of murder. Sacco lived in Milford for about seven years.
- Erik Per Sullivan, actor from Malcolm in the Middle, The Cider House Rules, and Christmas with the Kranks
- Michael Videira, midfielder for the Chicago Fire Soccer Club
- Jarvis White, Wisconsin State Assemblyman

== Gallery ==
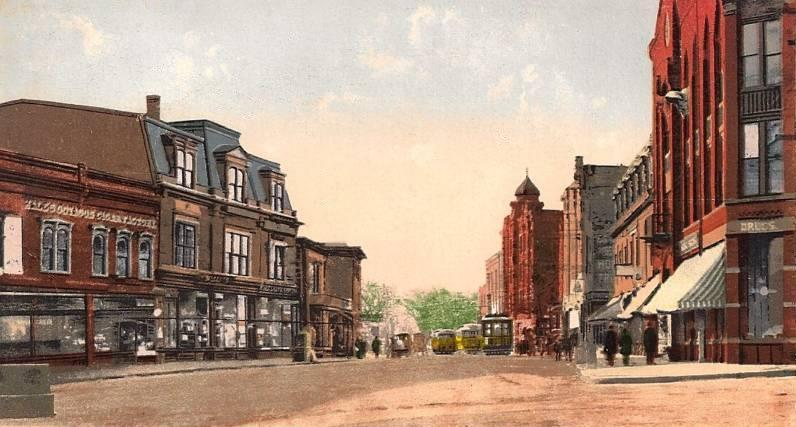
Lincoln Square in 1907

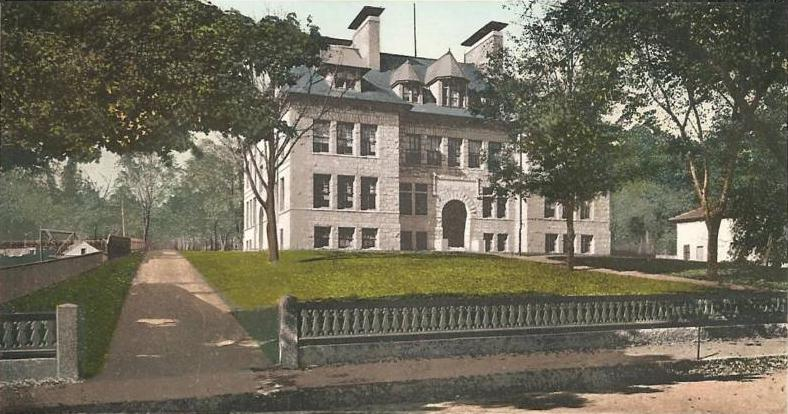
Old High School in 1907

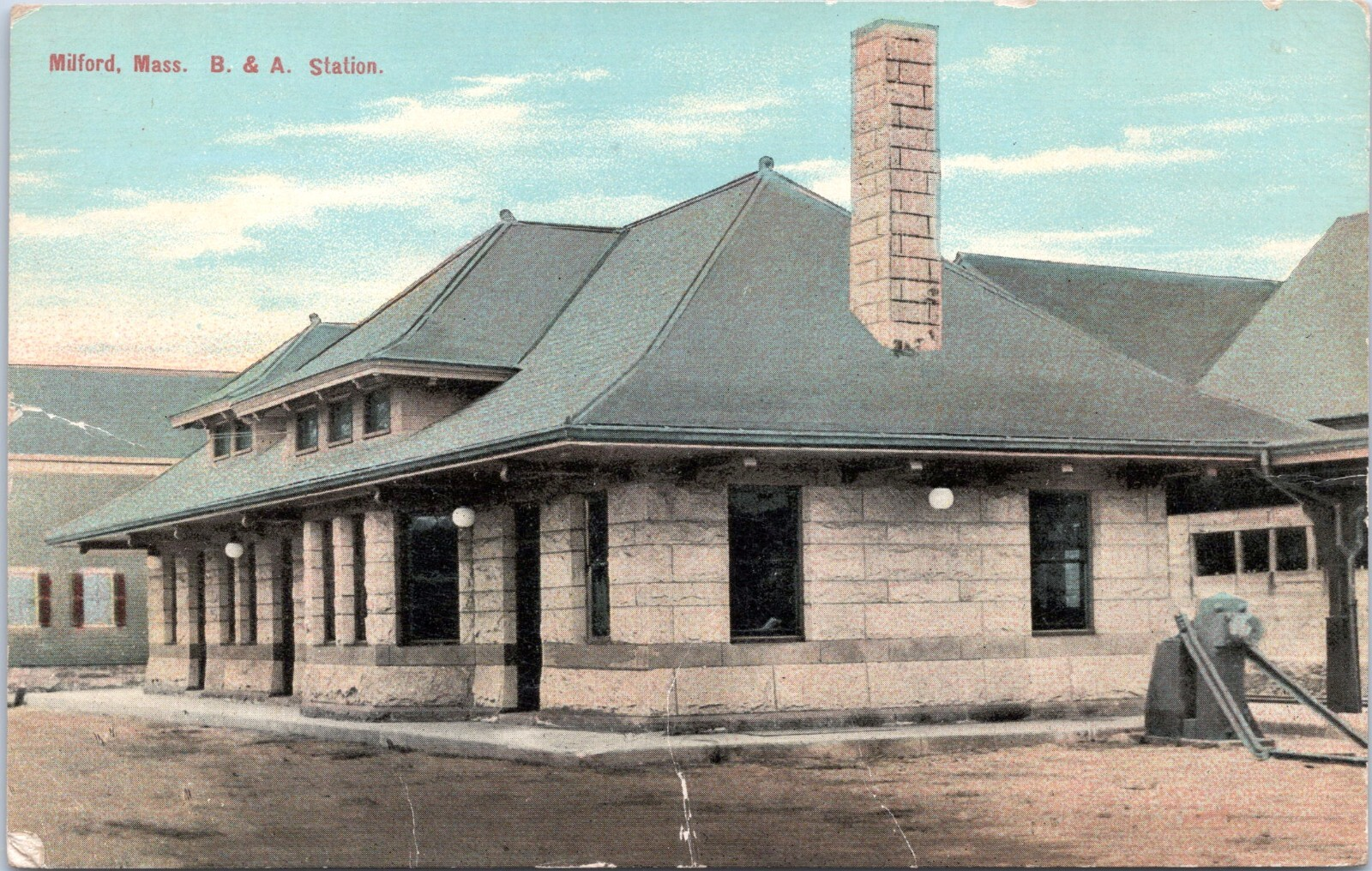
B. & A. Station c. 1913

== See also ==
- List of mill towns in Massachusetts
