= Milford Town Hall =

- U.S. National Register of Historic Places
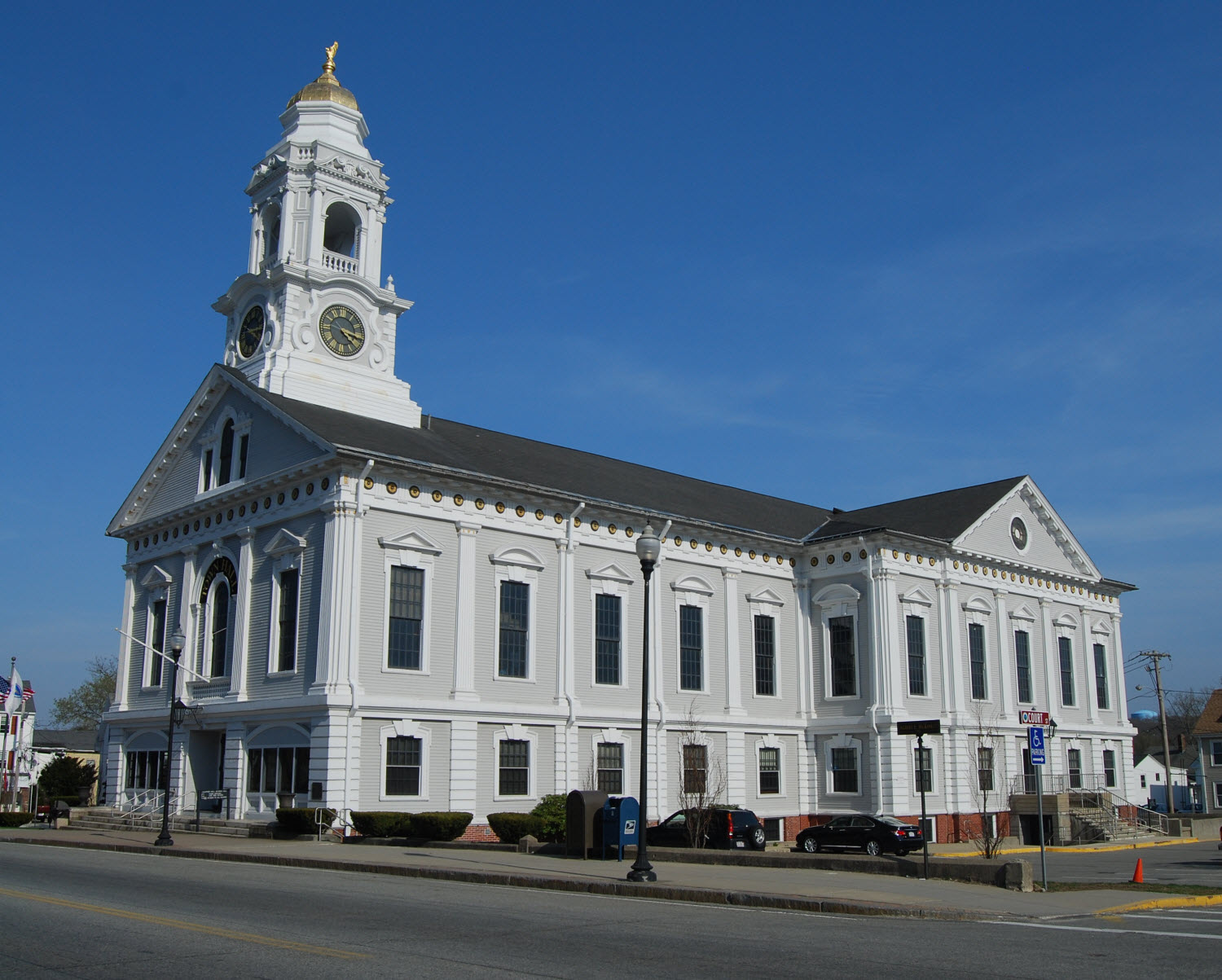

- Location within Massachusetts Location within the United States
- Location: Milford, Massachusetts
- Coordinates: 42°8′33″N 71°31′2″W
- Built: 1853
- Architect: Thomas W. Silloway
- Architectural style: Renaissance
- NRHP reference No.: 77000200
- Added to NRHP: September 22, 1977

Milford Town Hall is the historic town hall at 52 Main Street in Milford, Massachusetts. The two story wood frame building was completed in 1854; in addition to its role in housing town offices for over a century, it is a distinctive local example of Italianate architecture, with pilasters articulating the building bays above a quoined basement level, a modillioned cornice, and alternating gabled and segmented-arch pediments above its windows. It is unusual among Milford's public buildings in not being built out of locally quarried granite.

The building was listed on the National Register of Historic Places in 1977.

== See also ==
- National Register of Historic Places listings in Worcester County, Massachusetts
