= Al Cass =

American trumpeter and instrument maker (1923–1989)

- Also known as: Alfred S. Cassinelli
- Born: Alfred Stephen Cascianelli; September 7, 1923; Milford, Massachusetts, U.S.
- Died: August 23, 1989 (aged 65)
- Genres: Jazz; swing
- Occupations: Musician; Manufacturer; Inventor; Consultant
- Instrument: Trumpet
- Years active: 1940s–1981

Alfred S. Cassinelli (born Alfred Stephen Cascianelli, September 7, 1923 – August 23, 1989), known professionally as Al Cass, was an American inventor, trumpeter, manufacturer, and consultant to other brass musicians.

== Early life ==
Cass was the youngest of nine children (Anna, Isadore, Mary, Louis, Rita, Hellen, Alba, and Concetta) of Italian immigrants who came to America and settled in Milford, Massachusetts, at the turn of the 20th century. Later, the name was changed to "Cassinelli" by an older sibling, a fad of the day to enable other immigrants to spell and pronounce the name more easily. Both parents did not agree to the name change, and thus kept their original last name.

Cass asked his mother for a horn at age 12 after hearing Harry James on the radio.

He was the president of his class at Milford High School in 1941. He had his own orchestra by age 14, performing at proms, weddings, and area clubs, notably the Crystal Room, which was frequented by many touring legends of the day, whom he met and was inspired by.

He entered into World War II as a machine gunner after the Japanese attack on Pearl Harbor, along with his older brothers Isadore and Louis. An older sister, Rita, went to Detroit to work for the war effort. Cass took his trumpet with him and was seen playing. He was immediately transferred into Special Services touring the European theatre, performing for troops who were awaiting the arrival of Hollywood's Andrews Sisters, Bob Hope, and Mickey Rooney, among others. He left service as private first class.

== Career ==
After the war, the re-formed "Al Cass Orchestra" toured the East Coast, befriending fellow bandleaders such as Cab Calloway, Count Basie, Duke Ellington, and Stan Kenton, some of whom Cass had first met at the Crystal Room before World War II. Following an important gig to which members of his orchestra failed to show up, he ended his tour as bandleader and returned home to care for his ailing father Stephano Cascianell (d. 1952), who had been a stonecutter at one of Milford's famous pink granite quarries.

Cass built a workshop in the two-car garage next to his family home and began work on his longtime idea for a mouthpiece that would enable brass musicians to play more than just their declared instrument of choice using the same embouchure. After several years of research and development, he invented "doubling" mouthpieces for brass musicians, which he patented (U.S. patent #2,917,964).

He served as a mouthpiece consultant and as a manufacturer of brass mouthpieces for jazz trumpeter Dizzy Gillespie, among other musicians of the big band era. His clientele includes notables from the jazz generation, such as Louis Armstrong, Roy Eldridge, Harry "Sweets" Edison, Booker Little, Blue Mitchell, Buck Clayton, and Doc Cheatham.

He was the manufacturer and creator of the "FAST" valve/slide/key oil combination for brass instruments, which has been considered the industry standard since inception. It was developed after 18 months of research and development at the request and final approval of Dizzy Gillespie.

== Later personal life ==
In 1980, Cass' mother, Josephine, died at age 99. Cass was told by his own physicians that he had 5% of his liver and just months to live. He purchased a home away from his business and older surviving siblings, and taught his son Stephen (b. 1968) the business. By 1981, he stopped making mouthpieces and left Stephen in control of oil production. He stopped going to his factory on a regular basis to spend more time with his youngest son Joseph (b. 1977). A third son, Alfred the second, was born in 1982. Fearing his death was near, he spent most of his time designing his two youngest sons a backyard in the tradition of Walt Disney.

For several years, up until his death, he was working on a portable water-saving irrigation system for crop production in drought-ridden areas of the world.
