= Memorial Hall (Oakland, Maine) =

- U.S. National Register of Historic Places
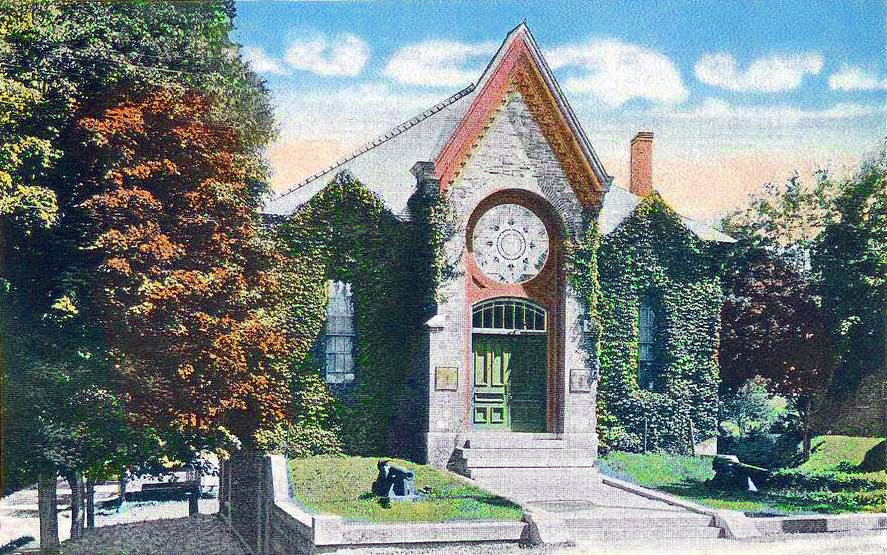
- c. 1920 postcard view

- Location within Maine Location within the United States
- Location: Church St., Oakland, Maine
- Coordinates: 44°32′45″N 69°43′12″W
- Area: 1 acre (0.40 ha)
- Built: 1870
- Architect: Thomas Silloway
- Architectural style: Italian-Gothic
- NRHP reference No.: 77000071
- Added to NRHP: November 23, 1977

Memorial Hall is a historic civic building at Church and West School Streets in Oakland, Maine. It was built in 1870 as a memorial to the community's American Civil War dead. It is a remarkably sophisticated example of Italian-Gothic architecture for a rural community, expensive to build, and was listed on the National Register of Historic Places in 1977.

== Description and history ==
Oakland's Memorial Hall stands in the town's main village, at the southeast corner of Church and West School Streets. It is a single-story masonry structure, built out of stone with brick trim, and covered by a hip roof. A gabled entry projects from its western facade, flanked by tall sash windows in segmented-arch openings, with mini-gables in the roofline above. The entry section has a steeply pitched gable, with a rounded-arch recess housing a stained glass rose window at its top, and a further recessed wide entry below. The corners of the entry projection are buttressed, and the building corners exhibit brick quoining. The interior is divided into an entry foyer and meeting hall.

The hall was built through the efforts of a local Soldiers Memorial Association, and was designed by the noted ecclesiastical architect Thomas Silloway. Construction was begun in 1870, but was not completed until 1873, due to the repeated need to raise funds to continue and then complete construction. (The population of the town was just 1,500 at the time.) The hall was transferred by the Association to the local chapter of the Grand Army of the Republic in 1887, and is now owned by the town. It is an impressive example of Italian-Gothic architecture, unusual for such a small community.

== See also ==
- National Register of Historic Places listings in Kennebec County, Maine
