= Jim Pyne =

American football player and businessman (born 1971)

No. 60, 61, 71, 73
- Positions: Guard, center

Personal information
- Born: November 23, 1971 (age 54); Milford, Massachusetts, U.S.
- Listed height: 6 ft 2 in (1.88 m)
- Listed weight: 297 lb (135 kg)

Career information
- High school: Milford
- College: Virginia Tech
- NFL draft: 1994: 7th round, 200th overall pick
- Expansion draft: 1999: 1st round, 1st overall pick

Career history

Playing
- Tampa Bay Buccaneers (1994–1997); Detroit Lions (1998); Cleveland Browns (1999–2000); Philadelphia Eagles (2001); Indianapolis Colts (2002)*
- * Offseason or practice squad member only

Coaching
- Tampa Bay Buccaneers (2003–2004); New Orleans Saints (2005)

Awards and highlights
- Unanimous All-American (1993); Dudley Award (1993); Virginia Tech Hokies No. 73 retired

Career NFL statistics
- Games played: 81
- Games started: 73
- Fumble recoveries: 1
- Stats at Pro Football Reference

James M. Pyne (born November 23, 1971) is an American former professional football player. He played as a guard and center for nine seasons in the National Football League (NFL). He is the co-founder of Wheels Up and has also served as the chief partnership officer of the Tampa Bay Buccaneers.

Pyne played college football for Virginia Tech, and earned All-American honors. Selected by Tampa Bay in the seventh round of the 1994 NFL draft, he became a reliable starter for the Buccaneers, Detroit Lions, Cleveland Browns and Philadelphia Eagles. After playing in the NFL, Pyne became an assistant coach for the Buccaneers from 2003 to 2004 and for the New Orleans Saints in 2005.

== Early life and education ==
Pyne was born in Milford, Massachusetts. He attended Milford High School and Choate Rosemary Hall in Wallingford, Connecticut, and played high school football for the Milford Scarlet Hawks and the Choate Judges.

== Career ==
=== College football ===
Pyne attended Virginia Polytechnic Institute and State University, and played for the Virginia Tech Hokies football team from 1990 to 1993. As a senior in 1993, he was selected as a unanimous All-American, becoming Virginia Tech's first player ever to do so, and was also awarded the Dudley Award, which is given to the Commonwealth of Virginia's outstanding player of the year. He was a finalist for both the Lombardi Award and the Outland Trophy.

Virginia Tech retired his number 73; it is one of only four football numbers retired by the school in over hundred years of football. He was named to the Big East Conferences All-time team at the turn of the century. The offensive line meeting room at Virginia Tech has been named in his honor. He was also inducted to Virginia Tech's Sports Hall of Fame. He later was named a legend of the ACC.

=== Professional football ===
Pre-draft measurables
Height	Weight	Arm length	Hand span	40-yard dash	10-yard split	20-yard split	20-yard shuttle	Vertical jump	Broad jump	Bench press
6 ft 2 1/8 in (1.88 m)	277 lb (126 kg)	31 in (0.79 m)	9 5/8 in (0.24 m)	5.44 s	1.82 s	3.08 s	4.63 s	29.0 in (0.74 m)	8 ft 8 in (2.64 m)	29 reps
All values from NFL Combine

The Tampa Bay Buccaneers selected Pyne in seventh round (200th pick overall) in the 1994 NFL draft. He played four of his nine professional seasons with the Buccaneers as a left guard, starting in 38 of his 42 appearances from 1995 to 1997.

In 1998, he went to Detroit to play with the Lions and started 16 games at center.

In 1999, he became the first overall pick of the Cleveland Browns in the 1999 expansion draft. In Cleveland he was a starter for two seasons at left guard before injuring his knee. He was named the team MVP by the Akron Browns backers and named the team's top offensive lineman by the touchdown club. He was also elected team captain while with the Browns. He was named three times to Muscle and Fitnesses' NFL all strength team. He finished his career with the NFC East division champion Philadelphia Eagles in 2001.

== Personal life ==
Pyne's father, George Pyne III, played for the Boston Patriots of the American Football League in 1965. Pyne's grandfather, George Pyne II, played for the Providence Steam Roller of the NFL in 1931. The Pynes became the first family to play three generations of professional football.

His brother, George Pyne, has played football at Brown University and is a businessman.
