= Trinity Church (Waltham, Massachusetts) =

Historic church in Massachusetts, United States

- First Congregational Church
- U.S. National Register of Historic Places
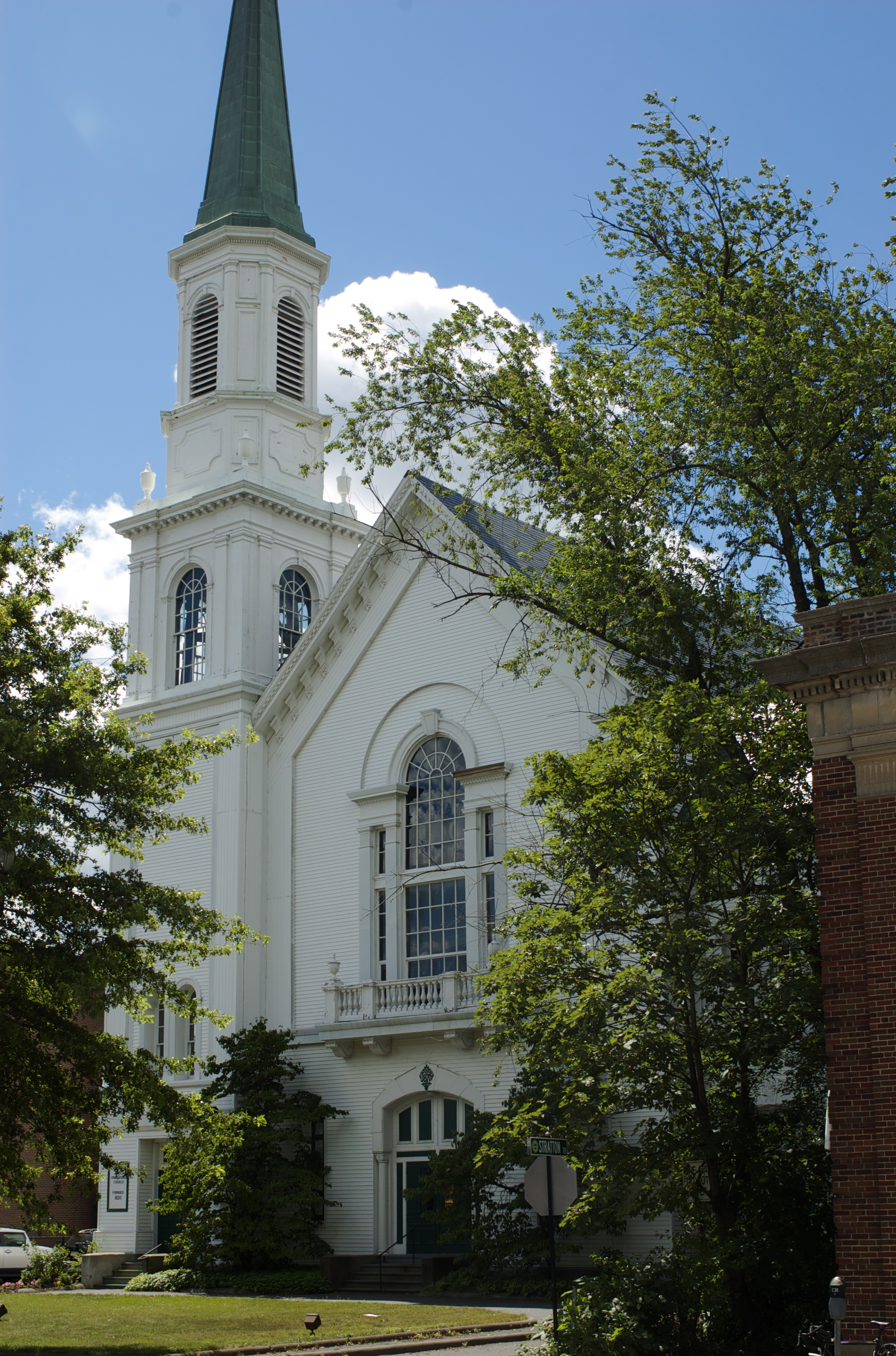

- Location within Massachusetts Location within the United States
- Location: 730 Main Street, Waltham, Massachusetts
- Coordinates: 42°22′32″N 71°14′24″W
- Built: 1870
- Architect: Thomas W. Silloway
- Architectural style: Colonial Revival, Romanesque
- MPS: Waltham MRA
- NRHP reference No.: 89001548
- Added to NRHP: September 28, 1989

The Trinity Church, formerly the First Congregational Church, is a historic church in Waltham, Massachusetts. The present church building, an architecturally distinctive blend of Romanesque and Georgian Revival styling, was built in 1870 for a congregation established in 1820. It was listed on the National Register of Historic Places in 1989.

== Architecture and history ==
The church stands on the south side of Main Street (United States Route 20), one block west of Waltham's Central Square. It is separated from the street by lawn, and stands opposite the Francis Buttrick Library. Its main body is oriented north-south, with a gable roof, and a square tower rising at the northeast corner. The main entrance is set at the base of the main block in a segmented-arch opening, and is topped by a tall Palladian window with balcony. The tower corners are pilastered, and the tower includes a belfry stage with round-arch openings before rising to an octagonal spire. The interior is predominantly Georgian Revival in character, the result of extensive interior and exterior alterations in 1925. The building was built in 1870, and originally had Italianate styling, some of which is still evident in its round-arch windows and bracketed gable.

First Congregational Church was founded in 1820 as a Trinitarian congregation called the Trinitarian Congregational Church, brought about in part by schism from the Second Religious Society, which chose Unitarianism. Its first church was located at Main and Heard Streets. Growth in the congregation prompted construction of this larger structure in 1870 to a design by Boston-based Thomas Silloway. The schism between the two congregations was healed in 1906, and they were reunited as the First Congregational Church. The church was damaged by fire in 1925, while undergoing the renovations that added its Georgian features. It became a member of the United Church of Christ when that body was formed in 1955, but withdrew in 2006 when the congregation "voted to establish itself as an independent, trans-denominational congregation," and changed its name to Trinity Church. Rev. J. Howard Cepelak served as a pastor for 20 years from 1992 to 2012.

== Closure and sale to New Light ==
In December of 2014 First Congregational Church closed its doors. Rev. Allen J. Batchelder. was presiding over the church during the closure. The congregation chose to sell the building to New Light Korean Church a Presbyterian Church. The sale was for $100 along with transfer of related accounts to fund building upkeep and outreach with a deed restriction that the building continue to be used as a Christian house of worship. New Light had been leasing space from First Congregational Church for several years. New Light provides Korean language worship to its community.

== See also ==
- National Register of Historic Places listings in Waltham, Massachusetts
