= Milford High School (Massachusetts) =

Location
- 31 West Fountain Street; Milford, Worcester County, Massachusetts 01757; United States
- 42°9′0″N 71°32′0″W

Information
- Type: Public high school Open enrollment
- Established: 1800s
- Status: Open
- School district: Milford Public Schools
- Superintendent: Kevin McIntyre
- Principal: Joshua Otlin
- Teaching staff: 110.74 (FTE)
- Grades: 9–12
- Gender: Coed
- Age range: 14–19
- Enrollment: 1,316 (2024–2025)
- Average class size: ~30
- Student to teacher ratio: 11.88
- Language: English
- Hours in school day: 7 hours
- Classrooms: 66
- Houses: 2
- Colors: Red, black and white
- Song: Alma Mater
- Fight song: Notre Dame Victory March
- Athletics conference: Hockomock League
- Sports: Basketball, baseball, cheerleading, cross-country, field hockey, football, golf, ice hockey, lacrosse, soccer, softball, swimming and diving, tennis, volleyball, track, indoor track, and wrestling
- Mascot: Scarlet Hawk
- Team name: Scarlet Hawks, Hawks
- Rivals: Leominster High School Shrewsbury High School
- Accreditation: NEASC
- Newspaper: The Scarlet
- Yearbook: Oak, Lily, and Ivy
- Communities served: Town of Milford
- Nobel laureates: Joseph Murray
- Website: mhs.milfordpublicschools.com

Milford High School (MHS) is the secondary school for the district of Milford, Massachusetts, the Milford Public Schools. The Milford High School's principal is Joshua Otlin with William Chaplin.

== School organization ==
The campus of Milford High School sits on 25 acres (100,000 m^{2}) of land at 31 West Fountain Street in Milford, Massachusetts. The current building was opened in 1973 after plots of land were donated by the Bandy Family in Milford. The school has a football field with home and away team seating, football practice field, softball field, soccer fields, twenty-five yard swimming pool with springboard diving board, full theater, and a roughly 750-spot parking lot.

It is an SAT, PSAT, and ACT testing center, providing students, both resident and out-of-town, a place to take the required tests.

Since 2024, measures have been taken to provide students with the highest level of security available: school-wide security cameras and lobby sign-in kiosks have been added, as well as a juvenile Milford police officer present.

=== Houses ===
The school is divided into two "houses," A and B. Currently, a student's grade determines their house. The House A office is located on the main level off of the A-wing and next to the Milford Community School Use Office. The House A office is where the Freshman and Juniors would go for help. The House B office is on the second floor right off of the A-wing and located directly above the House A office. The House B office is where the Sophomores and Seniors would go for help.

=== Wings ===
The Milford High School building has six wings, named A-F.

==== A-Wing ====
The A-Wing is the main instructional area of the school. It houses the majority of math classes, English classes, and history classes. Government classes are also taught here.

==== B-Wing ====
The B-Wing is the school's main information center. It includes the school's library/ media center, headed by Dr. Nicholas Molinari; video production center, run by Mr. Jeremy Folster; professional library; teacher's resource center; faculty lounge; principal's office; reading department; and a few classrooms.

==== C-Wing ====
The C-Wing houses the majority of all science classes on the lower floor. Its upper floor contains the foreign language department which offers Spanish, Portuguese, Italian, and French. The C-Wing also houses the Department of Grants, Media, and Technology for the Milford Public Schools.

==== D-Wing ====
The D-Wing is the main technology wing of the school. Computer Science, Photography, and other technologies are located here. A special education room includes the Scarlet Bistro, providing gourmet food for the faculty.

==== E-Wing ====
The E-Wing contains the performing and fine arts areas. This includes the David I. Davoren auditorium, a 750-seat "almost" full theatre, complete with wings, wing-rooms, a catwalk, tech booth, and full lighting and sound capabilities. Also in the E-Wing are two music rooms, vocal and instrumental; three practice rooms; and the department office and music library. The music department conducts regular classes in music theory and instrumental techniques as well as producing performance groups such as the marching and concert bands, jazz band, and chorus. In addition, E-Wing houses the art room, business rooms, and programs offering food preparation, parenting, and the child care program. Lastly, the E-Wing contains the Hawk's Nest, the school store that is run by the school's special education students during lunch in order to give them experience in dealing with other people.

==== F-Wing ====
The F-Wing is home to the physical education department. The approximately 1,000-seat gymnasium, dance, wrestling, and weight training rooms, and swimming pool with one-meter diving board are used throughout the day. The recently renovated practice field is in constant use, both during and after school hours. These offerings give students a wide variety of physical education classes as well as exemplary facilities in which sporting events take place. As can be seen by the award banners in the gymnasium, MHS takes great pride in its athletic program at the instructional, intramural, and interscholastic levels.

=== Central Administration Office ===
The Central Administration Office for the Milford Public Schools is located in the MHS building, in the front, off of the C-Wing. All district-level administrators' offices are located here. Offices located here include those of the Superintendent, Assistant Superintendent, and Business Manager, as well as their respective secretaries.

== Academics ==
Milford High School's traditional courses range from college preparatory and honors classes to more challenging Advanced Placement courses. Non-traditional courses range from video production and computer systems technology to graphic design, robotics and automation, and food service management.

=== Graduation requirements ===
The graduation requirements for the classes of 2014, 2015 and 2016 were as follows:

- English language arts – 22.5 credits
- Mathematics – 20 credits
- History and social sciences – 18 credits
- Science and technology – 15 credits
- Foreign language – 10 credits
- Practical/fine arts – 10 credits
- Physical education – 10 credits
- Health – 5 credits
- Electives – 19.5 credits
- Total – 130 credits

The graduation requirements for the class of 2017 were as follows:

- English language arts – 24 credits
- Mathematics – 24 credits
- History and social sciences – 21 credits
- Science and technology – 18 credits
- Foreign language – 12 credits
- Practical/fine arts – 9 credits
- Physical education – 6 credits
- Health – 3 credits
- Electives – 23 credits
- Total – 140 credits

The graduation requirements for the class of 2026 are as follows:

- English Language Arts – 24 credits (4 years)
- Mathematics – 24 credits (4 years)
- History and Social Sciences – 21 credits (3.5 years)
- Science – 18 credits (3 years)
- Foreign Languages – 12 credits (2 years)
- Practical/Fine Arts – 12 credits (4 classes)
- Physical Education – 9 credits (4 classes)
- Health – 3 credits (2 classes)
- Total – 130 credits (minimum)

There are also required credits by the end of each year. The amount a student needs for each year is:

- Freshman year: 20 credits
- Sophomore year: 60 credits
- Junior year: 100 credits
- Senior year: 140 credits

However, more credits are recommended each year.

== Notable alumni ==
- Norm Abram, carpenter, writer, and television
- Al Cass, musician and inventor
- Chris Colabello, Major League Baseball player
- Vincent Connare, font designer
- Paul Coyne, film editor and producer
- Greg Dickerson, Boston sportscaster
- Brian Fair, heavy metal musician
- Art Kenney, Major League Baseball player
- Charles Laquidara, radio disc jockey
- Howie Long, football player and actor
- Ralph Lumenti, Major League Baseball player
- Joseph Murray, Nobel Prize–winning surgeon
- George Pyne II, football player
- George Pyne III, football player
- Jim Pyne, football player
- Rich Gotham, Boston Celtics team president
