= George Pyne II =

American football player (1909–1974)

George Pyne
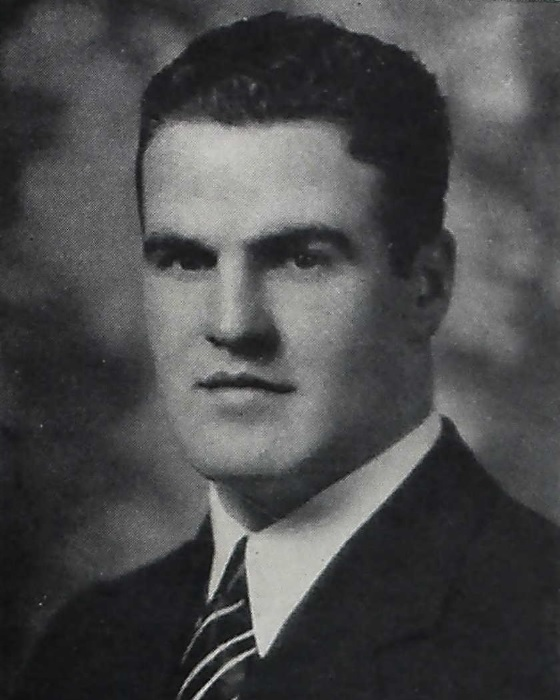
- College yearbook portrait, 1931
- Born: George Francis Pyne Jr. October 17, 1909; Marlborough, Massachusetts, U.S.
- Died: June 3, 1974 (aged 64); Milford, Massachusetts, U.S.
- Education: College of the Holy Cross (PhB)
- Spouse: Florence Mainini
- Children: 3, including George
- Football career

No. 31
- Position: Tackle

Personal information
- Listed height: 5 ft 11 in (1.80 m)
- Listed weight: 218 lb (99 kg)

Career information
- High school: Milford (Massachusetts)
- College: Holy Cross

Career history
- Providence Steam Roller (1931)
- Stats at Pro Football Reference

George Francis Pyne Jr. (October 17, 1909 – June 3, 1974) was an American football tackle who played one season with the Providence Steam Roller of the National Football League (NFL). He played college football at the College of the Holy Cross.

== Early life and college ==
George Francis Pyne Jr. was born on October 17, 1909, in Marlborough, Massachusetts. He attended Milford High School in Milford, Massachusetts.

Pyne played college football for the Holy Cross Crusaders of the College of the Holy Cross. He was on the freshman team in 1927 and was a three-year letterman from 1928 to 1930.

== Professional career ==
Pyne played in two games, starting one, for the Providence Steam Roller of the National Football League in 1931. He wore jersey number 31 while with the Steam Roller. He stood 5'11" and weighed 218 pounds.

== Personal life ==
Pyne'a son, George Pyne III, played in the AFL and his grandson, Jim Pyne, played in the NFL. The Pynes were the first family to have three generations play professional football. One of his two daughters, Claudina, was married to politician Robert H. Quinn, who served as Massachusetts's state house speaker and attorney general. His grandson, George IV, played football at Brown University and is a businessman. Pyne died on June 3, 1974, in Milford.
