= Roslindale Baptist Church =

Historic church in Massachusetts, United States

- U.S. National Register of Historic Places
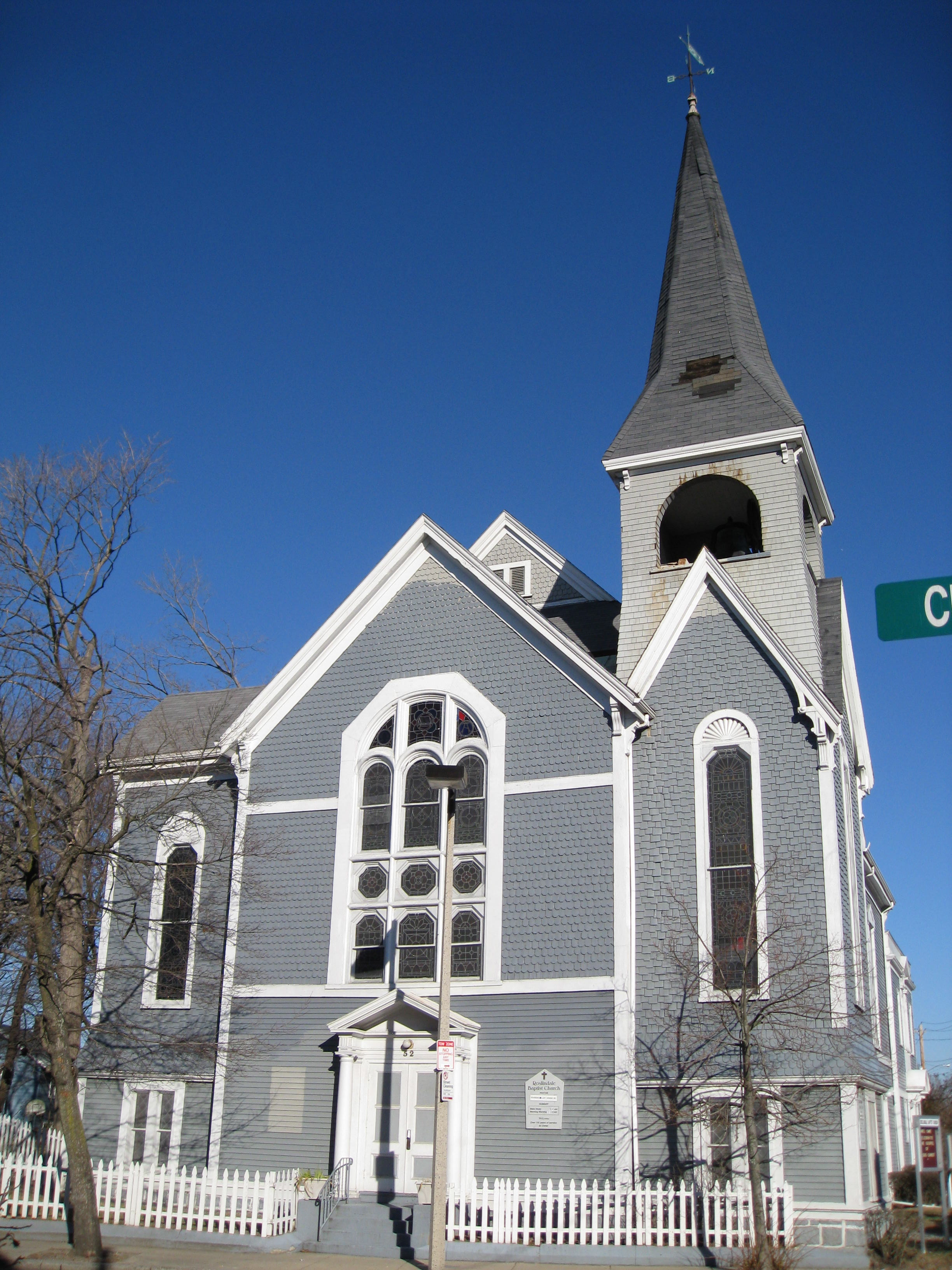

- Location within Massachusetts Location within the United States
- Location: Boston, Massachusetts
- Coordinates: 42°17′7″N 71°7′41″W
- Area: less than one acre
- Built: 1884
- Architect: Silloway, Thomas; et al.
- Architectural style: Stick/Eastlake
- NRHP reference No.: 98001330
- Added to NRHP: November 05, 1998

Roslindale Baptist Church is an historic Baptist church at 52 Cummins Highway in the Roslindale neighborhood of Boston, Massachusetts. The church was designed by Thomas Silloway in a Stick-Eastlake style, and built in 1884. It is one of the best-preserved Stick style buildings in Roslindale, with decorative shingles and applied woodwork. The congregation was organized in 1875, and met in a meeting hall (no longer standing) prior to the construction of this building.

The church was listed on the National Register of Historic Places in 1998.

== See also ==
- National Register of Historic Places listings in southern Boston, Massachusetts
