= Milford Public Schools =

Public school system serving Milford, Massachusetts

Milford Public Schools is the public school district in Milford, Massachusetts, United States. As of 2025, Craig Consigli is the superintendent of schools. The school committee includes a chairperson, a vice chairperson, and five members.

== History ==
In 1997, members of the school system created and promoted a program where schoolchildren interact with senior citizens. In 2007, the school district placed all of its schools in a curriculum audit, due to the growing immigrant population from Brazil and Ecuador.

== Schools ==
Secondary:

- Milford High School (MHS) (9-12)
- Stacy Middle School (SMS) (6-8)

Primary:

- Brookside Elementary School (K-2)
- Memorial Elementary School (K-2)
- Woodland Elementary School (3-5)

Pre-school:

- Shining Star Early Childhood Center (SSECC)

== Athletics ==
- Milford High School provides 21 athletic teams throughout the Spring, Fall, and Winter seasons.
- Sports played in the Spring: baseball, softball, lacrosse, tennis, track, and volleyball.
- Sports played in the Fall: football, cheering, cross country, field hockey, golf, soccer, and volleyball.
- Sports played in the Winter: Alpine Skiing, basketball, cheering, ice hockey, indoor track, swimming, weightlifting, and wrestling.
