= Gillon Block =

- U.S. National Register of Historic Places
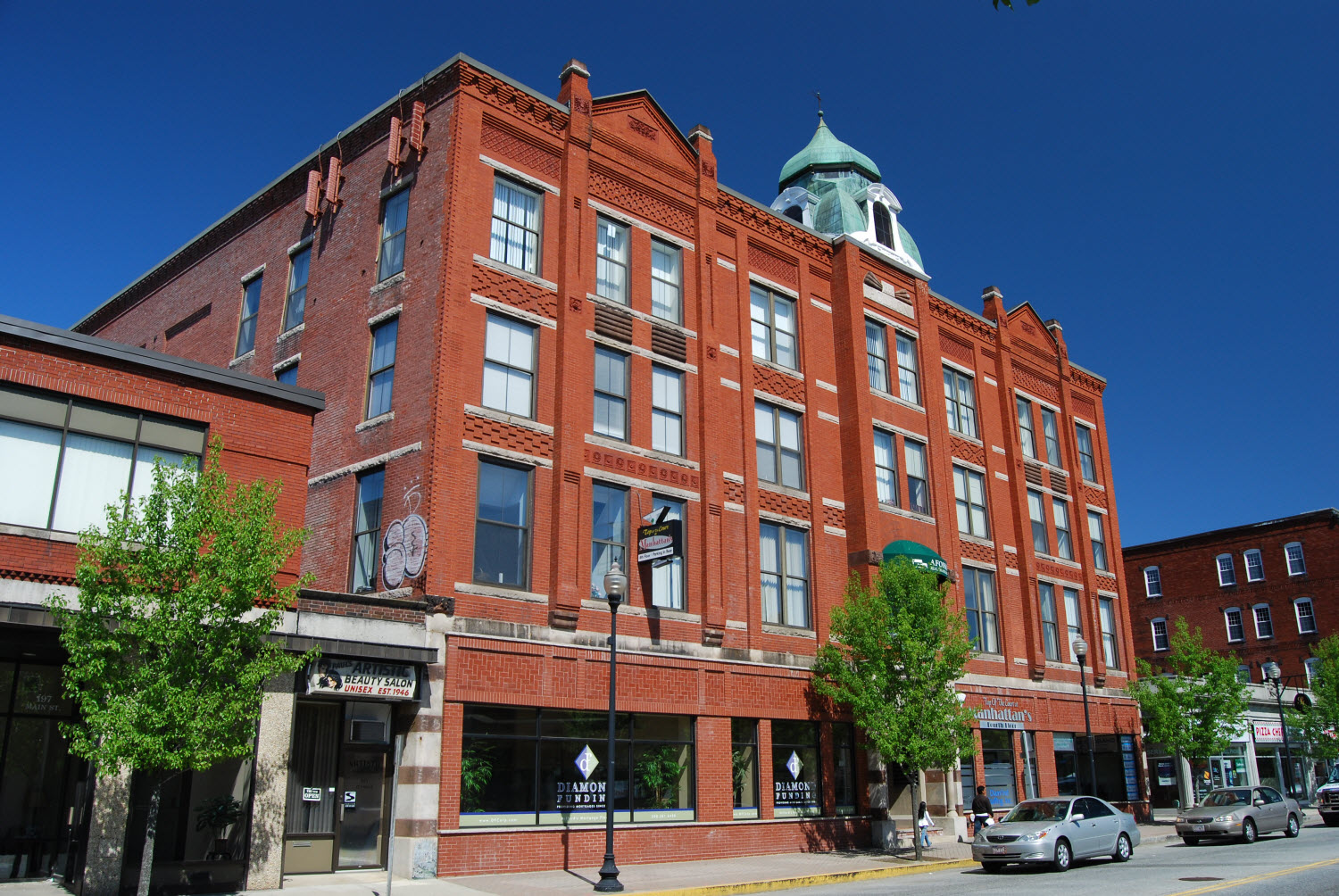

- Location within Massachusetts Location within the United States
- Location: Milford, Massachusetts
- Coordinates: 42°8′26″N 71°31′15″W
- Built: 1888
- Architect: Carey, Rinaldo
- Architectural style: Late Victorian
- NRHP reference No.: 82000488
- Added to NRHP: October 21, 1982

Gillon Block is an historic commercial building at 189 Main Street in Milford, Massachusetts. The four story brick building was built in 1888 by Patrick Gillon, the owner of a bottle manufacturing company. It has a complex facade, divided into seven sections, with a central projecting section topped by a tower with a coppered onion dome. Matching sections at the center sections of the three on either side are articulated by piers and topped by gabled parapets. The building houses stores on the first floor and offices on the upper floors.

The block was listed on the National Register of Historic Places in 1982.

== See also ==
- National Register of Historic Places listings in Worcester County, Massachusetts
