= Ted's Diner =

- U.S. National Register of Historic Places
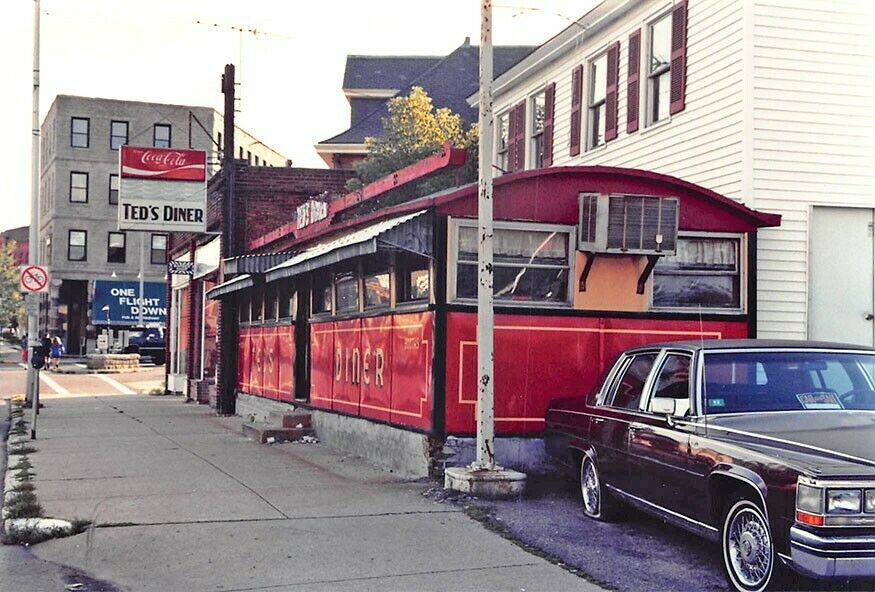
- Undated photo of Ted's Diner

- Location within Massachusetts Location within the United States
- Location: Milford, Massachusetts
- Coordinates: 42°8′34″N 71°31′5″W
- Architect: O'Mahoney, Jerry, Inc.
- MPS: Diners of Massachusetts MPS
- NRHP reference No.: 00001395
- Added to NRHP: November 29, 2000

Ted's Diner was a historic diner at 67 Main Street in Milford, Massachusetts.

== History ==
Ted's Diner was manufactured by the Tierney Diner company in the 1920s and was, until its demise, the oldest of its make in the country. It was also unusual in the state as a double-width diner, and was grafted onto an adjacent late 19th-century house, which provided additional seating capacity.

Ted's was removed to make way for the expansion of Milford's firehouse. After sitting in a parking lot for almost a year, vandals and weather had taken their toll, and Ted's was finally demolished.

The diner was added to the National Register of Historic Places in 2000.

== See also ==
- National Register of Historic Places listings in Worcester County, Massachusetts
