= Memorial Building =

Memorial Building may refer to:

== Canada ==
- East and West Memorial Buildings, Ottawa

== Malta ==
- Church of St Anne, Fort St Elmo, Valletta

== United States ==
Places on the National Register of Historic Places

- Memorial Building (Dyersville, Iowa)
- Memorial Building (Topeka, Kansas)
- Memorial Building (Ironwood, Michigan)
