= George Pyne (business executive) =

American business executive (born 1965)

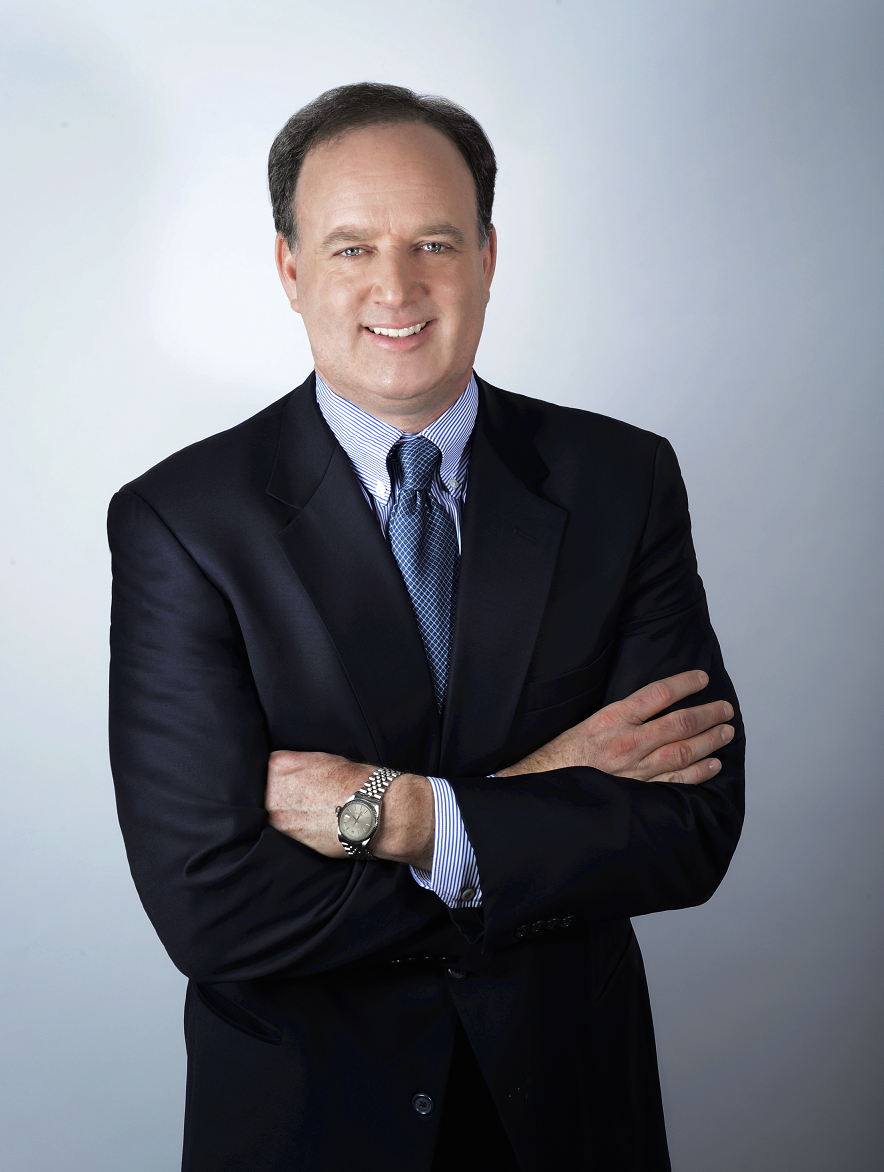
- Pyne in 2014
- Born: George Francis Pyne IV; September 2, 1965 (age 61); Milford, Massachusetts, U.S.
- Education: Brown University
- Occupation: Founder of Bruin Capital
- Spouse: Helene Pyne
- Children: 4, including Drew
- Father: George Pyne III
- Website: Official biography

George Francis Pyne IV (born September 2, 1965) is an American business executive and founder of Bruin Capital, where he is CEO. Pyne is also Non-Executive Chairman of Courtside Ventures which specializes in early stage sports, media and technology investments. Previously, Pyne was the President of IMG Sports and Entertainment and a board member. Prior to IMG, he was Chief Operating Officer and on the Board of NASCAR.

As of 2022, Bruin Capital has made 27 deals in the fields of sports and media with a total approximate equity value of $3 billion. NFL Commissioner Roger Goodell has described Pyne as "one of the most influential figures in global sports and entertainment the past 30 years.

== Early life and education ==
Pyne grew up in Milford, Massachusetts and after graduating Choate Rosemary Hall, attended Brown University, where he played football for the Brown Bears and majored in Political Science. While at Brown, he earned All-Ivy League and All-New England honors and was the team's captain.

== Early career ==
After graduating from Brown, Pyne worked for his family's real estate company in New England, before moving to Atlanta, Georgia to work with the Atlanta Chamber of Commerce. As a part of this work Pyne analyzed the fiscal operations and budget of the Atlanta Public School system and issued a report which led to school reforms. One of the local business leaders that worked with Pyne on the school report was the president of the Portman Cos, who subsequently hired Pyne to work for the commercial real estate and trade show company. There Pyne led the team that oversaw a $2 billion debt restructuring. He also turned commercial space owned by Portman into a corporate hospitality environment for the 1994 Super Bowl XXVIII. Following the event, he created AMC Events to manage and market sports related properties, with Pyne being executive director of the division. One of his early clients for AMC Events was NASCAR, whom he would later join.

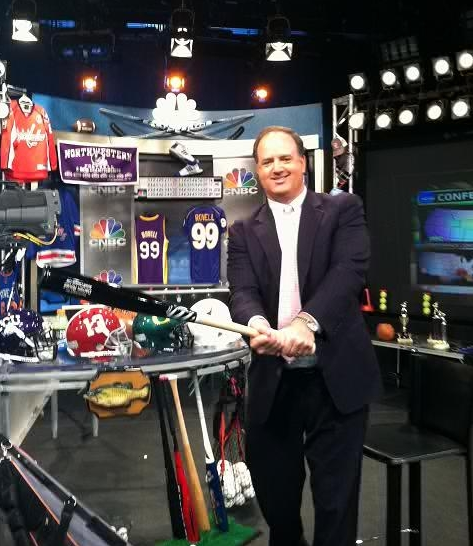
George Pyne

== NASCAR ==
In 1995, he joined NASCAR as head of new business development. He later became Chief Operating Officer and the second non-family member in 50 years to join its board of directors. At NASCAR he negotiated a $4.5 billion television rights deal in 2005, the $750 million sponsorship of the NASCAR Nextel Cup Series in 2004, investments by Fortune 500 companies, and the creation of a $2 billion licensing business.

== IMG ==
Pyne began working with IMG in 2006, as president of sports and entertainment and board member. There he oversaw client management, college sports, consulting, IMG Performance (IMG Academy), licensing and U.S. business development. IMG was later sold to William Morris Endeavor in 2014 for $2.4 billion, after which Pyne left the company.

== Bruin Capital ==
In January 2015 Pyne founded Bruin Sports Capital with a $250 million investment that came from investors including Dan Gilbert, Nassef Sawiris and WPP. Companies Pyne owns a stake in through Bruin Capital include Engine Shop, Soulsight, Oddschecker, OverTier, Full Swing and TGI Sport. Bruin Capital previously owned On Location Experiences and Deltatre, selling the former to Endeavor in 2020 and the latter to Bain Capital and Nextalia in 2022. In 2019 the company raised a further $600 million from CVC Capital Partners and The Jordan Company.

In April 2021, the company changed its name to Bruin Capital.

== Recognition ==
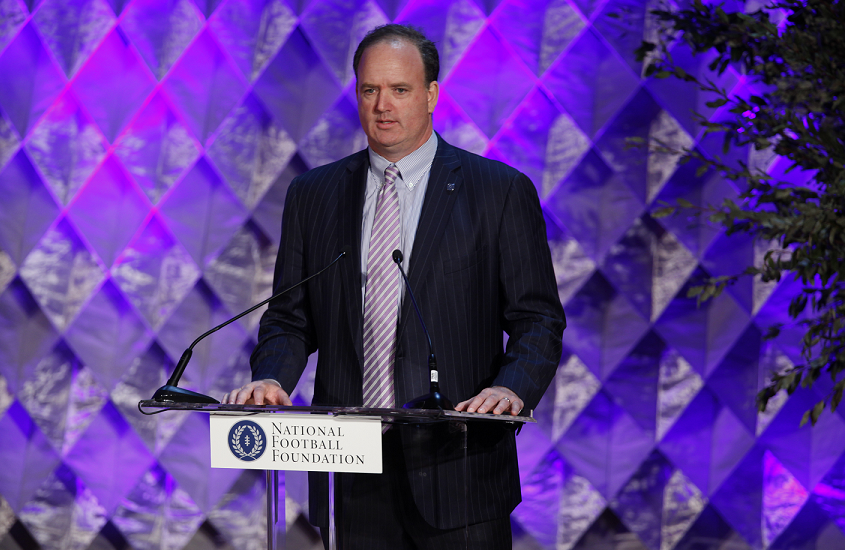
George Pyne speaking at the National Football Foundation Hall of Fame.

Pyne is a member of both the National Football Foundation's Leadership Hall of Fame as well as the Sports Business Journal's Hall of Fame. Pyne was a recipient of the 2014 NCAA Silver Anniversary Award. In 2015 he received a lifetime achievement award from the Ivy League Football Association. Pyne is on the board of the National Football Foundation and the National Catholic Charities for the Archdiocese of New York.

== Personal life ==
Pyne comes from a family of athletes who have played in the National Football League. His father, George Pyne III, played for the Boston Patriots (predecessor to the New England Patriots) of the American Football League in 1965. His grandfather, George Pyne II, played for the Providence Steam Roller of the NFL in 1931. His brother, Jim Pyne, also played in the NFL from 1994 to 2001, making the Pynes the first family to play three generations of professional football. Additionally, Pyne's father-in-law, Paul Harney, was an American professional golfer who won six PGA Tour events, finished in the top eight at the Masters four times and was inducted into the PGA Golf Professional Hall of Fame.

George Pyne is married to Helene Pyne; they have two sons and two daughters. Pyne's sons are college football players; his youngest son Drew Pyne played for Notre Dame and is currently the backup quarterback for the University of Missouri.
