= Memorial Hall station =

Memorial Hall station could refer to:

- Memorial Hall station (PAAC), a light rail station in Pittsburgh, Pennsylvania
- Chiang Kai-shek Memorial Hall MRT station, a rapid transit station in Taipei
- Sun Yat-sen Memorial Hall MRT station, a rapid transit station in Taipei
- Sun Yat-sen Memorial Hall station (Guangzhou Metro), a rapid transit station in Guangzhou
