= Memorial Hall (University of Massachusetts Amherst) =

Building at the University of Massachusetts Amherst

Coordinates: 42.38842°N 72.52759°W

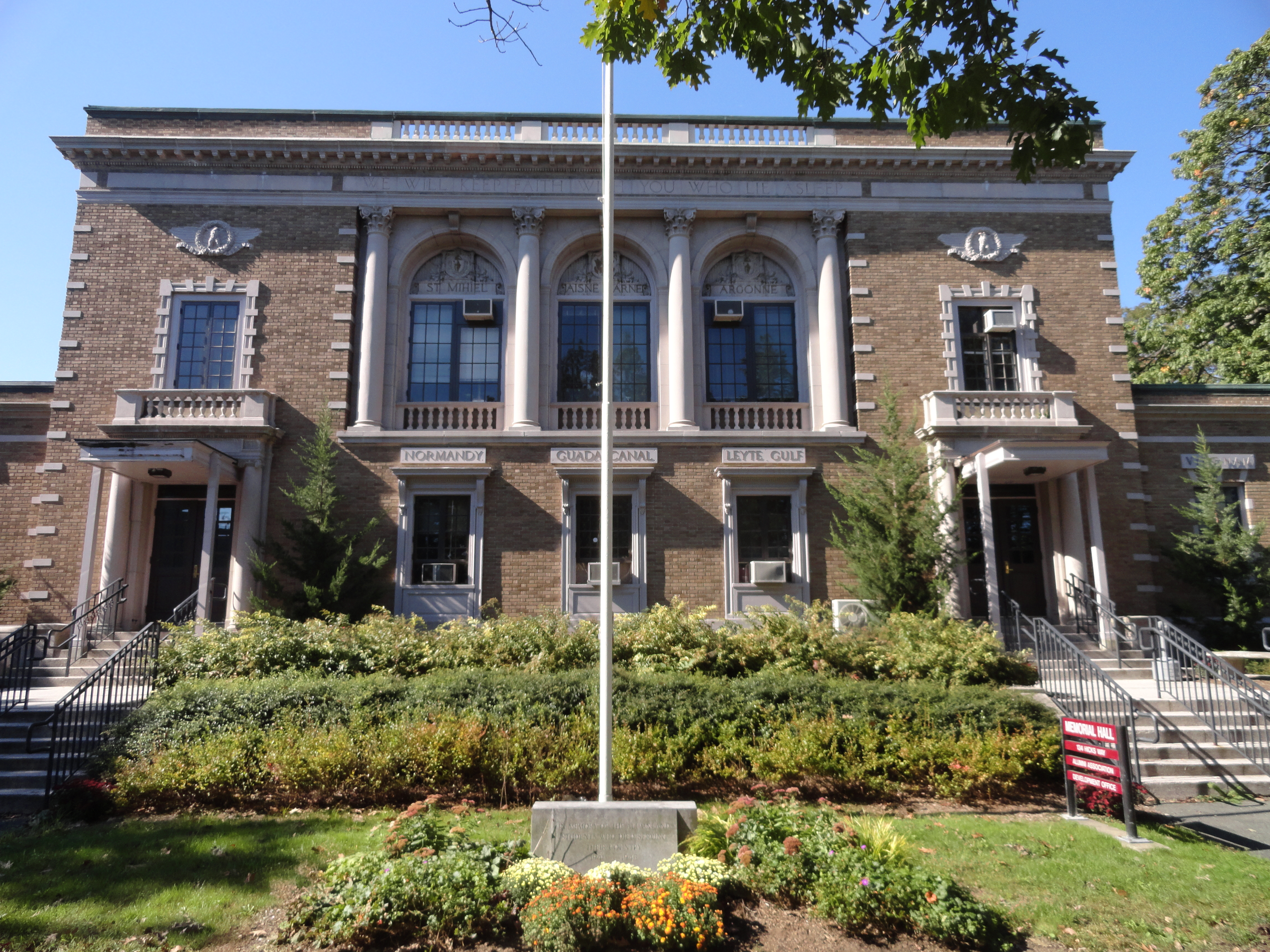
Memorial Hall as viewed from the UMass campus pond, circa 2018

After the global tragedy of World War I, alumni of the University of Massachusetts Amherst who had served in the military arranged a fund to construct a building honoring the sacrifice of their 51 fallen colleagues. The building, located centrally on the university campus next to the Campus Pond, Old Chapel (Amherst, Massachusetts), and W. E. B. Du Bois Library currently serves as the home to the University of Massachusetts Amherst Alumni Association and members of the Campus Development office. A 2009 report recommended addition of Memorial Hall to the state's list of historical places.

== History ==
The building was planned beginning in 1918, and construction finished in 1921. The foyer was initially used for formal services and display of the honored dead. A motto engraved into the inside reads "we will keep faith with you who lie asleep", a reference to the desire to keep student life active in the facility. One prominent visitor was former general and then-President Dwight D. Eisenhower, who toured it in the mid-1950s. The Hall was a staging ground for anti-war protests against the Vietnam War in the mid-1960s.

In 1998, ownership of the Hall transferred from the Alumni Association to the university. Since this time, the building has been a site for weddings, concerts by the University of Massachusetts Minuteman Marching Band, Reserve Officers' Training Corps training exercises and Memorial Day services, art exhibits, and funerals. For a time in the mid-1970s, the Hall hosted the editorial offices for the Massachusetts Review.

=== Architectural Details ===
Architect James Ritchie wished to construct "...a monumental design which will differentiate [Memorial Hall] from the buildings dedicated to instruction." The building is two stories high, with high vaulted arched windows over a central French door, evoking the style of a crypt or museum. Various architectural elements, such as its sandstone trim and matching balustrades at each level, were inspired by the Italian Renaissance. It has two low-slung wings, which serve as Boardrooms and conference spaces.

=== Centennial Celebration ===
After transformation across the years, from use as a ballroom, a billiards hall, a bowling alley, and a home for the University's student alumni association's dialing center, Memorial Hall fell into disrepair and was shuttered in mid-2019. However, as the 100th anniversary in 2020 drew closer, efforts to rehabilitate and reclaim the building as a showpiece for center campus resumed among multiple campus stakeholders.
