= Confederate Memorial Hall (disambiguation) =

Confederate Memorial Hall may mean:

- Confederate Memorial Hall, a former museum, library, and social club located at 1322 Vermont Avenue, Washington, D.C.; it called itself "the Confederate Embassy"
- Confederate Memorial Hall Museum, a museum in New Orleans
- Memorial Hall, Vanderbilt University, a former Confederate Memorial Hall on the Vanderbilt University campus in Nashville, Tennessee, USA
