= George Pyne III =

American football player (1941–2015)

George Pyne
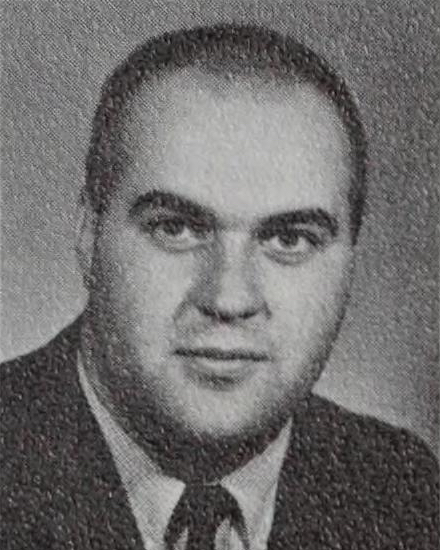
- College yearbook portrait, 1964
- Born: George Francis Pyne III; July 12, 1941; Milford, Massachusetts, U.S.
- Died: November 26, 2015 (aged 74); Milford, Massachusetts, U.S.
- Education: Olivet College (BA)
- Spouse: Roseleen Houton
- Children: 4, including George and Jim
- Father: George Pyne II
- Football career

No. 75
- Position: Defensive tackle

Personal information
- Listed height: 6 ft 5 in (1.96 m)
- Listed weight: 290 lb (132 kg)

Career information
- High school: Milford (MA)
- College: Olivet
- AFL draft: 1965: 16th round, 127 (by the Boston Patriots)th overall pick

Career history
- Boston Patriots (1965)

Awards and highlights
- Olivet College Athletic Hall of Fame (1983)
- Stats at Pro Football Reference

George Francis Pyne III (July 12, 1941 – November 26, 2015) was an American football defensive tackle who played one season with the Boston Patriots of the American Football League (AFL).

== Early life and family ==
=== Childhood and school years ===
Pyne was born on July 12, 1941 in Milford, Massachusetts. His father, George Pyne II, played college football at Holy Cross and, briefly, played professionally as a member of the National Football League's Providence Steamrollers. Pyne attended Milford High School, followed by Olivet College in Olivet, Michigan, where he was a standout defensive player on the school's football team.

=== Marriage and children ===
Pyne was married to the former Roseleen Houton. The couple had four children, including sons George IV and Jim. George played football at Brown University before embarking on a business career, and Jim played for Virginia Tech before being drafted into the NFL. The Pynes were the first family to have three generations play professional football.

== Professional football ==
Pyne was drafted by the Boston Patriots in the sixteenth round of the 1965 AFL draft.

== Later life and death ==
Pyne died on November 26, 2015, from cancer.
