= Memorial Building (Dyersville, Iowa) =

- U.S. National Register of Historic Places
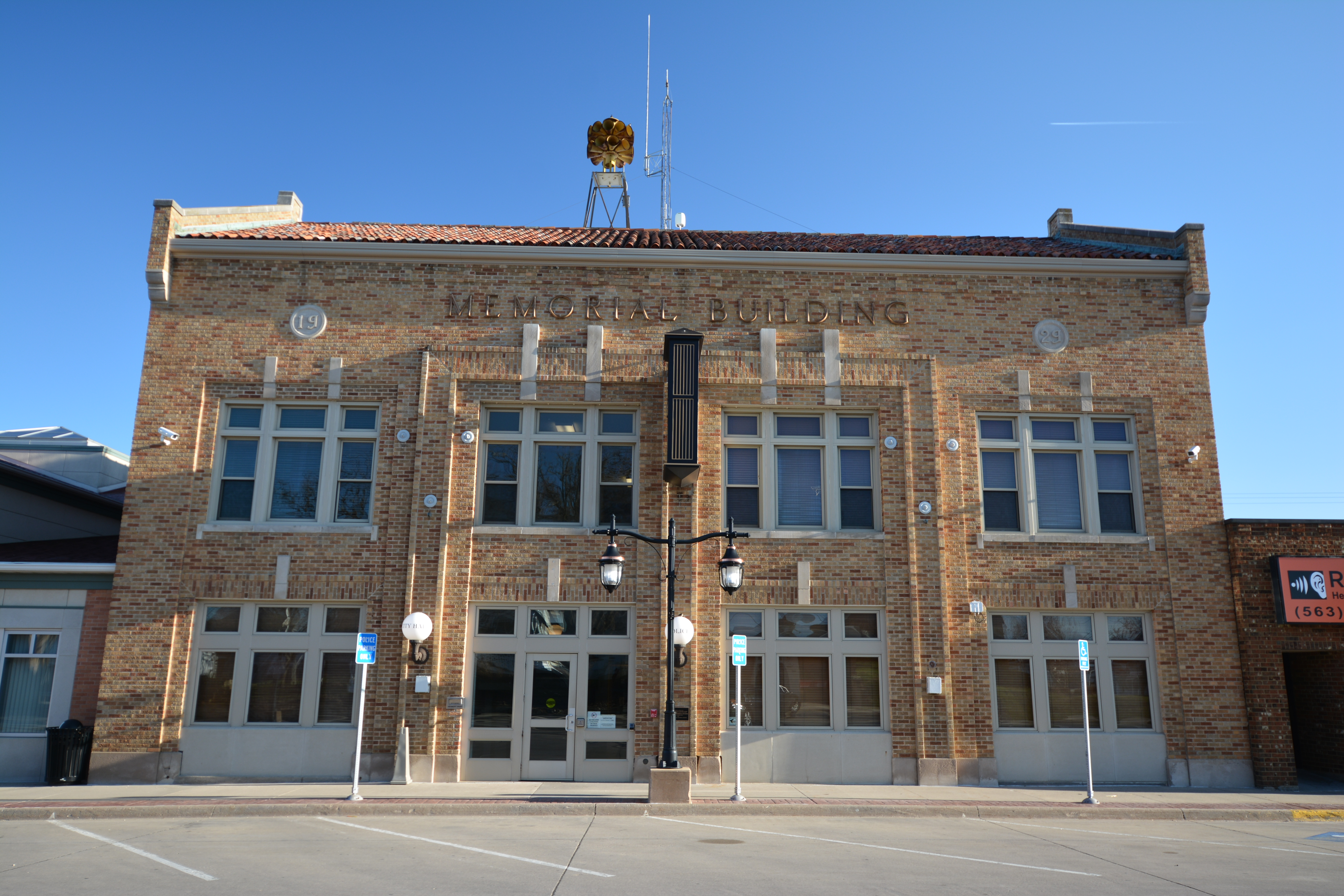

- Location within Iowa Location within the United States
- Location: 340 1st Ave., E. Dyersville, Iowa
- Coordinates: 42°29′05.4″N 91°07′14.4″W
- Area: 1.41 acres (0.57 ha)
- Built: 1929
- Built by: Raymond Klass
- Architect: Ralston & Ralston
- Architectural style: Colonial Revival
- NRHP reference No.: 13000148
- Added to NRHP: April 9, 2013

Memorial Building, also known as Dyersville City Hall, is a historic building located in Dyersville, Iowa, United States. When this structure was completed in 1929 it housed the following functions: police department, fire department, municipal offices, post office, library, community hall, and gymnasium. It replaced the 1893 city hall at the same location that housed all those functions except the library and gymnasium. Its function as a veteran's memorial was overseen by the American Legion, which also was initially located here. The Legion, fire station and post office have subsequently relocated to other facilities. The previous city hall had been damaged in a fire in 1928. The Waterloo, Iowa architectural firm of Ralston and Ralston designed the two-story brick Colonial Revival style building to replace it. Raymond Klass of Louisburg, Wisconsin was the contractor who built the new structure. The building was completed on December 12, 1929, for just over $40,000. It was listed on the National Register of Historic Places in 2013.
