= Circleville Memorial Hall =

- Memorial Hall
- U.S. National Register of Historic Places
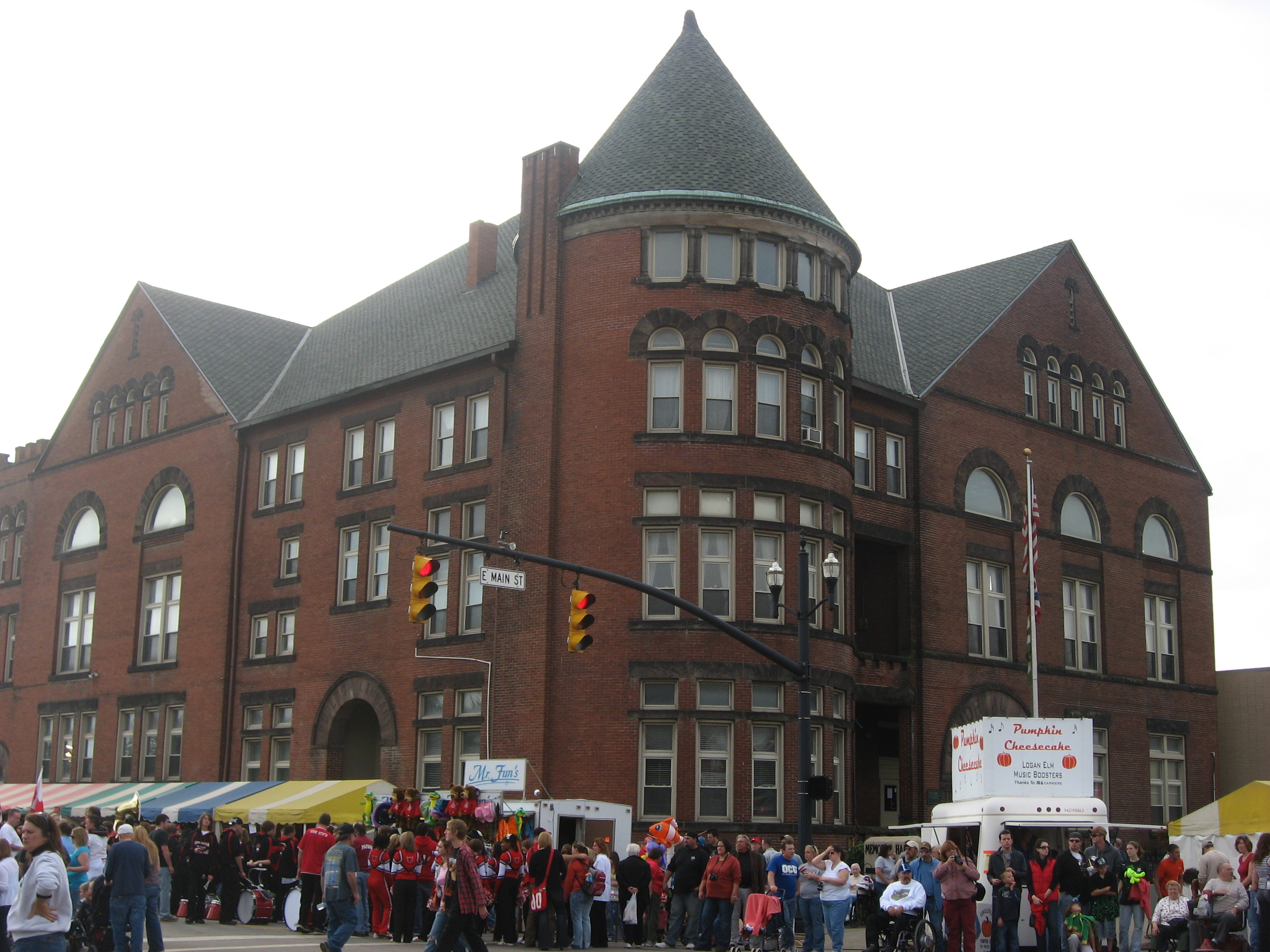
- Northern and eastern sides

- Location within Ohio Location within the United States
- Location: 165 E. Main St., Circleville, Ohio
- Coordinates: 39°36′3.4″N 82°56′34″W
- Area: Less than 1 acre (0.40 ha)
- Built: 1891
- Architectural style: Romanesque Revival, Richardsonian Romanesque
- NRHP reference No.: 80003211
- Added to NRHP: November 21, 1980

Circleville Memorial Hall is a historic community center and war memorial in the city of Circleville, Ohio, United States. Built in the years after the Civil War to remember the victims of the war, it has been named a historic site.

In 1871, the state legislature enacted legislation to encourage the construction of Civil War memorials: the new law permitted Ohio's counties to gather money for the construction of memorials. This law permitted the construction of the Pickaway County memorial in Circleville twenty years later. Besides serving as a war memorial, the building has provided space for numerous community activities: the city's public library has long been housed on the first floor, while no meeting hall in the city is larger than the one in Memorial Hall's upper floors.

Three stories tall, Memorial Hall is a brick building with a stone foundation and additional elements of brick and stone. The exterior is a clear example of the Richardsonian Romanesque style, due to elements such as the rounded archways, the heavy masonry construction and stone trim around its ribbon windows, its columns, and a massive corner tower. Inside, the community auditorium features a large balcony on the third floor.

In late 1980, Memorial Hall was listed on the National Register of Historic Places, qualifying for inclusion because of its historic architecture.

In recent years, through local funding, donations and state capital appropriations several renovations to the building have taken place including repairs to the roof, updating the HVAC to more modern standards and replacing exterior windows that leaked.
