= Memorial Hall (Milford, Massachusetts) =

- U.S. National Register of Historic Places
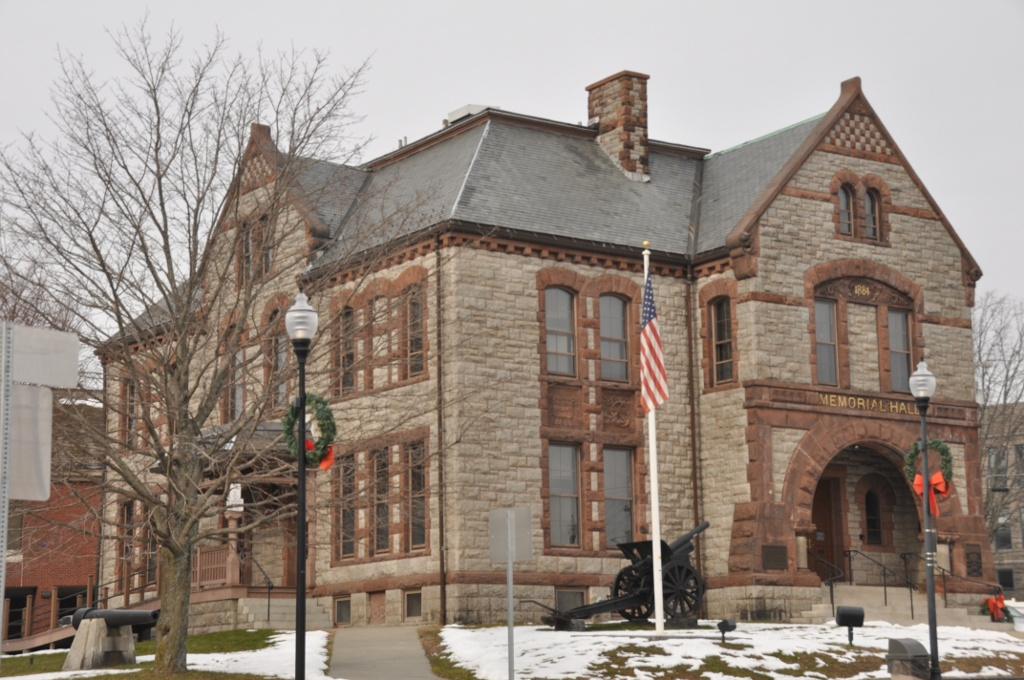

- Location within Massachusetts Location within the United States
- Location: Milford, Massachusetts
- Coordinates: 42°8′31.7142″N 71°31′10.2108″W
- Built: 1884
- Architect: Frederick Swasey
- Architectural style: Richardsonian Romanesque
- NRHP reference No.: 85000983
- Added to NRHP: May 9, 1985

Memorial Hall is an historic hall located at 30 School Street in Milford, Massachusetts. It was built as a Civil War tribute.

Designed by Milford architect Frederick Swasey in the Richardsonian Romanesque style, the hall was built in 1884 from local Milford granite and Longmeadow brownstone. The building features carved brownstone figures and panels inscribed "Grant" and "Farragut". On the front of the hall, there is a bronze plaque inscribed with Lincoln's Gettysburg Address.

The building was added to the National Register of Historic Places in 1985. It underwent a restoration in 2001–2002. It is now home to the Milford Historical Commission, whose museum is open to visitors Thursdays from 1-4 pm or by appointment.

== See also ==
- National Register of Historic Places listings in Worcester County, Massachusetts
