= Rich Gotham =

American business executive (born 1964)

Rich Ernest Gotham
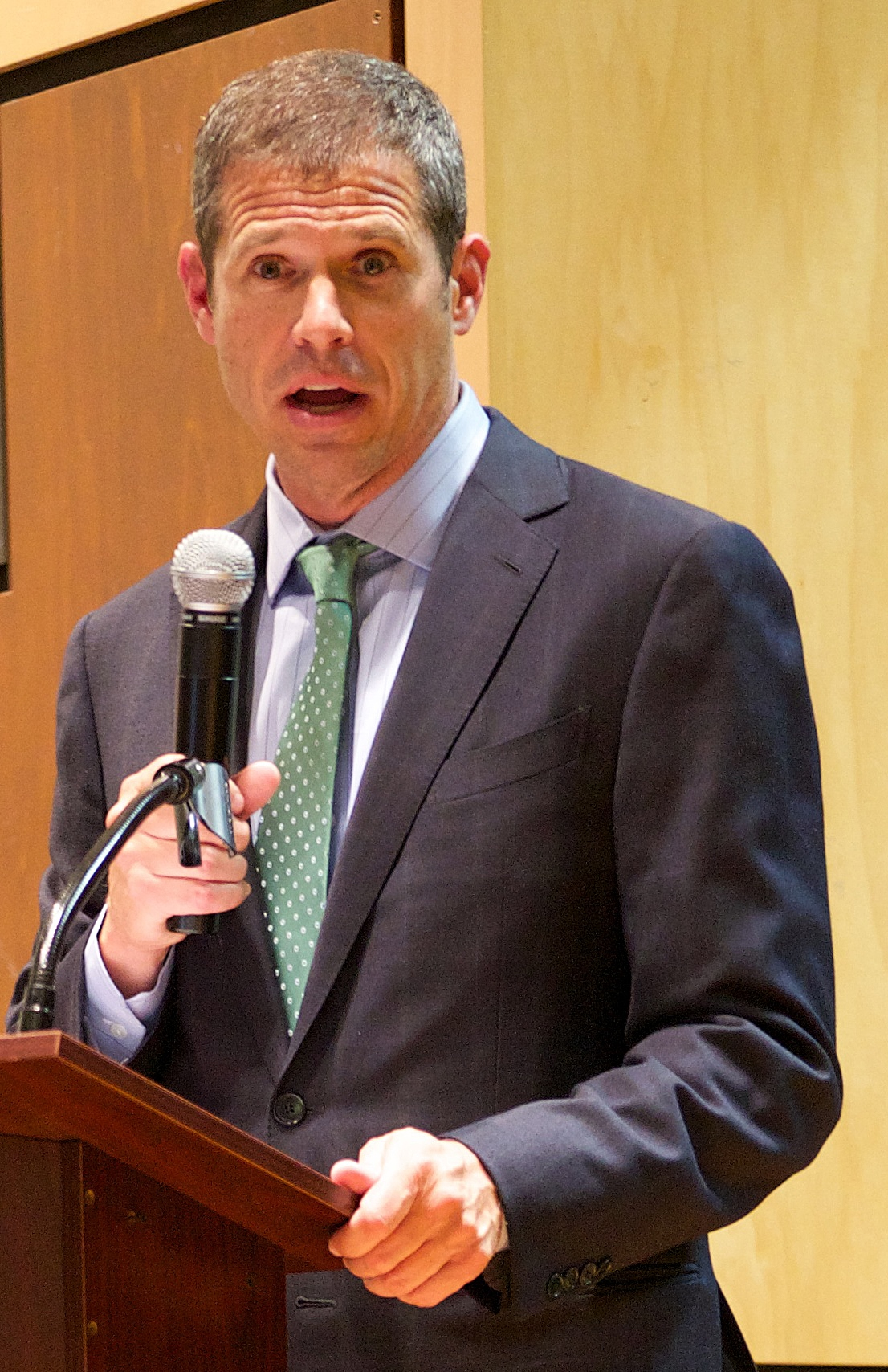
- Gotham speaks at a United States Department of Education town hall at Mattapan in 2014

Boston Celtics
- Positions: Chief Operating Officer & President
- League: NBA

Personal information
- Born: August 31, 1964 (age 62) Norwood, Massachusetts, U.S.

Career information
- High school: Milford High School
- College: Providence College

Richard Ernest Gotham (born August 31, 1964) is an American business executive who is the president of the Boston Celtics of the National Basketball Association (NBA). He is a graduate of Providence College and resident of Medfield, Massachusetts. On April 18, 2007, Gotham was named president of the Boston Celtics. Prior to that, he had a successful career as an executive within the online media and Internet technology industries.

== College ==
Gotham was born in Norwood, Massachusetts. After graduating from Milford High School in 1982, Gotham attended Providence College in Rhode Island. He graduated in 1986, with a bachelor's degree in Business Administration with a concentration in Marketing. An active alumnus, he is currently a member of the Providence College Boston President's Council, Varsity Athletics Board, and the Vision Team for the Men's Basketball program.

== Business career ==
Gotham spent five years holding senior management positions with the global internet media company Lycos. His last job with the company was the Vice-President of Sales and Corporate Development. Prior to that, he was Vice-President of Channel Sales and Market Development with FTP Software.

== Boston Celtics ==
Gotham left Lycos in April 2003, and joined the Celtics as the organization's Executive Vice-President of Sales, Marketing and Corporate Development. He was promoted to chief operating officer in June 2006.

On April 18, 2007, Gotham was named President of the Celtics. The position had been vacant since team patriarch Red Auerbach died in October 2006.

== See also ==
- List of National Basketball Association team presidents

Preceded by Red Auerbach	Boston Celtics Team President; 2007–Present	Succeeded by Present
