= Thomas Silloway =

American architect

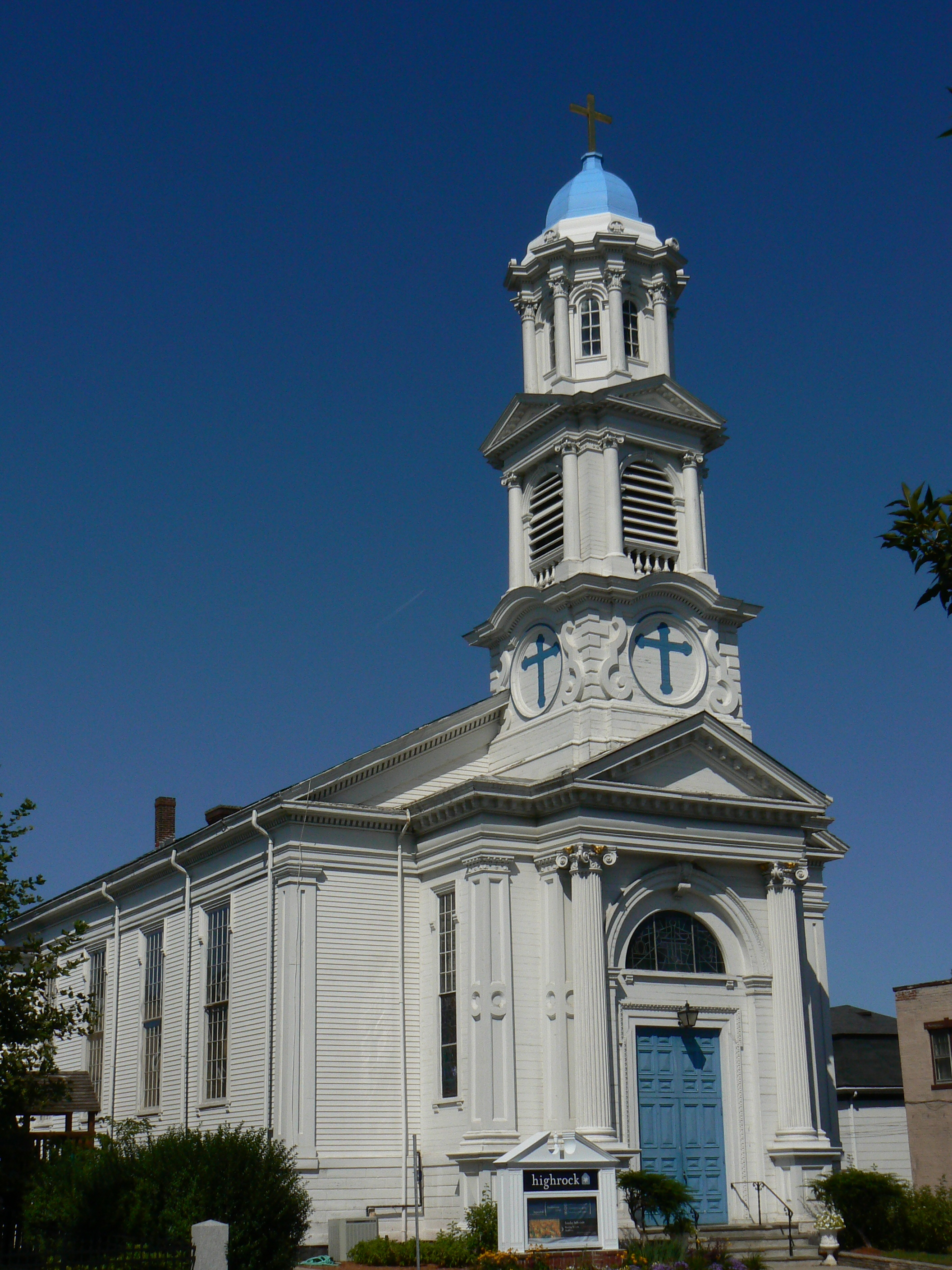
Highrock Church, Arlington, Massachusetts (c. 1841), one of Silloway's earliest works

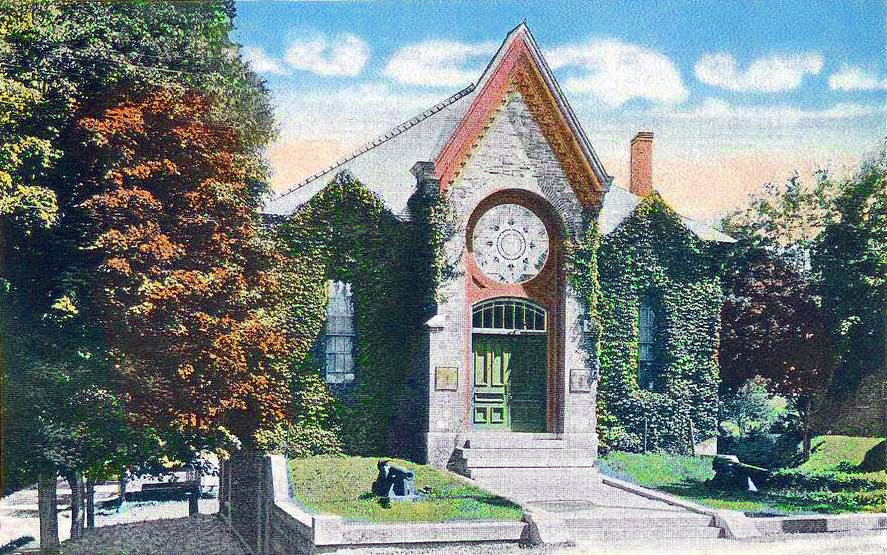
Memorial Hall, Oakland, Maine (1870)

Thomas William Silloway (August 7, 1828 – May 17, 1910) was an American architect, known for building over 400 church buildings in the eastern United States.

Silloway was born in Newburyport, Massachusetts, and raised a Methodist by his parents, Susan Stone Silloway and Thomas Silloway, Sr., a coppersmith. As a teenager, Silloway was apprenticed to a housewright and as a clerk in an East India merchant store.

In 1844 Silloway became a Universalist. He was educated in the local public schools, at Brown High School, and in the local Latin School. In 1847 he began studying under Ammi B. Young, designer of the Boston Custom House. In 1851 he began his own architecture practice. In 1862 Silloway started a second career as a Universalist minister in New Hampshire, Boston, and Brighton, Massachusetts. He left the ministry in 1867 when his architectural work increased. Silloway had diverse interests in architecture, theology, music, and genealogy, and published many books on diverse topics.

By the time he died in 1910 Silloway was credited for designing more church buildings than any other individual in America. Robert Charles Bates, an early African American architect and teacher, had studied under Silloway from 1885 to 1893.

== Notable works ==
- Highrock Church, ca. 1841, Arlington, Massachusetts
- Milford Town Hall, 1853, Milford, Massachusetts
- Vermont State House, 1858, Montpelier, Vermont
- East Hall, 1860, Medford, Massachusetts
- First Congregational Church, 1870, Waltham, Massachusetts
- Memorial Hall, 1870, Oakland, Maine
- Roslindale Baptist Church, 1884, Boston, Massachusetts
- Unitarian Church in Charleston, 1886, Charleston, South Carolina
- Conway Public Library, ca. 1901, Conway, NH
- Dexter Universalist Church (Dexter, Maine), 1869, Dexter, Maine

== Publications by Silloway ==
- Thomas William Silloway, Lee L. Powers, The cathedral towns and intervening places of England, Ireland and Scotland (A. Williams, 1883 )
