= Mayflower Inn on Manomet Point =

Coordinates: 41.9239°N 70.5437°W

The Mayflower Inn on Manomet Point, sometimes referred to as the Mayflower Hotel, was located in the White Horse Beach area of Plymouth, Massachusetts, from 1917 to 1977. It was considered one of the town's four grand hotels. The inn's main building was set atop a hill off Point Road, with sweeping vistas of Cape Cod Bay to the north and Scooks (now called Scokes) Pond to the south. The Shore Club with a swimming pool, changing facilities, ocean-front guest rooms, and a restaurant was later added a short walk north from the main building to the beach at Manomet Point.

== History ==
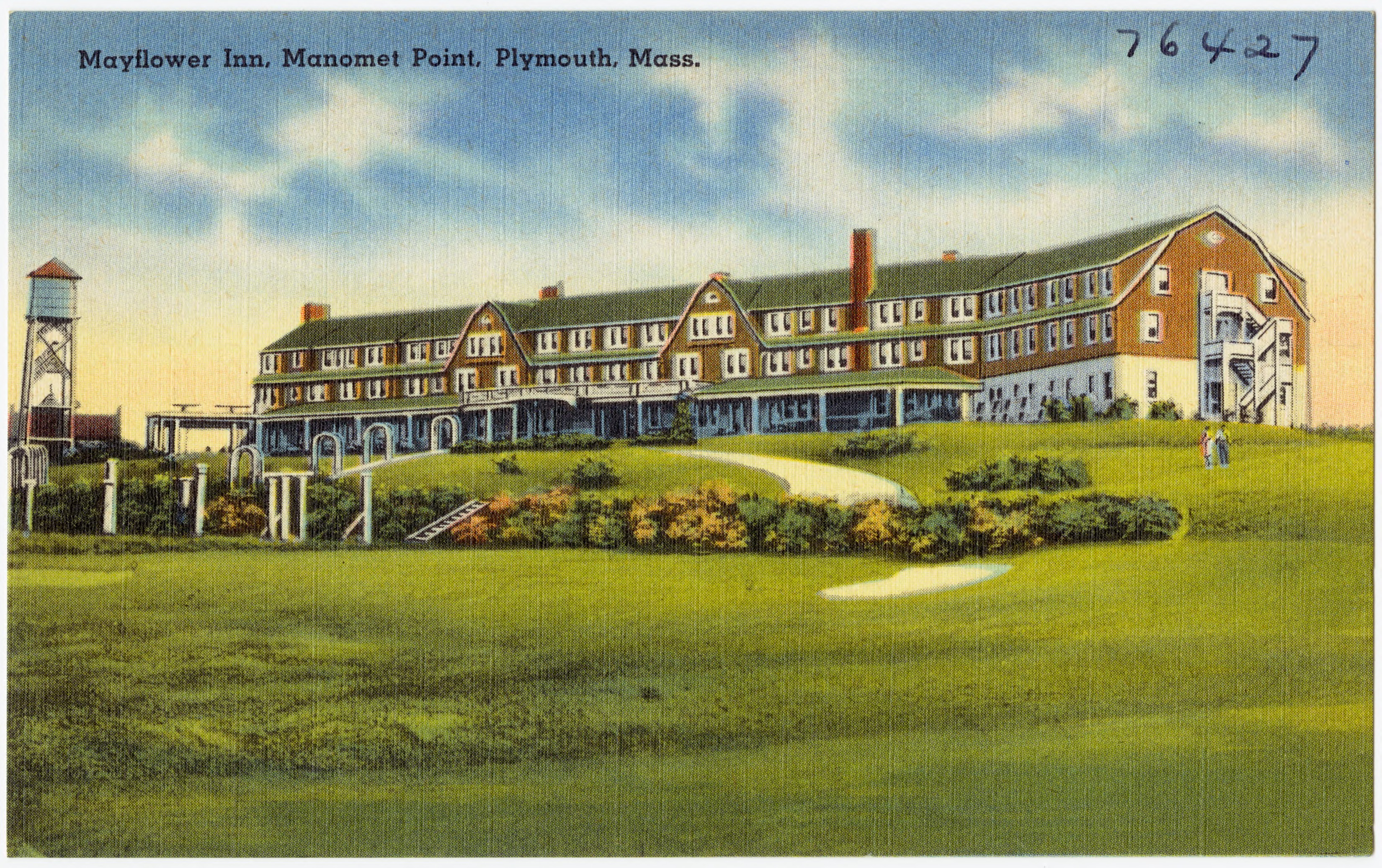
Postcard portraying the Mayflower Inn on Manomet Point (circa 1930–1945)

=== 1910s ===
The 260-foot-long, three-story-tall Mayflower Inn was opened in June 1917 by the Keith Hotel Company, with Elijah A. Keith as president, who hired the David Irving Company out of Brockton, Massachusetts, as contractors. At opening, the inn had 170 rooms, each boasting a lavatory, a telephone, and light by electricity. According to The Patriot Ledger, "The Mayflower was billed as an exclusive 'thoroughly modern, up-to-the-minute summer hotel' ... described as designed 'for wealthy Americans, New England Governors conventions and politicians.'"

In a marketing postcard sent by the Keith Hotel Company to Mr. Henry S. Appleton of Peabody, Massachusetts, announcing the hotel's inaugural summer season, the Mayflower Inn promised guests "appointments [that] will gratify your most fastidious desires; its cuisine is unexcelled; it offers all the summer sports—golf, tennis, bathing, fishing, motoring, dancing, and afternoon tea."

Guests could take a free bus to play golf at the nearby Plymouth Country Club along Warren Avenue, which expanded from nine holes to 18 holes in 1921, and then 18 holes to 27 holes in 1929. The original nine holes, which had been made public, went into bankruptcy in 1932.

=== 1920s ===
In a Boston Globe article from Mar. 3, 1924, Charles Dooley is noted as the current owner of the Mayflower Inn.

==== Notable Events ====
During the Pilgrim Tercentenary in 1921, President Calvin Coolidge and Vice President Warren G. Harding made appearances at the Mayflower Inn during their visit to Plymouth.

On Jun. 17, 1923, the Mayflower Inn and the nearby Pilgrim Hotel hosted a reunion of the Harvard University classes of 1908 and 1913. Members of the class of 1908 helped open the new Mayflower Inn golf course.

On Apr. 17, 1924, Manomet summer resident Joseph W. Howard of Somerville, Massachusetts, took the Mayflower Inn to court, claiming the inn's elevated water tower was faulty, discharging water onto his property and damaging his structure, automobiles, and gardens.

On Oct. 10, 1924, two men working on the Mayflower Inn golf course discovered a pair of skeletons buried in a small hill about 200 yards from the ocean. They were believed to be the remains of Native Americans, but no arrowheads or other notable implements were found in the burial site.

On Sept. 7, 1925, a new car, owned by Alfred Le-Witt of New Britain, Connecticut, was stolen from the front of the Mayflower Inn. It was found wrecked on Point Road three hours later.

On Sept. 15, 1926, 310 members of the Harrisburg, Pennsylvania, Chamber of Commerce dined at the Mayflower Inn, including ex-Lieut. Gov. Edward E. Beidleman, Mayor George A. Hoverter, Francis J. Hall, Roy Shoemaker, and Herman A. Early.

On Jul. 30, 1928, the Mayflower Inn provided its water supply to the Plymouth fire department to help them battle a house fire on Manomet Point, where there was no other water system. The house and garage that were destroyed, causing an estimated $4,000 in damages, were owned by Joseph W. Howard, the man who had sued the inn over its water tower four years earlier.

=== 1930s ===
On Jun. 3, 1930, 150 members of the Boston College senior class held their annual outing at the Mayflower Inn, featuring baseball, golf, and swimming during the day, followed by a banquet in the evening.

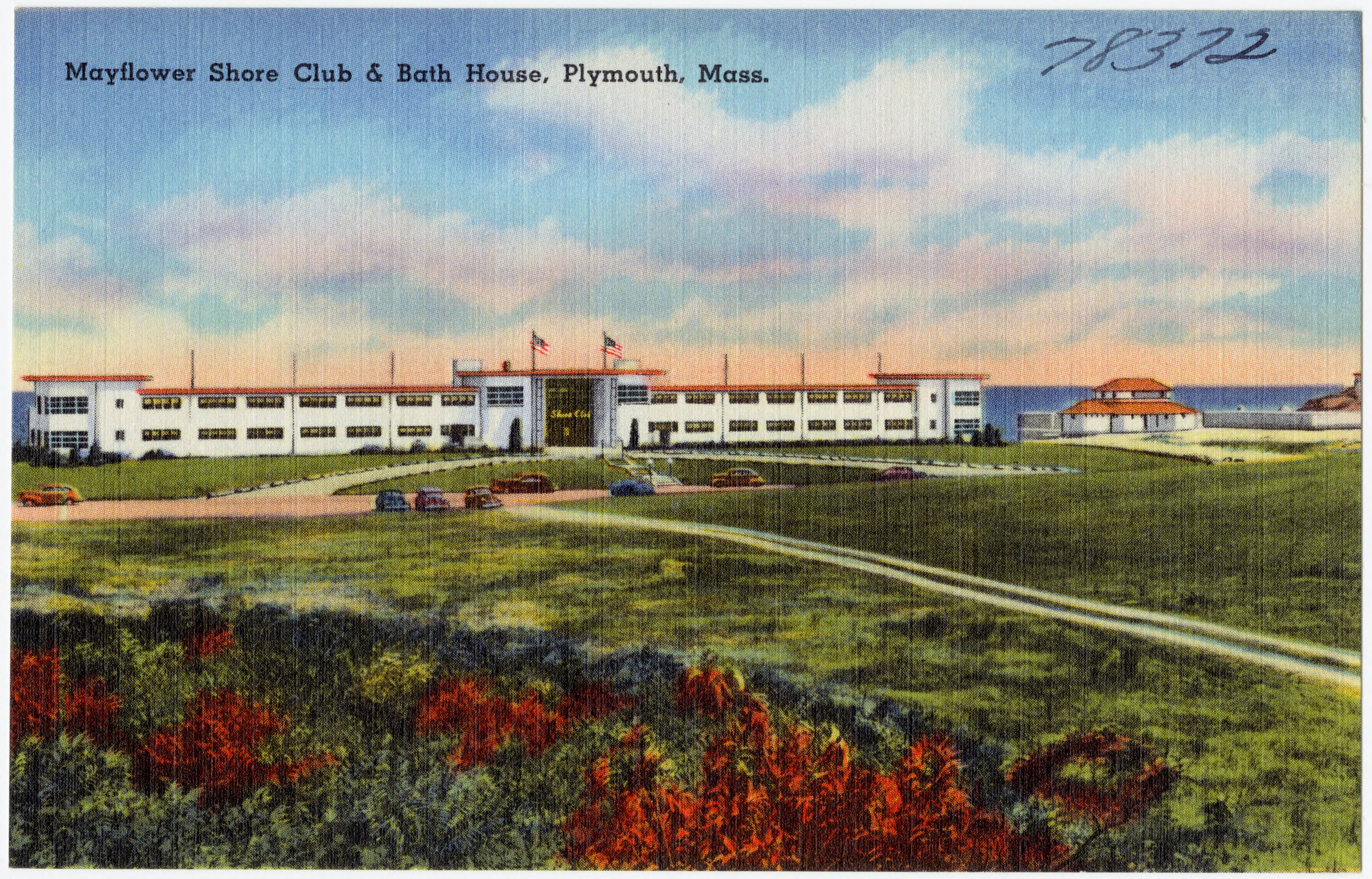
Postcard portraying the Mayflower Shore Club and Bath House, Plymouth, Mass (circa 1930–1945)

=== 1940s ===
After World War II ended, the Mayflower Inn expanded to include the Mayflower Shore Club and Bath House, an Art Deco-style, two-story building on the waterfront. This began its "golden era," as grew into a massive hub for local high society, high school proms, beachside clambakes, and elegant weddings.

The Boston Dooley family maintained ownership of the Mayflower Inn until 1945.

=== 1950s ===
In its heyday the Mayflower Inn, "attracted a New York clientele and dominated life along the shoreline in 1950s," according to The Old Colony Memorial newspaper.

They really catered to wealthy people ... They owned all the cottages along Taylor Avenue and had a shore club and annex. The people would all eat at the main hotel and a lot of the women would even have fur coats on and this was in the summer. They even had an amphibious plane that would fly people in. It would run right up on the beach. The mighty hotel fell on hard times as resorts in the Catskills gained in popularity in the 1960s.

=== 1960s ===
The Mayflower Inn held Family Day on Sept. 24, 1967, featuring an appearance by TV's "Boomtown" singing cowboy Rex Trailer and his "fabulous cast of TV stars": Gold Rush, White Cloud, and Homer Corncastle and Sgt. Billie from "F Troop." The event included a Sunday buffet, rope tricks, songs, shooting, exhibitions, bullwhip tricks, comedy, and more.

On Feb. 17, 1968, the Mayflower Inn hosted Plymouth's annual Beaux Arts Masque Ball, sponsored by the Plymouth Chamber of Commerce with costume prizes, refreshments, and dancing. The February 1969 Beaux Arts Masque Ball featured nearly 200 dancers in colorful costumes, where funeral director Robert Cartmell of Allerton Street won the award for funniest costume and was awarded engraved Paul Revere silver bowls.

From May 31–June 1, 1969, the Yankee region of the Rolls Royce Owners Club of America gathered at the Mayflower Inn with 20 antique cars, including a 1923 Rolls Royce Silver Ghost.

On Aug. 9, 1969, the Mayflower Inn held a community chicken barbecue to benefit the Red Cross Blood Center. Attendees enjoyed swimming, sunbathing, and music; clowns Harry the Hat and Sad Sam were on site to entertain the children. Tickets were $3.50 for adults and $2.50 for children.

=== 1970s ===
The Mayflower Inn continued to host numerous weddings, proms, reunions, and other events until it was destroyed by two fires.

=== 1990–Today ===
In 1990, the trustees of the Mayflower on the Bay Realty Trust sold the land where the Mayflower Inn had sat to a condominium community called Highlands at Oceans Point.

== Fires ==
=== First Fire: 1973 ===
On Apr. 12, 1973, the Mayflower Inn suffered a significant fire, believed to have started in the first-floor cocktail lounge around 5 a.m. Plymouth firefighters were aided by Duxbury, Plympton, and Kingston firefighters. Two firefighters were treated for injuries at Jordan Hospital. It caused an estimated $1 million in damages:

Reportedly, a hot air explosion ripped through the cocktail lounge moments before the firefighters arrived, blowing out all the windows on that side of the building. Some 75 percent of the roof had fallen in before the blaze was brought under control.

=== Second Fire: 1977 ===
On Mar. 15, 1977, while crews were actively renovating the building to reopen it for the summer season after it had recently been purchased by Dennis O'Driscoll, a second catastrophic fire broke out:

The Plymouth hotel fire was discovered shortly after 10 a.m. Fire Chief Arthur Lamb sounded the general alarm as flames raced through the main section of the wood structure. Chief Lamb estimated damage at $100,000.

== Architecture ==
The main building of the Mayflower Inn, designed by architect J. Williams Beal, was a Colonial Revival-style structure with a gambrel roof, shed-roof dormers, paired front gambrel bays, and an extended veranda with balustrades. The design was markedly similar to that of the Chatham Bars Inn, which opened in 1914 in nearby Chatham, Massachusetts.

== Notable Guests ==
- Rocky Marciano
- Sherman Adams
