= White Horse Beach, Massachusetts =

Village in Massachusetts, United States

Coordinates: 41°55′51″N 70°33′30″W

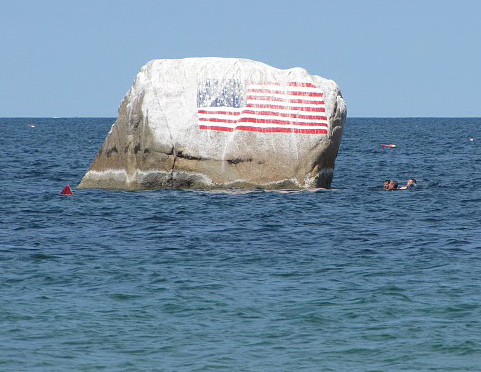
Flag Rock lies off shore White Horse Beach in Plymouth, Massachusetts.

White Horse Beach is a village within the jurisdiction of Plymouth, Massachusetts, United States. It is located on Cape Cod Bay, south of Priscilla Beach. Much of the southern end of the beach, which is also known as Taylor Avenue Beach, south of the outflow of Bartlett Pond, either has cottages on it or has a fenced off conservation area to protect the dunes and fragile plant life.

The area has evolved from a beach catering to summer visitors to a mostly residential area.

At the northern end of the beach is a rock protruding from the water with an American flag painted on. According to local lore, this act of patriotism was performed to cover a Nazi swastika painted on the rock. In the summer of 1941, local teenagers painted the first flag and went on to join the armed forces after Pearl Harbor was attacked in December of that year. The harsh winter storms washed the flag thin, so the swastika showed through. The next Fourth of July, the tradition of re-painting the flag was born.

== Businesses ==
There is a small business district just beyond the northern end of the beach. It has a defunct general store along with an active Post Office. The post office ZIP code is 02381. Residents and businesses in this village that are non-Post Office box holders use Plymouth's ZIP code of 02360.

Further inland is a park named for a Catholic mission chapel, St. Catherine's Chapel, which supported the large influx of summer time people from the Boston area. The chapel's parking lot offered free parking and an easy walk to the beach for beach-goers and cottage guests. The chapel was sold to an individual with local ties who razed the structure and directed the landscaping of the property with grass and trees to serve as a small park. Additionally, White Horse Cemetery which dates back to the early 18th century is located off Rocky Hill Road, accessed by a trail, it is hidden from view.

The Post Office, originally inside the General Store, leases a space in the former White Horse Bowling Alley that included pool tables, and pinball machines. Pin setting was done manually by "Pin Spotters", who had to move fast to keep up with the Bowlers

== Hotels ==
White Horse Beach was previously home to multiple hotels, including the Hotel Pilgrim at Manomet Point, the Mayflower Inn on Manomet Point, the Ardmore Inn, and the White Horse Hotel.

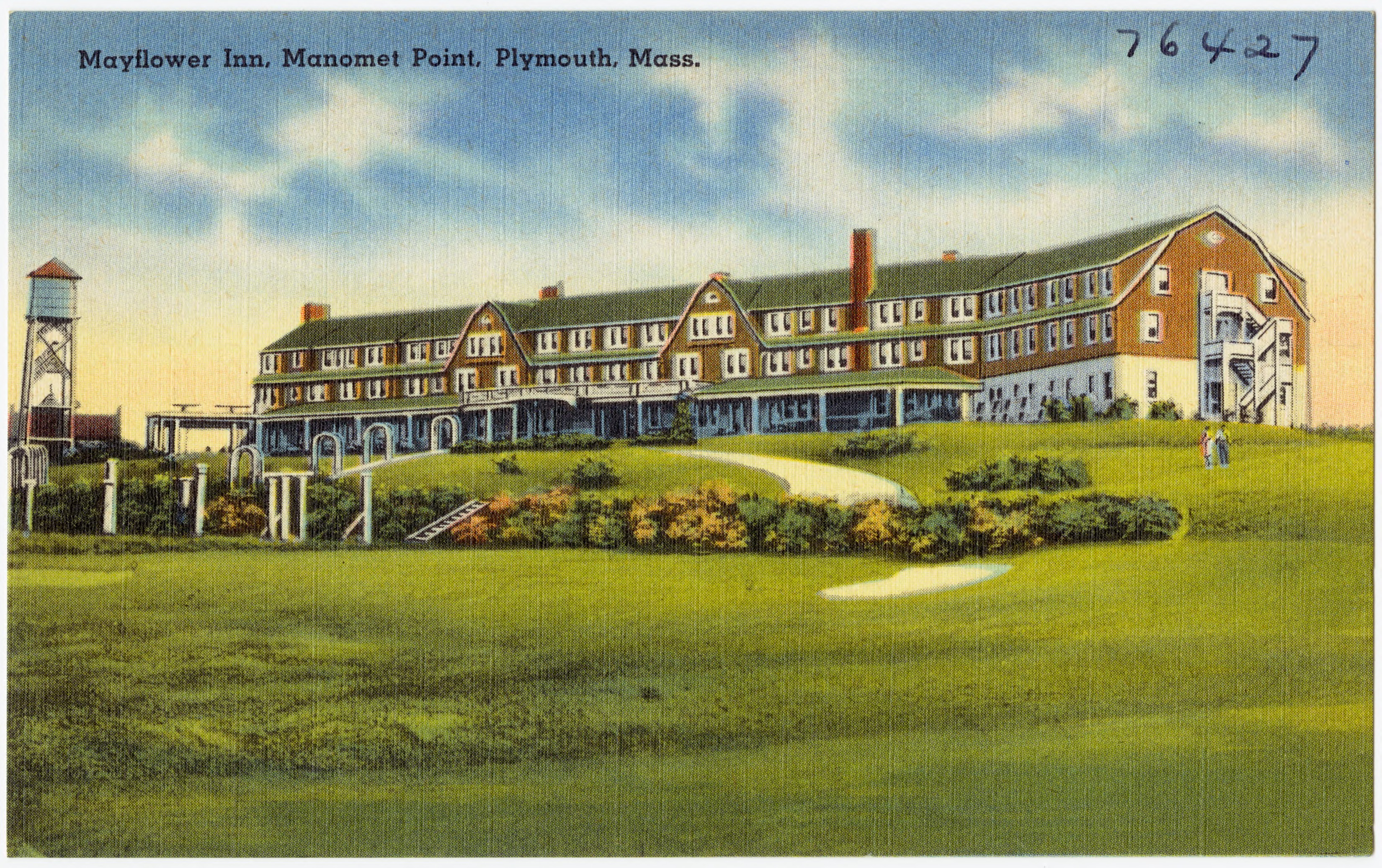
Postcard portraying the Mayflower Inn on Manomet Point (circa 1930–1945)

The Mayflower Inn on Manomet Point, also called the Mayflower Hotel, was a grand three-story Gambrel shingle-style building that was opened in June 1917 by the Keith Hotel Company. Designed by architect J. Williams Beal, it had a noticeably similar exterior style to the Chatham Bars Inn in Chatham, MA, which had opened only three years prior. Each of its 170 guest rooms included a lavatory, a telephone, and light by electricity. The hotel had a bakery and a beauty parlor, with masseuses and chauffeured cars on site. Guests could enjoy afternoon tea with an ocean view or take a bus to play golf at the nearby Plymouth Country Club. Newspaper advertisements promoted a "special Sunday dinner" with clams, lobster, chicken, duckling, sides, desserts, and coffee for the special "pre-war price" of $2.50.

The Mayflower became a desirable place for functions, conventions, reunions, and receptions. During the Pilgrim Tercentenary in 1921, Vice President Warren G. Harding and President Calvin Coolidge made appearances. In the 1940s, post-World War II, the Mayflower began to host more socially festive events like galas, dances, and clambakes on the beach, attracting musicians, businessmen, and politicians. One notable guest was boxing champion Rocky Marciano. By the 1950s, it expanded to include an ocean-front pavilion and established itself as a summer spot for the wealthy and elite, with some even arriving by seaplane for the hotel's lavish parties.

Put Burns, who worked as a water-skiing instructor at the Mayflower in the '50s, told The Boston Globe, "They really catered to wealthy people. They owned all the cottages along Taylor Avenue and had a shore club and annex. The people would all eat at the main hotel and a lot of the women would even have fur coats on and this was in the summer. They even had an amphibious plane that would fly people in. It would run right up on the beach."

After suffering from financial decline in the 1960s as much of its regular clientele began summering in the Catskills, a fire on April 12, 1973, caused $1m in damages and closed the Mayflower for a year. When it reopened during renovations, another fire on March 15, 1977, caused an estimated $100,000 in additional damages, according to the Fire Chief. What remained of the hotel was razed.

== Annual activities ==
White Horse Beach is widely known for its Independence Day celebrations, which are held on July 3 annually. This early celebration of Independence Day extends back to the 1800s, when residents burned scrap and driftwood on the beach. Tradition would dictate that these bonfires be extinguished by the rising tide. Depending on the phase of the moon, festivities would go late into the evening. In recent years, the town fire department has begun to request permits for bonfires (non-permitted bonfires are sometimes removed by the fire department). Historically, town officials have requested that these fires be extinguished no earlier than midnight. Also in recent years, the celebrations have experienced a soft "crackdown by police and fire departments" to deter the historically massive bonfires and fireworks; "NO Public Parking or Restroom Facilities" are officially advertised on location for this event to deter non-residents from attending.

== Landmarks and recreation ==
White Horse Beach is also in proximity to the Priscilla Beach Theatre, a professional center for drama education and performance dating back to the 1930s. It is also the location of Bartlett Pond, which is a shallow eutrophic pond located inland from White Horse Beach. This pond is fed by Beaver Dam Brook and its outlet flows into Cape Cod Bay. White Horse was known as part of the "Irish Riviera" due to the large population of Irish descendants from Dorchester, Somerville, and South Boston who would vacation there in the 1940s, 1950s and 1960s. It was the typical summer community that one would find on the South Shore and Cape Cod. Many cottages from that era still stand to this day, though some have been destroyed by storms and a great many have been renovated to year-round homes, partly due to the Boston real estate market. This infusion of year-round residents had a dramatic effect on the local economy, as White Horse Beach transitioned from a seasonal community of vacationers to a bedroom community of greater Boston.

White Horse Beach landmarks include:

- Located atop Manomet Point is a small monument marking the location of the Manomet Point Life-Saving Station. Starting in 1874, the station and its surfmen kept a watchful eye on vessels seeking the calmer waters closer to land along the South Shore. The monument commemorates the Surfmen who served this community and those that made the supreme sacrifice in an attempt to rescue crew members of a floundering vessel (Robert E. Lee).
- White Horse General Store
- White Horse Rock (AKA Flag Rock)

== See also ==
- Neighborhoods in Plymouth, Massachusetts
- Priscilla Beach
