= Priscilla Beach, Massachusetts =

Village in Massachusetts, United States

Coordinates: 41°55′55″N 70°34′00″W

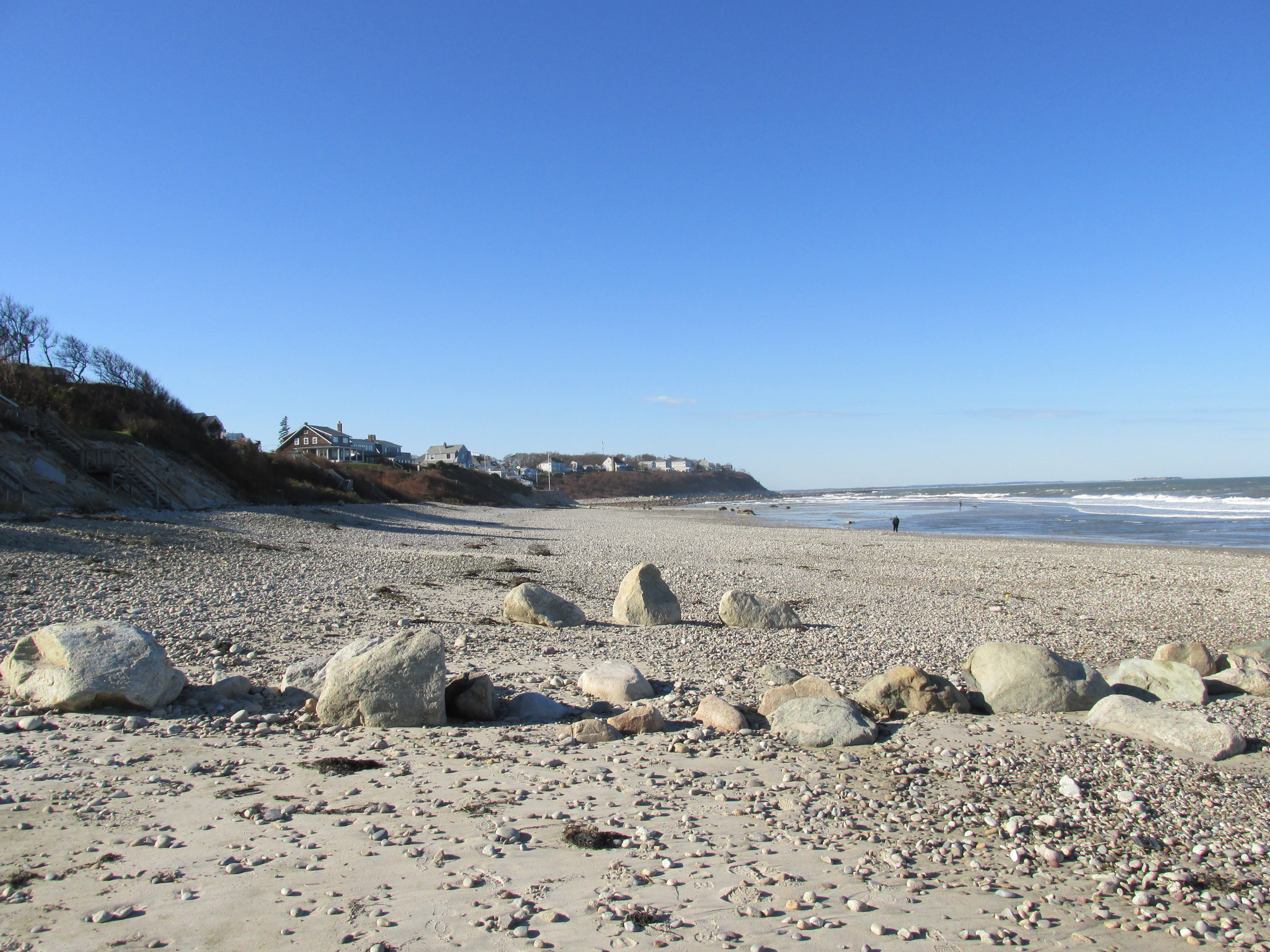
Priscilla Beach

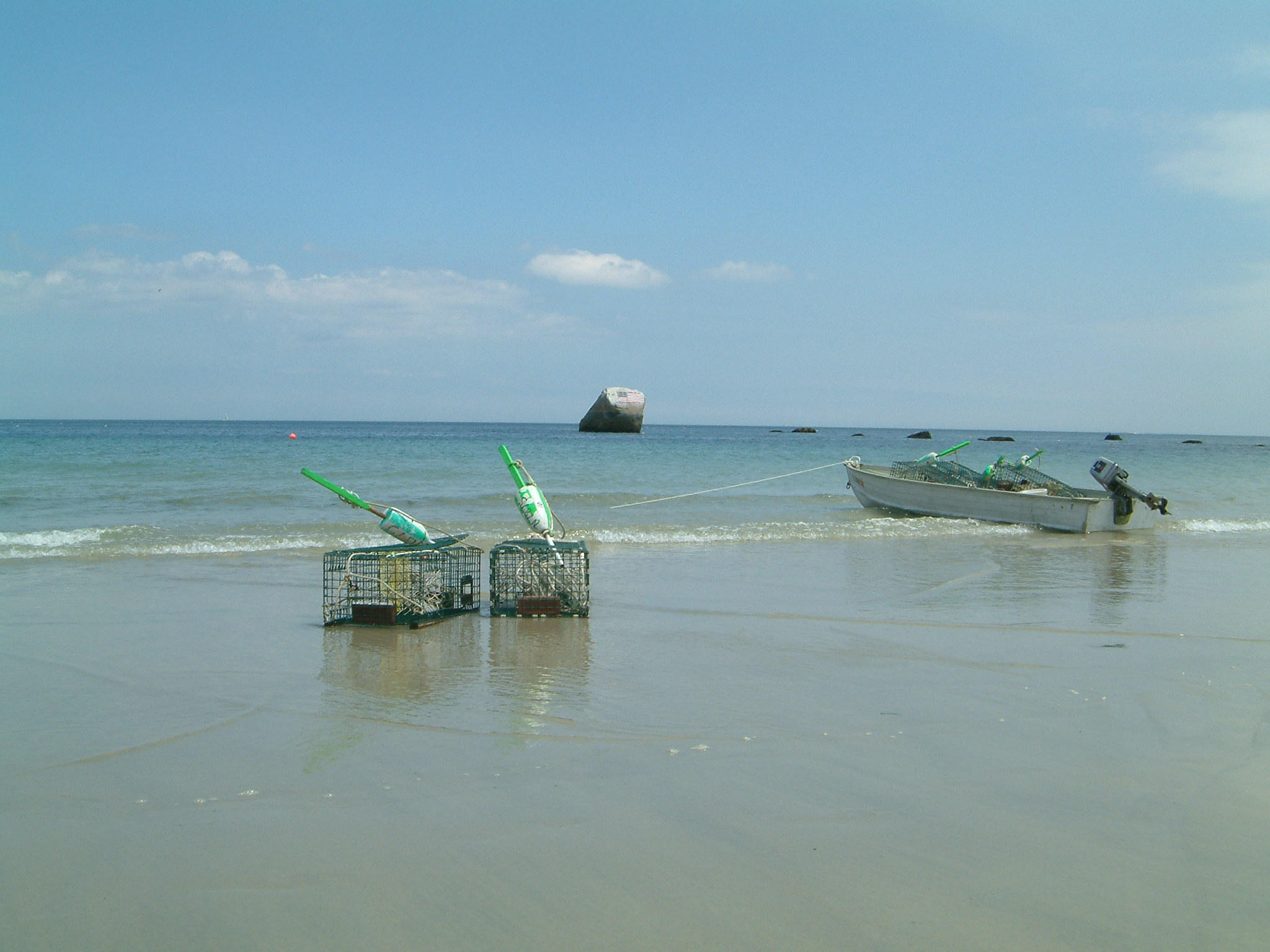
Lobster pots and Flag Rock from Priscilla Beach

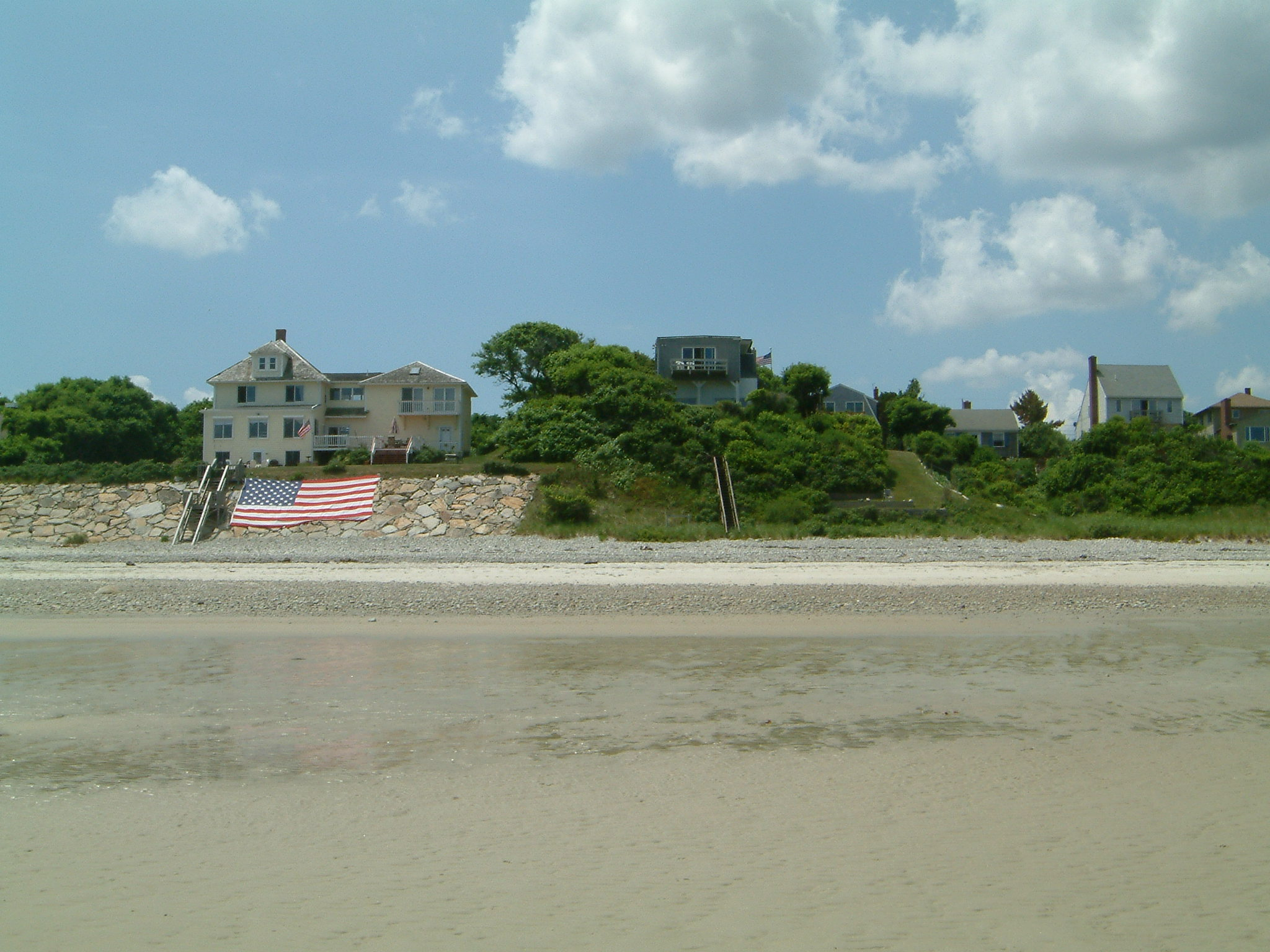
Independence Day at Priscilla Beach

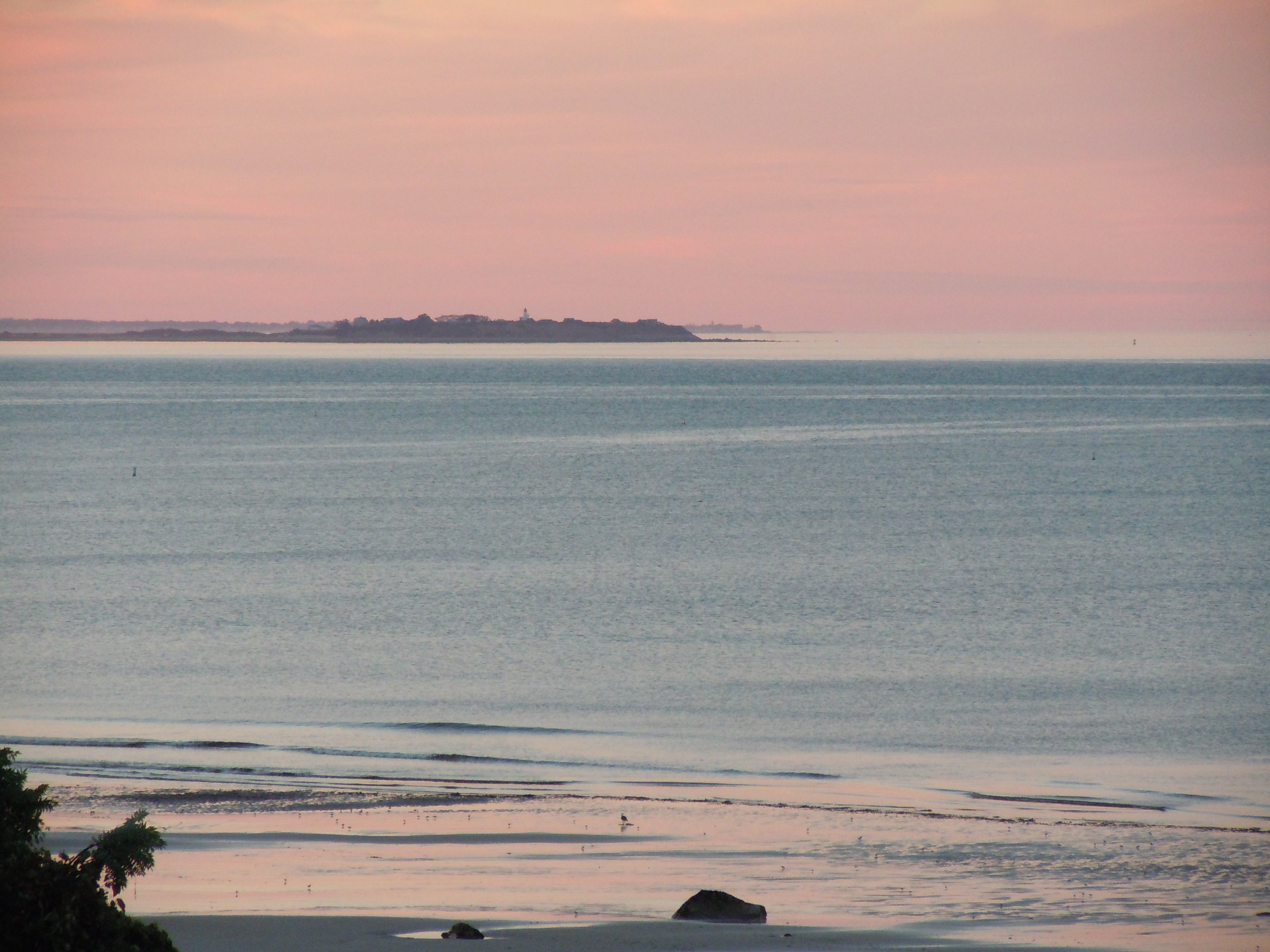
Gurnet Point from Priscilla Beach

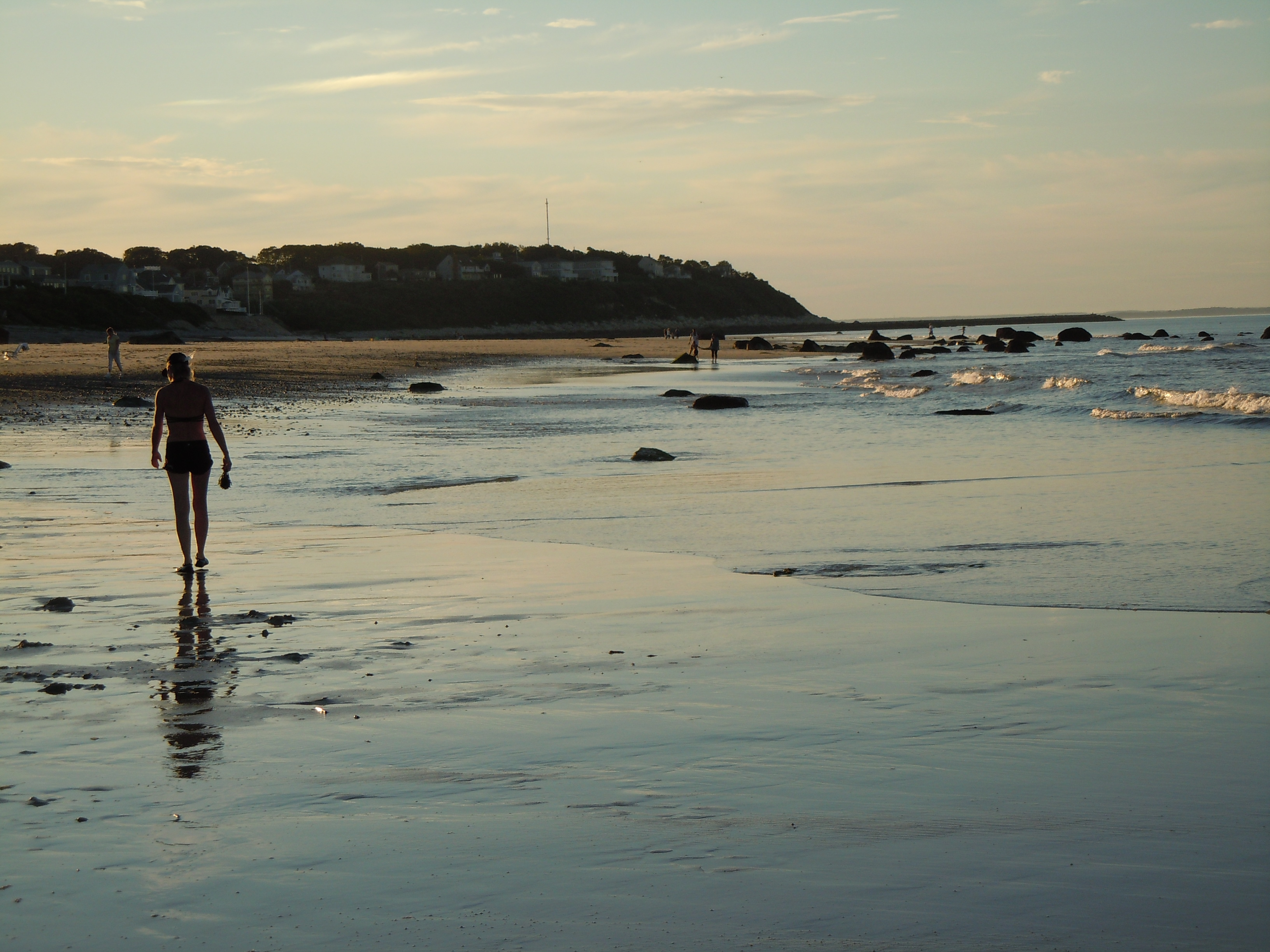
Low tide at Priscilla Beach

Priscilla Beach is a village of Plymouth, Massachusetts, United States. It consists of a private beach on Cape Cod Bay in the Manomet section of Plymouth, located between Pilgrim Station and White Horse Beach. The Priscilla Beach Association (PBA) was formed on July 17, 1937, to promote and foster the social and civic welfare of the residents and owners of real estate in Priscilla Beach. The PBA is dedicated to the protection, preservation, and improvement of Priscilla Beach as a private beach for the interest of the property owners in Priscilla Beach.

Priscilla Beach Theatre, founded by Dr. Franklin Trask in 1937, is the oldest barn theatre still in operation in the United States, and is located in Priscilla Beach.

Manomet, the village of Plymouth in which Priscilla Beach is located, is especially well known for its Independence Day festivities, which here are traditionally celebrated on July 3.

== See also ==
- Neighborhoods in Plymouth, Massachusetts
