= Pollution on Cape Cod =

Cape Cod, Massachusetts contains marine, estuarine, freshwater, and terrestrial ecosystems that provide habitat and breeding grounds for a animals including endangered North Atlantic right whales and humpback whales. It’s also home to commercial fisheries and shellfish farming operations, worth millions of dollars. According to the “Center for Coastal Studies”, it takes about a month for the waters of Cape Cod Bay to be completely drained and refilled, which has allowed toxic levels of nitrogen-based chemicals to build up. The main source (approximately 80%) comes from septic systems, augmented by fertilizer runoff and other forms of pollutants from nearby parking lots. This excess nitrogen (eutrophication), is linked to toxic algal blooms and depleted oxygen levels (hypoxia). Research for this problem is ongoing, with a plan to mitigate some of the damage through the expansion and/or creation of sewer systems throughout the area.

Efforts to address this issue are ongoing, and one proposed strategy involves the expansion and creation of sewer systems throughout the area to reduce the input of nitrogen compounds. Researchers continue to study and monitor the situation to find effective solutions to mitigate the environmental impacts and preserve the delicate balance of the Cape Cod ecosystems.

== Background ==
On Cape Cod, small inland ponds known as Kettle ponds and the surrounding waters of the Atlantic Ocean have become increasingly polluted over the years. The main pollutant considered to be problematic in these waters is nitrogen. The high amount of nitrogen in the water stems from the widespread use of private septic tanks in homes instead of the use of a town-owned sewer. Many towns around Cape Cod opted out of purchasing sewer systems when the federal government subsidized them in the 1960's and 1970's to avoid the influx of new homeowners to the communities. However, Cape Cod's communities grew despite the lack of public sewage systems, resulting in the installation of many septic tanks in new homes.

The increased nitrogen levels in the waters of Cape Cod increased algae blooming in the spring and summer months as it is a key nutrient. Death of the algae creates a thick buildup of slime on the bottom of the bays and ponds, which severely reduces the amount of shellfish and crabs able to survive on the seafloor. The algae also limits the amount of available oxygen in the water, which asphyxiates the fish living there. Algae is also a source of red tides, which have been occurring more frequently with the heightened nitrogen levels.

Attempts to counter the problem by affected towns include new programs and procedures to reduce the levels of nitrogen present in the waters of Cape Cod. The most commonly proposed solution is to install new town-wide sewer systems to prevent runoff from septic tanks reaching the water, since sewer systems release less nitrogen into the environment than private septic tanks.
