= Paul Howley =

American comic book & collectibles store owner (born 1955)

Paul Howley (born 1955) is the founder and owner of the "That's Entertainment" comics and collectibles store in Worcester MA, established in 1980, and "Entertainment Publishing". In 1997 Howley and two other comic book store owners received the "Will Eisner Spirit of Comics Retailer Award," from San Diego Comic-Con. The award is intended to honor the best comic shops in the world.

Paul Howley (at left) and Rex Trailer pose for a photo at an event on 12/10/06.

After he got married in 1973, Howley began buying and selling comic books for the first time at comic book conventions in Boston, and for the next three years continued to do business at conventions in Boston and New York. In 1976 he relocated to Tennessee to help open and manage a store for a comic book retailer, then shortly afterward went to work for another comic book retailer in Ohio, traveling around the country to comic book conventions. Eventually, the arduous convention travel schedule conflicted with Howley’s desire to settle down, and he opened That’s Entertainment in Worcester MA in 1980. In 1992, he moved his store to Park Avenue, where it is currently operated. Howley also has a smaller location in Fitchburg MA.

Howley credits his wife for initially encouraging the rebirth of his childhood passion for comics (which had begun at age five), and for supporting his subsequent career path. "My wife was important," Howley said, "mostly because she trusted me to take the risks necessary to open a store."

Howley published officially licensed The Man From U.N.C.L.E. comic books in 1987 and 1988, under the name "Entertainment Publishing". Howley also published the first and several subsequent issues of Mark Marderosian's Delta Tenn comic book series (1987–88), as well as Insect Man‘s 25th Anniversary Special in 1991. Howley's Insect Man had been around since 1965 as a photocopied amateur press offering. This first nationally distributed and professionally printed issue marked the character’s 25th anniversary, and included art by Rick Veitch and Kevin Eastman. In 2016 Howley published another standard-sized issue for the 50th anniversary of Insect Man. The comic featured a cover Gene Colan had penciled several years before his death; the cover was inked by Tom Palmer in the year prior to the issue's publication.

With Brian Paquette, he co-authored The Toys from U.N.C.L.E., an authoritative price and identification guide for The Man from U.N.C.L.E. toys. Howley, Paquette and Marderosian also produced a set of Classic Toys Trading Cards.
