= Bartlett Pond (Plymouth, Massachusetts) =

Pond in Massachusetts, United States

- Location within Massachusetts Location within the United States
- Location: Plymouth, Massachusetts
- Coordinates: 41°55′40″N 70°33′25″W
- Primary inflows: Beaver Dam Brook
- Primary outflows: a river
- Basin countries: United States
- Surface area: 33 acres (13 ha)
- Settlements: White Horse Beach, Manomet Heights

Bartlett Pond is a 33-acre (130,000 m^{2}) pond in the Manomet section of Plymouth, Massachusetts. The inflow of the pond is Beaver Dam Brook, and the outflow is a river that empties into Cape Cod Bay. White Horse Beach nearly surrounds the pond, lying to the southwest, west and north. Manomet Heights lies on the eastern shore.

== Geology ==
Bartlett Pond has water depths of slightly over a meter. The bottom of the pond is made up of fine silt and clay muds with large cobbles, clasts and boulders in some places left behind by the retreat of the glaciers. In a study conducted by University of Massachusetts-Amherst in 2013 and again in 2014, X-ray fluorescence data shows slightly higher abundance of lead and zinc within the upper 50 centimeters of sediment cores taken out of the pond. These elements are common in the shallowest sediments of many ponds throughout the Northeast US, left behind by industrial pollution and leaded gas emissions.

The elements strontium and calcium are associated with seawater, sand, and small fragments of shells and reefs washed ashore during large storms. X-ray fluorescence shows spikes in both elements at certain points associated with layers of sand in the mud. These sand layers may be storm overwash from hurricanes in Massachusetts Bay over the past 700 years.
