= Pilgrim Nuclear Power Station =

Decommissioning nuclear power plant located in Plymouth, Massachusetts

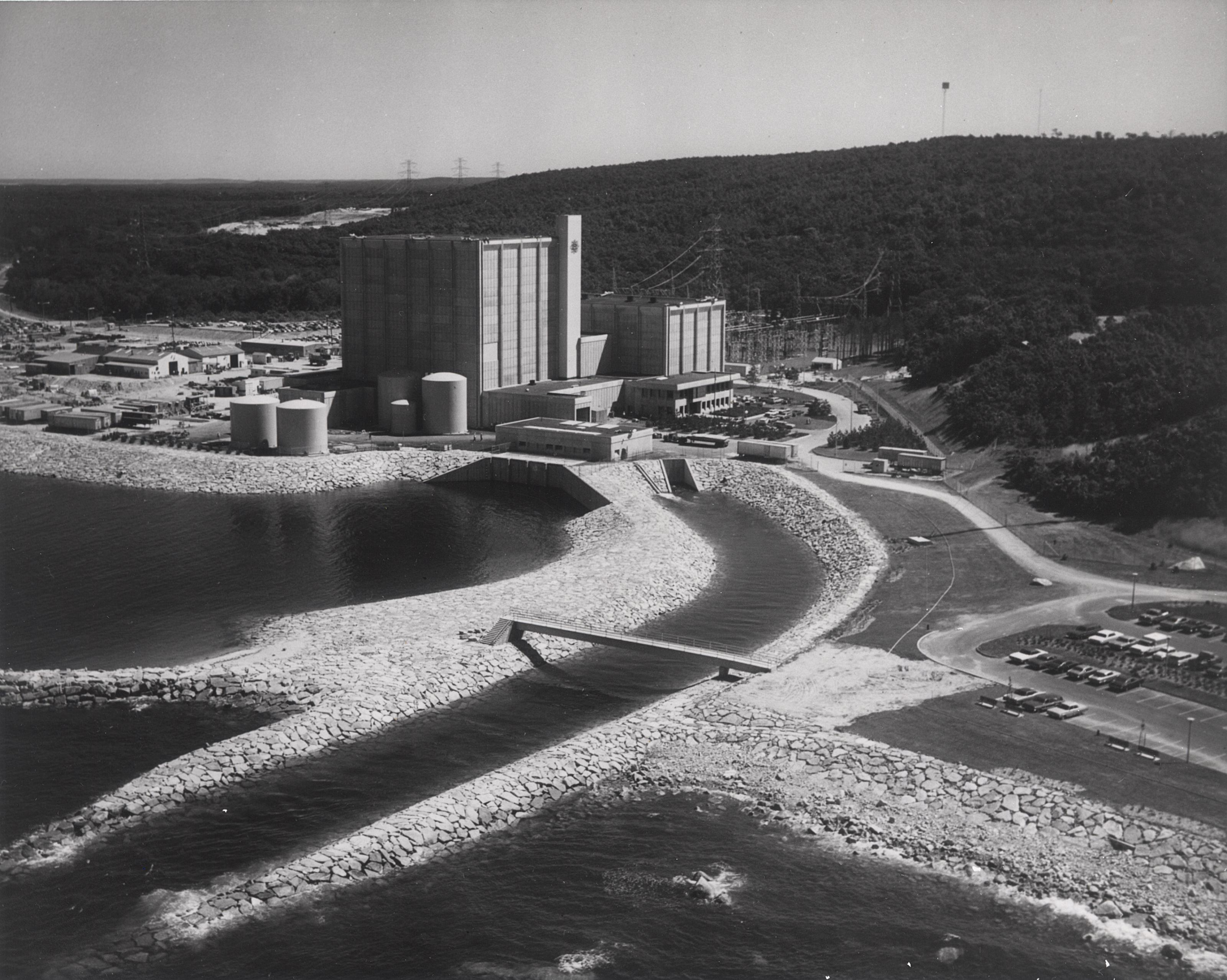
- Pilgrim Nuclear Power Station
- Country: United States
- Location: Plymouth, Plymouth County, Massachusetts
- Coordinates: 41°56.7′N 70°34.7′W
- Status: Being decommissioned
- Construction began: August 26, 1968
- Commission date: December 1, 1972
- Decommission date: beginning May 31, 2019
- Construction cost: $462.25 million (2007 USD)
- Owner: Holtec International
- Operator: Holtec Decommissioning International

Nuclear power station
- Reactor type: BWR
- Reactor supplier: General Electric
- Cooling source: Cape Cod Bay
- Thermal capacity: 1 × 2.028 GW_{th}

Power generation
- Units operational: 1 × 677 MW
- Make and model: BWR-3 (Mark 1)
- Units cancelled: 2 × 1.18 GW
- Nameplate capacity: 677 MW
- Capacity factor: 85.10% (2017); 70.6% (lifetime)
- Annual net output: 5.047 TWh (2017)

External links
- Website: Pilgrim Nuclear Power Station
- Commons: Related media on Commons

Pilgrim Nuclear Power Station (PNPS) is a closed nuclear power plant in Massachusetts in the Manomet section of Plymouth on Cape Cod Bay, south of the tip of Rocky Point and north of Priscilla Beach. Like many similar plants, it was constructed by Bechtel, and was powered by a General Electric BWR 3 boiling water reactor inside of a Mark 1 pressure suppression type containment and generator. With a 690 MWe production capacity, it produced about 14% of the electricity generated in Massachusetts.

On October 13, 2015, the plant's owners announced that it would close by June 1, 2019, citing "market conditions and increased costs," which would have included tens of millions of dollars of necessary safety upgrades. Following closure, decommissioning is expected to take decades for radiation to decay.

== History ==
Built at a cost of $231 million in 1972 by Boston Edison, the plant was sold in 1999 to the Louisiana-based Entergy Corporation, part of a complex deal that was the result of deregulation of the electrical utility industry.

On April 11, 1986, a recurring equipment problem forced an emergency shutdown of the plant. The US Nuclear Regulatory Commission (NRC) called it ″one of the worst-run″ nuclear plants in the country.

Pilgrim kept its spent nuclear fuel in an on-site storage pool, waiting for federal direction on the correct disposal process. The Yucca Mountain site in Nevada was being considered for this purpose until its deselection in 2009.

Pilgrim's original license to operate would have expired in 2012. In 2006, Entergy filed an application for an extended operating license (until 2032) with the NRC. In May 2012, the NRC approved the 20-year extension, with chairman Gregory Jaczko the lone dissenting vote.

Opposition to Pilgrim's license extension came mainly from Pilgrim Watch, a local group which filed numerous legal and procedural challenges. The state attorney general also raised questions about, among other issues, the dangers posed by the onsite storage of spent nuclear fuel.

In April 2013, the station increased its security following the Boston Marathon bombing.

In July 2013, the plant had to reduce output during a heat wave despite very high electricity demand, because the temperature of water drawn from Cape Cod Bay exceeded 75 °F, the limit set by the NRC.

On August 22, 2013, with the plant online at 98% power, two of the plant's main feedwater pumps tripped, causing a drop of the reactor water level. Operators inserted a manual SCRAM to shut down the reactor prior to the third feedwater pump subsequently tripping. The loss of feedwater and sudden trip from the high power level caused the reactor water level to drop below -46 inches. After passing this point, the emergency core cooling system automatically activated. Operators using the RCIC and HPCI systems promptly restored the reactor water level to normal. Ironically, it was found that the pumps tripped due to a design flaw in a recent SCRAM reduction program intended to make the pumps less likely to trip. Quick action by the operators prevented a more serious low-water incident. It was the first time in the station's history that reactor water level reached a low-low condition and activated emergency core cooling systems.

On January 27, 2015, the plant underwent an unplanned shutdown caused by the Winter Storm Juno. Following this event the NRC downgraded the Pilgrim Nuclear Power Station to Column 4 "Repetitive Degraded Cornerstone" of the NRC Action Matrix.

To ensure the safety of the plant, the NRC confirmed the commitment of Entergy to follow the Recovery Plan by sending a Confirmatory Action Letter (CAL) on August 2, 2017, which was regularly updated by follow up reports. As a result from inspections and completion of the CAL, the NRC transitioned Pilgrim Nuclear Power Station back to Column 1 "Licensee Response" as of March 4, 2019.

The plant was shut down on May 31, 2019 at 5:28 p.m. and began the process of decommissioning.

In August 2019, Entergy sold the station to Holtec International's subsidiary, Holtec Decommissioning International. Since then, Holtec Decommissioning International has been operating the plant, and decommissioning it. Holtec and Entergy believe that Holtec can complete the decommissioning and site release for alternate uses decades sooner than previously anticipated.

== Electricity production ==
Generation (MWh) of Pilgrim Nuclear Power Station
Year	Jan	Feb	Mar	Apr	May	Jun	Jul	Aug	Sep	Oct	Nov	Dec	Annual (Total)
2001	491,137	449,547	490,652	315,658	149,753	455,358	491,576	411,345	475,870	497,586	484,169	431,382	5,144,033
2002	497,784	452,918	492,733	481,927	493,183	460,816	466,456	493,256	461,774	496,480	480,311	491,128	5,768,766
2003	497,165	316,163	464,668	283,436	181,530	435,051	508,524	498,276	456,319	337,364	491,003	508,456	4,977,955
2004	512,970	479,839	455,553	494,514	510,344	489,062	502,238	507,669	480,302	506,741	487,798	511,570	5,938,600
2005	507,583	453,958	495,507	242,596	291,667	488,551	506,701	502,668	491,688	496,574	486,613	510,951	5,475,057
2006	475,558	461,696	417,109	492,887	508,402	479,200	507,333	498,435	487,899	501,301	491,784	508,054	5,829,658
2007	496,378	434,146	382,851	73,456	345,315	491,401	443,982	500,238	487,024	503,198	494,987	466,813	5,119,789
2008	511,679	478,576	510,487	448,398	506,841	484,157	507,534	496,811	487,785	502,739	492,357	441,275	5,868,639
2009	510,067	451,656	507,752	263,007	185,075	488,015	499,073	499,942	487,629	503,203	491,784	508,818	5,396,021
2010	509,476	460,217	505,149	492,103	496,145	489,418	496,441	497,437	485,461	497,636	485,472	502,858	5,917,813
2011	507,453	394,924	482,848	235,351	200,811	486,064	497,546	500,808	480,965	502,863	354,234	441,353	5,085,220
2012	506,958	468,256	504,978	489,186	442,317	477,496	491,625	497,598	485,638	505,011	483,192	507,285	5,859,540
2013	352,154	315,145	469,668	189,221	7,788	473,949	499,580	380,750	327,986	386,722	486,474	441,206	4,330,643
2014	508,677	459,371	502,304	491,227	413,473	482,972	506,160	426,297	486,567	499,872	492,016	500,218	5,769,154
2015	429,392	252,653	505,736	302,697	107,757	475,870	503,035	442,078	485,608	497,922	490,691	501,367	4,994,806
2016	508,090	402,912	498,382	489,091	495,025	471,322	501,420	397,177	297,304	490,224	488,314	375,057	5,414,318
2017	505,324	344,134	496,099	134,928	126,473	482,305	501,875	494,508	476,799	490,220	488,578	505,927	5,047,170
2018	393,142	455,535	82,968	114,483	443,221	436,915	491,071	390,998	308,016	372,125	448,844	504,245	4,441,563
2019	450,438	455,294	492,267	476,826	302,379	--	--	--	--	--	--	--	2,177,204

== Surrounding population ==
The Nuclear Regulatory Commission defined two emergency planning zones around nuclear power plants: a 10 mile (16 km) plume exposure pathway zone, concerned primarily with exposure to and inhalation of airborne radioactive contamination; and an ingestion pathway zone of about 50 miles (80 km), concerned primarily with ingestion of food and liquid contaminated by radioactivity.

In 2010, 75,835 people lived within 10 miles (16 km) of Pilgrim, an increase of 40.5% in a decade (according to an analysis of U.S. Census data for msnbc.com). 4,737,792 people lived within 50 miles (80 km), an increase of 10.2% since 2000. Cities within 50 miles included Boston (35 miles to city center).

== Environmental impacts on Cape Cod Bay ==
PNPS operated a single reactor unit with a boiling water reactor and a steam turbine generator. The cooling and service water systems operated as a once-through cooling system, with Cape Cod Bay being the water source. The water was circulated in the plant's heat exchanger in the same manner as any fossil-fuel powered power plant, using the seawater to remove heat from primary coolant away from sources of radioactive contamination. Approximately 480 million gallons of seawater were withdrawn daily from the bay through an intake embayment formed by two breakwaters, and then re-deposited into the bay causing a change in temperature at peak times (ΔT) of 3 °C (5.4 °F).

During that process, the greatest environmental impact to the bay occurred through impingement and entrainment (I&E) of sea organisms and species. Entrainment occurs when small aquatic life forms are carried into and through the cooling system during water withdrawals. Impingement occurs when organisms are trapped against cooling water intake screens or racks by force of moving water.

PNPS has been regularly monitoring I&E levels since 1974. They have reported I&E losses of millions of aquatic organisms each year. The EPA evaluated all species known to be impinged and entrained by the facility, including commercial, recreational, and forage fish species. Based on information provided in facility I&E monitoring reports, approximately 68 species have been identified in I&E collections since 1974, and 26 of these have commercial or recreational value.

During the license renewal process, the Nuclear Regulatory Commission found that the significance of the potential environmental impacts of renewal would be small, with the exception of marine aquatic resources. Due to I&E, the continued operation of the cooling water system would rarely have impact on the local winter flounder (Pseudopleuronectes americanus) population, and the Jones River population of rainbow smelt, and cumulative impacts on other marine aquatic species would be small to moderate.

After the aquatic organisms were impinged into the cooling system, they were discharged back into the bay as sediment. The resulting shadow effect killed plant and animal life around reactor discharge systems by curtailing the light and oxygen they need to survive; however, the intake and discharge canals remained a popular recreational fishing spot for local residents.

== Seismic risk ==
The NRC's estimate of the yearly risk of an earthquake strong enough to cause core damage to the Pilgrim reactor was 1 in 14,493, according to their study published in August 2010, making it the second-most-at-risk plant when it was still operating.
