= Mark Marderosian =

Comic book artist, illustrator etc. (b. 1955)

- Mark Marderosian (foreground) sketching for Free Comic Book Day attendees at "That's Entertainment", Worcester MA in 2008.
- Born: 1955 (age 70–71) Massachusetts, United States
- Areas: Comic book and book illustrator, toy designer, animator, editorial cartoonist
- Notable works: Many Walt Disney licensed children's books, such as Mickey's Wish: A Deluxe Super Shape Book (Walt Disney's Mickey and Friends) ISBN 0-307-13047-9 ISBN 978-0307130471; and Disney Princess: Jewelry Box (Disney Princess) (Hardcover) ISBN 0-7868-3604-0 ISBN 978-0786836048. "Drawing With Mark," a public-access television program.

Mark Marderosian (born 1955) is a prolific cartoonist, animator and children's book illustrator, a comic book artist and noted toy designer.

== Biography ==
=== Early life and career ===
Born in Cambridge, Marderosian grew up in Newton, Massachusetts. He started drawing when he was seven years old, inspired after his parents took him to see Pinocchio. After high school, Marderosian worked for advertising agencies and an art supply company, where he prepared paste-ups and mechanicals for catalogs. During this time, he also drew cartoons and comic strips, and freelanced for various magazines. In 1979, Marderosian enrolled at Massachusetts College of Art, where he earned a Bachelor's Degree in illustration.

Mark Marderosian created the Delta Tenn comic books for Paul Howley's Entertainment Publishing in 1987–88. He also worked with Howley on the design of a set of Classic Toys Trading Cards around the same time.

=== Disney years ===
After an early-career rejection, Marderosian "finally [got] his foot in the Disney door in 1990," working on merchandise related to Jessica Rabbit. Over the course of his career, Marderosian has gone on to illustrate several dozen movie and television tie-in books for Disney, as well as for Golden Books. He has also provided illustrations for other licensed merchandise such as character figurines, story books, and coloring books. Among the many characters he has drawn are Mickey Mouse, Mulan, The Little Mermaid, Hello Kitty, and Jimmy Neutron. He is most commonly recognized for his work on merchandise and books featuring the Disney Princesses. "Because of the constant reprinting, especially in coloring books, somewhere there's someone looking at something I drew every single day," said Marderosian.

=== Editorial cartoons ===
Marderosian began working as the editorial cartoonist for the Newton TAB in 2006. "There aren't as many editorial cartoonists in this country as there used to be and I'm happy to be able to practice my art and offer my opinions in this manner every week," he said.

=== Television ===
In 2007, Marderosian designed and successfully marketed his own collection of children's stuffed animals called "Angels from the Attic." Each toy set included a related story book.

In 2010, Marderosian and designer/animator Robert Palmer Jr. created a television program called "Drawing With Mark." Their children's media company, Big City Publishing, offered to provide the program free of charge to Public-access television cable TV stations. The show has been called "a simple, old-fashioned TV show... that teaches kids how to draw." His "Angels from the Attic" characters appear on the show in animated form. Within five months after airing the first episode, the program was accepted by 105 Public-access television channels that serve about 150 cities and towns across 25 states. "The show's overall theme is about helping kids unlock their creativity, especially in these days of brutal budget cuts on so many institutions, which are struggling to present creativity and art in various forms," Marderosian said.

In 2013, the Boston/New England Chapter of the National Academy of Television Arts and Sciences nominated "Drawing with Mark" for a Regional Emmy award in the Children's/Youth category.
