= That's Entertainment (comic shop) =

Store in Worcester, Massachusetts, U.S

Coordinates: 42.2655°N 71.8190°W

- Type: Private
- Industry: Comics; Pop culture Collectables
- Genre: Retail
- Founded: 1980; 46 years ago
- Founder: Paul Howley
- Headquarters: Worcester, Massachusetts, U.S.
- Number of locations: 2
- Area served: New England
- Key people: Paul Howley
- Products: Comics; Video games DVDs; Magic: the Gathering; Toys; Role-playing games Vinyl Record Albums; Trading Cards; Autographs
- Owner: Paul Howley
- Website: ThatsE.com

That's Entertainment is a comics and collectibles store with locations in Worcester and Fitchburg, Massachusetts. Founded by Paul Howley in 1980, the company sells comic books, collectibles, trading cards, games, toys, vinyl records, and related merchandise.

== History ==
Paul Howley opened That's Entertainment on April 15, 1980, in a 2,000 square foot storefront on Chandler Street in Worcester.

On October 12, 1989, a second location was opened after the purchase of a comic shop in Fitchburg, Massachusetts. At the start of business on July 1, 1992, That's Entertainment had been moved into its present location, a 20,000 sq ft (1,900 m^{2}) former auto dealership on Park Ave. in Worcester, and a 10,000 sq ft (930 m^{2}) retail and events space was created. The store stocks comic books, including alternative comics and new indie titles, trade paperbacks, and related items. The store also carries other trading cards, including sports cards and Magic: The Gathering, along with anime, role-playing games, vintage video games and systems, and other toys and collectibles.

In 1997, That's Entertainment was one of three stores that received a "Will Eisner Spirit of Comics Retailer Award" from San Diego Comic-Con. The award, named for comic book creator Will Eisner, recognizes "an individual retailer who has done an outstanding job of supporting the comics art medium both in the community and within the industry at large".

That's Entertainment's "reluctant acceptance of life after the on-line auction" was the subject of a six-page article in the May 2000 issue of the national magazine Inc. The article, by writer Anne Marie Borrego, was titled "How I Learned to Stop Worrying and (Almost) Love eBay." Borrego examined how That's Entertainment specifically, as a traditional brick and mortar collectibles retailer, was contending with the sudden growth of on-line competition in the collectibles market.

== Events ==
Illustrator David Wenzel at the store in 2012

On July 18, 1998, Harvey Ball, the earliest known designer of the Smiley, appeared at That's Entertainment to celebrate the 35th anniversary of the design's inception. Ball met fans and signed Smiley pins and art, as well as some copies of the Watchmen comic.

Television pioneer Rex Trailer appeared in 2006 to mark the 50th anniversary of Boomtown by meeting his fans, singing songs, and signing autographs. A video report on that event is posted to the Worcester Telegram website. In an encore of sorts, On September 11, 2011, Trailer appeared at the Fitchburg That's Entertainment to meet fans, sing songs and sign free autographs as he marked the 55th anniversary of Boomtown. Trailer sang a song he wrote to honor the victims of 9/11, I Appreciate You.

That's Entertainment has participated in the annual, worldwide Free Comic Book Day every year since the event was launched. In 2009, the store presented a "Pro-Am Comic Jam", inviting "aspiring artists of all ages" to meet with a group of professional artists to compare perspectives on comic art. It was the fourth occurrence of this event since 1996.

== Lois Lane ==
In March 2011, That's Entertainment petitioned the Worcester City Council to change the name of the private street running alongside the store from Marmon Place to Lois Lane. "Certainly the character Lois Lane - dating back to 1938 in Superman comic books, and moving on through radio shows, television shows, and movies etc. - is a high-profile, beloved and timeless icon," the petition stated. The Worcester Telegram opined that the proposed name was a good match for That's Entertainment "which, among many things, is in the superhero comic book business." On August 14, 2012, the petition, having previously passed the Planning Board and The City Council Public Works Committee, gained the final approval of the full council. In welcoming the change, The Worcester Telegram declared "a bit of whimsy in Worcester is a good thing." On Friday December 28, 2012, the new sign was finally installed. A celebration at the store followed on Sunday December 30, 2012, featuring an unveiling, free sketches of Lois by Paul Ryan, and a Lois Lane lookalike contest. In July 2018 the sign, along with the pole to which it was attached, went missing after it was taken down during sidewalk construction and left laid at the side of the building overnight. About one month later, the Lois Lane sign was discovered abandoned behind a nearby shopping plaza, and was returned to the store. The street sign was reinstalled by the Worcester Department of Public Works within a week's time.
