= Boomtown (1956 TV series) =

Television series based in Boston, Massachusetts

- Rare footage from the Boomtown show is included in Bavaro's documentary. © 2005 TrailMixx Pictures
- Starring: Rex Trailer
- Country of origin: United States

Production
- Production location: Boston, Massachusetts

Original release
- Network: WBZ-TV
- Release: 1956 – 1974

Boomtown was a children's show on WBZ-TV in Boston, Massachusetts, that ran Saturday and Sunday mornings from 1956 through 1974, and was hosted by singing cowboy Rex Trailer.

Trailer was hosting a children's series in Philadelphia for Westinghouse; when the series lapsed in 1956, Trailer was given a choice of two other Westinghouse stations: Cleveland or Boston. He chose Boston and signed a short-term contract to finish out his Westinghouse commitment, but the show ended up running for almost two decades.

WBZ launched Boomtown (as Rex Trailer's Boomtown) on April 28, 1956, as a two-and-a-quarter-hour Saturday morning series (7:45 to 10 a.m.). As originally conceived, the show was strictly a showcase for Trailer, who demonstrated trick riding and roping, sang cowboy tunes, and told western stories. Between Trailer's segments, the program presented old western films. Trailer named the show after the title of a Clark Gable film he saw on TV at the time. Though the original commitment was only for a few months, this series proved to be his greatest success, airing on WBZ for 18 years. It became so popular that it was expanded to three-hour slots on both Saturday and Sunday mornings.

The show expanded to a "peanut gallery" format as popularized on the Howdy Doody show: dozens of local youngsters became the studio audience as well as participants in the action. The first hour of the show always took place on a "bunkhouse" set, with no audience, where Trailer engaged in slapstick and improvised comedy with a sidekick, again a nod to the Howdy Doody format. The first sidekick was actor Dick Kilbride as Mexican-dialect buddy Pablo (1956-1967); after Kilbride's death he was replaced by actor Terrence Currier as bewhiskered Cactus Pete (1967-1969). Musician Bill O'Brien joined Trailer and Currier as cavalry soldier Sgt. Billy O'Brien. There was a practical reason for this indoor-studio segment. Although the kids at home were awake and ready to watch early, it would have been too difficult to have the young studio audience in place for that 7 a.m. opening.

Trailer would then mount his palomino horse, Goldrush, and (in a filmed introductory sequence accompanied by his dramatic song, "Hoofbeats") ride across a "prairie wide" onto the western-themed Boomtown studio set to interact with his live audience for the next two hours. Studio crews re-created the Old West on Soldiers Field Road in Brighton, with the familiar landmarks of an old western town: hitching posts, opera house, storefronts and jail.

With a natural ease and charisma, Trailer regularly demonstrated his considerable cowboy skills, which he picked up while spending his childhood summers on his grandfather's ranch in Texas. He also took part in skits and introduced the cartoons that rounded out the program. Trailer was aided by many guests, such as John MacFarland of the Franklin Park Zoo (for "Critter Corner"). Very occasionally, Boomtown would be broadcast from remote locations, like the May 7, 1961 episode at the Pleasure Island amusement park in Wakefield, Massachusetts.

In the live segments, Trailer presided over a series of audience-participation games and stunts, with prizes furnished by local merchants. One embarrassing episode had Trailer giving away a transistor radio emblazoned with a prominent Pepsi logo. Trailer said he had heard from parents asking if this was a real radio, and he demonstrated by turning the radio on. As the camera lingered on a close-up of the Pepsi logo, the radio (tuned to sister station WBZ-AM) was playing a Coca-Cola commercial. Trailer chuckled and explained, "These things happen when you're on live television." Another favorite stunt was having boys in the crowd wearing oversized long johns over their clothes, and having girls in the crowd stuff the suits with inflated balloons. Trailer would then take a pin and pop each balloon, while the crowd counted along with Trailer.

One recurring, memorable segment of Boomtown was set to the music of Hey, Look Me Over. Rex would appoint two children sheriff and deputy, and hand them a "wanted" poster showing another member of the studio audience thinly disguised. As the music played, the entire "posse" would march through the sheriff's office, waving for the camera (and for their families and friends watching; the segment ensured that every child had a chance to be on screen at least once). Trying for a prize, the young lawmen would attempt to pick out the person shown on the poster as he passed through the office.

Some 200,000 children appeared on Boomtown during its run, and another four million watched on TV or saw Rex at his many personal appearances across New England. Trailer essentially played himself, so he was never caught out of character: kind, quietly confident, eminently capable, and wholesome. Parents and children alike responded to Boomtown's subtle, integral messages encouraging respect for others and nature. Rex Trailer settled in the Boston area permanently where he remained a major local celebrity decades after the final episode of Boomtown aired. Trailer died in 2013.

Trailer opened and closed each installment of the show with a live rendition of the Boomtown theme, a song that is said to have been "as sticky as the molasses used for grandma’s cookies on the old frontier." His audience participated by miming the shooting of a pistol into the air as they raucously sang along to the refrain of "Boom... Boom... Boomtown!" The complete lyrics to the song, Boomtown, are:

Rex: Howdy there, folks, we're glad to meet you in
Crowd: Boom... Boom... Boomtown!

Rex: There's a bunch of folks who'd like to greet you in
Crowd: Boom... Boom... Boomtown!

Rex: You can bet we'll have lots of Western fun
And excitement for you.
We'll ride and rope, do a square dance and shoot a gun
And we'll sing a song or two.

Rex: Come along, folks, now we're gonna start the fun in
Crowd: Boom... Boom... Boomtown!

Rex: From six to sixty there's something for everyone in
Crowd: Boom... Boom... Boomtown!

Rex: So do-si-do and swing around,
Get your gal and promenade down to
Crowd: Boom... Boom... Boomtown!

Boomtown ran on WBZ-TV until the last day of 1974. Trailer and some of his associates later moved the show to a fledgling UHF station, Channel 25, but that station lacked the facilities to recapture the show's glory and audience. In the 1990s, Trailer and Sgt. Billy moved to cable television with a retrospective series called Boomtown Revisited.

Little footage exists of Boomtown because the shows were mostly broadcast live, and any segments that were recorded were routinely taped over after broadcast.

However, a documentary film titled Rex Trailer's Boomtown was produced by Milford, Massachusetts native Michael Bavaro. Bavaro used rare archival footage along with the memories of Boomtown fans to provide a nostalgic overview. The Emmy®-nominated film aired on WBZ-TV on June 18, 2005 with encore broadcasts on WGBH in 2010 and 2013, and is now sold in DVD format.
