= Rex Trailer =

American television personality

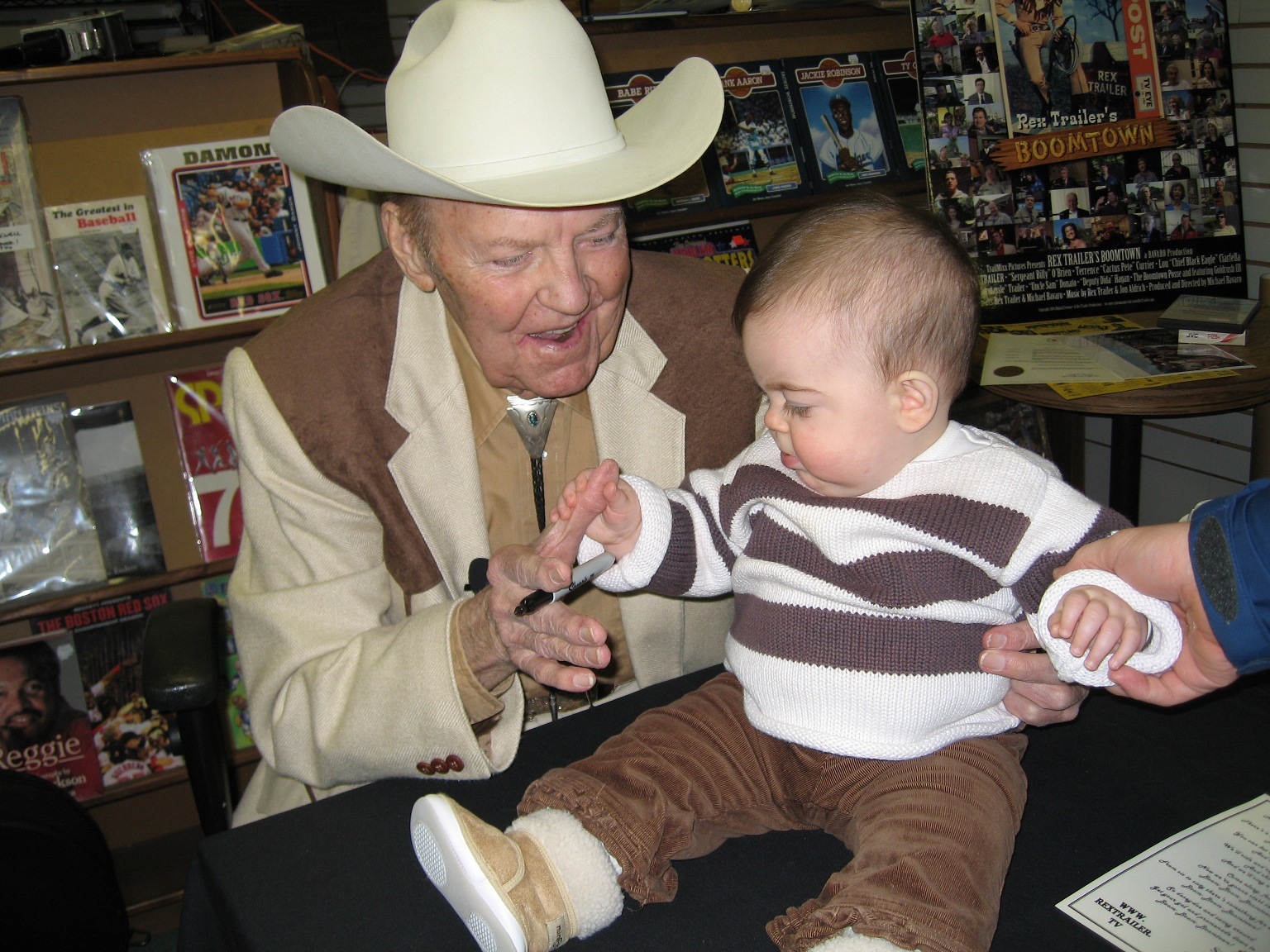
- Rex Trailer meets a young fan in Worcester, Massachusetts, on December 10, 2006
- Born: Rex Trailer; September 16, 1928; Thurber, Texas, U.S.
- Died: January 9, 2013 (aged 84); Miami, Florida, U.S.
- Occupations: Cowboy, actor, singer, film producer
- Years active: 1947–2013

Rex Trailer (September 16, 1928 – January 9, 2013) was an American regional television personality, broadcast pioneer, cowboy and Country and Western recording artist. He is best known as the host of the children's television show Boomtown which initially ran from 1956 through 1974.

== Early life ==
The hired hands on the ranch were rodeo cowboys. One of these men taught him trick roping, one taught him how to handle a bull whip, and another taught him how to play the guitar. Trailer recalls, "All those cowboys were good at what they taught me, but after I learned each (skill), I was the only one of the bunch who could do all three!"

As a young man in Texas, Trailer found other opportunities to employ his skills. At age 16 he started his own band, "The Ramblin' Rustlers", which performed locally. "I was always a ham who loved to perform", he said. "I could always play guitar, sing and tell stories." Trailer also began calling square dances.

At 18 years old, Trailer left Texas for the national rodeo circuit. "I traveled the country a little bit", Trailer reminisced. "The audiences got a kick out of a teenager being out there and trick riding and roping and bull whips and singing."

In 1948, Trailer was working in the traveling rodeo when he met Western movie star Gabby Hayes backstage at Madison Square Garden. That meeting proved to be life-changing. An impressed Hayes hired him to work at his Catskills summer ranch for kids as entertainment director. Trailer was the oldest child in a large family, and so was already practiced at engaging the young ones. Hayes, recognizing Trailer's rare natural talent over the course of that summer, encouraged him to break into the fledgling world of children's television as an on-air personality.

== Television pioneer ==
Souvenir photo of Rex and Goldrush. Boulevard Shopping Center, located at Cottman Ave. and Roosevelt Blvd. in Northeast Philadelphia, was the site of appearances by Trailer in the early 1950s.

Around 1947 Trailer, not yet out of his teens, had gone to work for the DuMont Television Network in New York City. He started out as a scenery painter, but quickly rose to the position of production coordinator, and soon after to assistant director. Then in 1949, acting on Hayes' advice to seek on-air work, he responded to a casting call for a cowboy who could do stunts; Trailer overwhelmed the competition and became the host of the network's Oky Doky Ranch (formerly The Adventures of Oky Doky). The show featured Trailer as a cowboy and Oky Doky, a cowboy puppet, operated by Dayton Allen.

The Oky Doky series was successful, but it ended when its production company went bankrupt. Dayton Allen went to NBC and soon joined the cast of the nascent Howdy Doody show. Meanwhile, Trailer heard that the Westinghouse TV station in Philadelphia (WPTZ) needed a host for a Western-style children's show. Trailer and his horse "Gold Rush" moved to Philadelphia and hosted a number of television shows from 1950 until 1956. "Ridin’ the Trail with Rex Trailer" featured him as the host for movie Westerns on Saturday mornings, with some live action segments featuring Trailer spliced in. "They sort of built me into the movie," Trailer explained. "The kids loved it because they never knew where or when I was going to show up in the action." He also had a daily 15-minute program featuring songs, games, dances, lore and lessons. This was the only one of the shows that was just Trailer and the kids; called "Hi-Noon with Rex Trailer," it ran from 1950 to 1955, achieving high ratings as it entertained the kids who came home from school for lunch. "Rex Trailer's Ranch House" was a half-hour variety show on Saturday nights. With its self-explanatory title, "Saddlebag O' Songs" was yet another show he hosted in that era.

== Recording artist ==
While his television career was continuing to advance, Trailer concurrently found success in recording Country and Western Music for ABC-Paramount Records, among other labels. At one time, around 1950, he recorded with Bill Haley and his Saddlemen, who gained fame later as Bill Haley and His Comets. In 1955, "Cowboys Don't Cry" and a song later used regularly on the Boomtown show, "Hoofbeats", were released together in the 78 rpm and 45 rpm vinyl record formats. Trailer released at least two 33 1/3 rpm 12" vinyl albums, as "Rex Trailer and the Playboys", one titled Country and Western in 1960 and one titled Good Old Country Music, released by Crown records (CLP 5484 monaural), date unknown. Another album with some overlap in playlists also exists, by "Rex Trailer and his Cow Hands", titled Western Favorites, which was released in 1961 on Spin-O-Rama records.

The 78 rpm version of "Hoofbeats" and "Cowboys Don't Cry".

In his later years, Trailer offered a CD through his website, called All the Best. "Boomtown", "Hoofbeats", "Cowboys Don't Cry", "Pow Wow the Pony" and other songs from the 1950s and 1960s were included, along with some more recently recorded songs. Trailer recorded introductions for each track.

Trailer was a featured guest on the 2002 eponymous Nate Gibson and the Gashouse Gang album. He played and sang on two songs written by Gibson, "The Remote to the T.V." and "Immaculate Confection," the latter being a tribute to Necco Wafers candy.

== The Boomtown/Boston years ==
The Philadelphia station that employed Trailer was sold to NBC. The young star, with short time remaining on his contract to Westinghouse Broadcasting, was presented a choice of two Westinghouse station cities as his next stop: Cleveland or Boston. In 1956, with a wealth of broadcasting experience and not yet out of his twenties, Rex Trailer chose the move to Boston to host a new weekend-morning children's show Boomtown on WBZ-TV. Trailer was already familiar with Boston, having performed as a specialty act when he traveled with big bands that played the Copley Plaza Hotel.

WBZ launched Boomtown (as Rex Trailer's Boomtown) on April 28, 1956, as a two-and-a-quarter-hour Saturday morning series. As originally conceived, the show was strictly a showcase for Trailer, who demonstrated trick riding and roping, sang cowboy tunes, and told western stories. Between Trailer's segments, the program presented old western films. Trailer named the show after the title of a Clark Gable film he saw on TV at the time. Though the original commitment was only for a few months, this series proved to be his greatest success, airing on WBZ through 1974. It became so popular that it was expanded to three-hour slots on both Saturday and Sunday mornings.

Boomtown established Trailer as a major (and enduring) local celebrity within the signal of Boston TV's Channel 4. Trailer performed songs while playing guitar, and showed off his authentic cowboy skills with horse-riding tricks, rope tricks, skilled use of the bullwhip, and shooting (though he banished weapons from the show after Robert F. Kennedy’s assassination in 1968).

Each episode of Boomtown opened with Rex Trailer on an indoor "bunkhouse" set, singing or engaging in comedy routines with a sidekick, in the manner of the popular Howdy Doody program. The first sidekick was actor Dick Kilbride as Mexican-dialect buddy Pablo (1956–1967); after Kilbride's death he was replaced by actor Terrence Currier as bewhiskered Cactus Pete (1967–1969). Musician Bill O'Brien joined Trailer and Currier as cavalry soldier Sgt. Billy O'Brien. The "bunkhouse" scenes were always pre-recorded in a studio. A film clip of Trailer riding his horse into town served as a transition from the bunkhouse to Boomtown, resembling an old western town with hitching posts, opera house, storefronts, and jail. Here the show was staged live, with dozens of kids in attendance. The young viewers "adored him for his consistent kindness and competence."

Trailer was aided by many guests, such as John MacFarland of the Franklin Park Zoo (for "Critter Corner"). Very occasionally, Boomtown would be broadcast from remote locations, like the May 7, 1961 episode at the Pleasure Island amusement park in Wakefield, Massachusetts.

The show's western films were replaced by Popeye the Sailor theatrical cartoons, and then by Hanna-Barbera's made-for-TV cartoons. In the live segments, Trailer presided over a series of audience-participation games and stunts, with prizes furnished by local merchants. One embarrassing episode had Trailer giving away a transistor radio emblazoned with a prominent Pepsi logo. Trailer said he had heard from parents asking if this was a real radio, and he demonstrated by turning the radio on. As the camera lingered on a close-up of the Pepsi logo, the radio (tuned to sister station WBZ-AM) was playing a Coca-Cola commercial. Trailer chuckled and explained, "These things happen when you're on live television." Another favorite stunt was having boys in the crowd wearing oversized long johns over their clothes, and having girls in the crowd stuff the suits with inflated balloons. Trailer would then take a pin and pop each balloon, while the crowd counted along with Trailer.

One of the show's weekly features was a masquerade, in which an appointed "sheriff" and "deputy" were shown a photo of a kid in a western disguise. Their job was to look at the faces of all the kids passing in review, and try to identify the one kid who had been disguised. The feature was not only a clever way to fill time on the air, but it gave every youngster in the studio a chance to appear on television.

Rex Trailer's fame, good reputation, and crowd-pleasing talents made him a dependable draw at many personal appearances in the area, with his TV sidekicks usually accompanying him. Additionally, he worked with a local travel agency, chaperoning children on an annual series of group school-vacation trips to California tourist attractions.

== As advocate ==
Rex Trailer was recognized as a strong advocate for children with disabilities. In 1961, Trailer (and Gold Rush) led an actual wagon train across the state of Massachusetts ending at the State House in Boston, to call public attention to the needs of those with intellectual disabilities, and the organization The Arc (then called the Association for Retarded Citizens). Trailer insisted on including children with disabilities in his show, and is said to have been one of the first to do so. In addition, Trailer also encouraged his young fans to hold neighborhood charity fund-raisers called "Backyard Carnivals Against Dystrophy", offering how-to kits on air. As a result of such efforts, Trailer came to be perceived as the "cowboy with a conscience" on and off the air.

Shooting live three-hour shows in the Brighton studio every Saturday and Sunday morning left Trailer little opportunity at that time to contemplate his place in television history. "We just did it. It was a blast," he said, adding that the show was the most enjoyable thing he'd ever done, because its genuineness made the fun contagious. "We were doing educational TV before there was educational TV," Trailer asserted. "Children need role models. I wanted them to understand their obligation to take care of each other."

When Boomtown ended on WBZ-TV, Trailer briefly put his Western costume aside and hosted Earth Lab, a syndicated science series that aired across the country until 1979. A second, short-lived run of Boomtown aired on WXNE-TV, Boston on Saturdays and Sundays for a year in the late 1970s. In addition to Rex Trailer himself, the WXNE-TV version of the show also brought back his sidekick Sgt. Billy, Uncle Sam Donato and the Boomtown Band, and added magician "Denver Dave," played by David Rich. Rich had been a one-time audience member of the show in the early 1960s. This iteration of the show was complemented by weekday afternoon "Good Time Gang" inserts, during which Trailer and other featured players of Boomtown introduced episodes of pre-produced children's programming and gave away prizes.

Rex Trailer was part of the successful "I Love New York" tourism campaign, playing a New Hampshire fisherman in a 1982 TV commercial. Trailer had a minor but memorable role as a doctor in the 1990 Cher/Winona Ryder movie Mermaids, saying to Ryder's character, "Then why did you think you were pregnant? You're still a virgin!" Later, he co-hosted Boomtown Revisited on Continental Cablevision in the early 1990s.

Besides his cowboy, musical and broadcasting skills, Trailer had other talents. He was a licensed pilot, having flown fixed wing craft including the Boeing 747 as well as helicopters and gliders, the latter at the (now defunct) Northeast Gliderport in Salem NH. He would often arrive at personal appearances at the controls of a helicopter, sometimes seasonally accompanied by Santa Claus. Once, Trailer was flying with Bozo the Clown (Frank Avruch) in his helicopter; engine trouble forced them down in a Western Massachusetts field, where they were greeted by incredulous children who had followed their descent. Trailer co-owned a helicopter shuttle company in the 1960s and 1970s that at its peak transported 500-600 passengers a day. He was an accomplished sky diver, scuba diver and water skier. Trailer also worked as a travel agent and was a certified hypnotherapist.

== Later career ==
In his later years, Trailer continued to work in the television industry. He owned a video production company in Waltham, Massachusetts, and taught on-air performance at Emerson College in Boston, both until his death. Among his past students are WHDH-TV Channel 7 news anchor Jonathan Hall, Fox 25 morning news host Gene Lavanchy, NESN sportscaster Bob Rodgers and Entertainment Tonight correspondent Maria Menounos. He made regular personal appearances, and performed on occasion, including sets at Boston rock clubs in his later years as a special guest. Trailer was also a perennial participant in Natick's annual July 4 parade, in which he rode Goldrush. Trailer's initial association with the parade ran from 1955 into the early 1980s; Trailer revived the tradition beginning in the early 1990s, continuing it each year until 2012. In 2013, he was named “grand marshal in memoriam” by Natick Friends of the 4th.

On December 10, 2006, Trailer performed several songs (including the Boomtown theme and some of his own Christmas songs) and signed free autographs for hundreds of fans at That's Entertainment in Worcester, Massachusetts. The event was part of Trailer's official "50th Anniversary of Boomtown" celebration tour. Then Worcester Mayor Tim Murray officially proclaimed it "Rex Trailer's Boomtown Day" throughout the city to mark the occasion, and Worcester City Councilor Frederick C. Rushton read the proclamation to the crowd.

In 2011, Trailer donated his three .45-caliber revolvers with staghorn handles to the Massachusetts State Police Museum in Grafton, Massachusetts. Just prior, the gun shop where Trailer was storing them had gone out of business. The guns very nearly went on the auction block before Trailer and Michael Bavaro learned of the situation and retook possession.

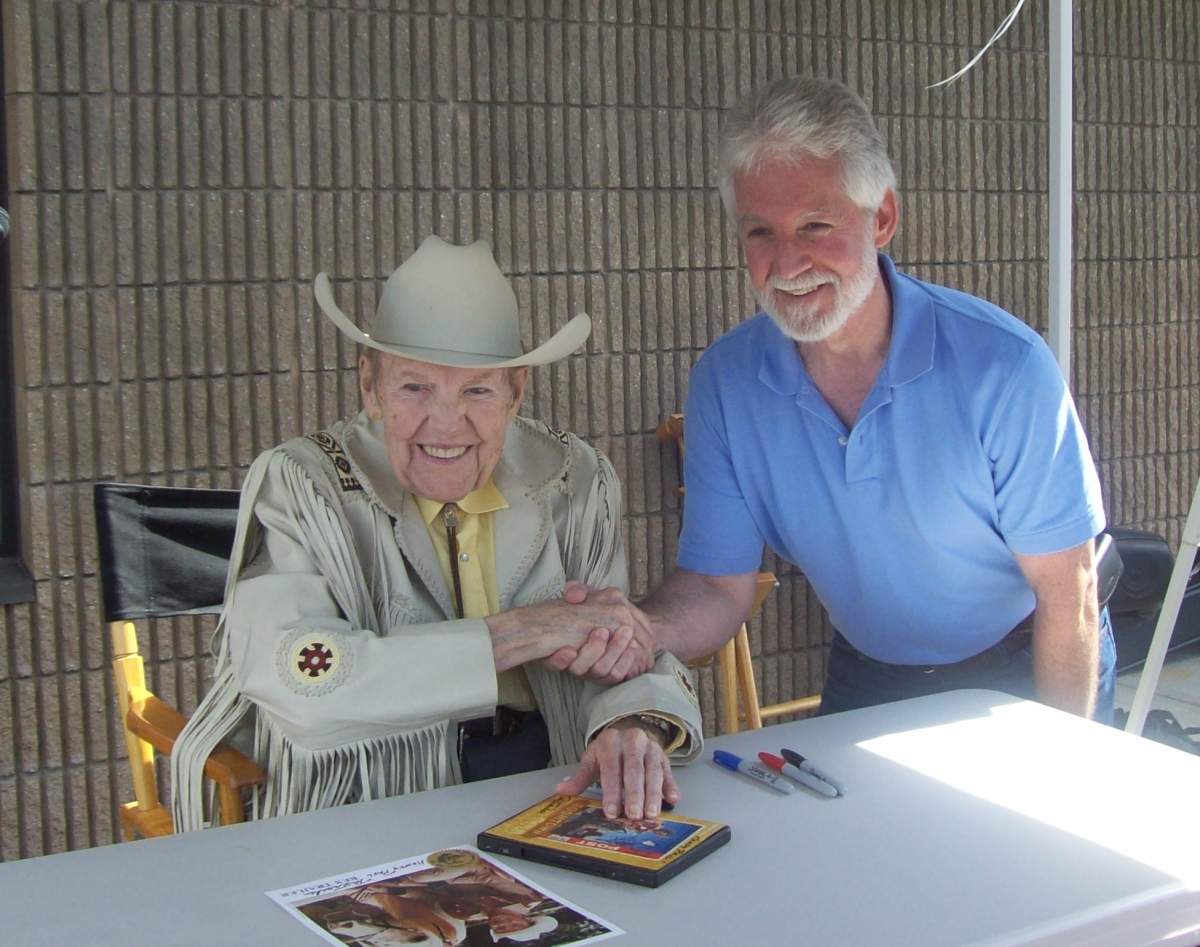
Trailer meets the artist for The Phantom comic strip, Paul Ryan, at That's Entertainment in Fitchburg, Massachusetts, on September 11, 2011.

On September 11, 2011, Trailer appeared at That's Entertainment in Fitchburg, Massachusetts, to meet fans, sing songs and sign free autographs as he marked the 55th anniversary of Boomtown. The appearance coincided with the tenth anniversary of the September 11 attacks, and Trailer sang a song he had written to honor the victims of 9/11, "I Appreciate You". He had first performed this song on 2002/09/10 at the Comedy Connection in Faneuil Hall. He explained the song's significance before that earlier event: "Ever since 9-11, the world has changed for all of us. We have to stick together, protect each other, and let those you love, respect, and admire know how much you appreciate them."

On December 18, 2011, Trailer wrapped up his 55th Anniversary Tour in Waltham, Massachusetts, at Café on the Common. Trailer debuted a long-lost Boomtown segment called “Pablo’s Used Cars,” which featured the physical comedy of Trailer's beloved sidekick, Pablo (actor Richard Kilbride).

In 2012, Trailer continued to appear at events in towns all around Massachusetts. On September 15, 2012, Trailer was at the Ayer Town Hall, where a gathering of fans joined him for his 84th birthday celebration.

== Family ==
Trailer's family remained largely out of the public spotlight throughout his career. Trailer was married to Karoline "Cindy" Trailer (maiden name: Waldron), a two-time beauty pageant winner, from 1956 until her death on May 30, 2011. They had one child, Jillian. Between raising her daughter and attending charity events, Mrs. Trailer had dedicated her time to helping people in need through volunteer work with hospitals and various organizations. She also gave her time to Friends of Animals as well as to animal shelters, and opened their Sudbury, Massachusetts home to many lost or abandoned pets.

His daughter Jillian Trailer said, “One of the most important lessons I learned from my father was to appreciate both big and small opportunities. Learn from the tough experiences and most of all appreciate every day of life.” She recalled that her father was much the same person in public and private life, and that he had a talent for making everyone feel special.

== Recognition and legacy ==
The retrospective book Rex Trailer: The Boomtown Years by Shirley Kawa-Jump was published in 1997.

Trailer was inducted into the Massachusetts Country Music Hall of Fame in 2000. He received the 2005 Governor's Award from the National Academy of Television Arts & Sciences, Boston/New England chapter and inducted into the Academy's Gold Circle in 2008 for 50 years of service to the broadcast industry in New England. He was included in the first group of honorees inducted into the Massachusetts Broadcasters Hall of Fame in Brockton, Massachusetts, on May 5, 2007.

A documentary film titled, Rex Trailer's Boomtown was produced by Milford, Massachusetts native Michael Bavaro. The film was broadcast on WBZ-TV on June 18, 2005, as a special and was nominated for a New England Emmy award for best historical documentary. Jay Leno, Jimmy Tingle, Mayor Tom Menino, Steven Wright and more than 100 grown-up kids share their Boomtown memories, and attest to the enduring stature of its host. The broadcast version of the film and archive material were presented to and are now part of the permanent collection at the Museum of Television & Radio in New York City. The film enjoyed an encore presentation on WGBH Boston on August 26, 2010.

Trailer was honored for his lifetime of contributions to people with mental and intellectual disabilities at the 50th anniversary Gala for The Arc of Massachusetts on September 10, 2005. In 2011, The Arc chapters in Massachusetts launched a statewide event called "All Aboard the Arc!" This bus caravan event was modeled after the wagon train led 50 years before by Rex Trailer. Trailer was honored at the 2011 event. The organizers note, "Sadly, his horse was not invited."

In March 2012, the Massachusetts tourism and cultural development committee endorsed Trailer's proposed designation as the state's "official cowboy." The bill, officially called S 1704, is sponsored by Senator Susan Fargo (D-Lincoln). Sen. Eileen Donoghue (D-Lowell), co-chair of the committee, said during the executive session, “His history and connection to Massachusetts is very strong. Not only is he a cowboy from Massachusetts, but he is a wonderful role model who gave a lot back.” On April 7, 2014, the bill, now sponsored by Fargo's successor, State Senator Michael Barrett, passed the Senate. “Long before PBS he was engaging kids in valuable ways. And long before The Americans with Disabilities Act he was determined to make his youthful audience inclusive,” stated Barrett. Barrett chairs the Senate committee on children, families and persons with disabilities.

Rex Trailer died in 2013, when he was visiting family in Florida for the holidays. He fell ill with pneumonia, and died on January 9 at the age of 84. Trailer's life was celebrated at a memorial service held at Cutler Majestic Theatre at Emerson College on March 12, 2013. The Rex Trailer Memorial Fund was established to support the causes the man championed.

Comedian Jay Leno eulogized his boyhood hero: “I’ve met a lot of people, a lot of important people, but no bigger star than Rex.”
