= Priscilla Beach Theatre =

Barn theatre in Massachusetts

Coordinates: 41°55′58.10″N 70°33′58.84″W

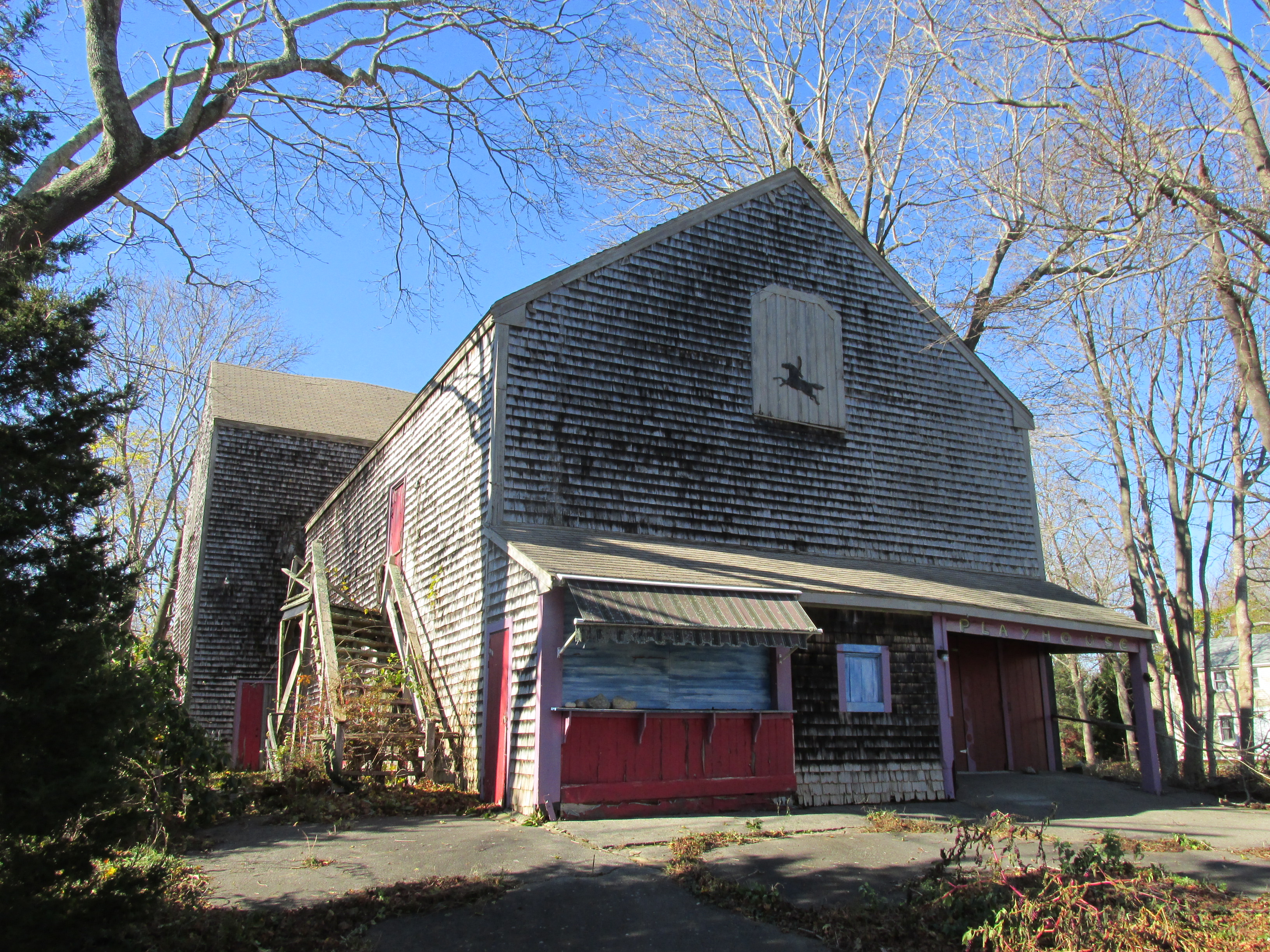
An Image of Priscilla Beach Theatre

Priscilla Beach Theatre ("PBT"), located in the Manomet section of Plymouth at Priscilla Beach, was one of the original barn theatres in America. It was founded in 1937 by Dr. Franklin Trask. His wife, Agnes, became PBT's first artistic director. In addition to the 240-seat barn theatre, the original complex included several cottages, residences, dormitories, a mansion, carriage house and athletic field. The unique "learn-by-doing" training at PBT offered thousands of young acting students the opportunity to learn nearly every aspect of theatre training from fencing, dance and directing to make-up, lighting and set design.

During the 1940s and 1950s, PBT featured well-known guest stars in student productions. These luminaries included Edward Everett Horton, Veronica Lake, Charlie Ruggles and Gloria Swanson. During this era, as many as 150 actors and actresses were in residence, usually performing in one play during the evening, while rehearsing another play during the day. Also, many famous students grew from a rising crop of young talent, including Paul Newman, Robert MacNeil, Estelle Parsons, Pat Carroll, Sandy Dennis, Mike Todd, Jr., Dan Blocker, Jean Seberg, poet Daisy Aldan and Jan Scott, Emmy Award-winning art director.

During the 1960s, James Lonigro (stage name Geronimo Sands), replaced Mrs. Trask, becoming PBT's new artistic director. During his tenure, a new breed of talent emerged from the rigorous summer-stock training ground at the famous theatre school. This group includes Rob Reiner, Al Brooks, André Bishop (founder of Playwrights Horizons and Artistic Director of Theatres at Lincoln Center), news legend Andy Lack (former president of NBC News, producer of "60 Minutes", former CEO of Sony BMG and current CEO of the Bloomberg LP multimedia group), Curtis Sliwa (founder of the Guardian Angels), Jennifer Coolidge, Kitty Winn and Corey Carrier. During the 1970s, PBT was leased to Tufts University and, under the direction of Tony Award-winning producer Mitch Maxwell, saw Peter Gallagher on the barn stage.

Author and composer Rick Besoyan wrote "Little Mary Sunshine" while at PBT. Entertainer Mickey Rooney cited PBT as being the inspiration for the story and motion picture of "Babes in Arms", in which he starred alongside Judy Garland. Robert MacNeil praises Priscilla Beach Theatre on the popular PBS program, "Do You Speak American?" for helping him manage his Canadian accent.

PBT alumni have won (at least): four Academy Awards (Oscars), nine Tony Awards, three SAG Awards, four Golden Globes, six Golden Laurel Awards, a People's Choice Award, three New York Film Critics' Circle Awards, two Cannes Film Festival Awards, 15 Emmy Awards and, is represented by five stars on Hollywood's Walk of Fame.

In February 2013, the Priscilla Beach Theatre was purchased by Bob and Sandy Malone. In the following two years, the barn was renovated and restored, with the first production back in the barn in July 2015 (Fiddler on the Roof).
