= Michael Bavaro =

American film director

Michael Bavaro is an American filmmaker.

In 2010 Bavaro made a one-hour documentary film about the original Filene's Basement in Boston titled, "Voices from the Basement." It premiered on May 10, 2010 in the rooftop ballroom of the Omni Parker House in Boston.

Filmmaker Michael Bavaro was one of those kids who watched Rex Trailer on TV, thought it was real and never forgot the memory of its magic. "I grew up in Milford, Massachusetts and Boomtown was one of my first memories," he recalls. "I really believed it was the Wild West." He credits the show with sparking his interest in film and television.
