= Cape Cod Bay =

Large bay of the Atlantic Ocean adjacent to the U.S. state of Massachusetts

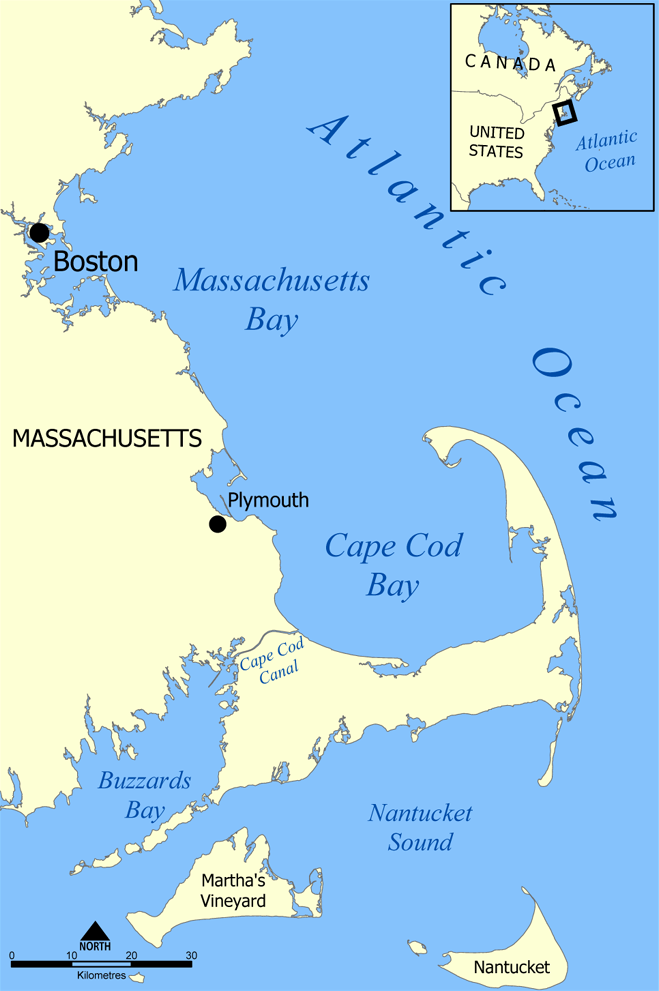
A map showing the location of Cape Cod Bay.

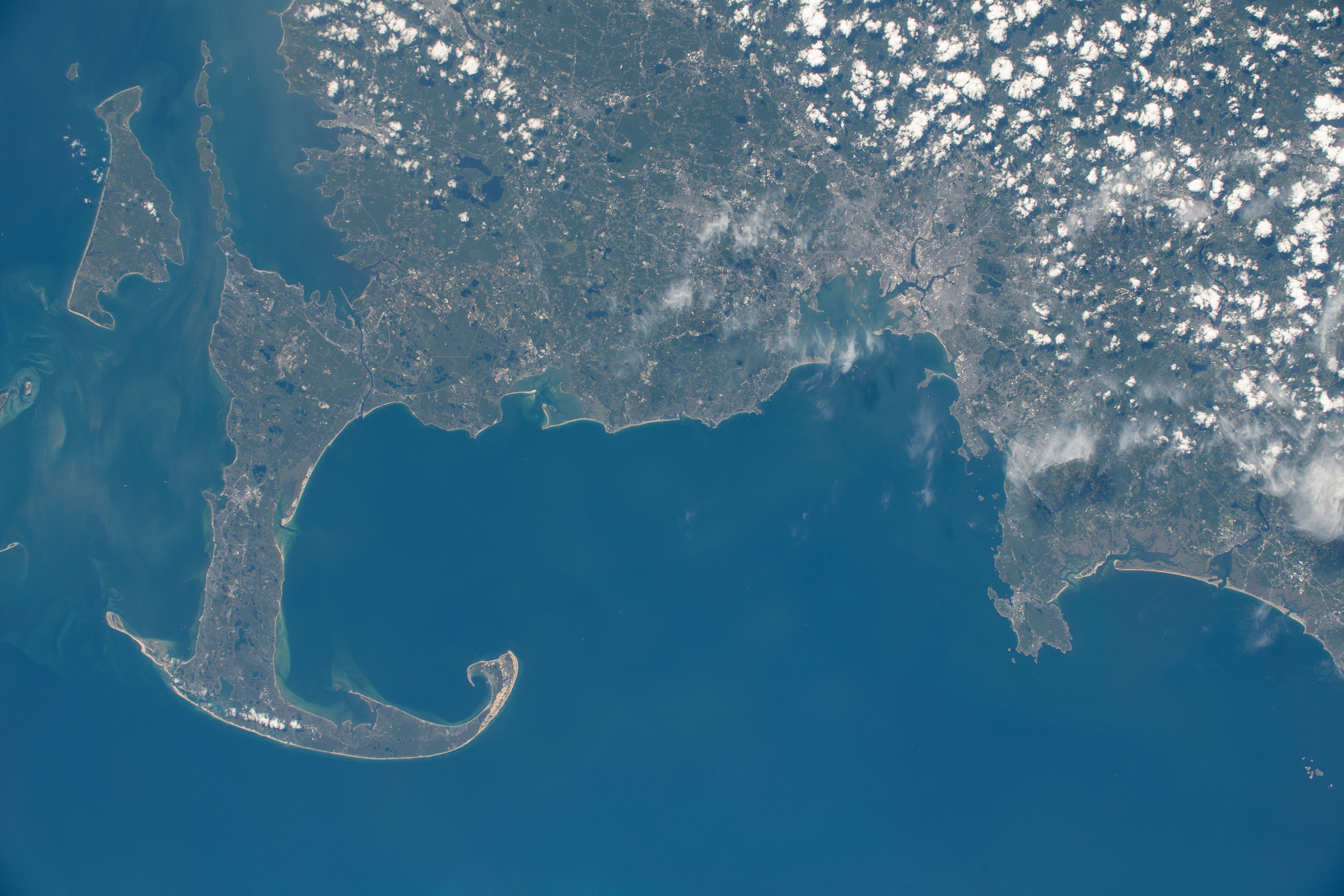
Cape Cod, Cape Cod Bay, and Massachusetts Bay, north is oriented to the right in this photo taken from the International Space Station on June 15, 2022

Cape Cod Bay from a beach in Dennis.

Cape Cod Bay is a large bay of the Atlantic Ocean adjacent to the U.S. state of Massachusetts. Measuring 604 square miles (1,560 km^{2}) below a line drawn from Brant Rock in Marshfield to Race Point in Provincetown, Massachusetts, it is enclosed by Cape Cod to the south and east, and Plymouth County, Massachusetts, to the west. To the north of Cape Cod Bay lie Massachusetts Bay and the Atlantic Ocean. Cape Cod Bay is the southernmost extremity of the Gulf of Maine. Cape Cod Bay is one of the bays adjacent to Massachusetts that give it the name Bay State. The others are Narragansett Bay, Buzzards Bay, and Massachusetts Bay.

== History ==
In 1524, Italian navigator Giovanni da Verrazzano was the first European to discover Cape Cod Bay, his claim proved by a map of 1529 which clearly outlined Cape Cod. In 1620, the Pilgrims first sheltered in Provincetown Harbor where they signed the Mayflower Compact, the first democratic document signed in the New World.

On May 30, 2026, a 5-foot diameter meteorite crash-landed roughly 10 miles off the Cape. It traveled at 42,000mph, heading from northeast to southwest in direction. It landed between Plymouth, Provincetown and Barnstable.

== Geology ==
Most of Cape Cod is composed of glacially derived rocks, sands, and gravels. The last glacial period ended about 12,000 years ago. During the end of the last glaciation, Cape Cod Bay was probably a large freshwater lake with drainages across Cape Cod in places like Bass River and Orleans Harbor. The Provincetown Spit, i.e., the land north of High Head in North Truro, was formed by marine deposits over the last 5,000-8,000 years. These deposits created Provincetown Harbor, a large, bowl-shaped section of Cape Cod Bay. Generally, currents in the Bay move in a counter-clockwise fashion, moving south from Boston, to Plymouth then east and then north to Provincetown. Strong tides flow water into the Bay, cleansing the system with nutrient-rich sea water and maintaining a well-mixed marine environment that helps to maintain a generally healthy and productive system by exchanging roughly 9.3% of the total bay water volume on a regular basis. Surface water stratification and mixing have a distinct seasonal cycle in the Bay. In the winter, the density of bay water is nearly the same from top to bottom, allowing it to mix readily and become nutrient-rich all around. Stratification occurs when the surface water becomes warmer and less thick than the deeper water in the spring, summer, and early fall. Because the water is stratified and rich in nutrients in the spring, biological productivity in the bay is at its peak.

Since 1914, Cape Cod Bay has been connected to Buzzards Bay by the Cape Cod Canal, which divides the upper cape towns of Bourne and Sandwich.

== Ecology ==
The sea life of Cape Cod Bay is quite varied and healthy. Fish that call the bay home include Bluefin Tuna, Striped Bass, Bluefish, Flounder, and Atlantic Mackerel. Sea mammals also live in Cape Cod Bay (seals, dolphins and whales). Cape Cod Bay has a diverse range of coastal and marine ecosystems, making it ecologically rich. Beaches, marshes, and offshore water provide critical habitats for plant and animal ecosystems, including commercially valuable fin-fish and shellfish, as well as endangered marine animals and birds. The bay's natural resources are used by endangered bird species like the roseate tern and the piping plover. The North Atlantic right whale, which is severely endangered, feeds in Cape Cod Bay. From April to December, humpback whales travel to Cape Cod Bay and nearby seas to feast on schooling fish.

The Pilgrims shot at a whale unsuccessfully while they were anchored in Provincetown Harbor in 1620.

== Water resources ==
Cape Cod has abundant water resources. These resources include both saltwater and freshwater. Below is a list of the most important resources.

=== Coastal waters ===
The Atlantic Ocean, Nantucket Sound, Vineyard Sound, Buzzards Bay, and Cape Cod Bay form a 559-mile coastline that surrounds the majority of the Cape. There are 53 saltwater embayments along this extensive stretch of coastline, each of which is formed by a depression or dip in the coastline that forms a bay abutting the ocean. Estuaries are where rivers and the sea meet. Freshwater, brackish, tidal wetlands, and tidal channels are all found in estuaries. Rivers, streams, and groundwater pour into the ocean's estuaries and embayments on Cape Cod.

=== Freshwater bodies ===
The Cape is home to more than a thousand lakes. Nearly 11,000 acres are covered by 996 freshwater ponds and lakes, with individual ponds and lakes ranging in size from less than one acre to 735 acres and 166 "big ponds" of 10 acres or more. Groundwater supplies the Cape's ponds and lakes. Groundwater can flow into and out of ponds thanks to the Cape's sandy soils. As a result, pond pollution is likely to pollute groundwater and vice versa.

=== Groundwater ===
The Cape's lifeline is groundwater. Rain and melting snow swiftly sink into the sandy soils, where it pools to form a massive subterranean groundwater reservoir beneath the majority of the Cape. Groundwater continues to flow into and out of ponds, feeding streams, and flowing towards the coast, finding sea level when it enters our estuaries and embayments, as water seeks the lowest elevation. Drinking water comes entirely from groundwater. This sole-source aquifer, which is protected by local, regional, state, and federal restrictions, provides all of the Cape's drinking water.

=== Watersheds ===
Watersheds connect nearly all of the Cape's waters, fetching water and releasing it into the ocean. There are 101 watersheds on Cape Cod that discharge into the ocean. 53 of them flow into embayments, which are vulnerable to nitrogen contamination, while the others discharge directly into the ocean. The Cape Cod Commission produced a regional framework for protecting and improving water quality and tracks progress in implementation through the Section 208 Water Quality Management Plan for Cape Cod.

== Fishing ==
Cape Cod Bay is a world class fishing destination for many anglers. Popular fishing methods used to fish Cape Cod bay include trolling, live bait fishing, light tackle fishing, and fly fishing. Fisherman typically fish off the coast of the South Shore (Massachusetts) and inner cape for fish such as Blue Fish, Cod, Flounder, Striped Bass, Bonito, Tuna, Mackerel, Pollock, Haddock, and even Sharks.

Fishing season typically takes place between May and October. Although plenty of fisherman prefer to fish from shore rather than a boat, Massachusetts requires a Recreational Saltwater Fishing Permit for anyone 16 years of age or older.

Many coastal towns have fishing piers, and boat charters that provide daily trips into Cape Cod Bay to catch fish. The most popular bait used is sea clams, and live mackerel.

== Threats to Cape Cod Bay ==
=== Pollution and water quality ===
Per the Cape Cod Commission, the bay is experiencing water problems. Although nutrients like nitrogen are an important aspect of aquatic ecosystems, excessive amounts can damage water systems. Cape Cod's estuaries are vulnerable to the effects of excess nitrogen due to a number of factors. Nitrogen is poisoning the saltwater barrier that has characterized the peninsula. On Cape Cod, centralized wastewater treatment plants are not extensively employed due to the expense and challenges associated with widely spread housing, as well as huge seasonal fluctuations in population due to summer tourists. Typical backyard sewage systems, which are not aimed at eliminating nitrogen, are responsible for an estimated 80% percent nitrogen dumping on Cape Cod Bay. The circumstances it generates devastate animal habitat and frequently violate water quality requirements, resulting in fish kills and decreased shellfisheries, among other things. The consequences of this pollution must be carefully managed. Another big issue affecting our coastal waters is polluted runoff. Contaminants collected up in precipitation and melting snow are eventually dumped into the bay, resulting in this sort of pollution. Fertilizers and other lawn and garden chemicals, pet waste, salt from streets, and oil and gasoline leaking from autos are all possible contaminants picked up in runoff.

=== Harmful Algal and Cyanobacteria blooms ===
Pollution's effects have already been seen in our coastal waters. Excess nutrient input from both point and non-point sources leads to high levels of plant growth, in addition to the direct, harmful impacts of pollution. This process, known as eutrophication, is taking place in Cape Cod Bay to some extent. In the bay, excess nutrients originate mainly from human sources and activities, such as waste systems for example. With the harmful increase of these nutrients comes an increase in algae and bacteria. Phaeocystis blooms are common in Cape Cod Bay during the spring. A bloom of this phytoplankton has far-reaching consequences, including out-competing other beneficial phytoplankton species, impacting zooplankton growth and productivity, and killing off fish species. Alexandrium, another species found in Cape Cod Bay, is responsible for red tides, which bring in harmful toxins, and has been the cause of death for fish, birds, mammals, and sometimes humans as a result. Shellfish that consume toxic phytoplankton become hazardous themselves, posing a risk to humans who consume infected shellfish and wreaking havoc on the shellfishing business. It is important to control HAB's and bacterial communities. Algal blooms deplete oxygen in the water, release toxins, and produce a terrible taste and odor. Algae will continue to grow if not treated, disturbing an ecosystem's natural equilibrium, and can severely deplete water quality, potentially causing illness in our biological communities and humans.

== Brewster Flats ==
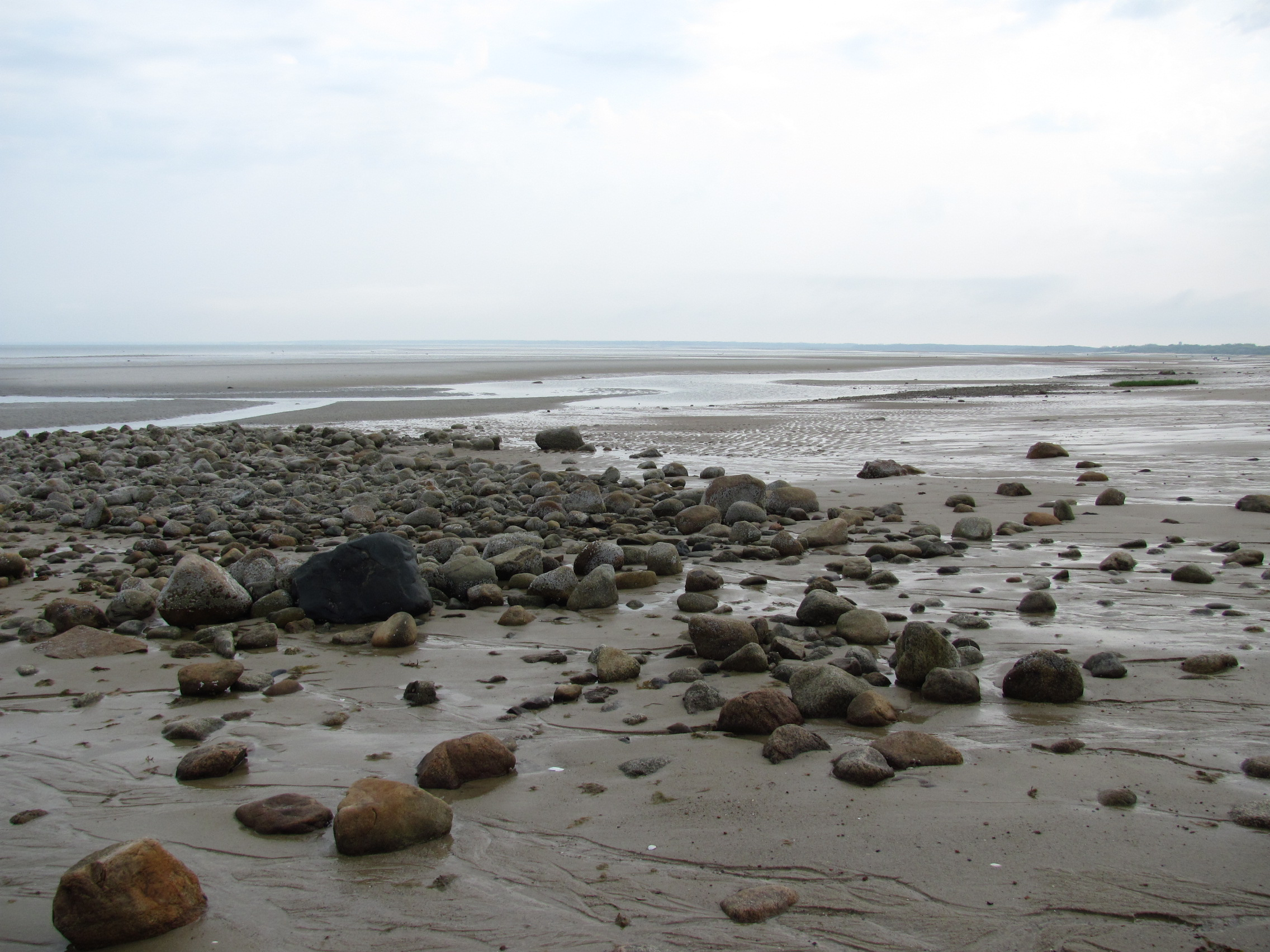
The tidal flats in East Brewster

The Brewster Flats (41°46′46″N 70°3′40″W) are tidal flats on Cape Cod Bay, particularly near the town of Brewster, and are a unique environment. They are the widest expanse of tidal flats in North America, rivaled in the western hemisphere only by a similar expanse in Brazil.

== View ==
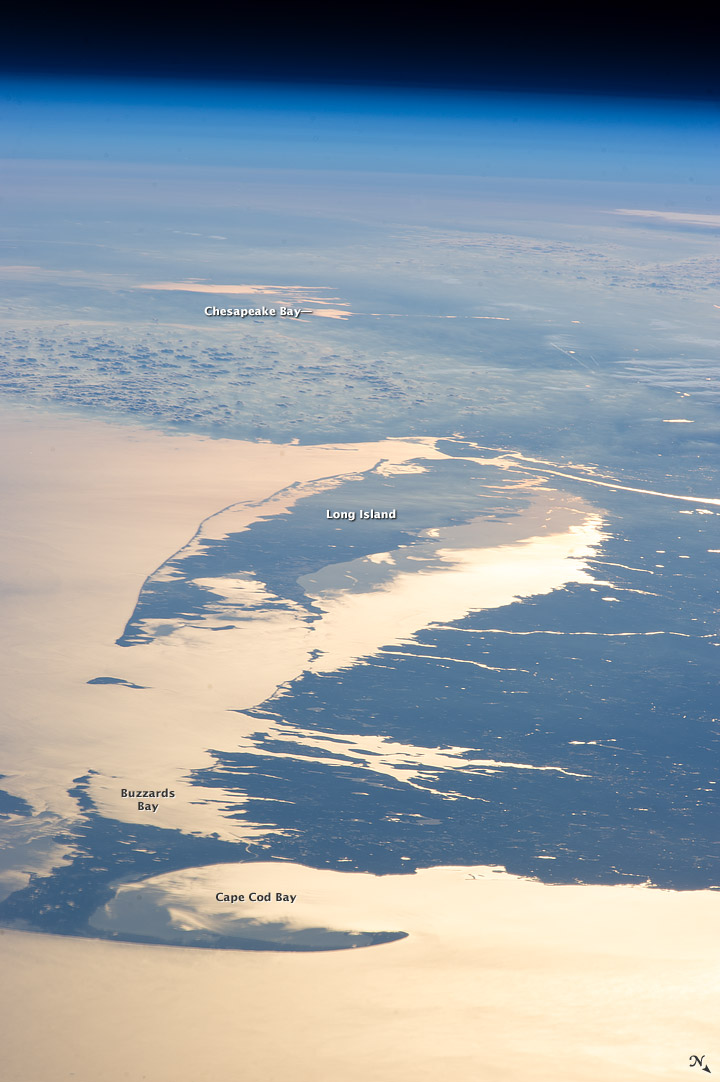
Cape Cod Bay from space
