= 33 Yonge Street =

Berczy Square
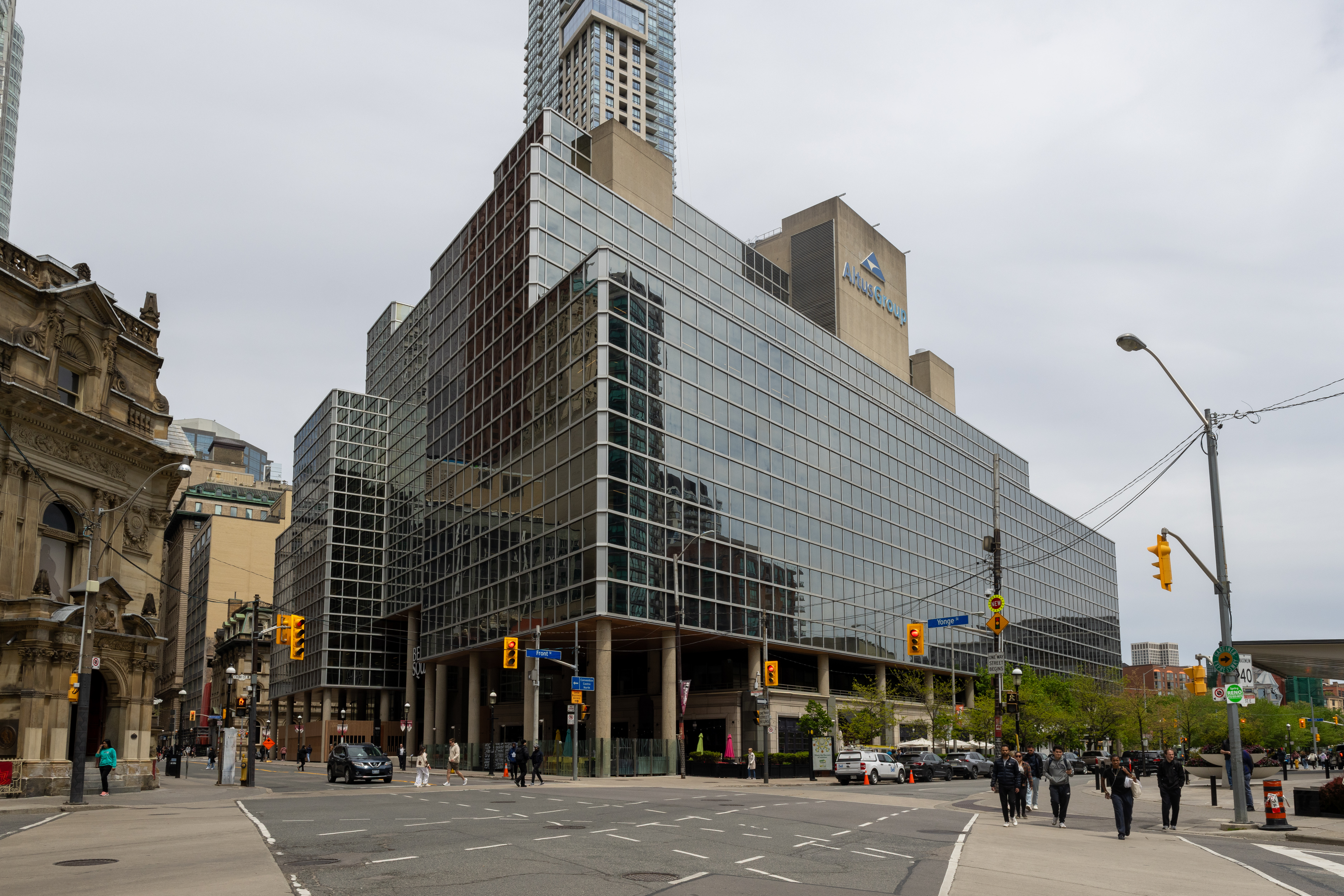
- Berczy Square in 2026
- Interactive map of the Berczy Square area
- Former names: A.E. Lepage Building, EDS Building
- Alternative names: 33 Yonge Street, Altus Group Building

General information
- Status: Completed
- Type: Office, Retail
- Location: Toronto, Ontario, Canada, 33 Yonge Street
- Coordinates: 43.647467°N 79.376950°W
- Current tenants: Altus Group
- Completed: 1982
- Owner: Great-West Life Canadian Real Estate Investment Fund No.1 London Life Real Estate Fund

Design and construction
- Architecture firm: WZMH Architects
- Developer: Canlea Ltd. Rostland Corporation

33 Yonge Street, or Berczy Square (previously the A.E. Lepage Building or EDS Building) is a 13 storey office and retail building bounded by Yonge Street to the West, Wellington Street to the North, Front Street to the South, and Scott Street to the East. The building was built in 1982, by developers Canlea Ltd. and Rostland Corporation, and was designed by WZMH Architects. The building was constructed by Eastern Construction Company Ltd. The building is currently owned by the Great-West Life Canadian Real Estate Investment Fund No. 1 and the London Life Real Estate Fund. The property is managed by GWL Realty Advisors.

== History ==
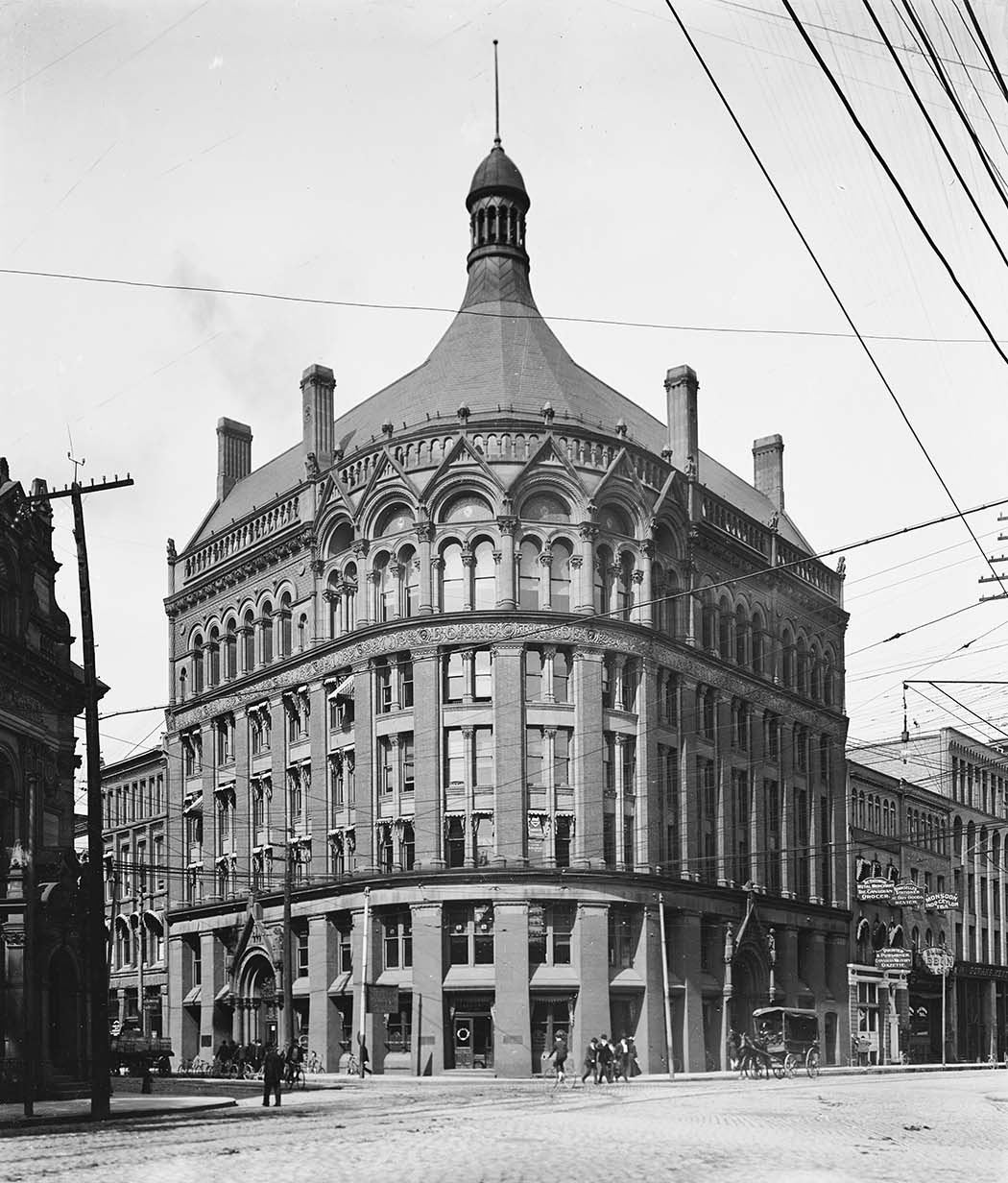
The former Toronto Board of Trade building that once stood at the site of 33 Yonge Street

Where 33 Yonge Street now stands, the Toronto Board of Trade Building originally stood. The Toronto Board of Trade Building was one of the first skyscrapers in Toronto, which stood 6 floors tall, and was built in 1892. It housed the Toronto Board of Trade, as well as the headquarters for the Toronto Transit Commission (TTC). The building was later demolished in 1958, which turned the site into a parking lot for several years. The site also had several other buildings which were demolished around the same time. Later in the early 1980s, construction began for 33 Yonge Street, and was completed in 1982. It was first known as the A.E. Lepage building, later the EDS Building, and now the Altus Group building. The building is undergoing renovation and has been rebranded to Berczy Square.

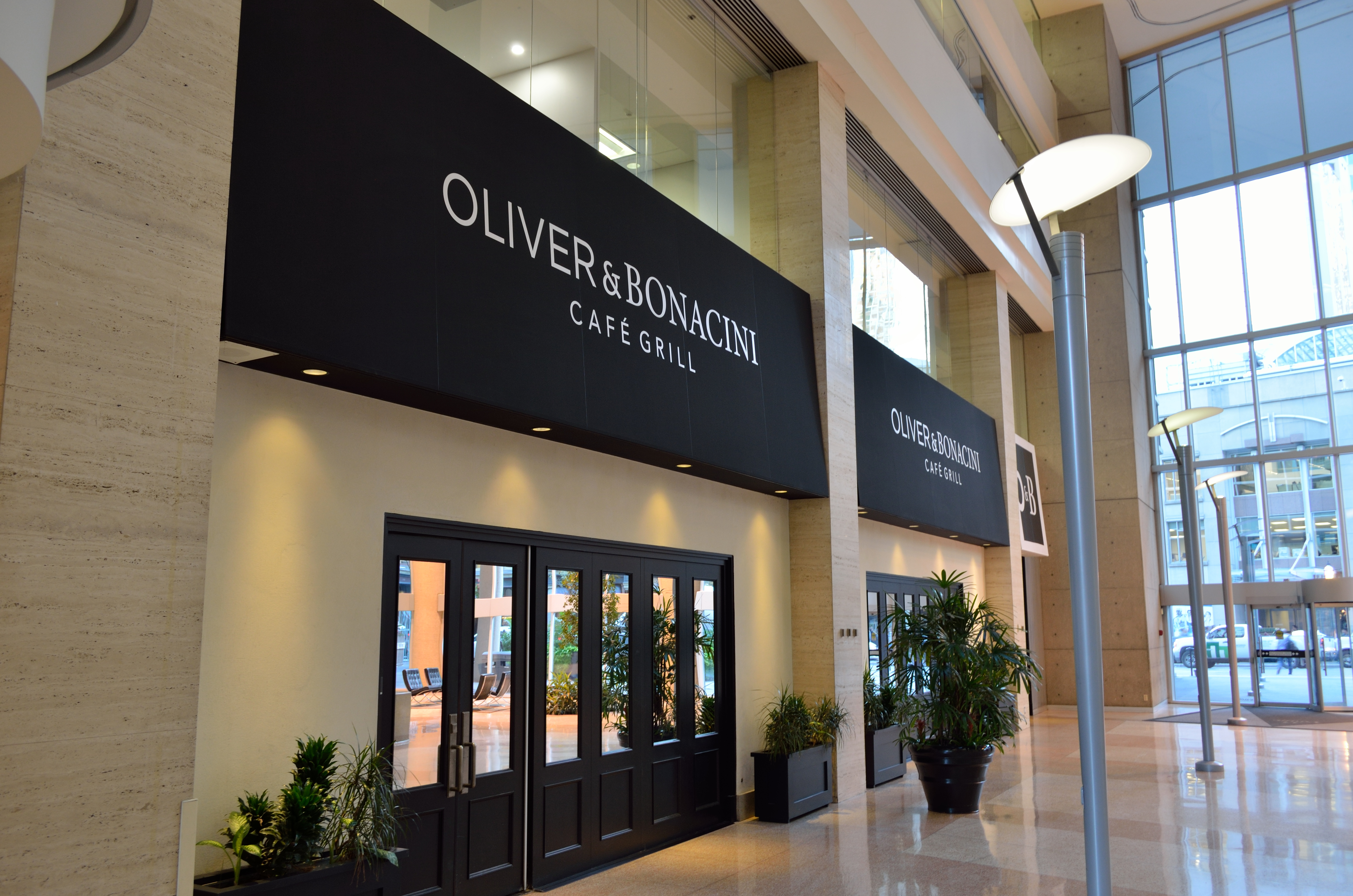
Oliver and Bonacini restaurant inside the atrium of 33 Yonge

== Description ==
The building stands 13 floors tall, and has 553,032 sf of office space. ] The ground floor includes retail space with several restaurants and service-oriented businesses that support tenants and visitors. The building also features a central atrium that allows natural light to enter the lobby area, creating an open interior space and improving daylight within the lower levels of the structure.

== Renovation ==
As of 2025, 33 Yonge Street is currently undergoing renovation, along with a rebranding to Berczy Square.

== See also ==
- Toronto Board of Trade Building
