= Milford granite =

Milford granite may refer to:

- Milford pink granite, a pink or grey granite from Milford, Massachusetts
- Kitledge granite, a light grey granite from Milford, New Hampshire
