= Fletcher Granite Company =

Granite quarry in Westford, Massachusetts

Coordinates: 42°37′49.56″N 71°24′55.58″W

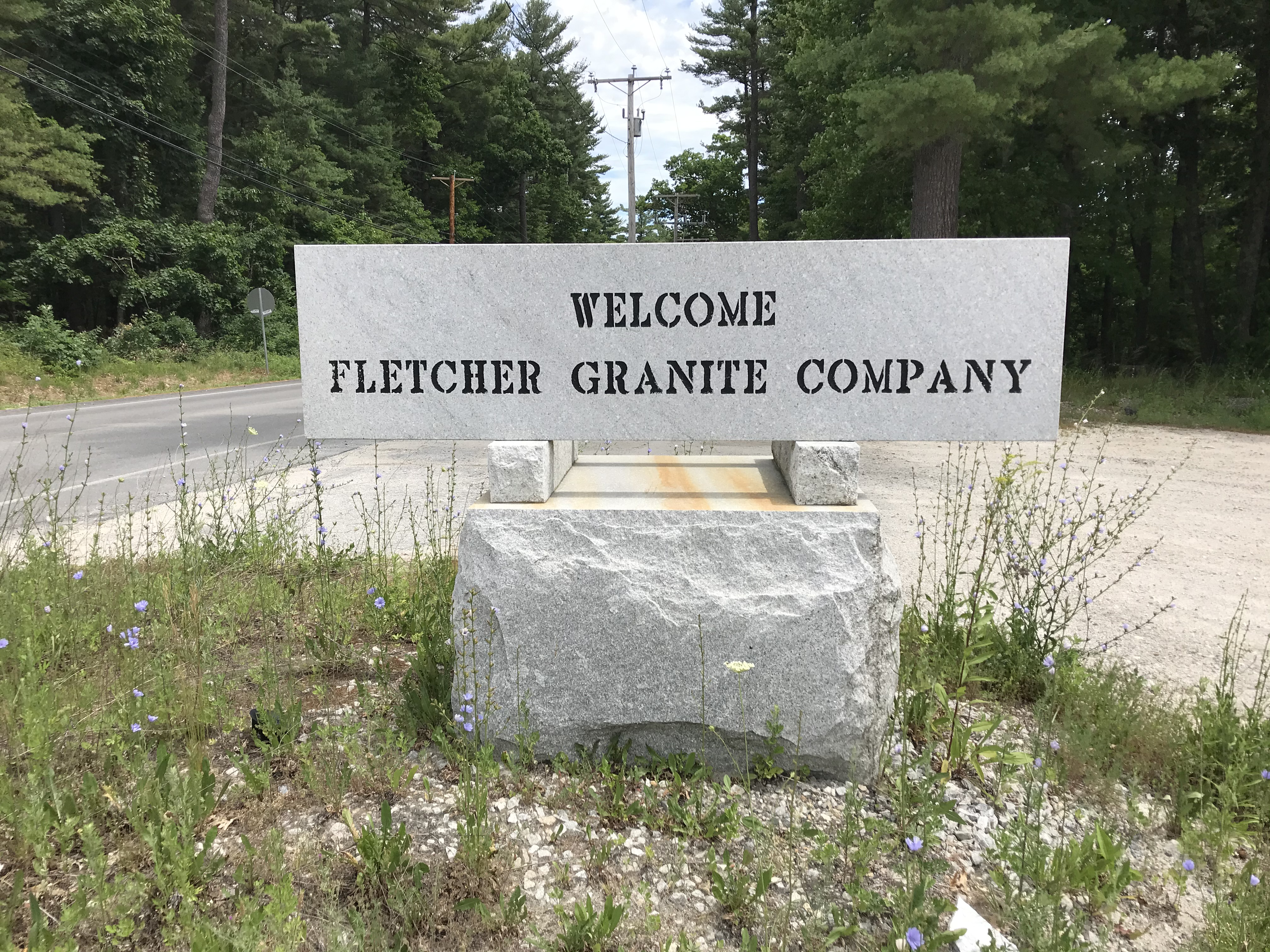
Fletcher Granite Company sign

Fletcher Granite Company is a granite curb fabricator and quarrying company that opened in 1881 in Westford, Massachusetts, and temporarily ceased operations in 2010. The company was once known for its famed Milford pink granite from Milford, Massachusetts, and also owned a granite quarry in Milford, New Hampshire, fifty miles to the north. They still operate the Chelmsford granite quarry adjacent to the mill, which has been in continuous use since 1881.

== History ==
Fletcher Granite Company is a granite quarrying and fabrication company based in Westford, Massachusetts. The company was founded in 1881 by Herbert Ellery Fletcher and operated under Fletcher family ownership for more than a century.

The company is associated with Chelmsford granite, a stone quarried in Westford since the nineteenth century and used in numerous construction projects throughout the northeastern United States. Fletcher supplied granite for a variety of public works, commercial buildings, bridges, and institutional projects, including portions of Quincy Market in Boston, the United States Naval Academy in Annapolis, Maryland, and the Supreme Court Building in Washington, D.C.

During its history, the company expanded from dimension stone production into the manufacture of granite curb products used in transportation and infrastructure projects. Following several ownership changes after 1985, Fletcher was acquired by the owners of Structural Stone LLC in 2024.

Today, the company operates a granite curb fabrication facility at its historic Westford site and continues to quarry Chelmsford granite. The facility also provides drafting and fabrication services related to curb production.
