= Flour and Grain Exchange Building =

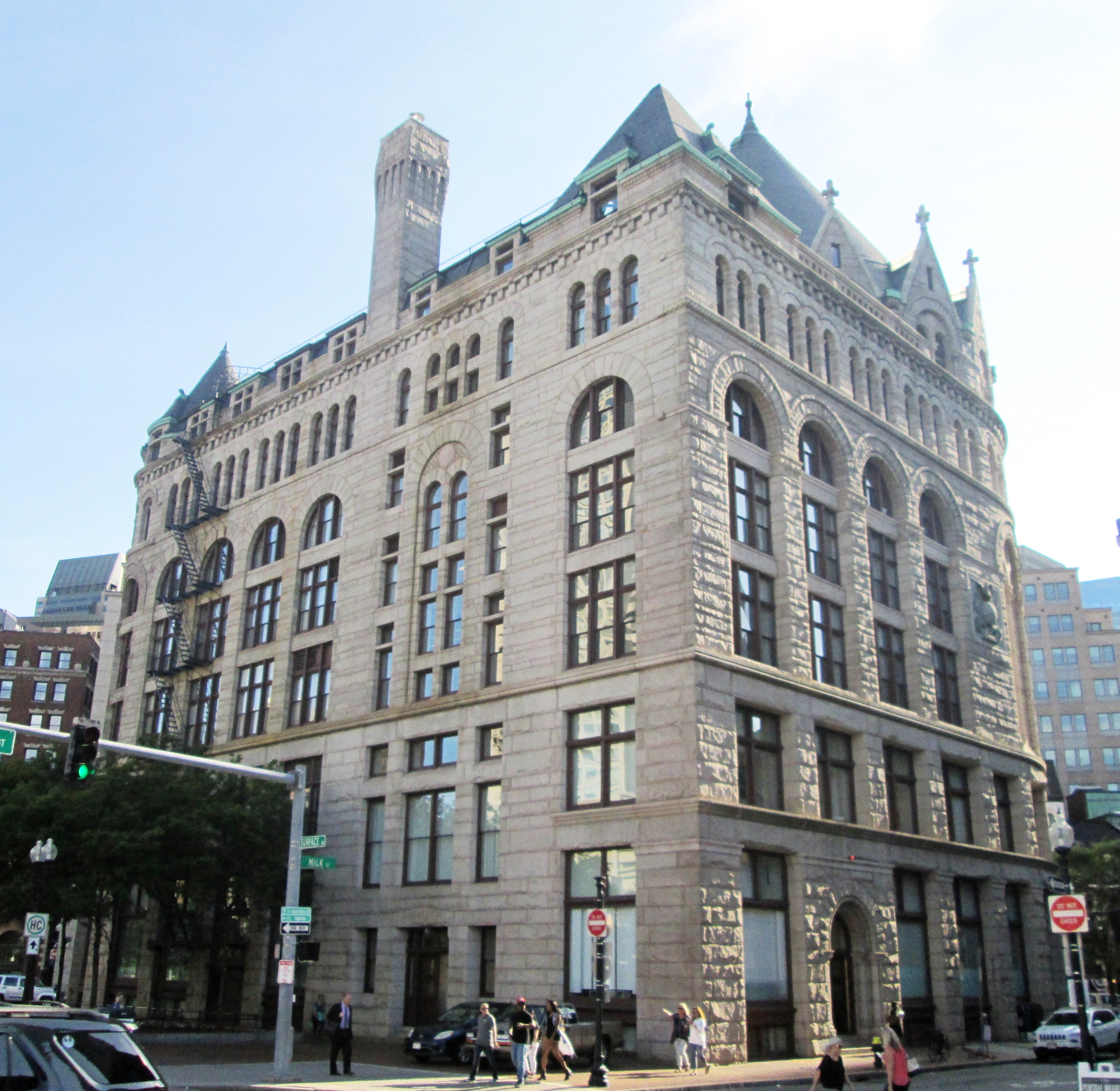
- The building from the northeast (2017)
- Interactive map of the Flour and Grain Exchange Building area

General information
- Architectural style: Romanesque Revival
- Location: Custom House District, 177 Milk Street, Boston, Massachusetts, United States
- Coordinates: 42.3585°N 71.0526°W
- Year built: 1891–1893
- Renovated: 1988

Technical details
- Material: Milford pink granite

Design and construction
- Architect: Shepley, Rutan and Coolidge
- Designations: Boston Landmark

Renovating team
- Renovating firm: The Beal Companies

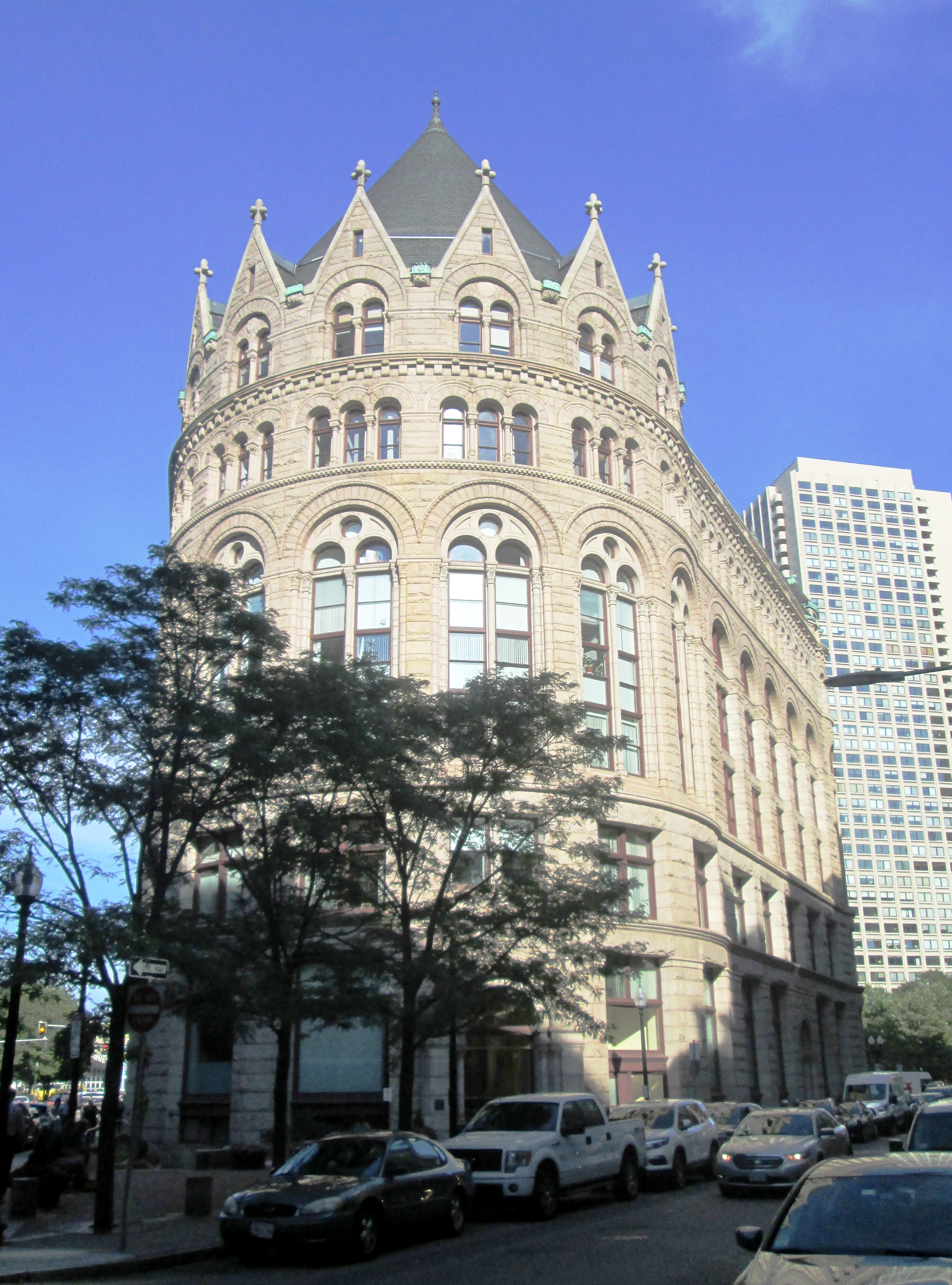
The western end of the building (2017)

The Flour and Grain Exchange Building is a 19th-century office building in Boston. Located at 177 Milk Street in the Custom House District, at the edge of the Financial District near the waterfront, it is distinguished by the large black slate conical roof at its western end. It is referred to as the Grain Exchange Building and sometimes as the Boston Chamber of Commerce Building.

== History and architecture ==
The Flour and Grain Exchange Building was built from 1891 to 1893 for its original occupant, the Boston Chamber of Commerce on land donated for that purpose by Henry Melville Whitney. It was designed by the firm of Shepley, Rutan and Coolidge (now Shepley Bulfinch), founded by the successors of Henry Hobson Richardson, and in the Romanesque Revival style often associated with Richardson. The building exterior is of Milford pink granite.

The Flour and Grain Exchange Building is seven stories tall, with two additional stories in a cylindrical turret at the west end. The ornate façade features three-story roundheaded windows at the middle floors. Triangular attic dormers topped by crocket finials at the turret give a crown-like aspect to the conical roof.

The Boston Chamber of Commerce was created by the merger of two bodies, the Boston Commercial Exchange and the Boston Produce Exchange, in 1885. Whitney, an industrialist and Chamber member, donated land for a building for the new body. Construction by the Norcross Brothers firm began in 1890 and the building was dedicated in January 1892. The Chamber occupied part of the building (the remainder was let to banks and other concerns) until 1902, when it was occupied by the Flour and Grain Exchange. A plaque in the building commemorates its hosting of the 5th International Congress of Chambers of Commerce and of Commercial and Industrial Associations in 1912, attended by American President William Howard Taft and delegates from fifty-five countries.

A restoration of the Flour and Grain Exchange Building façade was undertaken in 1988 by The Beal Companies. The building is a designated Boston landmark. Christopher Kimball's Milk Street moved into the building's ground floor in 2016. Other organizations which have occupied the building in the 21st century include Perry Dean Rogers Architects, Global Rescue, International Specialists, Inc. and the Beal Companies.

The building was designated a Boston Landmark by the Boston Landmarks Commission in 1994.

== Influence ==
The former Chamber of Commerce Building was the model for the Toronto Board of Trade Building, designed by the New York City firm of James & James and completed in 1892.
