= First Division Monument =

Military monument in Washington, D.C.

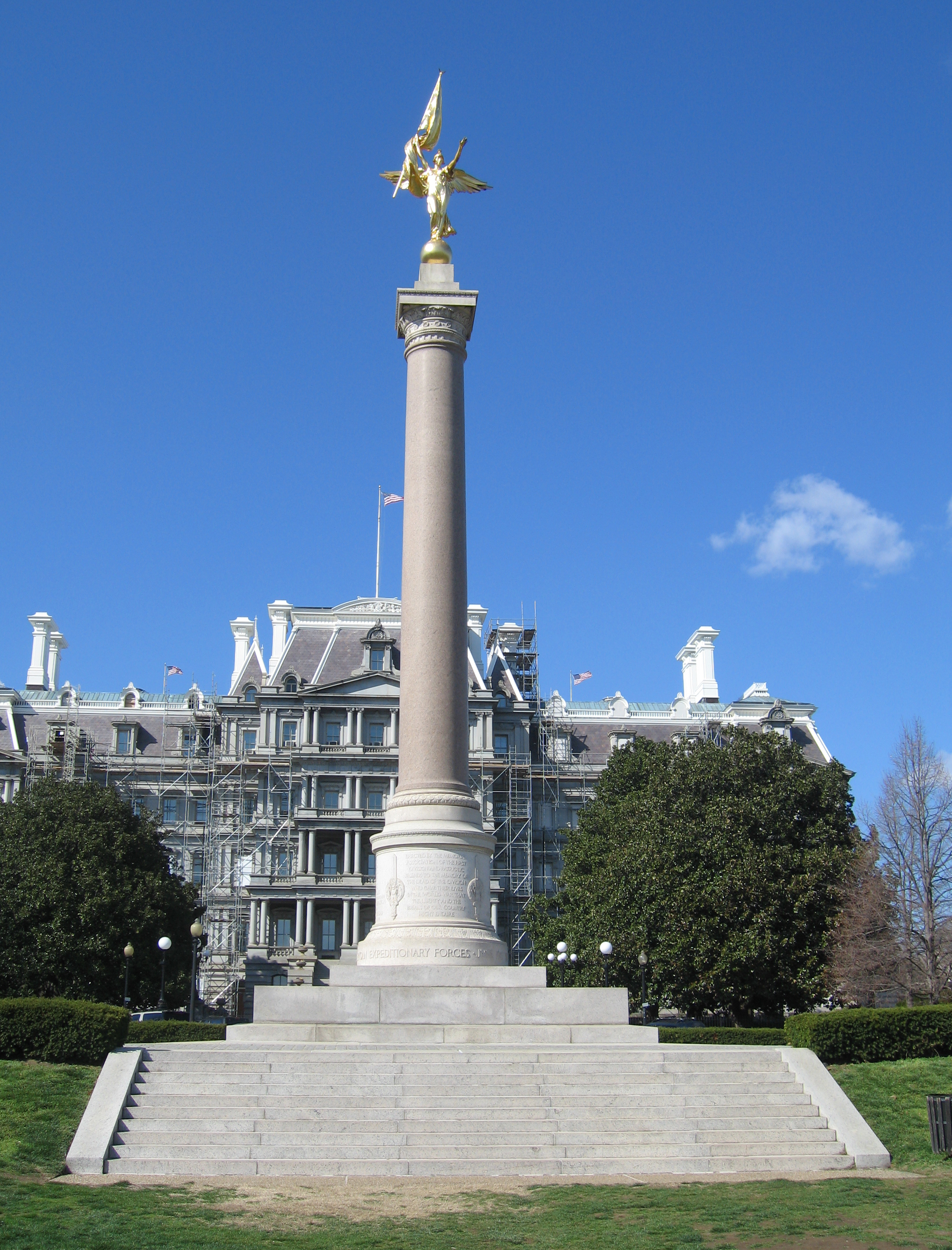
- Monument in 2008
- Interactive map of First Division Monument
- Location: President's Park; Washington, D.C. United States
- Coordinates: 38°53′46″N 77°02′19″W
- Designer: Cass Gilbert
- Type: Obelisk
- Material: Granite (George Dodds Granite Company, Xenia, Ohio)
- Completion date: 1924

The First Division Monument is located in President's Park, south of State Place Northwest, between 17th Street Northwest and West Executive Avenue Northwest in Washington, DC, United States. The Monument commemorates those who died while serving in the 1st Infantry Division of the U.S. Army of World War I and subsequent wars.

== History ==
The First Division Monument sits on a plaza in President's Park, west of the White House and south of the Eisenhower Executive Office Building (EEOB) at the corner of 17th Street and State Place, NW. (The EEOB was originally known as the State, War, and Navy Building and then as the Old Executive Office Building.)

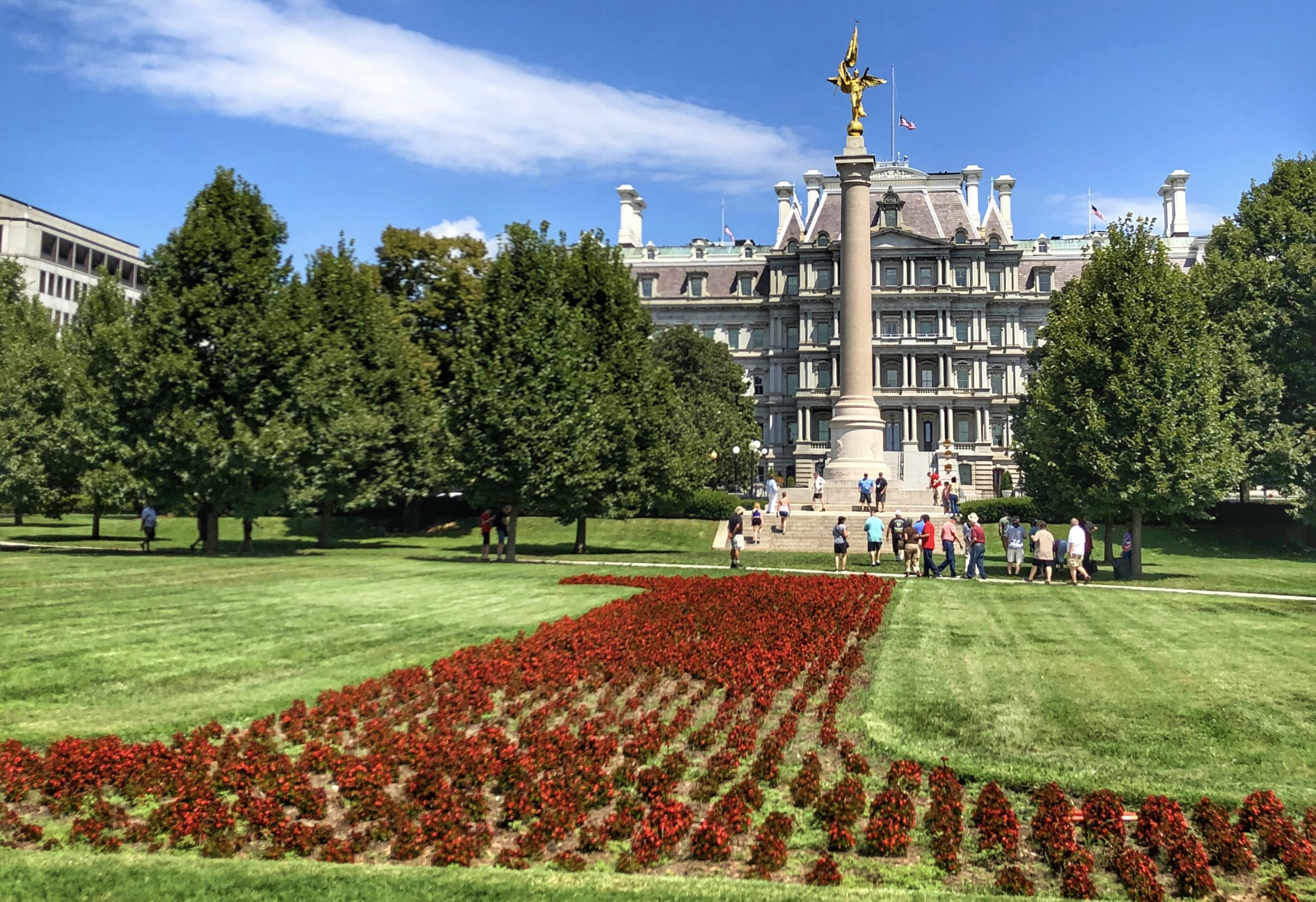
1st Infantry Division monument, Washington, D.C.

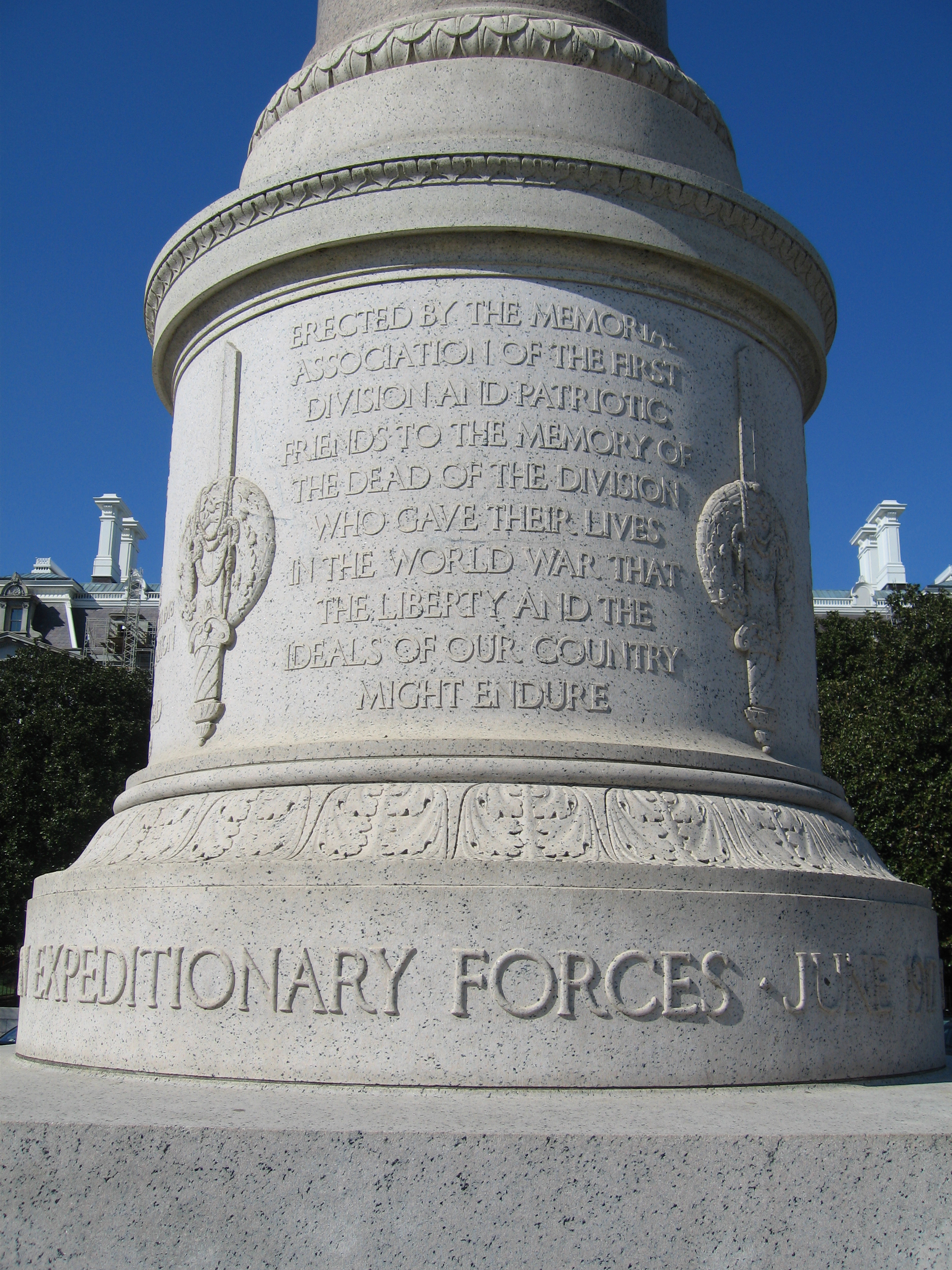
First Division Monument World War I dedication

The monument was conceived by the Society of the First Division, the veterans' organization of the U.S. Army's First Division (later renamed the 1st Infantry Division), to honor the valiant efforts of the soldiers who fought in World War I. It was dedicated October 4, 1924 and is inscribed with the names of 5,516 fallen servicemen.

The monument was built using Milford pink granite.

Later additions to the monument commemorate the lives of 1st Infantry Division soldiers who died in subsequent wars. The World War II addition on the west side was dedicated in 1957 (4,325 names), the Vietnam War addition on the east side in 1977 (3,079 names), and the Desert Storm plaque in 1995 (27 names).

The #1 red annuals flowerbed (bed length 181 ft) in front of the monument was added as part of First Lady Lady Bird Johnson’s beautification plans in 1965.

Congressional approval was obtained to erect the First Division Monument and its later additions on federal ground.

== Adding names of the fallen from recent conflicts ==
Department of the Army Policy requires an official campaign to end before names of soldiers killed in that campaign may be added to the monument. The Commanding General, 1st Infantry Division has approved the criteria for determining names and units the Society may add to the First Division Monument. There are 631 names, along with their units to be added, with each name listed under the unit they served at the time.

● Operation Iraqi Freedom and Operation New Dawn (Iraq): 439

● Operation Enduring Freedom (Afghanistan): 192

In 2019, Congress passed the First Act to authorize the Society of the First Infantry Division to make modifications to the First Division Monument located on Federal Land in President’s Park in the District of Columbia.

== Funding ==
The Society of the First Division (later called the Society of the 1st Infantry Division) raised all the funds for the original monument and its additions. No federal money was used.

The Society is raising funds to add the 631 names to the monument, with a goal to add them before Memorial Day 2024.

== Architects ==
Cass Gilbert was the architect of the original memorial and Daniel Chester French was the sculptor of the Victory statue. Gilbert's son, Cass Gilbert Jr., designed the World War II addition. Both the Vietnam War addition and the Desert Storm plaque were designed by the Philadelphia firm of Harbeson, Hough, Livingston, and Larson. The Iraq and Afghanistan additions are designed by HOK Group, Inc., headquartered in St. Louis, Mo.

== Maintenance ==
Today, the monument and grounds are maintained by the National Park Service.

== See also ==
- Public sculptures by Daniel Chester French
- List of public art in Washington, D.C., Ward 2
