= Milford pink granite =

Granite quarried in Milford, Massachusetts

- Igneous rock
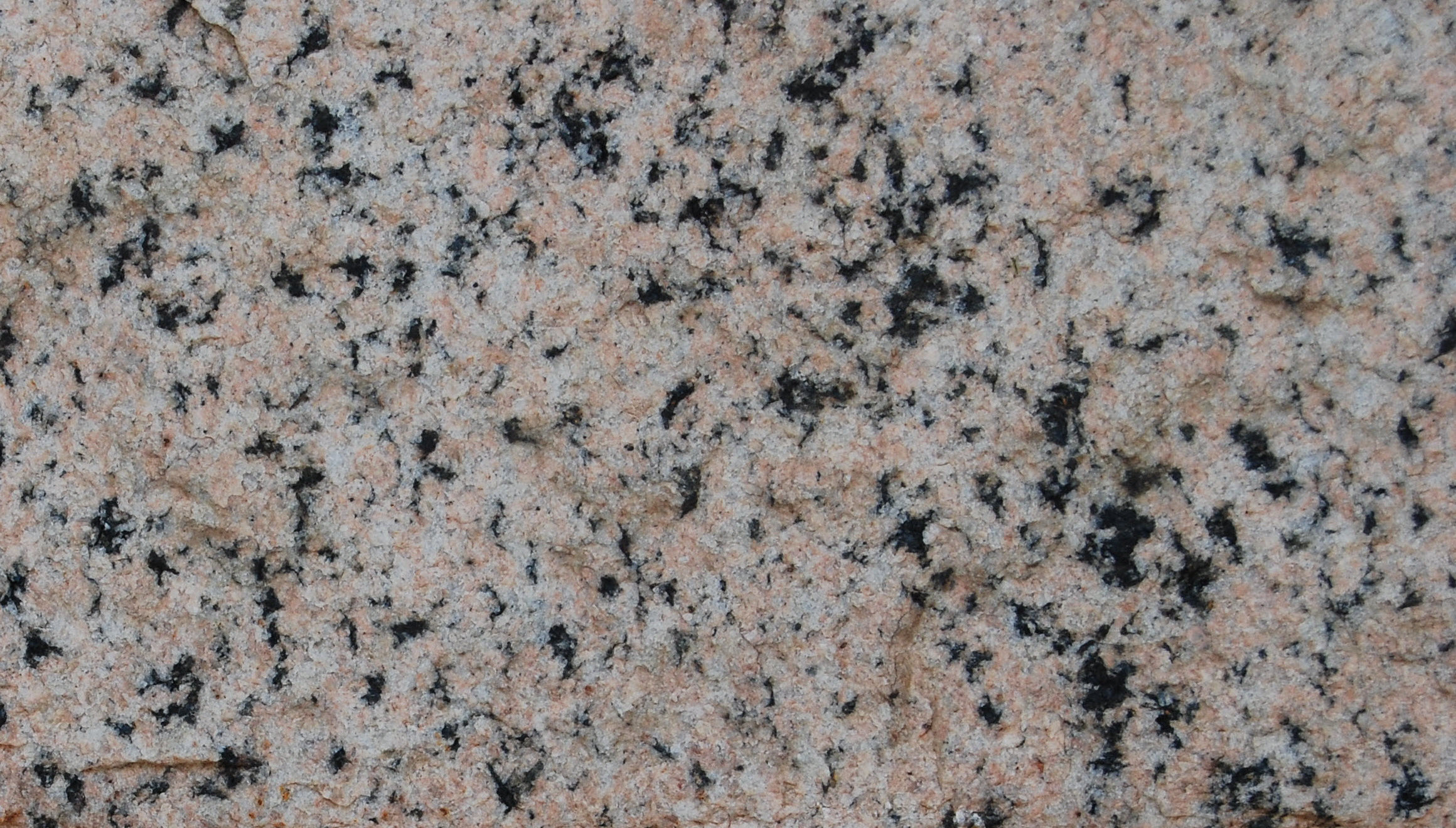

Composition
- Silicon dioxide, Aluminium oxide, Iron(III) oxide, Manganese(II) oxide, Calcium oxide, Magnesium oxide, Potassium oxide, Sodium oxide, Biotite

Milford pink granite, also known as Milford granite or Milford pink, is a granite deposit located in and around the town of Milford, Massachusetts. Covering an area of approximately 39 square miles (100 km^{2}) according to the USGS, The Proterozoic igneous rock is also known as Braggville granite, a name derived from the quarries once active in Braggville, a historic village whose territory is now split between Holliston and Milford .

From 1870 to 1940, the town of Milford became famous for the "pink" variety of this stone, prized as a building material. According to local legend, the granite was "discovered" in the early 1870s by two brothers, James and William Sherman at Rocky Woods in Milford. At its peak, over 1,000 men labored in dozens of quarries in Milford and nearby Hopkinton. A sample of Milford Pink is on display at the Smithsonian Institution.

Milford pink granite was quarried by the Fletcher Granite Company, at their Lumber Street quarry in Hopkinton, which also owned a granite quarry in Milford, New Hampshire, 50 miles to the north.

== Description ==
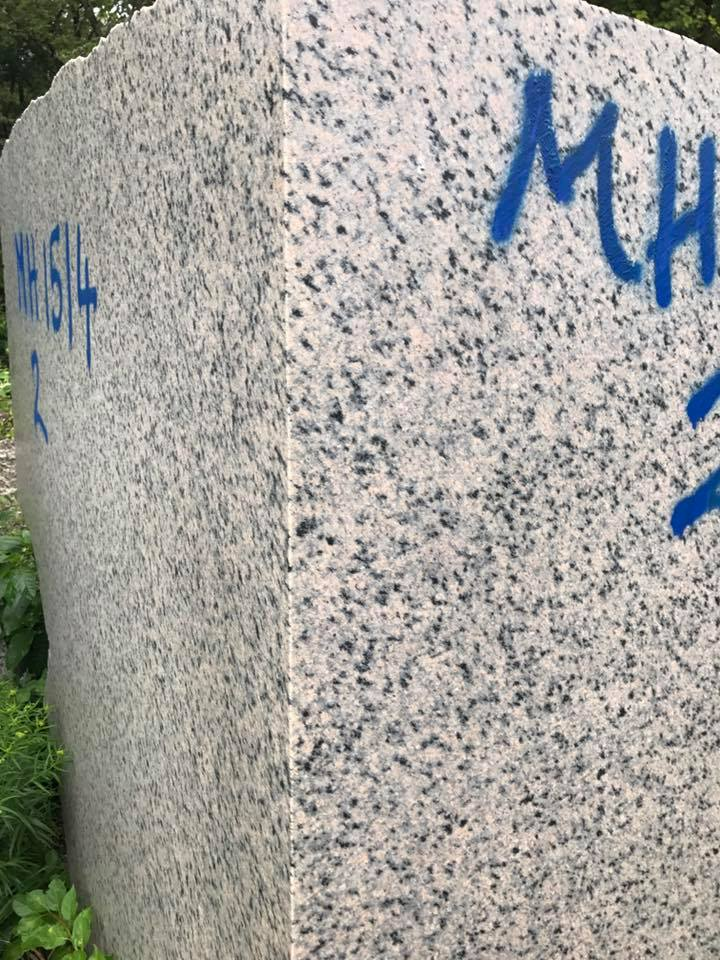
A block of granite from the Fletcher Granite Company photographed in 2017

The granite is described as a light gray or light pinkish-gray to a medium, slightly pinkish or pinkish and greenish-gray biotite granite with spots from 0.2 to 0.5 inches (5.1 to 12.7 mm) across and in some cases tapering out to 1 inch (25 mm) in length. The biotite is typically in clots or short streaks. It is commonly locally gneissic. The color of the stone is governed mainly by its feldspars, pink from the potash and green from the soda lime feldspar.

== Examples of use ==
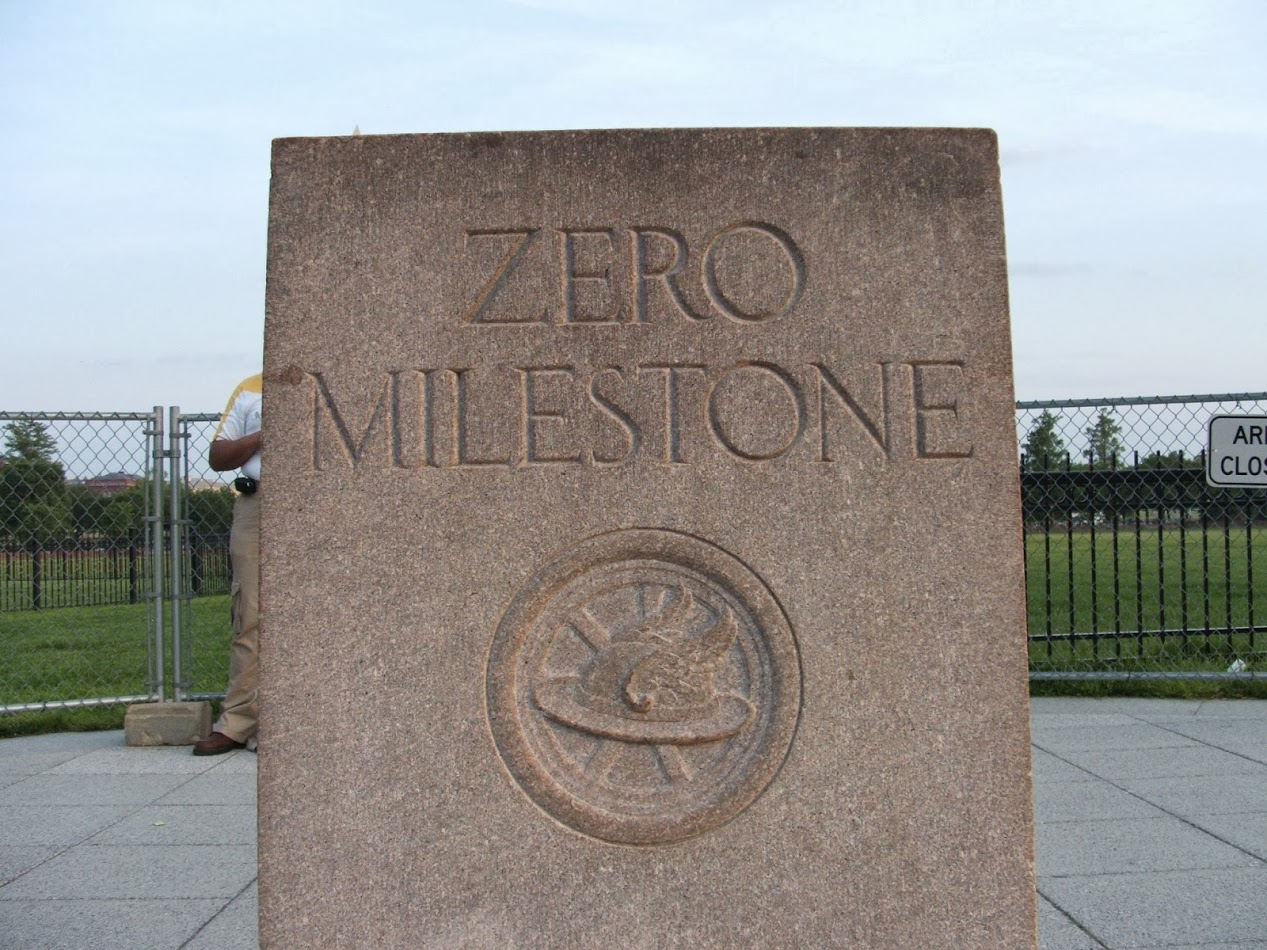
Milford pink granite was used for the Zero Milestone in Washington, D.C.

(1923)

Massachusetts

- Bancroft Memorial Library, Hopedale (1898)
- Boston Public Library, McKim Building, Boston (1895)
- Flour and Grain Exchange Building, Boston (1892)
- Memorial Hall, Milford (1884)
- Town Hall, Hopedale (1886)
- Worcester City Hall, Worcester (1898)

New York City

- American Museum of Natural History (1869)
- Brooklyn Museum, Brooklyn (1895)
- General Post Office Building (1912)
- Pennsylvania Station (1910)
- University Club of New York (1899)

Washington, D.C.

• Smithsonian Freer Gallery of Art (1923)

- Eccles Federal Reserve Building (1937)
- First Division Monument (1924)
- Zero Milestone (1923)

Other

- Allegheny County Courthouse, Pittsburgh, Pennsylvania (1888)
- Cullum Hall of The United States Military Academy at West Point, New York (1898)
- John J. Glessner House, Chicago, Illinois (1887)
- Pennsylvania Station, Baltimore, Maryland (1911)
- Singapore Changi Airport, Changi, Singapore (2002)

== Gallery ==
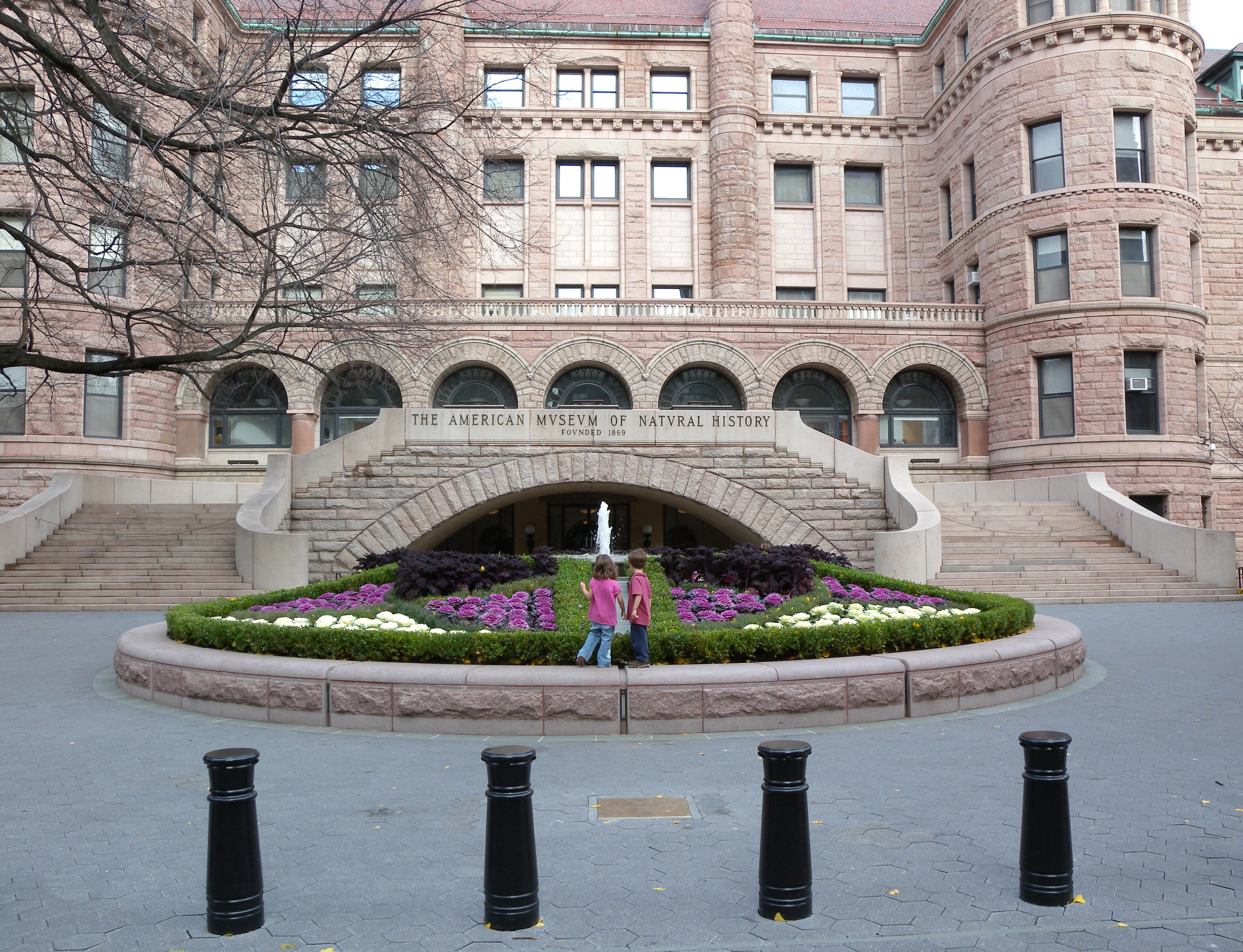
American Museum of Natural History, New York City (1869)

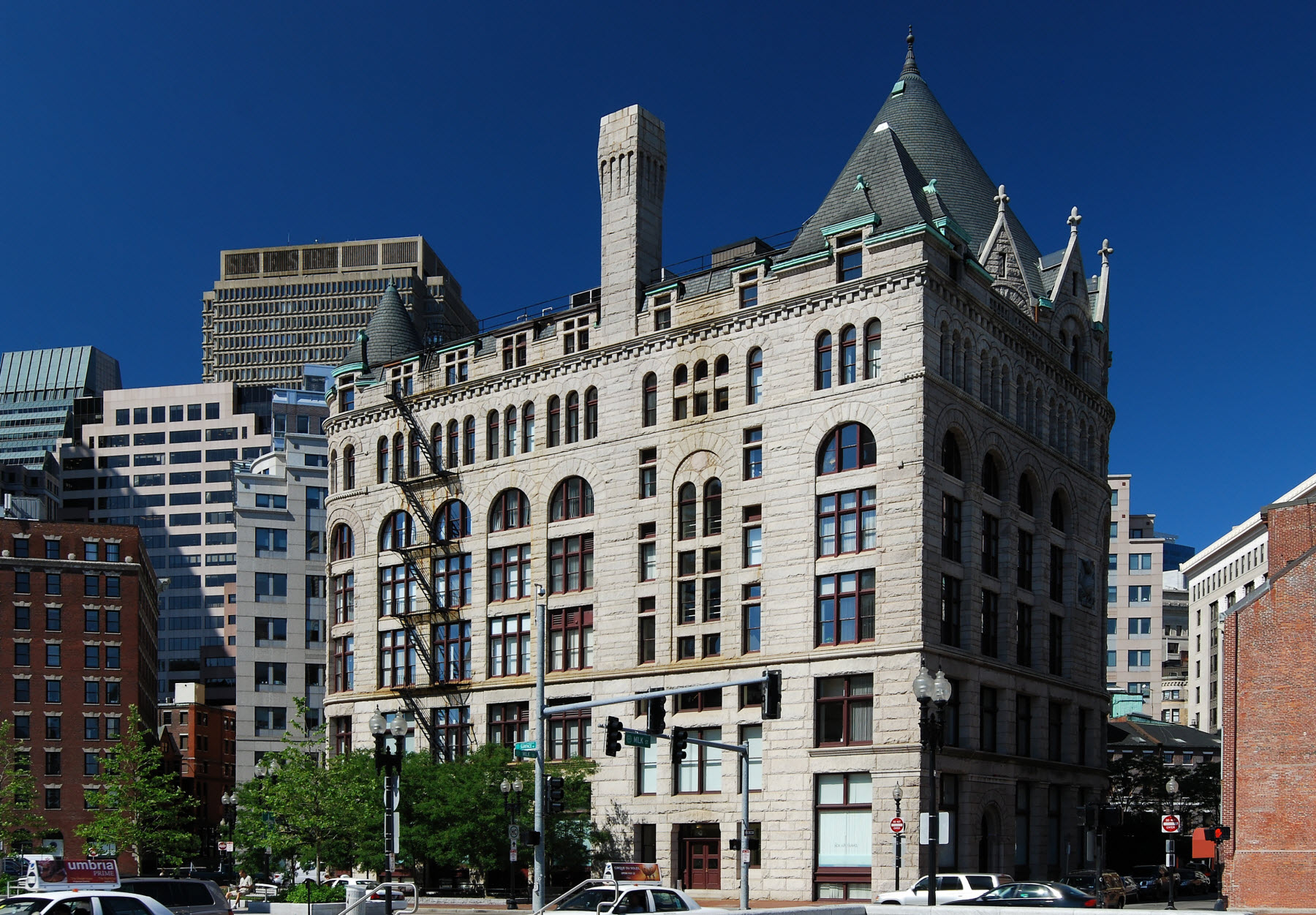
Flour and Grain Exchange Building, Boston (1892)

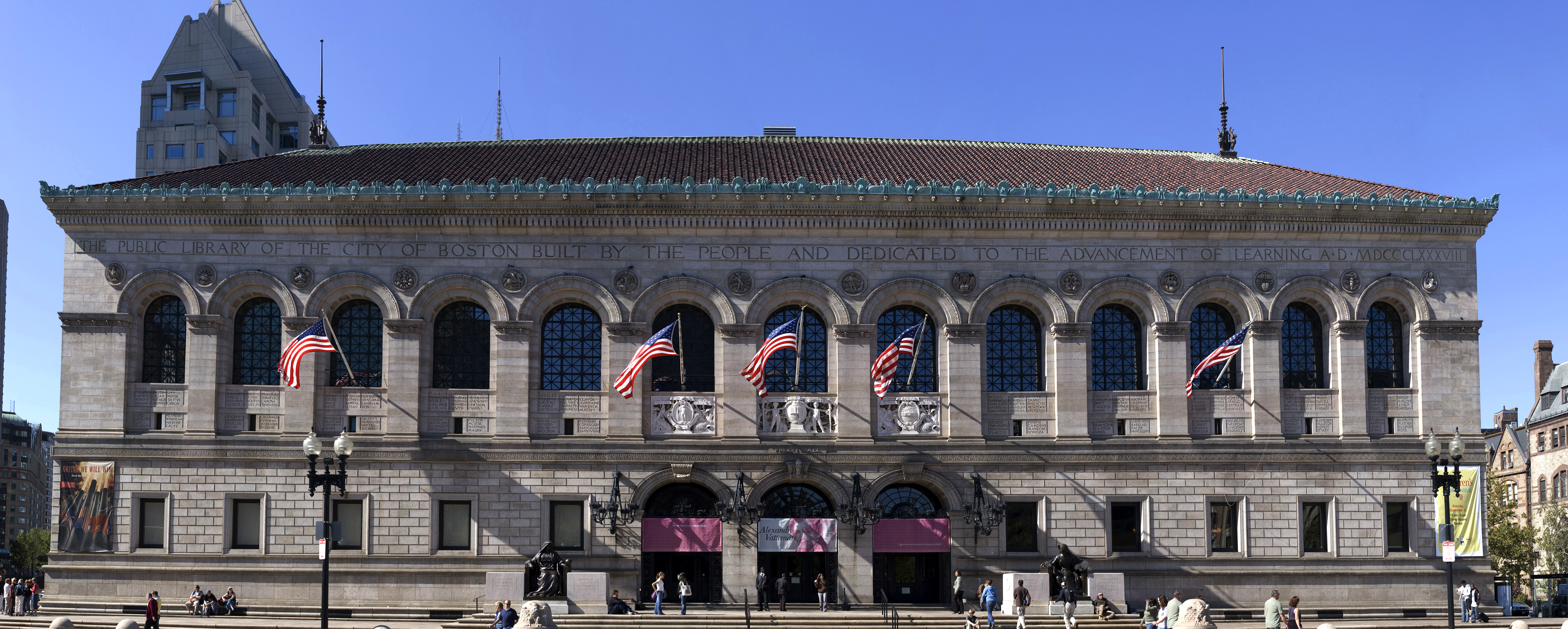
Boston Public Library (1889)

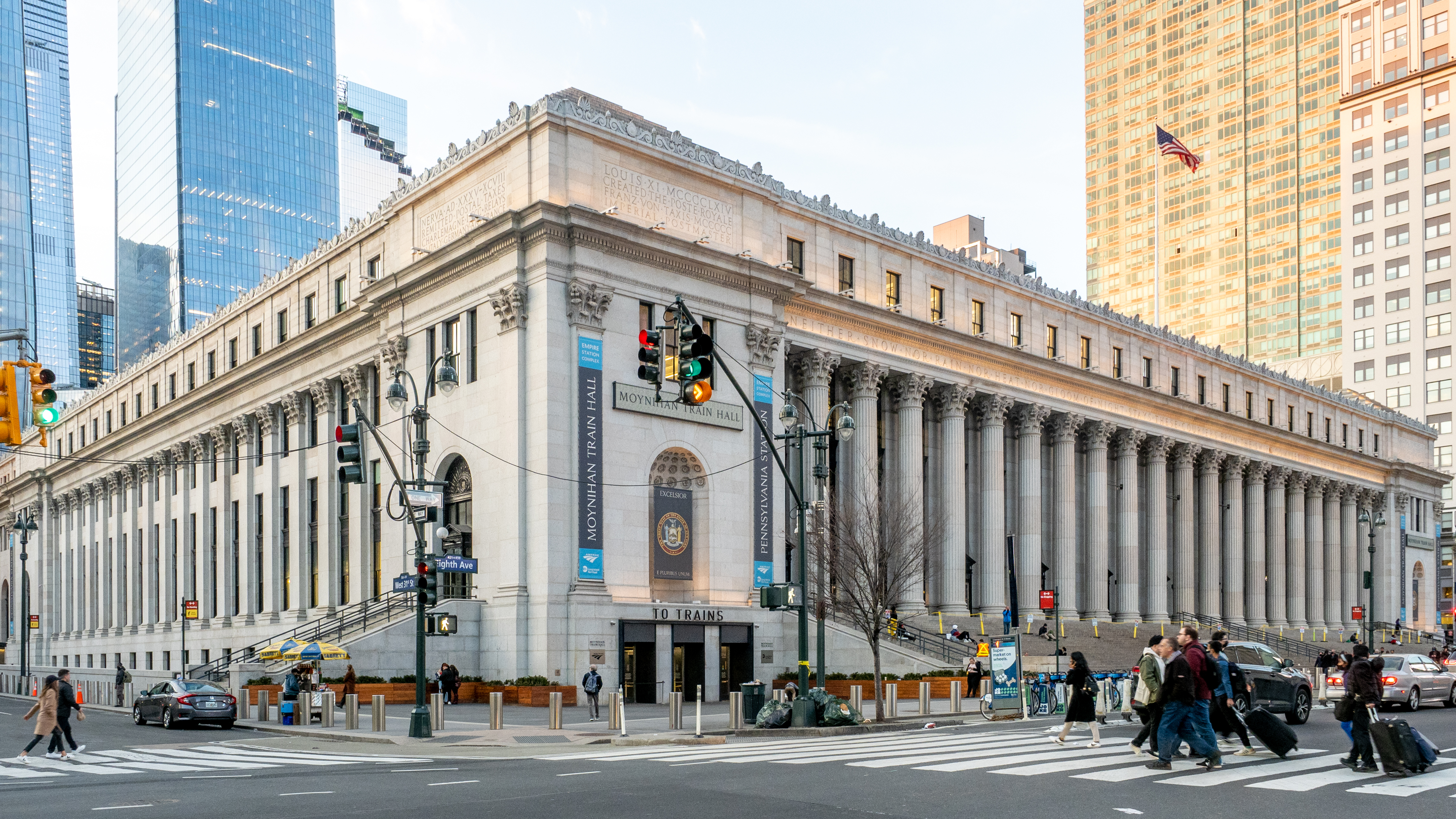
General Post Office, New York City (1914)

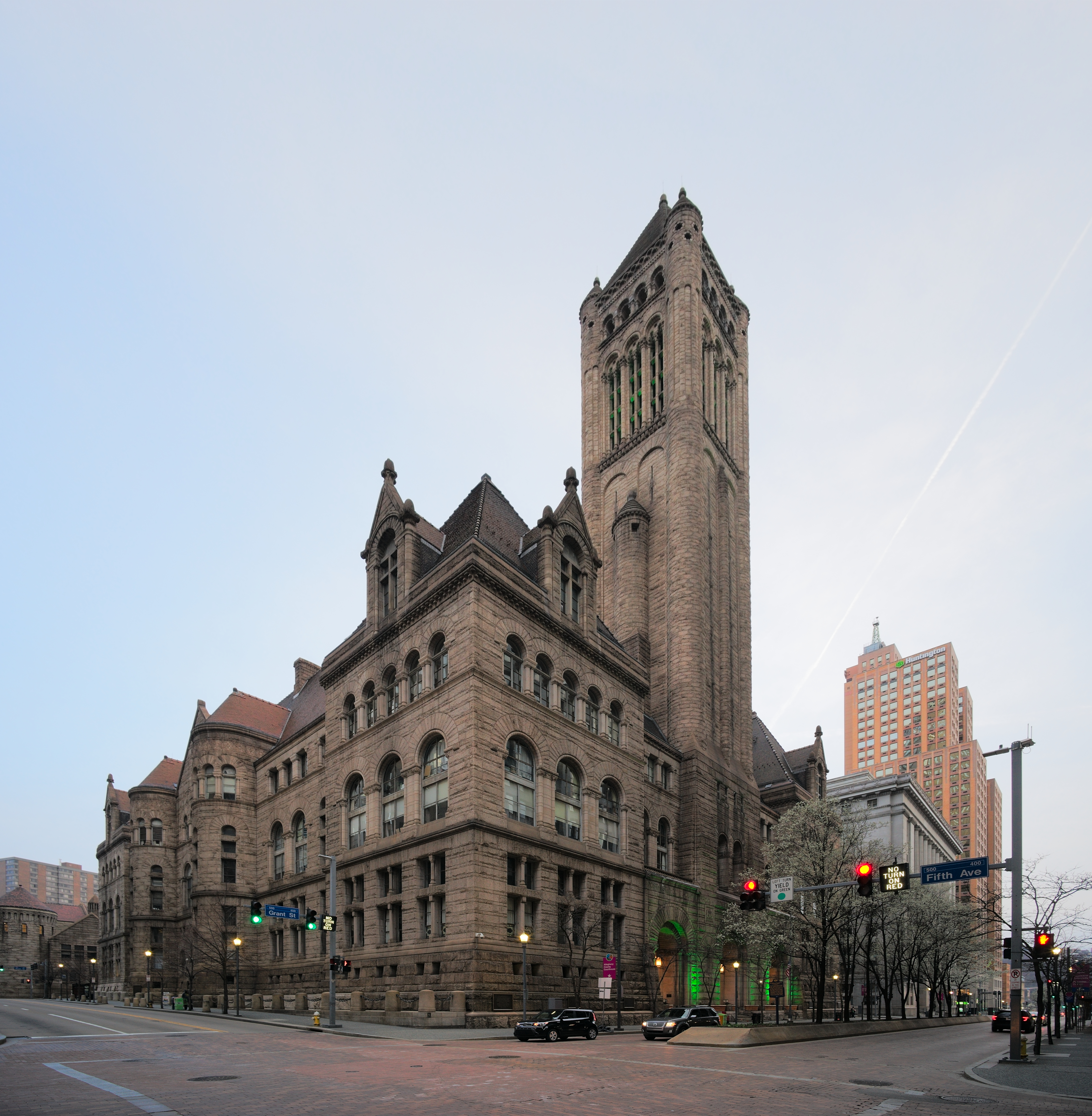
Allegheny County Courthouse, Pittsburgh, Pennsylvania (1888)

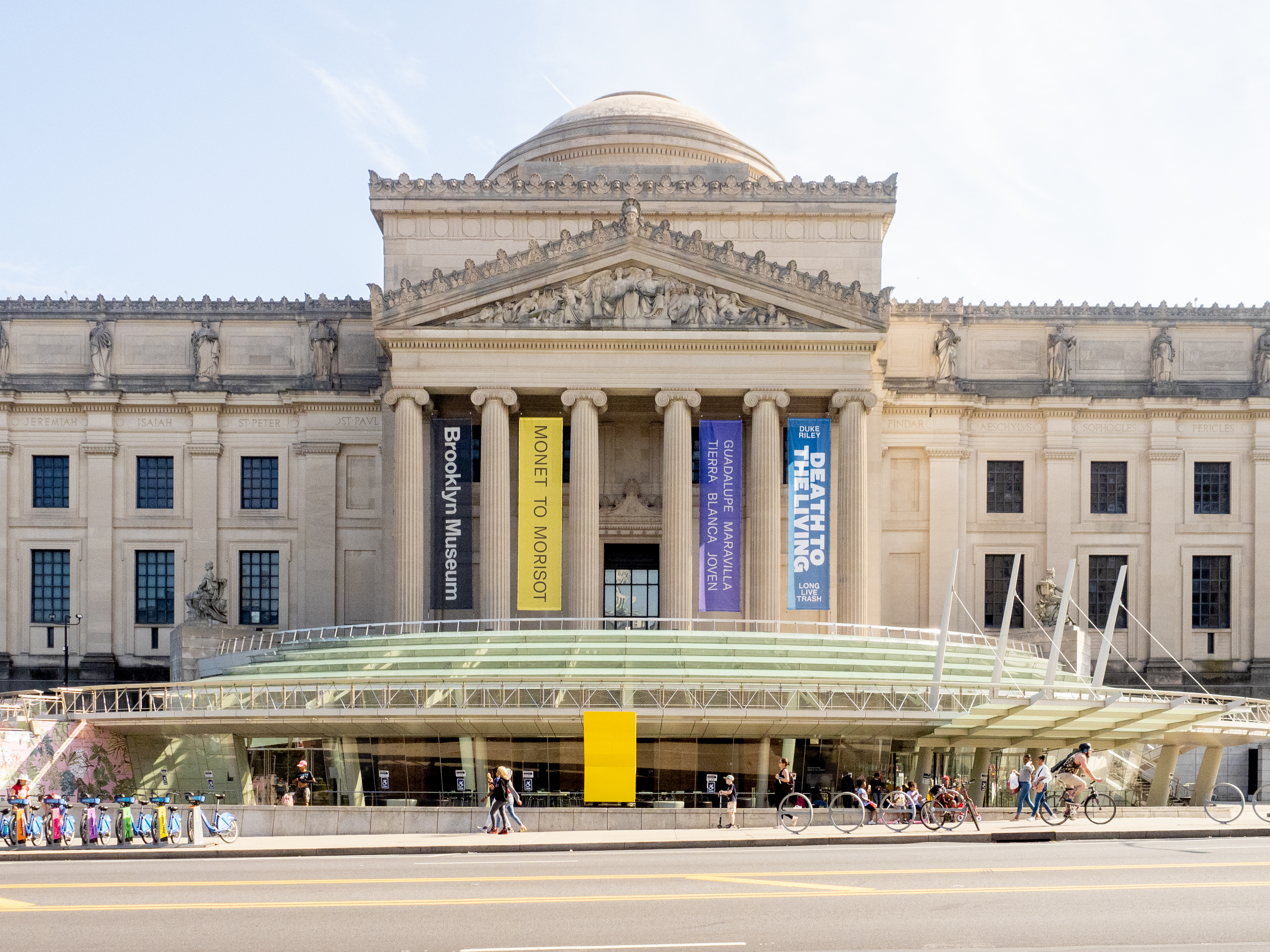
Brooklyn Museum (1895)

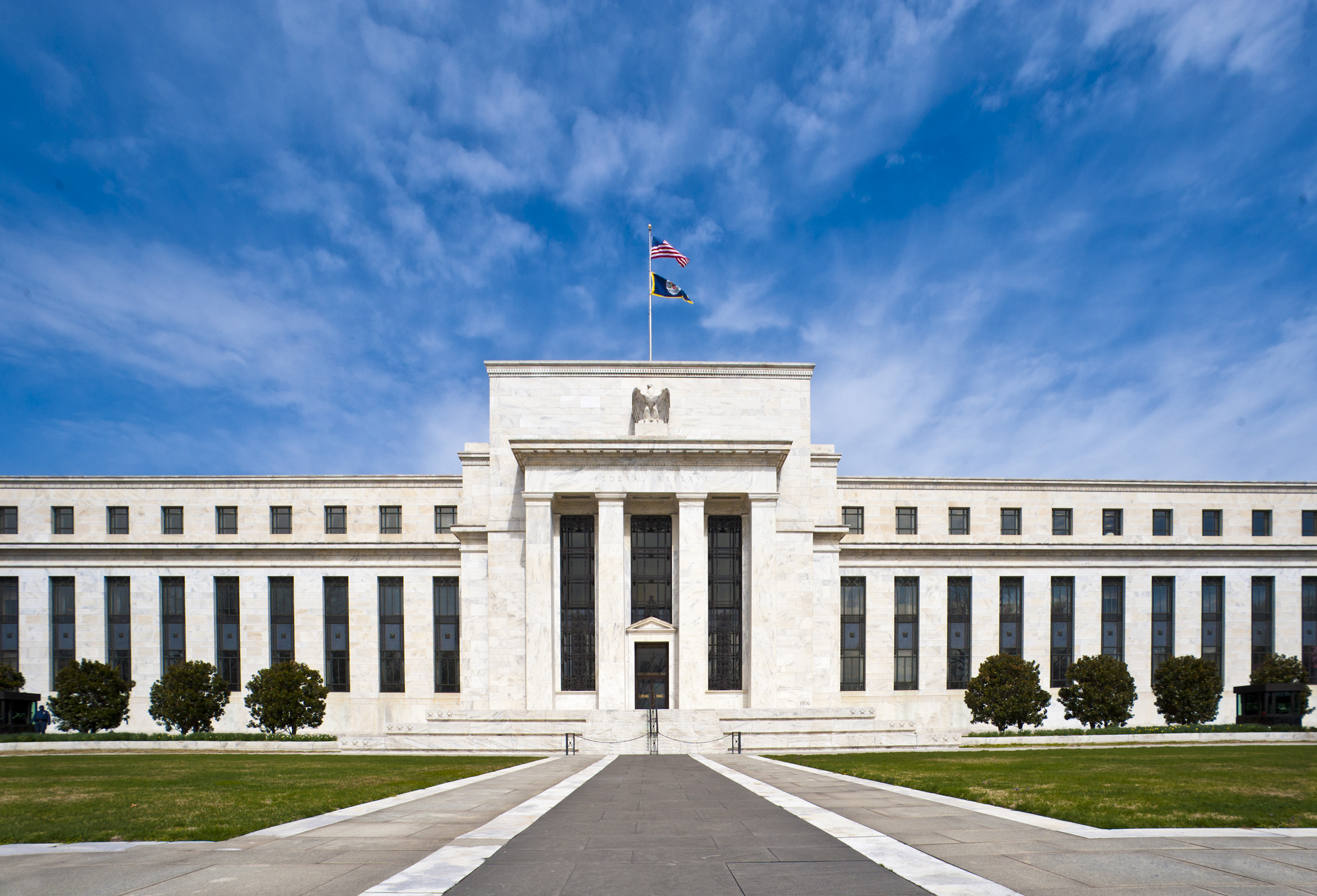
Federal Reserve Board Building, Washington, D.C. (1937)

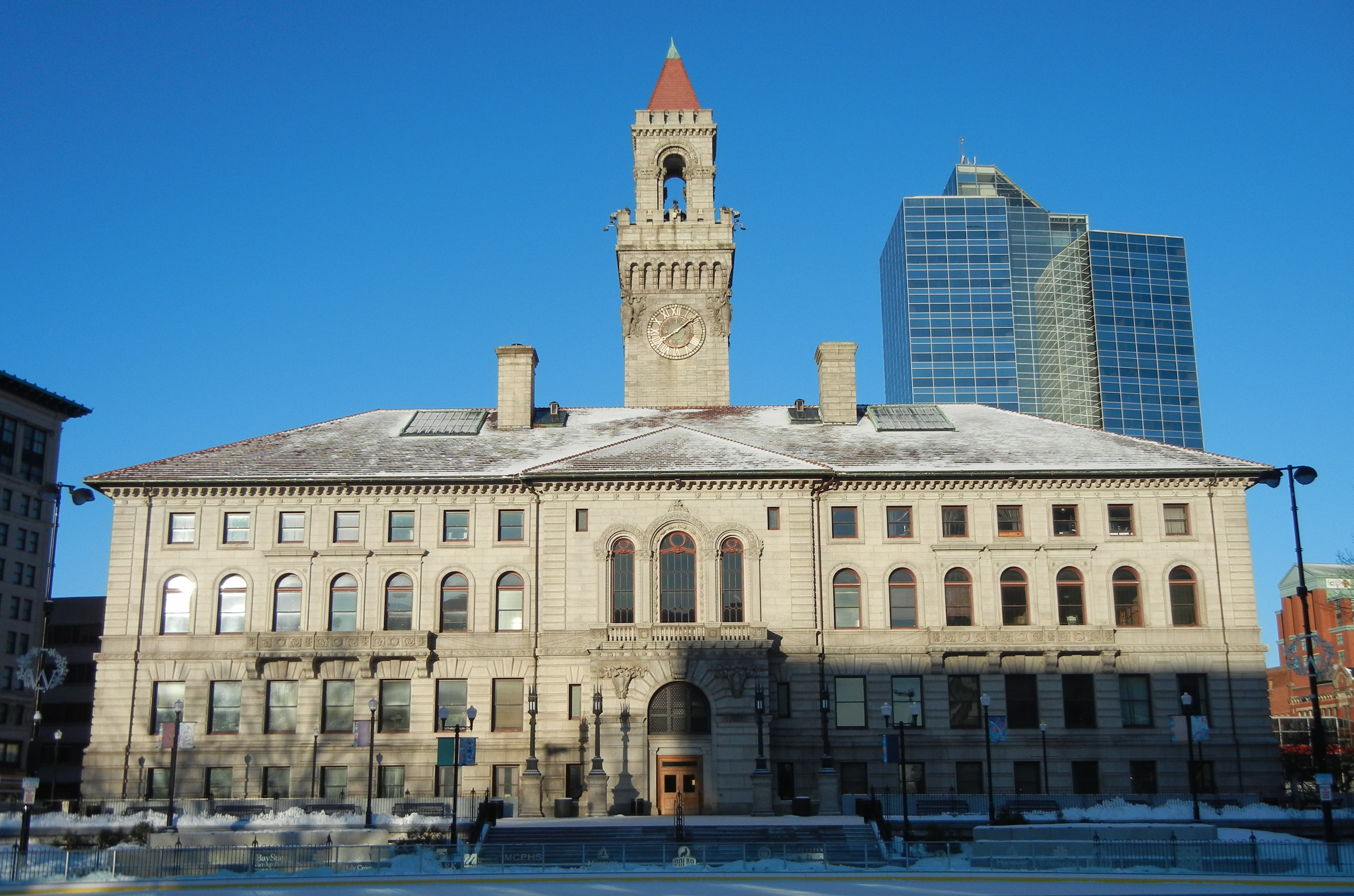
Worcester City Hall, Worcester, Massachusetts (1898)

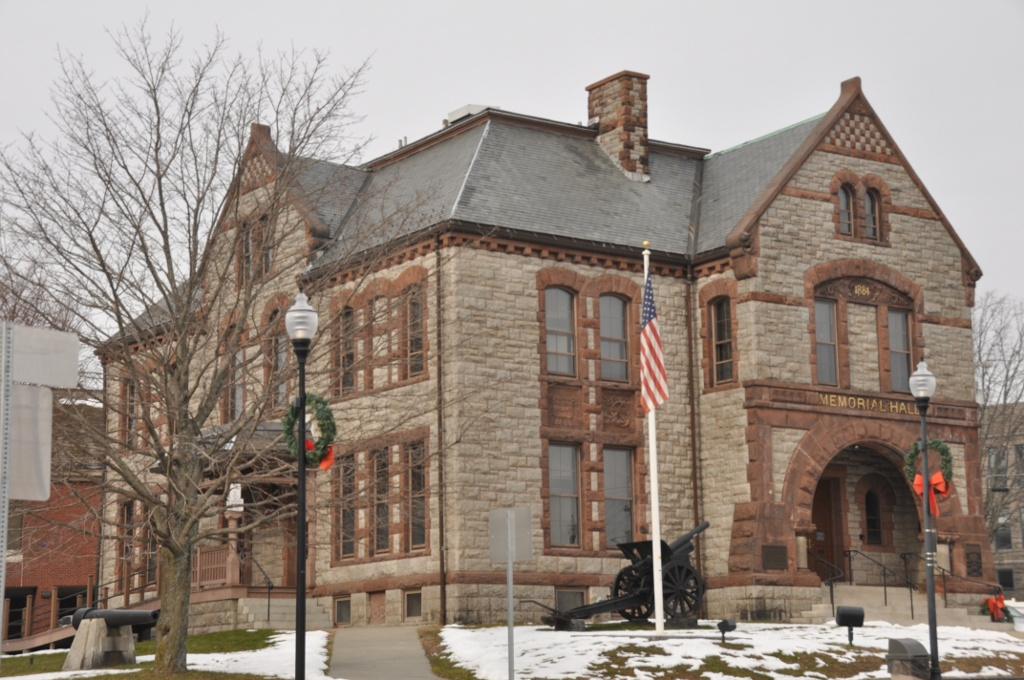
Memorial Hall, Milford, Massachusetts (1884)

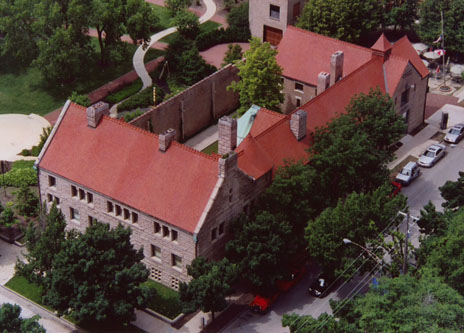
John J. Glessner House, Chicago, Illinois (1887)

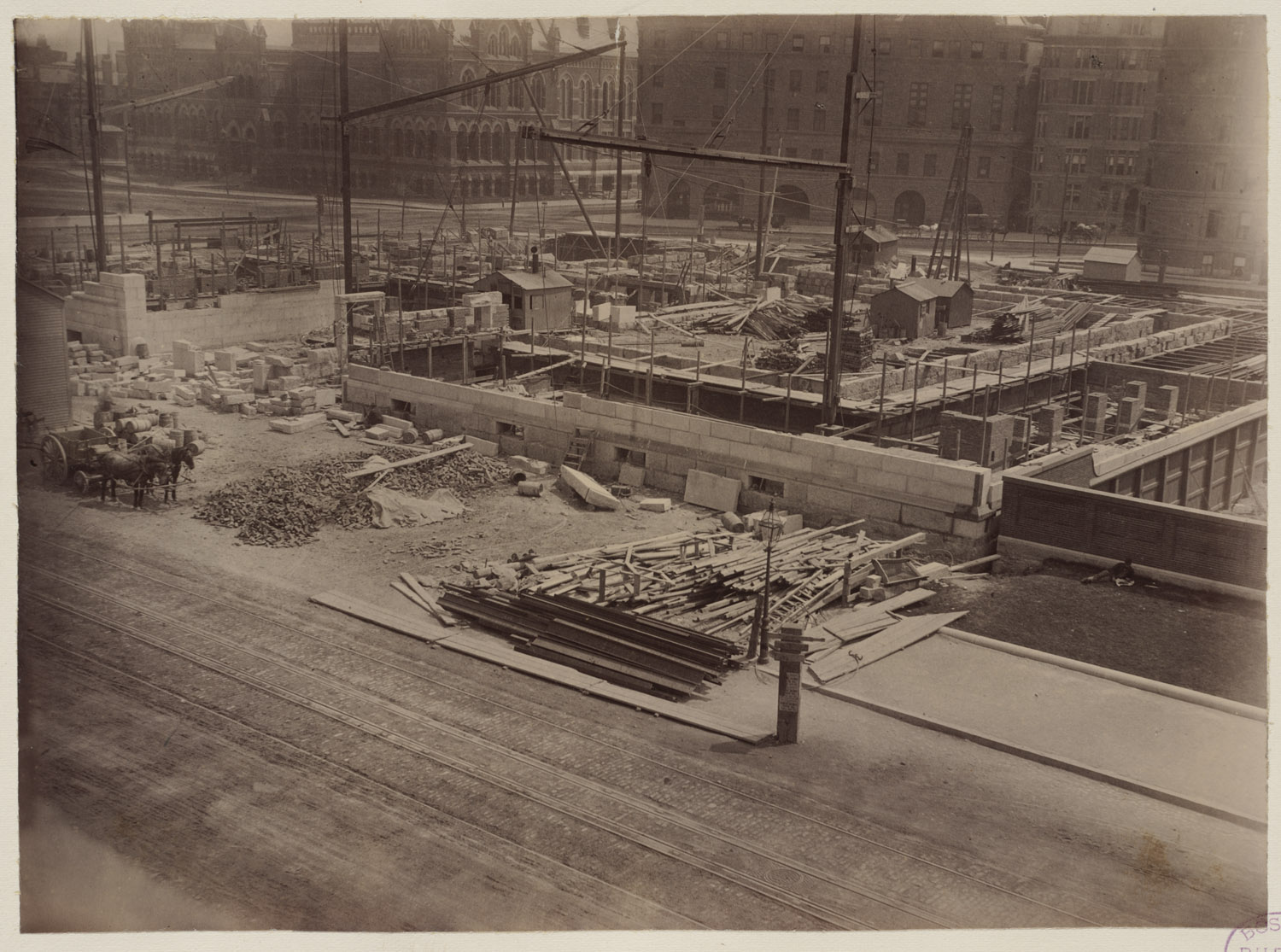
Boston Public Library under construction, 1889

== See also ==
- Fall River granite
- Norcross Brothers
