= Toronto Board of Trade Building =

Building in Toronto, Ontario

Coordinates: 43.647270°N 79.376770°W

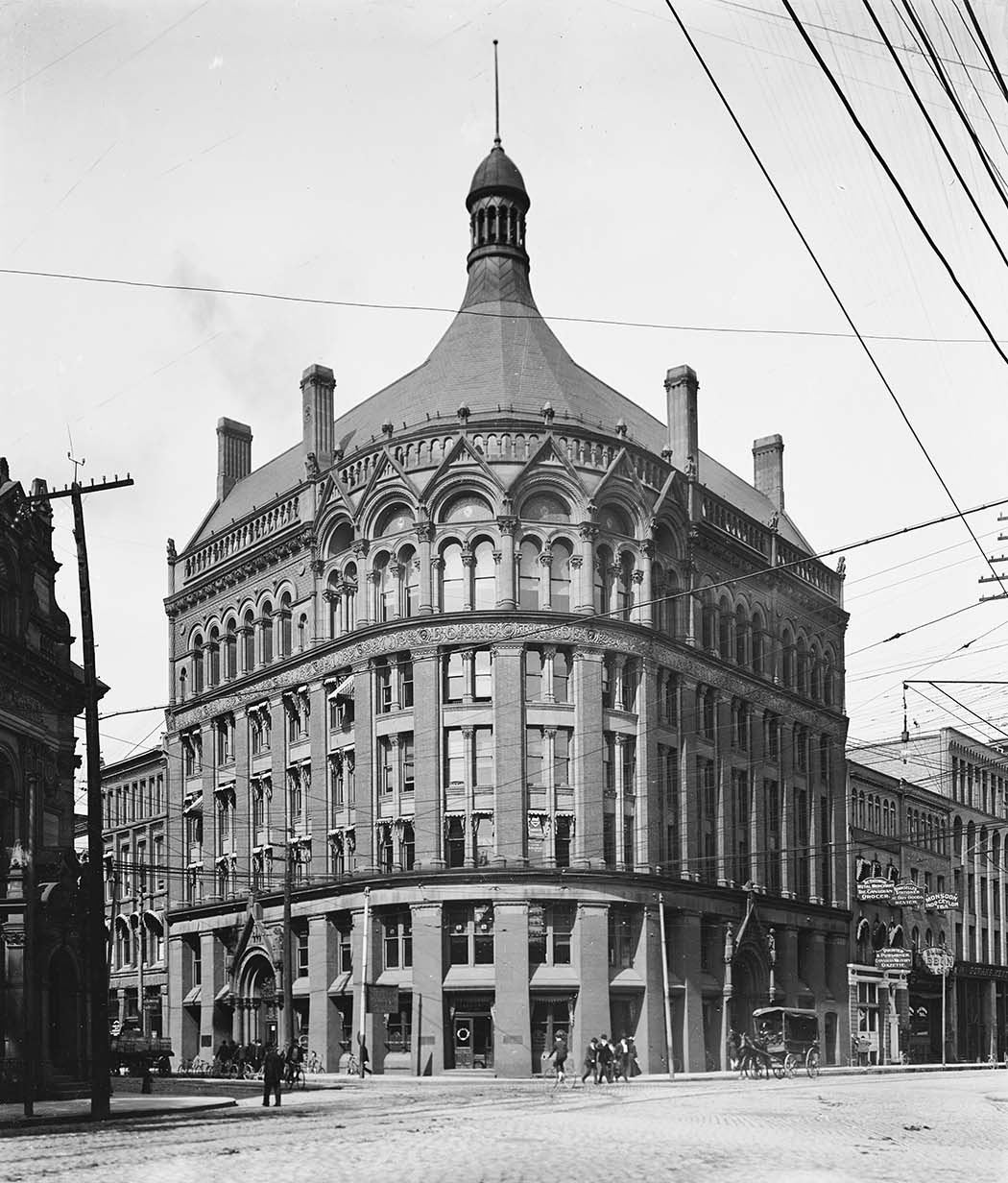
Toronto Board of Trade Building

The Board of Trade Building was one of the first skyscrapers in Toronto, Ontario, Canada. Completed in 1892 on the corner of Front Street East and Yonge Street, the seven storey tower was home to the Toronto Board of Trade and the Toronto Transit Commission.

The building was designed by the American architectural firm of James & James of New York City, and somewhat resembled the appearance of the Flour and Grain Exchange Building in Boston, Massachusetts, which had been designed two years earlier by the Boston firm of Shepley, Rutan & Coolidge. That Boston firm was also credited with the plans for the Montreal Board of Trade Building. There was considerable controversy about the award of the design contract; the Board of Trade wanted to build a skyscraper like those in New York, Chicago and Boston, and they favoured an American architect over Canadian-based ones, supposedly on the basis of experience with tall buildings. The first design by James & James of New York partially collapsed during construction. James & James were dismissed from the job and Edward A. Kent, an architect from Buffalo, N.Y., was called in to complete the building following the plans of James & James.

The Board of Trade Building was soon eclipsed in height in 1894 by the Beard Building and then in 1895 by the ten-story Temple Building on Bay Street.

It was demolished in 1958. The lot is now occupied by the EDS office tower.
