= Worcester Consolidated Street Railway =

Former streetcar network in Massachusetts, US

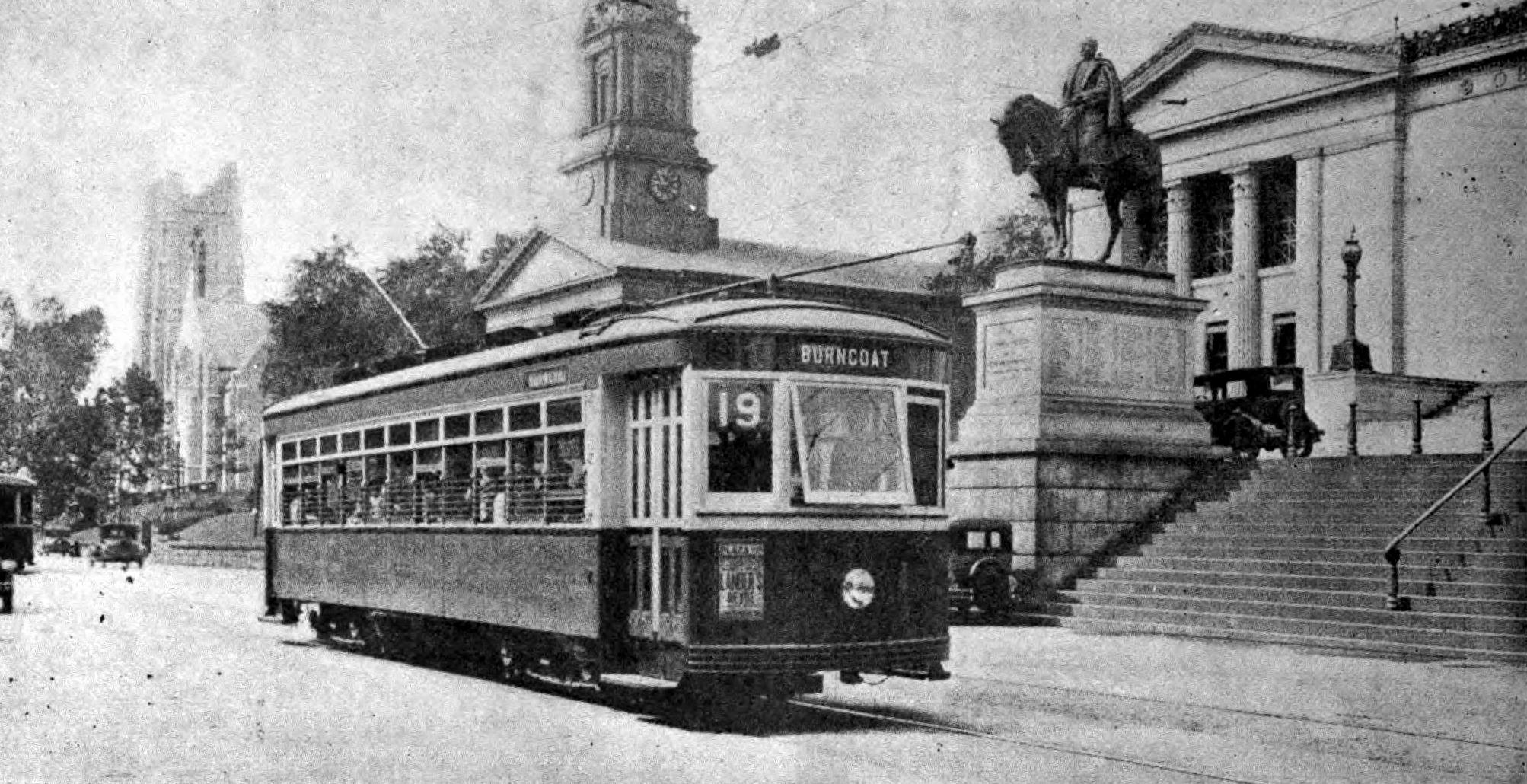
- A streetcar on route 19 passing the Worcester County Courthouse around 1928

Overview
- Fleet: 547 streetcars (1918); 237 buses (1948)
- Parent company: New York, New Haven and Hartford Railroad (1906–1932)
- Headquarters: Worcester, Massachusetts, US
- Locale: Worcester County, Massachusetts, US
- Dates of operation: 1863–1978
- Successor: Worcester Regional Transit Authority

Technical
- Track gauge: 1,435 mm (4 ft 8 1/2 in)
- Electrification: 600 V (DC)
- Track length: 252 miles (406 km) in 1918
Route map
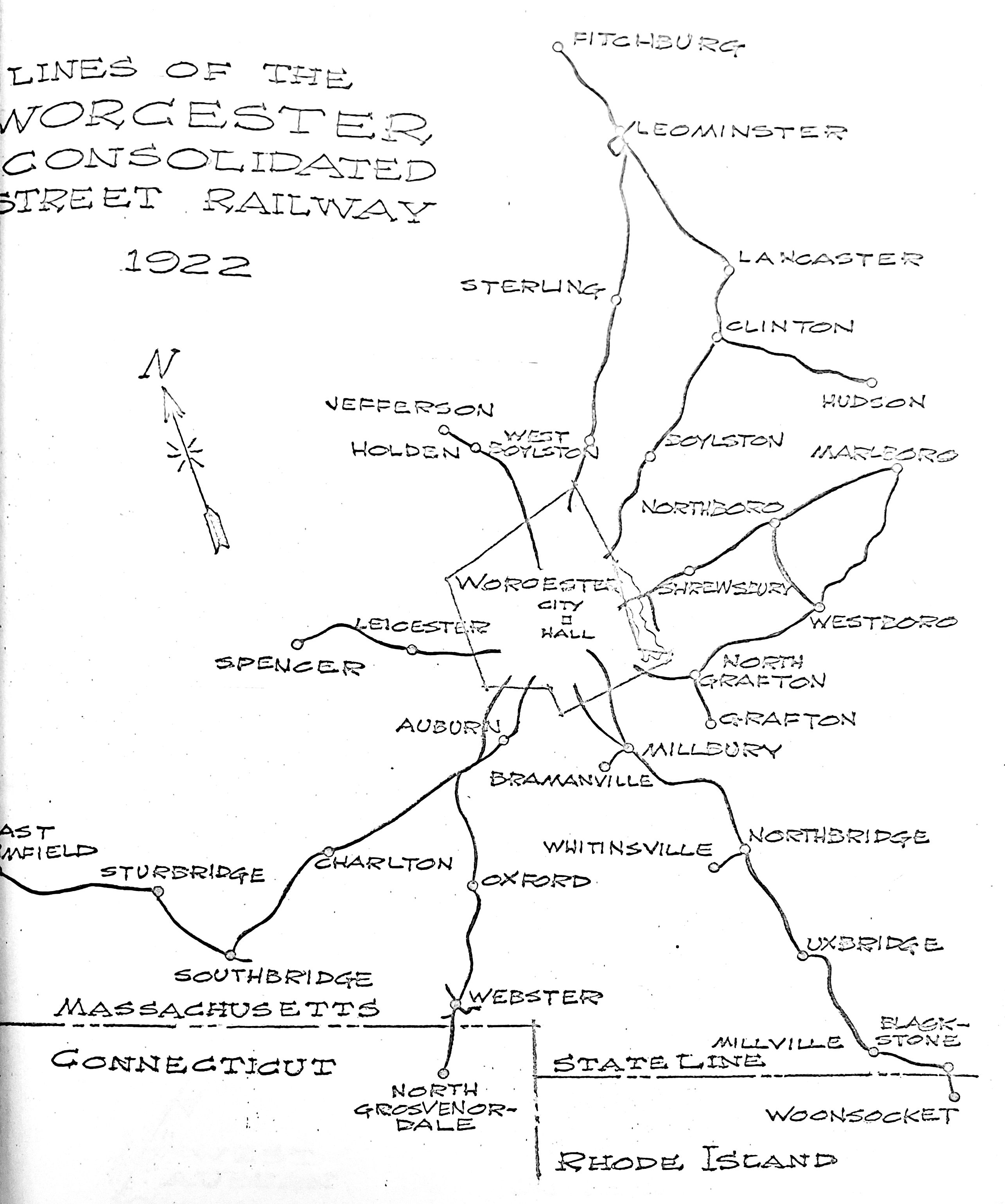

The Worcester Consolidated Street Railway (WCSR) was a streetcar and later bus system in Worcester and surrounding areas of Central Massachusetts, United States. Its earliest predecessor opened in 1863 and its final successor closed in 1978. The third-largest streetcar system in Massachusetts, it operated a dense network of urban lines in Worcester plus rural lines across Central Massachusetts. At peak size in the late 1910s, it operated 547 streetcars over 252 miles (406 km) of track, carrying 69.8 million annual passengers over 40 routes. The WCSR had a number of powerhouses and carhouses, many inherited from other companies it acquired. Freight service was operated from 1912 to 1927.

The system originated as the Worcester Horse Railway – later the Worcester Street Railway – which was formed in 1861 and opened in 1863. It was acquired in 1887 by the Citizens' Street Railway, which opened the previous year. The combined company became the Worcester Consolidated Street Railway. The first electric streetcar line opened in 1891; electric cars replaced horsecars on the system over the next two years. The WCSR expanded its city lines through the 1890s and acquired several smaller companies. The New Jersey-based Worcester Traction Company acquired the WCSR in 1894.

Other companies built a network of rural streetcar lines in the 1890s and 1900s, connecting Worcester with smaller cities and towns across Worcester County. A syndicate purchased the WCSR and some of the rural lines in 1900; they were merged in 1901 under control of the Worcester Railways and Investment Corporation. The New York, New Haven and Hartford Railroad (New Haven) began buying up New England streetcar companies in 1904. Using a nominally-independent subsidiary to skirt state law, it acquired the WCSR and most of the remaining independent lines around Worcester. Several were merged with the WCSR in 1911; by 1912, the WCSR system had been formed from 17 formerly independent companies. The rural network and most of the city network were constructed by 1906, though some city line extensions were built in the 1910s.

Despite the New Haven's early optimistic predictions, the street railway industry began a steep decline in the late 1910s. The WCSR cut almost all of its suburban and rural lines – which were subsidized by the busier city lines – between 1924 and 1930. The company began buying buses in 1925 to replace unprofitable streetcar lines and expand into new territory. In 1927, the New Haven took direct ownership of the company and made improvements to the city system. The WCSR entered foreclosure in 1931; it was sold the next year and reorganized as the Worcester Street Railway. Many of the city lines were replaced with buses in the 1930s.

Conversion of the remaining five streetcar routes was delayed by material rationing during World War II. It eventually took place in November and December 1945. Due to postwar ridership losses and increased operating costs, the company was nearly liquidated in 1952. It was sold that December and renamed as the Worcester Bus Company the next year. Public subsidies began in 1973. The public Worcester Regional Transit Authority took over the system in June 1978 and the Worcester Bus Company was closed. Several former powerhouses, substations, carhouses, and waiting rooms from the streetcar system remain extant. The final streetcars were sold to Brazil and operated there until 1970; two are preserved at a museum in Porto Alegre.

== System ==
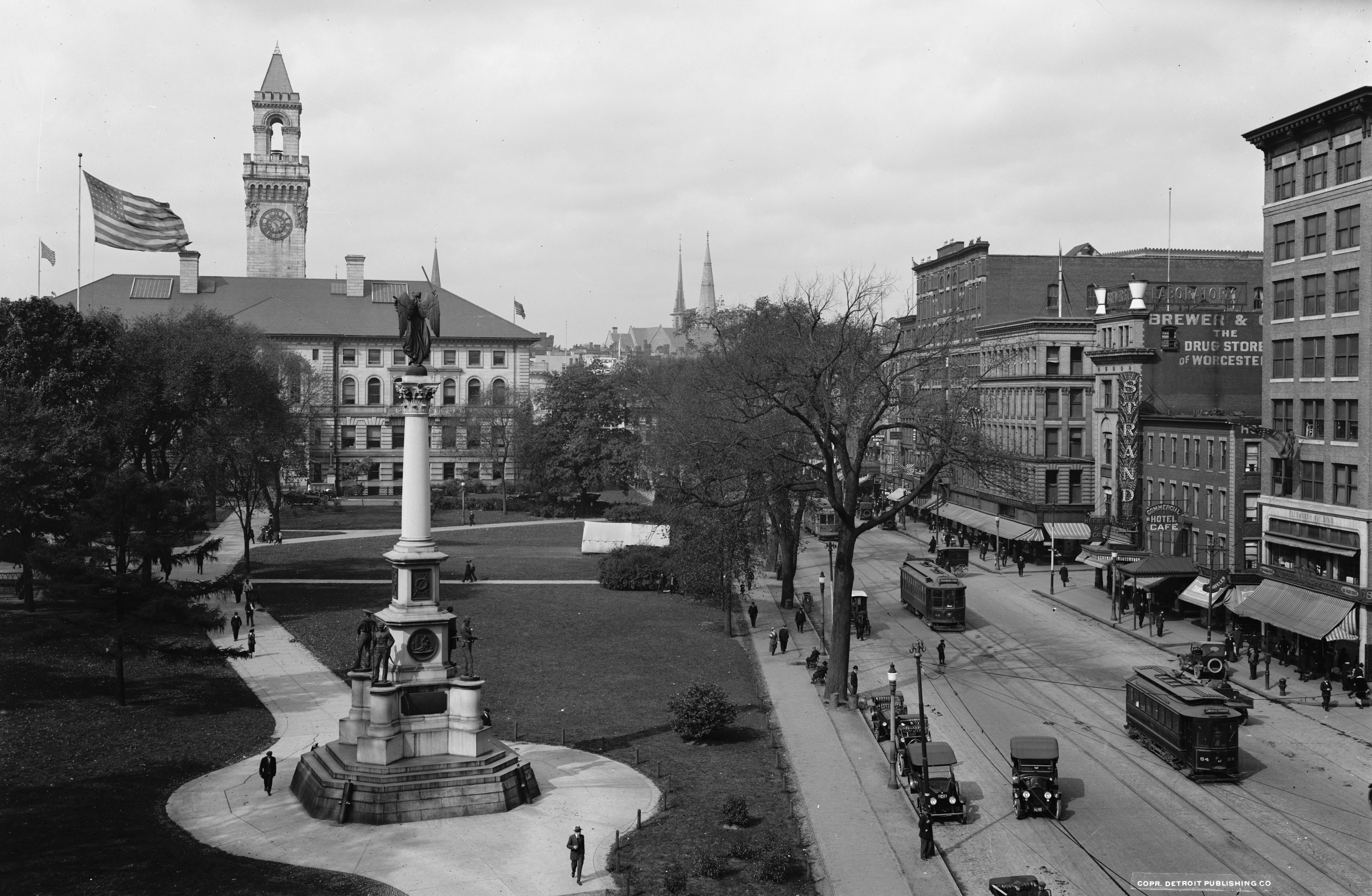
Streetcars at Worcester City Hall, the center of the system

The Worcester Consolidated Street Railway was the third-largest streetcar system in Massachusetts (after the Boston Elevated Railway and Eastern Massachusetts Street Railway). It operated a dense network of urban lines in Worcester plus rural lines across Central Massachusetts. At its maximum extent, the rural lines of the system stretched north to Fitchburg, west to Brimfield, south to the Connecticut state line at Webster, southeast to the Rhode Island state line at Blackstone, and east to Hudson and Marlborough. The system covered an area about 30 miles (48 km) east–west and 40 miles (64 km) north–south.

In 1918, near its peak, the company owned 209.97 miles (337.91 km) of streetcar lines, leased 28.81 miles (46.37 km), and operated over 13.29 miles (21.39 km) owned by other companies for a total of 252.07 miles (405.67 km). Approximately one-third of the track mileage was inside the city of Worcester, with two-thirds making up the rural lines. As with most rural streetcar lines in New England, the company's lines outside Worcester were more similar to extended city lines than to true interurbans. They operated largely on public roads rather than on private rights-of-way, with accordingly slow speeds, and used zone-based fares rather than distance-based fares. By 1912, the company had 34.6 miles (55.7 km) of private right-of-way, representing about 15% of the system. After the 1909–1911 elimination of most grade crossings in Worcester, the WCSR had 15 grade crossings of mainline railroads, of which three were industrial spur tracks.

The company carried 69.8 million passengers in 1918. Worcester City Hall was the center of the system, with almost all routes passing by it. Most routes passed through the city center, though some terminated at City Hall or Union Station. Hourly overnight service was run on some of the city lines.

In 1916, the WCSR operated 40 streetcar routes: (Note: The listing in the source does not include Webster local routes. By 1921, the WCSR operated North Village–Perryville and Beacon Park–Perryville service.)

- 1 June and Providence Streets
- 2 Tatnuck and Salisbury Street
- 3 Elm Park and Boynton Street
- 4 Summit and Greenwood Street
- 5 City Hall and Lake Shore
- 6 Lincoln Square and Union Station.
- 7 Jefferson and Bramanville
- 8 Boston and Worcester (Note: This route was the portion of the Boston and Worcester Street Railway (B&W) within Worcester limits, operated by WCSR crews. B&W cars originally used the Lake View line; some cars began using tracks on Shrewsbury and Belmont streets by 1911, and all B&W service used that route after 1925.)
- 9 City Line and Union Station
- 10 Worcester and Grafton
- 11 Worcester and Westboro
- 12 Worcester, Shrewsbury, and Marlboro
- 13 Northboro, Westboro, and Marlboro
- 14 Moore Avenue and Union Station
- 15 Summer Street and City Hall
- 20 Webster Square and Barber's Crossing
- 21 Leicester Line and Burncoat Street
- 22 Leicester Line and Lincoln Street
- 23 Webster Square and Union Station
- 24 Lake View and Hadwen Park
- 25 Coe's Square and Franklin Street
- 26 Columbus Park and Normal School
- 27 Columbus Park and City Hall
- 28 Belmont and Upsala Streets
- 29 Canterbury and Hamilton Streets
- 30 Grant Square and South Worcester
- 31 Worcester and Spencer
- 32 Webster Square and Lincoln Square
- 33 Prospect Park and City Hall
- 40 Worcester and Fitchburg via Sterling
- 41 Worcester and Fitchburg via Clinton
- 42 Lancaster and Hudson
- 43 Leominster crosstown
- 45 Worcester and Woonsocket
- 46 Plummers Corner and Whitinsville
- 50 Worcester and Springfield
- 51 Sandersdale
- 52 Worcester and Auburn
- 53 Worcester and Webster
- 55 Webster – Connecticut State Line

=== Fares ===
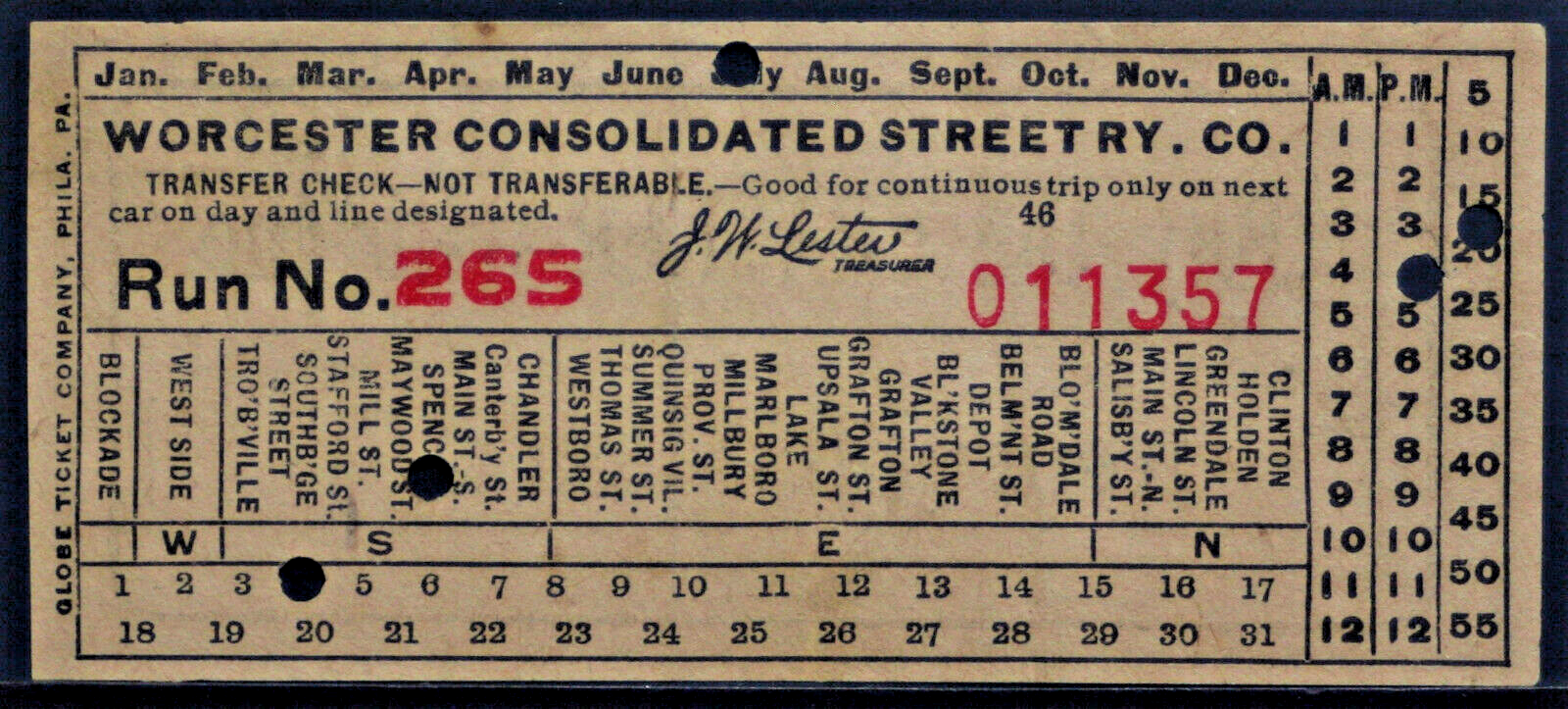
WCSR transfer slip

The base fare for the city lines was seven cents from 1869 to 1881, with an additional five cents charged for transfers. It was reduced to five cents with free transfers in 1881. The base fare was increased to ten cents in February 1921. It increased to 15 cents (or two rides for 25 cents) in 1950; by that time, transfers cost five cents. The discount was eliminated in April 1952, establishing a straight 15-cent base fare. Another increase in December 1955 created a 20-cent fare with a three-for-50-cents discount. That changed to four-for-75-cents in May 1958. Fares reached 25 cents by 1966 and 40 cents by 1973.

=== Streetcars and buses ===
In 1918, the company operated 547 streetcars: 321 closed cars, 187 open cars, and 39 unpowered trailer cars. Other equipment included 20 freight cars, 50 work cars, 33 snowplows, and 2 locomotives. Most of the equipment dated from the earlier years of the company and its acquired lines; only 112 of those 547 streetcars were built after 1910. The oldest cars were single-truck cars, many converted from horsecars. The WCSR began buying double-truck cars around 1892, and all cars purchased after 1902 were double-truck. Interior lengths of the closed cars varied from 18 feet (5.5 m) to 36.5 feet (11.1 m); open cars had seven to fifteen rows of benches. (Note: Interior lengths do not include the vestibules; for example, the 30-foot (9.1 m) cars of the 1927 order were 40 feet 8 inches (12.40 m) in overall length.) A parlor car, the Huguenot, originally belonged to the Worcester and Southbridge Street Railway.

Almost all streetcars acquired by the WCSR after 1910 – and about 100 acquired before then — were produced by the Osgood Bradley Car Company, which had its headquarters in Worcester. (Note: The only exceptions were six cars produced by Wason Manufacturing Company in 1913 as part of a joint order with the Springfield Street Railway.) Ten more cars were delivered from Osgood Bradley in 1920, and an additional ten in 1924. The final streetcars purchased by the WCSR were 50 lightweight 44-seat city cars in 1927. (Note: Osgood Bradley and successor Pullman-Standard continued to produce transit vehicles in Worcester until 1960, including around 2,000 trolleybuses and 1,000 PCC streetcars, but none of them were purchased by the WCSR or its successors.) Only the 1924 and 1927 cars remained in use after 1939. In the 1930s, they were painted with orange with a wide cream stripe around the windows. From 1907 to the 1920s, a test car owned by the Worcester Polytechnic Institute was based in the Institute's Electrical Engineering Building, served by a spur from the Salisbury Street line. It operated across the New England street railway system performing electrical continuity testing.

The WCSR acquired its first 80 buses from 1925 to 1931. Most had 29 seats and were manufactured by Yellow Coach (later part of General Motors). Ten Mack buses were acquired in 1933, followed by 15 from Yellow Coach in 1934. Between 1934 and 1940, the WCSR bought 97 American Car and Foundry (ACF) buses. By 1941, the WCSR owned 154 buses, which were painted reddish-orange below the windows and cream above. Postwar, the company purchased new buses from several different manufacturers; the older buses were retired by the end of the decade. As ridership dropped, the bus fleet was reduced from 237 in 1948 to 164 in 1953. The Worcester Bus Company replaced the fleet of gasoline buses with cheaper-to-operate diesel buses over the following decade. It also introduced a new color scheme: green below the windows and cream above, with a silver roof.

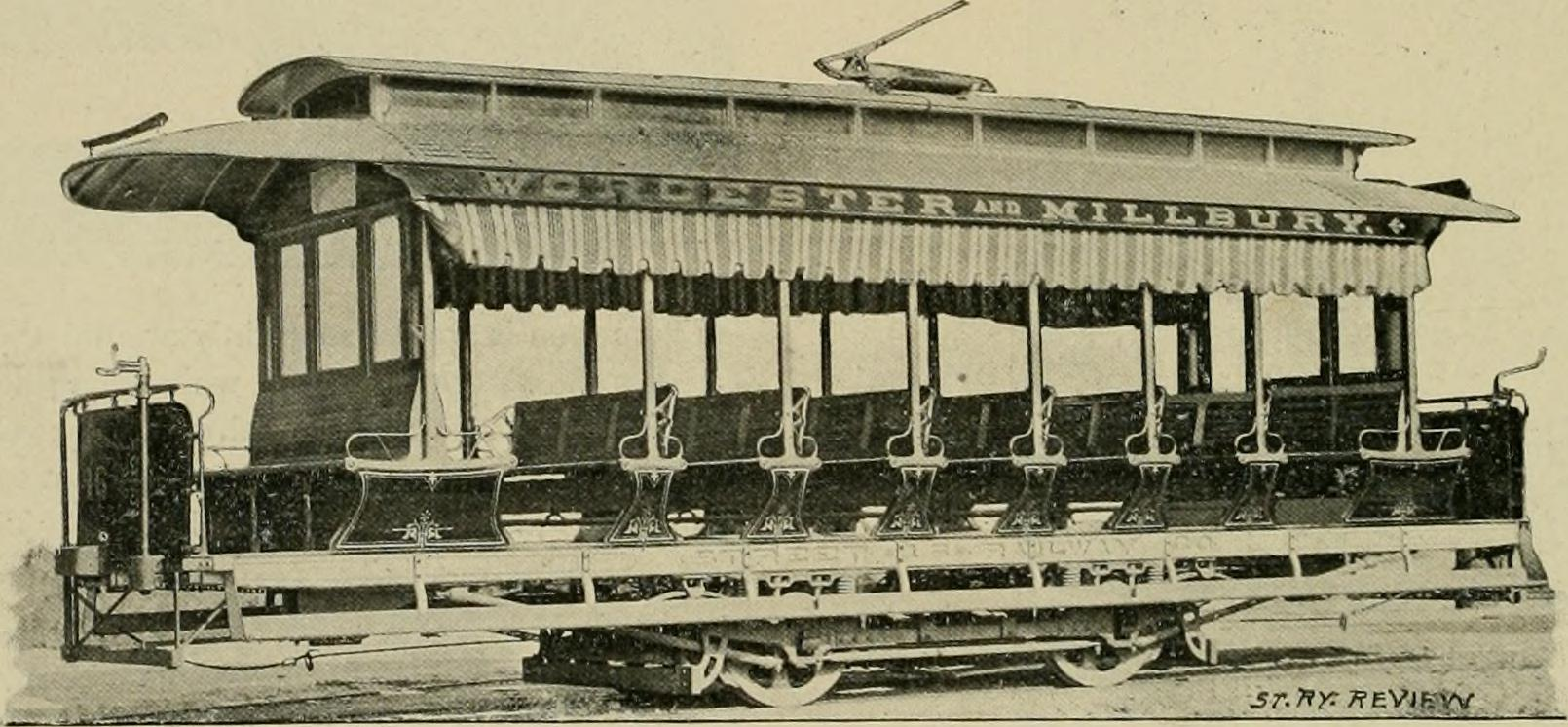
An 1893 single-truck open car

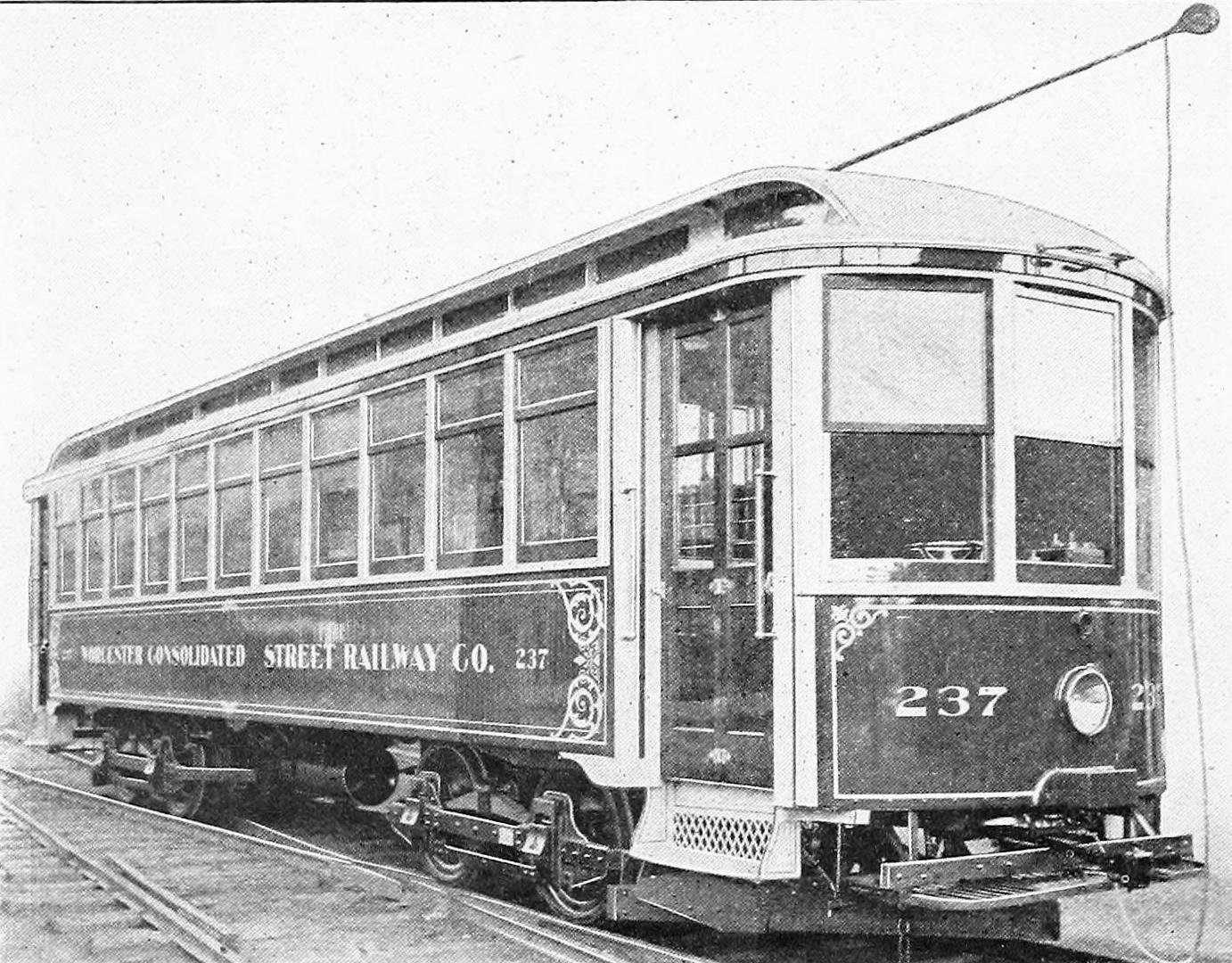
A 1902 double-truck closed car

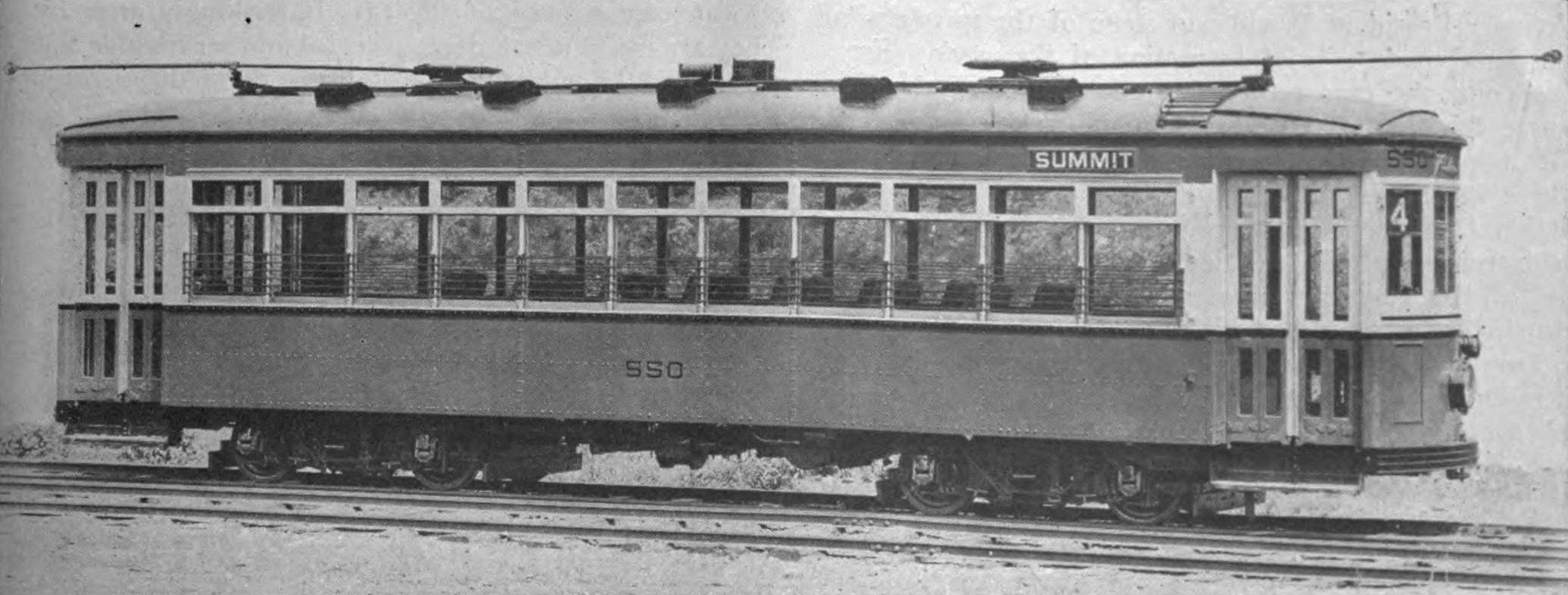
A 1927 double-truck closed car

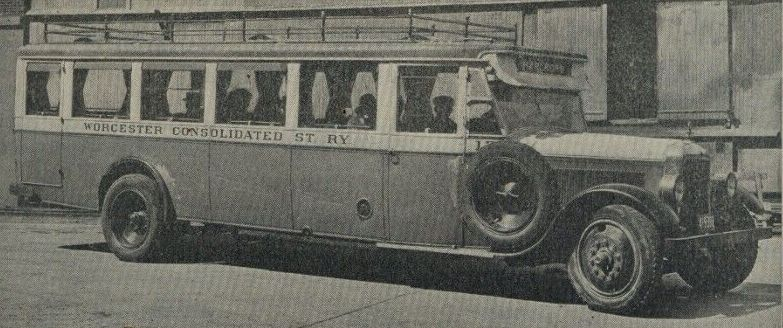
Yellow Coach bus in 1926

=== Carhouses ===
The main Worcester carhouse and maintenance facility, the Market Street carhouse, was located near Lincoln Square in the block bounded by Main, Market, Union, and School streets. A carhouse and stables were established there by 1870; the complex grew to occupy much of the block by the early 1890s. Several of those buildings were replaced in 1893 by a new two-story carhouse, measuring 128 by 300 feet (39 m × 91 m), which was designed for the new electric streetcars. Another expansion in 1903 included an office building designed by Frost, Briggs & Chamberlain that fronted on Market Street. The Romanesque Revival structure had an archway for streetcars to enter the carhouse directly from Main Street.

A second carhouse was located on Curtis Street near Webster Square by the 1890s. In 1901–02, the WCSR built Gates Lane carhouse about 1/2 mile (1 km) to the west. It was enlarged in 1912 to a capacity of 170 streetcars. In 1927–28, as part of the New Haven's modernization program, the company built a new carhouse and bus garage on Grove Street near the Rural Cemetery. It initially had storage for about 200 streetcars and 50 buses; the garage was substantially expanded by 1932. Gates Lane carhouse closed in February 1928. After 1940, all streetcars operated from Market Street and all buses from Grove Street. The WCSR also had a number of smaller carhouses across its rural system, most inherited from the lines it acquired.

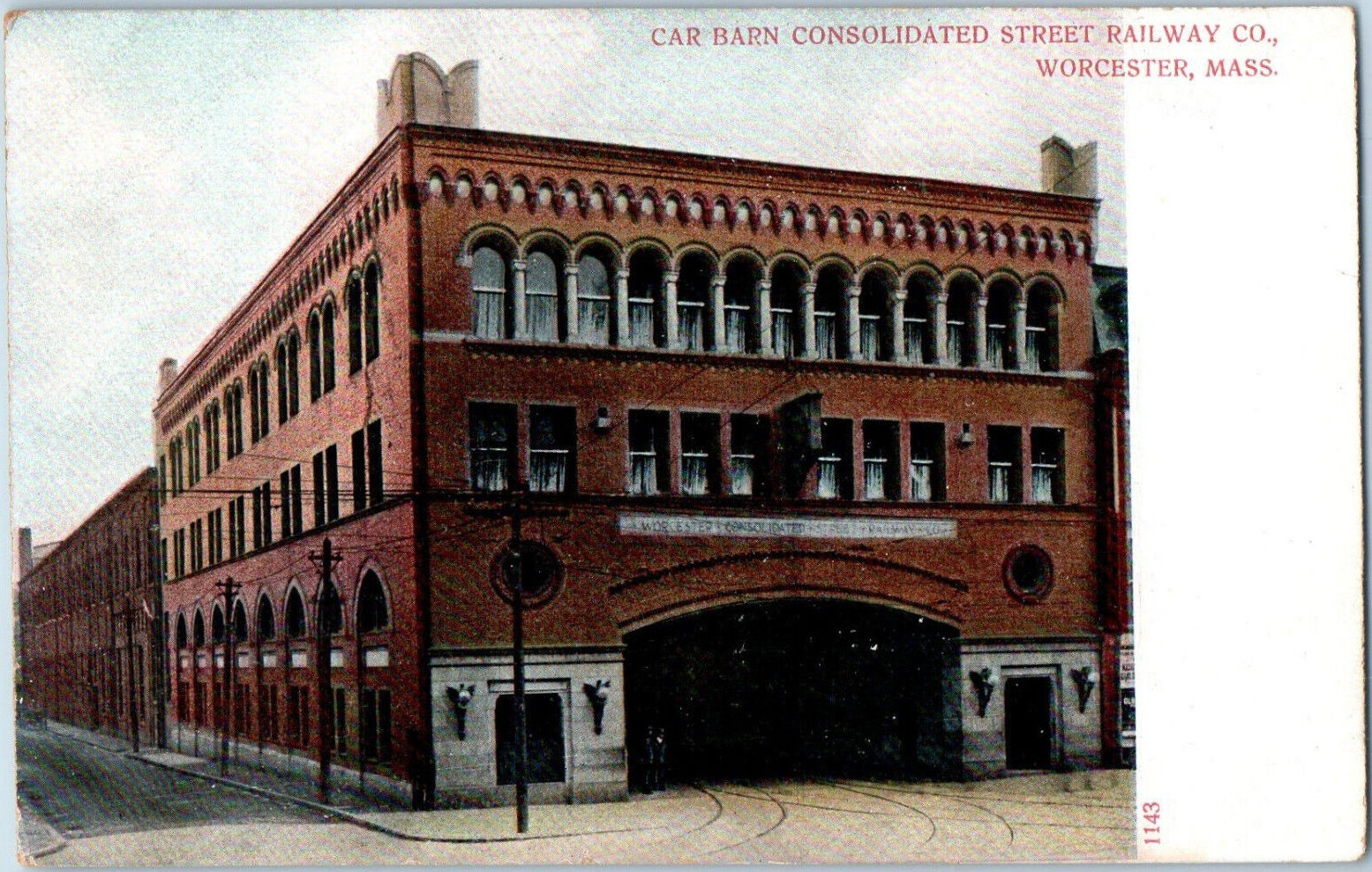
Postcard view of the office building and Market Street carhouse

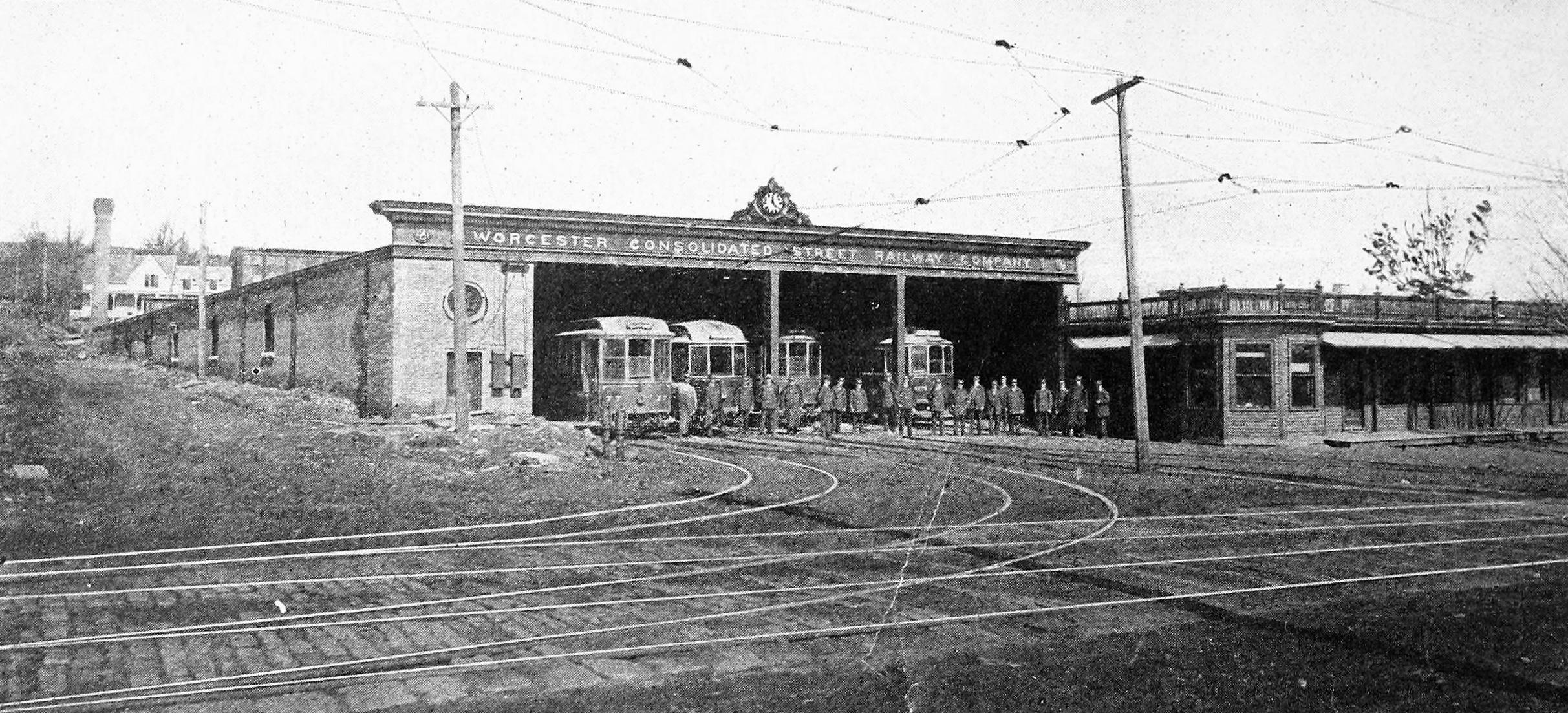
Gates Lane carhouse in 1902

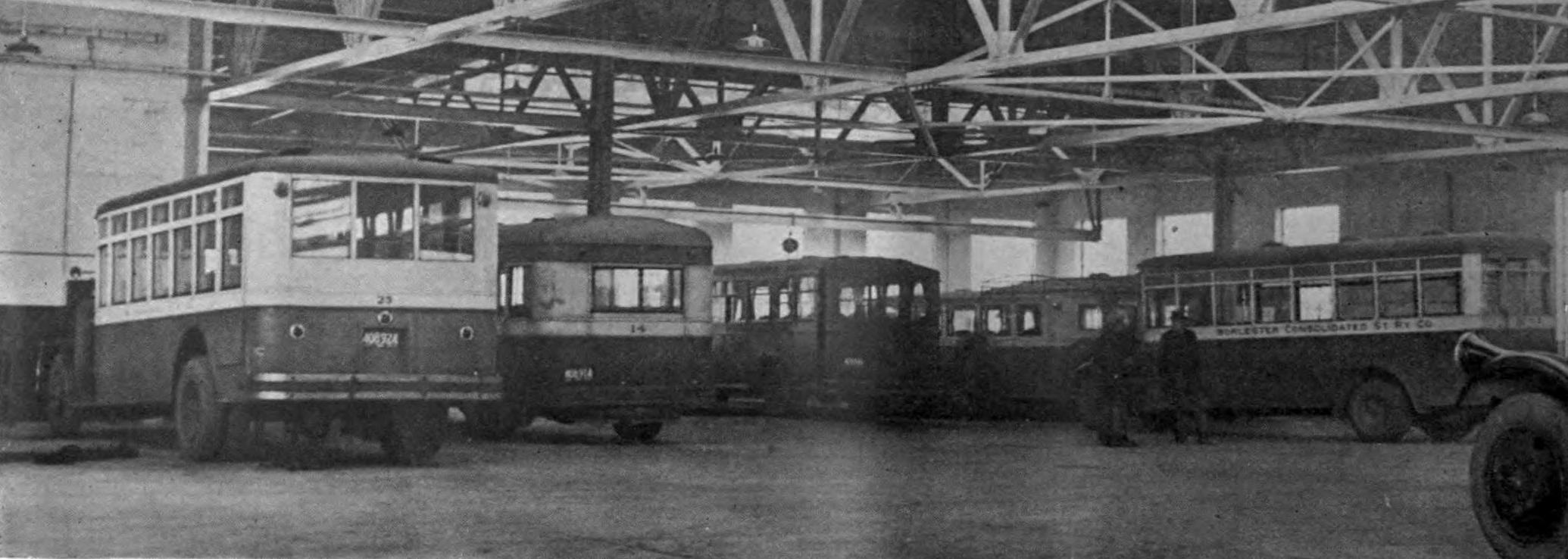
Buses in the Grove Street garage

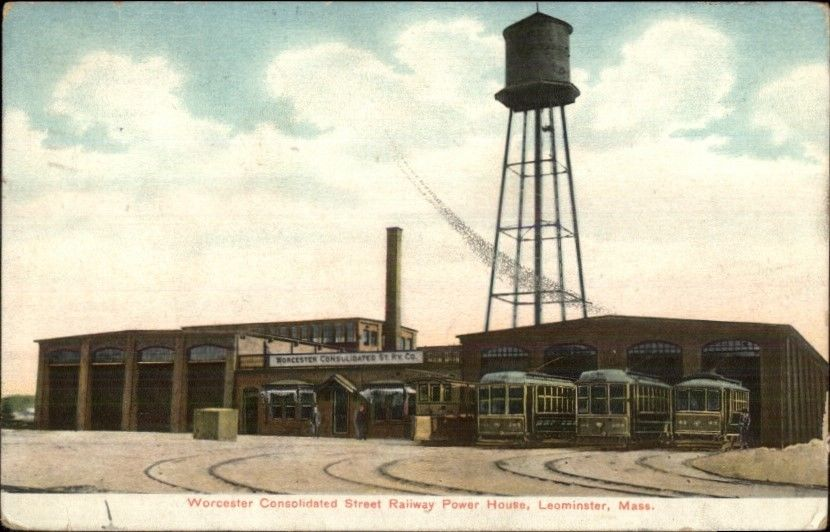
Postcard view of the Leominster carhouse

=== Freight service ===
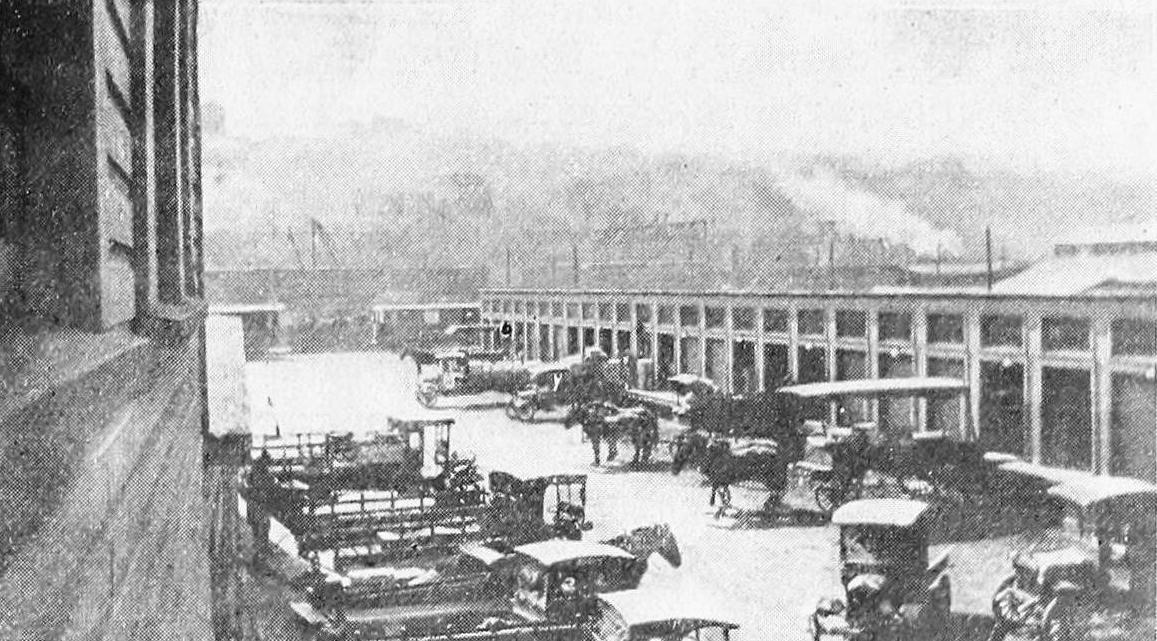
The Worcester freight terminal in 1921

Like many street railways, the WCSR was originally built solely for passenger service; freight and express service was only operated from 1912 to 1927. Freight and express business was managed by another New Haven subsidiary, the Electric Express Company, though the WCSR owned the equipment. The WCSR and the Boston and Worcester Street Railway (B&W) built a freight house on Green Street in 1912; it was replaced with a larger facility off Shrewsbury Street in 1918. Springfield–Boston and Springfield–Providence through freight service, jointly operated with other New Haven-owned systems and the B&W, began in 1921. The Providence through service ended in 1924 when the Milford, Attleborough and Woonsocket Street Railway was abandoned. The B&W, WCSR, and Springfield Street Railway established a joint container freight service in 1926 – just a year before low revenue prompted the latter two companies to abandon freight service entirely.

=== Power system ===
Starting in 1893, the main powerhouse for the city lines was a 5.65-megawatt (7,580 hp) steam generating plant located on Fremont Street in Worcester. With the expansions and acquisitions of the early 20th century, the WCSR had additional steam generating plants for suburban lines located in Millbury, Holden, Charlton City, Berlin, Northborough, and Leominster by the 1910s. These were smaller plants intended for low-frequency suburban services, with ratings of 225 kilowatts (302 hp) to 800 kilowatts (1,100 hp). The Leominster facility also had 500 kilowatts (670 hp) of hydroelectric generating capability. Distributing substations were located in Oxford, Webster, Leicester, and Sturbridge; a fifth at Charlton City was added in 1913.

In 1911, the WCSR modernized its power system. The Millbury powerhouse was expanded with a 5-megawatt (6,700 hp) steam turbine; a second turbine of the same rating was installed in 1913. (Note: Some sources list the initial turbine as a 5.5-megawatt (7,400 hp) unit.) The Fremont Street powerhouse was relegated to auxiliary use. A new distribution substation – then the largest substation in New England – was constructed on Madison Street in Worcester. Its four rotary converters, with a combined capacity of 7 megawatts (9,400 hp), provided 600 volt direct current power to the streetcar lines. The Millbury powerhouse and the Madison Street substation were connected by 13.2 kV transmission lines.

Around 1912, the WCSR began using hydroelectric power supplied by the Connecticut River Transmission Company. A switching station at the Millbury plant fed into the Madison Street substation and the five smaller distributing substations. Substations in northern Worcester, Fitchburg, Leominster, Berlin, Northborough, and West Boylston supplied the northern suburban lines. With the addition of hydroelectric power, the older steam generating plants were reduced to reserve status. By 1934, the company no longer produced its own power; all electricity was purchased from the New England Power Company (successor to the Connecticut River Transmission Company).

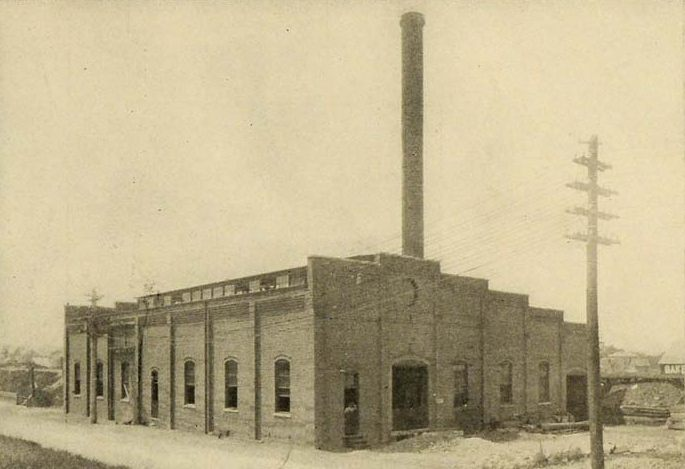
Fremont Street powerhouse around 1898

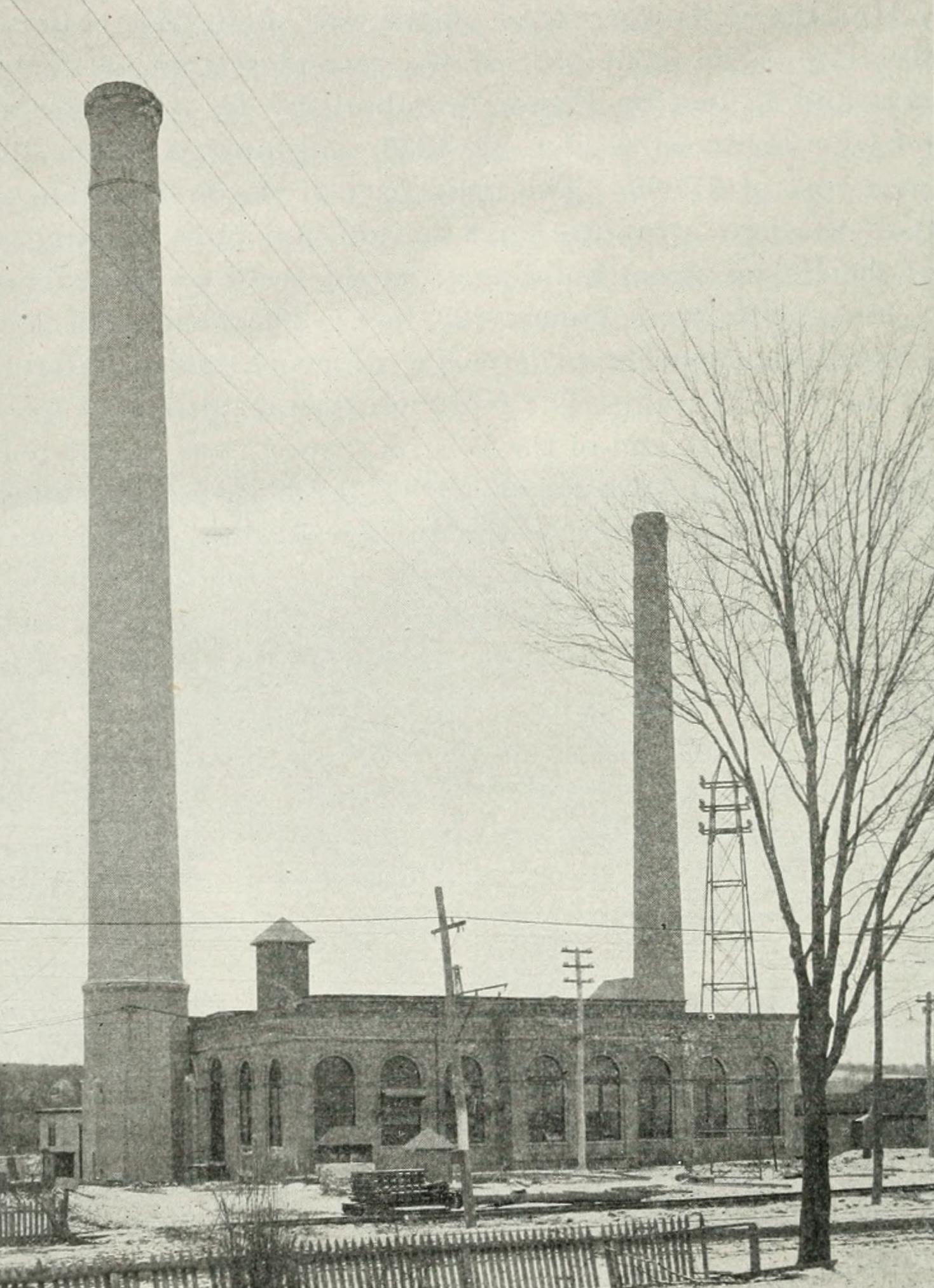
Millbury powerhouse in 1911

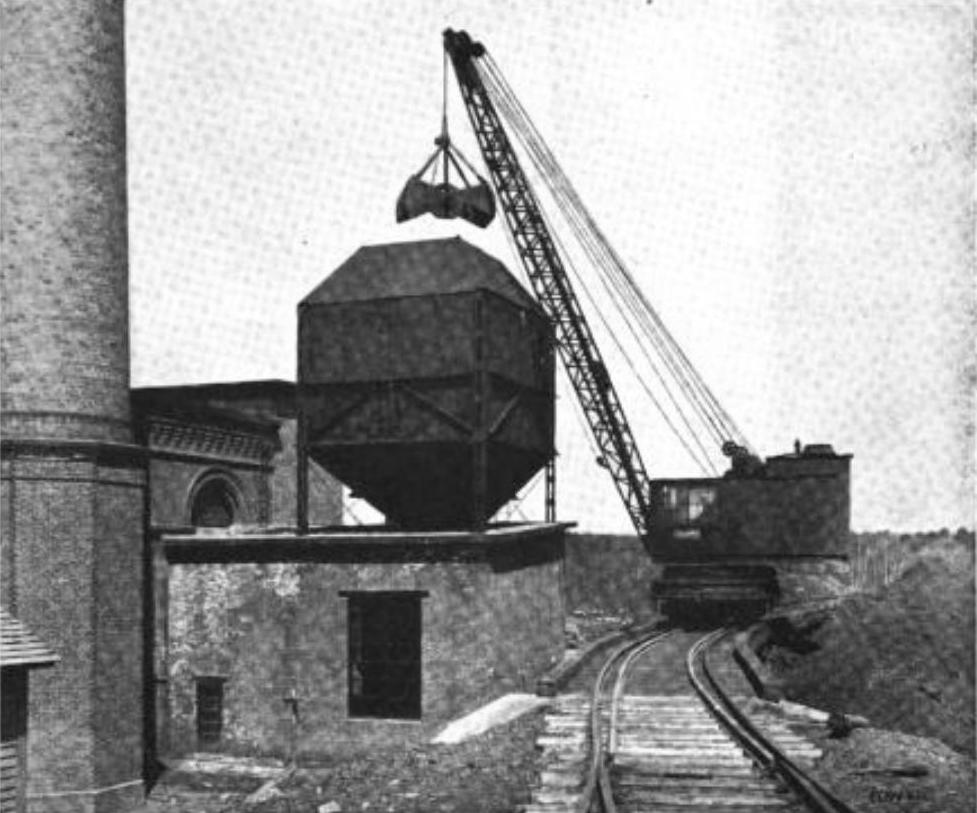
Coal crane at Millbury powerhouse

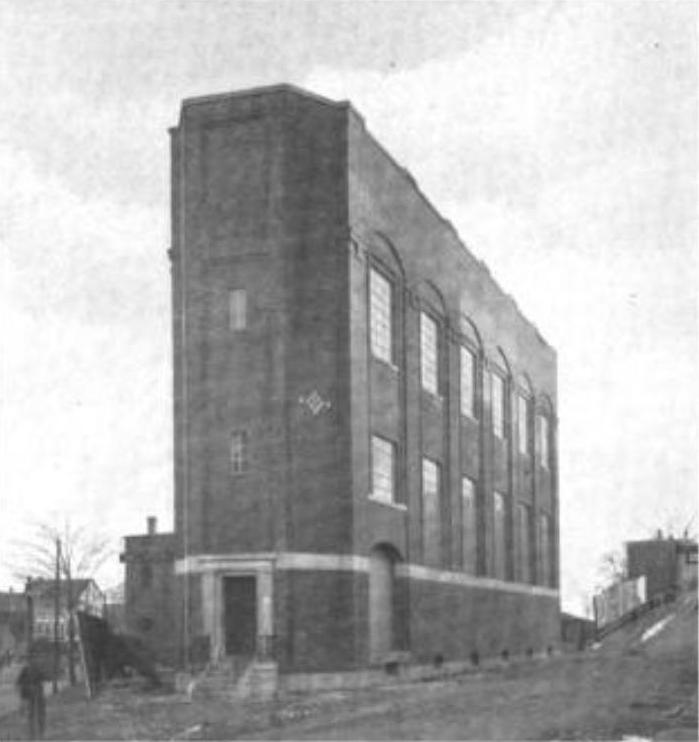
Madison Street substation in 1911

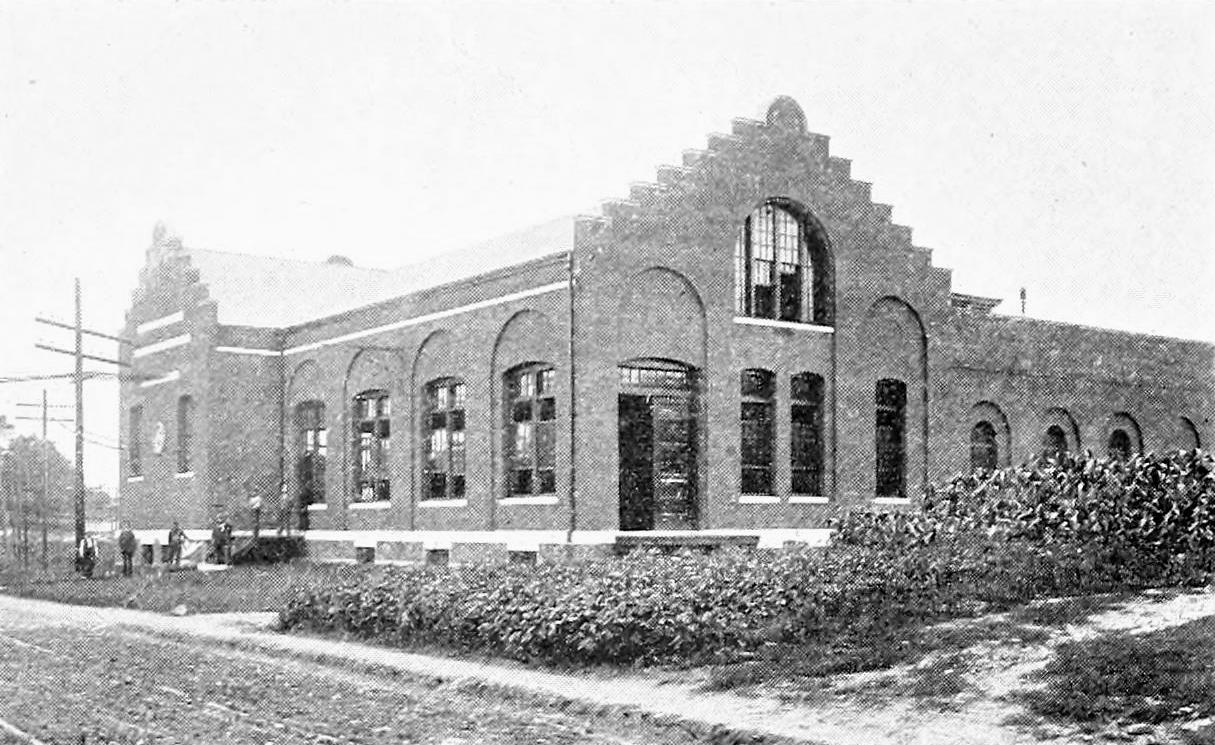
Charlton City powerhouse in 1901

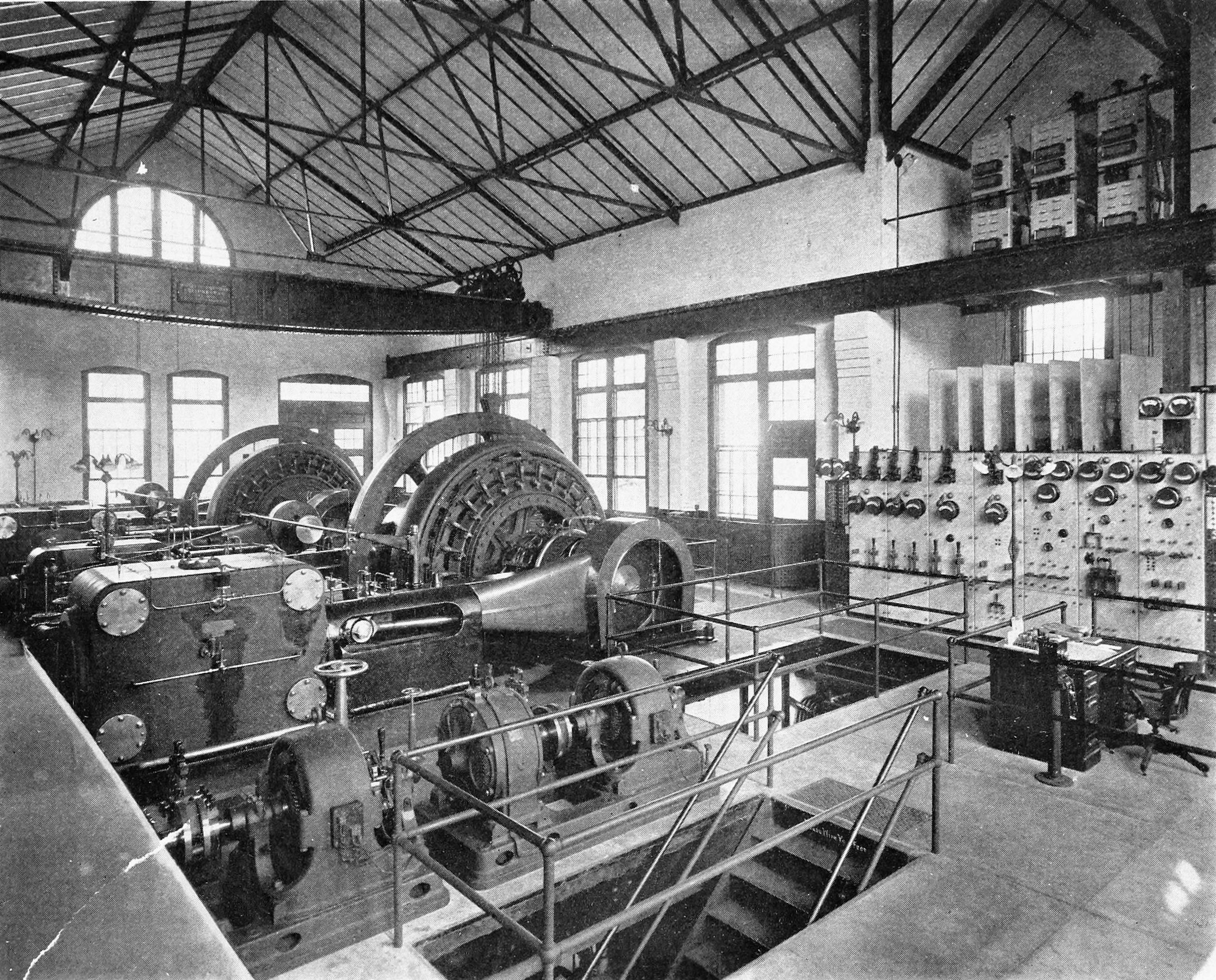
Engine room of Charlton City powerhouse

== History ==
=== Formation ===
The earliest predecessor of the Worcester Consolidated was the Worcester Horse Railway. It was chartered by an act approved by the state legislature on April 6, 1861, with capital of $100,000 (equivalent to $3 million in 2024). Its first horsecar line ran from Webster Square through downtown to Bell Hill via Main Street and Lincoln Street, with a spur on Front and Grafton streets to the Western Railroad station. The line opened on September 1, 1863; a spur on Pleasant Street opened on November 3. The company was a financial failure; after a failed reorganization, it was seized for insolvency on April 25, 1866.

The legislature approved the formation of the Worcester Street Railway on April 12, 1867, to purchase the property and franchise. The Pleasant Street line was soon removed. The older company was merged into the Worcester Street Railway on December 23, 1867. The company did not resume service on the remaining lines, which caused the state supreme court to appoint a receiver. The property and franchise were sold at auction on August 24, 1869, and a new Worcester Street Railway was formed. (Note: Sources differ as to whether the price was $25,000 or $30,000.) The main line was extended north to Adams Square in 1881 – the first extension of the company – creating a 4.90-mile (7.89 km) system.

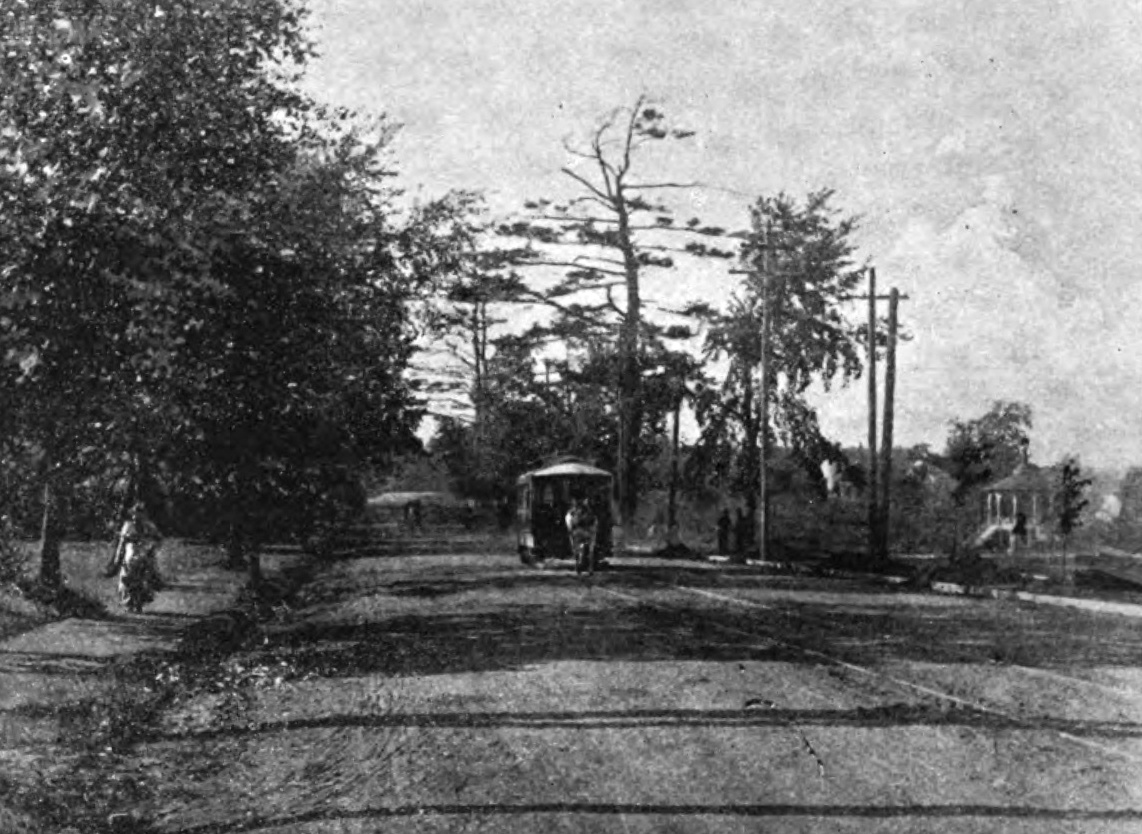
A horsecar on Salisbury Street around 1890

The Citizens' Street Railway was formed on February 27, 1886. By that September, it operated a four-route, 6.60-mile (10.62 km) system. Two routes ran from Union Station to Park Avenue and Worcester Polytechnic Institute via Pleasant Street. Another ran from Rural Cemetery to South Worcester via Grove, Main, and Southbridge streets, and the fourth ran from City Hall to Quinsigamond via Front, Green, and Millbury streets. The Citizens' Street Railway purchased the Worcester Street Railway effective May 31, 1887, and renamed the system as the Worcester Consolidated Street Railway (WCSR) on June 10. Several extensions were opened over the next three years. These included an extension on Grove Street to Chadwick Square in 1888, a line on Chandler Street and Park Avenue in 1890, and line on Grafton Street in 1890.

The WCSR was relatively late to use electric power. The company began electrifying with overhead lines in 1891. The first electrified service was a line to Lake Quinsigamond via Shrewsbury and Belmont streets, which opened on September 4, 1891. It was followed by a line from Main Street to Laurel Hill on December 30, 1891. At first, the two electric lines did not share tracks with the horsecar lines. The company's first power station, the Fremont Street station, was completed in 1893. The system was quickly converted to electric streetcars; the company owned 397 horses on September 30, 1893, and just six horses a year later. The final horsecars ran in November 1893. Several expansions were completed during this period, including a line on Providence Street, a line to Grant Square, and extension of the Pleasant Street line to Newton Square. Streetcars had a variety of colors and patterns that indicated which lines they operated on. By late 1894, the WCSR operated a 30.51-mile (49.10 km) system, entirely electrified. Other companies serving Worcester and surrounding towns – all of which the WCSR would later acquire – totaled about 28 miles (45 km) at that time.

=== Worcester Traction Company ===
The Worcester Traction Company was organized in New Jersey on December 24, 1894, and soon acquired the entire capital stock of the WCSR. It obtained ownership of the company's power station and was criticized for selling electricity and renting property to the WCSR at inflated rates. The Traction Company's stock was heavily watered. The city investigated the Traction Company in 1897. It found that only a small part of the Traction Company was owned by Worcester residents and that it had misled the public about the sources of funding for the system's electrification.

The WCSR leased three other rail companies in Worcester in 1895–1896: (Note: The Worcester and Shrewsbury Railroad and the Worcester and Shrewsbury Street Railway were merged with the WCSR in 1929, as was the North End in 1934.)

- The North End Street Railway was chartered on June 22, 1891. By September 1891, it opened a 0.64-mile (1.03 km) horsecar line running north from Adams Square on Burncoat Street. An extension northwest on North and Barber avenues, and a separate line on West Boylston Street from Chadwick Square to Barbers Crossing, opened by September 1892. Over the following year, the line was extended north to Greendale and south to Union Station via Lincoln Street and Summer Street for a total of 5.00 miles (8.05 km). Cars used the Foster Street track of the Worcester and Shrewsbury Street Railway to run to City Hall. The system was also electrified during that year. In December 1893, the North End and the Worcester Consolidated began sharing use of the two companies' tracks on Lincoln Street and Summer Street. The North End Street Railway was leased by the WCSR on August 1, 1895.

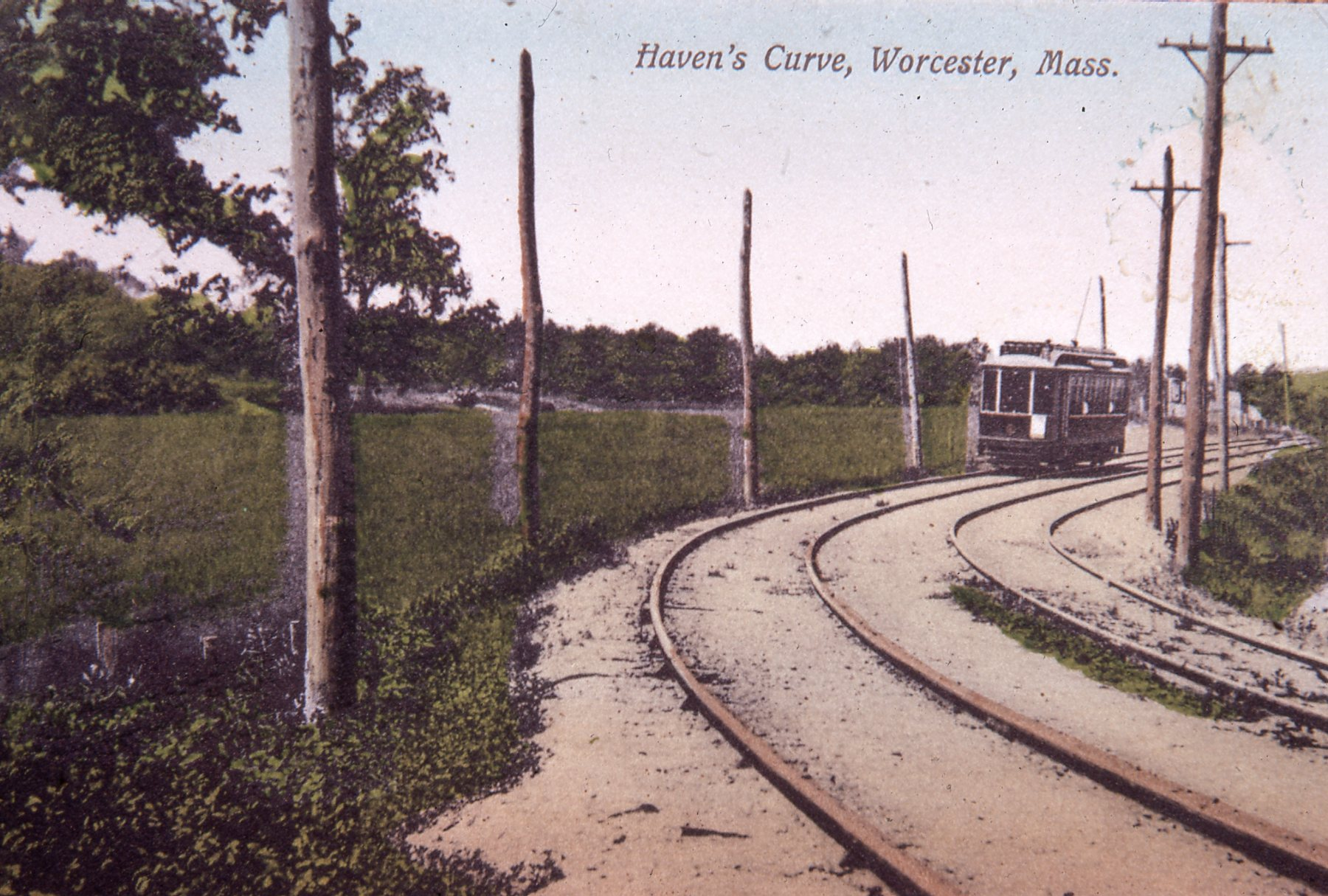
A streetcar on the converted Worcester and Shrewsbury Railroad

- The Worcester and Shrewsbury Railroad opened in 1873 as a narrow-gauge stream railroad from Union Station to Lake Quinsigamond. The WCSR leased the line on July 1, 1896, and laid its own streetcar track parallel to the existing track; steam service ended by 1900.
- The Worcester and Shrewsbury Street Railway (not related to the Worcester and Shrewsbury Railroad) was chartered on July 9, 1892, to build east from Worcester to Marlborough. However, the company only built 0.43 miles (0.69 km) of track in downtown Worcester. It was leased by the WCSR on July 1, 1896.

Expansion of the WCSR itself also continued. An extension of the Pleasant Street line to Richmond Heights was completed by 1896, as was trackage on Franklin Street and Salem Street downtown. The WCSR opened a line to Grafton via North Grafton – its first line outside Worcester city limits – on December 16, 1898. It featured a lengthy trestle over the Millbury Branch of the Boston and Albany Railroad at Millbury Junction. An extension of the Pleasant Street line to Tatnuck was opened on May 30, 1899, along with a spur on June Street from Pleasant Street to Chandler Street. The Salisbury Street line was extended to Forest Street on June 11. A branch on Maywood Street from Park Avenue to Columbus Park (Lovell Street) opened on November 30, 1899. The Southbridge Street line was extended from Stearns Square to Hope Avenue in 1900.

=== Worcester Railways and Investment Corporation ===
The first decade of the 20th century was a "period of rapid consolidation" for the street railways in Massachusetts as the city systems purchased suburban lines. Major consolidations with the WCSR occurred in 1900–01 and in 1910–11. The first began in the second half of March 1900, when a syndicate acquired control of six suburban street railways around Worcester:

==== Worcester and Suburban ====
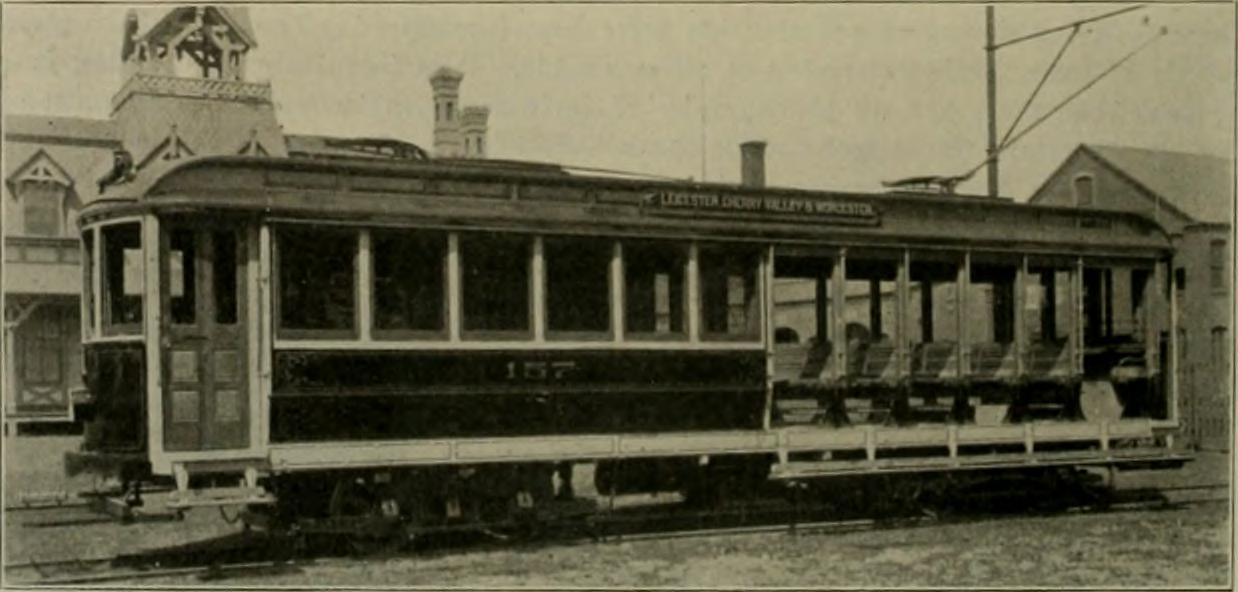
Worcester and Suburban streetcar

The Worcester, Leicester and Spencer Street Railway was organized on March 7, 1891. It opened from Salem Square to Leicester on August 18, 1891, with the full route to Spencer opened on September 8. It was the first line in the Worcester area to use electric power, as the initial segment to Leicester opened two weeks before the Consolidated's first electric line. The line ran primarily on the Upper Post Road between Spencer and Webster Square; within Worcester it followed Cambridge, Exeter, Fremont, Canterbury, Hammond, Southbridge, and Portland streets. A branch from Webster Square to Leesville (Hadwen Park) was added in 1892 or 1893. The company also planned, but never built, a line from Worcester to Southbridge via Rochdale and Charlton City.

The Worcester and Millbury Street Railway was chartered on May 13, 1892, and opened between Worcester and Bramanville via Millbury in October 1892. On May 12, 1893, the legislature authorized the Worcester, Leicester and Spencer to acquire other companies and change its name to the Worcester and Suburban Street Railway. The company merged with the Worcester and Millbury on January 18, 1895, and the renaming took effect on January 31.

==== Worcester and Marlborough ====
The Worcester and Marlborough Street Railway was chartered on April 26, 1897 and opened in stages that year. The segment between St. Anne's Cemetery in Shrewsbury (about 1/3 mile (0.5 km) east of Lake Quinsigamond) and the center of Northborough opened on June 30, with a short extension to the lake on July 11. It opened east to Marlborough on July 18, and a branch from Northborough to Westborough opened on August 11. Connection into Worcester was delayed by reconstruction of the Lake Quinsigamond causeway. Temporary track across part of the causeway was used in July. Through service between Worcester and Marlborough began on August 12, 1897. (Note: In Marlborough, streetcars used tracks of the Marlborough Street Railway (part of the Boston and Worcester Street Railway after 1902) between Broad Street and the downtown area. The trackage on West Main Street between Broad Street and Monument Square was leased to the WCSR and sold to it in 1915.) Passengers initially had to walk across the grade crossing of the Agricultural Branch in Northboro to transfer between streetcars. In March 1898, the state gave permission for the street railway to cross the railroad.

==== Leominster and Clinton ====
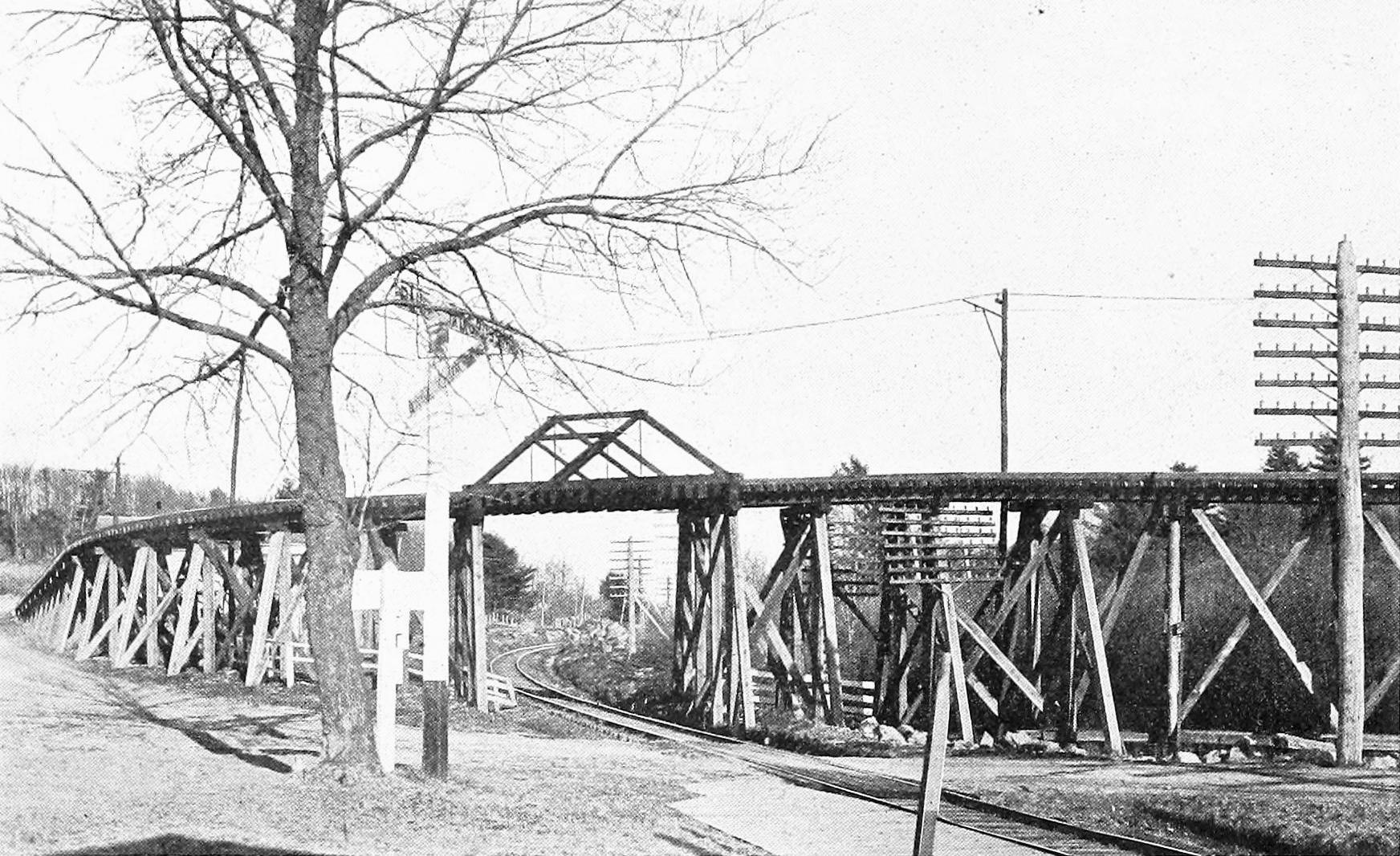
Trestle on the Clinton and Hudson at South Bolton

On October 17, 1900, four of the companies were merged as the Leominster and Clinton Street Railway:

The Clinton Street Railway was organized on April 26, 1893. It opened a 2.4-mile (3.9 km) line in Clinton on September 2, 1893. The line ran between Lancaster Mills and South Lancaster via downtown Clinton. A short extension south to the Acre neighborhood opened within the next year. On May 7, 1896, the state legislature gave permission for the company to change its name and extend to Leominster. The name change to Leominster and Clinton Street Railway was approved by stockholders on May 27. The extension to Leominster opened on June 20, 1896, making the line 12 miles (19 km) long.

The Worcester and Clinton Street Railway was organized on March 3, 1898. It opened between Adams Square (Brittan Square) in Worcester and near Lancaster Mills in Clinton via Main Street / Boylston Street on December 11, 1898. In Clinton, the company used the tracks of the Leominster and Clinton Street Railway, terminating at Clinton House (High Street at Church Street). Worcester and Clinton Street Railway passengers had to change to WCSR cars at Adams Square until April 1899, when a track connection was completed there, allowing through service to Worcester City Hall over WCSR tracks.

The Fitchburg and Suburban Street Railway was organized on March 29, 1898. It opened between Fitchburg and Leominster via South Street and Merriam Avenue on July 16, 1898. A short crosstown line was built in Leominster in 1899. The Pleasant Street portion of the line opened on November 29, 1899, and the Water Street portion about a month later.

The Clinton and Hudson Street Railway was organized on May 24, 1899. It opened between Clinton and Hudson via Berlin on April 18, 1900. The Concord, Maynard and Hudson Street Railway opened east from Hudson around October 1, 1901. It soon leased 0.35 miles (0.56 km) of track between Wood Square and the Hudson railroad station; Clinton service thereafter terminated at Wood Square, with passengers given free transfers over the leased section.

==== Consolidation ====
In November 1900, the syndicate agreed to purchase the WCSR from the Worcester Traction Company and merge it with the suburban lines. Contrary to previous rumors of Standard Oil, the Montana Copper Kings, or the Worcester Traction Company being behind the syndicate, it was revealed to be businessmen from Worcester and Boston. The consolidation brought about changes in routes, including additional through services, and fares were reduced for some suburban trips. The Worcester and Suburban, the Worcester and Marlborough, and the Leominster and Clinton were merged with the WCSR on February 23, 1901.

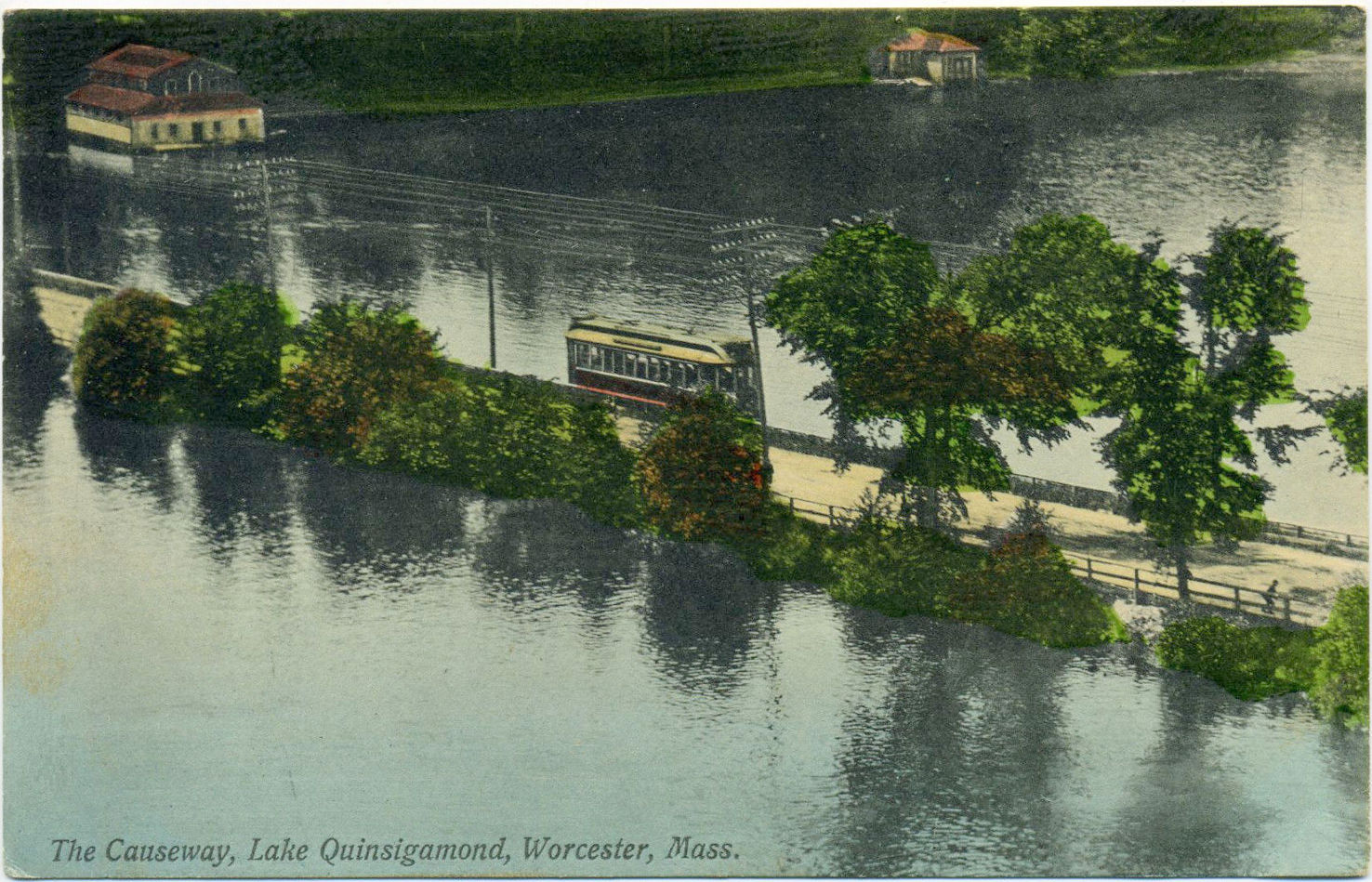
A Boston and Worcester Street Railway streetcar on the Lake Quinsigamond causeway

In July 1901, a group represented by Vermilye and Company created the Worcester Railways and Investment Corporation as a holding company for the WCSR and associated lines. It was backed with capital of $6 million (equivalent to $180 million in 2024). Its acquisition of the WCSR was the largest financial transaction in Worcester up to that time. The Worcester Traction Company, no longer possessing any street railways, was dissolved by its stakeholders in late 1901. The Boston and Worcester Street Railway opened on July 1, 1903, using WCSR trackage within Worcester and part of Shrewsbury. It was the only streetcar line entering Worcester that was not eventually leased or purchased by the WCSR. (Note: However, at several points during 1906, the New Haven was rumored to be buying the Boston and Worcester.)

Several modifications to the city lines were completed in 1901–02. On November 21, 1901, the WCSR completed the installation of track and switches to form a double-track loop around Worcester Common. This allowed suburban cars to circle the Common or be through-routed with other lines, rather than the previous time-consuming process of reversing direction on stub-end tracks. A connector was added on Millbury Street near Quinsigamond Village in 1901 that allowed Millbury cars to use the more direct route on Millbury Street and Green Street rather than the route over Vernon Hill via Upsala Street. Tracks across Vernon Square were added in 1902, allowing Upsala Street cars to reach downtown via Green Street. The tracks on Water Street, built by the Worcester and Millbury in 1892, were removed. A short connector on Aitchison Street between the Lake View line and Shrewsbury Street was also built in 1901.

Several new city lines also opened in 1902. The Lake Shore line, which followed South Quinsigamond Avenue along the east shore of Lake Quinsigamond in Shrewsbury, opened in May 1902. The city council approved WCSR plans for a line on Bloomingdale Road (now Franklin Street) in December 1901 over a competing proposal from the People's Lake Line Street Railway. It opened in November 1902 along with a line on Belmont Street between Lincoln Square and Bell Pond. An extension of the Quinsigamond line on Greenwood Avenue opened on November 23. A line on Hamilton Street was also completed in 1902. The only substantial extension in 1903 was in Leominster, where a 1.29-mile (2.08 km) addition to the crosstown line (forming a loop) opened in September. The Tatnuck line was extended west by 691 feet (211 m) on October 28, 1904.

=== New Haven control ===
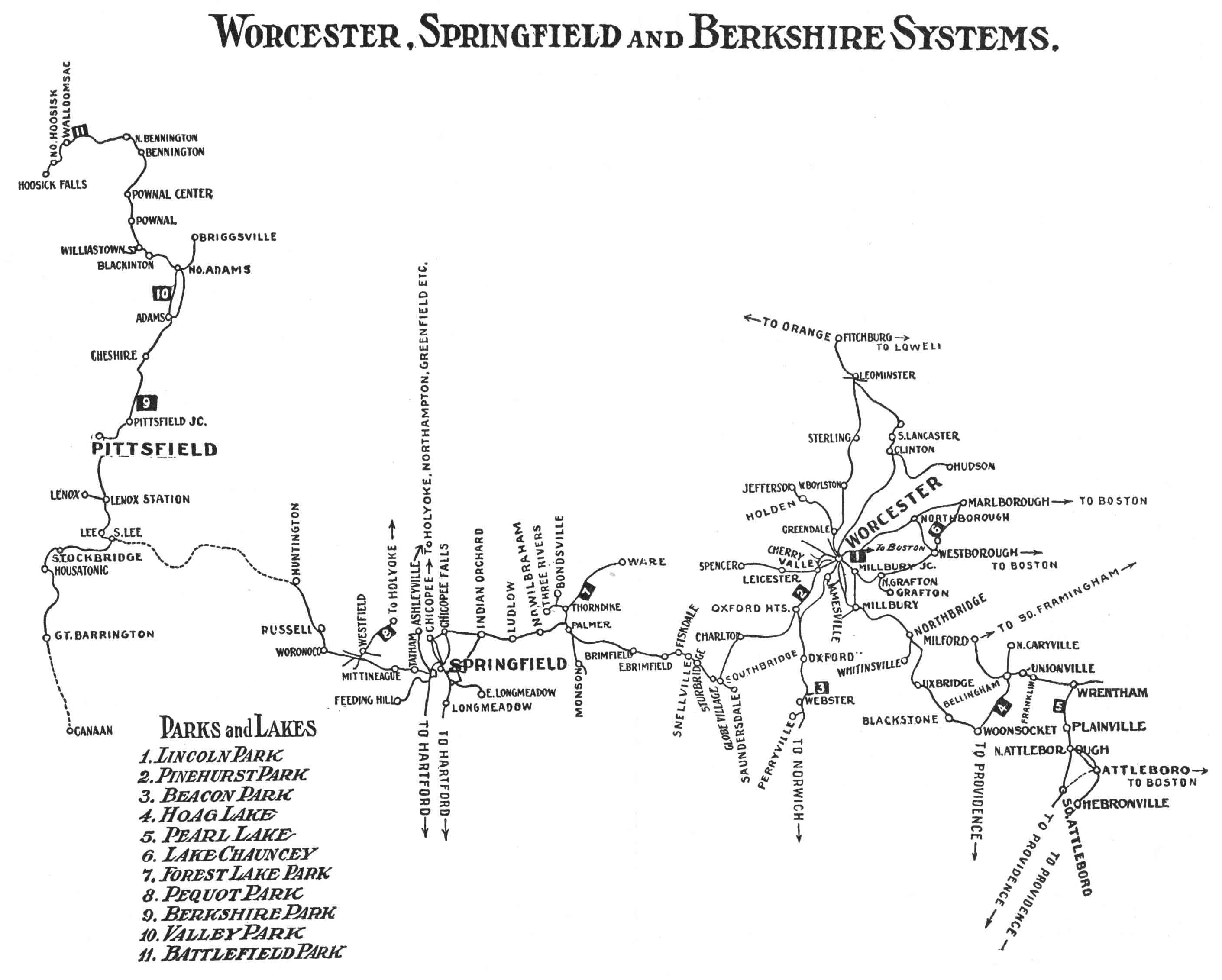
1908 map of the New Haven's street railway holdings in Massachusetts

In 1904, under the presidency of Charles Sanger Mellen, the New York, New Haven and Hartford Railroad (New Haven) began buying up street railways in southern New England to reduce competition and feed traffic to its railroad lines. A holding company, the Consolidated Railway, was used for the purchases. The New Haven began attempting to acquire the Worcester Railways and Investment Corporation in 1905 and made an offer in March 1906. A 1906 Massachusetts law prohibited railroads from acquiring other corporations – even indirectly – without legislative approval. On June 21, 1906, the New Haven created the New England Investment and Securities Company (NEISCo) as a "voluntary association" (trust) in an attempt to circumvent the law. The New England Investment and Securities Company announced in October 1906 that it had acquired majority control of the Worcester Railways and Investment Corporation. It also acquired most of the remaining independent suburban lines around Worcester, as well as the networks surrounding Springfield and Pittsfield, in the mid-to-late 1900s. (Note: Within Massachusetts, the New England Investment and Securities Company also owned the Berkshire Street Railway, Springfield Street Railway, Milford, Attleborough and Woonsocket Street Railway, and Interstate Consolidated Street Railway systems.)

Despite the New Haven's maneuvering and attempts to conceal ownership of stock, the Massachusetts Supreme Court ruled in May 1908 that the New Haven had to fully divest from the streetcar systems by July 1909. The New Haven then attempted to use its substantial political power to simply legalize its ownership. A 1912 bill to consolidate its Massachusetts holdings into the Worcester, Springfield and Berkshire Street Railway (similar to its previous creations of the Connecticut Company and Rhode Island Company) as a holding company under the direct ownership of the New Haven was vetoed by governor Eugene Foss. In 1913, the railroad succeeded in pushing the Massachusetts legislature to override Foss's veto of a similar bill. (Note: That bill gave the Berkshire Street Railway the right to acquire the other companies; however, it did not actually do so.)

Four of the companies owned by the New England Investment and Securities Company were merged into the WCSR on May 3, 1911: the Worcester and Southbridge Street Railway, the Worcester and Blackstone Valley Street Railway, the Marlborough and Westborough Street Railway, and the Worcester and Holden Street Railway. This was the second of the system's two major consolidations. By 1912, the WCSR system had been formed from 17 formerly independent companies.

==== Worcester and Southbridge ====
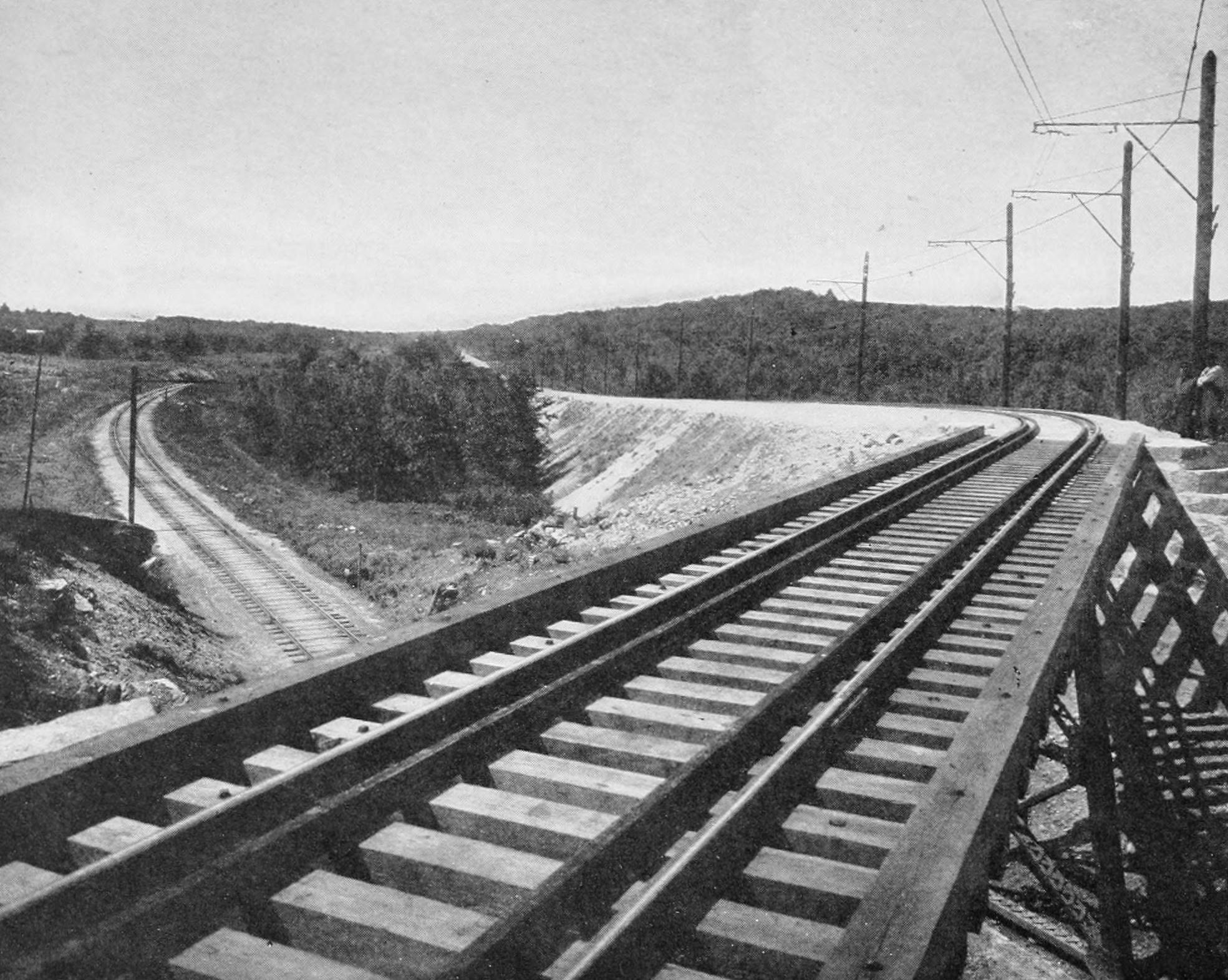
Trestle over the Webster Branch in Oxford

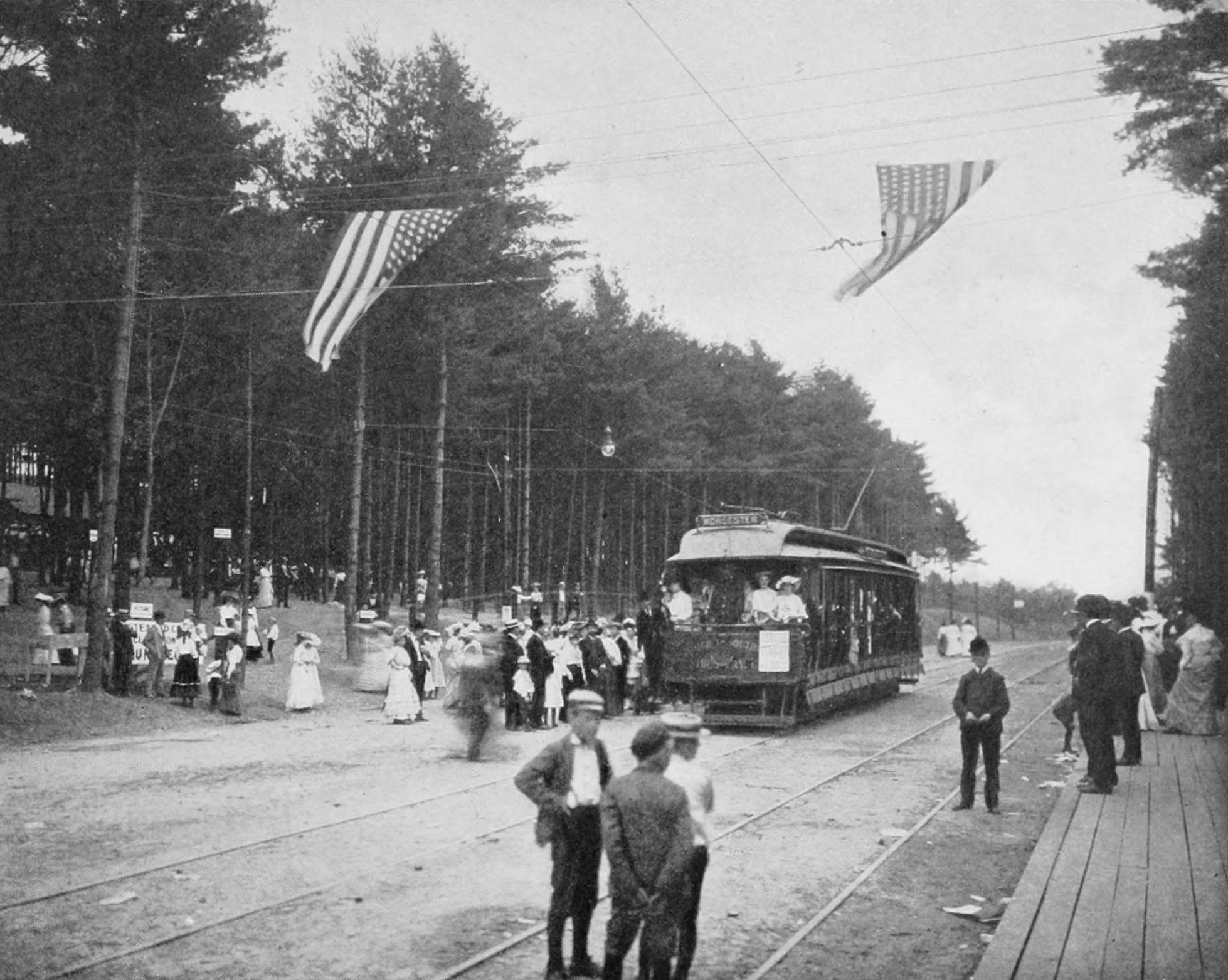
Streetcar at Pinehurst Park in 1903

The Southbridge and Sturbridge Street Railway was organized on February 18, 1896. It opened a 7.44-mile (11.97 km) line between Fiskdale and Sandersdale in its namesake municipalities on August 29, 1896. The Worcester and Southbridge Street Railway was organized on January 4, 1901, to build a line between its namesake cities. It was intended as part of a through route between Worcester and Hartford, Connecticut – which did not have a direct railroad line between them – that would also include the Southbridge and Sturbridge. The Worcester and Southbridge obtained control of the Southbridge and Sturbridge in 1901 and began operating it in January 1902.

The Worcester, Rochdale and Charlton Depot Street Railway was organized on July 12, 1901. It was intended to construct a line from Charlton Depot to Worcester through Rochdale, with a branch from Rochdale to Leicester. However, the only portion actually constructed was 1.52 miles (2.45 km) on Stafford, James, and South Ludlow Streets within Worcester. This served as part of the Worcester and Southbridge, which operated the line. The Worcester and Southbridge – including the Worcester, Rochdale and Charlton Depot – began service on July 21, 1902. The Worcester, Rochdale and Charlton Depot was originally single track and made two sharp turns in the Jamesville section of Worcester. It was straightened and double-tracked in 1903.

The Worcester and Southbridge was well built, with over half its length on private right-of-way. It ran southwest through Auburn, Oxford, and Charlton to Southbridge. A carhouse and powerhouse were located at Charlton City. With a top speed of 35 miles per hour (56 km/h), it was the fastest streetcar line in the state when it opened. The company interchanged freight with the Webster Branch of the Boston and Albany Railroad at Oxford Heights. An associated trolley park in Auburn, Pinehurst Park, opened in August 1902. The Overlook Hotel in Charlton, also connected to the line, opened in July 1903.

Despite these advantages, the Worcester and Southbridge went bankrupt in August 1903. It was placed into receivership along with the Worcester, Rochdale and Charlton Depot on August 29. A separate receiver for Pinehurst Park and the Overlook was appointed on September 2. The receivers soon found evidence of financial misdeeds by Wilford A. Bailey, treasurer of the Worcester and Southbridge. Bailey had used funds from the street railway to build the park and hotel and had forged the signatures of other company officials. (Note: The Worcester and Southbridge was not Bailey's last foray into financial crime. He was convicted of forging signatures in 1908, of perjury in 1910, and of obtaining money under false pretenses in 1920.) Bailey's unusually heavy spending on the line's construction and rolling stock was also blamed for the bankruptcy.

Claims against the bankrupt companies were settled at half value in early 1904. The New Haven purchased the Worcester and Southbridge; the Worcester, Rochdale and Charlton Depot; and the Southbridge and Sturbridge in May 1904. Pinehurst Park and the Overlook Hotel were sold to a group of investors. (Note: Pinehurst Park remained in use until the early 1910s. The Overlook Hotel was closed in October 1904 due to unprofitability. It was sold to the Grand Lodge of Massachusetts in December 1908 for conversion to a retirement home; that facility opened in May 1911.) The two smaller lines were merged into the Worcester and Southbridge on January 9, 1905. In December 1911, after consolidation with the WCSR, the New Haven built a spur track in western Southbridge to allow interchange with its Southbridge Branch. (Note: Such a connection had been planned since 1903.)

The Hartford and Worcester Street Railway was organized on March 5, 1903. By April 1905, it was controlled by the same interests as the Boston and Worcester Street Railway. They intended it to be the Massachusetts portion of an 'air line' following a nearly-direct course between Hartford, Connecticut, and Worcester, with a branch from East Brimfield to Springfield. Boston–Springfield and Boston–Hartford through services were planned at about half the fare of the steam railroads. Within several months, the New Haven-controlled Springfield and Eastern Street Railway sought permission to extend east from Monson to Fiskdale to connect with the Worcester and Southbridge. (Note: The Worcester and Southbridge itself had surveyed an extension to Springfield via Brimfield in 1902.) The two companies sparred over the rights to construct their respective lines in Brimfield.

In January 1906, the New Haven purchased the Hartford and Worcester plus its planned Connecticut connections from the Boston and Worcester interests. (Note: The Connecticut lines were the Hartford, Manchester and Rockville Tramway and the not-yet-built Stafford Springs Street Railway. They became part of the Connecticut Company, which completed the line as far north as Stafford Springs, Connecticut in 1908. The Brimfield–Stafford Springs gap was never filled.) With a purchase price of $134,000 (equivalent to $3.3 million in 2024) for little more than the rights to build the line, this represented a substantial profit for the sellers. The Springfield and Eastern built east from Palmer, and the Hartford and Worcester west from Fiskdale, meeting at the Stubridge/Brimfield town line near East Brimfield. The latter portion, less than 2 miles (3.2 km) long, cost $160,000 (equivalent to $3.9 million in 2024) to build. The extensions opened on July 5, 1907, inaugurating Springfield–Worcester through service. The Hartford and Worcester was operated by the Worcester and Southbridge. It was transferred to the Worcester and Southbridge for $140,000 (equivalent to $3.4 million in 2024) and merged with it on May 6, 1910.

==== Worcester and Blackstone Valley ====
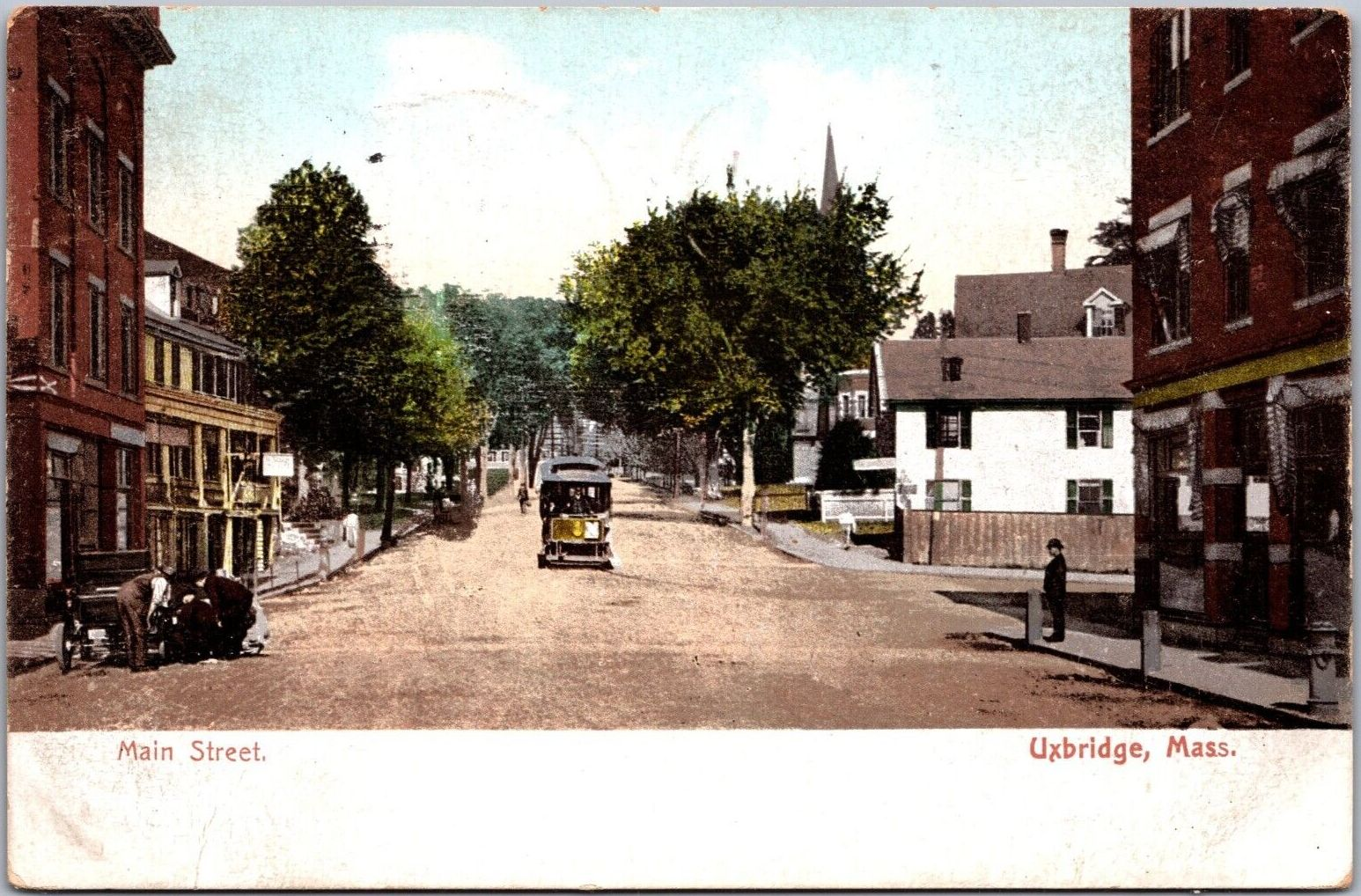
A streetcar in downtown Uxbridge

The Blackstone Valley Street Railway was organized in 1893 to build a line between Millbury and Northbridge. Partially complete and not yet opened, it entered receivership in late 1896. The Worcester and Blackstone Valley Street Railway was chartered on June 9, 1897, to take over its property and franchise. It opened a 5.15-mile (8.29 km) line between Millbury and the Farnumsville portion of Grafton on August 14, 1897. The Worcester and Suburban began operating the line in February 1898. An extension to the Rockdale village of Northbridge over Providence Road opened on April 11, 1898. Service operated between Worcester and Rockdale.

The company became independent again in October 1900, with service no longer running through to Worcester. An extension to Whitinsville via Plummers Corner (Church Street at Providence Road) opened on December 12, 1900. The company built its own route from Millbury to Worcester via Canal Street, Howe Avenue, and Millbury Avenue, meeting the WCSR Grafton line at Rice Square. It shared tracks with the Worcester and Suburban on a short stretch of Main Street in Millbury. Worcester–Whitinsville service over the new line began on October 26, 1901, using the WCSR to reach downtown Worcester from Rice Square. The New Haven acquired the Worcester and Blackstone Valley in September 1904.

The Woonsocket Street Railway opened a horsecar line from Woonsocket, Rhode Island, to Blackstone, Massachusetts, around 1887. It was electrified from Woonsocket to the state line on September 23, 1893, and to Blackstone afterwards. A short extension to the west side of Blackstone was opened around 1898. The company built a longer extension to Millville around 1900 for a total length of 3.12 miles (5.02 km) inside Massachusetts. The Consolidated acquired the Woonsocket Street Railway and three adjoining lines in November 1906; it later became part of the Rhode Island Company. The Millville–state line trackage was operated as part of the Worcester system by September 1907. The Worcester and Blackstone Valley purchased it from the Rhode Island Company in October 1910.

The Uxbridge and Blackstone Street Railway was organized on July 25, 1901. Its 7.33-mile (11.80 km) line between Linwood and Millville via Uxbridge opened on September 1, 1902. In July 1903, the line was extended slightly north from the Northbridge town line at Linwood to the New Haven's Whitins station. An extension to Plummers Corner opened in June 1905. The NEISCo acquired the Uxbridge and Blackstone in June 1907. Through service between Woonsocket and Worcester began later that year when a track connection at Plummers Corner was completed. The Uxbridge and Blackstone was merged into the Worcester and Blackstone Valley on December 31, 1909.

==== Marlborough and Westborough ====
The Marlborough and Westborough Street Railway was chartered on May 25, 1896, but did not begin construction until 1900. Its route ran northeast from Westborough to Marlborough via western Southborough on a combination of rural highways and private right-of-way. The Westborough and Worcester Street Railway was chartered on May 29, 1900. Construction began soon afterward on its route between North Grafton and Westborough via Westboro Road, Nourse Street, and West Main Street. The two companies, which had nearly identical boards of directors, merged on April 16, 1901, under the Marlborough and Westborough name. The North Grafton–Westborough segment of the combined company opened later in April, followed by the Westborough–Marlborough segment on May 1. In February 1906, the company was acquired by the Worcester Railway and Investment Company. It reinstituted through service between Worcester and Marlborough, which had been previously run by the Marlborough and Westborough but discontinued in 1905.

==== Worcester and Holden ====
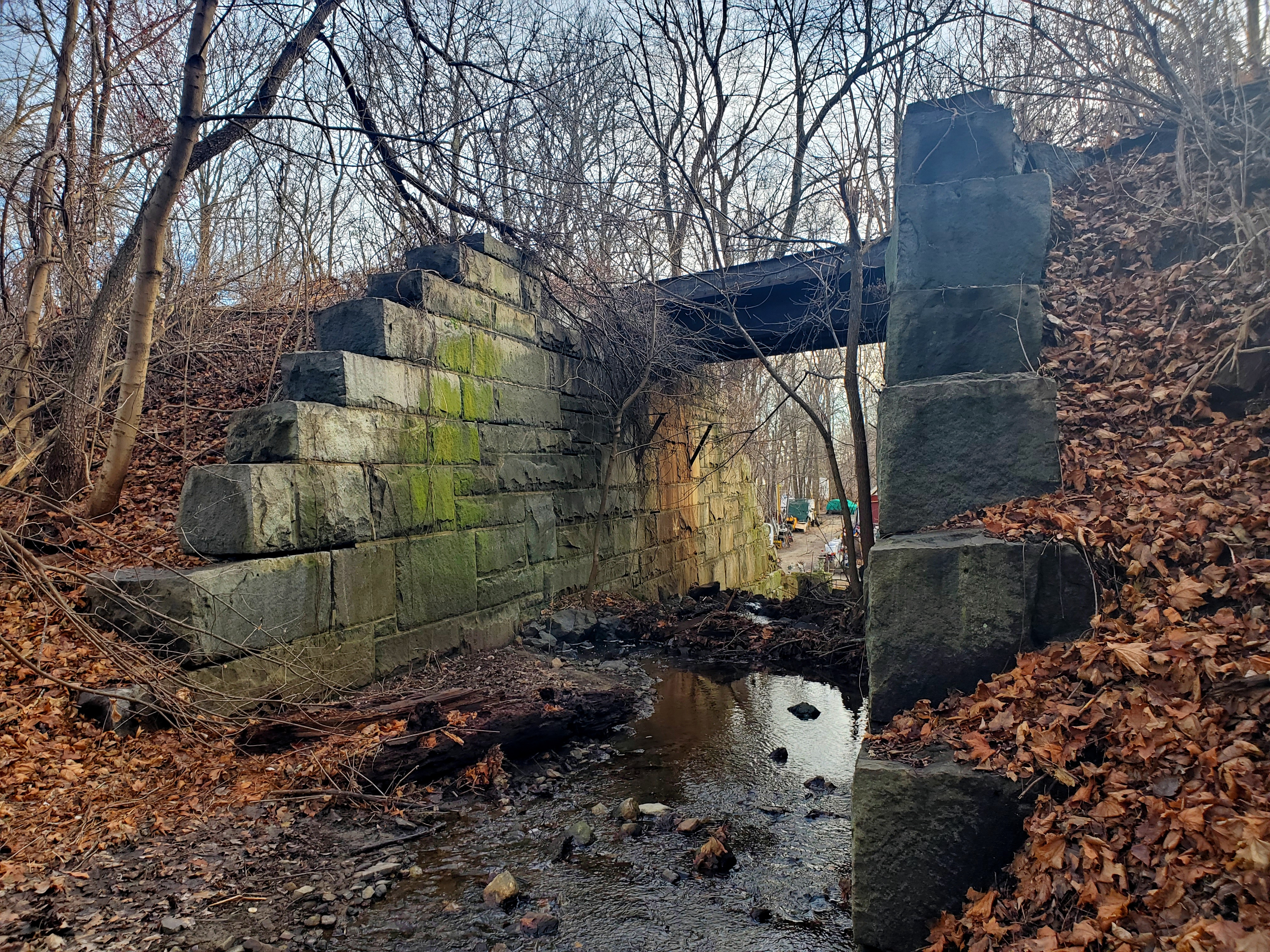
Underpass that carried the Worcester and Holden under the Gardner Branch

The Worcester and Holden Street Railway was chartered on July 10, 1902, and construction began the next month. It opened a 7-mile (11 km) line between Eagle Lake in Holden and Chadwick Square in Worcester on June 21, 1903. It followed Main Street through much of Holden, with a section of private right-of-way around a hill. The line continued into Worcester on Shrewsbury Street, Holden Street, and Grove Street; at North Worcester, it passed under the Gardner Branch on a short section of private right-of-way. Its cars used WCSR tracks between Chadwick Square and downtown Worcester. A 0.4-mile (0.64 km) extension northwest to Jefferson opened in December 1903, and a second extension of the same length to Jefferson station on the Central Massachusetts Railroad opened a year later. A further extension to Mount Wachusett – where it would have met the Gardner, Westminster and Fitchburg Street Railway – was planned. (Note: The Worcester and Northern Street Railway was organized in late 1902 by many of the same stockholders to build the extension. It was also to build a line to the summit similar to the Mount Tom Railroad. The company received several extensions of its franchise deadline and was active until at least 1912, but it never constructed the line.) The Worcester and Holden was acquired by the WRIC on January 1, 1908.

==== Webster and Dudley ====
The Webster and Dudley Street Railway was organized on March 23, 1898. Four lines radiating from downtown Webster were planned: to Perryville via School Street, to East Village (East Webster) and the town cemetery via South Main Street and East Main Street, to Thompson Road via Lake Street, and a branch of the East Village line via Slater Street to North Village. (Note: Despite its name, the Webster and Dudley never built into the adjoining town of Dudley.) The Lake Street line opened on June 15, 1898. It served the nearby Beacon Park on the shore of Lake Chaubunagungamaug. The East Village and Perryville lines opened the next month. Service on the East Webster line was operated only intermittently until September 1898. It was only operated as far as the crossing of the Southbridge Branch until October 1898, when a diamond crossing was installed. The 3,000-foot (910 m) branch on Slater Street opened late in December 1898.

The Worcester and Webster Street Railway was chartered on October 1, 1898. Construction began later that month. It ran north from the end of the East Webster line, passing through Oxford and Auburn and reaching the Worcester line on Hampton Street. Local controversy ensued over which route to use in Worcester: via Malvern Road and Southbridge Street to a connection with the WCSR at Stearns Square; or via a private right-of-way, Clay Street, and College Street to Stearns Square. The latter route was ultimately chosen; service began on October 21, 1899. The company had not received permission to cross the Norwich Branch at Dunn's Crossing in Auburn, so passengers had to walk across the tracks there to change cars, and the track connection with the WCSR at Stearns Square was not complete. The Stearns Square connection opened on April 1, 1900, allowing cars to run to Worcester City Hall. The Dunn's Crossing bridge was completed later in 1900.

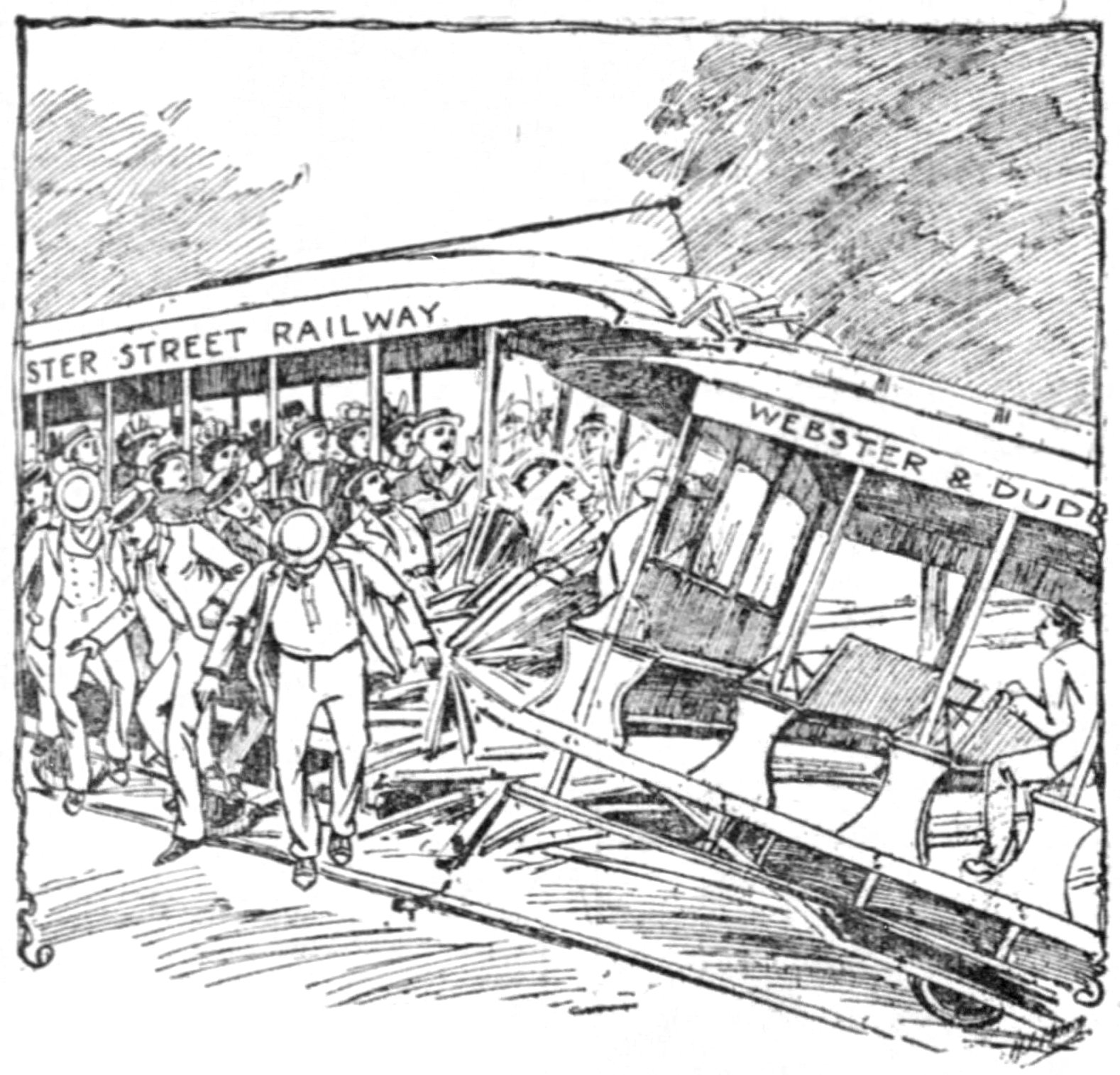
Drawing of the July 1900 collision

On July 4, 1900, a Webster and Dudley streetcar collided with a Worcester and Webster streetcar on East Main Street, killing two passengers and injuring dozens of others. Later that month, the Webster and Dudley withdrew its service from the East Webster line, with the Worcester and Webster continuing to serve the line. On October 1, 1900, the Webster and Dudley's permission to cross the New Haven's tracks on East Main Street expired. The Worcester and Webster operated as far south as the crossing, with Webster and Dudley cars operating between there and downtown Webster. Within a week, Worcester and Webster service was cut back to the town cemetery, with a Webster and Dudley car running between there and the crossing. The Webster and Dudley built a short bypass over private land and Park Avenue, which already had a bridge over the Southbridge Branch. The bypass opened in December 1900.

The New Haven-controlled People's Tramway obtained majority stock control of the Worcester and Webster in January 1901, shortly after acquiring control of the Webster and Dudley. On July 1, 1901, Worcester and Webster cars resumed operating into downtown Webster. The Webster and Dudley opened an extension of the Lake Street line into Beacon Park in August 1901. It followed Thompson Road north a short distance and crossed over the Southbridge Branch to enter the park. Construction of a connecting line from near Perryville to North Grosvenordale, Connecticut began in August 1901. It opened on January 29, 1902.

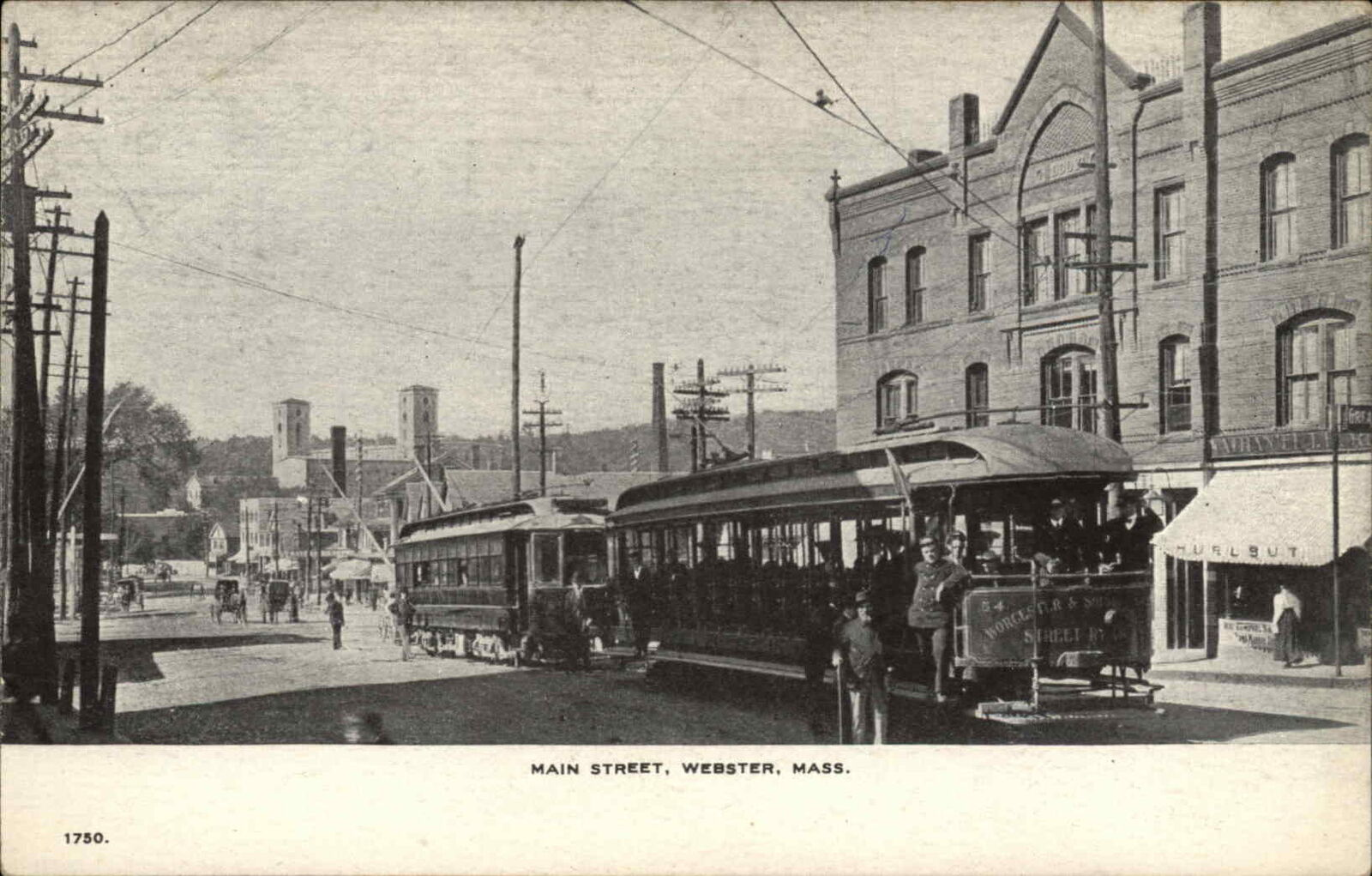
Postcard of streetcars in Webster around 1907. The near streetcar is from the Worcester and Southbridge, as rolling stock was often exchanged between New Haven subsidiaries.

The Webster and Dudley obtained Massachusetts legislative permission in August 1901 to lease other street railways. In November 1901, the New Haven-controlled majority shares voted to lease the Worcester and Webster to the Webster and Dudley, but the minority stockholders attempted to prevent the lease. The minority stockholders sold their shares to New Haven interests in March 1902, allowing the lease to begin on July 1, 1902. On September 29, 1902, the Webster and Dudley was in turn leased to the Worcester and Connecticut Eastern Railroad (W&CE), a New Haven-controlled holding company. The People's Tramway was merged into the W&CE at the same time.

Passengers originally had to transfer between streetcars at North Grosvenordale. On October 1, 1903, the W&CE began through service between Central Village, Connecticut, and Webster. The W&CE was renamed as the Consolidated Railway in May 1904. The New Haven's various streetcar holdings in Connecticut were merged with the company, but the Massachusetts lines were not. In June 1905, the Worcester and Webster opened a 1,400-foot (430 m) connector at Oxford Heights. It crossed over the Webster Branch and connected with the Worcester and Southbridge. The Consolidated Railway lease of the Webster and Dudley was transferred to the Worcester and Southbridge on April 1, 1907.

On May 31, 1907, the Consolidated Railway was merged with the New Haven. On February 28, 1910, the New Haven sublet its Connecticut streetcar properties to the Connecticut Company to nominally separate ownership. The New Haven retained direct ownership of the line between West Thompson and the state line, as well as segments of the two other out-of-state systems within Connecticut. On March 1, 1910, Webster and Dudley crews began operating the service as far south as West Thompson, Connecticut, where Connecticut Company crews took over. This was due to a Massachusetts law prohibiting out-of-state companies from operating in the state. The leases of the Webster and Dudley and of the Worcester and Webster were assumed by the WCSR in 1911 when the Worcester and Southbridge was merged with it. (Note: The Webster and Dudley and the Worcester and Webster were never merged with the WCSR; the leases ended in 1929 after service was abandoned, and they were dissolved in 1930.)

In July 1913, the Shore Line Electric Railway leased the Connecticut Company's Eastern Connecticut lines. The New Haven retained control of the West Thompson–state line portion; by mid-1914, passengers had to transfer at West Thompson. Shore Line crews struck for higher wages in July 1919. When the Shore Line resumed Central Village–West Thompson service in late August using strikebreakers, the unionized WCSR crews refused to run cars south of Grosvenordale, to avoid making connections with the non-union crews. On September 15, 1919, Shore Line cars began operating as far as the state line, meeting WCSR cars there. All service between Central Village and the state line ended on February 4, 1920, due to a heavy snowstorm. The line reopened in the spring, but only as far north as North Grosvenordale. The lines leased in July 1913 reverted to the Connecticut Company on April 1, 1920. Not until January 1922 did the WCSR resume running south to North Grosvenordale.

==== Final extensions ====
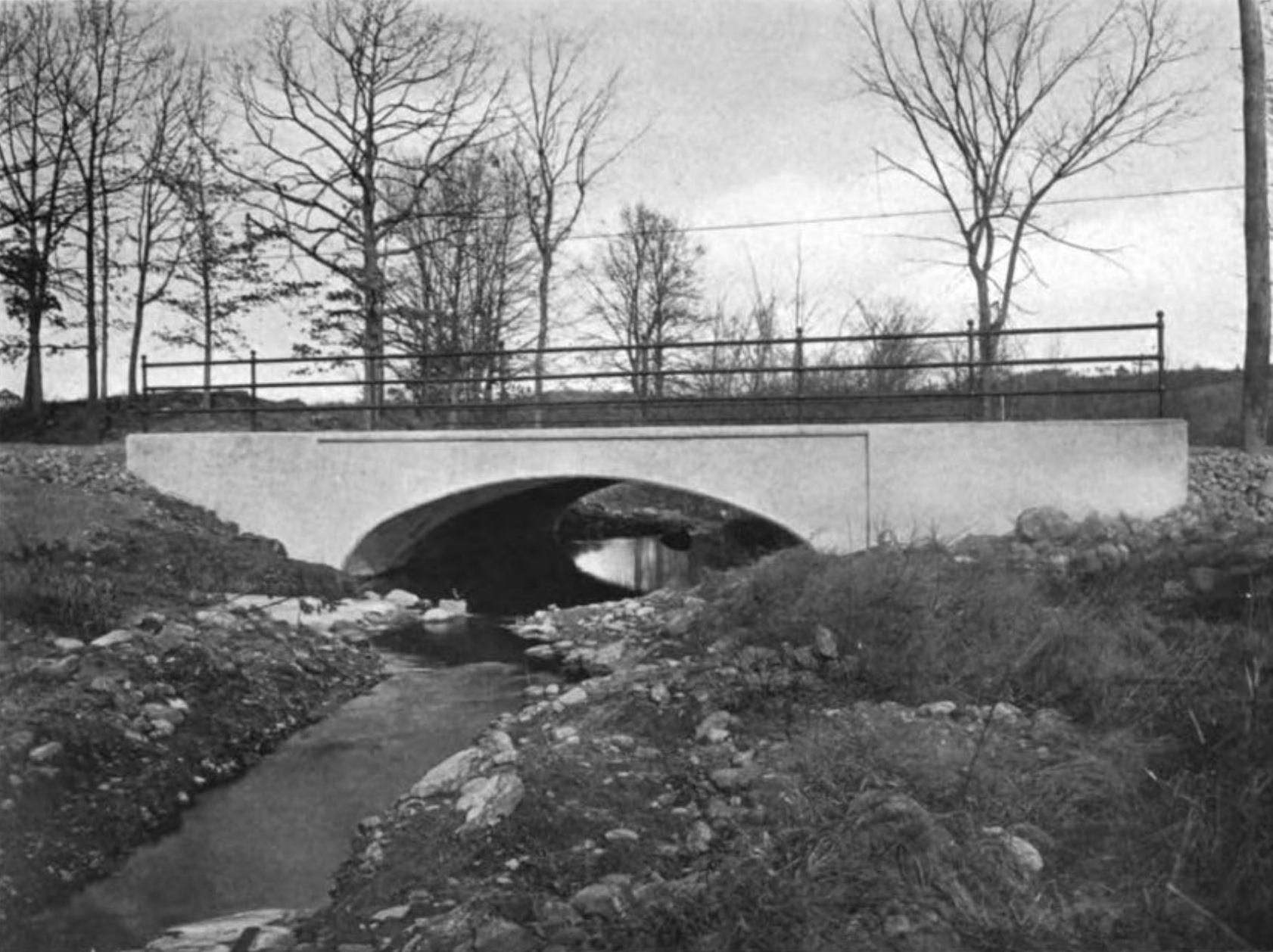
Bridge for the 1913 West Tatnuck extension

The most significant expansion of the WCSR itself under New Haven ownership was a new 'air line' route between Worcester and Leominster. From the north end of the Greendale line it followed what is now Route 12 north through West Boylston and Sterling. With about 10 miles (16 km) of private right-of-way, it was one hour faster between the two cities than the older route via Clinton. Construction began in June 1905. The line opened between Leominster and Sterling on May 27, 1906; within a week, cars were running as far as Lake Washacum in southern Sterling. The rest of the line was delayed by construction of a bridge over the Worcester Branch at Sterling Junction. Worcester–Leominster through service did not begin until December 18, 1906.

Late in 1906, the Bell Hill line was extended north about 1,400 feet (430 m) on Channing Street. The intercity streetcar network in Massachusetts was largely complete by 1907, and no further rural lines were built by the WCSR or the companies it acquired. However, several extensions to the outskirts of Worcester were completed in the 1910s, along with double-tracking of some existing lines. Around May 1910, the Hamilton Street line was extended east to Lake Park. A line on Burncoat Street north from Randolph Road opened in December 1911. The Providence Street line was extended by 3,605 feet (1,099 m) along Holcombe Street and Granite Street in September 1912. The Tatnuck line was extended by 4,668 feet (1,423 m) to West Tatnuck in August 1913. The company's final extension was on the Quinsigamond Village line, with 0.9 miles (1.4 km) of track to the Millbury town line added around September 1917.

=== Decline ===
The fortunes of the WCSR were typical for street railway companies in Massachusetts. The suburban lines were never financially successful; they were subsidized by the city lines. After paying an 8% dividend from 1895 to 1900, the WCSR never again paid a dividend above 6% after merging with the suburban lines in 1901. Even by Mellen's resignation in 1913, the New Haven's aggressive acquisition of streetcar companies proved a poor financial choice. Despite the New Haven's early optimistic predictions, the street railway industry began a steep decline in the late 1910s. Operating costs in Massachusetts more than doubled from 1913 to 1920, while the number of automobiles in the state quintupled. Competition from jitneys became a serious threat in 1915. The Worcester Railways and Investment Corporation was dissolved in 1917, with the WCSR thereafter controlled directly by the NEISCo.

==== Rural line abandonments ====
The WCSR cut almost all of its suburban and rural lines between 1924 and 1930. The first significant cuts (Note: Several minor cuts had occurred earlier: tracks on Sever Street were removed in 1900, and on Water Street around 1902.) were in July 1924: between Auburn and Oxford Heights, and between Westborough and Marlborough. The former did not result in a major loss of service, however, as Worcester–Webster service was rerouted over the 1905-built connector at Oxford Heights. The Grafton–Westborough, Grafton–North Grafton, and Clinton–Hudson lines and the Leicester–Spencer portion of the Spencer line were all closed on September 6, 1924. Other private companies began operating replacement bus service on the discontinued routes.

The entire system was converted to one-man operation to save on labor cost, with the final routes converted on September 7, 1924. The Northboro–Westboro line was closed by snow on January 18, 1925, and never reopened. That year, the company began buying buses to replace streetcars on unprofitable lines. The Spencer line reopened in May 1925 but closed permanently that September. The line to Auburn was abandoned on August 22, 1925, due to competition from a bus company. The Shrewsbury–Marlborough section of the Marlborough line was replaced with buses on September 20, 1925. The Clinton–Leominster line was closed on October 4, 1925. The WCSR also expanded into territory not previously served by streetcars both by expanding its own bus routes and buying other bus companies.

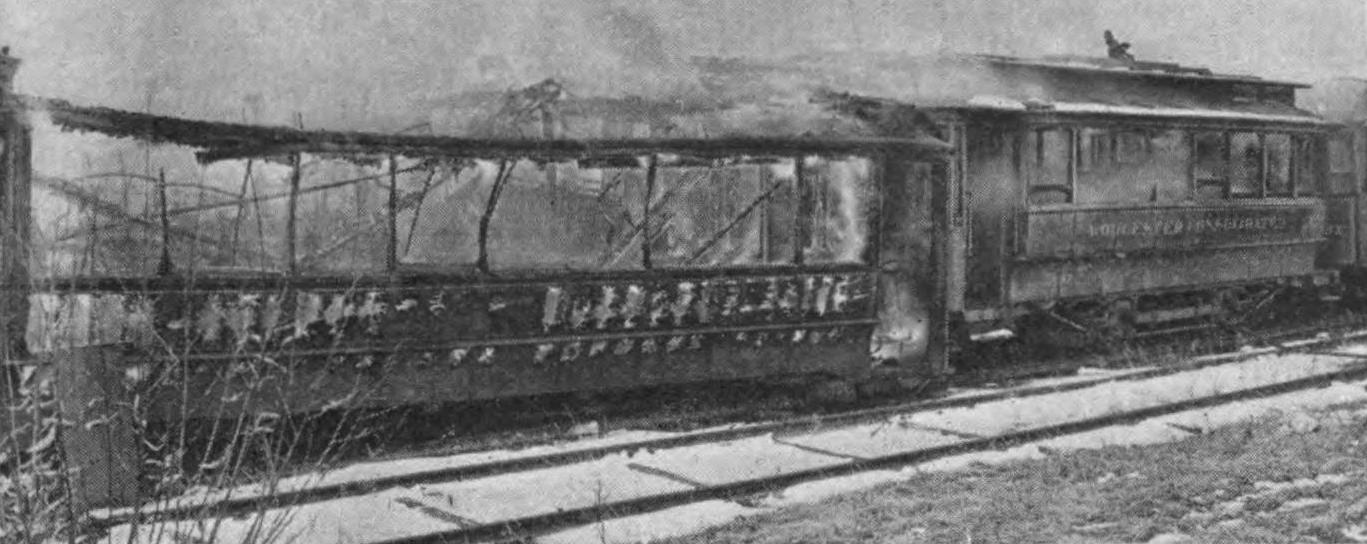
Older streetcars being burned in 1928

In May 1926, the state legislature permitted the New Haven to resume direct ownership of the Worcester and Springfield systems and rehabilitate them. The act required three-quarters of municipalities served by the systems to approve the plans. The approvals were secured in late 1926 and the New Haven took ownership in early 1927. Under the New Haven's program, the company ordered 50 new streetcars in 1927. This allowed older and obsolete streetcars to be retired; in 1928, the WCSR disposed of 375 cars by burning them or selling them for scrap. The existing streetcars that were retained for service were retrofitted with route number signs. By 1930, the New Haven had spent $2.48 million (equivalent to $48 million in 2025) rehabilitating the WCSR system.

The New Haven's work focused on the city lines; the longest rural and intercity lines were all abandoned in 1927. Service to Clinton ended on February 7, 1927. The Worcester–Leominster, Leominster crosstown, and Leominster–Fitchburg lines were terminated on April 23, 1927, though the Fitchburg and Leominster Street Railway took over the latter line for at least a month. (Note: Service was retained as far north as Summit, near the Worcester/West Boylston border.) Freight and express service was ended across the network at that time; a trucking company took over the business the following week. Remaining service to the Blackstone Valley ended on May 22, 1927, and to Webster on June 1, 1927. Worcester–Southbridge service and Worcester–Springfield through service were replaced with buses on August 14, 1927; streetcars continued local service in Southbridge for around a month longer. (Note: The WCSR began supplementing streetcars with buses in Southbridge in 1925. The company had threatened at that time to withdraw all streetcar service from the town unless its bus permit was approved.) In 1931, the Standard Oil Company purchased the Palmer–Southbridge–Worcester right-of-way for construction of a gasoline pipeline.

==== City line abandonments ====
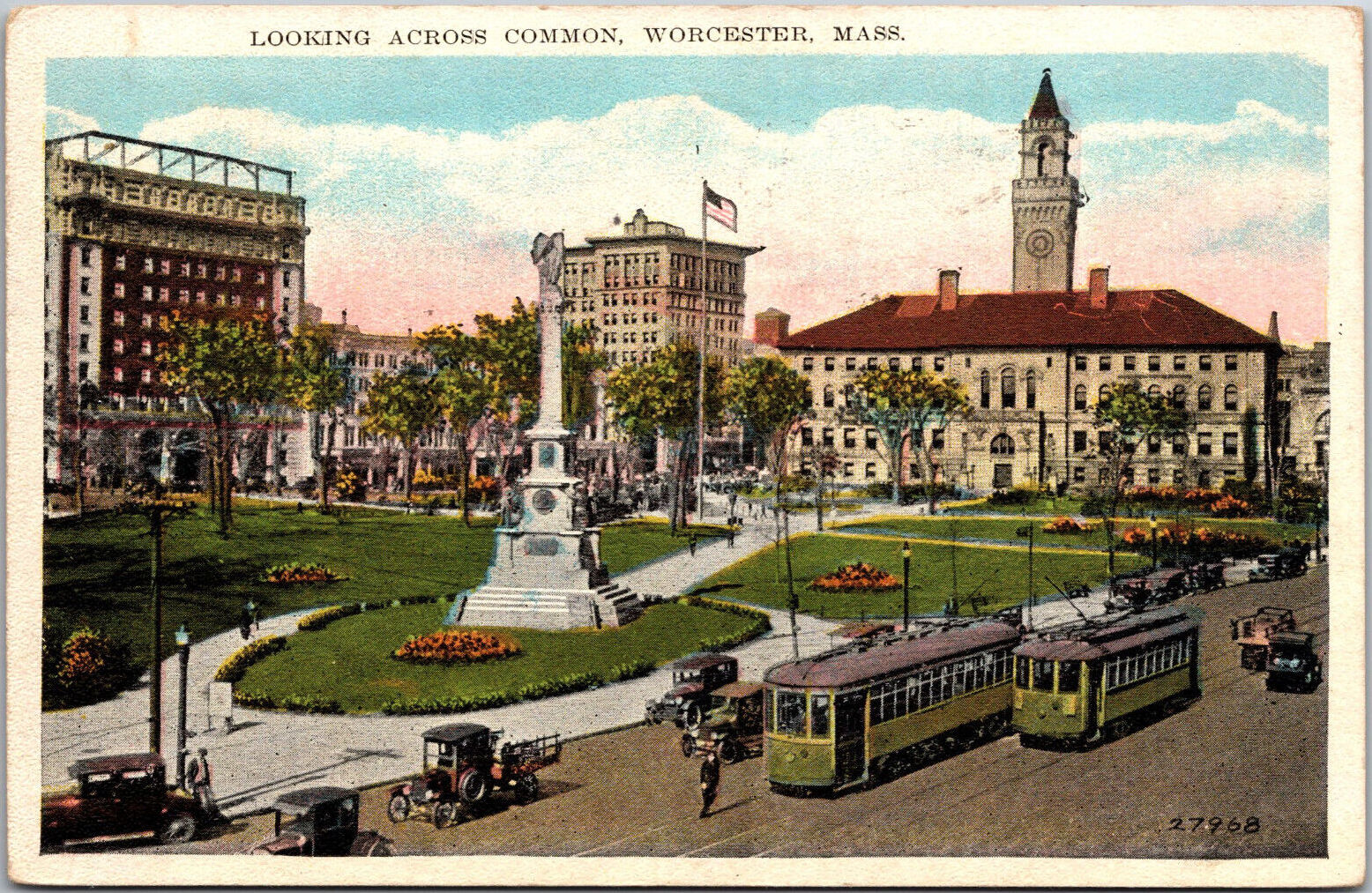
1929 postcard of streetcars and City Hall

The beginning of the Great Depression worsened the company's financial issues. In September 1930, the operators union accepted a reduced work week to avoid layoffs. The entire funded debt of the WCSR – $5.33 million (equivalent to $103 million in 2025) in bonds – became due on August 1, 1930. The New Haven declined to pay the bonds, nearly sending the company into foreclosure in November 1930. The bondholders agreed to receivership instead of foreclosure; a receiver was appointed on December 31, 1930. The Boston and Worcester Street Railway ceased using WCSR trackage on January 15, 1931, when it converted to buses west of Framingham. In August 1931, the bondholders foreclosed on the WCSR. The North Grafton line closed on September 12, 1931, along with the Elm Park and Franklin Street city lines. The Jefferson, Shrewsbury, and Millbury lines were all also given up by that time. This left just the city lines remaining – only the short routes to Cherry Valley and West Auburn still crossed the Worcester city boundaries.

A reorganization plan was announced in April 1932. On May 11, 1932, the WCSR was sold for $1.5 million (equivalent to $32 million in 2025) to the bondholder's committee, which was the only bidder. The next month, it was reorganized as the Worcester Street Railway. A holding company, the Worcester Transportation Associates, was also formed. By August 1932, the company operated about 100 streetcars and 60 buses. The new owners intended to replace all of the streetcar lines with buses. Many were converted over the next five years, beginning with the Lake View line in 1933. The Southbridge Street and Canterbury Street lines were closed on November 10, 1934. The West Auburn line – the remaining portion of the Springfield line – was converted in September 1935. The Laurel Hill line was converted in April 1936, followed by the Salisbury Street and Boynton Street lines on June 3. The Randolph Road and Burncoat Street lines via Lincoln Street also ended that year.

In April 1937, the New England Gas and Electric Association obtained stock control of the Worcester Transportation Associates. The Summit Line was converted to buses on July 17, 1937, allowing a road bridge carrying West Boylston Street to replace the grade crossing at Barbers. The two lines using Green Street were converted in 1938: streetcar service on ended the Upsala Street line on September 22 due to damage from the 1938 New England hurricane, while the Quinsigamond (Millbury Line) line lasted until October 29. The West Tatnuck–Tatnuck portion of route 2 was converted to buses in 1939. This left the system just 31.4 miles (50.5 km) of track and 60 streetcars serving five routes: 1 June and Providence Streets, 2 Tatnuck and Hamilton Street, 19 Wheaton Square – Leicester Line – Cherry Valley (the remaining part of the Spencer line), 21 Hadwen Park – City Hall – Thomas Street, and 24 Columbus Park/Coe Square – Belmont Street/Green Hill Park. Twenty-five bus routes were operated with a fleet of 155 buses.

==== War years and final conversions ====
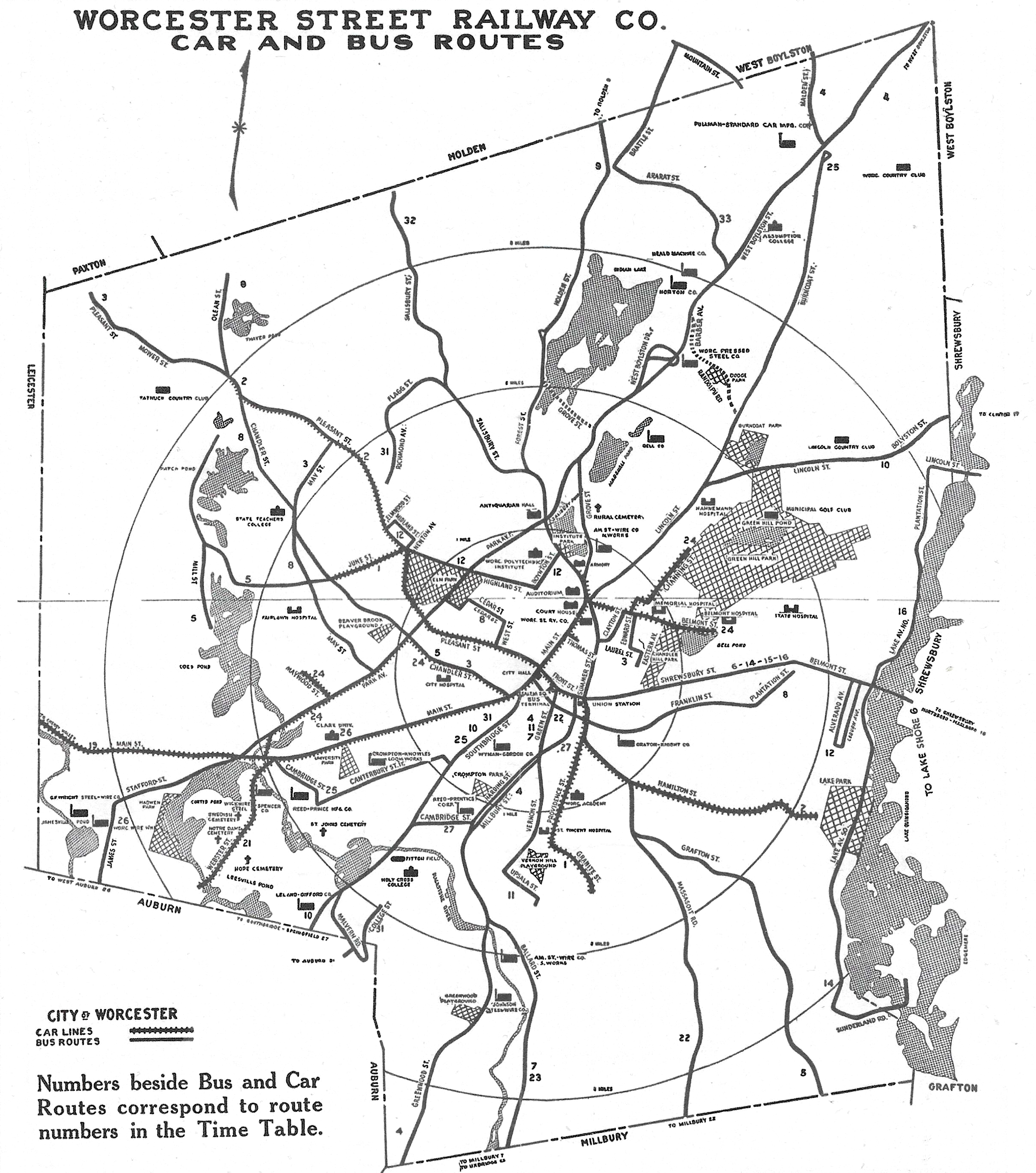
January 1945 map showing bus routes and the final five streetcar lines

In January 1941, the Massachusetts Department of Public Utilities (DPU) approved the conversion of all remaining streetcar routes to buses. However, no routes were converted that year due to a shortage of buses. Worcester businessman Edmund H. Taylor, who already owned several smaller bus systems in Massachusetts and Connecticut, purchased control of the Worcester Transportation Associates for $1.35 million (equivalent to $30 million in 2025) in November 1941. He intended to convert the remaining streetcar lines to buses during 1942.

Rationing of rubber tires and gasoline began after the United States entered World War II in December 1941. Vehicle production was switched to military vehicles; in March 1942, the Office of Defense Transportation (ODT) prohibited operators from converting streetcar lines to buses. Ridership increased during the war years, with over 50 million annual passengers, temporarily returning the Worcester Street Railway to profitability. In 1942, the ODT allocated 41 new buses to the company to handle the needs of war industry workers. An additional short turn service on the busiest section of the Main Street route – between the Main Street carhouse and Webster Square – operated in parts of 1943 and 1944 to handle riders transferring from the Auburn bus line.

With the end of the war in August 1945 came the end of the prohibition on bus conversions. In September 1945, the Worcester Street Railway ordered 50 new buses to replace the final 50 streetcars in operation. The western portions of routes 1 and 2 were replaced with buses on November 3, 1945. Their eastern portions plus routes 19, 21, and 24 were replaced after the end of service on December 30, 1945, ending streetcar usage in Worcester. The final trip – an inbound car from the Leicester Line cutback of route 19 – arrived in the early morning hours of December 31.

The new buses had lower capacity than the streetcars they replaced, leading to overcrowding. Passenger complaints led to a state investigation in January 1946. On February 6, 1946, the DPU ordered the Worcester Street Railway to restore streetcar service on February 11 until a sufficient number of buses were in operation. The company had no interest in operating streetcars again. Instead, it purchased enough older buses from United Electric Railways of Providence, Rhode Island to reach the required number. The DPU formally authorized the discontinuance of streetcar service in April 1946. The streetcar fleet was sold off to a broker in New York City: 10 cars in October 1945 and 50 cars in April 1946. They were resold to Brazilian cities: 35 to Salvador, Bahia, and 25 to Porto Alegre. They remained in use in Salvador until September 1961 and Porto Alegre until March 1970.

=== Transition to public ownership ===
By 1948, the Worcester Street Railway carried 38 million annual passengers (110,000 daily riders) over 222 route miles with 237 buses. Seven hundred bus drivers, mechanics, and clerks struck for 15 days in July 1948. As with other bus companies, increasing postwar automobile ownership cut sharply into ridership. (Note: In the city of Worcester alone, auto ownership increased from 46,000 in 1950 to 70,000 in 1952.) In May 1951, with four continuous years of losses, the company filed with the DPU to go under partial public control. The petition was under a 1918 law – not used up to that point – similar to the law that brought the Boston Elevated Railway under public control. In March 1952, the company cut off-peak service on 22 of its 33 routes, claiming that "people are not going out nights, Sundays or holidays because of television."

Another strike over wages and pensions was narrowly avoided in July 1952. The raise eventually given to the drivers added $110,000 in annual operating costs (equivalent to $1.3 million in 2025). On July 15, shareholders proposed to liquidate the company unless a buyer or government subsidy could be found. The owners advertised the company for sale at the end of July 1952. Another strike was averted that October with an additional raise. By that time, ridership had dropped to 22 million annually (75,000 daily). That month, the city began studying whether to set up a public transit authority to replace the private system – a plan supported by both the company and the union. Service was discontinued on several routes in anticipation of liquidation at the end of the year, as a buyer had not been found.

In December 1952, a Boston financial group purchased the company for around $1.5 million (equivalent to $18 million in 2025). This placed it under common management with the Middlesex and Boston Street Railway. The company was renamed Worcester Bus Company on January 1, 1953. The new management replaced the 173 gasoline buses with cheaper-to-operate diesel buses over the following decade. Ridership that year was 19 million – half that of 1948 – over 231 route miles. Ridership continued to decline in 1954, though the company showed a small profit due to charter services. The Worcester Bus Company purchased an interstate charter license in 1958, allowing it to operate profitable charter services outside Massachusetts. Drivers and mechanics struck for 24 days in September 1966.

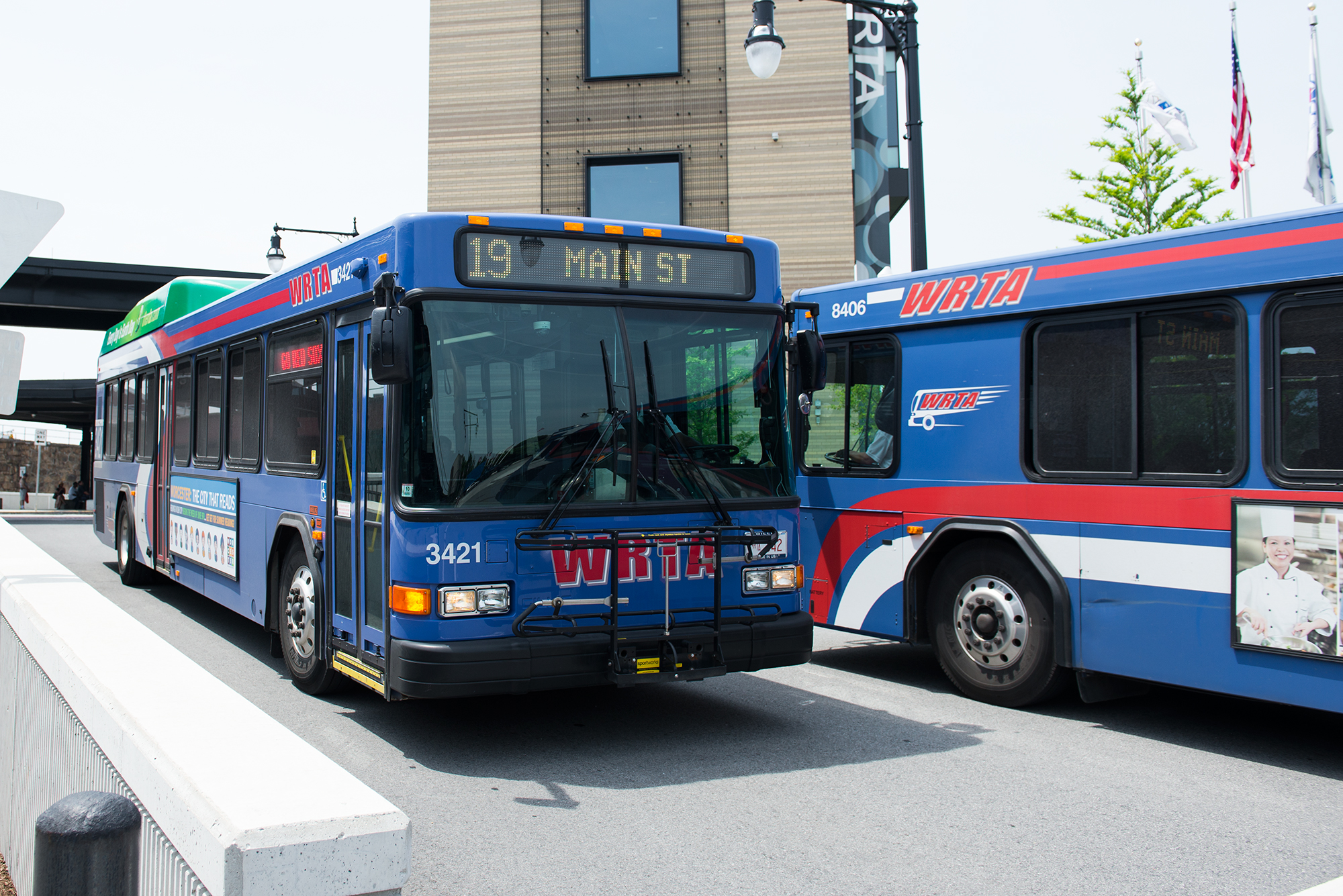
Modern buses of the WRTA

In April 1971, the city received a $597,057 federal grant (equivalent to $4.7 million in 2025) to purchase 34 new buses for the company to use. Only a last-minute increase in school charter rates prevented the company from ceasing operations that July. Shutting down was again threatened in August 1973. The company received a one-year, $300,000 state subsidy (equivalent to $2 million in 2025) as part of legislation in November 1973 that also established regional transit authorities. Daily ridership had dropped to 20,000 by July 1975, when a two-month strike again nearly collapsed the company. The company lost the Worcester Public Schools bus contract, which it had held for decades, in 1977. The 1974-formed Worcester Regional Transit Authority (WRTA) began subsidizing bus service in the mid-1970s and purchased the company's assets in 1978. On June 30, 1978, the WRTA contract switched to a different company to run the system; with no more operating contracts, the Worcester Bus Company was closed.

==== Remains ====
Surviving WCSR structures include the former power stations in Millbury and Worcester. Former powerhouses in Northborough, Oxford, and Berlin are also extant. Former substations survive in Sturbridge and Webster, as well as carhouses in Webster and Berlin. Two WCSR waiting rooms are extant in Charlton; one is on the grounds of a housing complex that includes the former Overlook Hotel that was owned by the WCSR. Another former waiting station is now a house in Westborough. A portion of the former Springfield line in Sturbridge has been converted to a rail trail.

None of the three major Worcester carhouses survive. The Gates Lane carhouse was demolished by 1936; the city purchased the site in 1943 to build a park (Bennett Field). The Market Street carhouse was sold in 1946 for factory use and demolished around 1980 during an urban renewal project. The Grove Street carhouse and bus garage were used by the WRTA until 2016 and demolished the following year. The former Westborough carhouse, long used by a machining company, was demolished in 2018.

No former WCSR streetcars are known to survive in North America. However, two of the 1927-built streetcars sold to Porto Allegre were used by the civil police for storage after service ended. In September 2020, they were moved to the Museu de Arte Contemporânea do Rio Grande do Sul (Museum of Contemporary Art of Rio Grande do Sul) in the Floresta neighborhood for preservation and display.

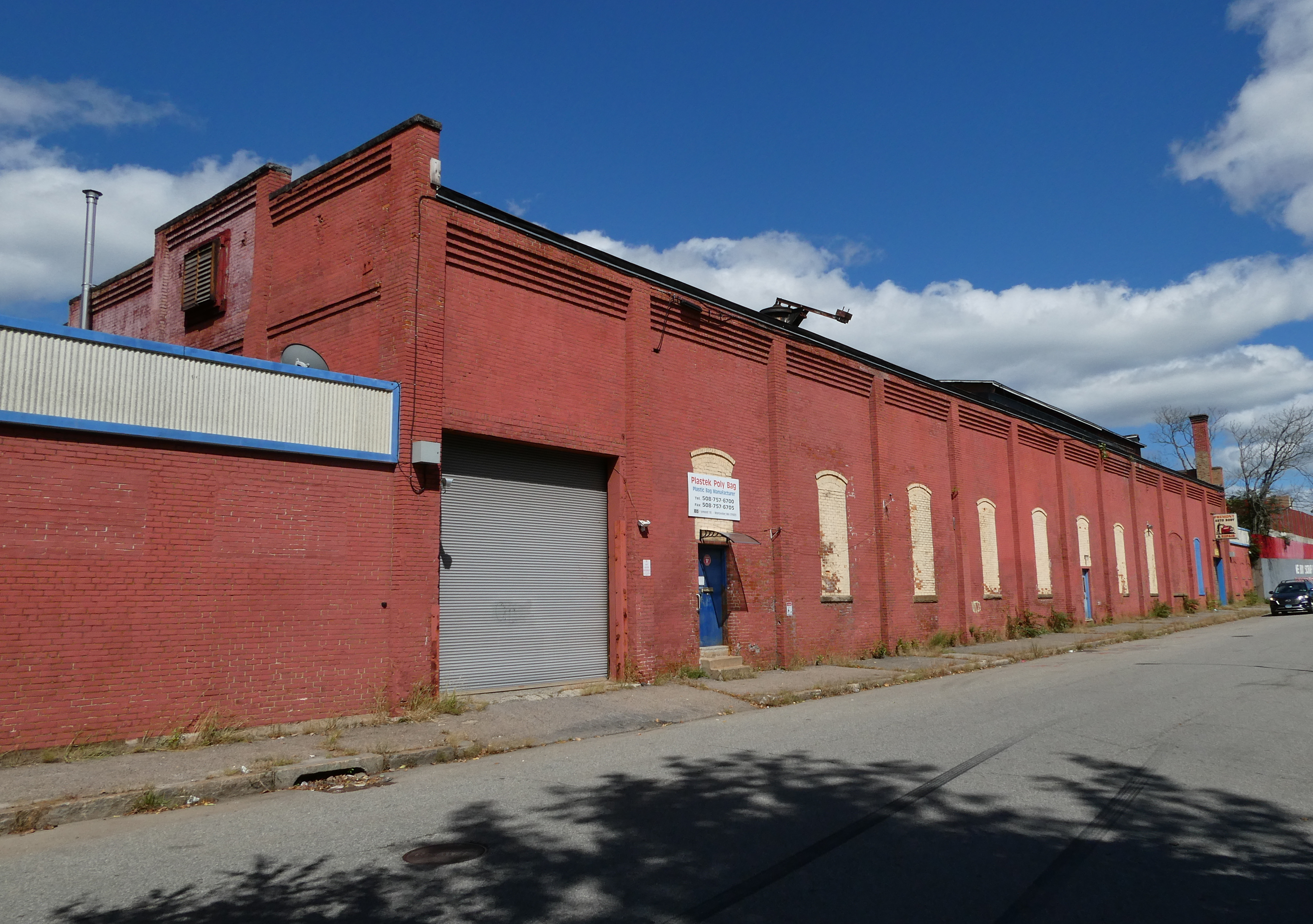
Fremont Street powerhouse

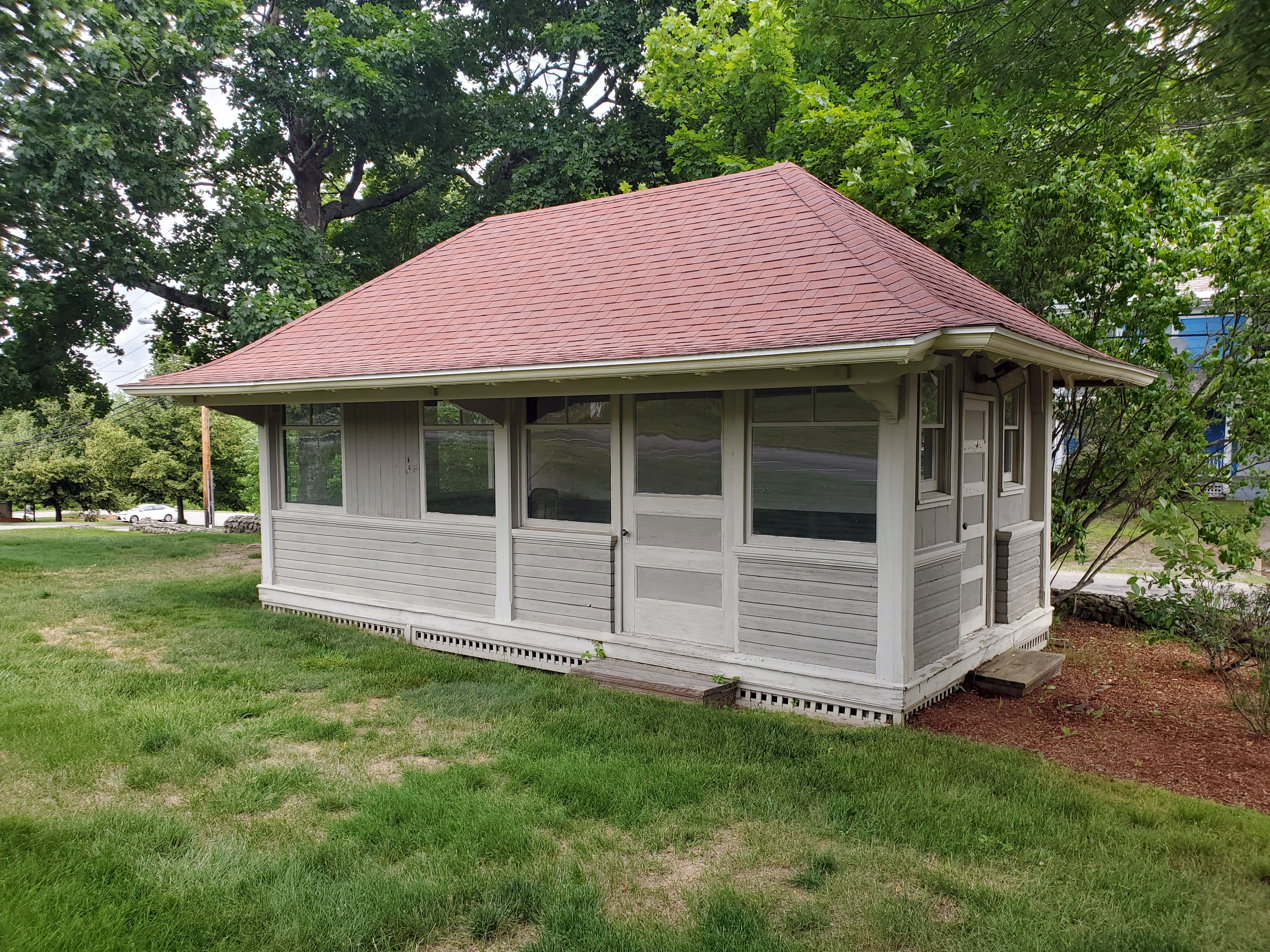
Waiting room at The Overlook

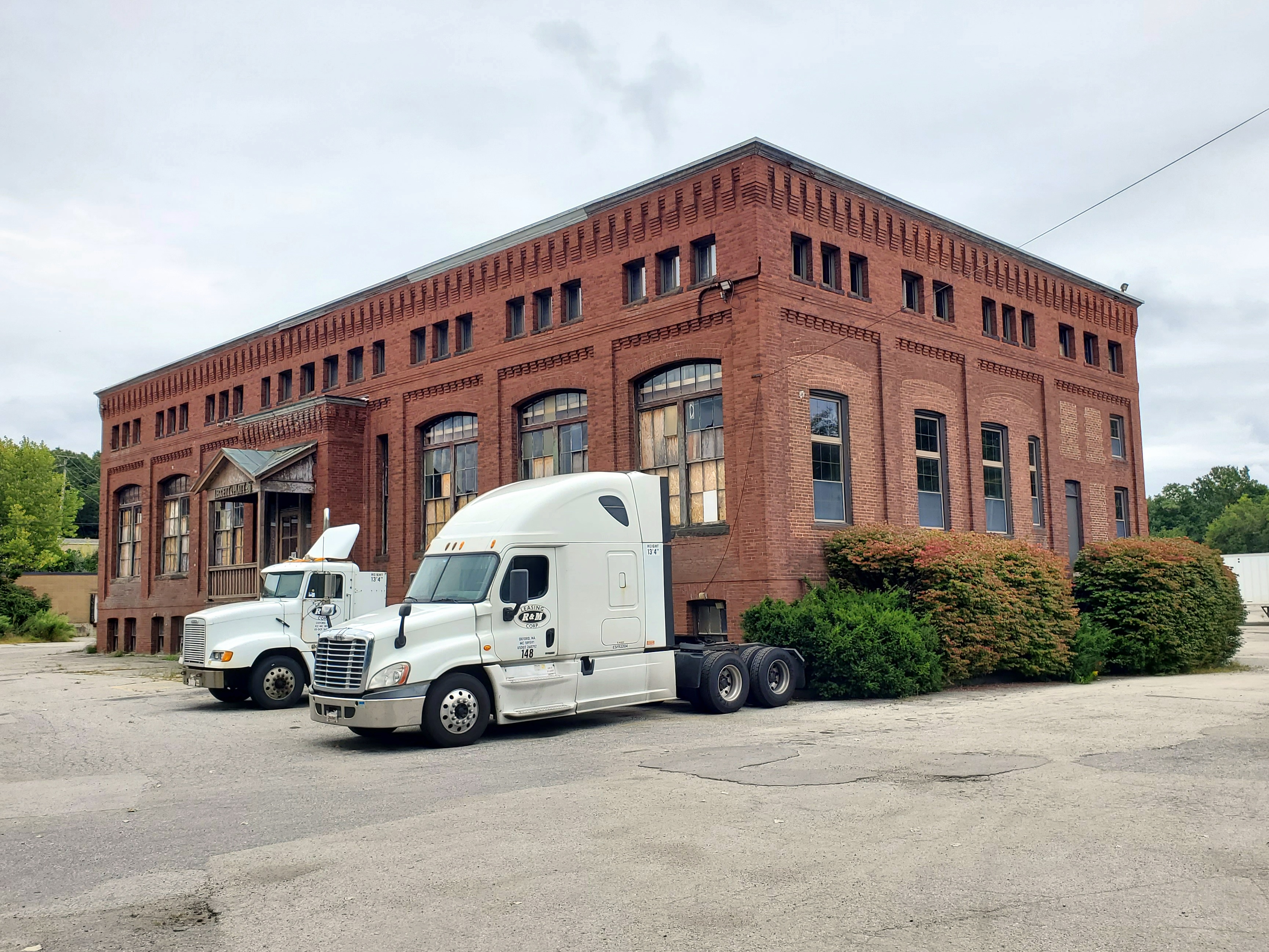
Oxford powerhouse

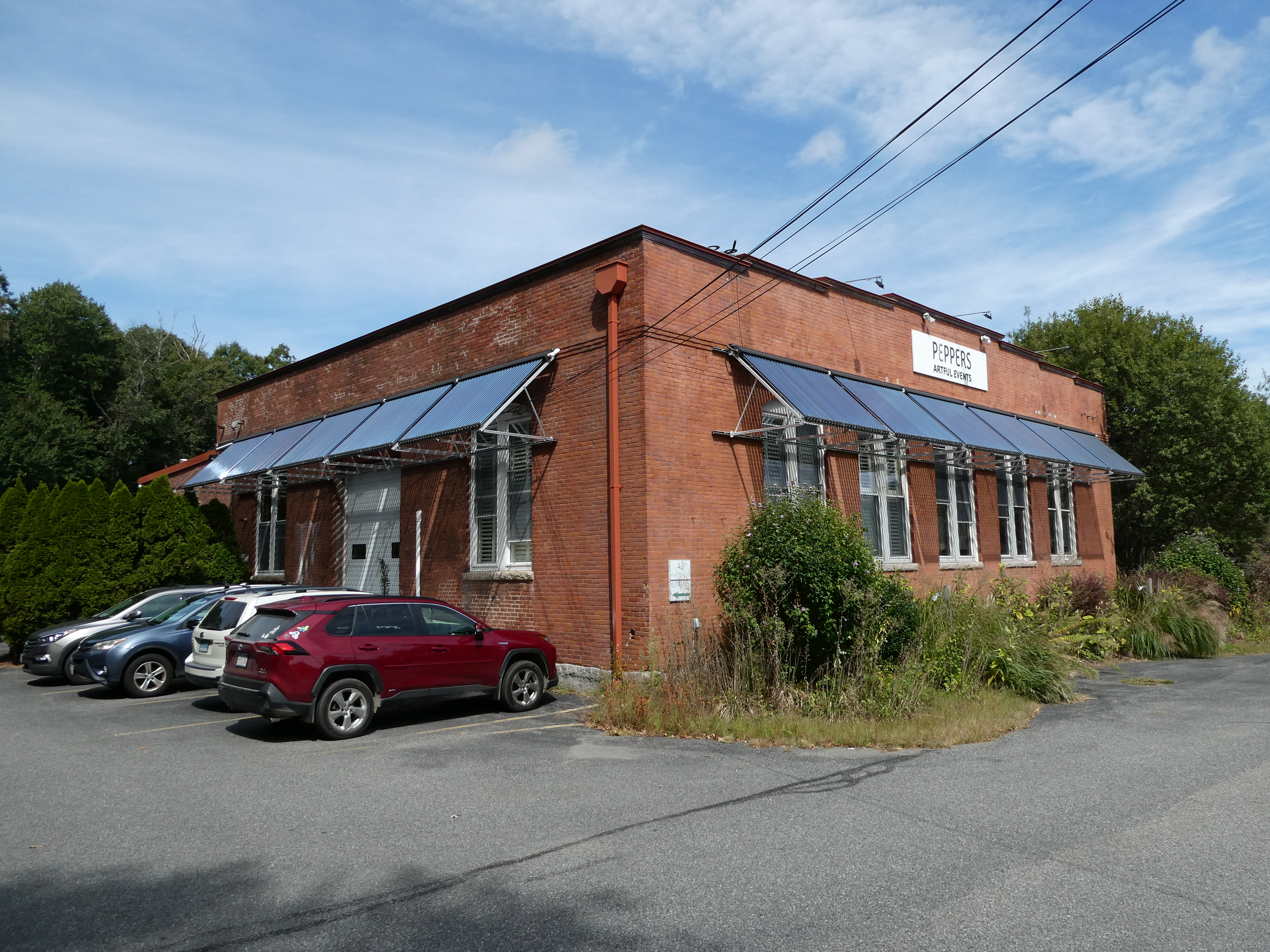
Northborough powerhouse

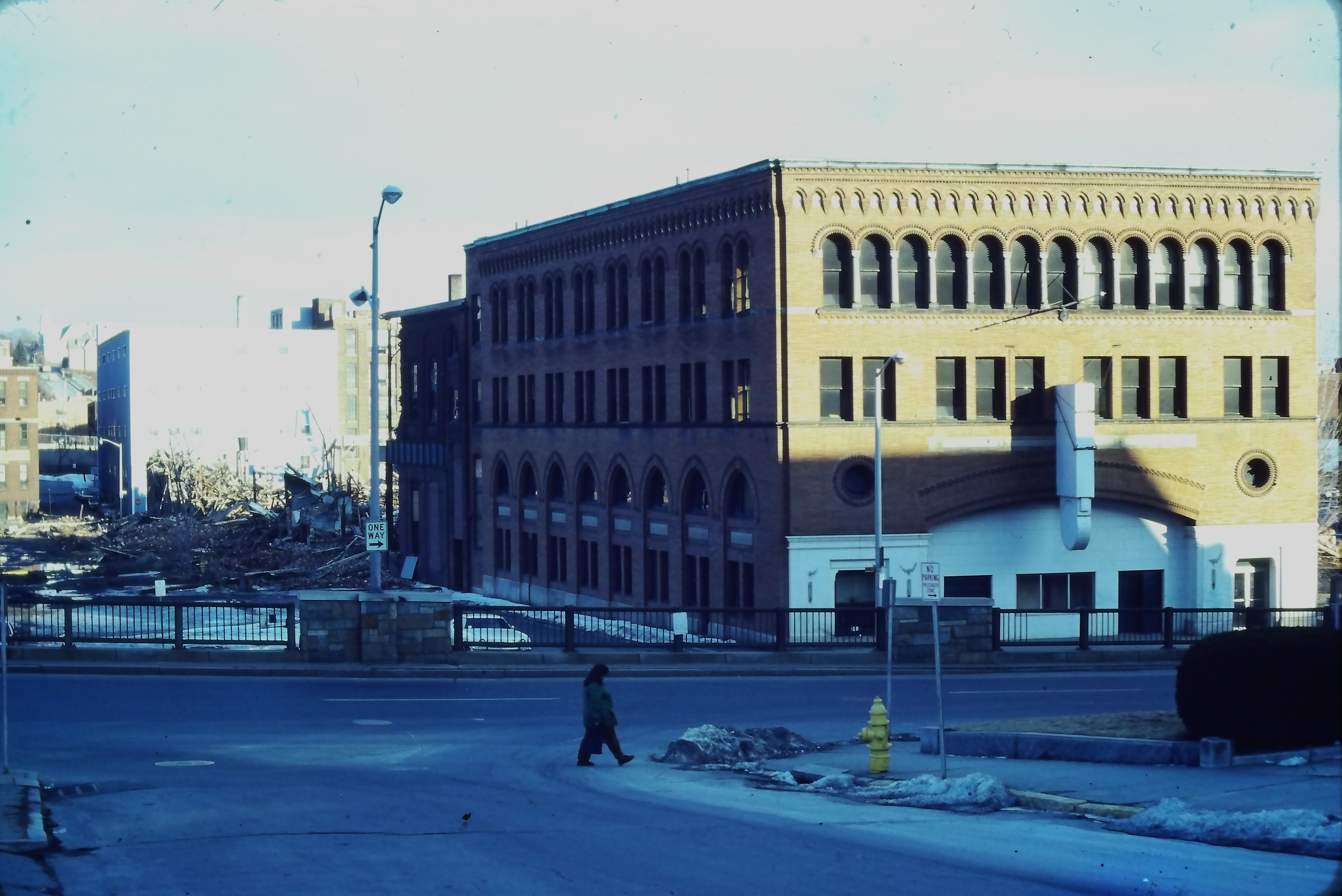
Demolition of the Market Street carhouse

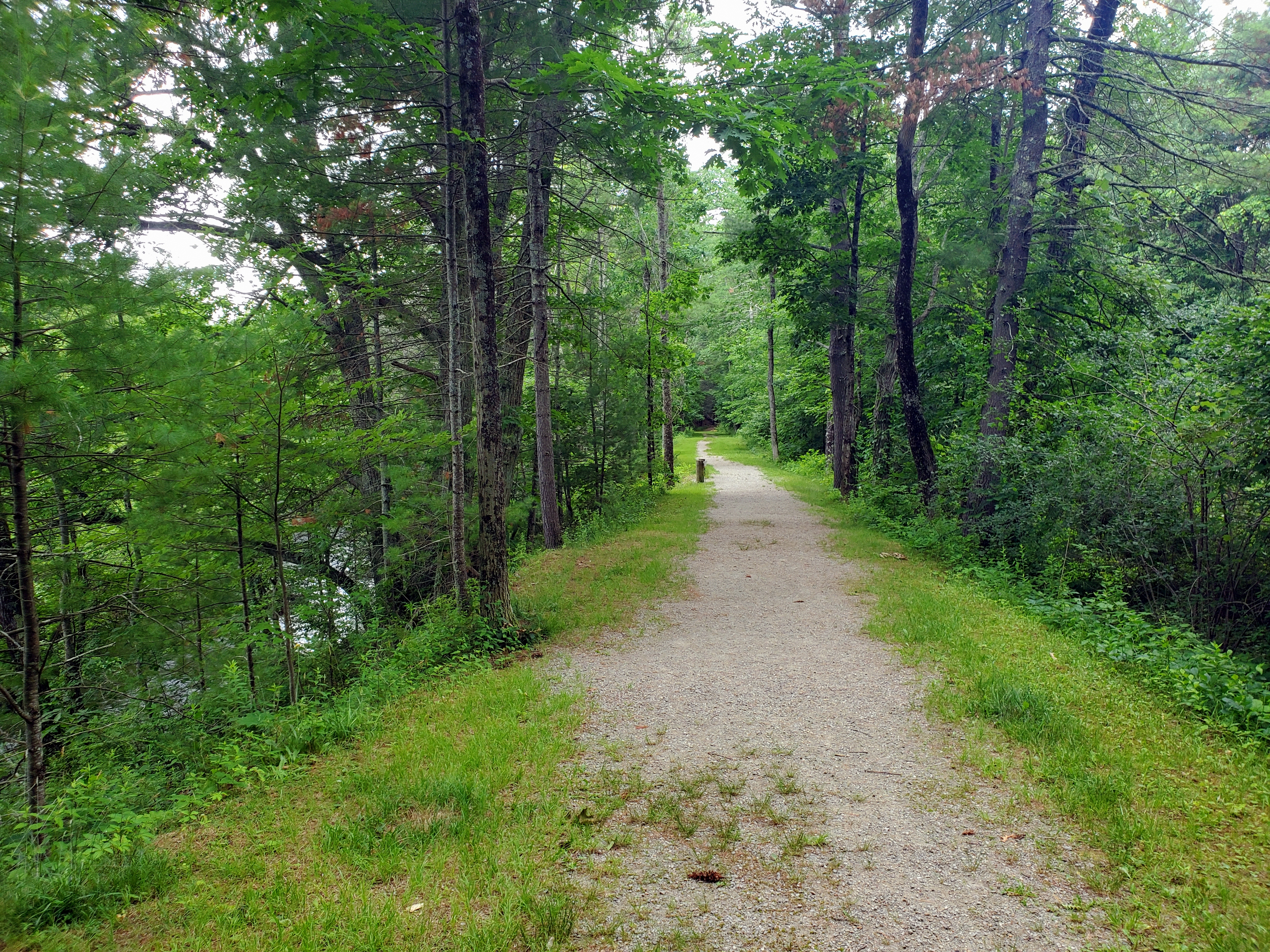
Trolley Line Trail in Sturbridge
