= Ware & Brookfield Street Railway =

Electric streetcar system, Massachusetts (1901 to 1918)

- Image of a Ware & Brookfield St. Ry. trolley #2 built by Wason Manufacturing Company.

Overview
- Main regions: Ware, Massachusetts; Ware Center; Hardwick, Massachusetts; Gilbertville, Massachusetts; West Brookfield, Massachusetts; West Brookfield Center; West Brookfield (CDP); New Braintree, Massachusetts
- Key people: J. Edward Brooks (President); Henry G. Brooks (Vice President); David E. Pepin (1st Superintendent); J.F. Lambert (2nd Superintendent)
- Dates of operation: 1901–1918
- Predecessor: The Hampshire & Worcester Street Railway Company
- Successor: PVTA (unofficially, B79 bus)

Technical
- Track gauge: 1,435 mm (4 ft 8 1/2 in)
- Electrification: Overhead line
- Length: 12–14 miles (19–23 km)
- Highest elevation: 403–777 feet (123–237 m)

The Ware & Brookfield Street Railway Company (WBSR), originally chartered as the Hampshire & Worcester Street Railway Company, was a small interurban electric streetcar system that operated from 1901 to 1918 in central and western Massachusetts, connecting the towns of Ware, West Brookfield, Gilbertville, Hardwick, and New Braintree. With roughly 12 to 14 miles (19 to 23 km) of track, the railway played a pivotal role in linking the street railway networks of eastern and western Massachusetts as the final link in the first continuous streetcar corridor between Boston and Springfield.

The WBSR provided both passenger and limited freight (or "trolley express") service and connected with the Warren, Brookfield and Spencer Street Railway and the Springfield & Eastern Street Railway, as well as the Boston & Albany and Boston & Maine. The system was ultimately dismantled in 1918, becoming the first electric railway in Western Massachusetts to be abandoned. Despite its relatively short life, the WBSR served as a critical transportation link in a region that has lacked local transit ever since.

== Description ==
Straddling Hampshire and Worcester County, Massachusetts the Ware & Brookfield's trams served the communities of Ware/Center, West Brookfield/Center/CDP, Gilbertville, Hardwick and New Braintree, Massachusetts, connecting them with each other and to the larger economies of Worcester and Springfield.

In addition to its own 12-14 mile network, trolley connections to practically anywhere else in the state could be made via transfers to the Warren, Brookfield & Spencer (later renamed the Worcester & Warren Street Railway) and the Springfield & Eastern (later the Springfield Street Railway's Palmer Division). The tracks were eventually connected to these connecting street railways, and although plans to offer through-service via this connection were announced, it is unclear whether the promised one-seat passenger service was ever actually implemented, as it indeed had been in regards to "trolley express" (freight) service.

The Ware & Brookfield Street Railway additionally connected to three regional rail stations in the area, the Boston & Albany depots in both Ware and Gilbertville, and the Boston & Maine depot in West Brookfield, the latter two of which are still standing, albeit as a diner and a museum, respectively, and without passenger service since the 1960s—for now at least (Massachusetts Central Railroad has expressed interest in operating a tourist train of some kind from the Gilbertville depot, which it now owns).

The Ware & Brookfield Street Railway additionally connected to three regional rail stations in the area, the Boston & Albany depots in both Ware and Gilbertville, and the Boston & Maine depot in West Brookfield, the latter of which is still standing, albeit without passenger service.

The completion of the WBSR was highly significant to the region at large, in that, when it was completed to the terminus of the two adjacent street railways then serving Ware and West Brookfield, the last remaining gap between the street railway networks of Boston/Worcester/Rhode Island (connected) and Springfield/Connecticut/New York City (also connected) was bridged, after which point it became possible to travel nearly anywhere between Boston and New York entirely by streetcar.

There had been hopes of extending the Gilbertville line further north to connect with Fitchburg Railroad via a proposed extension of the Athol & Orange Street Railway to Worcester (via Barre and Petersham), however, this vision remained unrealized at the time of the railroad's demise.

== History ==
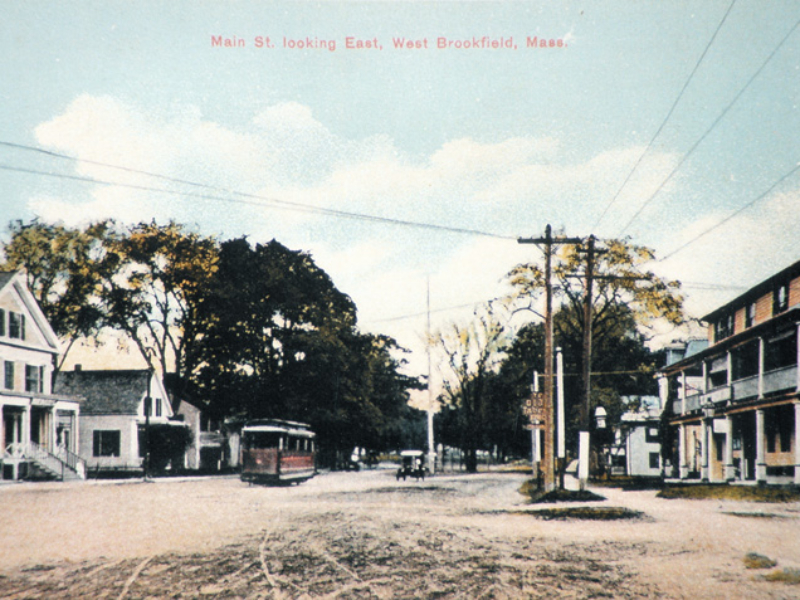
Tram on Route 9 in West Brookfield, MA, of either the Warren, Brookfield and Spencer or Ware & Brookfield Street Railway, both of which served the town.

=== Origins ===
The origins of the Ware & Brookfield Street Railway can be traced back to at least as far back as February, 1898, when a group, led by one Frederick D. Gilmore identified itself as the Ware Street Railway Company and subsequently petitioned the state legislature for incorporation under that name, as was the procedure at the time.

The Ware Street Railway, which existed only on paper but had access to significant capital, and the Springfield & Eastern Street Railway, which operated an existing tram line between Palmer and Monson (it was known as the Palmer & Monson at the time), competed vigorously for the franchises to build new lines between Ware, Palmer, Gilbertville, Hardwick, New Braintree, Warren, West Warren, East, North and West Brookfield.

While it was ultimately agreed that it made the most sense for The Springfield & Eastern to build the line from Palmer to Ware, originally, the Ware Street Railway Company had been seen as the favorite, having fought for the favor of citizens and selectmen that town, which, along with Palmer (already spoken for by the S&E) was the most populous of the several in the area.

The thought in Ware had been that the most locally oriented company would be the most likely to build carbarns and other infrastructure in Ware, benefiting the local economy, and with Ware's regional influence, it was thus granted locations in Warren and West Brookfield, anticipating the subsequent bequeathment of franchise rights to operate a railway on those lands. So, in anticipation of those rights, the Ware company was formally incorporated on Halloween of 1899.

By 1900, a railroad speculator that had been involved with the Hoosac Tunnel and Western Railway known as Continental Construction Company would enter the competition for legal rights to build one or more of the proposed interurban railways in the area, and it at first petitioned the selectmen of North Brookfield for permission to erect catenary poles and lay track on a route beginning in that town.

=== Demise ===
The Ware & Brookfield Street Railway ceased operations on Sunday, February 3rd, 1918, the first electric railway to be abandoned in the history of the state, but certainly not the last, serving as a dire warning to the countless interurbans that once connected the state, all but one of which would ultimately meet the same fate.

The railroad was sold as scrap to a Boston junk dealer for $51,000 on Monday, April 21st, 1918 and dissolved by an act of the state legislature the following year.

These days, the PVTA's intercity route B79 bus stops once at Ware Town Hall and again in West Brookfield on its way between Amherst and Worcester. To this day, however, there is no strictly local (in-town) transit service within the towns formerly served by the WBSR, and no transportation whatsoever to Gilbertville, Hardwick or New Braintree, despite the former two communities falling within MART's official service area.
