= Springfield and Eastern Street Railway =

Railway in Massachusetts

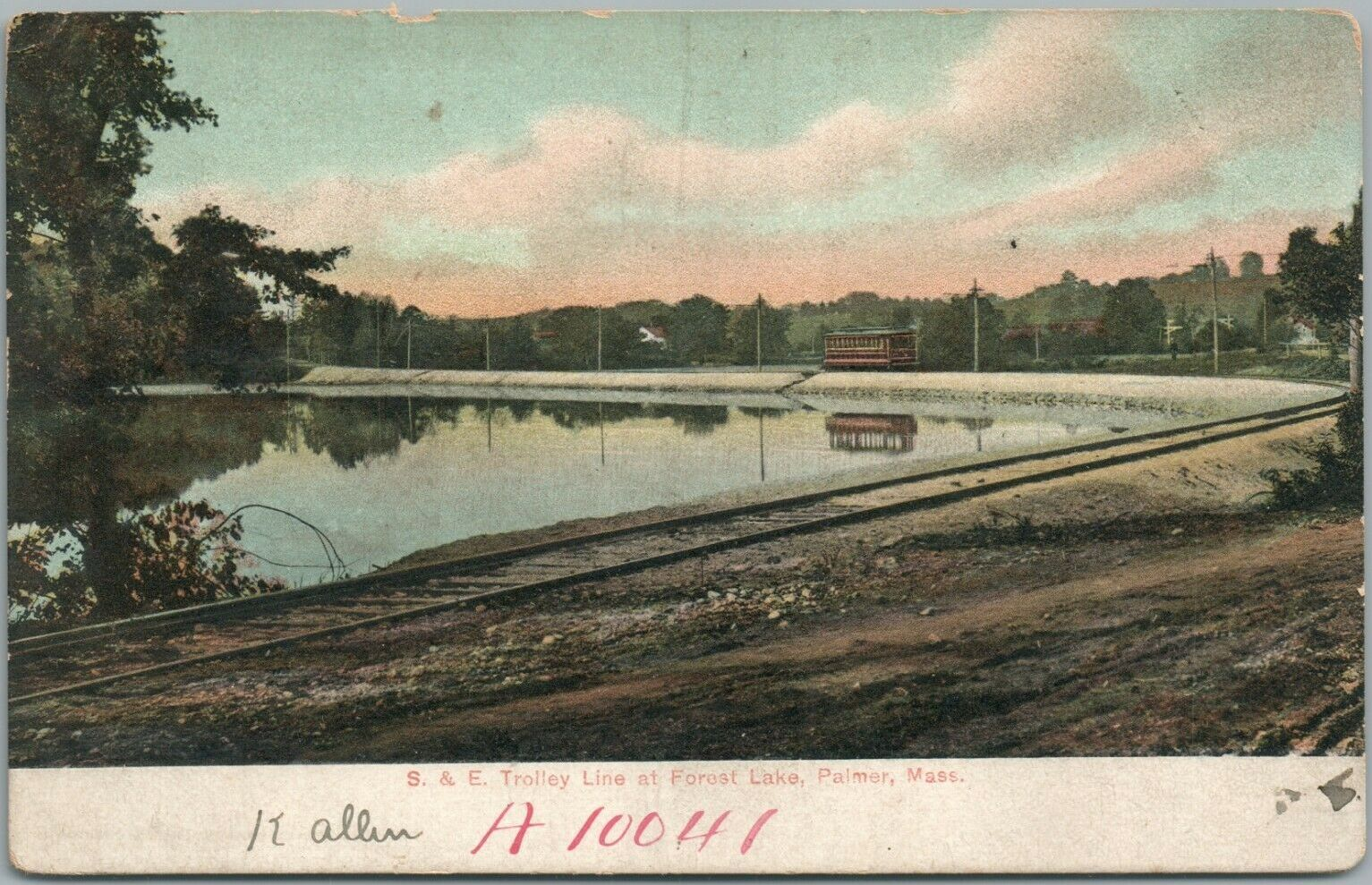
Postcard of a Springfield and Eastern streetcar at Forest Lake in Palmer

The Springfield and Eastern Street Railway, originally the Palmer and Monson Street Railway, was a streetcar company in the towns east of Springfield, Massachusetts.

== History ==
The first line of the Palmer and Monson Street Railway opened in 1898, connecting Palmer to Monson. It was controlled by the Consolidated Railway of Connecticut. In May 1901 the company was renamed to the Springfield and Eastern Street Railway. An extension to the Springfield Street Railway in Ludlow opened on September 17, 1901, and a line to Brimfield opened in July 1907.

On September 1, 1905, the Springfield Street Railway leased the Springfield and Eastern. In 1906 the S&E, along with most other Massachusetts properties of the Consolidated Railway (including the Springfield Street Railway), was sold to the New England Investment and Security Company. On November 26, 1910, following long protracted hearings before the state, the Springfield Street Railway would officially merge with the Springfield and Eastern, retaining its name in some uses, subsequently it would also be referred to as the company's Palmer Line Division.

By 1927 buses had replaced the trolleys.

== Lines ==
The original line ran between Palmer and Monson, and was later extended to South Monson. Most of this was over the present Route 32, except in two places. In Palmer, instead of crossing the Boston and Albany Railroad east of downtown with current Route 32, the line continued with Main Street, crossing the tracks downtown. Additionally, the tracks used a private right-of-way in North Monson, crossing the New London Northern Railroad at Bunyan Road.

The line from Palmer to Ludlow followed US 20 out the west end of Palmer. Just before the crossing of the Quaboag River, the tracks split to cross the river north of the road, and then crossed to the south side of the road onto a private right-of-way just north of the Boston and Albany Railroad. The part of this across the river has since become a realignment of the road. Near the Palmer/Wilbraham town line, the line left the north side of the B&A and returned to the road, continuing west to the border with Springfield, across the Chicopee River from Ludlow. At the end of this route, the road now known as Old Boston Road, Stony Hill Road and River Road was used.

The line from Palmer to Brimfield split from the Monson line just south of where it entered current Route 32. From there it ran on a private right-of-way cross-country to a point on US 20 at the split with Monson Road. The part of this alignment in Brimfield has since become a realignment of US 20. From there, the tracks continued along current US 20 to Brimfield center.

The line from Palmer to Ware headed north out of Palmer on present Route 32, splitting just before Palmer Center onto High Street. It continued north along River Street to Whipples, continuing on a private right-of-way (part of which is now River Street) back to Route 32, which it used to Ware. From Ware, a line continued along Route 32 to Gilbertville, with a branch heading east along Route 9 to the Warren, Brookfield and Spencer Street Railway at the present merge with Route 67 in West Brookfield. Some or all of these continuations past Ware may have been built and operated by the WB&S or another company.

A branch of the line to Ware turned west, continuing on High Street past River Street. It used Commercial Street and Main Street through Thorndike, ending at Three Rivers. A branch of that split at Four Corners, running north on present Route 181 to Bondsville and its Central Massachusetts Railroad station.
