= Berkshire Street Railway =

Former streetcar network of the Berkshires, Massachusetts, US

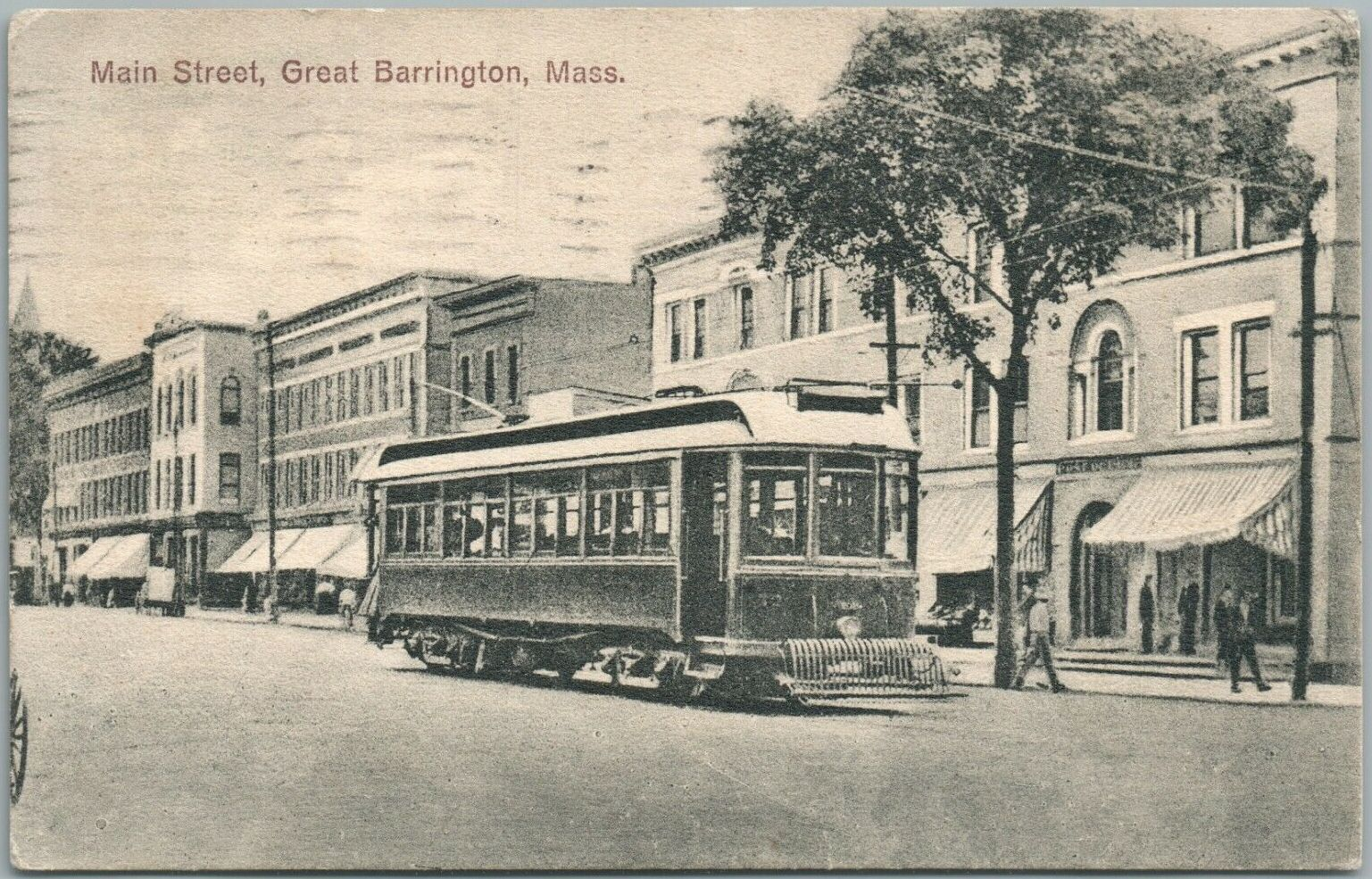
- A Berkshire Street Railway tram on Main Street in Great Barrington, Massachusetts, 1911.

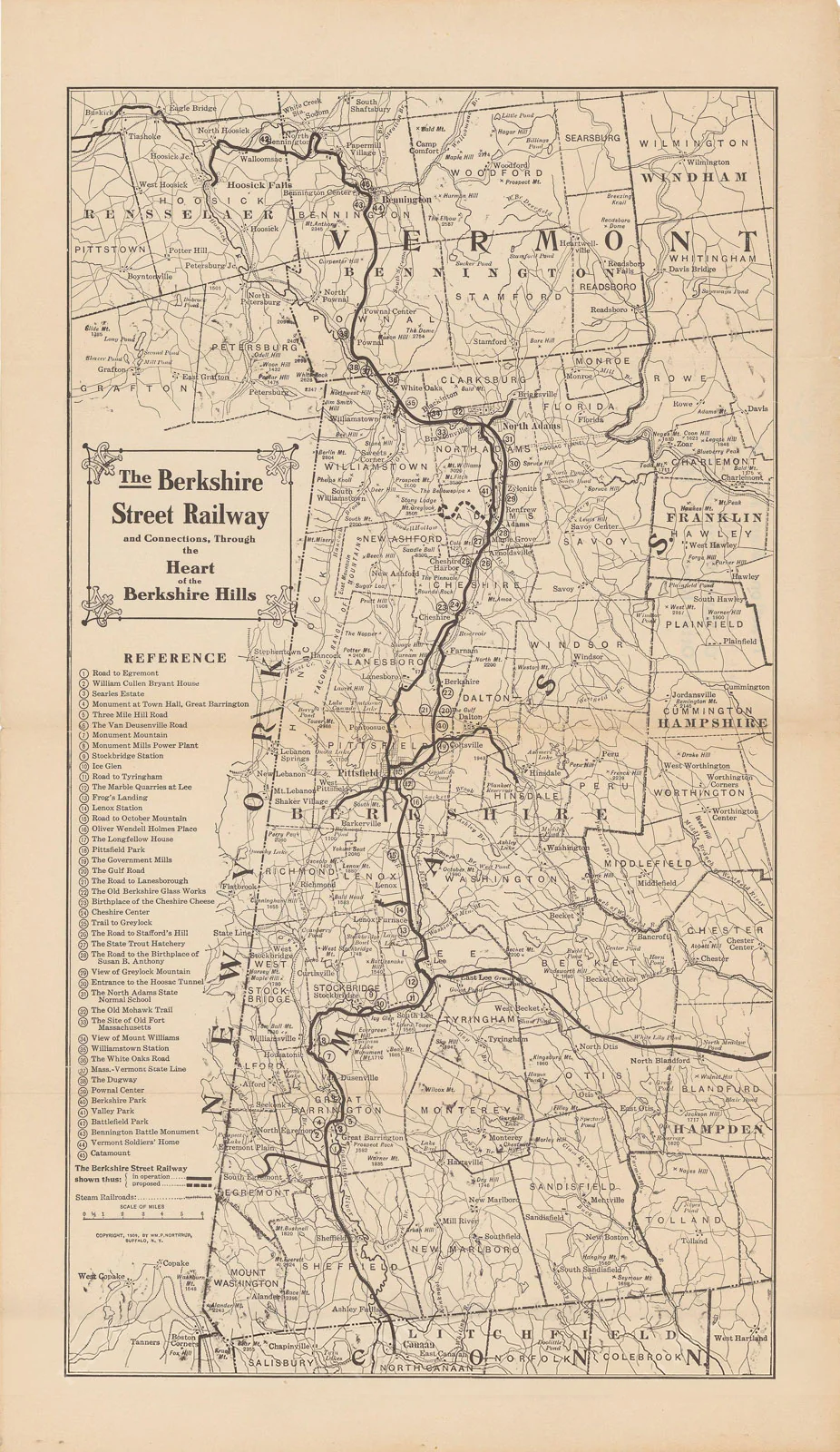
- Map of the Berkshire Street Railway

Overview
- Owner: New York, New Haven & Hartford Railroad (1905–1958)
- Area served: Pittsfield; North Adams; Adams; Great Barrington; Lee; Dalton; Stockbridge; West Stockbridge; Williamstown; Lanesborough; Egremont; Hinsdale; Cheshire; Becket; Otis; Blandford; Huntington; Sheffield; Clarksburg; Canaan, CT; Pownal, VT; Bennington, VT; Hoosick Falls, NY
- Locale: Berkshire County, Massachusetts, with lines extending into Vermont, New York, and Connecticut
- Transit type: Streetcar, Interurban, Tram
- Number of lines: Approx. 12 main routes at peak
- Annual ridership: 15 million (peak)
- Chief executive: Ralph D. Gillett (as of 1904)
- Headquarters: 1277 East Street; Pittsfield, MA 01201

Operation
- Began operation: October 9, 1886 (as horsecar line)
- Ended operation: November 12, 1932
- Operator: Berkshire Street Railway Company
- Character: Mixed grade (street running & private right-of-way)

Technical
- System length: 170 mi (270 km) (owned and leased)
- Track gauge: 1,435 mm (4 ft 8 1/2 in) standard gauge
- Electrification: Overhead wire, 550 V DC

The Berkshire Street Railway Company (BSR) of Massachusetts was one of many interurban streetcar systems in North America around the turn of the century, incorporated by that name in 1901 with local service in Pittsfield beginning in Summer of 1902, soon expanding from the Berkshires to Vermont, New York and Connecticut.

At its greatest extent, the Berkshire Street Railway served as many as 15 million passengers per year along 171 miles of track, 134 of which it owned directly. To this day, it remains the only light rail system in history to operate across four states.

By 1905, the Berkshire Street Railway had expanded to North Adams and Great Barrington through Pittsfield. Lines were soon extended into neighboring states, with service to Canaan, Connecticut, Bennington, Vermont and Hoosick Falls, New York as well.

This was in addition to local service to Stockbridge, Lee, Egremont, Hinsdale, Cheshire, Williamstown, Adams, Dalton, Lenox and throughout the Berkshires as well as a connection to the Springfield Street Railway in Huntington, Massachusetts.

By 1905, it was acquired and made a subsidiary of the New York, New Haven and Hartford Railroad as was the case with numerous other street railways in the region such as the Springfield Street Railway, Worcester Consolidated Street Railway, United Electric Railways (Rhode Island), the Connecticut Company and others, most of which were acquired by the railroad conglomerate.

== Predecessors ==
Prior to the formation of the Berkshire Street Railway Company, a horse-drawn tram line through downtown Pittsfield, the Pittsfield Street Railway and another from Adams to North Adams, the Hoosac Valley Street Railway, had both been in operation since 1886. The Hoosac Valley was electrified in 1889, and the Pittsfield in 1891, at which point the latter was renamed the Pittsfield Electric Street Railway.

While initially in competition for franchises in some cases, these and other street railways were gradually consolidated into the Berkshire Street Railway.

The other local operations absorbed by the Berkshire after it was acquired by the New York, New Haven and Hartford Railroad were Bennington Electric Railroad, Bennington & Hoosick Valley Railway, Bennington & North Adams Street Railway, Hoosick Falls Railroad, and the Vermont Company (the latter two of which it leased) which formed the Berkshire Street Railway's network at its greatest extent.

== Failed merger and line closures ==
In 1911, while the connecting line was still under construction, The Berkshire Street Railway applied to acquire the Springfield Street Railway in a merger, another subsidiary of the New York, New Haven & Hartford.

By 1915, the Springfield Street Railway was very nearly connected with the Berkshire, as both had built, or were building, tracks to Huntington, with the Springfield's Westfield Line having been extended there previously. However, the state law authorizing the extensions also prohibited the two companies from connecting their tracks directly, and thus even after the Berkshire's line to Huntington was complete, there was technically no direct service between Pittsfield and Springfield, as passengers were required to walk a few blocks to transfer.

The proposed merger was later expanded to include the Worcester Consolidated Street Railway, but the new entity, which would have been called the 'Worcester, Springfield & Berkshire Street Railway Company' was ultimately denied incorporation by the state.

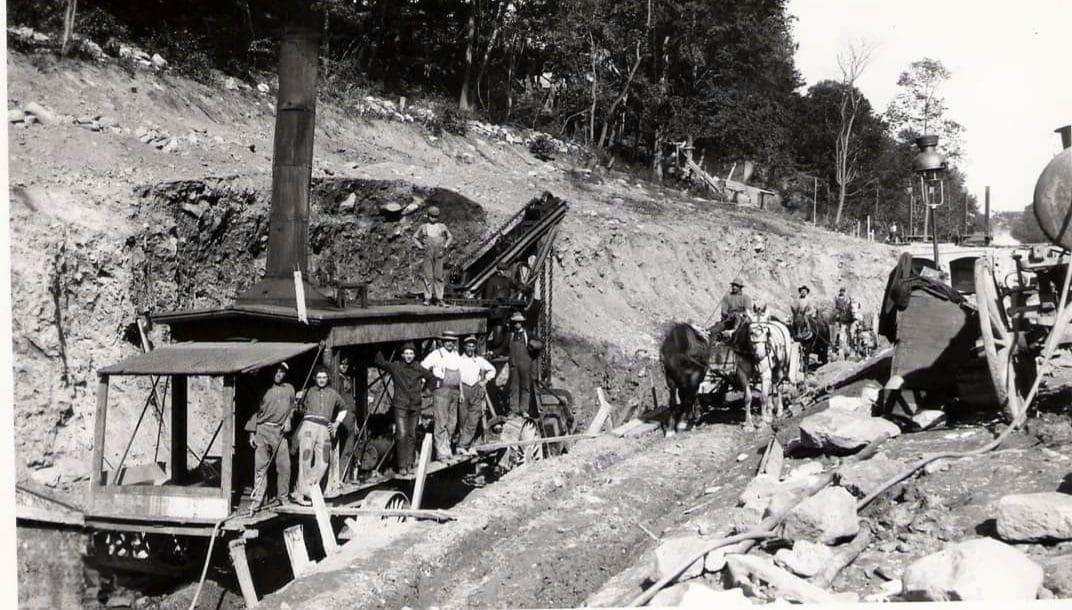
Construction of the Berkshire Street Railway's 'Huckleberry Trolley Line' c. 1911–1912.

Ostensibly due to a new tariff being levied against the railway, and combined with the refusal of local governments already suffering from wartime austerity to provide an operating subsidy and keep the company solvent, the railway petitioned the state to abandon a significant portion of its routes.

These included the lines from Lee to Huntington connecting with the Springfield Street Railway (still known locally as the 'Huckleberry Trolley' line), which had only recently been completed at an expense of over $3,000,000, and was the BSR's only connection with the other interurban street railways of the region.

Additionally included in the petition for abandonment, which was approved by the state in 1918, were the Berkshire Street Railway's lines to Egremont and Canaan, Connecticut, both of which ceased to operate that same year.

Following the WWI-era line closures, the Bennington, Vermont line was closed when the BSR terminated its lease with the Vermont Company in the early 1920s, leaving only the most heavily traveled lines through Pittsfield, North Adams, Lee and Great Barrington remaining in service until November 12, 1932, when the last streetcar service was terminated. The Berkshire Street Railway became an early victim of the Great Depression, and most of the tracks had been torn out by the 1950s, particularly for scrap metal during WWII.

== Legacy ==
Following the 1933 termination of streetcar service, only privately operated bus services or 'jitneys' remained, until the Berkshire Regional Transit Authority was formed in 1974, which operates public bus service six days a week in some of the communities formerly connected to the Berkshire Street Railway, but is not a direct successor of the BSR, unlike some other Regional Transit Authorities in Massachusetts such as the PVTA in relation to the Holyoke Street Railway.

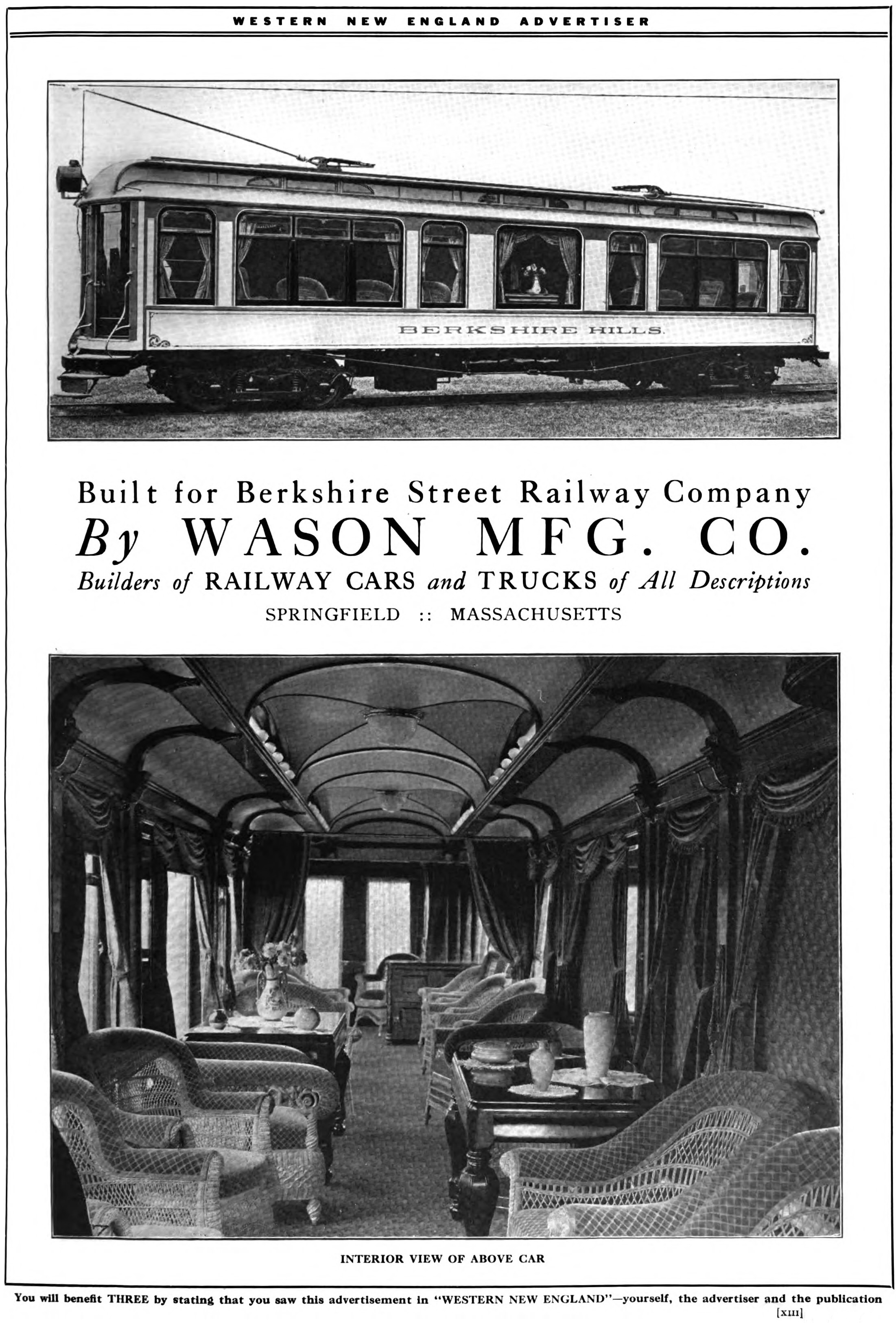
1912 Advertisement for the Luxurious 'Berkshire Hills' parlor car, the only surviving Berkshire trolley in existence, saved by the Shelburne Falls Trolley Museum.

The 'Huckleberry Trolley', as the line connecting with Springfield Street Railway in Huntington was known, ran on a private right-of-way and remains mostly intact except for a few sections obliterated by the Massachusetts Turnpike, which runs near or alongside the former interurban line in places such as Blandford.

As recently as 2021, converting a portion of the intact Vermont/New York line, which like the 'Huckleberry' also ran on private right-of-way, into a rail trail, was being discussed by the Bennington County Regional Commission, though it is unclear if those efforts are ongoing or whether they would involve railbanking.

The only Berkshire Street Railway car that is known to have survived is the famously luxurious 'Berkshire Hills' parlor car, called "the most exquisite" of its kind. The luxury trolley had been built by Wason Manufacturing of Springfield in 1903, and was in regular service on the Berkshire Street Railway from 1908 to 1917, after which it was used as a diner for many years.

Despite suffering severe fire damage, the structure of the luxury trolley car remains intact and has been, since 2025, located at the Shelburne Falls Trolley Museum, where the museum is currently raising the funds needed to restore the badly damaged 'Berkshire Hills' car to its original splendor and operate it car on their electrified line, as they have done previously with another immaculately restored trolley.

A photograph of the 'Berkshire Hills' parlor car in its present, unrestored state can be found on the trolley museum's website.
