= Doug McMurdy =

Canadian professional ice hockey player (1926–2010)

- Born: February 9, 1926 Winnipeg, Manitoba, Canada
- Died: May 16, 2010 (aged 84) West Brookfield, Massachusetts, U.S.
- Height: 6 ft 0 in (183 cm)
- Weight: 170 lb (77 kg; 12 st 2 lb)
- Position: Centre / Defence
- Shot: Left
- Played for: Springfield Indians; Syracuse Warriors; Pittsburgh Hornets
- Playing career: 1945–1959

Doug McMurdy (February 9, 1926 – May 16, 2010) was a Canadian professional ice hockey player, and coach. He played both centre and defence, and skated for 376 games in the American Hockey League, mostly with the Springfield Indians. McMurdy was the inaugural winner of the Red Tilson Trophy, as the most outstanding junior player in the Ontario Hockey Association (OHA) in 1945.

== Amateur career ==
Doug McMurdy was born on February 9, 1926, in Winnipeg, Manitoba. He was brought to the St. Catharines Falcons for the 1943–44 OHA season by fellow Manitoban and coach Rudy Pilous. In his second year of junior hockey, McMurdy won the inaugural Red Tilson Trophy for the 1944–45 OHA season as the most valuable player, and was the top scoring defenceman in the league.

== Professional career ==
McMurdy signed with the Toronto Maple Leafs in 1945, for a salary of $5000 and bonus of $1200. He was converted to a centre by Leafs coach Hap Day, and assigned to the minor leagues. His first season in the AHL was played with the Pittsburgh Hornets, then two seasons with the Tulsa Oilers in the United States Hockey League.

McMurdy was traded to Springfield in 1948, and played the next nine seasons under the control of team owner, Eddie Shore. Teams in the National Hockey League inquired about McMurdy, but Shore declined offers to sell or trade him. When Shore moved his AHL team to Syracuse, he assigned McMurdy to the farm team in Springfield partway though the 1951–52 season. McMurdy was named the player–coach for the Springfield Indians for the next two seasons. He led the Springfield Indians to the Walker Cup as regular season champions in the Eastern Amateur Hockey League in 1952–53, but the Indians lost in the playoff finals to the Johnstown Jets. McMurdy and the Indians moved up to the Quebec Hockey League for the 1953–54 season. The team struggled and finished last place. Shore returned his AHL team to Springfield in 1954, and McMurdy played the next three seasons in the AHL with the Indians. He finished his AHL career in Springfield with 85 goals, 182 assists, and 267 points in 286 games.

McMurdy played the 1957–58 season with the Trois-Rivières Lions in the QHL, then finished his career playing defence for New Haven Blades in the 1958–59 season.

== Later life and honours ==
McMurdy was inducted into Springfield Hockey Hall of Fame in 2000. He died on May 16, 2010, in West Brookfield, Massachusetts.

== Playing statistics ==
Career statistics as a player.

			Regular Season					Playoffs
Season	Team	League	GP	G	A	Pts	PIM	GP	G	A	Pts	PIM
1943–44	St. Catharines Falcons	OHA	—	—	—	—	—	—	—	—	—	—
1944–45	St. Catharines Falcons	OHA	20	11	25	36	21	—	—	—	—	—
1945–46	Pittsburgh Hornets	AHL	42	7	25	32	6	6	0	3	3	2
1946–47	Tulsa Oilers	USHL	59	19	34	53	43	—	0	1	1	0
1947–48	Tulsa Oilers	USHL	65	20	40	60	35	—	1	1	2	0
1948–49	Springfield Indians	AHL	57	27	39	66	14	3	0	7	7	0
1949–50	Springfield Indians	AHL	66	17	33	50	25	2	3	0	3	0
1950–51	Springfield Indians	AHL	22	2	10	12	0	—	—	—	—	—
1951–52	Syracuse Warriors	AHL	48	22	13	35	22	—	—	—	—	—
1951–52	Springfield Indians	EAHL	12	11	16	27	4	—	—	—	—	—
1952–53	Springfield Indians	EAHL	17	13	15	28	33	7	4	3	7	6
1953–54	Springfield Indians	QHL	69	15	38	53	78	—	—	—	—	—
1954–55	Springfield Indians	AHL	52	19	39	58	32	4	0	3	3	2
1955–56	Springfield Indians	AHL	42	14	33	47	22	—	—	—	—	—
1956–57	Springfield Indians	AHL	47	6	28	34	20	—	—	—	—	—
1957–58	Trois-Rivières Lions	QHL	10	1	5	6	12	—	—	—	—	—
1958–59	New Haven Blades	EHL	56	8	23	31	48	5	0	1	1	0
AHL totals			376	114	220	334	141	15	3	13	16	4
USHL totals			124	39	74	113	78	—	1	2	3	0
EAHL/EHL totals			85	32	54	86	85	12	4	4	8	6
QHL totals			79	16	43	59	90	—	—	—	—	—

== Coaching statistics ==
Career statistics as a player-coach.

Season	Team	League	Regular season						Playoffs
Season	Team	League	G	W	L	T	Pts	Finish	Result
1952–53	Springfield Indians	EAHL	60	39	19	2	80	1st in EAHL	Lost in finals
1953–54	Springfield Indians	QHL	72	25	40	7	57	7th in QHL	Missed playoffs
Total			132	64	59	9	137	1 division title	
