= West Brookfield Center Historic District =

Historic district in Massachusetts, United States

- U.S. National Register of Historic Places
- U.S. Historic district
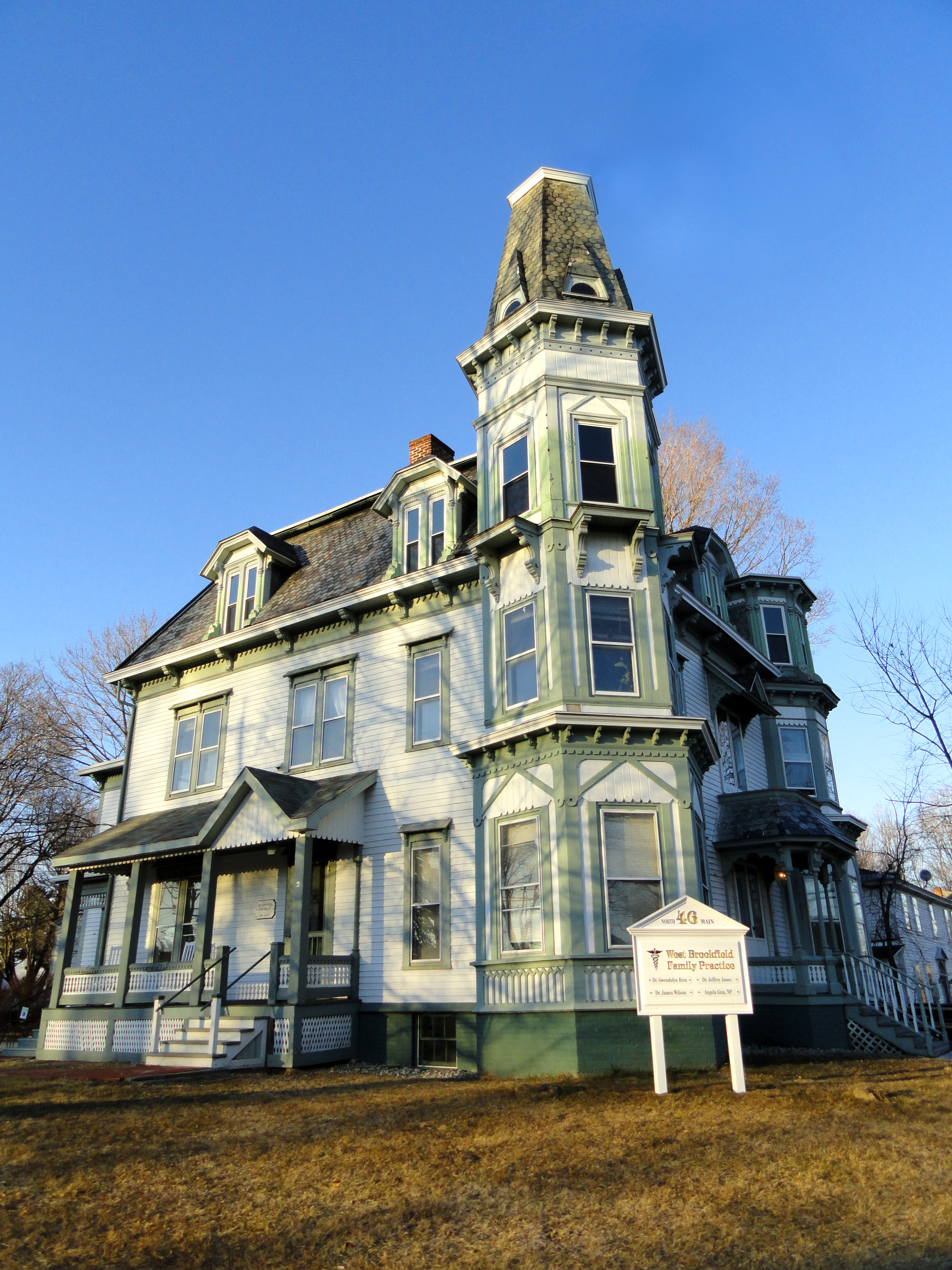
- John Tomblin House

- Location within Massachusetts Location within the United States
- Location: West Brookfield, Massachusetts
- Coordinates: 42°14′4″N 72°8′30″W
- Area: 37.5 acres (15.2 ha)
- Architect: Multiple
- Architectural style: Greek Revival, Federal
- NRHP reference No.: 90000885 (original); 06000401 (increase)

Significant dates
- Added to NRHP: June 28, 1990
- Boundary increase: May 15, 2006

The West Brookfield Center Historic District is a historic district encompassing the historic center of West Brookfield, Massachusetts. When first listed on the National Register of Historic Places in 1990, it was centered on the triangular junction of Main Street, North Main Street, and School Street, extending away from this area along Main Street, North Main Street, and Foster Hill Road. A few of its properties lie on side streets adjacent to these roads. This area represented the core of Brookfield, before it was broken into smaller communities, including West Brookfield. It has a fine collection of 18th and 19th century homes, ranging stylistically from Federal to Queen Anne, as well as the town hall and public library.

The district was enlarged in 2006 to include a residential and industrial area south of the center, primarily along Milk, Front, and Ware Streets. This area was developed largely after the arrival of the railroad in 1839. It is composed mainly of residential structures dating from that time to the early 20th century, although it does include a cluster of fairly nondescript 19th century railroad-related buildings, as well as two passenger depots: a Gothic Revival structure built between 1839 and 1847, and a Richardsonian Romanesque passenger station built in 1884 to a design by Springfield architect Eugene C. Gardner that was strongly influenced by those of H. H. Richardson, who had designed other depots for the Boston and Albany Railroad. The earlier station is among the oldest purpose-built railroad stations still standing in the United States.

== See also ==
- National Register of Historic Places listings in Worcester County, Massachusetts
