= Springfield Street Railway =

Former streetcar network in Massachusetts, US

- Logo of the Springfield Street Railway Co., c. 1940

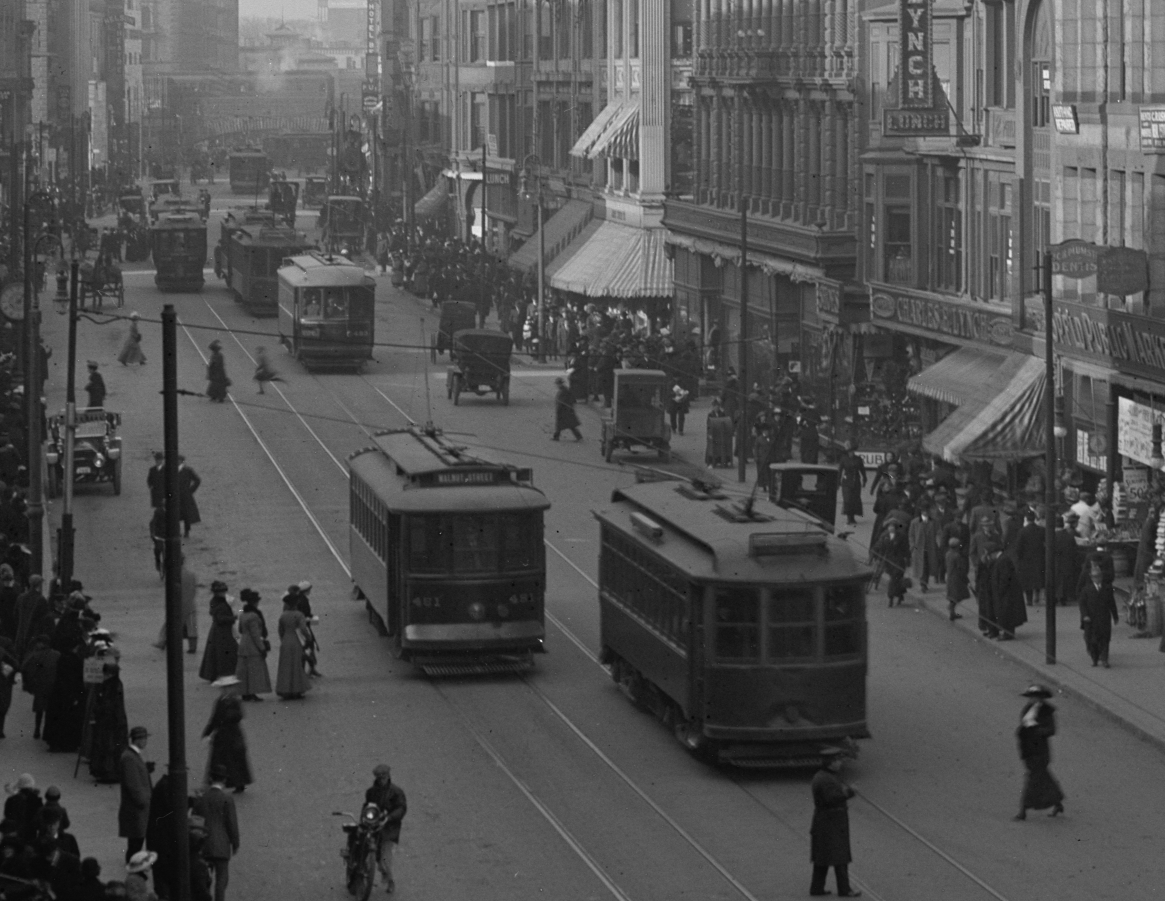
- Cars of the Springfield Street Railway on Main Street, c. 1910

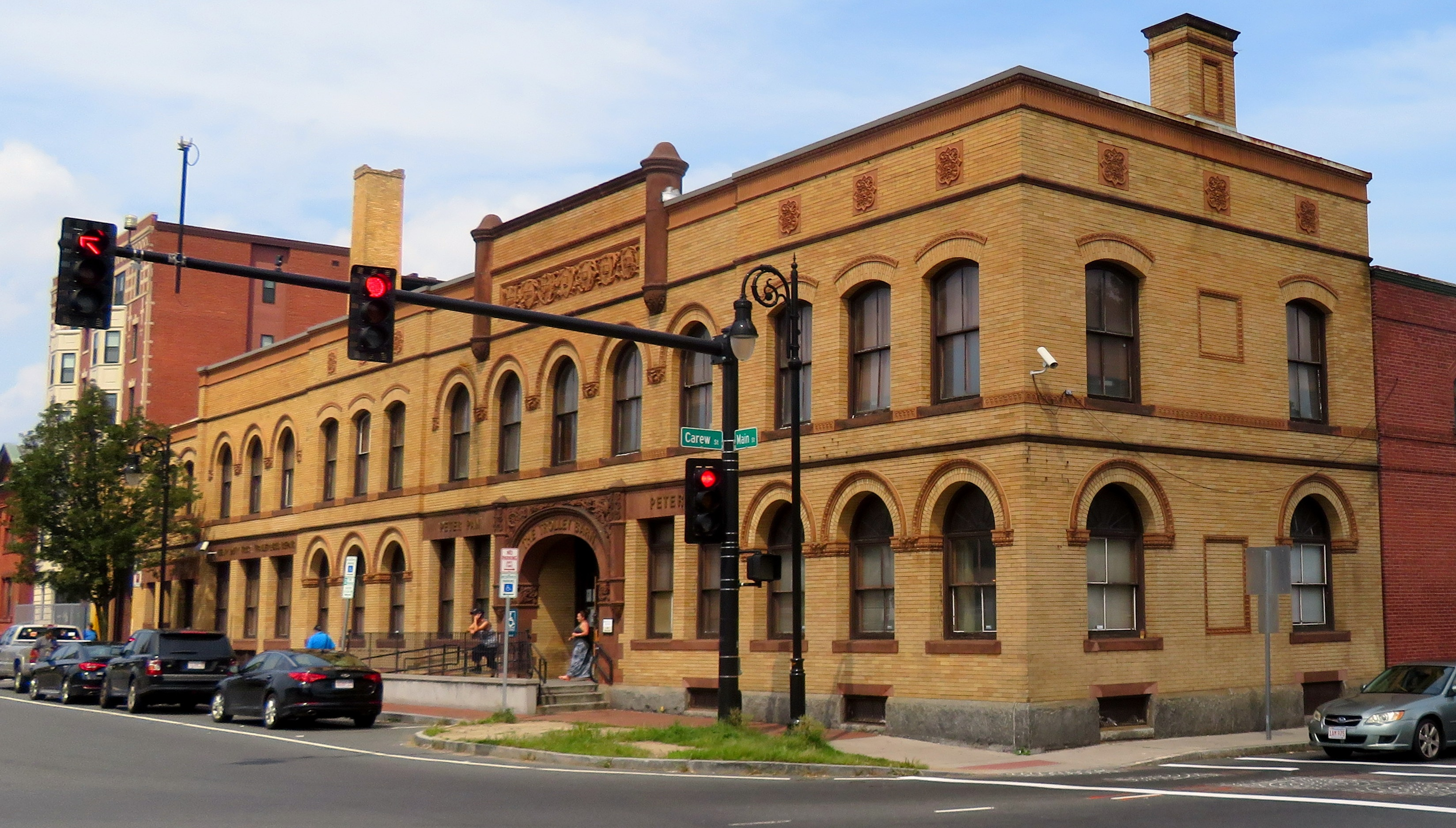
- The 'Trolley Barn', Former Main Street headquarters of the Springfield Street Railway, pictured in 2018.

Overview
- Owner: New York, New Haven & Hartford
- Area served: Greater Springfield: Springfield; Agawam; Chicopee; East Longmeadow; Longmeadow; Ludlow; West Springfield; Westfield Division: Westfield; Russell; Huntington; Palmer Division (former Springfield & Eastern): Palmer; Bondsville; Brimfield; East Brimfield; Monson; Ware; Wilbraham; Through Routes (jointly operated): Holyoke; Northampton; Southbridge; Worcester; Hartford; East Hartford; Thompsonville; Hazardville; Windsor; East Windsor; Windsor Locks; Somers; Suffield
- Transit type: Light rail: Horsecar (1870–1893); Interurban (1891–1940); Bus (1923–1981)
- Annual ridership: 44 million (1916)
- Chief executive: George Atwater (founder)
- Headquarters: 2257 Main Street; Springfield, Massachusetts

Operation
- Began operation: March 10, 1870; June 6, 1890 (electrified); 1923 (bus)
- Ended operation: June 24, 1940 (rail); November 3, 1981 (bus, merged with PVTA)
- Infrastructure managers: Worcester, Holyoke, Northampton and Hartford & Springfield Street Railways (through routes only)
- Character: At-grade, some private rights-of-way.
- Number of vehicles: 500~
- Headway: 12-60 minutes

Technical
- System length: 208+ miles
- Track gauge: 4 ft 8 1/2 in (1,435 mm) standard gauge
System map
Show System Map (greatest extent)

The Springfield Street Railway (SSR) was an interurban streetcar and bus system based in Springfield, Massachusetts that connected the Springfield metropolitan area and the Pioneer Valley, serving over 44 million annual passengers across more than 208 miles of track at the height of its operations, which included through services to the downtown hubs of the Holyoke/Northampton, Worcester Consolidated and Hartford & Springfield Street Railways which it operated jointly with those railways on shared routes, as well as a connection (by transfer) to the Berkshire Street Railway in Huntington at one point.

Shortly after its acquisition by National City Lines in 1939, the Springfield Street Railway's final two tram runs returned to the Trolley Barn for the very last time in the pre-dawn darkness of June 24, 1940. What followed was several decades of municipal bus operation, after which the former railway was formally dissolved in 1984, and absorbed into the PVTA.

== Origins & Expansion ==
Originally founded as an independent horse railway on March 16, 1868 by local businessman George Atwater, the namesake of Springfield's Atwater Park, the Springfield Street Railway Company was not at first taken seriously, with the city's aldermen laughing as they approved its charter, some even making a facetious 11-cent investment in Atwater's venture, which he registered nonetheless.

Track construction would begin by 1869, however the process was complicated by the existence of an at-grade steam railroad crossing on Main Street then used by the Boston & Albany, which vehemently objected to the street railway crossing their tracks. However, despite their earlier skepticism towards the street railway, the city's aldermen overruled the objections of the railroad and allowed construction to proceed.

The first line, which ran from the horse railway's stables (near the present-day PVTA Administration building at 2808 Main) to the intersection of State and Oak Streets, was operational by March 1870. By 1873, a second route had been built which continued from the existing tracks on Main Street to Mill River in the city's South End.

The Springfield Street Railway served over a million passengers for the first time in 1883, though annual ridership would soar by more than 44 times that as a result of the rapid expansion that was to come. In 1887, residents of West Springfield would petition for an extension of the railway across the Connecticut River into their city, one which they would receive within just a few years.

Route Description (1800s)	Color
State Street Line	Yellow Trams
Maple Street Line	Red Trams
South End/Mill River Line	(unknown)
Walnut & King Street Line	White Trams
Worthington Street Line	White Trams
St. James Avenue Line	Blue Trams
Chicopee Falls via Chicopee	Green Trams
West Springfield Line	Orange Trams
Indian Orchard Line	Brown Trams
Tatham Line (via Mittineague)	Tartan Trams

By the time the system was fully electrified (a process begun in 1890), and since at least the 1880s, each of the by then 8+ lines opened before the turn of the century had been color-coded, a practice common at the time among street railways due to the lower rate of literacy in the United States at the time.

By the turn of the century, as further extensions of the now fully electrified system would continue to be planned, built and opened, the Springfield Street Railway's colorful trams were by that point being used so interchangeably on the various different routes that the early color-coded line system was abandoned.

The last horsecar line, the newly built line into West Springfield that had been petitioned for by that city's residents, was electrified by June 1893. By 1895 the Springfield Street Railway's network already included more than 40 miles of track.

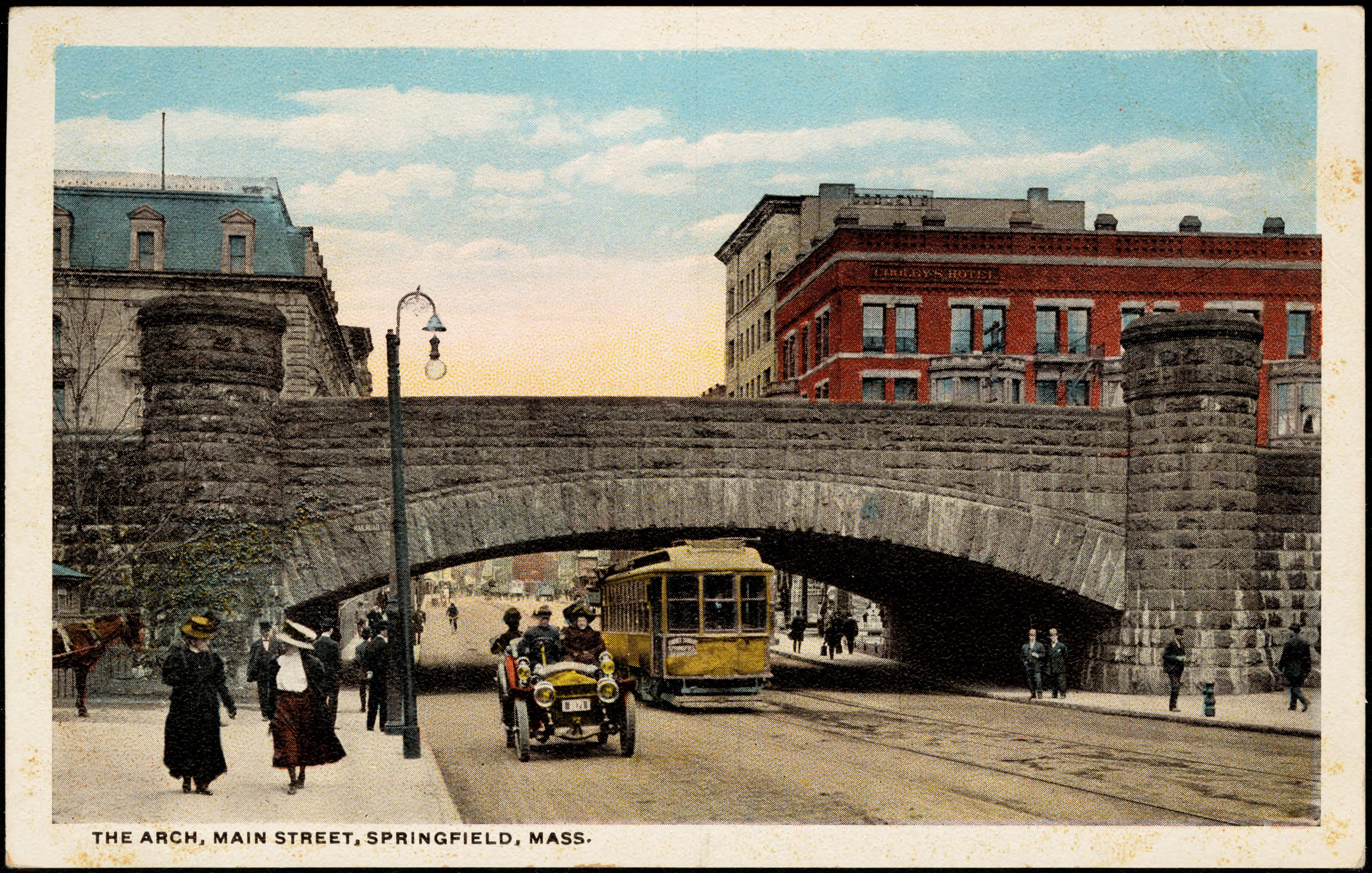
A yellow Springfield tram passes beneath the former Boston & Albany's Main Street Arch.

In 1897, a new auxiliary 'trolley barn' was built for the storage and maintenance of the Springfield Street Railway's growing fleet of electric trams, directly across the street from its Main Street headquarters, the latter of which still stands, unlike the auxiliary trolley barn, which was demolished and is now a gas station.

The vast majority of the SSR's trams were built just over a mile away on Wason Avenue in the Springfield neighborhood of Brightwood by the renowned Wason Manufacturing Company, nationally renowned for crafting some of the most best and most reliable trams on the market.

By 1890 the Springfield's intersection with the Boston & Albany was finally grade-separated with the construction of Springfield's famous 'Main Street Arch' railroad overpass.

== Rivals & Acquisitions ==
=== Palmer & Monson Street Railway / Springfield & Eastern Street Railway ===
See Article: Springfield & Eastern Street Railway

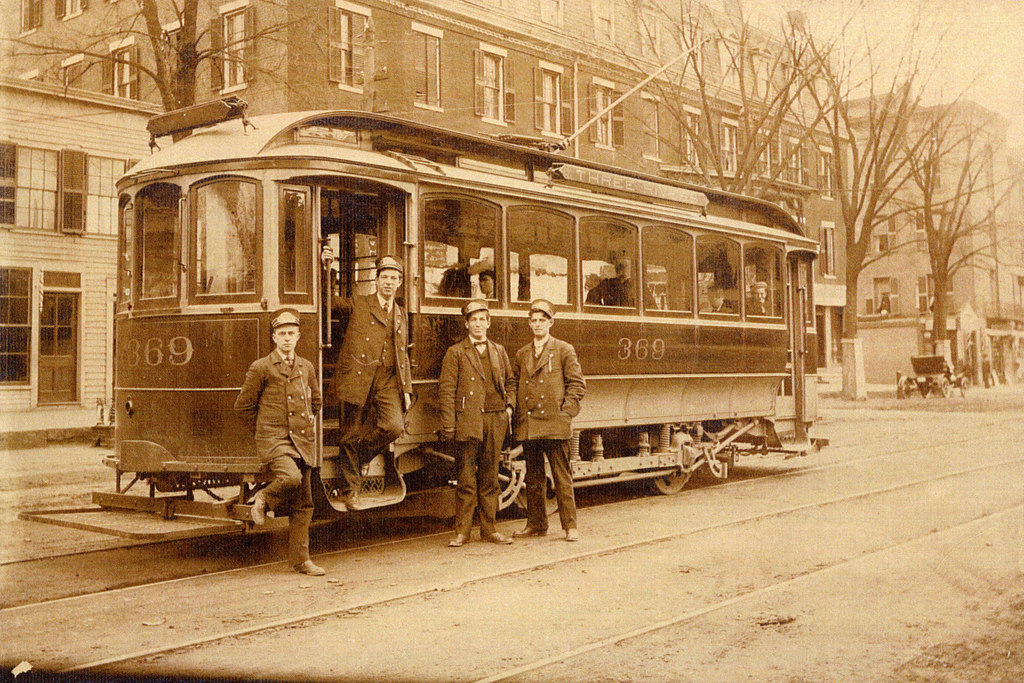
Springfield & Eastern railway workers in downtown Palmer, 1905, the first year of its lease to the Springfield Street Railway. All of these buildings on Main and Walnut streets have been demolished.

East of Springfield, the Palmer & Monson Street Railway Company would receive its charter on May 10, 1897 and quickly set about construction of a new electric railway, which would enter service within a year of incorporation, three years before the Springfield Street Railway would finish electrifying its own routes.

By July 1900, the Palmer & Monson had completed the interurban tram line from downtown Palmer to Main Street in Ware along a fast, mostly grade-separated private right-of-way through the Palmer neighborhood of Whipples.

By the time the Palmer & Monson renamed itself the Springfield & Eastern Street Railway on June 5, 1901, the company had built and was already operating multiple interurban tram lines from Ware and Palmer to Bondsville, Three Rivers and of course, Monson.

That same year, the Springfield & Eastern would also build a line through North Wilbraham to the Ludlow-Springfield bridge, where it connected with the existing tracks of the Springfield Street Railway's Indian Orchard line.

Attempts to extend the Springfield & Eastern's own tracks into Springfield proper were made through at least December 1904, but were ultimately rejected by the city's board of aldermen, who by the turn of the century had learned to take the rapidly expanding Springfield Street Railway much more seriously, and were presumably warding off the potential competition on its behalf at that point.

The following year, any pretense of rivalry was given up, and the Springfield & Eastern Street Railway was leased to the Springfield Street Railway in 1905. In 1910, that lease would become permanent, and the former Springfield & Eastern would become the new Palmer Division of the Springfield Street Railway following its official absorption into the Springfield on November 6 of that year.

=== Ware & Brookfield Street Railway / Worcester & Warren Street Railway ===
See Articles: Ware & Brookfield Street Railway & Warren, Brookfield & Spencer Street Railway

In Ware, the Springfield's line connected with the Ware & Brookfield Street Railway on Main Street, which, along with the Worcester & Warren Street Railway (as the Warren, Brookfield and Spencer Street Railway was known in its final years) operated the other tram lines in Ware and neighboring towns.

While at one point, the Springfield Street Railway had made use of the Ware & Brookfield's tracks for an early route to Worcester requiring multiple transfers (not shown), and also operated trolley express (freight) service using its tracks, neither the Ware & Brookfield nor the Worcester & Warren would ultimately be absorbed into the larger Springfield Street Railway interurban system. Both remained independent until ceasing operations more or less simultaneously in early 1918, at least in part due to wartime austerity.

=== Woronoco Street Railway ===
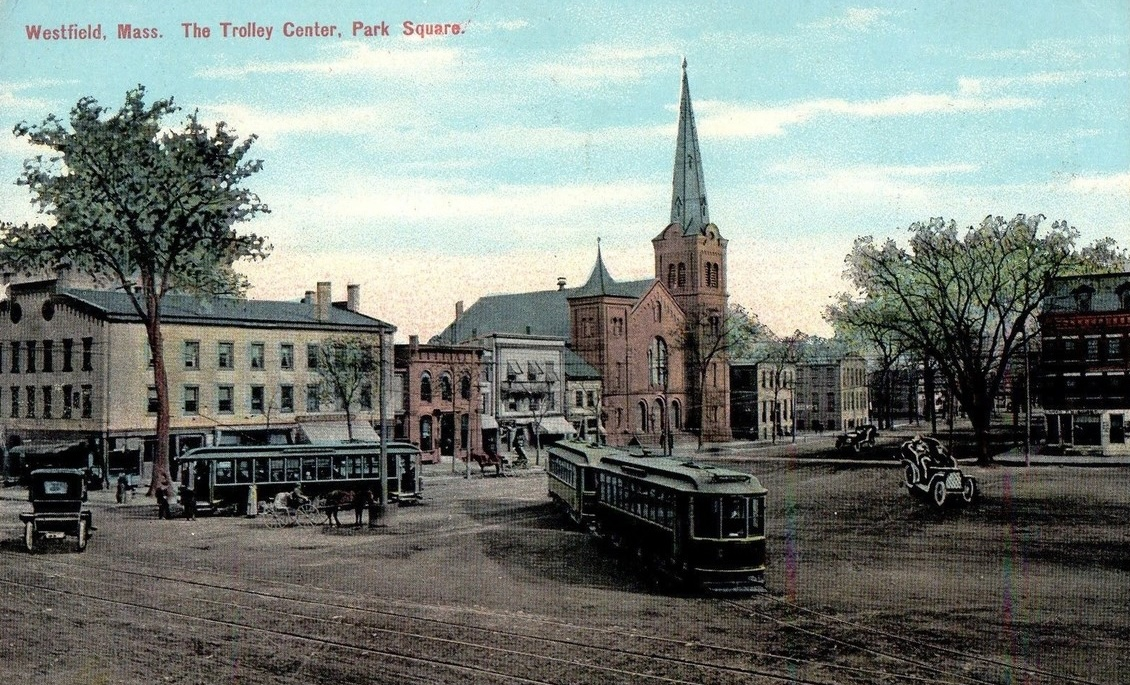
Trams in the Westfield Historic District around 1910, by which time the Woronoco, Highland and Western Massachusetts Street Railways had all been consolidated into the Springfield Street Railway's new Westfield Division.

Meanwhile, at the time the Springfield Street Railway was being electrified around 1891, across the river in Westfield, horse railways were still going strong. A new horse railroad had been chartered as the Woronoco Street Railway Company and opened in 1891, after constructing a new horsecar line from its stables and future trolley shed at 265 North Elm (still standing today) to Court Square in the present-day Westfield Center Historic District.

=== Highland Street Railway ===
By March 6, 1894, another local horsecar operation, the Highland Street Railway Company, had taken it upon itself to construct tracks from the terminus of the Woronoco Street Railway near Court Square to what was then "Woronoco Park", a popular horse racetrack directly east of present-day Highland Elementary School (today a residential neighborhood), after the Woronoco had refused to do so.

The Woronoco, which was by then already using self-propelled experimental trams powered by compressed-air on its route(s), subsequently also refused to allow the horse railway, the last of its kind formed in Massachusetts, to use its tracks, and the government refused to intervene. Within a year, however, the two companies would merge, and by 1895, the older and now larger Woronoco Street Railway, would absorb the little Highland and its two miles of track, after which the combined system was electrified in short order.

=== Western Massachusetts Street Railway ===
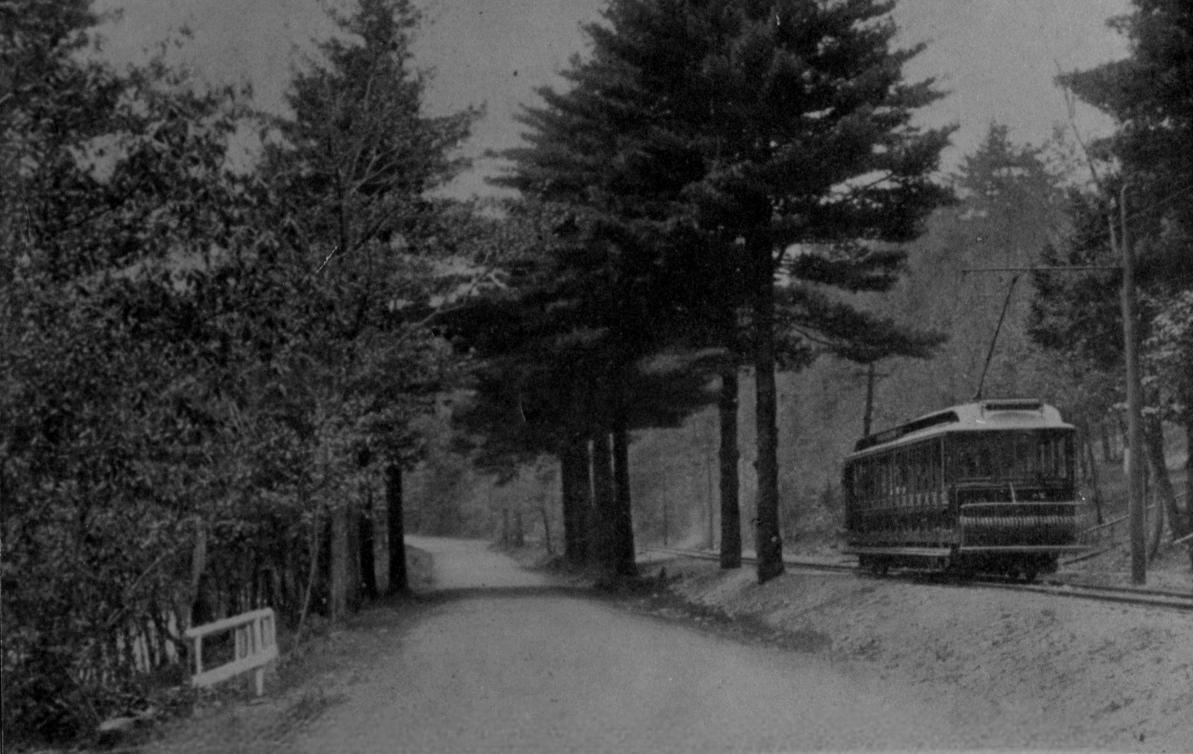
Western Massachusetts Street Railway tram on route to Russell, Massachusetts from Westfield near present-day Route 20 circa 1906.

By 1902, the Western Massachusetts Street Railway Company (WMSR), a third would-be street railway operation in the Westfield area, had been described in the press, and had existed informally and granted franchises at some point as part of an ongoing effort to connect Westfield (and ultimately Springfield) with the Berkshire Street Railway in Lee, and thus to Pittsfield.

That task was ultimately divided between the Berkshire, which would complete the line from Lee to Huntington more than a decade later, and the newly former WMSR, which was formally organized on December 10, 1904, after which it rapidly began construction of a ten-mile route between Westfield and Russell, Massachusetts via the neighborhood of Woronoco (ironically not one of those served by the earlier Woronoco Street Railway) which opened as an already fully-electrified line by 1905, with plans to extend the route further west along its chartered route to Lee via Huntington.

These ambitions were realized by Spring 1907, when the line to Huntington was opened. But before the Western Massachusetts Street Railway had been operational for a full year, it was leased in its entirety to the Woronoco Street Railway. However, the WMSR subsequently proceeded to petitioned for and was granted permission to absorb its former lessor, and on April 26, 1907 it did exactly that.

Due to the more rugged terrain between Lee and Huntington, the Berkshire Street Railway's portion of the Berkshire-Springfield route, which became known as "The Huckleberry Line", that would connect with what, by the time of its completion, had become the Springfield Street Railway's Westfield-Huntington route, due to the Berkshire's line taking until August 17, 1917 to complete and open for service, at which time the Westfield-Huntington route had been open for 10 years. This was because on November 30, 1909, all three Westfield-area tram systems had been officially absorbed by the Springfield Street Railway, and from that point became the SSR's newly formed Westfield Division.

It was no accident that the Springfield, Berkshire and Worcester interurban systems all shared the same consolidated ownership. By the time it acquired the three consolidated Westfield companies, the Springfield Street Railway, along with most of the street railways in the region, had already been under the control of the New York, New Haven and Hartford Railroad for some time, at least two years in the Springfield's case, through one New Haven holding company or another.

== Acquisition by National City Lines & Abandonment of Streetcar Lines ==
Logo of National City Lines, Inc.

While several streetcar lines had been "motorized" or abandoned and converted to bus service before 1939, in June of that year it was reported that City Coach Lines, a holding company for the infamous Chicago based National City Lines, had acquired a controlling interest in the Springfield Street Railway from the floundering New York, New Haven and Hartford Railroad, which had previously owned the street railway.

Further, in July of that same year, it become known that The Omnibus Corporation, today known as the private auto rental giant Hertz Global Holdings, had been involved in the transaction and would have some influence as to the fate of the Springfield Street Railway and its remaining trolley lines, the role of John A. Ritchie, the President of Omnibus and a Director of National City Lines, and the involvement of National City Lines altogether having been deliberately withheld from the public prior to reporting by the Springfield Republican.

The Republican stated that, at the time the so-called 'reorganization' was announced, that "no mention was made of any possible affiliations with a larger holding company than the City Coach Lines, and locally every attempt to obtain further information on the ownership of the local utility has been blocked by evasive answers and downright denials."

A new holding company called Springfield Associates, wholly controlled and owned by National City Lines (through National City Coach) was incorporated in Massachusetts for the purpose of managing the operations of the Springfield Street Railway's "transition to buses". While the new management had assured a "gradual" transition to bus service (and no significant staffing changes), within a year the Springfield Street Railway was a railway in name only, all remaining rail lines having been abandoned before 1941.

By 1955, National City Lines and the executives such as Hiram L. Bollum and others that its subsidiaries City Coach Company via Springfield Associates had inserted as company leadership, had brought the company to ruins, Bollum himself threatening the Mayor of Springfield that the Springfield Street Railway Company might end even the meager bus service it had substituted in place of the formerly robust regional light rail system. Thus, numerous Western Massachusetts cities and towns were thrown into a genuine, albeit manufactured, transportation crisis, and many of those served by the Springfield Street Railway Company sought new companies to operate bus service, and eventually, public ownership.

Springfield Associates (along with City Coach Lines, not long after) was terminated in 1940, but the management of the former Springfield Street Railway Company remained largely unchanged, with key National City Lines figures such as Hiram L. Bollum, Wheelock Whitney Jr., John A. Ritchie and others remaining involved in the former railway's leadership and board until at least the mid 1950's, with the former railway company earning its shareholders, including those same executives, returns on investment of over 800 times the share value National City Lines had acquired the railway company for in the 1930s. While running the Springfield Street Railway and many similar companies into the ground at an operational level, National City Lines shareholders had simultaneously made themselves fabulously wealthy.

Contemporaneous reporting by the Springfield Republican and explicit statements by officials involved in National City Lines that the intention even prior to acquiring the Springfield Street Railway was for the express purpose of "motorization", i.e. to earn a profit by liquidating the railway assets and converting them to bus-only services that would purchase buses from National City Lines owned and associated companies such as White Bus Lines and GM's Yellow Coach Company, directly contradicts arguments made by scholarly articles denying the existence of the General Motors streetcar conspiracy, many of which argue that National City Lines, Pierre S. du Pont and other shareholders played no direct role in the near-total obliteration of early light rail in the United States, yet the very officials of the company GM, Standard Oil (ExxonMobil) and peers such as Firestone and Omnibus (Hertz) controlled openly asserted that their acquisition of trolley systems such as Springfield's was for exactly that purpose at the time it was happening, and even beforehand.

Indeed, the 'self-dealing' involved in the vertically integrated sale of buses to former street railways acquired by National City Lines and its subsidiaries, just one of several components of the auto-industry holding company's multi-pronged transportation business operations, was the subject of a United States government prosecution in United States v. National City Lines, et al., wherein Wheelock Whitney Jr. himself, among other National City Lines executives, stood trial for the same.

National City Lines and its associates were found guilty and the verdict upheld on appeal.
