= Northampton Street Railway =

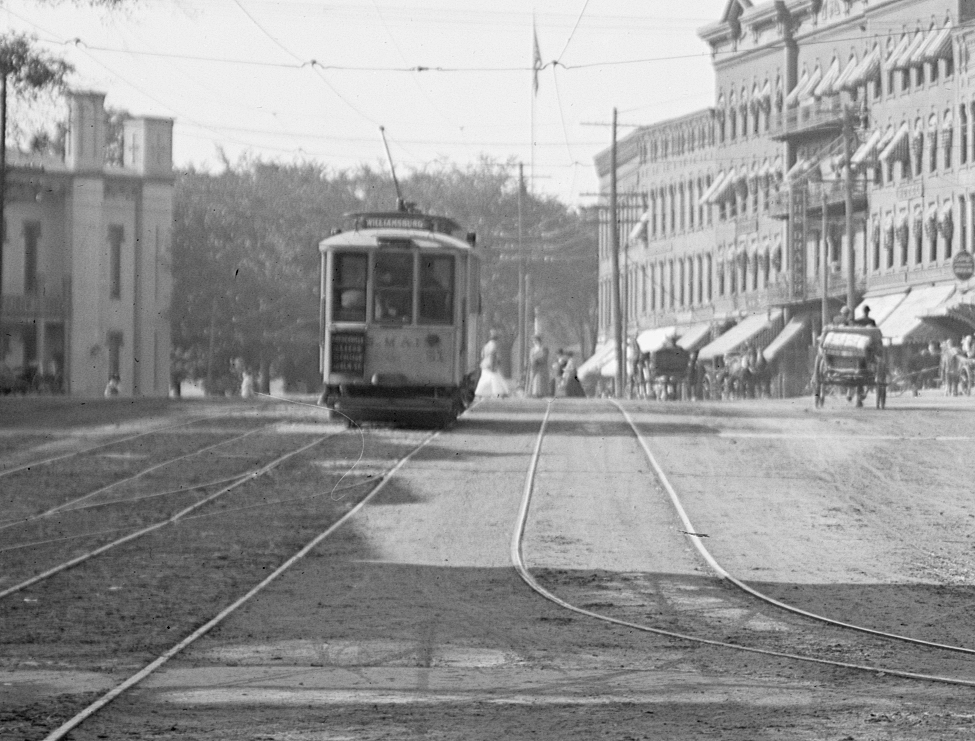
- A Northampton Street Railway car on Main Street, 1907

Overview
- Owner: Northampton Street Railway Company
- Area served: Northampton; Florence; Leeds; Williamsburg; Easthampton; Mount Tom; Holyoke; Springfield; Amherst; Hadley; Hatfield
- Transit type: Light rail: Horsecar (1866–1893); Interurban (1893–1933); Bus (1933–1951)
- Headquarters: 125 Locust Street; Northampton, MA; 01060-2066

Operation
- Began operation: September 8, 1866; August 26, 1893 (electrified); 1933 (bus)
- Ended operation: December 25, 1933 (rail); August 22, 1951 (bus) (Note: AFL strike began August 22, 1951. Company yielded routes and franchise- October 30, 1951.)

Technical
- Track gauge: 4 ft 8 1/2 in (1,435 mm) standard gauge

The Northampton Street Railway (NSR), founded as the Northampton and Williamsburg Street Railway, was an interurban streetcar and bus system operating in Northampton, Massachusetts and its villages of Florence and Leeds, as well as surrounding communities with connections in Amherst, Easthampton, Hadley, Hatfield and Williamsburg. For a time, there also was through service from Northampton to both Holyoke and Springfield, operated jointly with the Holyoke and Springfield Street Railways.

In 1903, the Northampton Street Railway merged with the Greenfield & Deerfield Street Railway to form the Greenfield, Deerfield & Northampton Street Railway, which, only two years later was acquired by the Northampton & Amherst Street Railway, subsequently renamed the Connecticut Valley Street Railway.

Ultimately a prolonged labor strike beginning in August 1951, led to the company ceasing all services and relinquishing its routes and franchise later that year. Following its bankruptcy, several of the railway company's former bus routes were assumed by Western Massachusetts Bus Lines. Purchased two years after the company ceased operations, today the railway's former headquarters serves as the main garage of the Northampton Department of Public Works.
