= West Brookfield (CDP), Massachusetts =

West Brookfield, Massachusetts
- Census-designated place
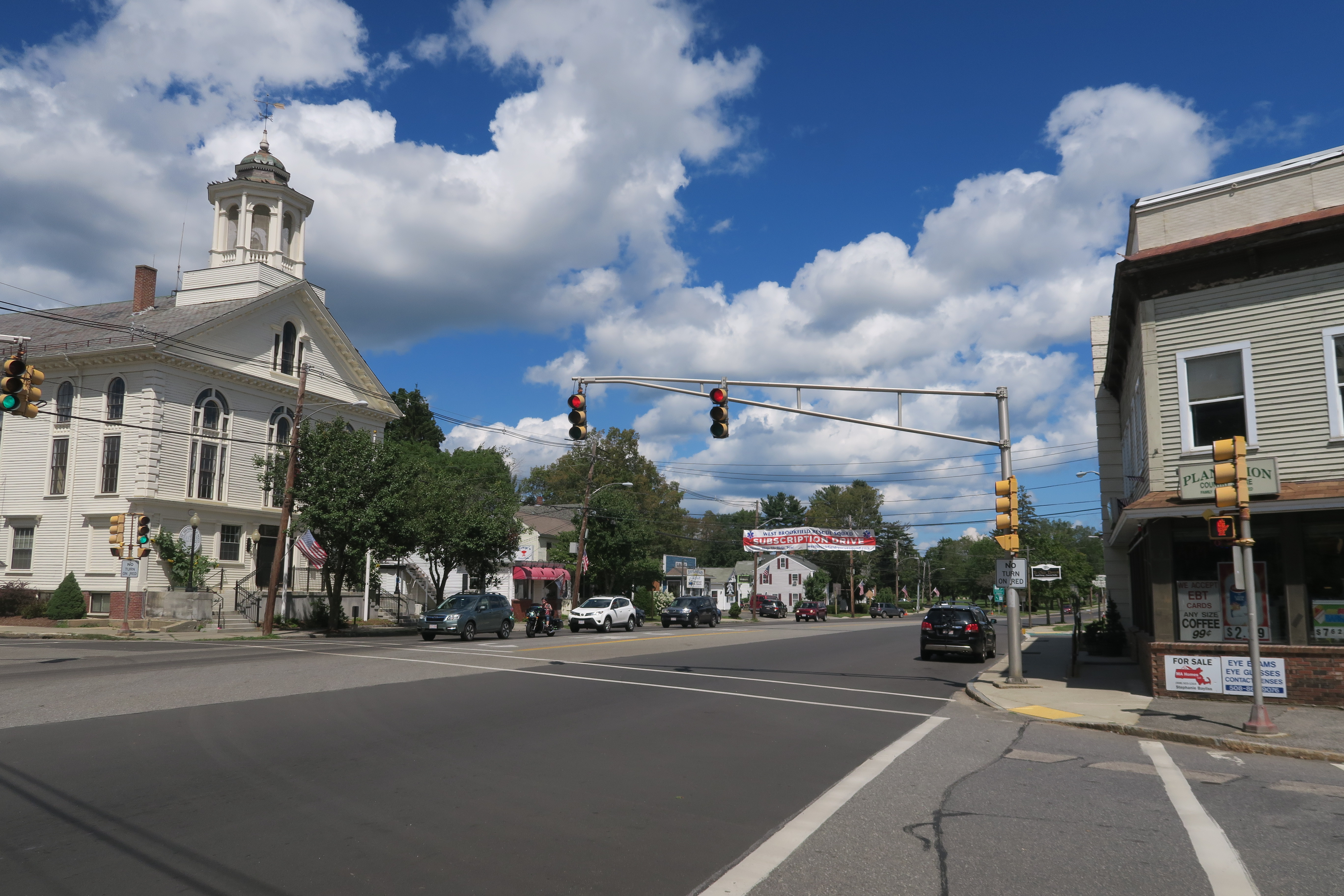
- Main Street

- Location in Worcester County and the state of Massachusetts.
- Coordinates: 42°14′8″N 72°8′46″W
- Country: United States
- State: Massachusetts
- County: Worcester

Area
  - Total: 1.77 sq mi (4.58 km^{2})
  - Land: 1.26 sq mi (3.27 km^{2})
  - Water: 0.51 sq mi (1.31 km^{2})
- Elevation: 627 ft (191 m)

Population (2020)
  - Total: 1,375
  - Density: 1,088.8/sq mi (420.37/km^{2})
- Time zone: UTC-5 (Eastern (EST))
  - Summer (DST): UTC-4 (EDT)
- ZIP code: 01585
- Area code: 508
- FIPS code: 25-75365
- GNIS feature ID: 0609864

West Brookfield is a census-designated place (CDP) in the town of West Brookfield in Worcester County, Massachusetts, United States. The population was 1,413 at the 2010 census.

== Geography ==
According to the United States Census Bureau, the CDP has a total area of 4.5 km^{2} (1.7 mi^{2}), of which 3.2 km^{2} (1.2 mi^{2}) is land and 1.3 km^{2} (0.5 mi^{2}) (29.31%) is water.

== Demographics ==
Historical population
Census	Pop.	Note	%±
2020	1,375		—
U.S. Decennial Census

As of the census of 2000, there were 1,610 people, 581 households, and 348 families residing in the CDP. The population density was 501.3/km^{2} (1,301.3/mi^{2}). There were 656 housing units at an average density of 204.3/km^{2} (530.2/mi^{2}). The racial makeup of the CDP was 98.26% White, 0.25% Native American, 0.25% Asian, 0.06% Pacific Islander, and 1.18% from two or more races. Hispanic or Latino of any race were 0.50% of the population.

There were 581 households, out of which 26.2% had children under the age of 18 living with them, 47.8% were married couples living together, 9.0% had a female householder with no husband present, and 40.1% were non-families. 34.8% of all households were made up of individuals, and 17.0% had someone living alone who was 65 years of age or older. The average household size was 2.19 and the average family size was 2.84.

In the CDP, the population was spread out, with 17.0% under the age of 18, 4.7% from 18 to 24, 21.4% from 25 to 44, 21.1% from 45 to 64, and 35.8% who were 65 years of age or older. The median age was 50 years. For every 100 females, there were 68.2 males. For every 100 females age 18 and over, there were 62.5 males.

The median income for a household in the CDP was $41,875, and the median income for a family was $52,292. Males had a median income of $37,167 versus $27,692 for females. The per capita income for the CDP was $20,712. About 3.3% of families and 7.4% of the population were below the poverty line, including 12.2% of those under age 18 and 5.1% of those age 65 or over.

== Gallery ==
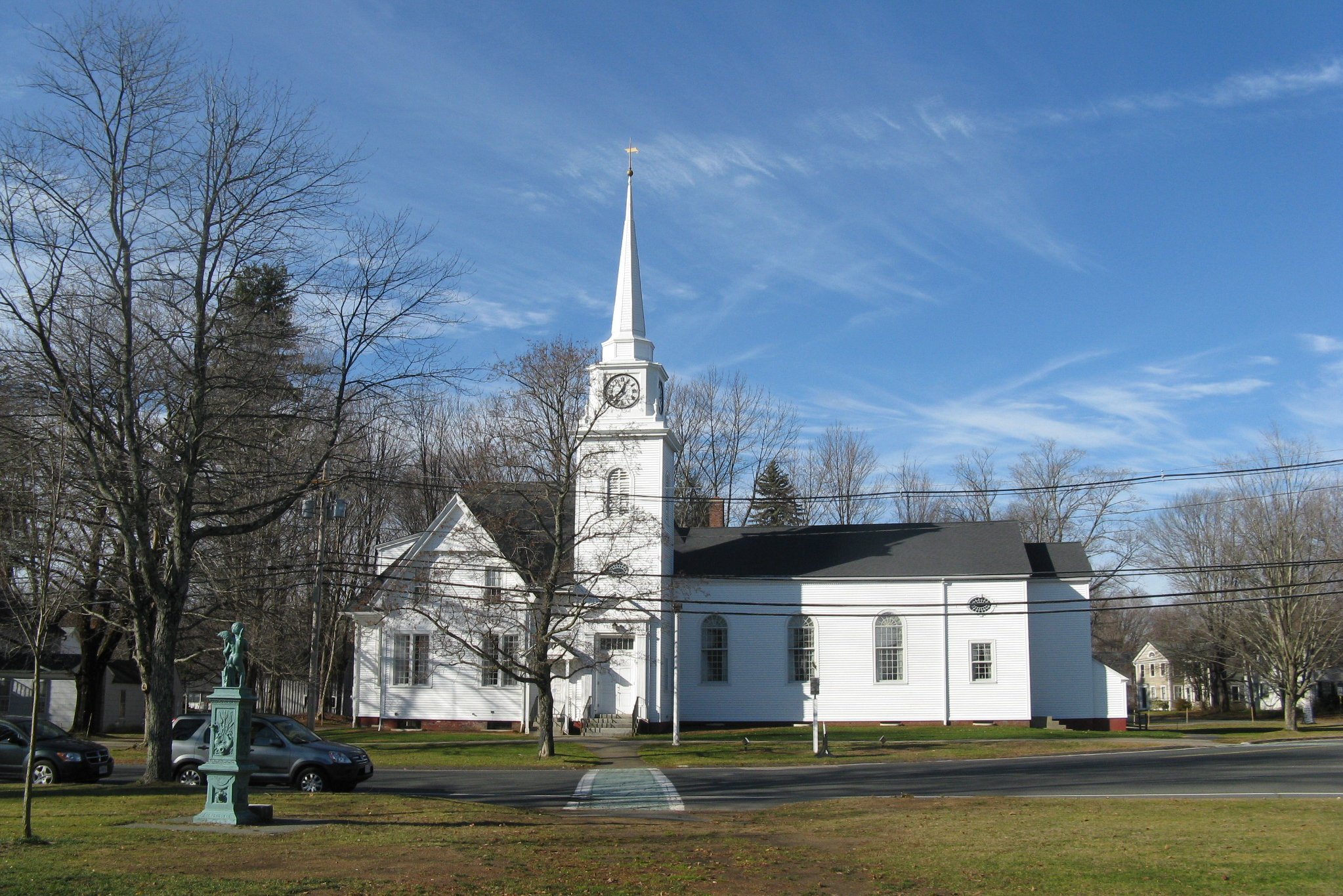
First Congregational Church

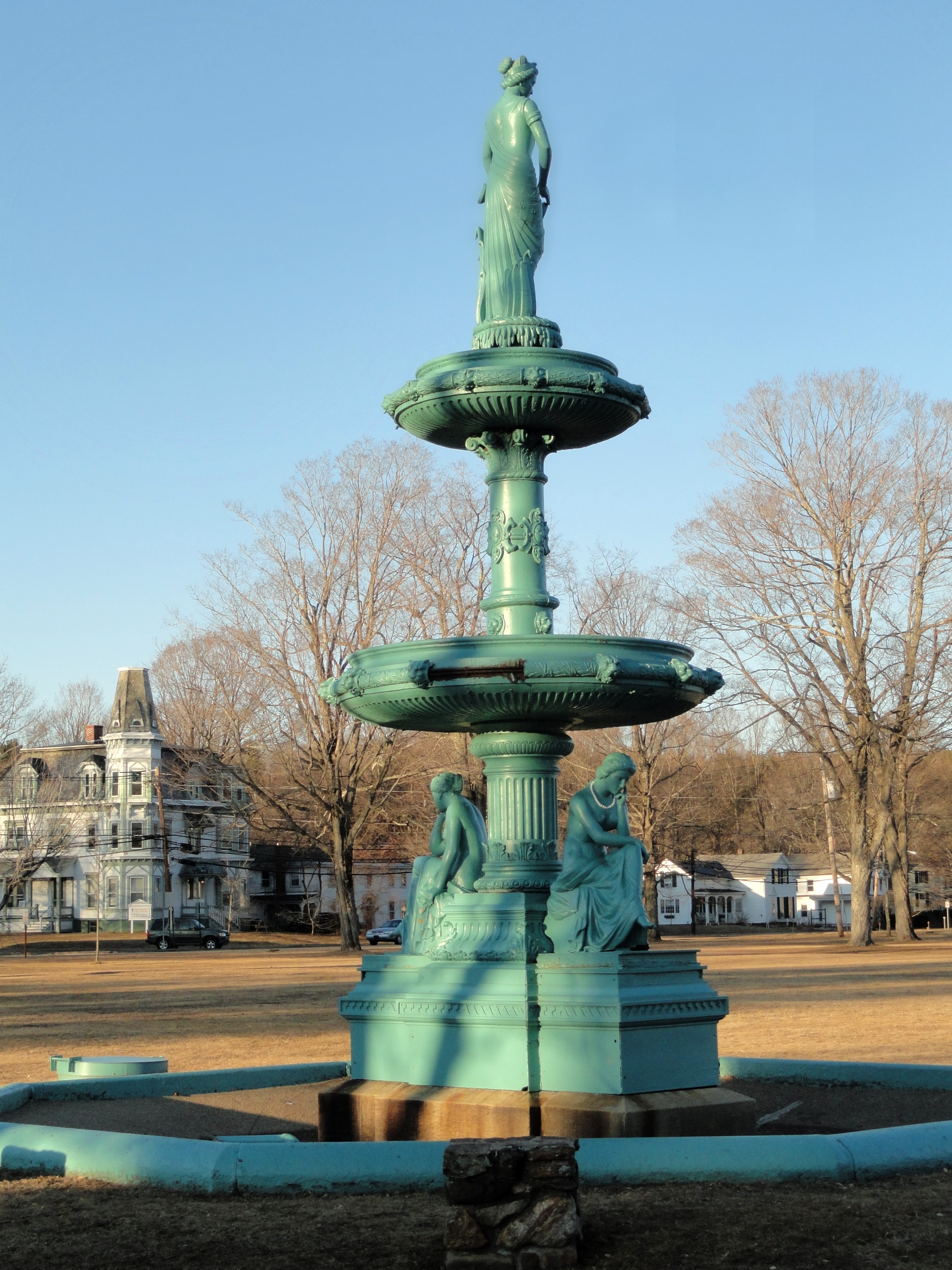
Rice Memorial Fountain

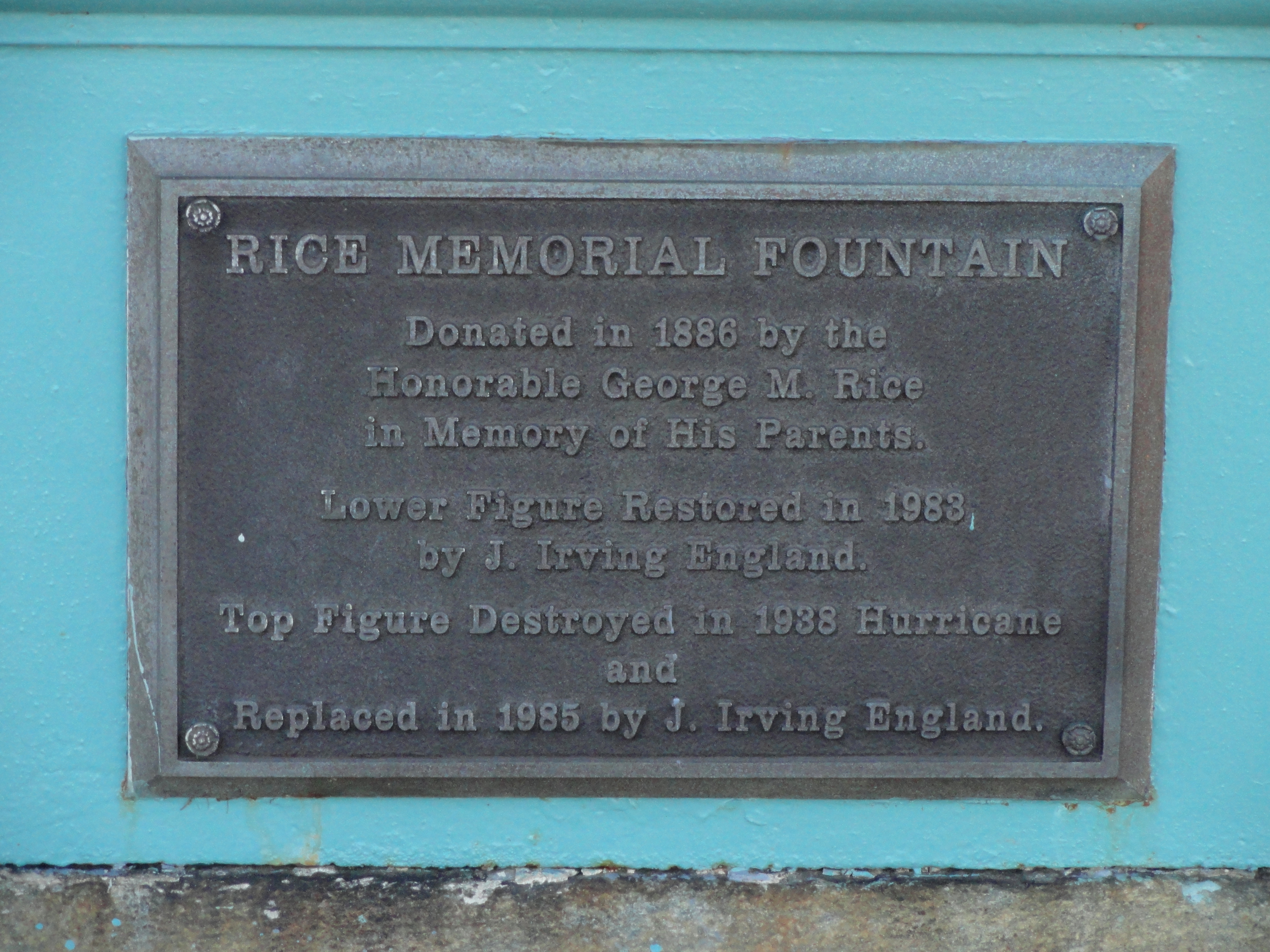
Rice Memorial Fountain - plaque

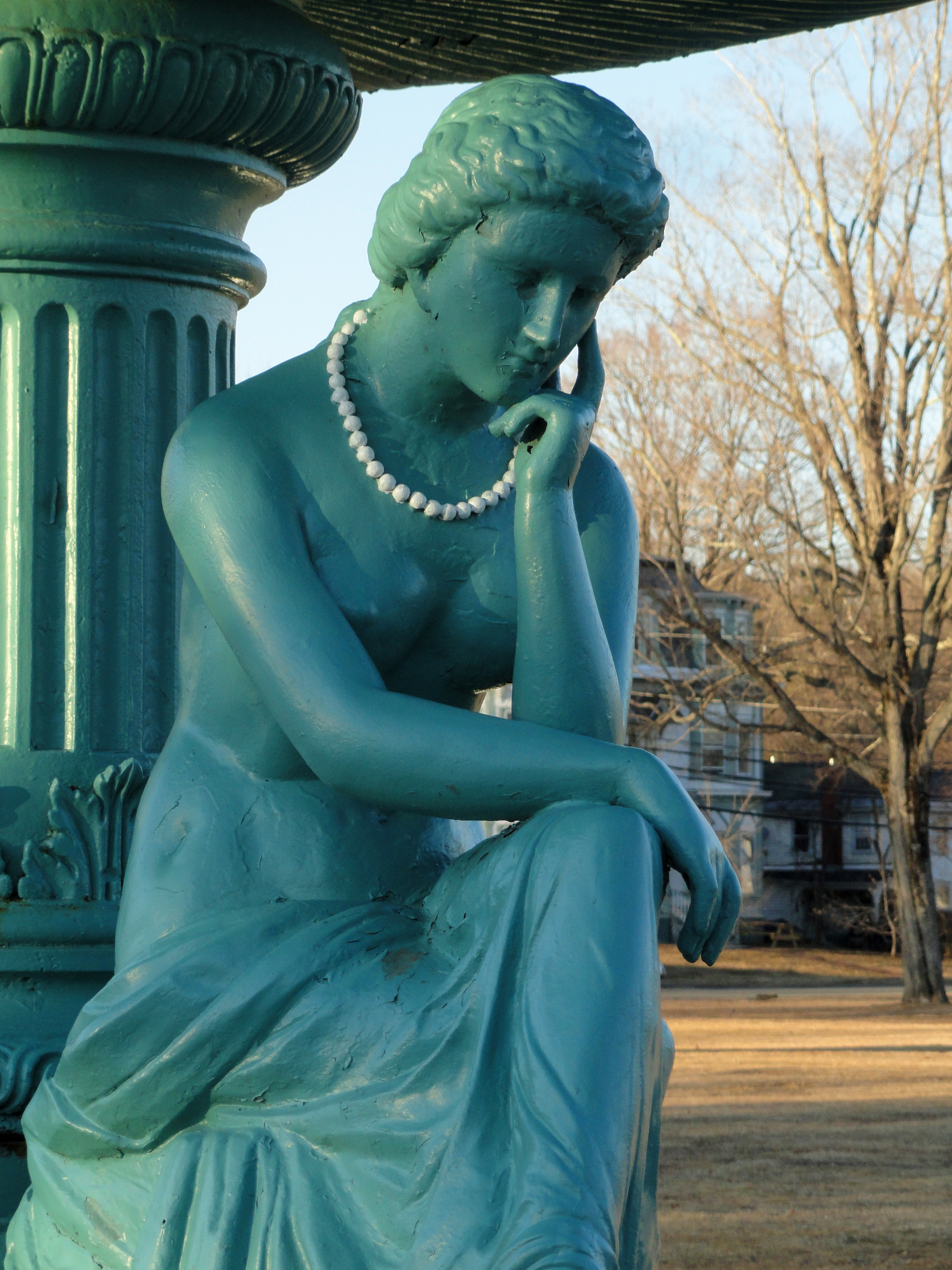
Rice Memorial Fountain - figure at base

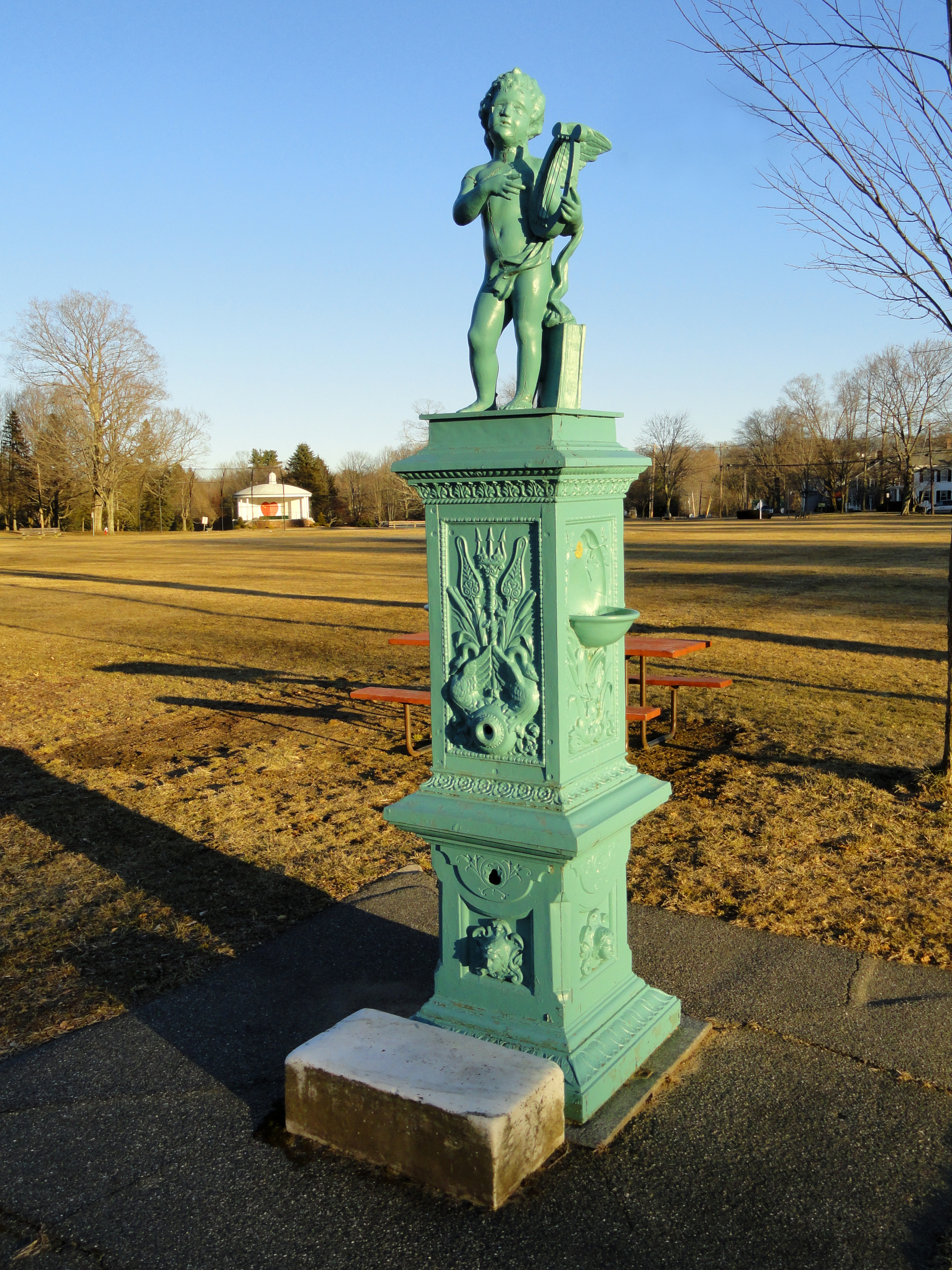
Cupid Fountain

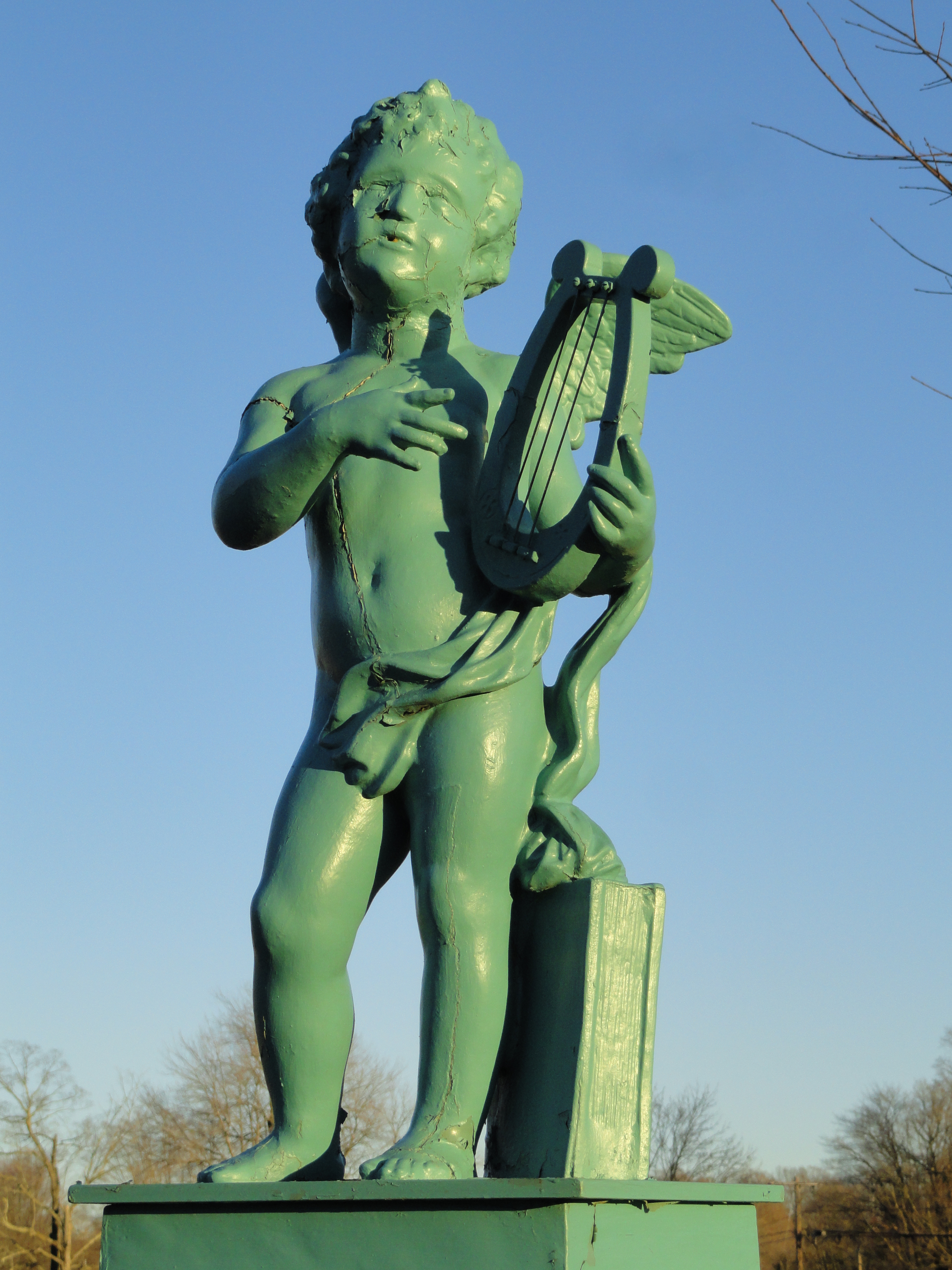
Cupid Fountain - Cupid figure

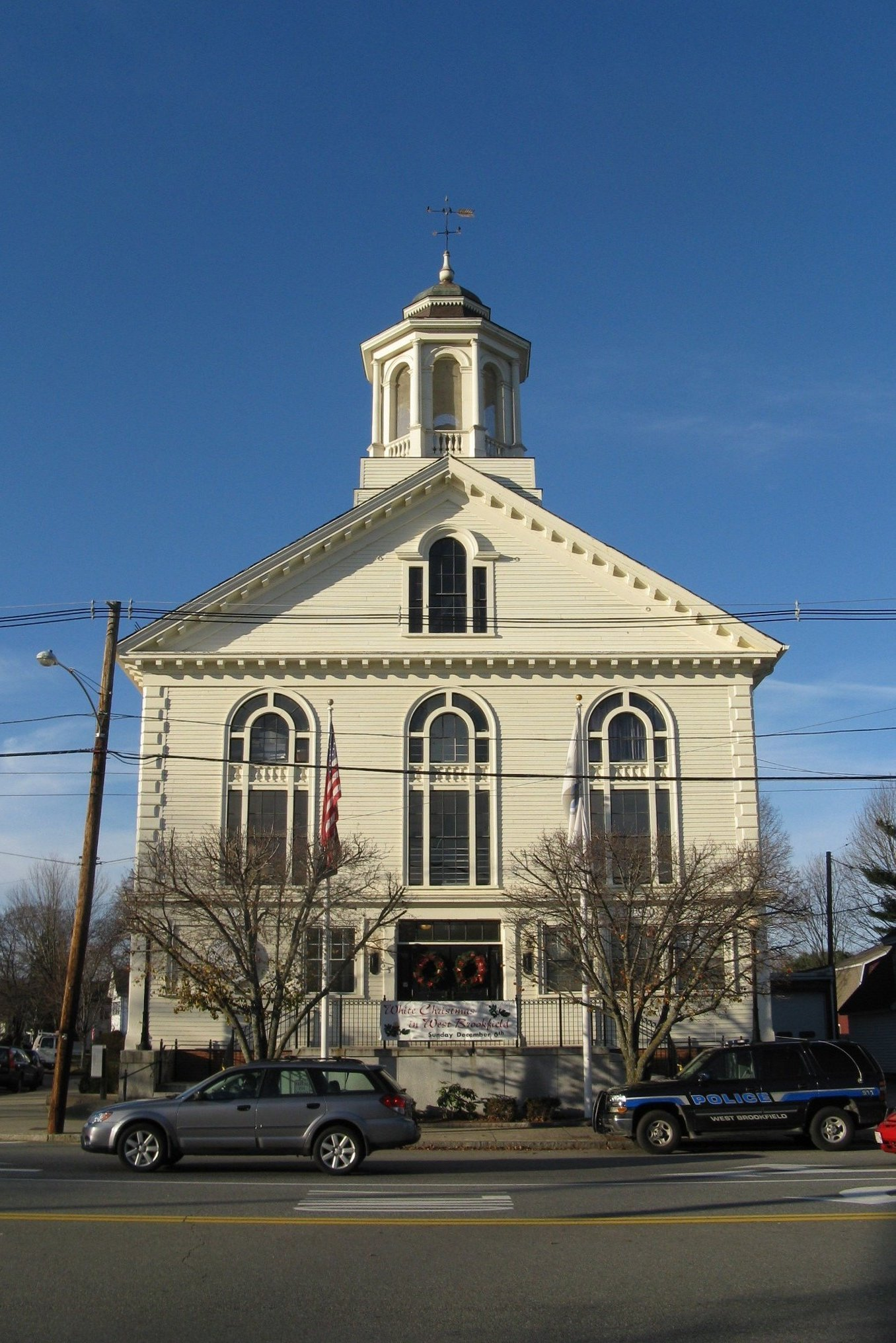
Town Hall

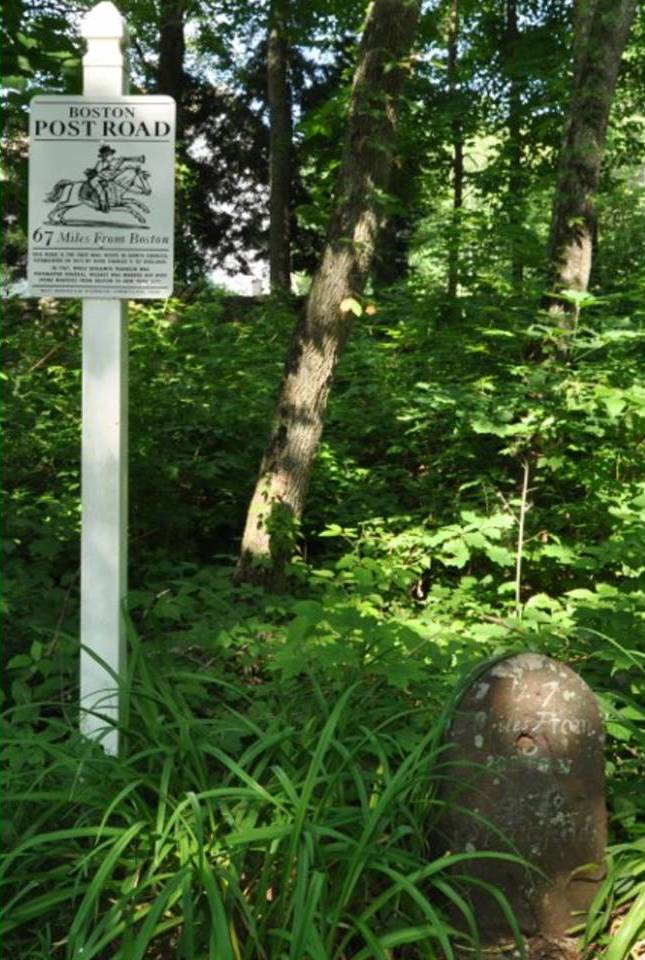
Milestone marking 67 miles from Boston

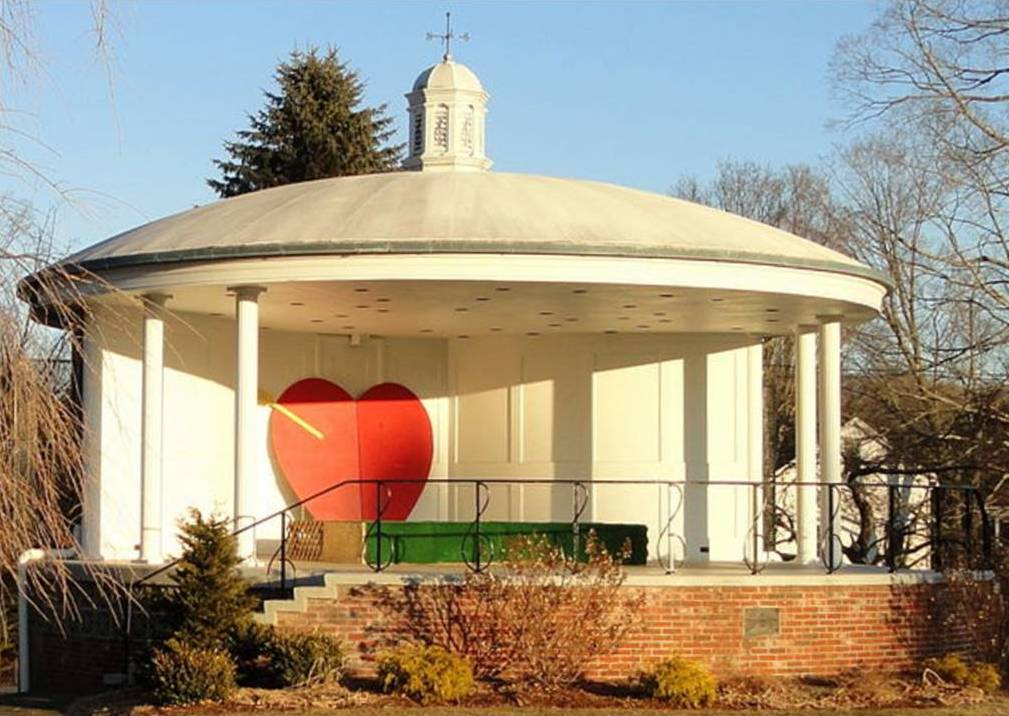
Helen Shackley bandstand
