= Warren, Brookfield and Spencer Street Railway =

Streetcar company in Massachusetts

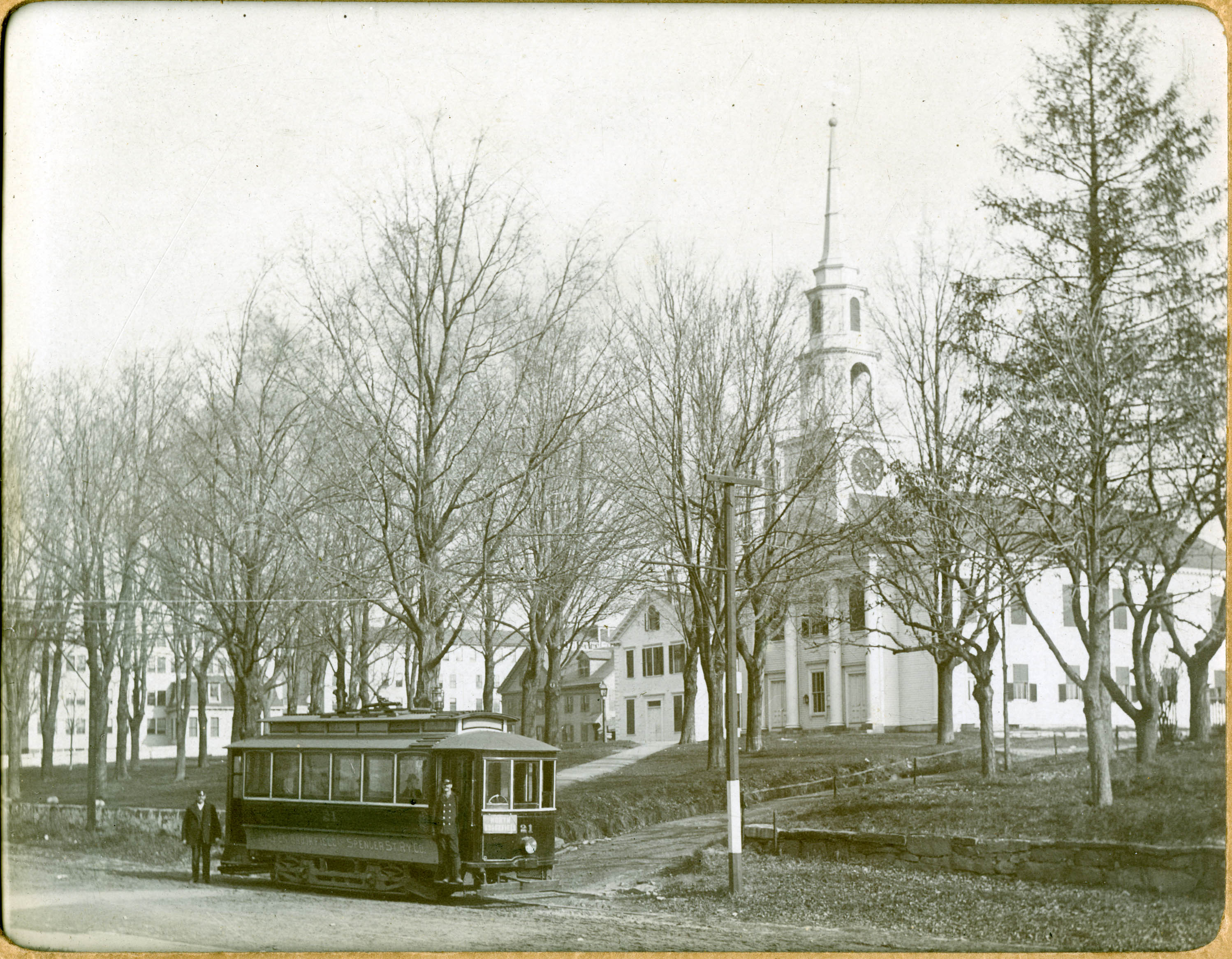
Streetcar in North Brookfield

The Warren, Brookfield and Spencer Street Railway is a former Massachusetts streetcar company that ran between Warren, and Spencer, Massachusetts in the United States, and passing through West Brookfield, Brookfield, and East Brookfield. Service began in 1896, and ran until around 1917, when service from the Worcester, Brookfield and Spencer Street Railway Company came to town. Other factors contributing to its closure included wartime shortages of coal and a car barn fire, the damage of which was estimated to be around $75,000.
