= West Brookfield, Massachusetts =

- Town
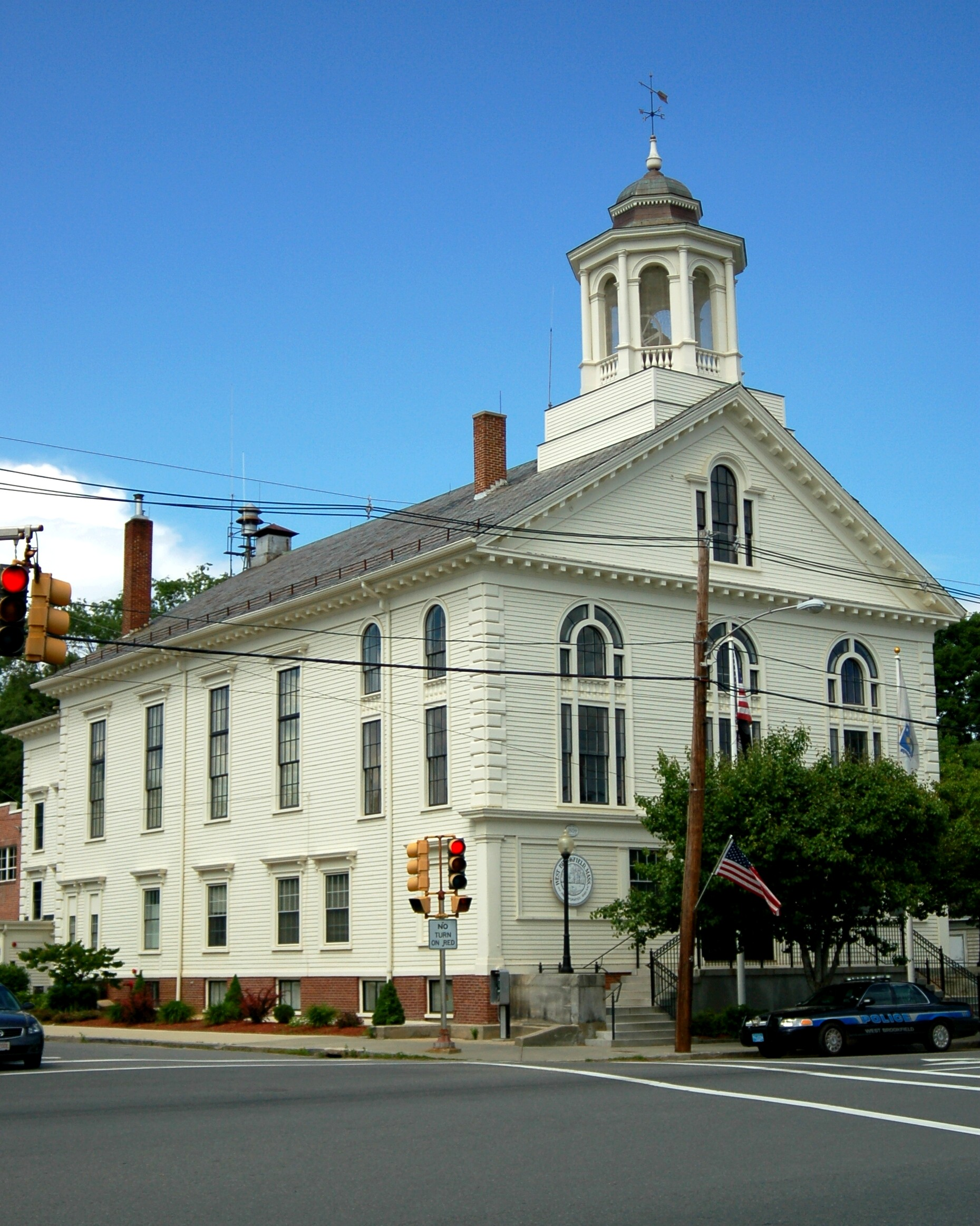
- Town Hall

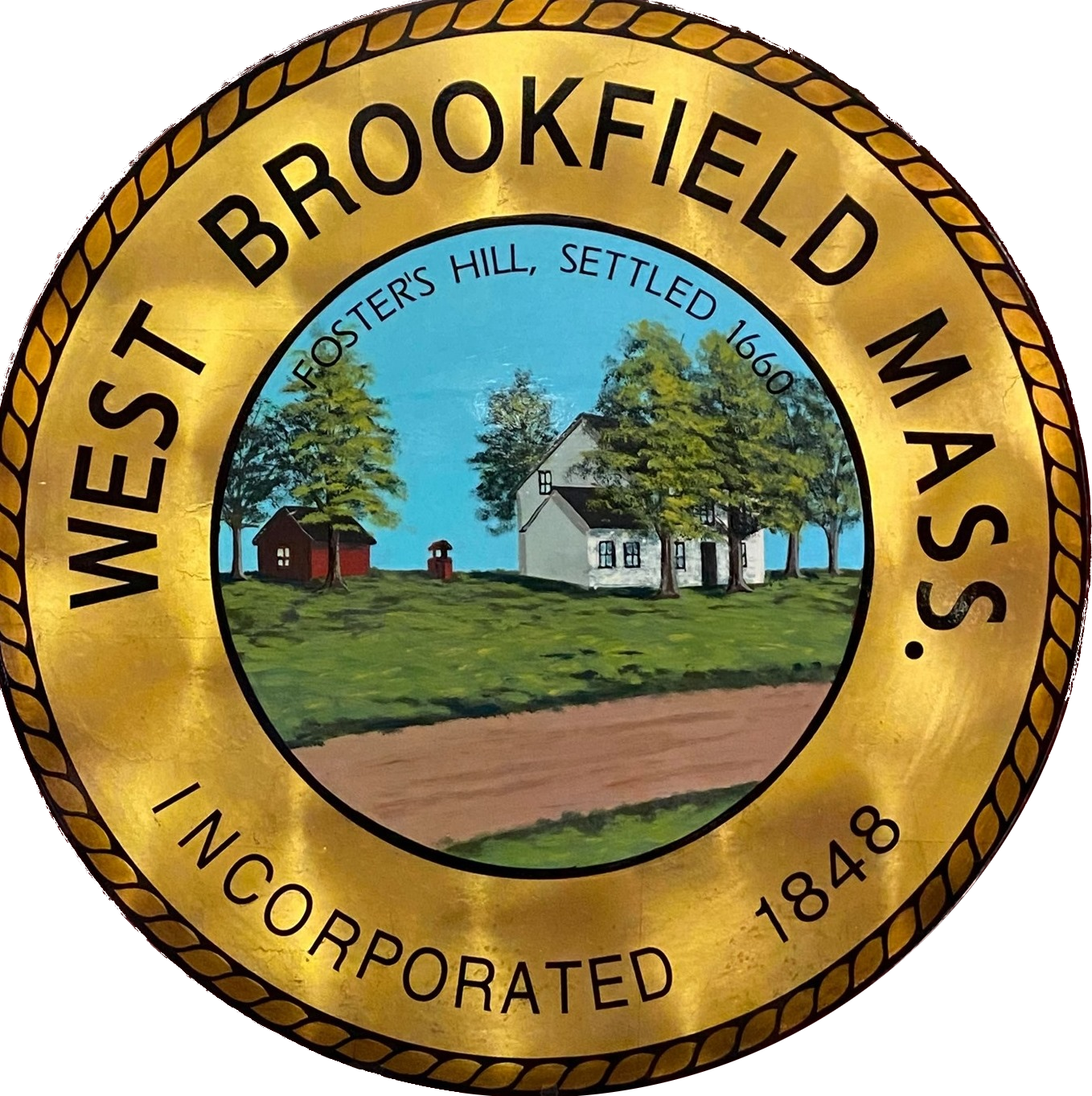
- Seal

- Location in Worcester County and the state of Massachusetts.
- Coordinates: 42°14′07″N 72°08′30″W
- Country: United States
- State: Massachusetts
- County: Worcester
- Settled: 1664
- Incorporated: 1848

Government
  - Type: Open town meeting

Area
  - Total: 21.1 sq mi (54.7 km^{2})
  - Land: 20.5 sq mi (53.0 km^{2})
  - Water: 0.66 sq mi (1.7 km^{2})
- Elevation: 633 ft (193 m)

Population (2020)
  - Total: 3,833
  - Density: 187/sq mi (72.3/km^{2})
- Time zone: UTC−5 (Eastern)
  - Summer (DST): UTC−4 (Eastern)
- ZIP Code: 01585
- Area code: 508/774
- FIPS code: 25-75400
- GNIS feature ID: 0618392
- Website: www.wbrookfield.com

West Brookfield is a town in Worcester County, Massachusetts, United States. The population was 3,833 at the 2020 census. It contains the census-designated place of the same name. Lucy Stone was born in West Brookfield, and George and Charles Merriam, the publishers of Webster's Dictionary, were raised there.

== History ==
West Brookfield was first settled by Europeans in 1665 and was officially incorporated in 1848, splitting off from Brookfield, which was originally settled as part of the Quaboag Plantation.

The town is believed to be the birthplace of asparagus in the New World. Diederik Leertouwer came to the United States in 1784 to promote trade between the Netherlands and New England. He later settled with his wife and daughter in West Brookfield where he carried out his duties as Consul and lived here between the years 1794 and 1798. At that time West Brookfield had a population greater than Worcester and was being considered for the county seat. Local legend has it that Diederik Leertouwer imported asparagus from his homeland and was the first to plant it in this area. This fact was forgotten until it was discovered in an old cookbook. Wild asparagus still grows in this area today. Leertouwer died here and is buried in the Old Indian Cemetery on Cottage Street in West Brookfield.

The town is also home to the Rock House Reservation, a massive, cave-like rock shelter, exposed after the glacial retreat 10,000 years ago, that served as a winter camp for Native Americans. By the mid-1800s, it was part of a farm owned by William Adams whose descendant, F. A. Carter, dammed a small stream to create Carter Pond and built the cottage now serving as a trailside museum and nature center. The reservation is open year-round, daily, sunrise to sunset. Admission is free to all.

== Geography ==
According to the United States Census Bureau, the town has a total area of 21.1 square miles (55 km^{2}), of which 20.5 square miles (53 km^{2}) is land and 0.6 square miles (1.6 km^{2}), or 3.03%, is water. West Brookfield is bounded on the southeast by Brookfield, on the north by North Brookfield and New Braintree, on the west by Ware and on the southwest by Warren. Route 9 is the main route in town. Other routes include Route 67, Route 19 (which begins in West Brookfield), and Route 32.

== Demographics ==
Historical population
| Year | Pop. | ±% |
|---|---|---|
| 1850 | 1,344 | — |
| 1860 | 1,548 | +15.2% |
| 1870 | 1,842 | +19.0% |
| 1880 | 1,917 | +4.1% |
| 1890 | 1,592 | −17.0% |
| 1900 | 1,448 | −9.0% |
| 1910 | 1,327 | −8.4% |
| 1920 | 1,281 | −3.5% |
| 1930 | 1,255 | −2.0% |
| 1940 | 1,387 | +10.5% |
| 1950 | 1,674 | +20.7% |
| 1960 | 2,053 | +22.6% |
| 1970 | 2,653 | +29.2% |
| 1980 | 3,026 | +14.1% |
| 1990 | 3,532 | +16.7% |
| 2000 | 3,804 | +7.7% |
| 2010 | 3,701 | −2.7% |
| 2020 | 3,833 | +3.6% |
| 2022* | 3,817 | −0.4% |
* = population estimate. Source: United States census records and Population Estimates Program data.

As of the census of 2000, there were 3,804 people, 1,362 households, and 965 families residing in the town. The population density was 185.8 inhabitants per square mile (71.7/km^{2}). There were 1,534 housing units at an average density of 74.9 per square mile (28.9/km^{2}). The racial makeup of the town was 98.16% White, 0.32% Black or African American, 0.24% Native American, 0.24% Asian, 0.05% Pacific Islander, 0.16% from other races, and 0.84% from two or more races. Hispanic or Latino of any race were 1.05% of the population.

There were 1,362 households, out of which 33.6% had children under the age of 18 living with them, 59.4% were married couples living together, 8.7% had a female householder with no husband present, and 29.1% were non-families. 23.6% of all households were made up of individuals, and 10.4% had someone living alone who was 65 years of age or older. The average household size was 2.53 and the average family size was 3.01.

In the town, the population was spread out, with 22.9% under the age of 18, 5.3% from 18 to 24, 25.7% from 25 to 44, 25.1% from 45 to 64, and 20.9% who were 65 years of age or older. The median age was 43 years. For every 100 females, there were 81.7 males. For every 100 females age 18 and over, there were 78.3 males.

The median income for a household in the town was $49,722, and the median income for a family was $58,750. Males had a median income of $41,211 versus $29,783 for females. The per capita income for the town was $21,501. About 4.0% of families and 6.8% of the population were below the poverty line, including 9.9% of those under age 18 and 4.6% of those age 65 or over.

== Government ==
State government
| State Representative(s): | Donnie Berthiaume (R) |
| State Senator(s): | Peter Durant (R) |
| Governor's Councilor(s): | Jen Caissie (R) |
Federal government
| U.S. Representative(s): | {{{fed_rep}}} |
| U.S. Senators: | Elizabeth Warren (D), Ed Markey (D) |

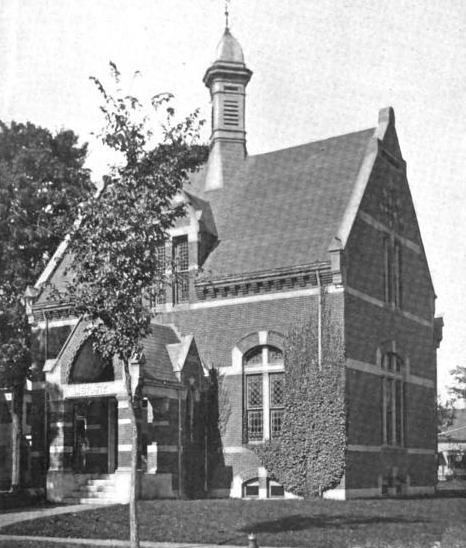
West Brookfield public library, 1899

== Library ==
The Merriam-Gilbert Public Library was built in 1880 when Charles Merriam (born in West Brookfield in 1806), famous for publishing the first Webster's Dictionary, provided the funding for the structure. After seven months of construction, the building was dedicated as the Merriam Public Library and Reading Room. The Library was eventually re-dedicated in 1960 as the Merriam-Gilbert Public Library after it received an unexpected and generous bequest from Helen E. Gilbert, a former West Brookfield native.

The exterior of the Library remains relatively unchanged with the exception of a cupola, which was destroyed in the Hurricane of 1938. Also, an elevator tower was discreetly added during the 1997 building renovation project that both refurbished and made the building accessible to the handicapped.

The following includes the names of those who have served as Head Librarian (Director) throughout the Library's history: Thomas S. Knowlton, 1880–1894; Charlotte E. Wilbur, 1895–1899; Florence A. Johnson, 1900–1906; Mary P. Foster, 1907–1916; Helen P. Shackley, 1916–1948; Evelyn Hazen, 1948–1951; Freeda E. Huyck, 1951–1953; Doris Jones, 1954–1955; Mildred B. Grazier, 1956–1960; Isabel Smith, 1960–1965; Joanne Scobie, 1965–1967; Roberta M. Rhodes, 1967–1987; Mary Hulser, 1987–1997; Michael J. Bennett, 1997–1999; Louise Garwood (Interim), 1999–2000; Elizabeth Zemelka, 2000–2001; Lisa M. Careau, 2001–2011; Carrie Grimshaw, 2011–2015; Katie Marsh, 2015–2017; MaryAnne Pelletier, 2017–2024; Amy Agro, 2024-present.

In fiscal year 2008, the town of West Brookfield spent 3.11% ($167,532) of its budget on its public library—approximately $44 per person, per year ($57.98 adjusted for inflation to 2022).

== Education ==
There is one public school in West Brookfield, West Brookfield Elementary School, serving grades K–6, which will close in June 2026. Elementary students will attend school in nearby Warren. West Brookfield is regionalized with Warren; students in grades 7–12 from both towns attend Quaboag Regional Middle/High School in Warren.

== Notable people ==
- Daniel Henry Chamberlain, 76th Governor of South Carolina
- Doug McMurdy, Springfield Indians hockey player, Red Tilson Trophy winner
- George Merrick Rice, businessman and Massachusetts state senator
- Lucy Stone, prominent American suffragist
