= Furnace Village Historic District =

Historic district in Massachusetts, United States

- U.S. National Register of Historic Places
- U.S. Historic district
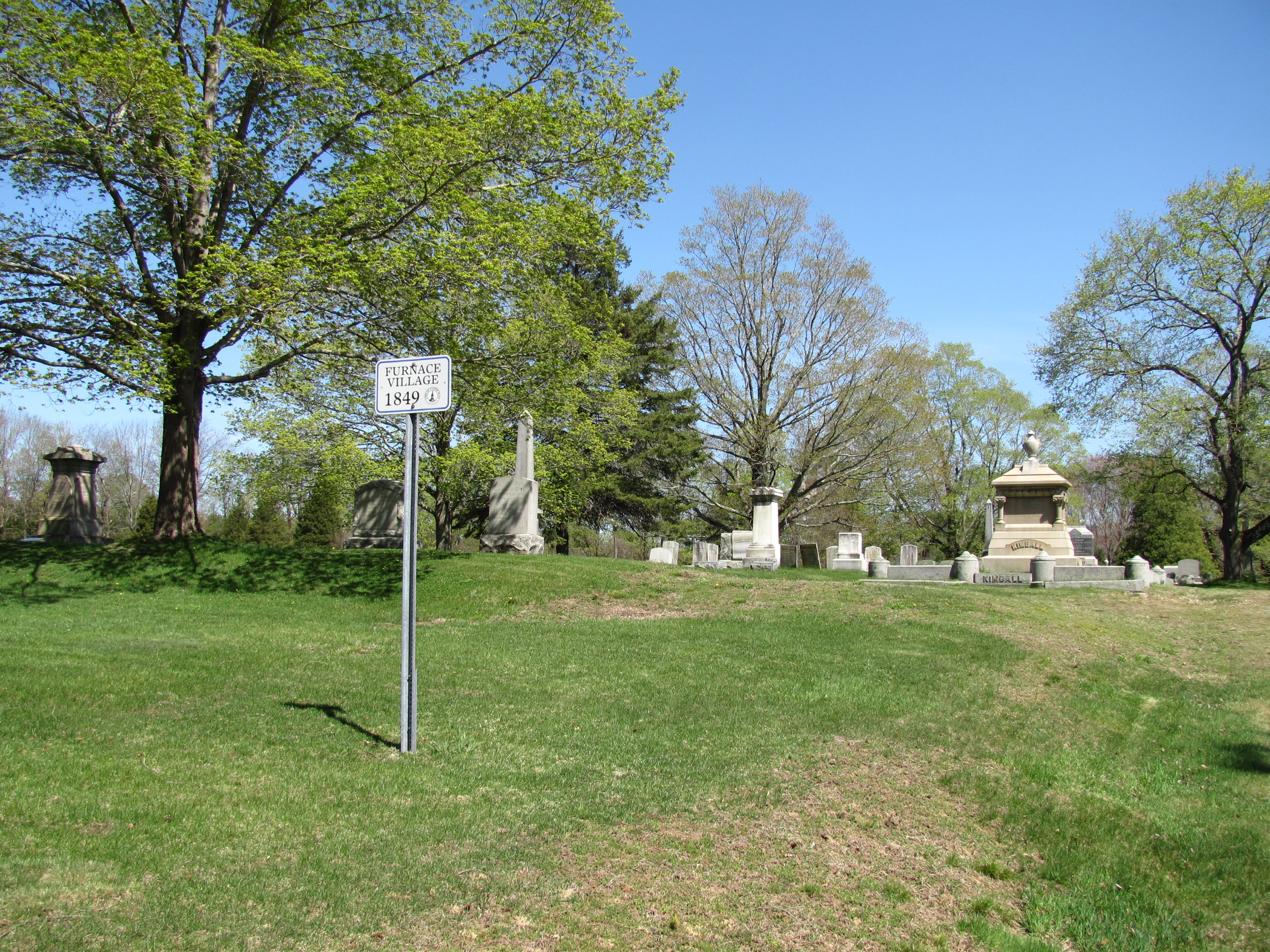
- Furnace Village Cemetery

- Location within Massachusetts Location within the United States
- Location: Easton, Massachusetts
- Coordinates: 42°1′24″N 71°7′57″W
- Built: 1751
- Architect: Multiple
- Architectural style: Greek Revival, Federal
- NRHP reference No.: 83003938
- Added to NRHP: October 6, 1983

The Furnace Village Historic District is a historic district encompassing a historic colonial industrial area in Easton, Massachusetts. It is centered on the junction of Foundry Street (Massachusetts Routes 106 and 123) with South Street and Poquanticut Avenue. The area was settled in 1723, with industrial activity beginning in 1742. An iron furnace was established here in 1751, and industrial uses continued into the 19th century. In addition to colonial-era houses, there are also 19th-century worker housing units.

The district was listed on the National Register of Historic Places in 1983.

== See also ==
- National Register of Historic Places listings in Bristol County, Massachusetts
