= Massachusetts Route 18 =

North-south state highway in Massachusetts, US

Route 18
- Route 18 highlighted in red

Route information
- Maintained by MassDOT
- Length: 41.561 mi (66.886 km)

Major junctions
- South end: US 6 in New Bedford
- I-195 in New Bedford Route 140 in New Bedford I-495 in Middleborough; US 44 / Route 28 in Middleborough; Route 28 / Route 104 in Bridgewater; Route 3 in Weymouth
- North end: Route 53 in Weymouth

Location
- Country: United States
- State: Massachusetts
- Counties: Bristol, Plymouth, Norfolk

Highway system
- Massachusetts State Highway System; Interstate; US; State
← Route 17	→ Route 19

Massachusetts Route 18 is a 41.561-mile-long (66.886 km) north–south state highway in Southeastern Massachusetts. Beginning in the city of New Bedford, it runs as a freeway for approximately 2 miles (3.2 km), continuing as a surface street until it reaches Weymouth.

The segment of Route 18 from its southern terminus to I-195 is part of the John F. Kennedy Memorial Highway, a state-maintained road that extends an additional 1.5 miles (2.4 km) south without the Route 18 designation.

== Route description ==
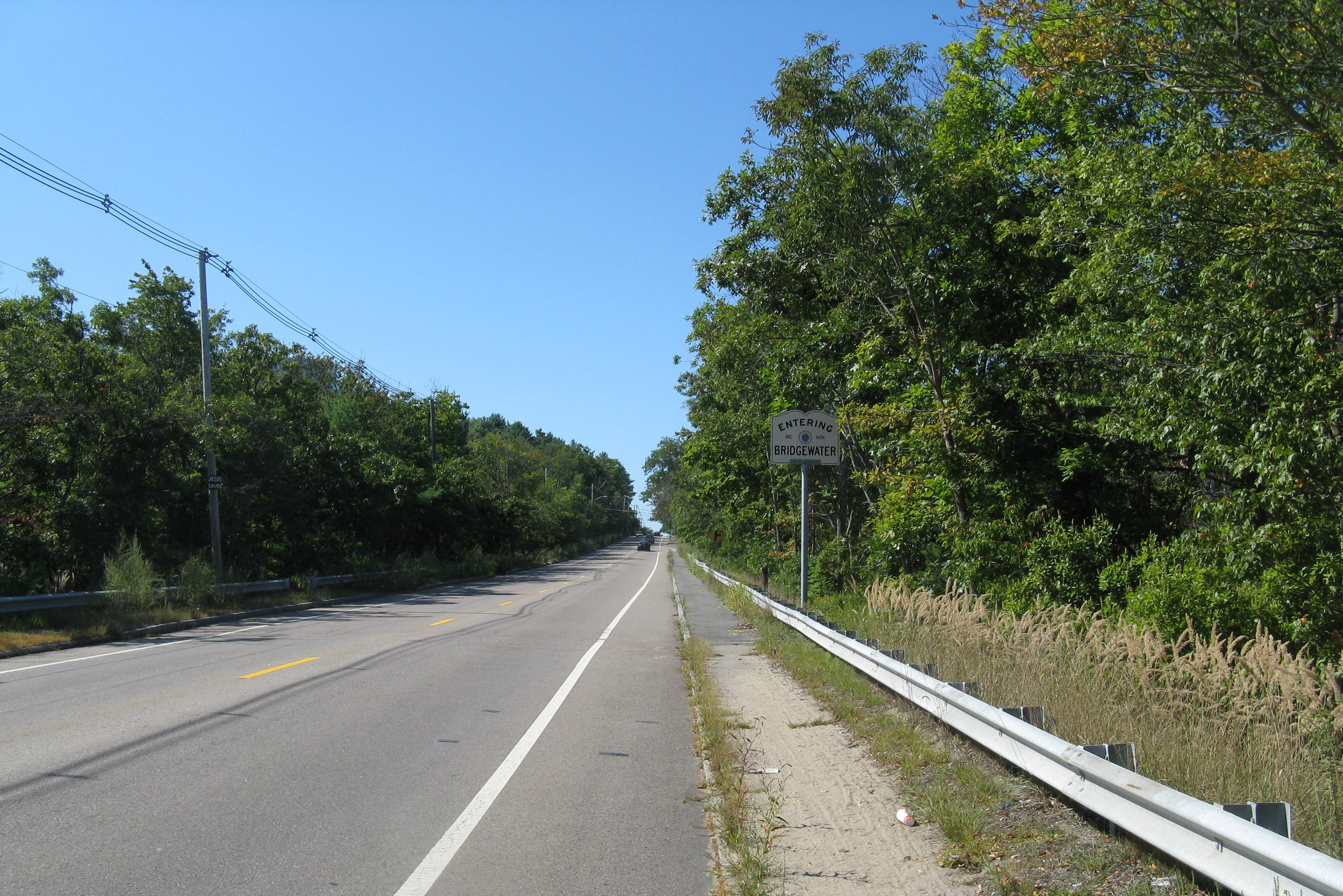
Southbound entering Bridgewater

Route 18 starts as a four-lane freeway, a continuation of John F. Kennedy Memorial Highway in downtown New Bedford, at U.S. Route 6. After the interchange with I-195, Route 18 runs via surface streets parallel to Route 140 for a while, up to a connector road with Route 140 northbound. (Before its highway route was constructed, Route 140 followed County Road from Taunton until terminating at Route 18 in Freetown near the New Bedford line.) Route 18 then continues on a generally northerly direction. The highway goes through the East Freetown section of Freetown, Lakeville (with a three-mile (5 km) concurrency with Route 105 along Assawompset Pond), Middleborough, where the highway meets U.S. Route 44 and Route 28 at the Middleboro rotary just north of Interstate 495, beginning a six-mile (10 km) concurrency with Route 28 until the center of Bridgewater, then continuing onwards through East Bridgewater, Whitman, Abington, and Weymouth, ending at Route 53.

== History ==
The current routing of Route 18 was established in 1933 taking over what was the routing of Route 102 from Weymouth to Route 28 in Bridgewater (the remainder to Route 140 in Taunton became part of Route 104) running concurrently with Route 28 from Bridgewater to Middleboro, taking a new highway constructed in 1932 from Middleboro to Lakeville, running concurrently with Route 105 for a short distance before turning southwest and taking a route to end at Route 140 in Freetown. Around 1968, Route 18 arrived at its current terminus when extended further south along a highway parallel to Route 140 to end at U.S. 6.

When first established in 1927, Route 18 ran on a different alignment from Route 123 in Rockland north to Route 3A in Hingham using Hingham Street in Rockland; Pond Street in Norwell; and Main, Short, Leavitt and East Streets in Hingham. In 1931 the Hingham portion became part of Route 228 and the remaining parts in Norwell and Rockland had the Route 18 designation removed in 1932.

=== Highway improvements ===
A major fault of Route 18 north of Bridgewater is its intersection patterns. At all lights north of Bridgewater center, the road widens to four lanes temporarily, before and after the intersection. While this helps alleviate backups at the lights and assists vehicles turning left off of the route, it creates bottlenecks after the intersection, where the two lanes re-merge into one. To improve this, the Massachusetts Department of Transportation's Highway Division will be widening the section of Route 18 from Highland Place in Weymouth to Route 139 in Abington from two to four lanes. The $26 million project was originally planned to begin in 2013 but had yet to break ground as of July 2014. The project was substantially completed in late 2022 with the dedication of the rebuilt bridge over the MBTA Commuter Rail honoring fallen Weymouth Police officer, Michael C. Chesna.

== Major intersections ==
County	Location	mi	km	Destinations	Notes
Bristol	New Bedford	0.0	0.0	Cove Street / Rodney French Boulevard south	Continuation south
Bristol	New Bedford	0.4	0.64	River Street	Southbound exit only
Bristol	New Bedford	1.4	2.3	US 6 east	Northbound exit only
Bristol	New Bedford	1.5 0.000	2.4 0.000	Elm Street – Downtown	Southern terminus of Route 18
Bristol	New Bedford	0.000	0.000	Southern terminus of freeway section; northern terminus of JFK Boulevard	
Bristol	New Bedford	0.031	0.050	US 6 – Dartmouth, Fairhaven	Southbound exit and northbound entrance
Bristol	New Bedford	0.418	0.673	Purchase Street	Southbound exit and northbound entrance (via Hillman Street)
Bristol	New Bedford	0.881	1.418	Weld Street	Southbound exit only
Bristol	New Bedford	1.241	1.997	I-195 – Fall River, Cape Cod	Northbound exits and southbound entrances; exit 26 (former exit 15) on I-195; no access between Route 18 south and I-195 or between I-195 and Route 18 north without using local roads Coggeshall Street and Washburn Drive
Bristol	New Bedford	1.375	2.213	Northern terminus of freeway section; at-grade intersection with Coggeshall Street	
Bristol	New Bedford	4.811	7.743	Route 140 north – Taunton, Boston	Exit 6 on Route 140; access via Ashley Boulevard; no access to Route 140 southbound
Plymouth	Lakeville	13.508	21.739	Route 105 south – Rochester	Southern terminus of concurrency with Route 105
Plymouth	Lakeville	16.193	26.060	Route 105 north – Middleboro, Plymouth	Northern terminus of concurrency with Route 105
Plymouth	Lakeville	18.097	29.124	Route 79 – Middleboro, Assonet, Fall River	
Plymouth	Middleborough	19.715– 19.944	31.728– 32.097	I-495 to Route 24 – Wareham, Cape Cod, Marlboro, Boston	Exit 14 on I-495
Plymouth	Middleborough	20.062– 20.255	32.287– 32.597	US 44 / Route 28 south to I-495 – Middleboro, Plymouth, Taunton, Marlboro	Rotary; southern terminus of concurrency with Route 28
Plymouth	Bridgewater	26.172– 26.308	42.120– 42.339	Route 28 north / Route 104 – Taunton, Kingston, West Bridgewater, Brockton	Rotary; northern terminus of concurrency with Route 28
Plymouth	East Bridgewater	28.094	45.213	Route 106 west – West Bridgewater, Plainville	Southern terminus of concurrency with Route 106
Plymouth	East Bridgewater	28.197	45.379	Route 106 east – Halifax, Kingston	Northern terminus of concurrency with Route 106
Plymouth	Whitman	32.066	51.605	Route 14 – Brockton, Hanson	Site of the Toll House Inn (birthplace of the chocolate chip cookie) northwest of here
Plymouth	Whitman	32.798	52.783	Route 27 – Brockton, Kingston	
Plymouth	Abington	34.544	55.593	Route 123 – Brockton, Hanover	
Plymouth	Abington	36.168	58.207	Route 139 – Holbrook, Rockland	
Norfolk	Weymouth	37.085	59.683	Route 58 south – Rockland	Northern terminus of Route 58
Norfolk	Weymouth	40.684– 40.940	65.475– 65.887	Route 3 to I-93 / US 1 – Boston, Cape Cod	Exit 38 on Route 3
Norfolk	Weymouth	41.561	66.886	Route 53 to Route 3A – Braintree, Quincy, Hanover	Northern terminus
1.000 mi = 1.609 km; 1.000 km = 0.621 mi: Concurrency terminus; Incomplete access; Route transition
