= MA6 =

MA-6 may refer to:

- Massachusetts's 6th congressional district
- Massachusetts Route 6
- Mercury-Atlas 6, a spaceflight of Project Mercury, first American orbital spaceflight
