= Stephen Bacon House =

Historic house in Massachusetts, United States

- U.S. National Register of Historic Places
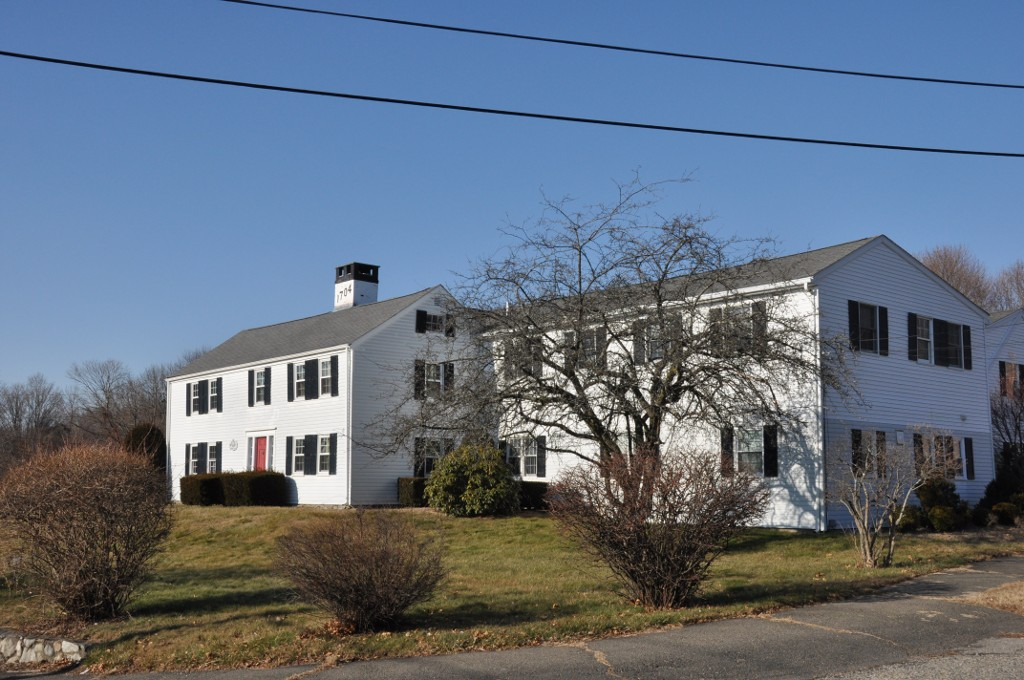

- Location within Massachusetts Location within the United States
- Location: 105 N. Main St., Natick, Massachusetts
- Coordinates: 42°17′30″N 71°21′24″W
- Area: less than one acre
- Architectural style: Colonial
- MPS: First Period Buildings of Eastern Massachusetts TR
- NRHP reference No.: 90000174
- Added to NRHP: March 9, 1990

The Stephen Bacon House is a historic First Period house in Natick, Massachusetts. Possibly built as early as 1704 by one of Natick's first settlers, it is one of the town's oldest surviving buildings. It was listed on the National Register of Historic Places in 1990.

== Description and history ==
The Stephen Bacon House is located north of Natick's modern downtown, on a lot bounded on the west by North Main Street (Massachusetts Route 27), the south by Gilbert Road, and the east by Franconia Avenue. It is a 2 1/2-story wood-frame structure, with a gabled roof, central chimney, and clapboarded exterior. Its main facade is five bays wide, with asymmetrically placed windows and a roughly centered entrance. A four-bay 2 1/2-story ell extends to the right, set at a recess from the main block. A shed-roof ell extends to the rear, giving the house a saltbox profile. The interior of the house includes features typical of transitional late First Period houses, included a beaded summer beam, a side-facing oven in the front right chamber, and an exposed summer beam in the upper left chamber with chamfered edges.

The oldest portion of this house is the left side front, which was built c. 1704 by Stephen Bacon, one of Natick's early settlers. The right side and the rear leanto were later 18th-century additions, as is the block to the right. This building appears on one of the earliest maps of the area (in 1724), and the town's first school classes were held here. During the American Revolutionary War, it was here that a local company of minutemen mustered.

== See also ==
- National Register of Historic Places listings in Middlesex County, Massachusetts
