= Massachusetts Route 240 =

State highway in Bristol County, Massachusetts, US

Route 240
- Route 240 highlighted in red

Route information
- Maintained by MassDOT
- Length: 1.3 mi (2.1 km)

Major junctions
- South end: US 6 in Fairhaven
- North end: I-195 in Fairhaven

Location
- Country: United States
- State: Massachusetts
- Counties: Bristol

Highway system
- Massachusetts State Highway System; Interstate; US; State
← Route 228	→ Route 286

Route 240 is a 1.3-mile-long (2.1 km) south–north state highway in southeastern Massachusetts. Its southern terminus is at U.S. Route 6 (US 6) in Fairhaven and its northern terminus is at Interstate 195 (I-195) in Fairhaven.

== Route description ==
Route 240 acts as a connector between U.S. Route 6 and I-195 in Fairhaven. There are ghost ramps at the northern end of the highway that show that Route 240 was intended to continue north of I-195 to Acushnet, which was originally planned in the 1970s, but lost traction over the years. An aerial view of the northern terminus hints of a continuation beyond that point. Most maps indicate that this divided highway is one that has limited access, but that is not true as there is an at-grade intersection with traffic signals at Bridge Street, just north of U.S. 6.

== Major intersections ==
The entire route is in Fairhaven, Bristol County. All exits are unnumbered.

mi	km	Destinations	Notes
0.0	0.0	US 6 (Huttleston Avenue) – Fairhaven, New Bedford, Mattapoisett	Southern terminus; at-grade intersection
0.5	0.80	Bridge Street	At-grade intersection
0.5	0.80	Southern end of freeway section	
		I-195 east – Wareham, Cape Cod	Northbound exit and southbound entrance; exit 29 on I-195
1.3	2.1	I-195 west – Fall River	Northern terminus
1.000 mi = 1.609 km; 1.000 km = 0.621 mi: Incomplete access
