= Massachusetts Route 140 =

Highway in Massachusetts

Route 140
- Alfred M. Bessette Memorial Highway
- Route 140 highlighted in red

Route information
- Maintained by MassDOT
- Length: 107.76 mi (173.42 km)

Major junctions
- South end: US 6 in New Bedford
- I-195 in New Bedford; Route 24 in Taunton; US 44 / Route 138 in Taunton; I-495 in Mansfield and Franklin; I-95 in Foxborough; US 1 in Foxborough and Wrentham; Route 122 / Route 30 in Grafton; Route 9 in Shrewsbury; US 20 in Shrewsbury; I-290 in Shrewsbury; I-190 in Sterling; Route 2 / Route 2A in Westminster
- North end: Route 12 in Winchendon

Location
- Country: United States
- State: Massachusetts
- Counties: Bristol, Plymouth, Norfolk, Worcester

Highway system
- Massachusetts State Highway System; Interstate; US; State
| ← Route 139 | → Route 141 |
| ← Route 63 | → Route 66 |

Route 140 is a 107.76-mile-long (173.42 km) north—south state highway which passes through Bristol, Norfolk and Worcester counties in Massachusetts. The highway follows a southeast-northwest trajectory, running from U.S. Route 6 (US 6) in New Bedford just north of Buzzards Bay northwest to an intersection with Route 12 in Winchendon, a few miles south of the border with New Hampshire.

The southern 19 miles (30 km) of Route 140 between New Bedford and Taunton is a freeway known as the Alfred M. Bessette Memorial Highway, or more commonly, the Taunton-New Bedford Expressway.

== Route description ==
=== New Bedford to Taunton ===
Route 140 begins at an intersection with U.S. Route 6 (Kempton Street) and Brownell Avenue on the west side of New Bedford. This intersection is signed as exit 1 when traveling southbound on Route 140. About a mile north, Route 140 comes to its first interchange, a cloverleaf with Interstate 195, which connects Providence to Cape Cod. Route 140 then curves slightly to the right to avoid New Bedford Regional Airport, which is accessible from Hathaway Road (exit 3). Route 140 eventually leaves New Bedford and enters East Freetown, providing an exit that drops off near the center of the village. Route 140 then runs parallel to Long Pond before curving slightly west. The freeway section of Route 140 ends a few miles north at exit 20 (formerly 12), which is for Route 24. At the former site of the Silver City Galleria. Meanwhile, Route 140 runs along County Street towards downtown Taunton.

Route 140 runs partially concurrent with Route 79 Truck in order to bypass certain sections of Route 79 proper. The two designations are concurrent from exit 16 (Route 79) (old exit 10) to exit 20 (Route 24). At exit 20, Route 79 Truck leaves Route 140 for Route 24, where the truck route meets its parent at exit 11 (formerly 9) on MA-24.

=== Taunton to Wrentham ===
From the final interchange with Route 24 in Taunton, Route 140 extends northwest towards Taunton Center, having a 0.3 mi (0.45 km) concurrency with US 44, just east of Taunton Center. As the two proceed to Taunton Green, the roads around the Green join and split Route 140, US 44, and Route 138. Route 140 splits off from the Taunton Green, passing the Bristol County Courthouse and heading northwest from the Green along Court Street. Route 140 brings its way through the northwest portion of Taunton, into Norton, past Wheaton College, and sharing a brief junction with MA-123. As Route 140 crosses the border from Norton to Mansfield, it passes by the Xfinity Center before reaching a junction with Interstate 495. Route 140 shares a brief stretch of highway interchange with I-495, as the route then splits off and heads north through Mansfield Center, intersecting MA-106. Route 140 crosses into Foxboro, bearing an interchange with Interstate 95, and further north a junction with US-1 North near Gillette Stadium, with the US-1 South exit being another mile up the road in Wrentham. Route 140 loops through Wrentham Center, sharing a junction with Route 1A, and past King Philip Regional High School, into Franklin.

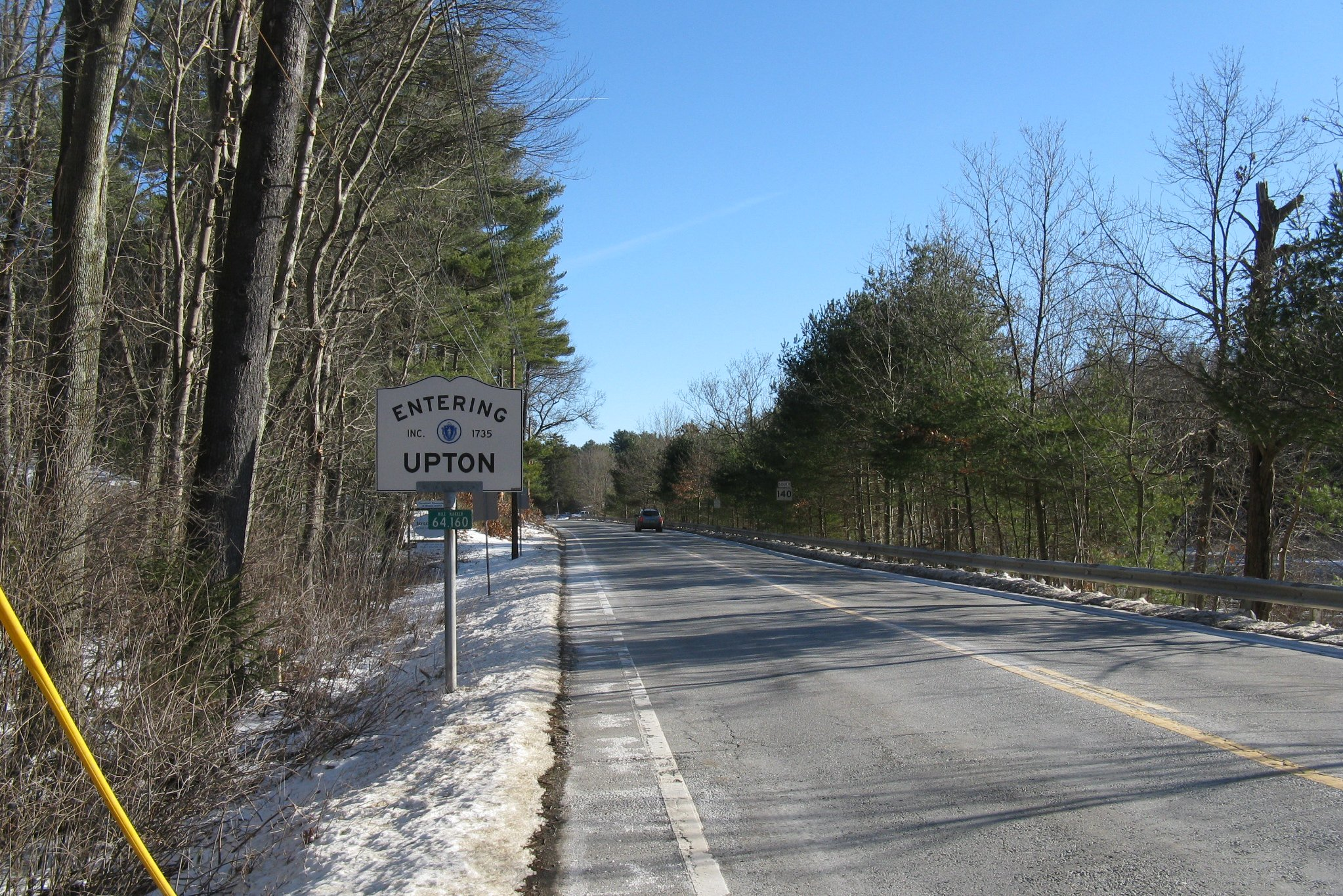
Route 140 southbound entering Upton

=== Franklin to Upton ===
Route 140 enters Franklin from Wrentham, passing through Franklin Center and Dean College. Route 140 bypasses Franklin High School, and enters its second interchange with I-495. At this point, Route 140 extends west and heads into Bellingham. Route 140 spends a brief time in Bellingham, sharing a brief concurrence with Route 126, which extends north to I-495, and south into Woonsocket, Rhode Island. As Route 140 exits Bellingham, the road sharply turns north into the eastern edges of Mendon and Hopedale for a total of nearly three miles. Route 140 then enters Milford in a northwest trajectory, staying parallel to the Milford/Hopedale border for the route's duration in Milford. Route 140 enters a junction at Milford Regional Medical Center with Route 16, which leads westbound into Mendon and Hopedale Center, and eastbound to Route 85 and Route 109, both with terminations at Route 16. Route 140 enters a final small portion of Hopedale, then proceeds into the eastern part of Upton, passing through Upton Center and bypassing both Blackstone Valley Regional Technical High School and Nipmuc Regional High School.

=== Grafton to West Boylston ===
Route 140 enters Grafton through the southeast, proceeding north and sharply turning west into Grafton Center and the town common. Route 140 bears right, northward, down a mile-long hill that ends at a traffic light that begins a 1.5-mile (2.4 km) concurrency with Route 122. Routes 140 and 122 proceed north through North Grafton, passing under the Mass Pike. Immediately after crossing under the Mass Pike, Route 122 splits off to west towards Millbury and Worcester, while Route 140 begins a concurrency with the western terminus of Route 30, and heads towards Shrewsbury. The concurrency with Route 30 is 1/4 mile (0.40 km) long, as Route 30 splits east towards Grafton station of the MBTA Commuter Rail's Framingham/Worcester Line, Tufts Animal Hospital, and the town of Westborough. As Route 140 enters Shrewsbury it briefly becomes an undivided, high-speed wide-median route, where it meets with U.S. 20 at an overpass. 1.8 miles (2.9 km) later, Route 140 meets Route 9 at an underpass. Route 9 West serves as the main road into Worcester from Shrewsbury and Northborough, while eastbound heads in the direction of Westborough and towards Interstate 495. Route 140 extends north into Shrewsbury Center and shares an interchange with Interstate 290 at the northern edge of town. Just north of the interchange, Route 140 enters Boylston, where it meets Route 70. After Route 70, Route 140 passes the South Bay of the Wachusett Reservoir and continues northwest into West Boylston, where, in the town center, it begins a brief concurrency with Route 12. The two routes extend north for 0.8 miles (1.3 km), crossing over the Wachusett Reservoir via a causeway, after which Route 12 splits north towards Sterling. Route 140 extends northwest from this intersection, soon after passing the Old Stone Church, and continues for 1.1 miles (1.8 km) alongside the Thomas Basin before crossing the Stillwater River into the historic village of Oakdale. From the village, Route 140 continues north into the western portion of Sterling.

=== Sterling to Winchendon ===
As Route 140 enters Sterling, it encounters an interchange with Interstate 190, which connects Worcester to the south with Leominster and Fitchburg to the north. Route 140 travels northwest to an intersection with Route 62 right before entering Princeton. Route 140 then joins Route 31 in East Princeton. The two routes run concurrently for 1.6 miles (2.6 km), after which Route 140 continues northwest into Westminster, passing between Wachusett Lake and Wyman Pond north of Mount Wachusett. Route 140 runs north from the mountain until meeting Route 2, a controlled-access highway, and the parallel surface road Route 2A at an interchange. Route 140 runs northwest concurrently with Route 2, bypassing the Westminster town center, before leaving the highway at the following interchange. From Route 2, Route 140 continues northwest into Gardner, running northeast of the city center, during which it intersects Route 101. The route turns north upon entering Winchendon where Route 140 ends at an intersection with Route 12. Route 12 continues northwest into the town center, crossing U.S. Route 202 before proceeding to the New Hampshire border.

== History ==
=== Previous designation ===
Route 64
- Location: West Boylston–Gardner
- Existed: 1933–1939

The section of modern Route 140 from West Boylston to Gardner was numbered Route 64 when it was first commissioned by 1933. By 1939, the entirety of the route was redesignated as Route 140, effectively extending existing Route 140 northwest, which had previously ended in Grafton.

In 1947, the Massachusetts Department of Public Works announced plans for a "Relocated Route 140", one of the first steps as part of its statewide expressway program. Between 1955–1970 the current route was widened and straightened, while the section south of Taunton, which runs to New Bedford, was built as an expressway. The New Bedford Expressway was to serve as a spur from the Fall River Expressway, connecting to points in the Boston metropolitan area. The creation of this spur was considered a key component of revitalizing the old port city of New Bedford.

Prior to the building of the freeway section, County Street (the section of road beginning at the Taunton River, and also known as County Road) brought the road southward through East Taunton, Berkley, Lakeville and East Freetown. The road, which runs parallel to the freeway and crosses it in Lakeville, merged with Route 18 in East Freetown, just north of the New Bedford city limits. The old alignment begins in front of the Silver City Galleria in Taunton.

=== Highway improvements ===
A section of Route 140 in Franklin was widened from two to four lanes wide. The $22 million project began in 2003 and was completed in 2007.

In fall 2013, the ramp from Route 140 to I-495 south at Exit 11 (now Exit 30) in Mansfield was completed. This ramp removed the need for traffic exiting the Xfinity Center in Mansfield to use a significant two-lane portion of Route 140.

== Major intersections ==
| County | Location | mi | km | Old exit | New exit | Destinations | Notes |
|---|---|---|---|---|---|---|---|
| Bristol | New Bedford | 0.0 | 0.0 | | 1 | US 6 – New Bedford, Fairhaven, Dartmouth | Southern terminus; at-grade intersection |
| Bristol | New Bedford | | | Southern end of freeway section | | | |
| Bristol | New Bedford | 1.2 | 1.9 | | 2 | I-195 – Fall River, Cape Cod | Signed as exits 2A (east) and 2B (west); exits 24A-B on I-195 |
| Bristol | New Bedford | 1.5 | 2.4 | | 3 | Hathaway Road | To New Bedford Airport |
| Bristol | New Bedford | 3.2 | 5.1 | | 4 | Mount Pleasant Street / Kings Highway – Acushnet | |
| Bristol | New Bedford | 5.0 | 8.0 | | 5 | Phillips Road / Church Street – Freetown | |
| Bristol | New Bedford | 5.7 | 9.2 | | 6 | Route 18 (Ashley Boulevard) | Southbound exit and northbound entrance |
| Bristol | New Bedford | 6.8 | 10.9 | | 7 | Braley Road | |
| Bristol | Freetown | 9.8 | 15.8 | 8 | 10 | Chace Road – East Freetown, Assonet | |
| Plymouth | Lakeville | 12.2 | 19.6 | 9 | 12 | County Road – Lakeville | |
| Bristol | Taunton | 16.0 | 25.7 | 10 | 16 | Route 79 – Lakeville, Myricks | |
| Bristol | Taunton | 18.7 | 30.1 | 11 | 19 | Stevens Street / County Street – East Taunton | Signed as exits 19A (Stevens Street) and 19B (County Street) southbound |
| Bristol | Taunton | 19.2 | 30.9 | 12 | 20 | Route 24 – Fall River, Boston | Signed as exits 20A (south) and 20B (north); exits 17A-B on Route 24 |
| Bristol | Taunton | 19.2 | 30.9 | Northern end of freeway section | | | |
| Bristol | Taunton | 22.0 | 35.4 | | | US 44 east – Cape Cod | Southern end of US 44 concurrency |
| Bristol | Taunton | 22.3 | 35.9 | | | US 44 west / Route 138 – Providence, RI, Raynham, Somerset | Taunton Green; northern end of US 44 concurrency |
| Bristol | Norton | 29.9 | 48.1 | | | Route 123 – Brockton, Attleboro | |
| Bristol | Mansfield | 33.4 | 53.8 | Southern end of limited-access section | | | |
| Bristol | Mansfield | 33.4 | 53.8 | 11 | 30 | I-495 south – Taunton, Cape Cod | Southern end of I-495 concurrency; no southbound entrance |
| Bristol | Mansfield | | | 12 | 31 | I-495 north to I-95 – Mansfield, Marlboro | Northern end of I-495 concurrency; exit number not signed southbound |
| Bristol | Mansfield | 35.4 | 57.0 | | | Route 106 – Plainville, Mansfield | At-grade intersection |
| Norfolk | Foxborough | 36.5 | 58.7 | | | I-95 to I-495 – Boston, Providence RI | Exits 13A-B on I-95 |
| Norfolk | Foxborough | 36.5 | 58.7 | Northern end of limited-access section | | | |
| Norfolk | Foxborough | 40.0 | 64.4 | | | US 1 north – Norwood, Boston | Access via Main Street |
| Norfolk | Foxborough | 40.3 | 64.9 | | | Route 115 north – Norfolk, Millis | Southern terminus of Route 115 |
| Norfolk | Wrentham | 40.8 | 65.7 | | | US 1 south – North Attleboro, Providence, RI | Access via local roads |
| Norfolk | Wrentham | 43.0 | 69.2 | | | Route 1A – Plainville, Woonsocket, RI, Norfolk, Walpole | To Route 121 via South |
| Norfolk | Franklin | 49.0 | 78.9 | | | I-495 – Marlboro, Lowell, Taunton, Cape Cod | Exit 43 on I-495 |
| Norfolk | Bellingham | 51.6 | 83.0 | | | Route 126 south – Blackstone, Woonsocket, RI | Southern end of Route 126 concurrency |
| Norfolk | Bellingham | | | | | Route 126 north – Medway, Framingham | Northern end of Route 126 concurrency |
| Worcester | Milford | 56.4 | 90.8 | | | Route 16 – Milford, Holliston, Hopedale, Mendon | To Route 85 and Route 109 via East |
| Worcester | Grafton | 67.8 | 109.1 | | | Route 122 south – Northbridge, Providence, RI | Southern end of Route 122 concurrency |
| Worcester | Grafton | 69.2 | 111.4 | | | Route 122 north to I-90 (Mass Pike) – Worcester Route 30 begins | Northern end of Route 122 concurrency, To US 20, Route 146 and Route 122A; western terminus of Route 30 |
| Worcester | Grafton | 69.5 | 111.8 | | | Route 30 east to Route 135 – Westboro | Northern end of Route 30 concurrency; To Route 135 via east on Westboro |
| Worcester | Shrewsbury | 70.892 | 114.090 | | | US 20 – Northboro, Framingham, Marlboro, Worcester, Auburn | Interchange |
| Worcester | Shrewsbury | 72.7 | 117.0 | | | Route 9 – Framingham, Boston, Worcester, Leicester | Interchange |
| Worcester | Shrewsbury | 75.9 | 122.1 | | | I-290 – Marlboro, Worcester | Exits 26A-B on I-290 |
| Worcester | Boylston | 77.8 | 125.2 | | | Route 70 – Boylston Center, Clinton, Worcester, Millbury | |
| Worcester | West Boylston | 80.7 | 129.9 | | | Route 12 south – Worcester Route 110 begins | Southern end of Route 12 concurrency; western terminus of Route 110 |
| Worcester | West Boylston | 81.5 | 131.2 | | | Route 12 north / Route 110 east – Clinton, Fitchburg | Northern end of Route 12 and Route 110 concurrency |
| Worcester | Sterling | 83.9 | 135.0 | | | I-190 – Leominster, Fitchburg, Worcester | Exit 9 on I-190 |
| Worcester | Sterling | 86.2 | 138.7 | | | Route 62 – Princeton, Sterling | |
| Worcester | Princeton | 89.7 | 144.4 | | | Route 31 south – Princeton | Southern end of Route 31 concurrency |
| Worcester | Princeton | 91.4 | 147.1 | | | Route 31 north – Fitchburg, Ashby | Northern end of Route 31 concurrency |
| Worcester | Westminster | 95.5 | 153.7 | Southern end of freeway section | | | |
| Worcester | Westminster | 95.5 | 153.7 | 25 | 92 | Route 2 east / Route 2A – Concord, Boston, Westminster, Fitchburg | Southern end of Route 2 concurrency |
| Worcester | Westminster | 97.5 | 156.9 | 24 | 90 | Route 2 west – Athol, Greenfield, Westminster | Northern end of Route 2 concurrency |
| Worcester | Westminster | 97.5 | 156.9 | Northern end of freeway section | | | |
| Worcester | Gardner | 100.3 | 161.4 | | | Route 101 – Gardner, Templeton, Ashburnham | |
| Worcester | Winchendon | 107.76 | 173.42 | | | Route 12 to US 202 – Fitchburg, Winchendon | Northern terminus |
1.000 mi = 1.609 km; 1.000 km = 0.621 mi: Concurrency terminus; Incomplete access
