= Massachusetts Route 79 =

State highway in southeastern Massachusetts, US

Route 79
- Route 79 highlighted in red

Route information
- Maintained by MassDOT
- Length: 18.47 mi (29.72 km)

Major junctions
- South end: I-195 / Route 138 in Fall River
- US 6 / Route 138 in Fall River; Route 24 from Fall River to Assonet; Route 140 in Taunton
- North end: Route 105 in Lakeville

Location
- Country: United States
- State: Massachusetts
- Counties: Bristol, Plymouth

Highway system
- Massachusetts State Highway System; Interstate; US; State
← Route 78	→ Route 80

Route 79 is a 18.47-mile-long (29.72 km) state highway in southeastern Massachusetts. The route had formerly began as a highway in Fall River, also known as the Fall River Viaduct and Western Fall River Expressway, before becoming a more rural route further north. Most of the southern expressway portion of the route was permanently closed by MassDOT in 2023 for conversion into a street level urban boulevard.

== Route description ==
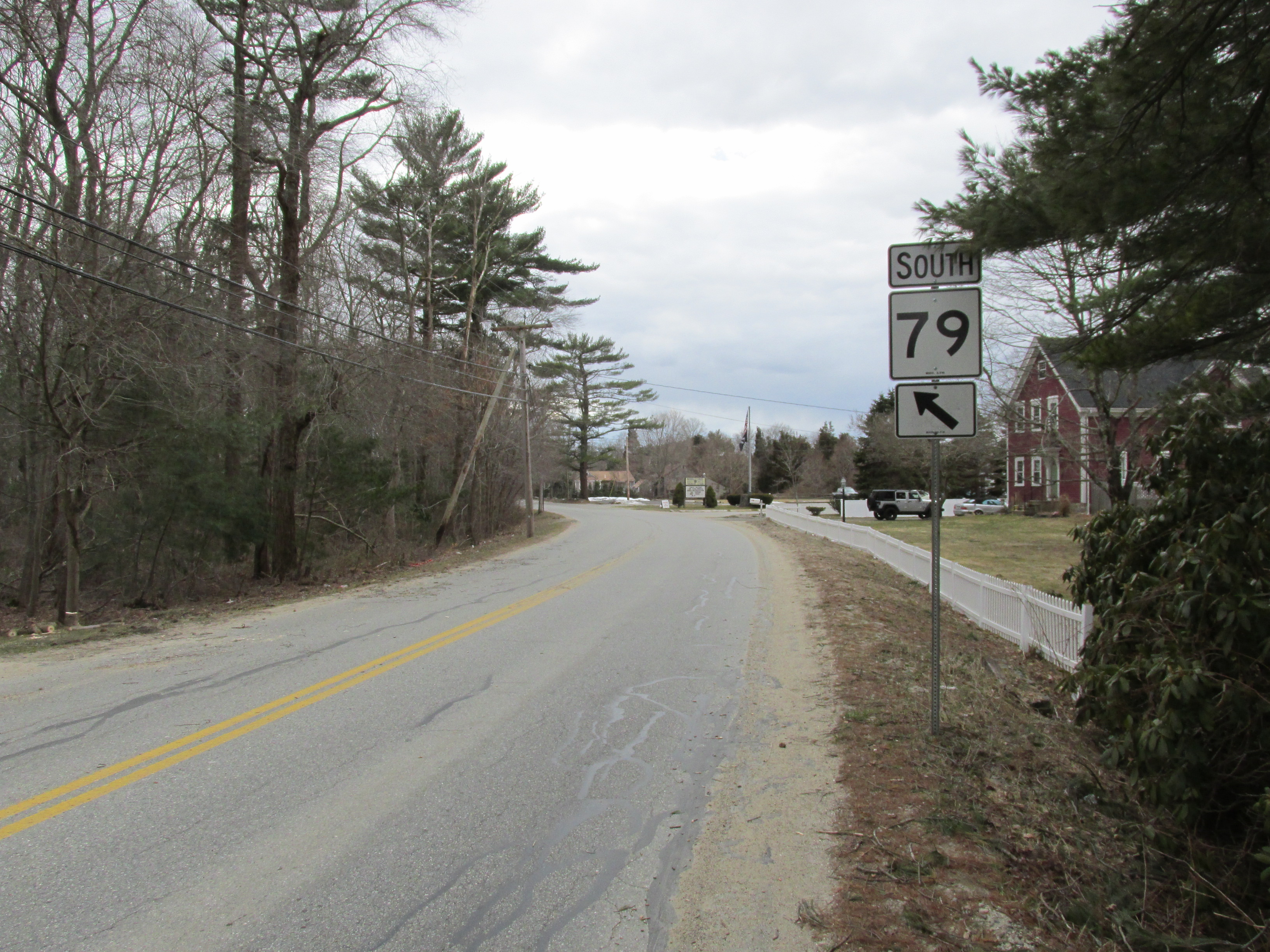
Route 79 in Myricks

Route 79 begins south of the Braga Bridge and I-195, multiplexed with Route 138 as a surface four-lane controlled-access highway. It has exits to Davol Street, which act as one-way frontage roads on both sides of Route 79, and to the Veterans Memorial Bridge, at which point Route 138 leaves Route 79 and goes over the bridge.

The route continues northward, passing under North Main Street with exit access to that street. It then connects to Route 24 at that route's exit 7. There is no access between northbound Route 79 and southbound Route 24 or between northbound Route 24 and southbound Route 79. The route continues concurrently along Route 24 into the Assonet section of the town of Freetown, where it leaves its concurrency at exit 11 (formerly 9), turning on to South Main Street. (South Main Street southbound in Assonet connects to North Main Street in Fall River.) The route passes through the village before turning eastward along Elm Street, intertwining with the Assonet River as both make their way into Berkley.

In Berkley, Route 79 passes through the village of Myricks, in the far eastern end of the town. It crosses the New Bedford Secondary in Myricks, and Route 140 just over the Taunton line. In Taunton, the route follows along the Taunton-Lakeville town line before leaving Taunton completely. In Lakeville, the route heads through the northern part of the town, crossing Route 18 and passing the former Lakeville Hospital, before ending at a 4-way intersection with Route 105 and Commercial Drive (the entry to Lakeville station).

== History ==
The route was originally a fully surface route. In 1958, the northern end of the Western Fall River Expressway opened, which carried Route 79 from Route 24 south to an interchange at North Main Street in Fall River. In 1965, as part of the construction of I-195 from Swansea through Somerset and Fall River to Westport, the southern section of the expressway, along the Fall River Viaduct, was opened, connecting between an interchange with Route 138 ("Broadway Extended") and I-195 north to a partial interchange with Route 138 along a one-way pair of North Davol Street and South Davol Street. Prior to the completion of the central section of the Western Fall River Expressway (relocation of Route 79) which connected the 1965-opened southern section on the Fall River Viaduct to the 1958-built northern section (between North Main Street and a partial interchange with Route 24, both in North Fall River) in 1974, Route 79 followed North Main Street south of the end of the expressway's northern section down to Route 79's southern terminus at US 6 (President Avenue) slightly to the east of the completed expressway and Davol Street one-way pair.

MassDOT completed a large multi-acre highway interchange with Route 79 and U.S. Route 6 as a part of the construction of the Veterans Memorial Bridge in 2011.

In 2012, the northern terminus of Route 79 was relocated. Before the project, the northern terminus of Route 79 still ended at Route 105, only 1/10 of a mile north of its current terminus, but it was too close to the southbound ramps for Interstate 495. By relocating Route 79 to a four-way intersection with Route 105 and Commercial Drive, traffic was eased during rush hour. Instead of Route 79 traffic looping onto Route 105 to get to the MBTA station, the new alignment provides easier access to the MBTA station from areas such as North Lakeville, East Taunton, Berkley and Freetown.

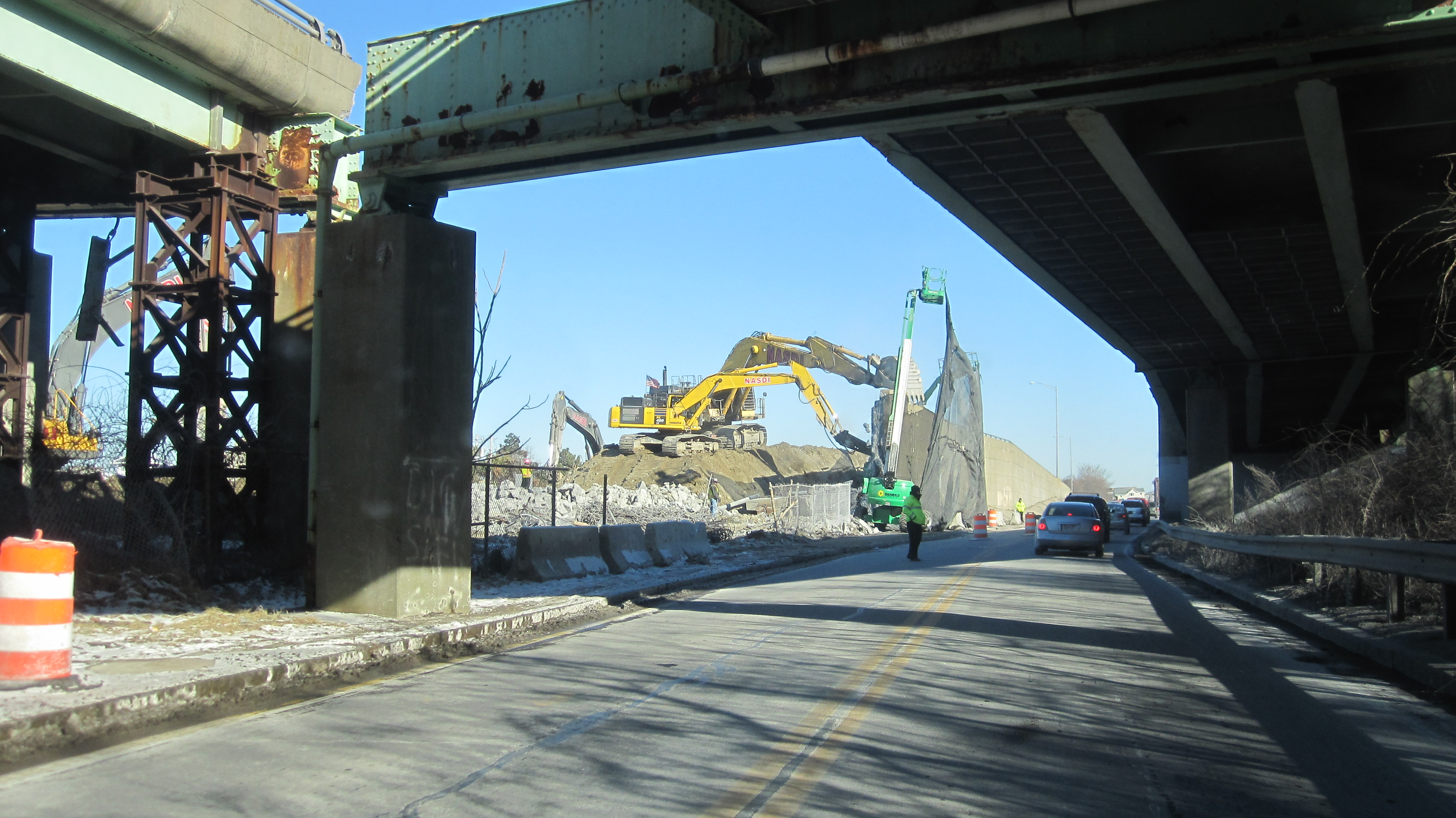
Fall River Viaduct in the process of being demolished

The southern end of Route 79, the Fall River Viaduct, was replaced by the Massachusetts Department of Transportation with a new surface roadway. It was completed in 2016.

Discussions to permanently close the expressway portion of Route 79 began in the early 2000s, with local officials and residents calling for the expressway's removal by the early 2010s. Expressway removal advocates viewed the Western Fall River Expressway as a vestige of urban blight that had been induced by twentieth-century highway construction practices; city officials viewed the expressway as a preclusion to the economic development of Fall River's waterfront. In 2014, MassDOT completed an improvement study of the Route 79-Davol Street corridor. The study examined many options to improve safety, mobility, and connections to the Taunton riverfront; the study ultimately recommended an alternative that called for replacing Route 79 and Davol Street with an at-grade urban boulevard. The study found that Route 79 carried approximately between 20,000 and 30,000 vehicles per day with excess capacity; this gave MassDOT justification to commence preliminary planning to remove the four-lane elevated expressway in 2018. The expressway closed permanently on February 27, 2023, with demolition of the expressway commencing shortly after.

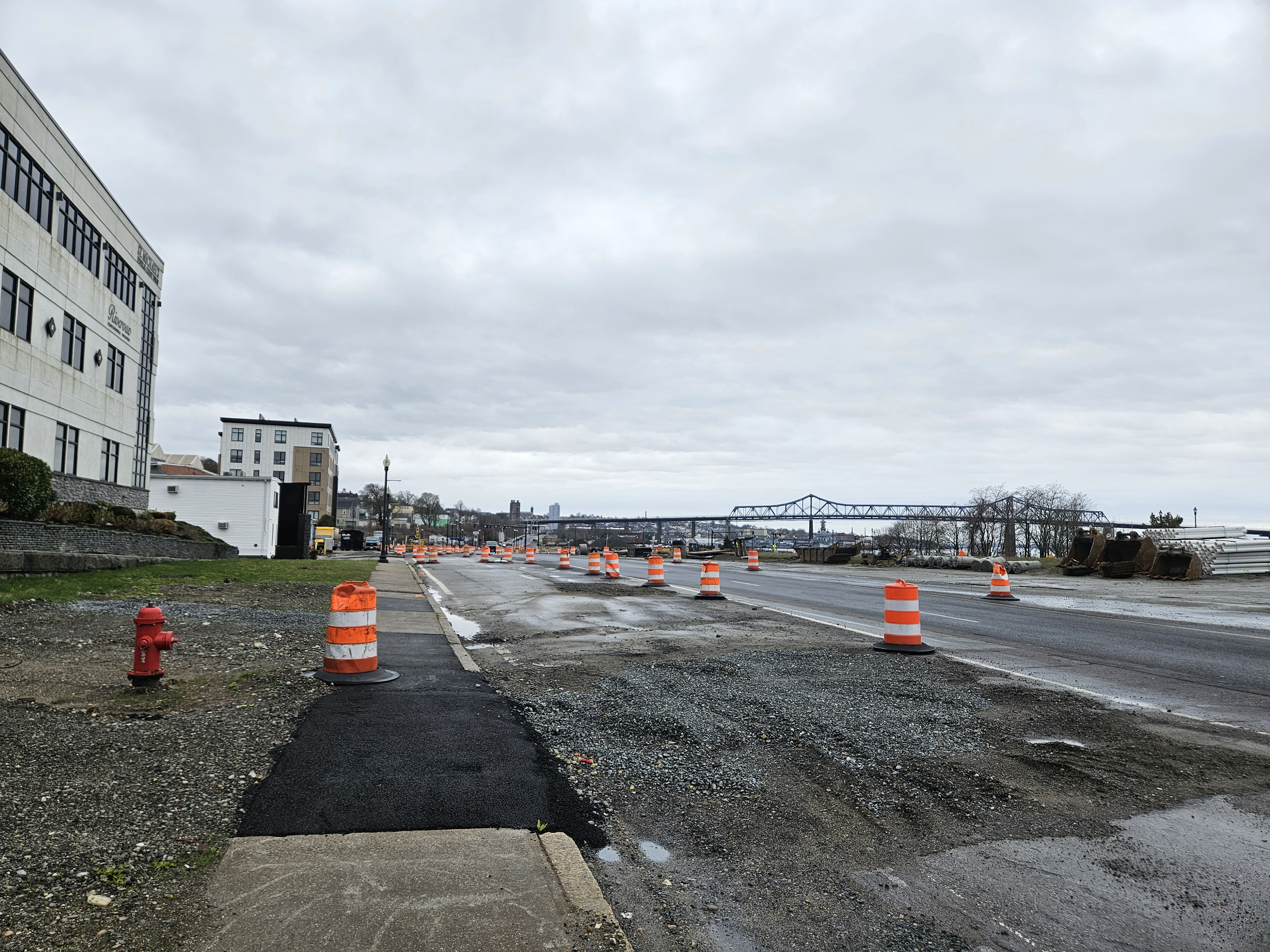
Route 79 during construction in 2025

The Route 79 Improvement Project seeks to reroute traffic onto existing surface streets and convert them to an urban boulevard; those surface streets will also get upgraded sidewalks, shared-use pathways, and crosswalks. The project will also build new cross streets to reconnect portions of the historic street grid (including Brightman Street, which was shortened as part of the construction of Veterans Memorial Bridge and interchanges) and improve access between the city's North End neighborhood and the riverfront. The project will free up almost 17 acres of riverfront land between the Senator Norton City Pier park and Brightman Street; additionally, most of the land is within walking distance of Fall River MBTA station, which opened in March 2025. Fall River economic development officials and local investors view the project as opportunity to create new housing in walkable neighborhoods on the newly available land that the expressway had formerly occupied. The Route 79 Improvement Project is projected to be complete in 2026.

== Major intersections ==
County	Location	mi	km	Old exit	New exit	Destinations	Notes
Bristol	Fall River	0.000	0.000	–	–	Route 138 south – North Tiverton, RI	Continuation south; southern end of Route 138 concurrency; closed from 2015 to 2016
Bristol	Fall River	0.000	0.000	–	–	I-195 – Providence, RI, New Bedford, Cape Cod	Exit 11 on I-195; intersection replaced original interchange closed in 2015 in 2016
Bristol	Fall River	0.936	1.506	–	–	US 6 east / North Davol Street	Northbound exit and southbound entrance; southern terminus from 2015 to 2016; northern end of southern freeway section since 2023
Bristol	Fall River	1.356	2.182	–	–	US 6 west / Route 138 north – North Fall River, Somerset	Northern end of Route 138 concurrency; to Veterans Memorial Bridge; opened in 2011 to replace a former diamond interchange; northbound ramps and a u tun ramp demolished in 2023 as part of freeway elimination/Davol Street reconstruction; southern end of northern freeway section since 2023; Routes 79 and 138 now both travel along the Davol Street one-way pair from the above partial interchange just south of Brownell Street in the south to just north of Brightman Street; Brightman Street is also accessed (unsigned) via this exit
Bristol	Fall River	2.303	3.706	–	–	North Main Street – North Fall River	
Bristol	Fall River	3.769	6.066	–	7	Route 24 south to I-195 – Newport, RI	Southern end of Route 24 concurrency; southbound exit and northbound entrance
Bristol	Fall River	4.356	7.010	8A	8	Airport Road / North Main Street	
Bristol	Assonet	5.756	9.263	8B	10	Innovation Way	Formerly Executive Park Drive; opened 2012
Bristol	Assonet	7.585	12.207	9	11	Route 24 north to I-495 – Boston	Northern end of Route 24 concurrency
Bristol	Assonet	7.585	12.207	Northern end of freeway section			
Bristol	Taunton	13.229– 13.392	21.290– 21.552			Route 140 – East Freetown, New Bedford, Taunton, Boston	Exit 16 on Route 140
Plymouth	Lakeville	17.070	27.472			Route 18 – Lakeville, Bridgewater, Brockton	
Plymouth	Lakeville	18.730	30.143			Route 105 to I-495 – Lakeville, Rochester, Middleboro Center	Northern terminus
1.000 mi = 1.609 km; 1.000 km = 0.621 mi: Concurrency terminus; Incomplete access
