= Massachusetts Route 138 =

North-south state highway in Massachusetts, US

Route 138
- Route 138 highlighted in red

Route information
- Maintained by MassDOT
- Length: 43.58 mi (70.14 km)

Major junctions
- South end: Route 138 at the Rhode Island state line in Fall River
- I-195 in Fall River; US 6 / Route 103 in Somerset; US 44 / Route 140 in Taunton; I-495 in Raynham; I-93 / US 1 in Canton
- North end: Route 28 in Milton

Location
- Country: United States
- State: Massachusetts
- Counties: Bristol, Norfolk

Highway system
- Massachusetts State Highway System; Interstate; US; State
| ← Route 137 | → Route 139 |

Route 138 is a 43.58-mile-long (70.14 km) north–south state highway in Massachusetts. From the state line in Tiverton, Rhode Island to Milton, Route 138 runs as an extension of Rhode Island Route 138, which is itself an extension of Connecticut Route 138. Route 138's northern terminus is at Route 28 in Milton.

== Route description ==
Running generally north, Route 138 crosses from Rhode Island into Fall River, where it meets the southern terminus of Route 79 at exit 11 (formerly 5) of Interstate 195, then begins a concurrency with Route 79 and later, U.S. Route 6. Routes 138 and 6 then travel off of Route 79 and over the Brightman Street Bridge into Somerset, where the concurrency with U.S. Route 6 splits at an intersection with Route 103. Route 138 proceeds through Dighton and into Taunton, intersecting Route 140 and U.S. Route 44 at Taunton Green. In Raynham, the route has an interchange with Interstate 495 at exit 22 (formerly 8) before continuing into Easton, where it intersects Route 106 before beginning a brief concurrency with Route 123 near Stonehill College. Route 138 meets the western terminus of Route 139 at the beginning of an extremely short concurrency with Route 27 in downtown Stoughton, before crossing into Canton and meeting Interstate 93/U.S. 1 at exit 2 (Exit 2A is for Route 138 south, while 2B is for Route 138 North). The route finally enters Milton, travels by Curry College and the Neponset Valley Parkway, and terminates at Route 28, directly before that route crosses the Neponset River and enters Boston.

== History ==
Until the late 1960s - early 1970's, Route 138 was multiplexed with Route 28 on Blue Hill Avenue to Route 3 (now MA 203) on Morton Street, then to the Arborway and the Jamaicaway. Route 138 turned off onto Brookline Avenue at intersection of the Jamaicaway (where it became the Riverway) and continued to end at US Route 20 and Route 30 in Kenmore Square.

During the Blizzard of 1978, Route 138's intersection with Interstate 93 (which at the time still had Route 128 concurrent with it) gained some notoriety as the location shot of photos taken featuring cars trapped in the snow along the underpassing freeway.

Parts of Route 138 follows the route of the "Old Bay Road," which was the earliest line of travel between Boston and Taunton.

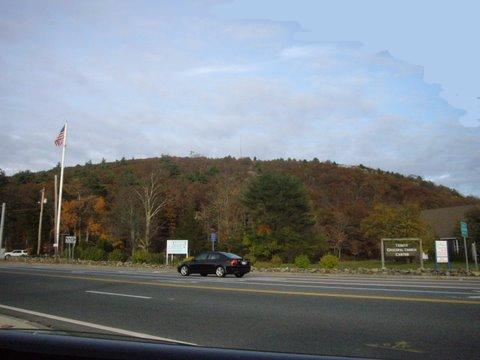
Route 138 at the foot of Great Blue Hill

== Major intersections ==
| County | Location | mi | km | Destinations | Notes |
|---|---|---|---|---|---|
| Bristol | Fall River | 0.0 | 0.0 | Route 138 south – North Tiverton | Continuation into Rhode Island |
| Bristol | Fall River | 2.4 | 3.9 | I-195 – New Bedford, Providence, RI Route 79 begins | Southern terminus of Route 79; exit 11 on I-195 |
| Bristol | Fall River | 2.9 | 4.7 | US 6 east (North Davol Street) | Southern end of US 6 concurrency |
| Bristol | Fall River | 3.5 | 5.6 | Route 79 north to Route 24 – Taunton, Middleboro | Northern end of Route 79 concurrency |
| Bristol | Somerset | 4.9 | 7.9 | US 6 west / Route 103 west – Swansea, Warren, RI | Northern end of US 6 concurrency; western terminus of Route 103 |
| Bristol | Taunton | 17.9 | 28.8 | US 44 / Route 140 – New Bedford, Cape Cod, Seekonk, Norton, Mansfield, Foxboro | Taunton Green |
| Bristol | Raynham | 22.1 | 35.6 | I-495 to Route 24 – Middleboro, Cape Cod, Mansfield, Marlboro | Exit 22 on I-495 |
| Bristol | Easton | 25.7 | 41.4 | Route 106 to Route 24 – West Bridgewater, Boston, Halifax, Mansfield | |
| Bristol | Easton | 28.0 | 45.1 | Route 123 west – Easton, Norton | Southern end of Route 123 concurrency |
| Bristol | Easton | 28.6 | 46.0 | Route 123 east – Brockton, Abington | Northern end of Route 123 concurrency |
| Norfolk | Stoughton | 33.9 | 54.6 | Route 27 south / Route 139 east – Brockton, Whitman, Randolph, Holbrook | Southern end of Route 27 concurrency; western terminus of Route 139 |
| Norfolk | Stoughton | 34.0 | 54.7 | Route 27 north – Sharon, Walpole | Northern end of Route 27 concurrency |
| Norfolk | Canton | 39.5 | 63.6 | I-93 / US 1 to I-95 north (Route 128 north) – Braintree, Boston, Dedham | Exits 2A-B on I-93; former Route 128 |
| Norfolk | Milton | 44.1 | 71.0 | Route 28 – Milton, Boston | Northern terminus outside Mattapan Square |
1.000 mi = 1.609 km; 1.000 km = 0.621 mi: Concurrency terminus
