= Massachusetts Route 104 =

Highway in Massachusetts, USA

Route 104
- Route 104 highlighted in red

Route information
- Maintained by MassDOT
- Length: 12.54 mi (20.18 km)
- Existed: by 1933–present

Major junctions
- West end: US 44 in Taunton: Route 24 in Bridgewater; Route 18 / Route 28 in Bridgewater
- East end: Route 106 in East Bridgewater

Location
- Country: United States
- State: Massachusetts
- Counties: Bristol, Plymouth

Highway system
- Massachusetts State Highway System; Interstate; US; State
← Route 103	→ Route 105

Route 104 is a 12.54-mile-long (20.18 km) west–east highway in southeastern Massachusetts. Its western terminus is at U.S. Route 44 (US 44) in Taunton and its eastern terminus is at Route 106 in East Bridgewater.

== Route description ==
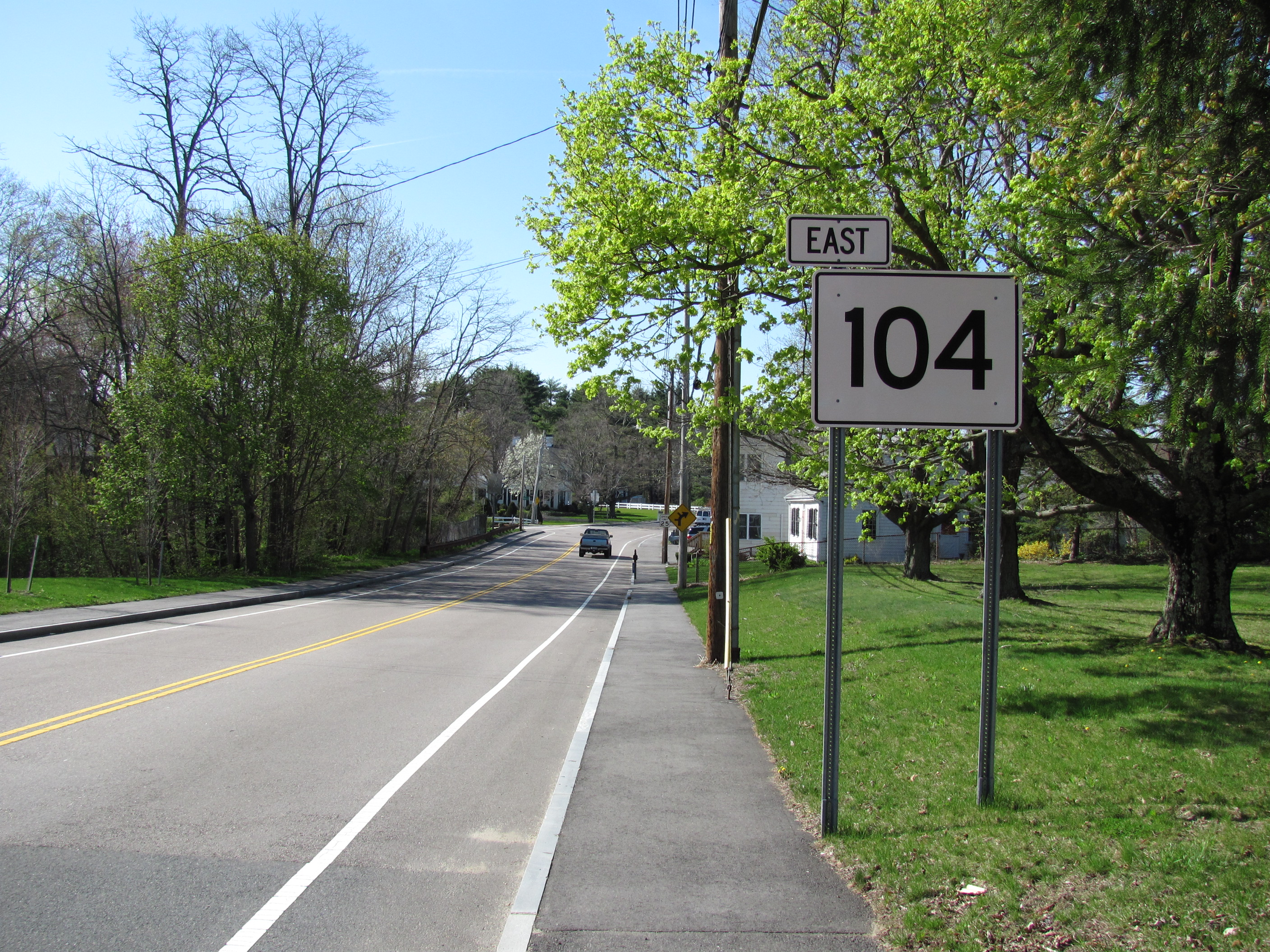
Route 104 eastbound in Raynham

Route 104 begins at U.S. Route 44 in Taunton. The highway crosses less than a thousand feet later thereafter into Raynham and passes through Raynham Center. The highway crosses over Interstate 495 without an interchange, enters Bridgewater, abuts the southern shore of Lake Nippenicket and intersects with Route 24, all within a space of about one mile (1.6 km). Route 104 then goes through the center of Bridgewater, intersecting with the northern end of the Route 18 and 28 concurrency in a three-route concurrency for a short distance which is signed as a rotary. Just east of the rotary is the location of Bridgewater State University. The highway then passes by the source of the Taunton River and ends at Route 106 in East Bridgewater astride the East Bridgewater/Bridgewater town line.

== Major intersections ==
County	Location	mi	km	Destinations	Notes
Bristol	Taunton	0.00	0.00	US 44 – Middleboro, Taunton, Providence, RI	Western terminus
Plymouth	Bridgewater	5.20	8.37	Route 24 – Taunton, Fall River, Randolph, Boston	Route 24 Exit 24; To I-495 via Route 24 south
Plymouth	Bridgewater	8.60	13.84	Route 18 south / Route 28 south – Middleboro, Cape Cod, Lakeville	Signed as a rotary; southern terminus of Route 18 and Route 28 concurrency
Plymouth	Bridgewater	8.70	14.00	Route 18 north / Route 28 north – Quincy, Boston, Brockton	Signed as a rotary; northern terminus of Route 18 and Route 28 concurrency
Plymouth	East Bridgewater	12.54	20.18	Route 106 – Easton, Plainville, Halifax	Eastern terminus
1.000 mi = 1.609 km; 1.000 km = 0.621 mi: Closed/former; Concurrency terminus
