= Massachusetts Route 105 =

State highway in southeastern Massachusetts, US

Route 105
- Route 105 highlighted in red

Route information
- Maintained by MassDOT
- Length: 29.36 mi (47.25 km)
- Existed: 1930, 1971 (current alignment)–present

Major junctions
- South end: US 6 in Marion
- I-195 in Marion; I-495 / US 44 in Middleborough
- North end: Route 106 in Halifax

Location
- Country: United States
- State: Massachusetts
- Counties: Plymouth, Bristol

Highway system
- Massachusetts State Highway System; Interstate; US; State
| ← Route 104 | → Route 106 |

Route 105 is a 29.36-mile-long (47.25 km) state highway in southeastern Massachusetts, running from Marion to Halifax in a generally north–south direction. Its southern terminus is at U.S. Route 6 (US 6) in Marion and its northern terminus is at Route 106 in Halifax. Along the way it intersects Interstate 195 (I-195) in Marion and Interstate 495 and US 44 in Middleborough.

== Route description ==
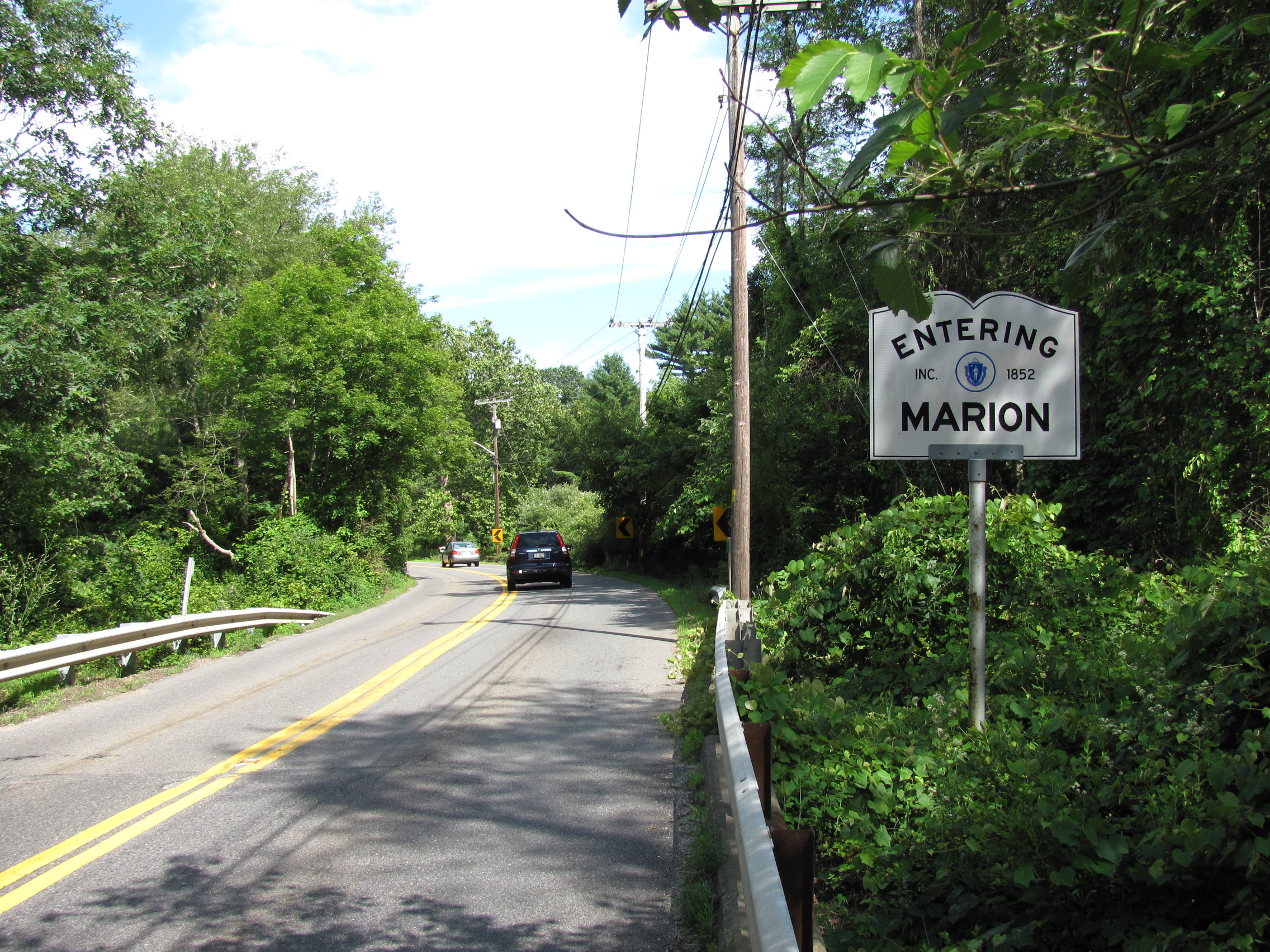
Route 105 southbound entering Marion

Route 105 begins at U.S. Route 6 in Marion. The highway crosses over I-195 less than a mile into its journey. The highway winds in a westerly direction through Rochester. When the highway enters Long Plain village in Acushnet, the only town in Bristol County on the route, Route 105 turns in a northerly direction. The highway returns into Rochester and enters Lakeville between Little Quittacas and Great Quittacas Ponds. Route 18 joins Route 105 for a 2.7-mile (4.3 km) concurrency, running along the western shore of Assawompset Pond. Route 105 then shoots off in a northeasterly direction into Middleborough through the town's center and, after its intersection with U.S. Route 44, turns in a northerly direction through East Middleborough, going past Oak Point along the way. The highway ends at Route 106 in Halifax west of the town's center.

== History ==
When U.S. Route 44 bypassed Middleborough in the early 1960s, Route 105 took over the former Route 44 as far as Thompson Street, and eventually was extended north along Thompson Street to Halifax.

== Major intersections ==
| County | Location | mi | km | Destinations | Notes |
|---|---|---|---|---|---|
| Plymouth | Marion | 0.0 | 0.0 | US 6 – Wareham, Buzzards Bay, Mattapoisett | Southern terminus |
| Plymouth | Marion | 0.7 | 1.1 | I-195 – Wareham, Cape Cod, Fairhaven, New Bedford | Exit 35 on I-195 |
| Bristol | No major junctions | | | | |
| Plymouth | Lakeville | 13.8 | 22.2 | Route 18 south – East Freetown, New Bedford | Southern terminus of concurrency with Route 18 |
| Plymouth | Lakeville | 16.5 | 26.6 | Route 18 north – Boston | Northern terminus of concurrency with Route 18 |
| Plymouth | Lakeville | 19.3 | 31.1 | Route 79 south – Freetown, Fall River | Northern terminus of Route 79 |
| Plymouth | Middleborough | 19.4 | 31.2 | I-495 – Wareham, Cape Cod, Taunton, Marlboro | Exit 12 on I-495 |
| Plymouth | Middleborough | 19.8 | 31.9 | Route 28 – Bridgewater, Boston, Wareham | |
| Plymouth | Middleborough | 22.5 | 36.2 | US 44 – Taunton, Providence, RI, Carver, Plymouth | |
| Plymouth | Halifax | 29.36 | 47.25 | Route 106 – Bridgewater, Halifax, Kingston | Northern terminus |
1.000 mi = 1.609 km; 1.000 km = 0.621 mi: Concurrency terminus
