= Massachusetts Route 27 =

Highway in Massachusetts, United States

Route 27
- Route 27 highlighted in red

Route information
- Maintained by MassDOT
- Length: 73.4403 mi (118.1907 km)
- Existed: by 1933–present

Major junctions
- South end: Route 106 in Kingston
- Route 24 in Brockton; U.S. Route 1 in Walpole; Route 9 in Natick; U.S. Route 20 in Wayland; Route 2 in Acton
- North end: Route 4, Route 110, Route 129 in Chelmsford

Location
- Country: United States
- State: Massachusetts
- Counties: Plymouth, Norfolk, Middlesex

Highway system
- Massachusetts State Highway System; Interstate; US; State
← Route 25	→ Route 28

Route 27 is a 73.44-mile-long (118.19 km) south–north state highway in eastern Massachusetts. Its southern terminus is at Route 106 in Kingston and its northern terminus is at Route 4 in Chelmsford. Along the way it intersects several major highways including Route 24 in Brockton, U.S. Route 1 (US 1) in Walpole, Route 9 in Natick, US 20 in Wayland, Route 225 in Westford, Route 2, Route 119, Route 2A, and Route 111 all in Acton.

Route 30 in Wayland, Route 135 in Natick,

== Route description ==
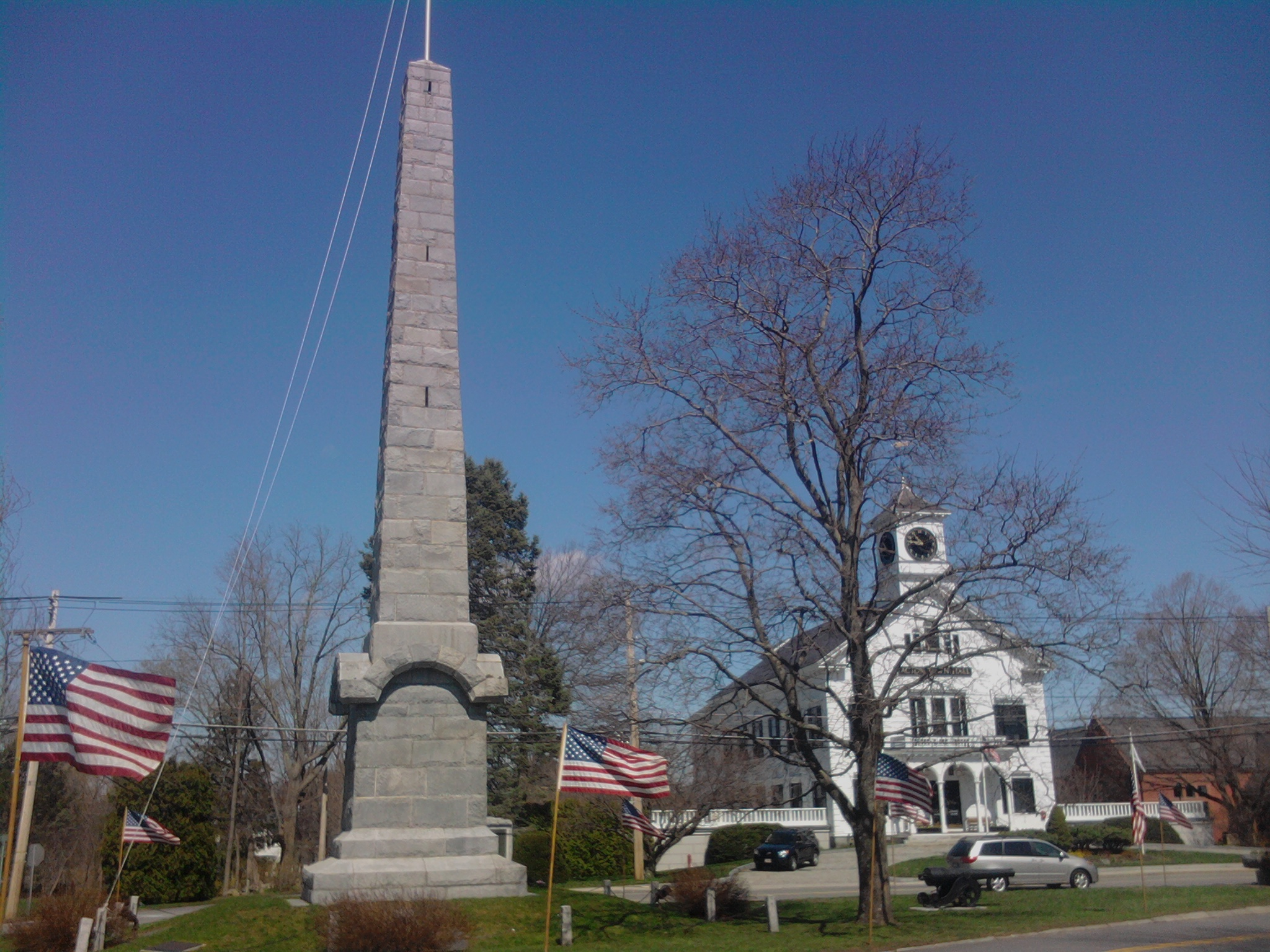
The Isaac Davis Monument and Acton Town Hall, located along Route 27

Route 27 runs in a sweeping arc from Kingston to Chelmsford. For most of its route, it acts as an intermediate route between Interstate 95 and Interstate 495.

Route 27 begins in Kingston at Route 106, approximately 1 1/4 miles west of Route 3. It heads northwest towards Brockton, passing through Pembroke, Hanson, East Bridgewater and Whitman. In Brockton the road shares a triple concurrency with Route 28 and Route 123 Eastbound (Route 123 Westbound only intersects with the route). From the center of town, Route 27 heads northwest, past the Westgate Mall, over Route 24 at Exits 33A-B (formerly 18A-B), and past Good Samaritan Hospital before passing into Norfolk County via Stoughton.

In Stoughton, the road has a brief concurrency with Route 138 in the center of town. It passes just south of the town of Canton before making a large loop through the town of Sharon. It crosses over Interstate 95 without access, between Exits 19 and 21 (formerly 9 and 10 respectively), both of which are accessible via US Route 1 nearby. It then crosses through Walpole and Medfield before crossing the Charles River into Middlesex County and the town of Sherborn.

In Sherborn, the road begins a more northerly direction, with a short concurrency with Route 16 in the center of town. The road heads through the center of Natick, passing the town green and crossing Route 135, which carries the Boston Marathon at that point. Route 27 crosses over Route 9 with a four-way exit ramp system, just east of Lake Cochituate, the Natick Mall and the Golden Triangle retail area. Route 27 passes into Wayland and under the Massachusetts Turnpike, which it accesses via Route 30, just north of the Pike.

In Wayland, Route 27 has a 1.2-mile concurrency with Route 126, passing through the center of town and intersecting US Route 20. The road then crosses the Sudbury River into Sudbury and through the historic town center. It passes into Maynard, having a short, 0.1-mile concurrency with Route 62 over the Assabet River, before heading north into Acton. It crosses Route 2 at Exit 117 (formerly 42) before crossing through the town center, past the Isaac Davis Monument. It sweeps by Carlisle before directly crossing into Westford, passing through the southeast corner of town before heading into Chelmsford. Route 27 ends at the center of town, at the intersection of Routes 4, 110 and 129, just south of Interstate 495, 3A and U.S. Route 3.

== History ==
Route 27's original form was identical to the modern route south of Wayland, with the exception of a bypass built in 1973 from the Charles River at the Sherborn-Medfield line to Route 109 in Medfield center.

North of Wayland the route followed current Route 126 into Concord. It came into its current form by 1939. However, historical maps from the U.S. Department of the Interior from 1943 show Route 27 running concurrent with US 20 from Wayland Center to Concord Road in Sudbury, then following Concord Road to Sudbury Center, where it resumed its current alignment on Hudson Road.

== Major intersections ==
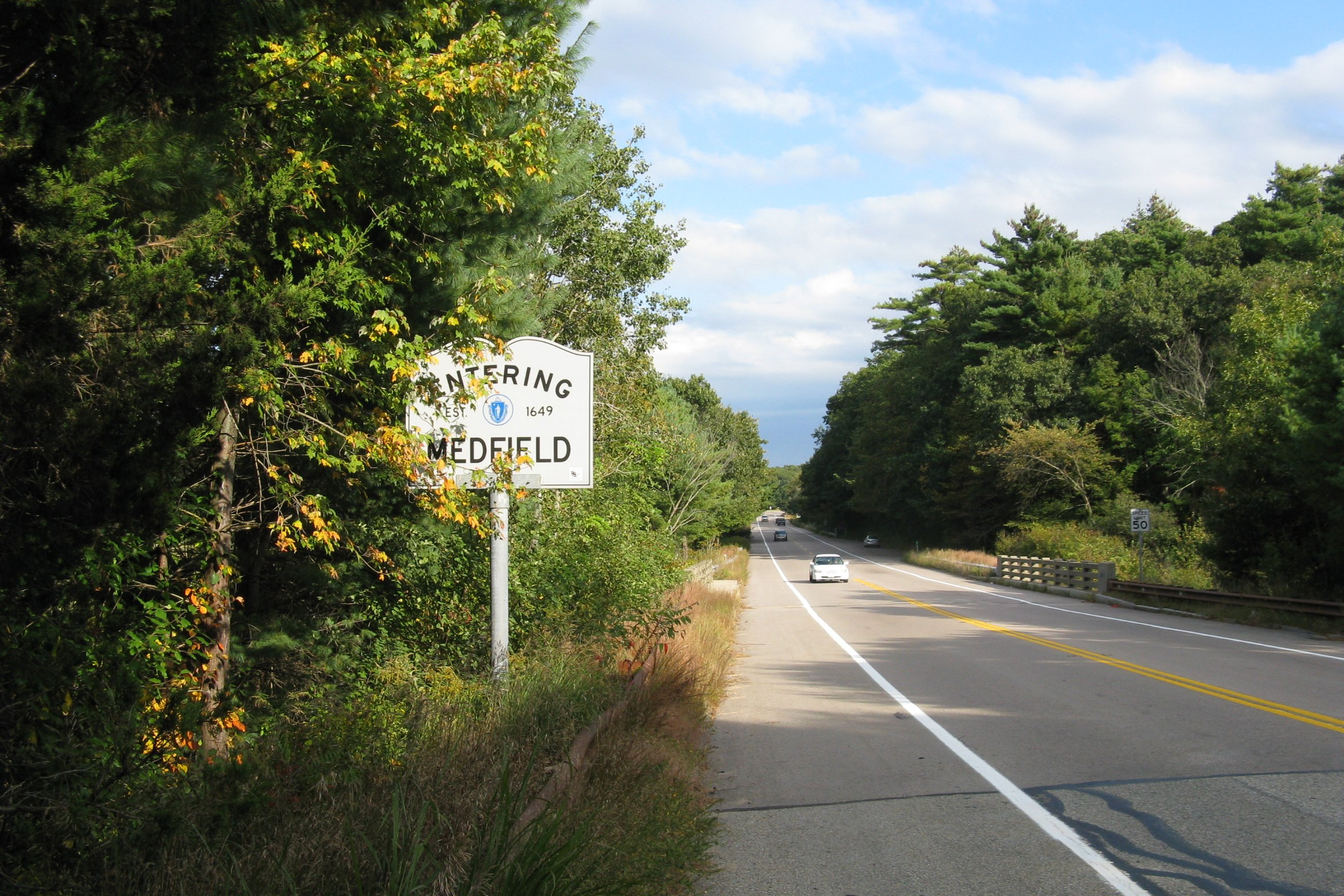
Southbound entering Medfield

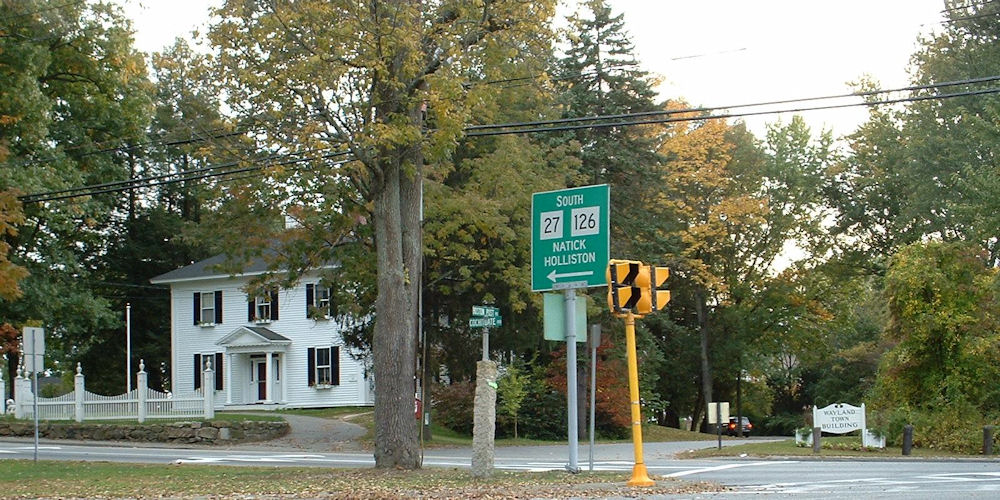
Junction of US 20, MA 27 & MA 126

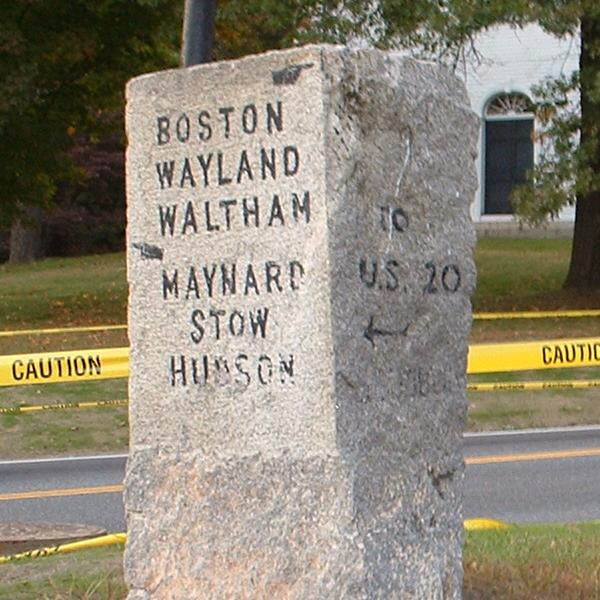
Granite road sign in Sudbury. The left side marks Route 27.

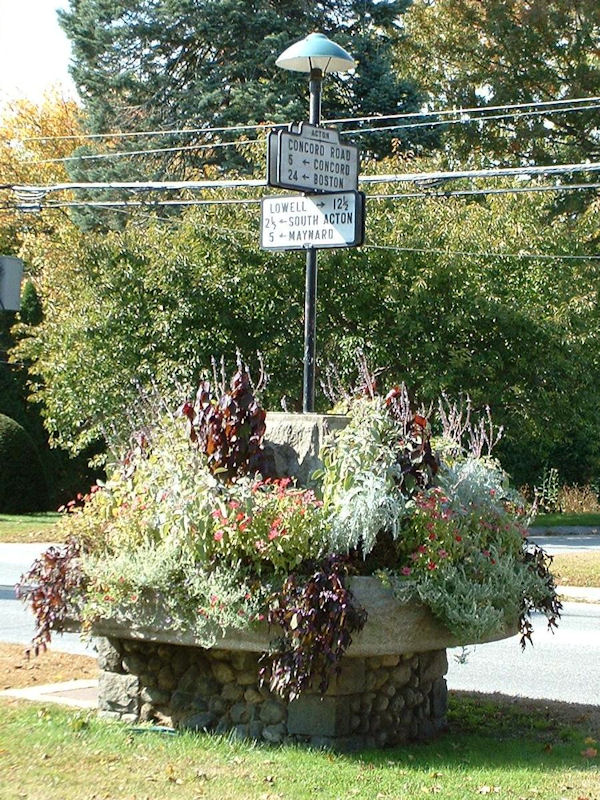
Antique road signs in a well in Acton

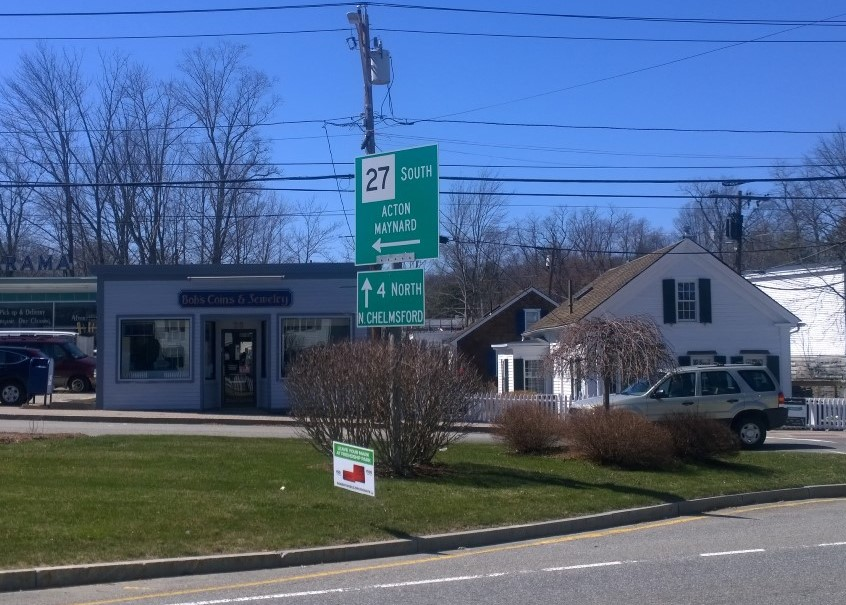
Northern terminus of Route 27 in Chelmsford

County	Location	mi	km	Destinations	Notes
Plymouth	Kingston	0.00	0.00	Route 106 to Route 3 / Route 3A / Route 53 / Route 80 / US 44 – Kingston, Plympton, Halifax	Southern terminus
Plymouth	Pembroke	5.6	9.0	Route 36	
Plymouth	Hanson	7.4	11.9	Route 58 – Halifax, Wareham, Hanson	
Plymouth	East Bridgewater	10.8	17.4	Route 14 – East Bridgewater, Brockton	
Plymouth	Whitman	14.4	23.2	Route 18 – Bridgewater, New Bedford, Abington, South Weymouth	
Plymouth	Brockton	16.2	26.1	Route 14 east – Hanson, Duxbury	Western terminus of Route 14
Plymouth	Brockton	18.1	29.1	Route 28 south / Route 123 south – Bridgewater, Cape Cod	Southern terminus of concurrency with Routes 28 and 123 (southbound only)
Plymouth	Brockton	18.2	29.3	Route 28 / Route 123 east – Abington, Norwell	Northern terminus of concurrency with Route 123 (southbound only)
Plymouth	Brockton	18.3	29.5	Route 28 north – Randolph	Northern terminus of concurrency with Route 28
Plymouth	Brockton	20.4	32.8	Route 24 – Randolph, Boston, Taunton, Fall River	Exits 33A-B on Route 24
Norfolk	Stoughton	23.9	38.5	Route 138 south / Route 139 east – Taunton, Randolph	Southern terminus of concurrency with Route 138; western terminus of Route 139
Norfolk	Stoughton	24.0	38.6	Route 138 north – Canton, Boston	Northern terminus of concurrency with Route 138; no southbound access to Route 138 north
Norfolk	Sharon	31.5	50.7	To I-95 north – Boston	Access via Norwood Street To US 1 via north in Walpole
Norfolk	Walpole	31.8	51.2	US 1 to I-95 south – Norwood, Dedham, Providence, RI	
Norfolk	Walpole	33.7	54.2	Route 1A – Norwood, Norfolk	
Norfolk	Medfield	37.9	61.0	Route 109 – Dover, Westwood, Millis	
Charles River		40.8	65.7	Bridge	
Middlesex	Sherborn	41.1	66.1	Route 115 south – Millis, Norfolk	Northern terminus of Route 115
Middlesex	Sherborn	43.5	70.0	Route 16 west – Holliston, Milford	Southern terminus of Route 16 concurrency
Middlesex	Sherborn	43.8	70.5	Route 16 east – South Natick, Newton	Northern terminus of Route 16 concurrency
Middlesex	Natick	46.7	75.2	Route 135 – Wellesley, Needham, Framingham, Hopkinton	
Middlesex	Natick	48.0	77.2	Route 9 – Wellesley Hills, Boston, Framingham, Worcester	Grade-separated interchange
Middlesex	Wayland	49.3	79.3	Route 30 to I-90 – Framingham, Southboro, Weston, Boston	Access to Mass Pike via Route 30 west
Middlesex	Wayland	51.5	82.9	Route 126 south (Old Connecticut Road) – Framingham, Ashland	Southern terminus of Route 126 concurrency
Middlesex	Wayland	52.6	84.7	US 20 – Marlboro, Boston	
Middlesex	Wayland	52.9	85.1	Route 126 north (Concord Road) – Lincoln, Concord	Northern terminus of Route 126 concurrency
Middlesex	Maynard	59.3	95.4	Route 117 – Weston, Waltham, Stow, Leominster	
Middlesex	Maynard	60.0	96.6	Route 62 – Concord, Stow	0.1-mile-long (0.2 km) concurrency
Middlesex	Acton	63.1	101.5	Route 111 – Boxboro, Concord	Additional access to Route 2 east via Route 111 south
Middlesex	Acton	63.4	102.0	Route 2 – Cambridge, Boston, Fitchburg, Greenfield	Interchange; exit 117 on Route 2
Middlesex	Acton	65.7	105.7	Route 2A / Route 119 – East Acton, Concord, Groton, Ayer	
Middlesex	Westford	68.5	110.2	Route 225 – Westford, Groton, Carlisle, Bedford	
Middlesex	Chelmsford	73.44	118.19	Route 4 to Route 110 / Route 129 / I-495 / US 3 / Route 3A – Bedford, Lexington, Lowell, Nashua, NH	Northern terminus
1.000 mi = 1.609 km; 1.000 km = 0.621 mi: Concurrency terminus
