= Massachusetts Route 106 =

State highway in southeastern Massachusetts, US

Route 106
- Route 106 highlighted in red

Route information
- Maintained by MassDOT
- Length: 34.31 mi (55.22 km)

Major junctions
- West end: Route 1A in Plainville
- US 1 in Plainville; Route 140 in Mansfield; Route 24 in West Bridgewater
- East end: Route 3A in Kingston

Location
- Country: United States
- State: Massachusetts
- Counties: Norfolk, Bristol, Plymouth

Highway system
- Massachusetts State Highway System; Interstate; US; State
← Route 105	→ Route 107

Route 106 is a 34.31-mile-long (55.22 km) west–east highway in southeastern Massachusetts, United States. Its western terminus is at Route 1A in Plainville and its eastern terminus is at Route 3A in Kingston. Along the way it intersects U.S. Route 1 (US 1) in Plainville.

== Route description ==
Route 106 begins in Plainville at Route 1A. The route heads east, intersecting U.S. Route 1 and Route 152 in quick succession, with Turnpike Lake between the three routes. As Route 106 passes south of Lake Mirimichi it enters the town of Foxborough. In Foxborough, Route 106 passes over I-495 and under I-95 within three quarters of a mile without access to either interstate. The road crosses into Mansfield in Bristol County, where it intersects Route 140 between the two interstates.

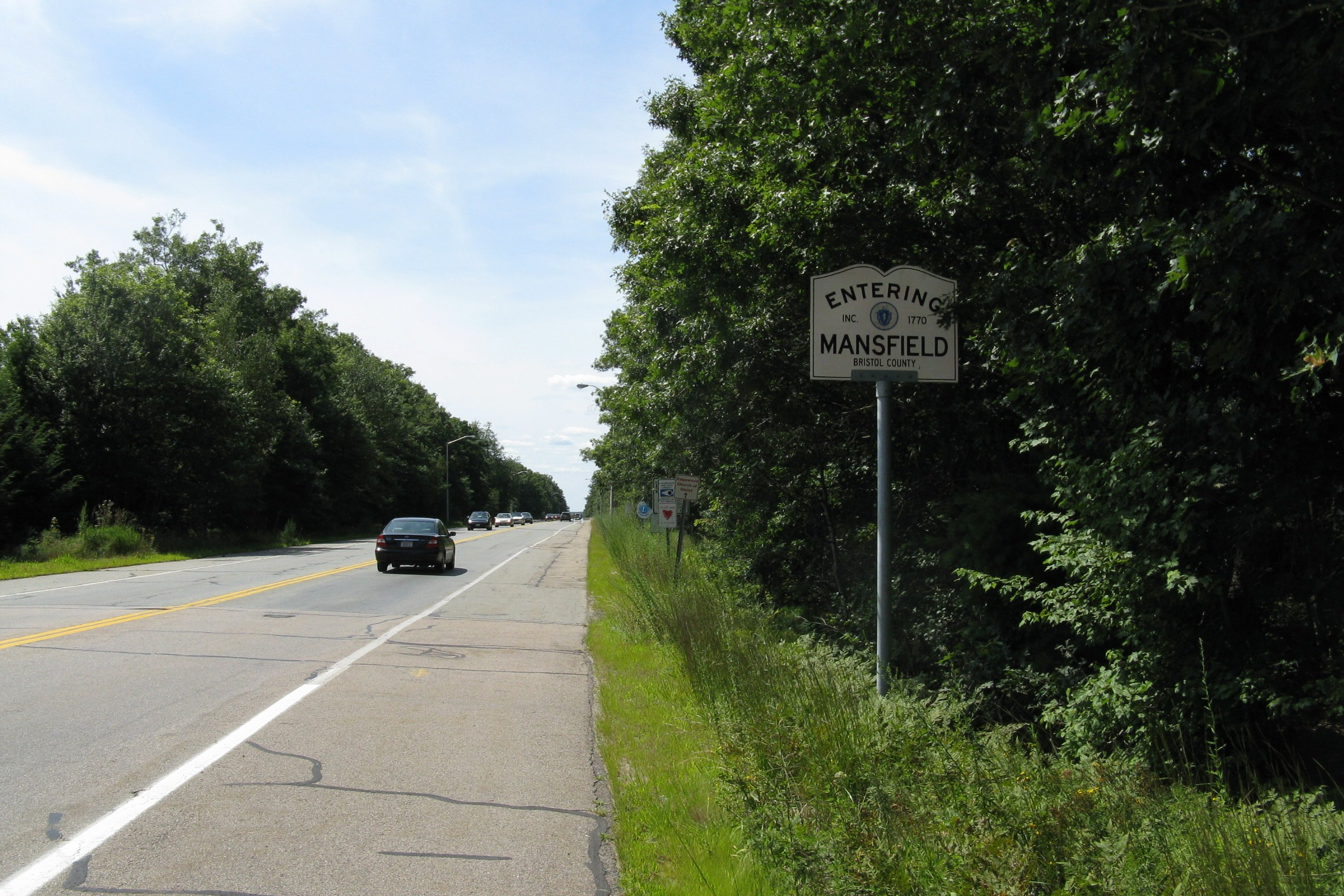
Westbound entering Mansfield

Route 106 continues eastward through the town, crossing under the Northeast Corridor in downtown Mansfield. It then enters Easton, where it becomes concurrent with Route 123 for a mile, crossing Bay Road at the Five Corners, where the two routes split. It then crosses Route 138 before entering West Bridgewater in Plymouth County.

In West Bridgewater, Route 106 crosses Route 24 at Exits 28 A-B. Near the center of town it crosses Route 28. It crosses the Middleborough Main Line as it enters East Bridgewater. In East Bridgewater, Route 106 shares a short, quarter-mile concurrency with Route 18 in the village of Elmwood. It continues eastward, following the Bridgewater town line as intersects the eastern end of Route 104. The route enters Halifax, passing through swampland as it intersects the northern end of Route 105. It passes through the center of town before intersecting with Route 58 south of the Monponsett Ponds. Near the southeast corner of East Monponsett Pond, Route 106 meets the southern end of Route 36.

Route 106 continues eastward, passing through the northern end of Plympton before entering Kingston. The route continues towards the center of town, meeting the southern end of Route 27 before finally meeting its eastern end at Route 3A near the center of town, just a half mile west of Route 3's Exit 18.

== Major intersections ==
County	Location	mi	km	Destinations	Notes
Norfolk	Plainville	0.00	0.00	Route 1A – Wrentham, Norwood, North Attleboro	Western terminus
Norfolk	Plainville	0.7	1.1	US 1 – North Attleboro, Providence, RI, Boston	
Norfolk	Plainville	1.6	2.6	Route 152 – Attleboro, Seekonk, Wrentham, Boston	
Bristol	Mansfield	5.8	9.3	Route 140 to I-495 / I-95 – Foxboro, Wrentham, Norton, Taunton	
Bristol	Easton	10.7	17.2	Route 123 west – Norton, Attleboro	Western end of Route 123 concurrency
Bristol	Easton	11.8	19.0	Route 123 east – Brockton, Stoughton	Eastern end of Route 123 concurrency at Bay Road
Bristol	Easton	14.8	23.8	Route 138 – Raynham, Taunton, Stoughton	
Plymouth	West Bridgewater	16.0	25.7	Route 24 – Taunton, Fall River, Randolph, Boston	Exits 28A-B on Route 24
Plymouth	West Bridgewater	17.9	28.8	Route 28 – Brockton, Middleboro	
Plymouth	East Bridgewater	20.4	32.8	Route 18 south – Bridgewater	Southern end of Route 18 concurrency
Plymouth	East Bridgewater	20.6	33.2	Route 18 north – Weymouth	Northern end of Route 18 concurrency
Plymouth	East Bridgewater	24.0	38.6	Route 104 west – Bridgewater	Eastern terminus of Route 104
Plymouth	Halifax	26.0	41.8	Route 105 south – Middleboro, Lakeville	Northern terminus of Route 105
Plymouth	Halifax	27.6	44.4	Route 58 – Plympton, Carver, Hanson	
Plymouth	Halifax	28.3	45.5	Route 36 north – Pembroke, Brant Rock	Southern terminus of Route 36
Plymouth	Kingston	33.5	53.9	Route 27 north – Pembroke, Brockton; Evergreen Street	Southern terminus of Route 27; to Route 3A north and Route 53 via Evergreen Street
Plymouth	Kingston	34.31	55.22	Route 3A to Route 3 / Route 53 / Route 80 / US 44	Eastern terminus: eastbound traffic defaults onto Route 3A south without access onto Route 3A north
1.000 mi = 1.609 km; 1.000 km = 0.621 mi: Concurrency terminus; Incomplete access
