= Massachusetts Route 24 =

North-south state highway in Massachusetts, US

Route 24
- AMVETS Memorial Highway; Fall River Expressway
- Route 24 highlighted in red

Route information
- Maintained by MassDOT
- Length: 40.91 mi (65.84 km)
- Existed: 1951–present

Major junctions
- South end: Route 24 at the Rhode Island state line in Fall River
- Route 81 in Fall River; I-195 in Fall River; Route 79 in Fall River and Freetown; Route 140 in Taunton; US 44 in Raynham; I-495 in Bridgewater; Route 123 in Brockton
- North end: I-93 / US 1 in Randolph

Location
- Country: United States
- State: Massachusetts
- Counties: Bristol, Plymouth, Norfolk

Highway system
- Massachusetts State Highway System; Interstate; US; State
← Route 23	→ Route 25

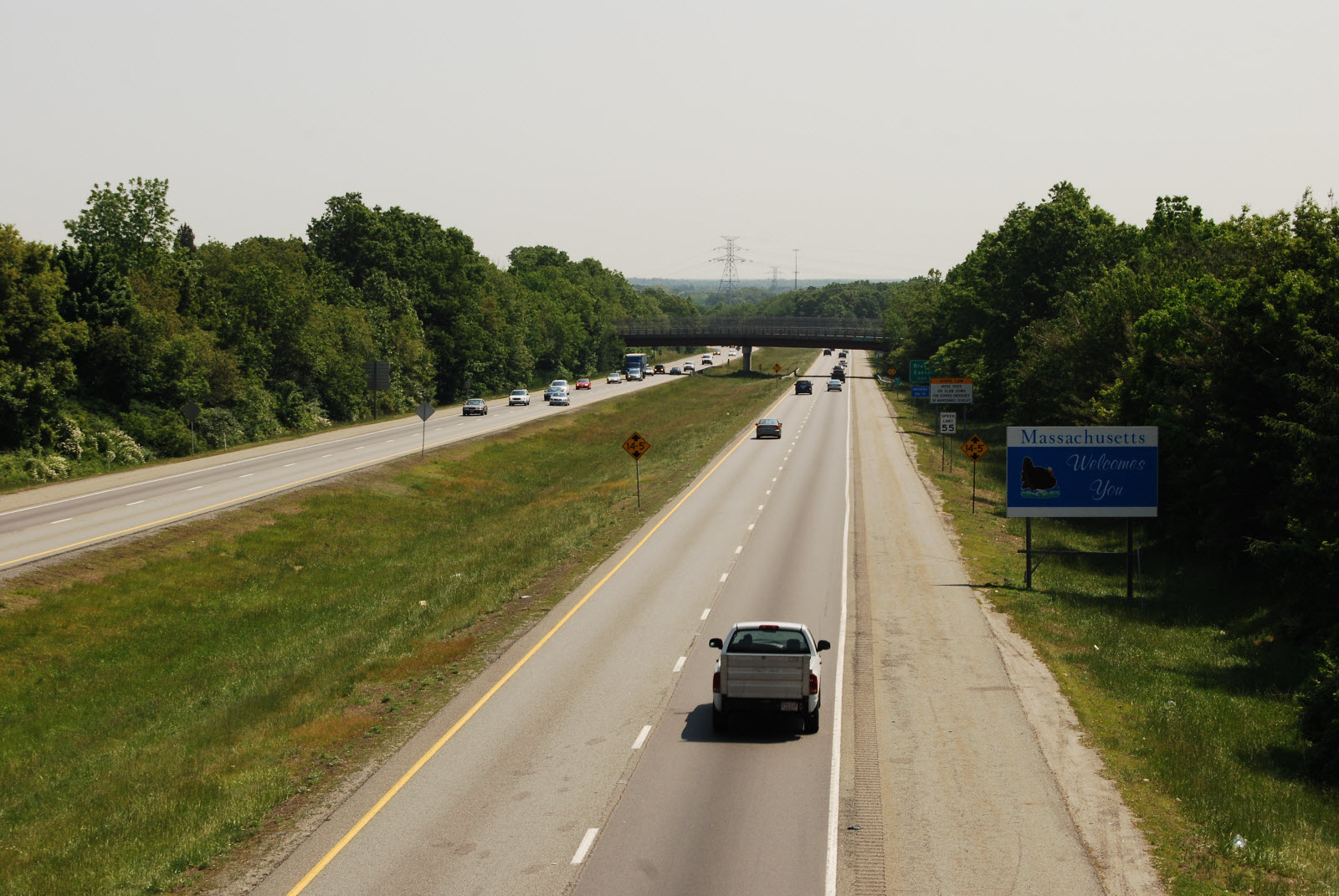
View of Route 24 from Stafford Road overpass, Fall River, Massachusetts

Route 24 is a 40.91-mile-long (65.84 km) freeway south of Interstate 93 (I-93) in southeastern Massachusetts, linking Fall River with the Boston metropolitan area. It begins in the south in Fall River at the border with Tiverton, Rhode Island, and runs north to an interchange with I-93/US 1 in Randolph. Route 24 is also known as the Fall River Expressway, and officially as the Amvets Highway. Route 24 has a total of 21 interchanges (including the split at its northern terminus with I-93.)

Route 24 connects many of the major cities of Southeastern Massachusetts with Boston and Providence: Brockton, Taunton, Fall River, and New Bedford (via the junction with Route 140).

== Route description ==
The highway continues at the Rhode Island border at Rhode Island Route 24 and meets Interstate 195 in Fall River. It briefly runs concurrently with I-195 east (for less than a mile), then exits the interstate and travels north, merging with Route 79 at Exit 7 in northern Fall River. Routes 24 and 79 run concurrently northward until Exit 9 (Assonet). At this point, Route 79 exits the freeway and heads northeast. Route 24 continues north, intersecting the northern end of the Taunton-New Bedford Expressway (Route 140) in Taunton, and Interstate 495 in Bridgewater. The highway continues north through the city of Brockton and into Randolph, where Route 24 ends at a split junction with Interstate 93. This section of I-93 from Braintree to its junction with I-95 is frequently, yet erroneously, referred to by its former designation of Route 128. This designation was removed from I-93 in 1989, when the roadway obtained the additional designation of U.S. Route 1, although this is not shown on exit signs from Route 24. The route is officially 40.9 miles in length, however, mileposts continue up to 41.2 on the Exit 41B ramp to I-93 south.

The speed limit on Route 24 is 55 mph (89 km/h) from the Rhode Island border to the exit from Interstate 195. North of I-195, the speed limit is 65 mph (105 km/h), excluding a short drop to 60 mph (97 km/h) at the 79 merge northbound.

Service plazas are located on either side of Route 24 in Bridgewater.

== History ==
Route 24, along with Route 138, are both built parallel to an old Native American trail that went along the same north/south route from south of the Boston area into Boston. Route 124 on Cape Cod was originally designated Route 24 before 1951, and its number was changed to 124 upon the completion of the initial stretch of the Route 24 freeway.

The original portion of Route 24 opened in 1951, and brought commuters from Exit 10 in Assonet to Raynham. Route 24 is currently 40 miles (65 km) in length and has 21 interchanges from Fall River to Randolph.

== Efforts to upgrade to Interstate standards ==
There have been calls over the years for Route 24 to be upgraded to an interstate highway. In 1997, a study was initiated by the Massachusetts Highway Department (MHD) and the SRPEDD on what improvements were necessary in order to convert the route to an Interstate highway. The project would require major upgrades to 11 interchanges and minor work on 6 others, and the plan was halted due to high costs. In April 2007, the Old Colony Regional Planning Council included this proposal in its 25-year regional transportation plan draft. The Southeastern Regional Planning and Economic Development District (SRPEDD) endorsed a similar proposal the month before which if built, according to a MassHighway official, would have been signed as an extension of I-93. The portion south of I-195 would have remained MA-24 and then RI-24. This proposal too was eventually tabled due to high costs, especially those projected for reconstruction of part of the highway south of Interstate 495. Here were the early cost estimates for the Interstate upgrade project: Phase I: Randolph I-93 Interchange Reconstruction ($30 million), Phase II: Randolph to Stoughton ($56 million), Phase III: Canton to Bridgewater ($224 million), Phase IV: Bridgewater to I-495 ($175 million), Phase V: I-495 to US 44 ($35 million), and Phase VI: US 44 to Fall River ($357 million). The total cost was expected to be $877 million. There are currently no proposals in the MassDOT highway listings to upgrade MA 24 to an interstate.

== Exit list ==
All interchanges were to be renumbered to mileage-based numbers under a project scheduled to start in 2016. However, this project was indefinitely postponed by MassDOT until November 18, 2019, when MassDOT confirmed that beginning in late summer 2020 the exit renumbering project will begin. Renumbering the exits along this highway started on January 6, 2021, and it was completed on January 19.

County	Location	mi	km	Old exit	New exit	Destinations	Notes
Bristol	Fall River	0.000	0.000	–	–	Route 24 south – Tiverton, RI, Newport, RI	Continuation into Rhode Island
Bristol	Fall River	0.213	0.343	–	1	Route 81 – Adamsville, RI, Fall River	Signed as exits 1A (south) and 1B (north)
Bristol	Fall River	1.711	2.754	–	2	Brayton Avenue / Eastern Avenue	
Bristol	Fall River	1.892	3.045	8A	3 (NB); 14A (SB)	I-195 west – Providence, RI	Southern end of I-195 concurrency
Bristol	Fall River	3.228	5.195	8B	14B (NB); 4 (SB)	I-195 east – New Bedford, Cape Cod	Northern end of I-195 concurrency
Bristol	Fall River	5.434	8.745	–	5	US 6 (President Avenue / Eastern Avenue)	
Bristol	Fall River	7.726	12.434	–	6	Highland Avenue	Southbound exit and northbound entrance
Bristol	Fall River	7.943	12.783	–	7	Route 79 south – North Fall River, Somerset	Southbound exit and northbound entrance; southern end of Route 79 concurrency
Bristol	Fall River	8.331	13.407	8A	8	Airport Road / North Main Street	
Bristol	Freetown	9.600	15.450	8B	10	Innovation Way – Fall River, Freetown	Formerly Executive Park Drive; opened in 2012
Bristol	Freetown	11.265	18.129	9	11	Route 79 north (South Main Street)	Northern end of Route 79 concurrency
Bristol	Freetown	12.594	20.268	10	13	North Main Street – Assonet, Dighton	
Bristol	Berkley	15.729	25.313	11	16	Padelford Street – Berkley, Dighton	
Bristol	Taunton	17.395	27.995	12	17	Route 140 – New Bedford, Taunton	Signed as exits 17A (south) and 17B (north); exits 20A-B on Route 140
Bristol	Raynham	19.871	31.979	13	20	US 44 – Middleboro, Taunton	Signed as exits 20A (east) and 20B (west) northbound
Plymouth	Bridgewater	22.864– 22.917	36.796– 36.881	14	22	I-495 – Cape Cod, Marlboro	Signed as exits 22A (south) and 22B (north); exits 19A-B on I-495. Partially in Raynham
Plymouth	Bridgewater	23.6	38.0	Service Area			
Plymouth	Bridgewater	24.282	39.078	15	24	Route 104 – Bridgewater, Raynham	
Plymouth	West Bridgewater	27.849	44.819	16	28	Route 106 – West Bridgewater, Easton	Signed as exits 28A (east) and 28B (west) To Route 138
Plymouth	Brockton	31.249	50.290	17	31	Route 123 – Brockton, Easton	Signed as exits 31A (east) and 31B (west)
Plymouth	Brockton	33.477	53.876	18	33	Route 27 – Brockton, Stoughton	Signed as exits 33A (south) and 33B (north)
Norfolk	Avon	35.668	57.402	19	35	Harrison Boulevard / Central Street – Avon, Stoughton	Signed as exits 35A (Harrison) and 35B (Central)
Norfolk	Stoughton	37.895	60.986	20	38	Route 139 – Randolph, Stoughton	Signed as exits 38A (east) and 38B (west)
Norfolk	Randolph	40.803	65.666	21	41	I-93 / US 1 to I-95 north (Route 128 north) / Route 3 – Boston, Cape Cod	Northern terminus; signed as exits 41A (north) and 41B (south); exit 4 on I-93; former Route 128
1.000 mi = 1.609 km; 1.000 km = 0.621 mi: Concurrency terminus; Incomplete access
