= U.S. Route 6 in Massachusetts =

Segment of American highway

U.S. Route 6
- Grand Army of the Republic Highway
- US 6 highlighted in red

Route information
- Maintained by MassDOT and the town of Provincetown
- Length: 117.952 mi (189.825 km)
- Existed: 1926–present

Major junctions
- West end: US 6 at the Rhode Island state line in Seekonk
- I-195 in Swansea; Route 138 from Somerset to Fall River; Route 79 in Fall River; Route 24 in Fall River; Route 140 in New Bedford; Route 25 / Route 28 in Buzzards Bay; Route 3 in Sagamore; Route 6A / Route 28 in Orleans and Eastham
- East end: Route 6A in Provincetown

Location
- Country: United States
- State: Massachusetts
- Counties: Bristol, Plymouth, Barnstable

Highway system
- United States Numbered Highway System; List; Special; Divided; Massachusetts State Highway System; Interstate; US; State
← Route 5A	→ Route 6A
← Route 5	N.E.	→ Route 6A

U.S. Route 6 (US 6) in Massachusetts is a 117.952-mile-long (189.825 km) portion of the cross-country route connecting Providence, Rhode Island, to Fall River, New Bedford, and Cape Cod. In the Fall River and New Bedford areas, US 6 parallels Interstate 195 (I-195). On Cape Cod, US 6 is a highway interconnecting the towns of the area. The freeway section in this area is also known as the Mid-Cape Highway. The highway is also alternatively signed as the "Grand Army of the Republic Highway".

The section of the Mid-Cape Highway between exit 78 and the Orleans rotary is known to locals as "Suicide Alley" due to the number of fatal accidents that happen on this stretch of two-lane divided freeway with only a berm separating the lanes of traffic.

== Route description ==
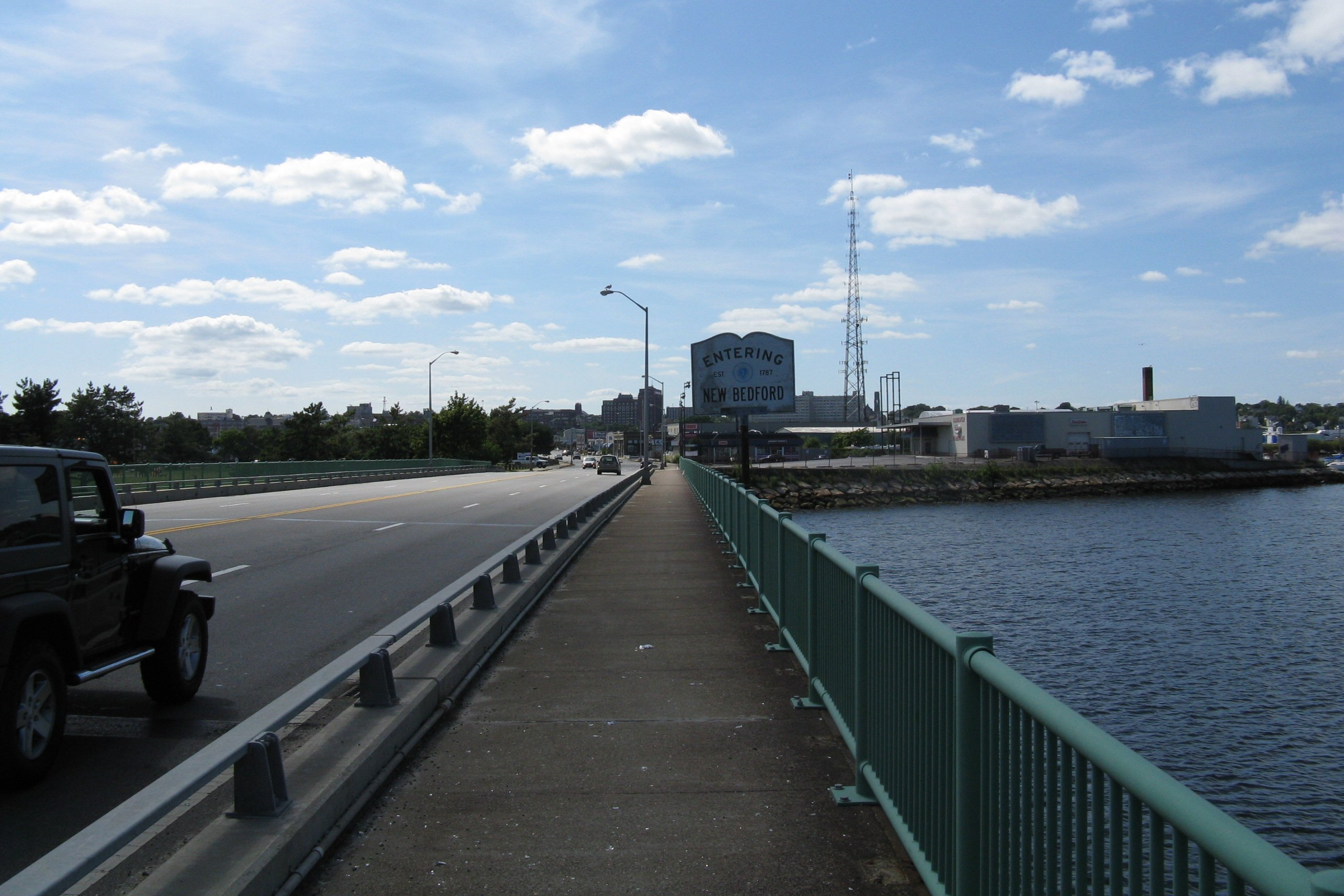
Looking westbound entering New Bedford

=== Seekonk to the Sagamore Bridge ===
US 6 is a four-lane road for approximately its first 54 miles (87 km) from the Rhode Island line (crossing into Massachusetts from East Providence, Rhode Island, to Seekonk) to the Cape Cod Canal, except for sections in New Bedford, where it runs along a one-way pair, and Fall River, where it is a two-lane avenue.

US 6 enters Massachusetts into Seekonk, just south of I-195. The first mile and a quarter (2.01 km) passes through the busy Seekonk retail area. The route passes through Rehoboth and Swansea, with access to I-195 at Route 136, which heads southward into Bristol County, Rhode Island. The road then has an interchange with I-195 at the latter's exit 3, just east of the southern terminus of Route 118. The road heads through the southern end of Somerset before crossing the Veterans Memorial Bridge over the Taunton River into the city of Fall River. On the Somerset end of the bridge, Route 103 meets its eastern terminus and Route 138 joins US 6 to cross the bridge as concurrent routes. Prior to late 2011, Route 6 and Route 138 followed a previous alignment over the Brightman Street Bridge, which has since closed.

Once Route 6/Route 138 enter Fall River, Route 138 splits off and US 6 follows two halves as Davol Street on either side of Route 79 before turning east as two-lane President Avenue, following up the Seven Hills to the Highlands neighborhood. At the end of President Avenue the road turns southward at a rotary (which also provides access to Route 24) onto four-lane Eastern Avenue. The road passes over I-195 (without an interchange) one last time before turning eastward along Martine Street onto the "Narrows", the thin strip of land between the Watuppa Ponds that also carries the interstate between Fall River and Westport. Once over the Narrows, the road turns southeast, traveling through the town. I-195 can be accessed from Route 6 in Westport via Route 88, which intersects with Route 6 shortly before meeting its northern terminus at the Interstate. At the Dartmouth line, the road serves as the eastern terminus of Route 177. After passing through the Dartmouth retail area and two roads (Reed Road and Faunce Corner Road) that provide access to I-195, the route passes into the city of New Bedford.

In New Bedford, the route splits just east of the southern terminus of Route 140 onto Kempton Street (eastbound) and Mill Street (westbound), two one-lane, one-way streets. The two halves join again to serve as the southern terminus of Route 18 just before crossing the New Bedford – Fairhaven Bridge into the town of Fairhaven. After serving as the southern terminus of Route 240 the route continues east into Mattapoisett and Marion along a four-lane road. Access to I-195 is provided in both towns along North Street in Mattapoisett and Route 105 in Marion. US 6 then crosses the Weweantic River into Wareham. In the central part of town, the route turns southeast along Main Street, then east-northeast along Sandwich Road before beginning a concurrency with Route 28, with the first 0.75 miles (1.21 km) being split one-way between east and west, just south of Route 25, the major connecting highway between Cape Cod and I-195 and I-495. The route passes through busy retail area of East Wareham before passing into Buzzards Bay. The two routes split into east and west one-way sections again before Route 28 leaves the concurrency to cross the Bourne Bridge across the Cape Cod Canal. US 6 then follows the western side of the canal along the Scenic Highway into Sagamore before joining the right-of-way for Route 3 that ends at the Sagamore Bridge, in which US 6 crosses onto Cape Cod proper.

=== Cape Cod ===
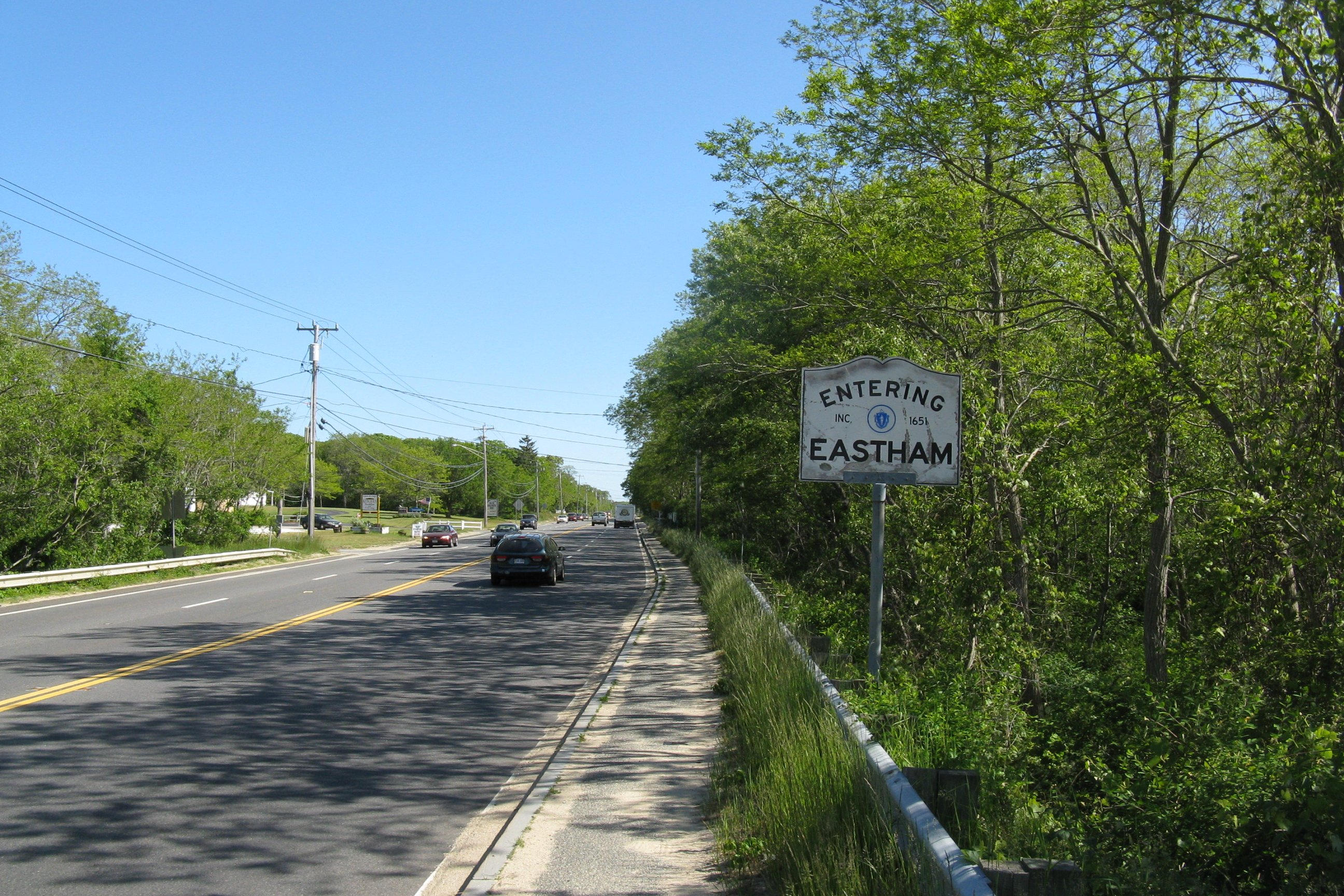
Looking southbound entering Eastham

US 6 is the primary highway serving the towns of Cape Cod, linking the communities to the Sagamore Bridge and to subsequent points north and west. Of the 15 towns on the cape, US 6 enters all but three of them; it runs completely to the north of Falmouth, Mashpee, and Chatham.

US 6 becomes a four-lane undivided freeway and crosses the canal via the Sagamore Bridge. After crossing the bridge, the road becomes a four-lane divided freeway known as the Mid-Cape Highway. The bridges from the Cape Cod Canal to Oak Street in Barnstable (a half-mile [0.80 km] west of exit 68), are unusual in their construction since they are made out of concrete and granite. At exit 78, the Mid-Cape Highway becomes a two-lane divided freeway with plastic stanchions posted on a small asphalt median. The two-lane freeway section has a secondary, less-formal name of "Suicide Alley", due to the high number of fatalities from head-on collisions before the median improvements were constructed from 1989 to 1992. The Mid-Cape Highway carries a speed limit of 55 mph (89 km/h) on the four-lane section and 50 mph (80 km/h) on the two-lane section. It remains like this until Orleans, where the freeway ends at a large rotary.

Through Eastham and North Truro, US 6 is a four-lane surface road once again. Through Wellfleet and southern Truro, US 6 is a former three-lane road converted to two lanes with broad shoulders. In Provincetown, the road is locally maintained, and ends as a divided highway before meeting Route 6A at the Cape Cod National Seashore. For the last several miles in Provincetown, eastbound US 6 is actually heading west-southwest.

== History ==
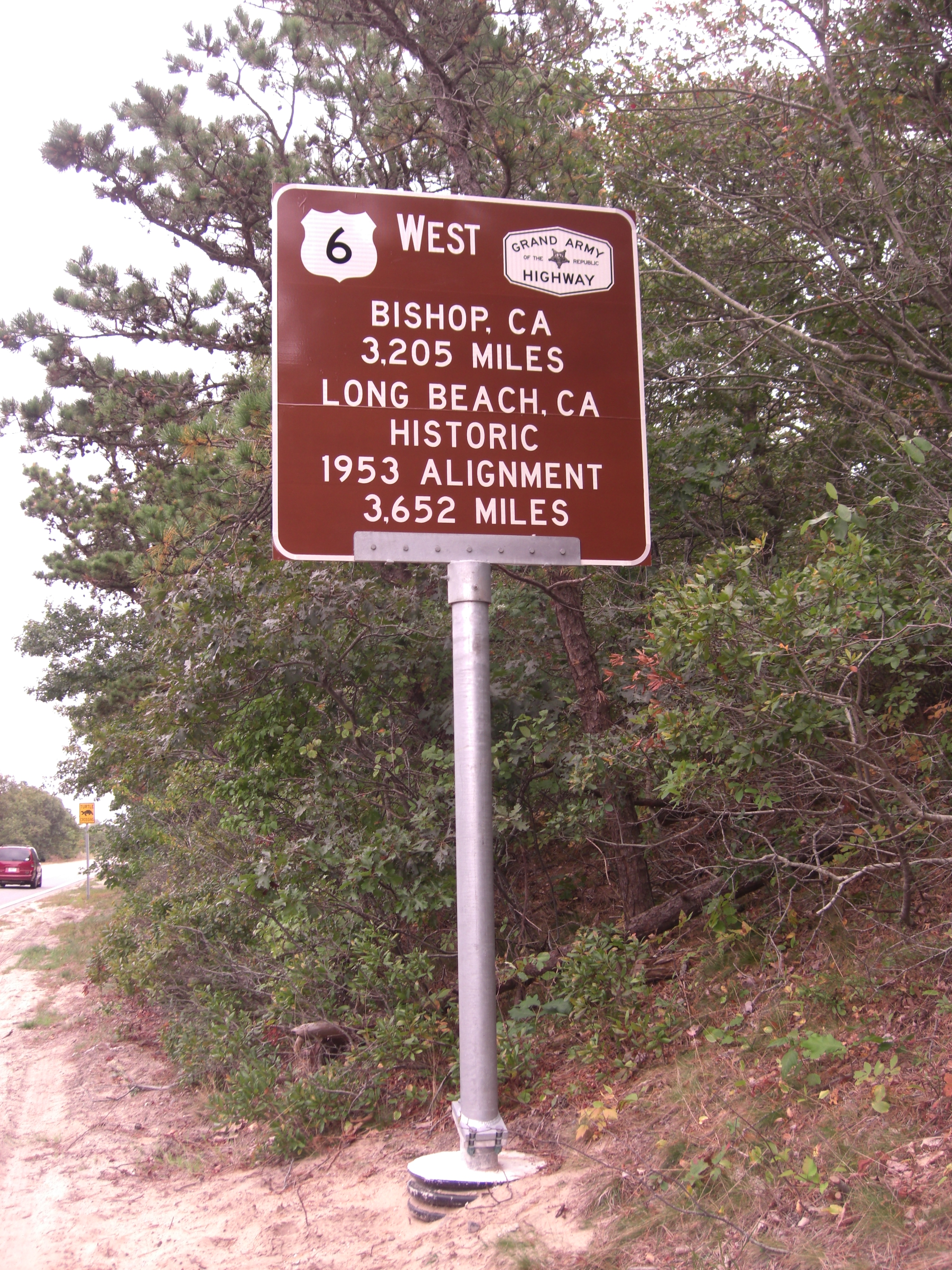
US 6's westbound facing terminus in Provincetown. This sign was erected in mid-2010

=== New England Route 3 ===

Before the U.S. Numbered Highway System, the route from Rhode Island to Bourne, and from Orleans to Provincetown, was part of New England Route 3 (Route 3). Within the Upper Cape, however, Route 3 went along what is now Route 28 between Bourne and Orleans. The US 6 designation was instead applied to the route on the north shore of Cape Cod, which was known as Route 6 before 1926 (now Route 6A).

=== Former alignments in Somerset, Fall River, and Westport ===
Prior to the building of I-195, the Fall River portion of US 6 followed a different alignment. After entering the city via the Brightman Street Bridge, the route followed Davol Street to Turner Street, where it split to Durfee Street, a short portion of South Main Street and Pleasant Street (eastbound) and North Main Street to Bedford Street to Eastern Avenue (westbound, in reverse order). Both routes then took Pleasant Street east of Eastern Avenue to McGowan Street, which crossed into Westport and joined the current alignment of US 6. The current alignment of these streets would be impossible now, as Turner Street's connection to Durfee Street is blocked, and both Pleasant Street and McGowan Street end just before the ramps between I-195 and Route 24. Their former pathway into Westport is also gone, replaced by the path of the Interstate. The only remnants of the old path is the odd turn Old Bedford Road takes before intersecting, having once been a separate street; the original alignment would have extended straight to US 6.

The Brightman Street Bridge drawbridge carried US 6 and Route 138 between Somerset (at the eastern terminus of Route 103) and Fall River before 2011. In 2011, the Veterans Memorial Bridge opened, relocating US 6/Route 138 to a brief higher-speed freeway-like roadway over a taller drawbridge between Somerset and Fall River. The connection between US 6 west of the construction site and its now-closed alignment to the closed and unused Brightman Street Bridge was closed at this time, with the former alignment being renamed from Grand Army of the Republic Highway (GAR Highway), which is another name for US 6 nationwide, to Slade's Ferry Boulevard. Traveling eastbound through Somerset, the new alignment bends northeast at the old alignment to a signalized intersection at Brayton Avenue. After this, a partial interchange (westbound exit and eastbound entrance) provides partial access between US 6, Route 138, and Route 103 (Route 103 was extended a short distance along the former Route 138 alignment to end at the new partial interchange. US 6 eastbound has no direct access to Route 138 northbound and Route 103 westbound; traffic uses Brayton Avenue and the former US 6 alignment (Slade's Ferry Bridge) to access Route 103 (just south of the interchange) and Route 138. At the partial interchange in Somerset, since 2011, Route 138 joins US 6 so both can travel over the Taunton River into the city of Fall River and an interchange with Route 79.

The interchanges and intersections at the eastern end of each bridge have been reconstructed multiple times; when Route 79 construction is finished, both the brief US 6/Route 138 bridge expressway and Route 79 expressway will end here, with US 6/Route 79/Route 138 traveling along the Davol Street one-way pair to the south (US 6 will continue to exit Davol Street at President Avenue, as it has since the construction of the now-closed central section of the Western Fall River Expressway (MA 79) and the Davol Street one-way pair in the early-to-mid-1970s.

=== US 6 bypass ===
When US 6 was first routed through Provincetown in 1926, the highway was signed along the rather narrow Commercial Street. After the Provincetown US 6 bypass was built, congestion and the increasing size of automobiles forced the town to post most of Commercial Street (all but the easternmost mile that hits the Truro line) as one-way westbound. Route 6A, when signed, was placed along the paralleling Bradford Street instead. There was an alternate plan at the time to make Bradford one-way westbound and Commercial one-way eastbound (which would have made both roads Route 6A), but this was rejected, as the town decided instead to let incoming traffic through the heavy Commercial Street (almost entirely pedestrian) business district.

US 6 was briefly signed on current I-195 between Route 105 and Route 28; however, when I-195 was completed, and the I-195 designation took over that section of freeway, US 6 reverted to its older route.

Formerly, US 6 took both sides along the Cape Cod Canal (and was signed as US 6 Bypass, or US 6 Byp.), but is now routed only on the north side (The south side is now signed "TO 6" from the Sagamore Bridge to the Bourne Bridge). However, a single US 6 Byp. sign still exists along Sandwich Road just north of the Bourne Bridge rotary.

=== Milepost-based exit numbering ===
The Massachusetts Department of Transportation (MassDOT) planned to change the exit numbers along the Mid-Cape Highway in 2016, as part of sign replacement contract to be run concurrently with a statewide project to convert freeway exit numbers from a sequential to a distance-based system. The new exit numbers would have ranged from 55 in Sandwich to 88 in Orleans. The first interchange on the Mid-Cape with Route 3 that is now signed as exits 1A to 1B would have been resigned as exits 55A to 55B, and so forth. However, in February 2016, when local Cape Cod officials found out about the plan, including the new numbers and that the signs would be larger than the current ones to be placed on overhead gantries, they complained to MassDOT and their local legislators. In response, MassDOT announced at a June 2016 public meeting that it listened to the public comments and were redesigning the signs to match the size of the current ones and that the exit numbers would not be changed, for now. The exit tabs and gore signs for the new signage would be designed however so the milepost numbers could fit on them, if changed, sometime in the future. The winning bid for the scaled down contract simply to replace the signs was made by Liddell Bros. Inc. of Halifax and announced on February 7, 2017. The project started in mid-2017 and was completed in late 2019. Meanwhile, on November 18, 2019, MassDOT announced that a statewide exit renumbering project would begin in the last part of 2020. While Cape officials again objected to the proposed numbers (based on the same mileage as those in 2016 from the Rhode Island border), state officials this time held their ground. The statewide project started on October 18, 2020, with Route 140. Work to renumber US 6 started on December 13, 2020, and was completed on December 24, 2020.

=== 21st century changes ===
MassDOT plans to convert one of the dual carriageways on the little-used eastern end of US 6 in Provincetown to a car-free bike path, scheduled for construction from 2024 to 2026. A potential future extension would connect this to the Cape Cod Rail Trail in Wellfleet.

== Major intersections ==
County	Location	mi	km	Old exit	New exit	Destinations	Notes
Bristol	Seekonk	0.00	0.00			US 6 west – East Providence	Continuation into Rhode Island
Bristol	Seekonk	0.862– 0.894	1.387– 1.439			Route 114A to I-195 / Route 114 – Rumford, RI, Pawtucket, RI, Barrington, RI, Warren, RI	
Bristol	Swansea	4.687	7.543			Route 136 – Warren, RI, Newport, RI, Rehoboth	
Bristol	Swansea	7.359– 7.620	11.843– 12.263			I-195 – Fall River, Cape Cod, Providence, RI	Exit 8 on I-195
Bristol	Swansea	7.748	12.469			Route 118 north – Rehoboth, Attleboro	Southern terminus of Route 118
Bristol	Somerset	11.380	18.314			Route 103 west / Route 138 north – Warren, RI, Somerset	Westbound exit and eastbound entrance; western end of Route 138 concurrency; east end of Route 103; western end of brief freeway section over the bridge and bridge approaches
Bristol	Taunton River	11.380– 11.564	18.314– 18.610	Veterans Memorial Bridge			
Bristol	Fall River	11.564– 11.885	18.610– 19.127			Route 79 / Route 138 south – Taunton, Middleboro, Tiverton, RI	Interchange; eastern terminus of Route 138 concurrency; eastern end of brief freeway section over the bridge and bridge approaches
Bristol	Fall River	13.481	21.696			Route 24 to I-195 – Boston, Newport, RI	President Avenue Rotary; exit 5 on Route 24
Bristol	Westport	17.834– 18.003	28.701– 28.973			Route 88 to I-195 – Horseneck Beach, New Bedford, Providence, RI	Interchange
Bristol	Dartmouth	21.119	33.988			Route 177 west – Westport, Tiverton, RI	Eastern terminus of Route 177
Bristol	Dartmouth	21.595	34.754			Reed Road to I-195	
Bristol	Dartmouth	24.205	38.954			Faunce Corner Mall Road to I-195 – Fall River, Cape Cod	
Bristol	New Bedford	25.737	41.420			Route 140 north to I-195 – Taunton, Boston	Southern terminus of Route 140
Bristol	New Bedford	27.534– 27.595	44.312– 44.410			Route 18 north to I-195 – Acushnet	Westbound exit and eastbound entrance; southern terminus of Route 18
Bristol	Acushnet River	27.833– 27.925	44.793– 44.941	Fish Island Bridge			
Bristol	Acushnet River	28.207– 28.337	45.395– 45.604	Fairhaven Bridge			
Bristol	Fairhaven	29.878	48.084			Route 240 north to I-195 – Fall River, Cape Cod	Southern terminus of Route 240
Plymouth	Marion	39.160	63.022			Route 105 north to I-195 – Rochester, Middleboro	Southern terminus of Route 105
Plymouth	East Wareham	45.76	73.64			Route 28 north (Cranberry Highway) / Maple Springs Road to I-495 west / Route 25 west / I-195 – Boston, Providence	Western end of Route 28 concurrency
Plymouth	East Wareham	46.108	74.204			Glen Charlie Road to Route 25 – Cape Cod, Boston	
Barnstable	Buzzards Bay	50.336	81.008			Route 25 west / Route 28 south to I-195 west / I-495 north – Boston, Falmouth, The Islands	Buzzards Bay Rotary; eastern terminus and exit 10 on Route 25; eastern end of Route 28 concurrency
Barnstable	Sagamore	53.673	86.378	Western end of freeway section			
Barnstable	Sagamore	53.673	86.378		1	Route 3 north to Route 3A / Meetinghouse Lane – Plymouth, Boston	Signed as exits 1B (Route 3) and 1A (Meetinghouse); Meetinghouse Ln. signed as Scusset Beach Rd.; western end of Route 3 concurrency
Barnstable	Sagamore	53.973	86.861	Route 3 ends			
Barnstable	Cape Cod Canal	54.753	88.116	Sagamore Bridge			
Barnstable	Bourne	55.561	89.417	1C	55	To Route 6A – Sagamore	Westbound exit and entrance; access via Cranberry Highway
Barnstable	Bourne	55.561	89.417	1C	55	Route 6A east – Sagamore	Eastbound exit and entrance; access via Mid-Cape Connector
Barnstable	Sandwich	58.817	94.657	2	59	Route 130 – Sandwich, Mashpee	
Barnstable	Sandwich	60.762	97.787	3	61	Quaker Meeting House Road – East Sandwich	
Barnstable	Sandwich	62.943	101.297	4	63	Chase Road – East Sandwich, South Sandwich	
Barnstable	Barnstable	65.294	105.081	5	65	Route 149 – Marstons Mills, West Barnstable	
Barnstable	Barnstable	68.101– 68.485	109.598– 110.216	6	68	Route 132 – Barnstable, Hyannis	Serves Cape Cod Community College
Barnstable	Yarmouth	72.225	116.235	7	72	Willow Street – Yarmouth Port, West Yarmouth	
Barnstable	Yarmouth	74.485	119.872	8	75	Union Street – Yarmouth, Dennis	
Barnstable	Dennis	77.690	125.030	9	78	Route 134 – Dennis Port, West Harwich, Dennis	Signed as exits 78A (south) and 78B (north)
Barnstable	Harwich	81.792	131.631	10	82	Route 124 – Harwich, Brewster	
Barnstable	Harwich	84.302	135.671	11	85	Route 137 – Brewster, Chatham	
Barnstable	Orleans	88.831	142.960	12	89	Route 6A – Orleans, East Brewster	
Barnstable	Orleans	90.880	146.257	Eastern end of freeway section			
Barnstable	Orleans	90.880	146.257			Route 6A west / Route 28 north / Rock Harbor Road – Orleans	Orleans Rotary; western end of unsigned Route 6A concurrency
Barnstable	Truro	106.364– 106.637	171.176– 171.616			Pamet Roads – Truro Center	Interchange
Barnstable	Truro	109.451	176.144			Route 6A north (Shore Road) – North Truro, Beach Point	Eastern end of unsigned Route 6A concurrency
Barnstable	Truro	109.899– 110.282	176.865– 177.482			Highland Road – North Truro, Highland Light	Interchange
Barnstable	Provincetown	114.8	184.8			Snail Road – Provincetown, Dune Shacks Trail	Restricted access to Dune Shacks Trail
Barnstable	Provincetown	116.3	187.2			Race Point Road, Race Point Light – Provincetown; Conwell Street - Provincetown Center	
Barnstable	Provincetown	117.952	189.825			Route 6A west – Provincetown	Eastern terminus
1.000 mi = 1.609 km; 1.000 km = 0.621 mi: Concurrency terminus; Incomplete access

== Related routes ==
- Route 6A, a more northern alignment of US 6 in Cape Cod prior to the construction of the Mid-Cape Highway
- Route 28, the original alignment of Route 3 in Cape Cod
- Route 3, the designation of US 6 (excluding the stretch from Bourne to Orleans) prior to 1926
- Route 6, the designation of US 6 between Bourne and Orleans, as well as of US 3/Route 3 prior to 1926

== See also ==
- New England road marking system
- List of U.S. Highways in Massachusetts

U.S. Route 6
Previous state: Rhode Island	Massachusetts	Next state: Terminus
