= Fall River, Warren and Providence Railroad =

Defunct railroad branch in Massachusetts and Rhode Island

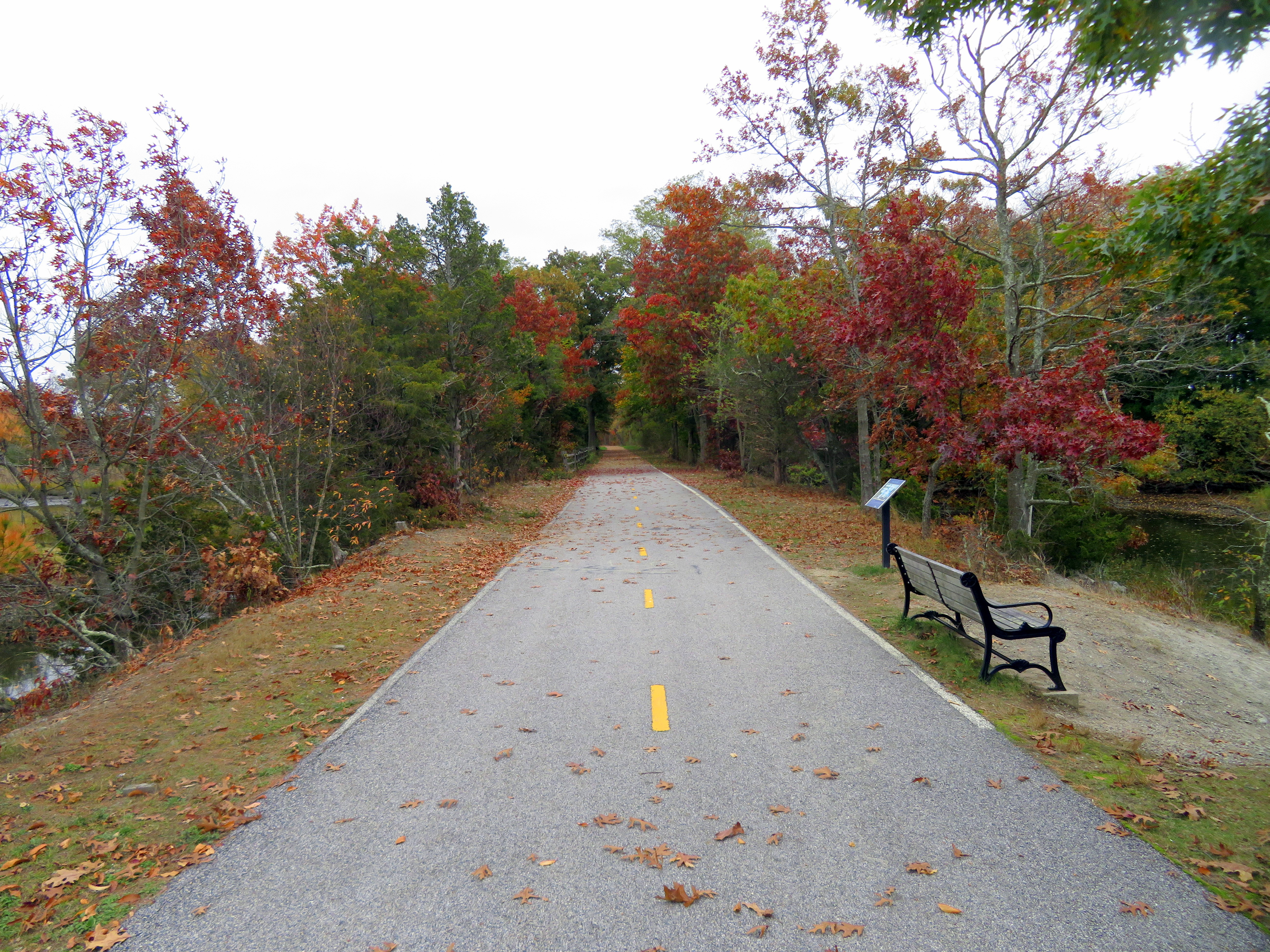
- The Warren Bike Path runs on the former Fall River Branch of the Providence, Warren and Bristol Railroad right-of-way

Overview
- Other name: Fall River Branch
- Status: Abandoned
- Locale: Bristol County, Massachusetts; Bristol County, Rhode Island
- Termini: Warren Junction; Fall River Depot
- Former connections: Providence, Warren and Bristol Railroad, Fall River Railroad
- Stations: 8

Service
- Type: Interurban (1900-1934)
- Operator(s): Fall River, Warren and Providence Railroad Company (1865-1873), Boston and Providence Railroad (1873-1875), Old Colony Railroad (1875-1893), New York, New Haven and Hartford Railroad (1893-1968), Penn Central (1969-1976)

History
- Opened: 1865
- Closed: 1932 (Brayton-Fall River), 1937 (East Warren-Brayton), 1976 (Warren-East Warren)

Technical
- Track length: 12.9 km (8.0 mi)
- Track gauge: 4 ft 8 1/2 in (1,435 mm) standard gauge
- Electrification: Overhead line, 600 V DC (electrified 1900-1934)
System map, circa 1918

The Fall River, Warren and Providence Railroad (also known as the Fall River Branch) was a branch of the Providence, Warren and Bristol Railroad that ran through the states of Rhode Island and Southeastern Massachusetts. The 8-mile (12.9 km) railroad branch formerly connected the city of Fall River, Massachusetts and Providence, Rhode Island via Warren, Rhode Island.

The line opened in 1865 and operated electrified regional rail services between 1900 and 1934, making it one of the only electrified heavy-rail lines in Massachusetts outside of the rapid-transit systems of Boston at the time. Most of the line was abandoned in 1937; all rail service ceased on the branch in 1976.

A portion of the former Fall River Branch is now the Warren Bike Path, which is a branch of the East Bay Bike Path.

== History ==
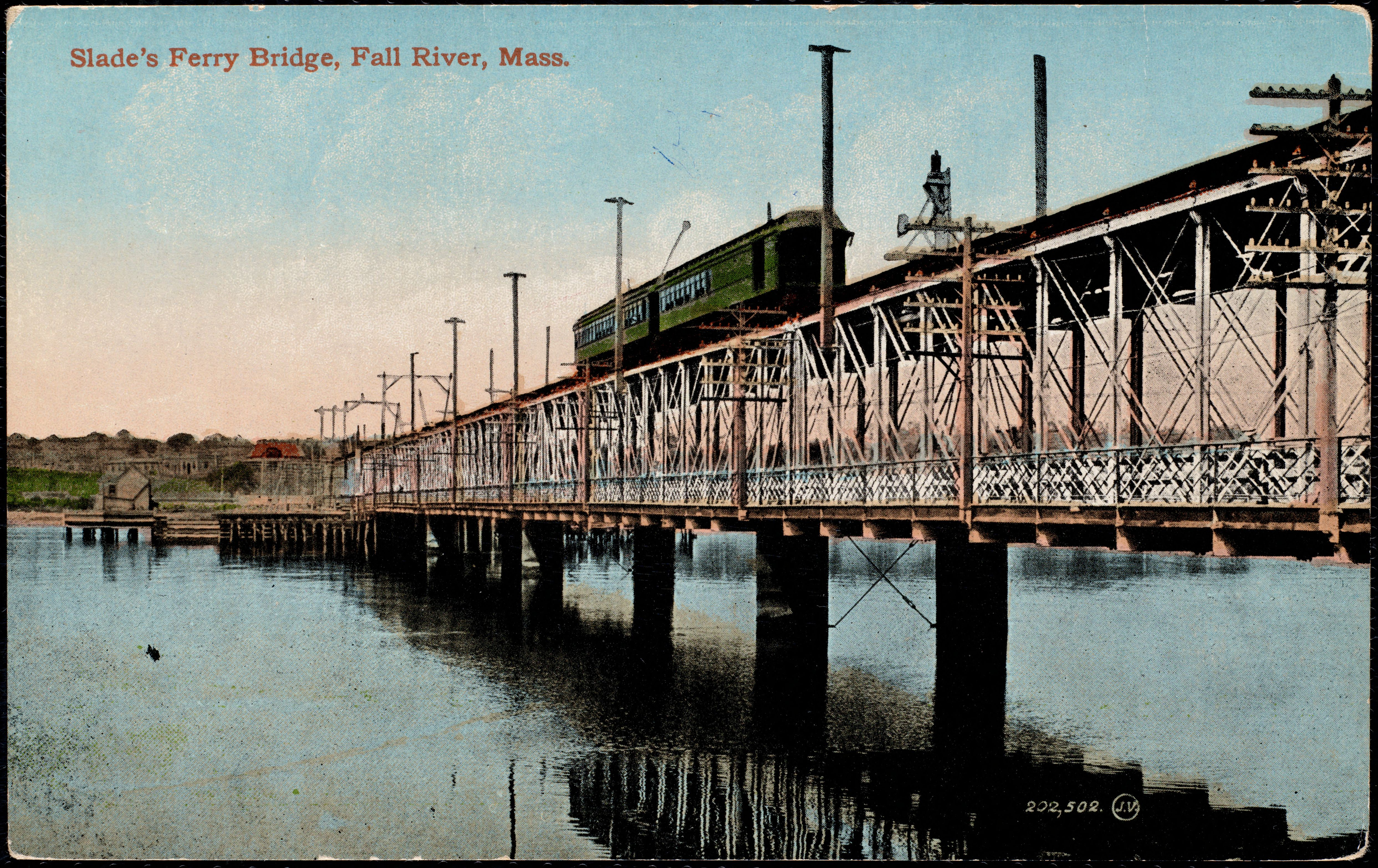
View of the former Slade's Ferry Bridge; the lower deck was designated for automobile traffic

The Fall River, Warren and Providence was incorporated in 1862 as a merger of the Warren and Fall River Railroad Company of Rhode Island and the Fall River and Warren Railroad Company of Massachusetts for the purposes of establishing a branch of the PW&B mainline to Fall River; the branch was intended to establish a new direct route from Providence to Fall River and eventually Newport, Rhode Island, via the towns of Warren, Swansea, and Somerset. A new junction for the branch was established at the Warren station site. The railroad line itself was not completed until 1865; however, the line initially terminated at Brayton Point on the bank of the Taunton River in Somerset, requiring a ferry transfer to Fall River.

The PW&B briefly operated the line before the FRW&P handled operations independently until the Boston and Providence Railroad bought the line in 1873. The line was acquired by the Old Colony Railroad in 1875 and subsequently opened the Slade's Ferry Bridge which created a rail connection over the Taunton River directly to the Fall River mainline which eliminated the ferry transfer. The Old Colony Railroad operated the line from 1875 until 1891 when it bought it outright and operated both the PW&B and the FRW&P as a single unit. In 1893 the line became part of the New York, New Haven and Hartford Railroad upon its lease of the entire Old Colony system.

=== Electrification ===
Like the PW&B mainline, the Fall River Branch was completely electrified in 1900 with a 600 Volt DC single-wire trolley system under New Haven ownership. The New Haven had originally envisioned the eventual electrification of most commuter rail lines in the South Coast of Massachusetts; however, these plans were indefinitely postponed due to cost. A power station was built in Warren; additionally a battery station was constructed on Brayton Point adjacent to the Slade's Ferry Bridge in Somerset. During rush hour periods, the battery station would pick up some of the power load, easing the burden on the Warren powerhouse. Electrification was never extended beyond Bowenville (Fall River) Station.

=== Decline and abandonment ===
The Fall River Branch was beginning to see a steady decline in ridership by the early 1930s with the onset of the Great Depression. In January 1932, the Slade's Ferry Bridge was disabled when a passing ship attempted to navigate past the swing section and collided with it. The New Haven opted to not rebuild the bridge and instead abandoned the line between Brayton Point and Fall River; Fall River Branch passenger service was subsequently replaced by buses. The Slade's Ferry Bridge was renovated soon after and the unneeded railroad span removed; the state of Massachusetts in turn acquired the bridge for use as a highway bridge and replaced the original swing section with a drawbridge.

Freight service continued between Warren and Brayton Point until the New Haven received ICC permission to abandon the line from East Warren to Brayton on June 11, 1937; however, the first half-mile (0.8 km) from Warren to East Warren was retained as a stub and became the new terminus of the PW&B mainline. The Slade's Ferry Bridge was demolished around 1965 following the completion of the much higher Braga bridge (I-195). In 1969, Penn Central assumed control of the branch and continued to operate freight to East Warren until Conrail abandoned the Bristol Secondary from Pomham to Warren in 1976, along with the East Warren stub, due to low freight demand.

== Route ==
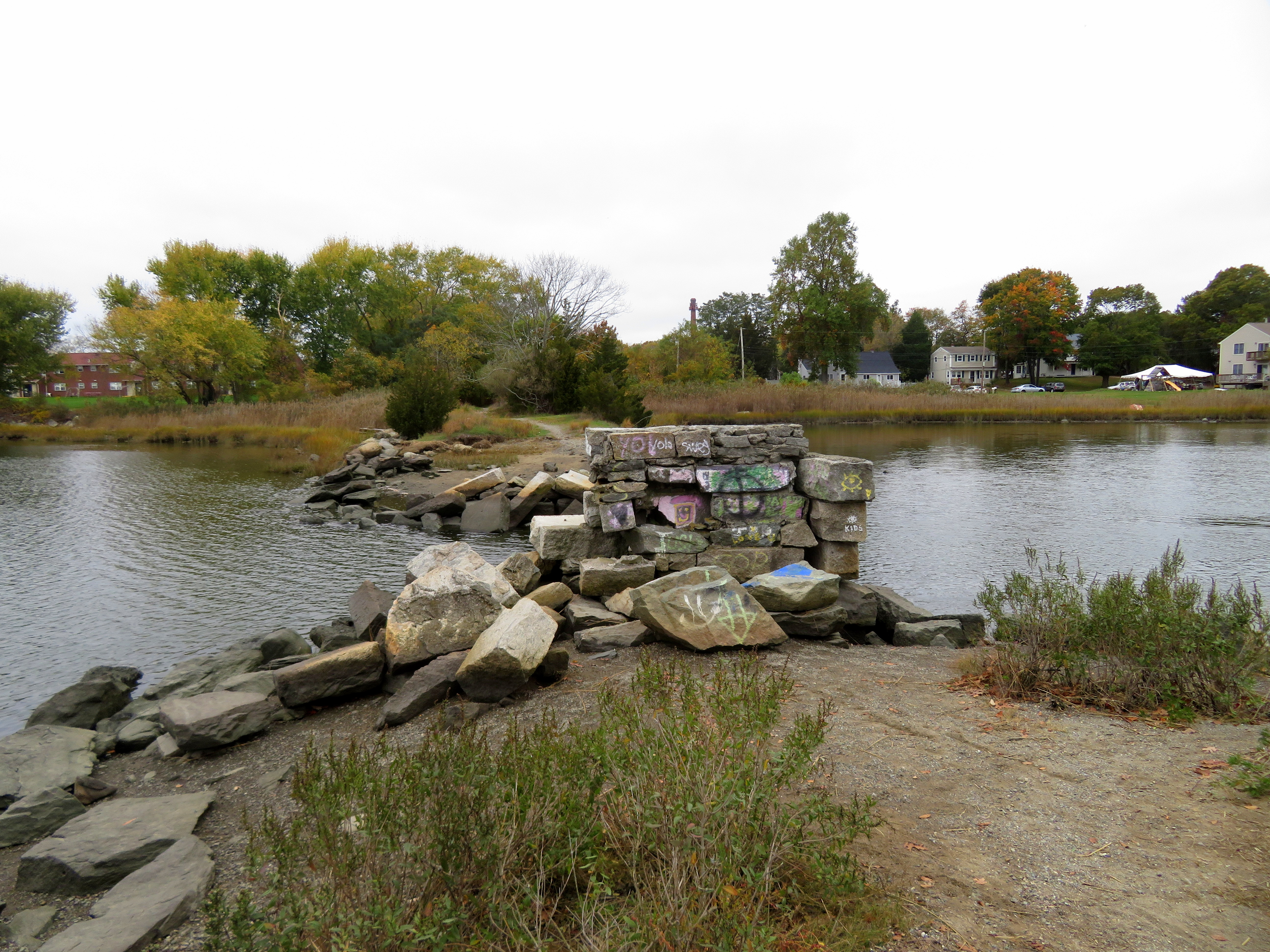
Remains of Kickemuit River railroad bridge

The branch split from the Providence, Warren and Bristol Railroad at Warren Station eastward through Swansea and Somerset, crossing over the Kickemuit, Cole, Lee and Taunton rivers; the Slade's Ferry Bridge carried both the railroad and road traffic. Despite its proximity to the Fall River Branch route, the Dighton and Somerset Railroad had its own drawbridge across the Taunton River 4 miles (6.4 km) upriver at Mallard's Point. The Fall River Branch met the Fall River mainline at Fall River Station where transfers could be made to other Old Colony lines.

Unlike the Bristol Secondary, little remains of the former Fall River Branch. Since the line had not been rail-banked, redevelopment and foliage has overtaken most of the former right-of-way. A 1-mile (1.6 km) segment reopened as the Warren Bike Path in 2010. An expansion of the bike path in Warren began in 2021, including the rebuilding of the former bridge over the Kickemuit River, left destroyed after the 1938 Hurricane. The project is scheduled for completion in 2023. Some station structures, such as the former Touisset station in Swansea, are now private homes. The former Brayton Point battery station remains abandoned a few hundred feet west from the Somerset abutment of the former Slade's Ferry Bridge, though most of the structure is obscured by foliage. Several bridge abutments are still extant in Swansea and Somerset.

== Former stations ==
Location	Station	Miles (km)	Image	Notes
Warren	Warren	0.0 (0.0)		Junction with Providence-Bristol line
Warren	East Warren	0.5 (0.8)		
Swansea	Touisset	3 (4.8)		Station structure still extant
Swansea	Ocean Grove	3.5 (5.6)		
Swansea	South Swansea	4 (6.4)		
Somerset	Somerset	5 (8.0)		
Somerset	Brayton Point	7 (12.1)		Formally located at or adjacent to the Brayton Point battery station
Fall River	Bowenville (Fall River)	8 (12.9)		Crosses Taunton River at Slades Ferry Bridge and joins Fall River main line; new station being built for South Coast Rail on the old station site

== Gallery ==
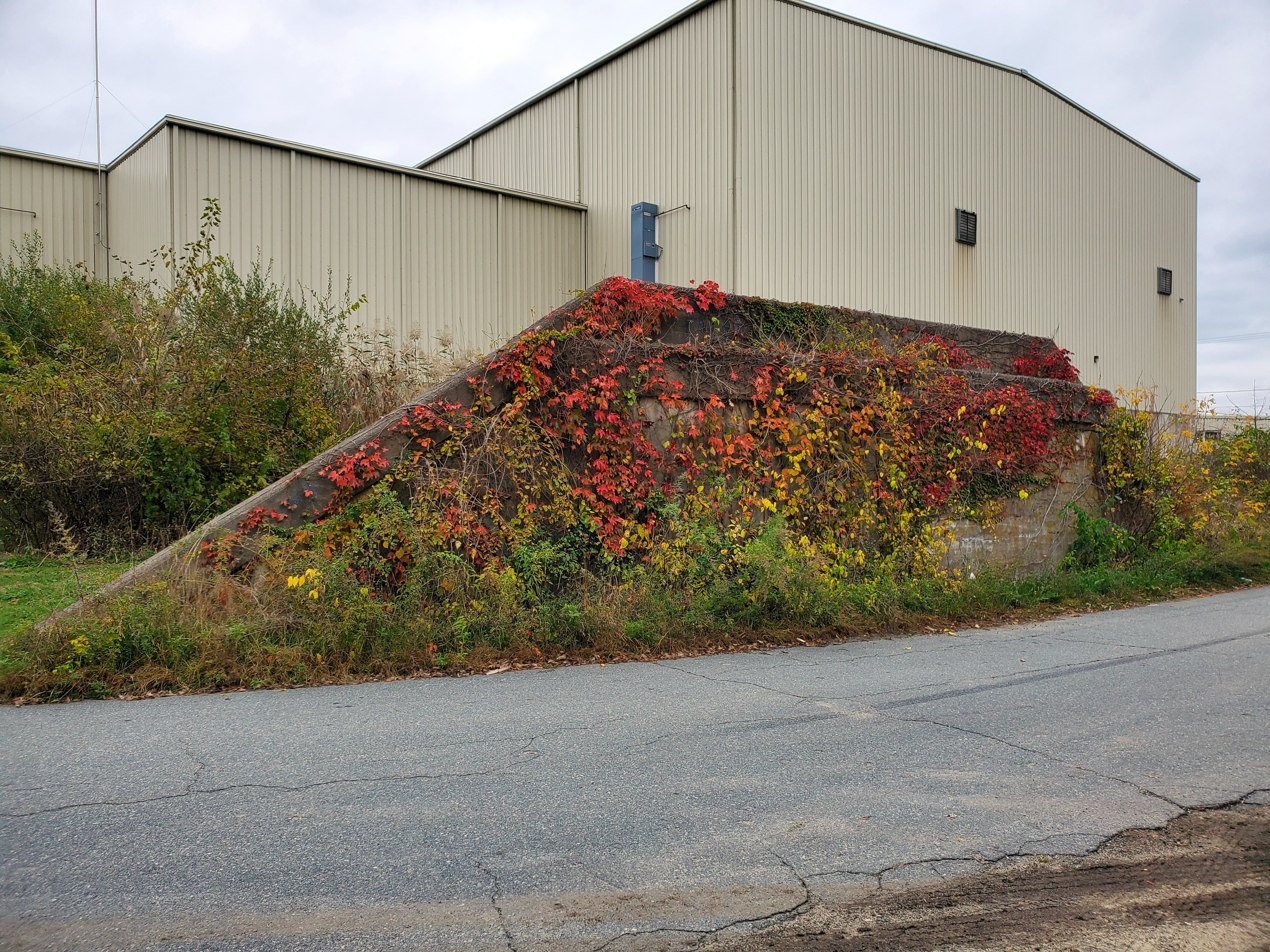
FRW&P abutment in Somerset

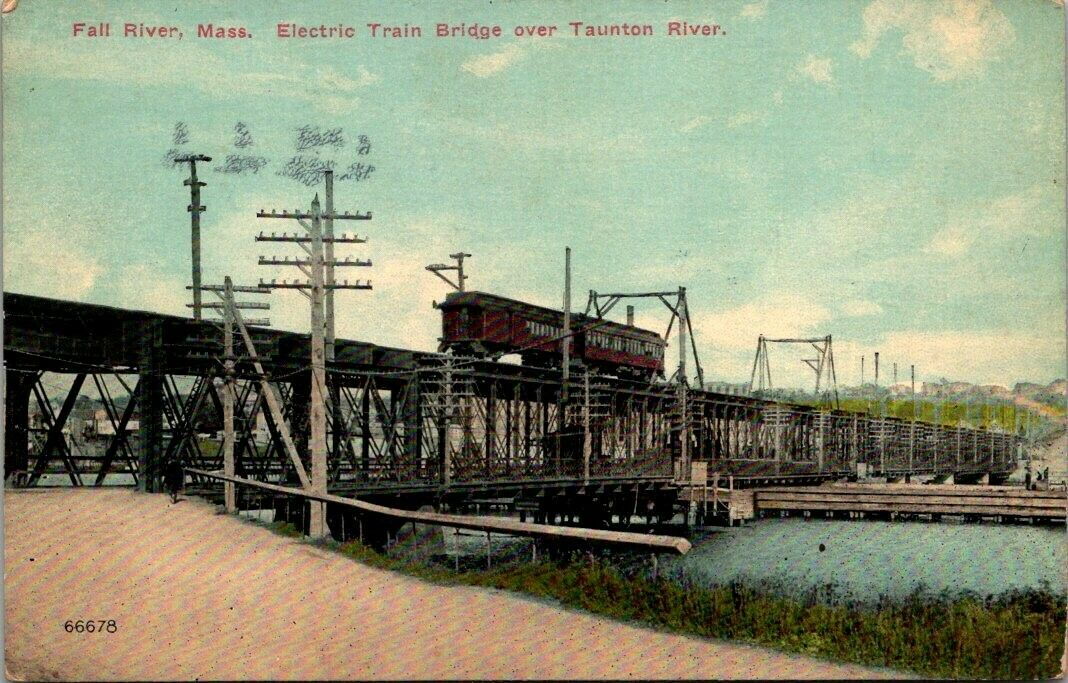
View of Slade's Ferry Bridge from Fall River

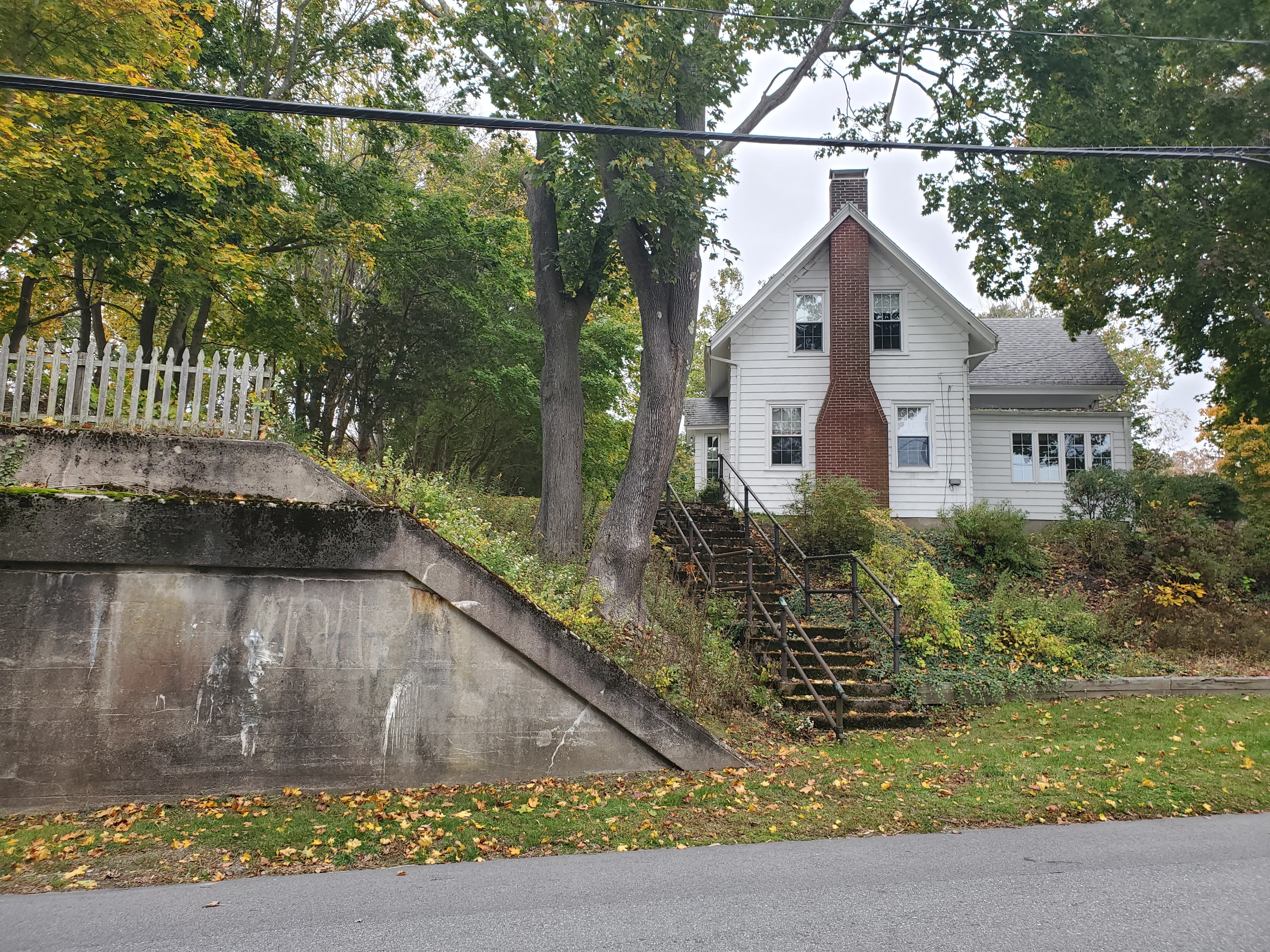
Former Touisset station and bridge abutment in Swansea

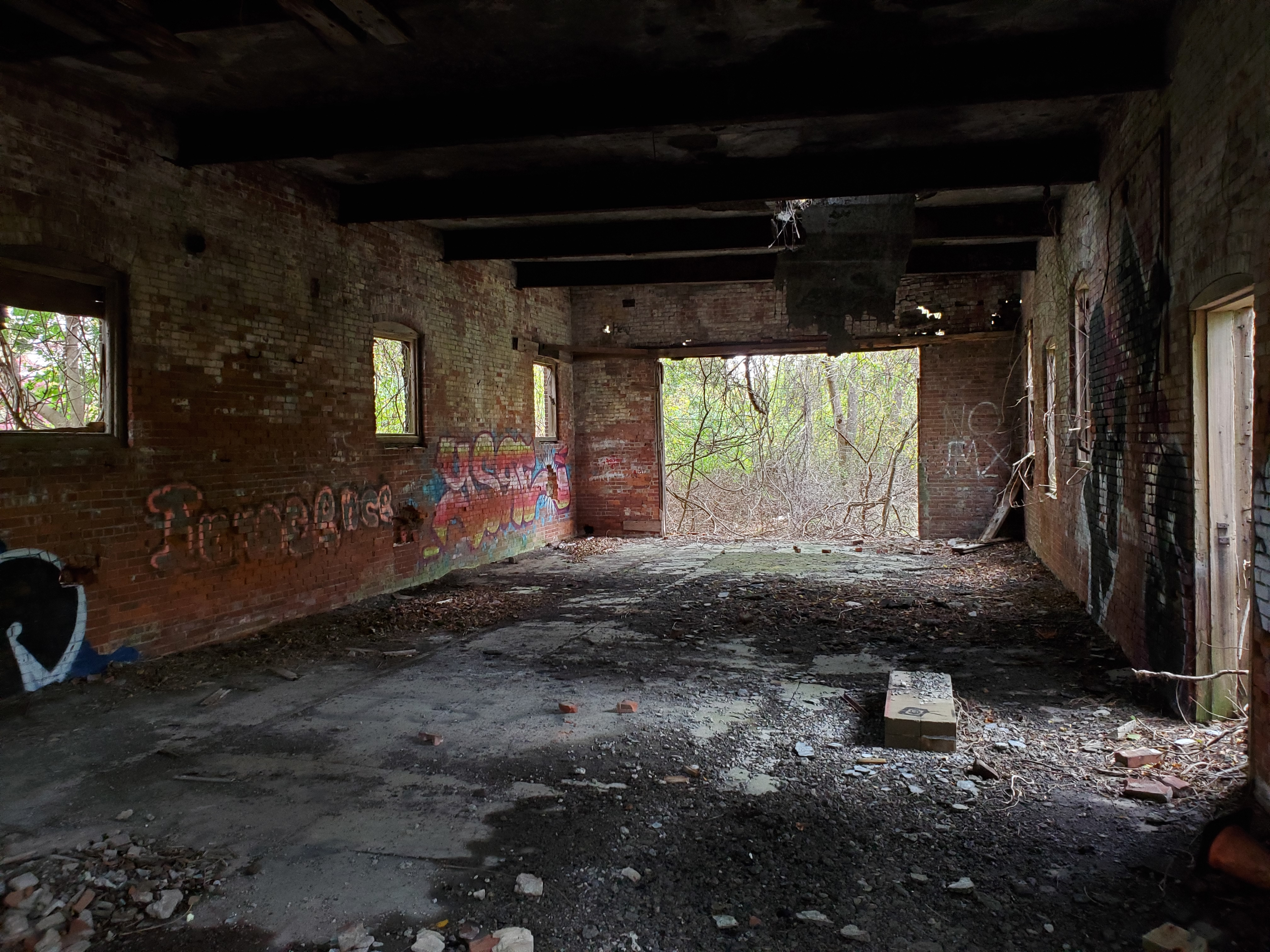
Interior of the former Brayton Point battery house

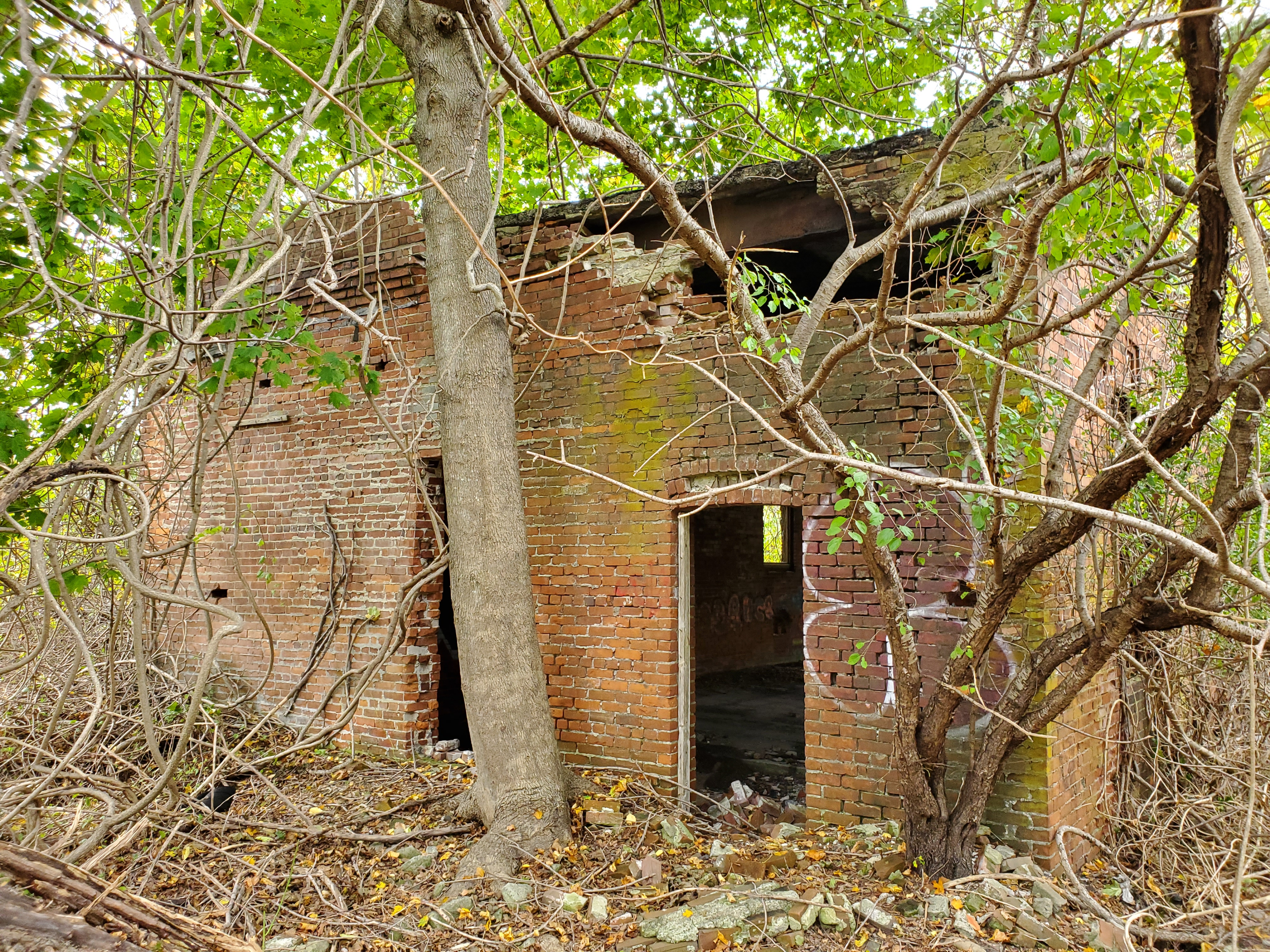
Exterior of Brayton Point battery house; the entire structure is hidden by overgrowth
