= Brightman Street Bridge (disambiguation) =

Brightman Street Bridge may refer to:

- Veterans Memorial Bridge (Bristol County, Massachusetts) - the replacement bridge over the Taunton River connecting Somerset, Massachusetts and Fall River, Massachusetts and formerly known as the "Brightman Street Bridge Replacement" or "New Brightman Street Bridge".
- Brightman Street Bridge - the original bridge.
