= Charles M. Braga Jr. Memorial Bridge =

Braga Bridge
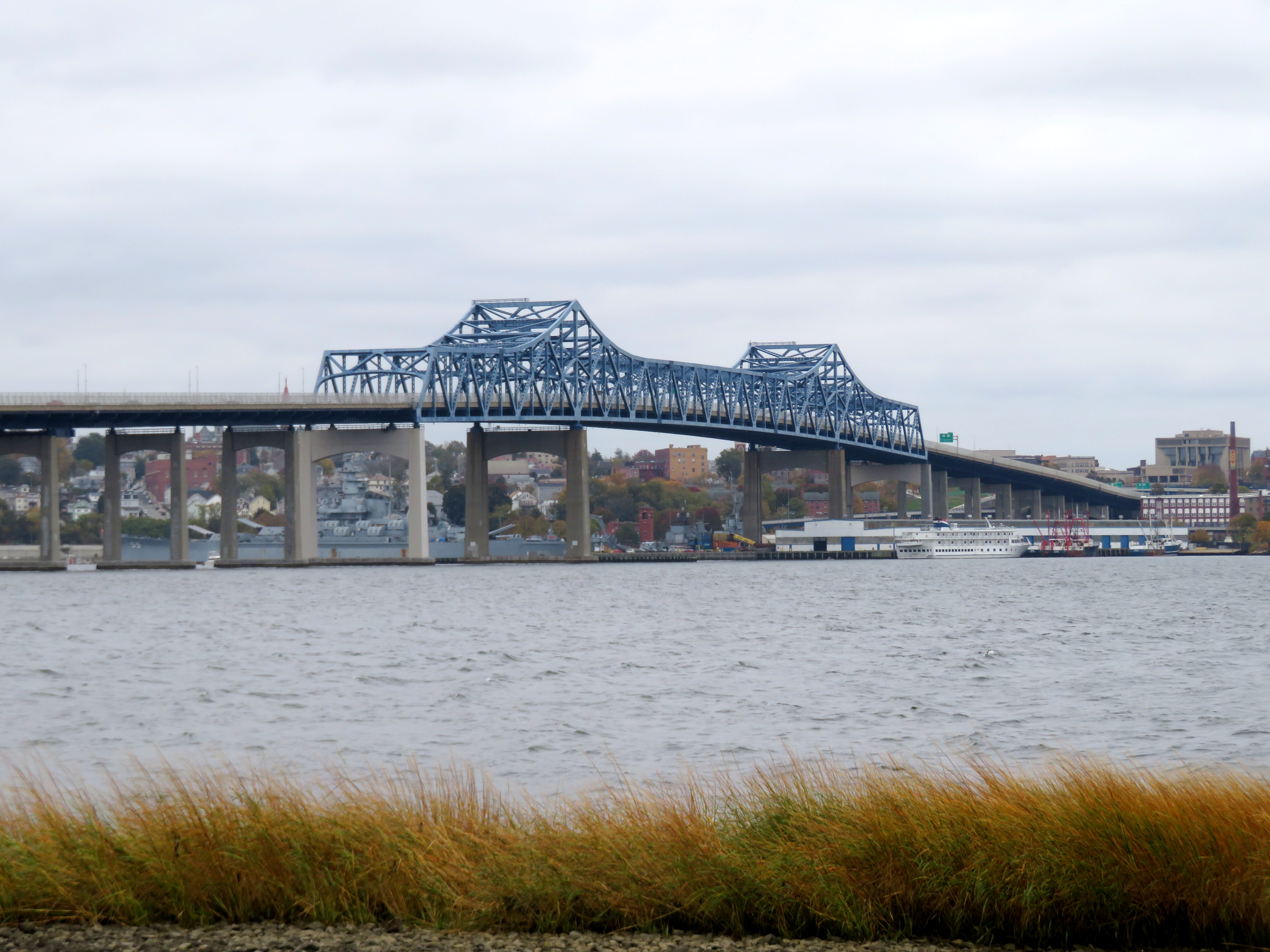
- Braga Bridge from Somerset, MA, with its 2011 blue paint job
- Coordinates: 41°42′23.62″N 71°09′56.51″W
- Carries: I-195
- Crosses: Taunton River
- Locale: Somerset and Fall River, Massachusetts
- Official name: Charles M. Braga Jr. Bridge

Characteristics
- Design: Continuous through truss, single intersection Warren truss with verticals. Approach spans are plate girders.
- Total length: 5,780 feet (1,760 m)
- Width: 101.3 feet (30.9 m)
- Height: 254 feet (77 m) (Height of towers)
- Longest span: 840 ft (256 m)
- Clearance below: 135 feet (41 m)

History
- Construction cost: $22 million
- Opened: 1966, 1989

Statistics
- Daily traffic: 80,000 - 100,000 vehicles per day

Location
- Interactive map of Braga Bridge

The Charles M. Braga Jr. Memorial Bridge, also known as the Braga Bridge, or simply, The Braga, is a through truss bridge that carries Interstate 195 over the Taunton River between the town of Somerset and the city of Fall River, near the mouth of the Quequechan River at the confluence with Mount Hope Bay. The Braga Bridge spans 1.25 miles (2.01 km) and is one of the longest bridges in Massachusetts. Opened to traffic on April 15, 1966, it provides an important link between Providence, Rhode Island, Fall River, New Bedford, and Cape Cod.

== Specifications ==
With a total span of 5,780 feet (1,760 m), and standing 135 feet (41 m) over high water in the Taunton River, the Braga Bridge easily accommodates the high-traffic shipping lane in the river. It is approximately 101 feet (31 m) wide, enough for six lanes of traffic. The Braga Bridge spans 1.2 miles (2 kilometers)

== History ==
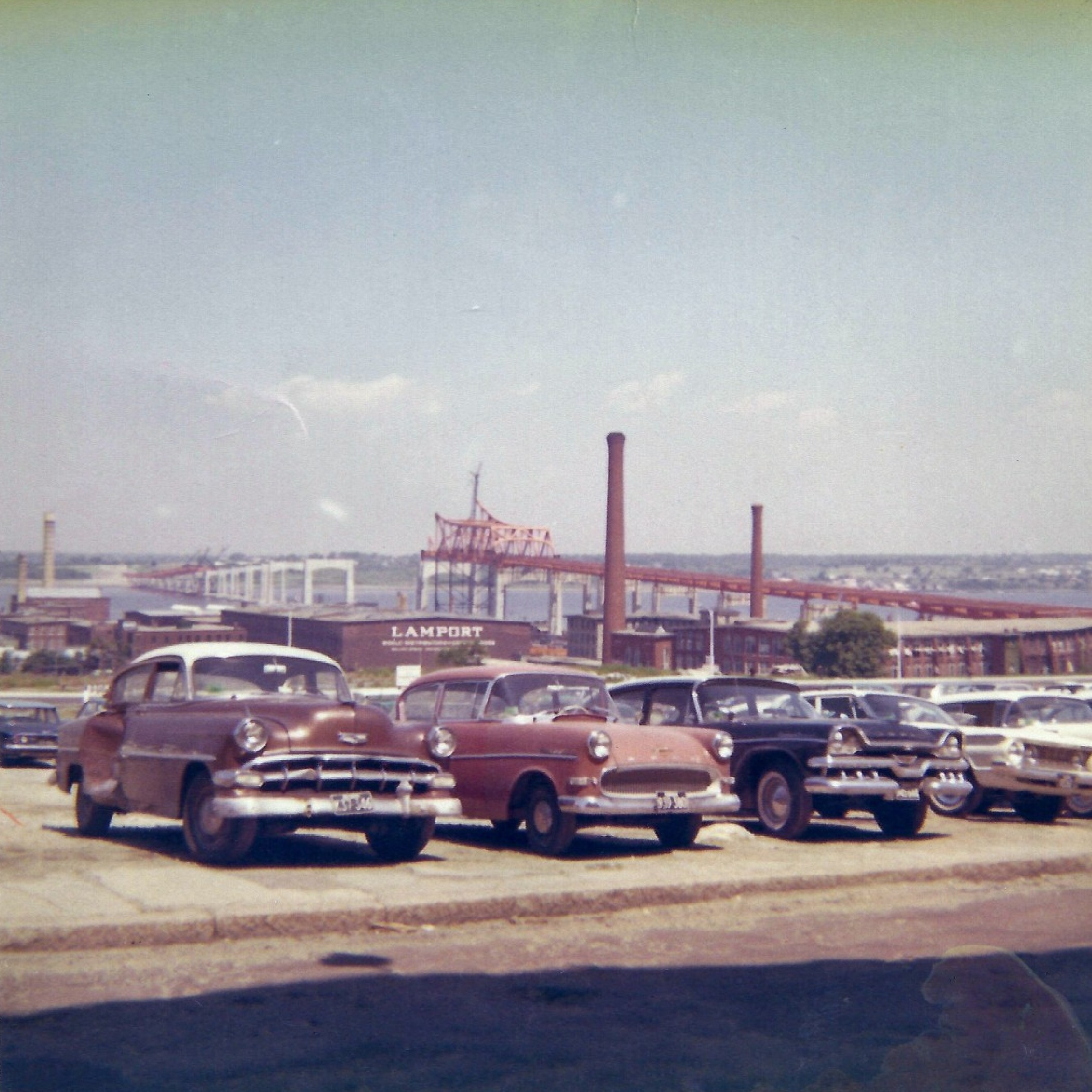
The Braga Bridge under construction

== Beginnings ==
Planning began in the early 1950s for a new bridge to ease the congestion of the nearby Slade's Ferry and Brightman Street Bridges, as well as to carry the proposed Cape Cod Expressway over the Taunton River. The original plan called for a "high level bridge" to be located much further north, near what is now the Veterans Memorial Bridge, with a highway passing through the north end of the city in a direct line to Wareham. In 1959, the role of the new bridge was changed to carrying the new Interstate 195 over the Taunton River, connecting Providence and New Bedford. Construction of the bridge started in 1959 and finished in the spring of 1966. The bridge was named after Charles M. Braga, a Fall River native of Portuguese American descent who was killed in the attack on Pearl Harbor.

== Recent history ==
As the Braga Bridge approached its 25th anniversary in 1989, the Massachusetts Department of Public Works (MassDPW) undertook a comprehensive two-year rehabilitation of the span and approaches. The project included the replacement of the existing deck with a new lightweight deck overlaid with bituminous concrete. Construction crews repaired and repainted structural steel along the length of the mile-long span, a new concrete Jersey barrier was built in the center median, and "suicide fences" were built along the span.

In 2003, the Massachusetts Highway Department began what was to be a three-year, $9 million rehabilitation of the Braga Bridge. The new top concrete layer of roadway was given a latex additive that resists water seepage to reduce cracking. Originally scheduled for completion in 2005, the end of the project was first rescheduled for 2006 because of delays associated with the nearby Government Center project along I-195 in Fall River.

In the late summer of 2009, a vote was held for the public to decide on a new color for the bridge. Over 7,000 votes were cast, with voters choosing a dark blue color over lime green (the original color), light blue, and silver. The work began on the new paint job April 11, 2010, and was originally scheduled for completion in June 2011. The estimated cost for the project at one time was $13.3 million. Construction work has expanded and continued into 2015 as part of the overall $197-million Route 79/Braga Bridge Improvement Project. Construction-related detours and delays were expected through at least the summer of 2016. In October 2016, all lanes of the bridge were open for travel and construction was finished.

== Role in Fall River history ==
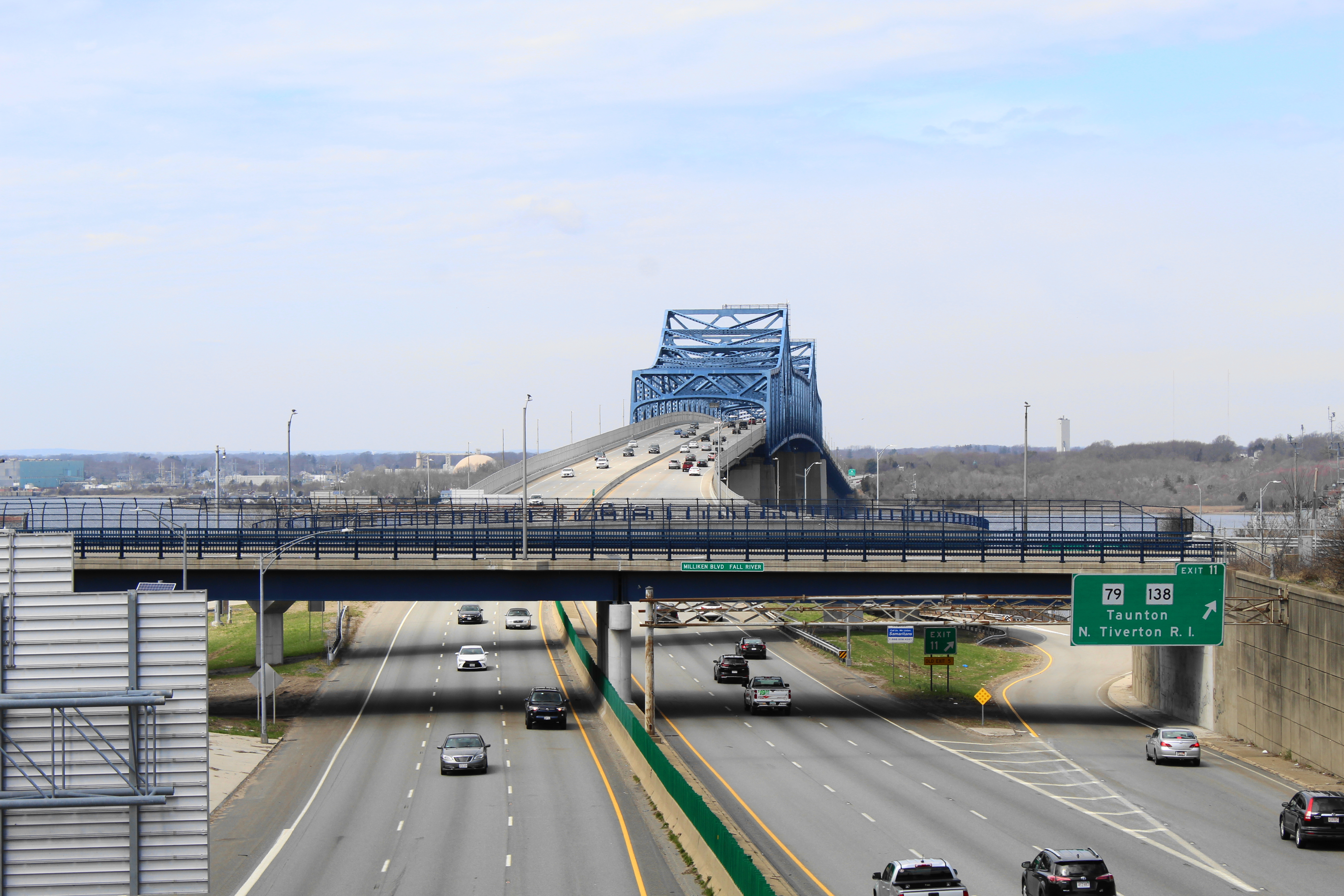
The eastern end of the bridge

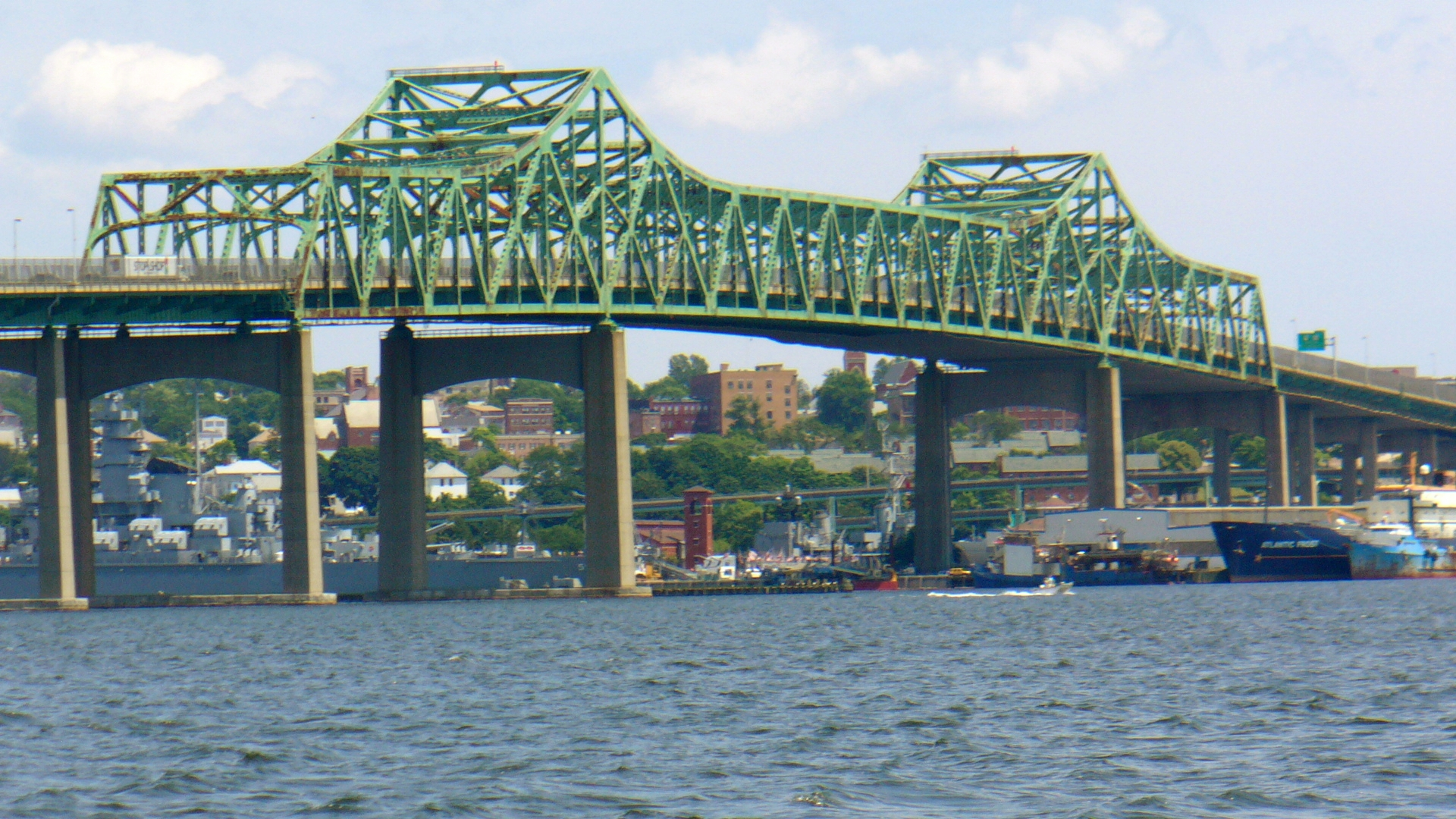
The bridge in its original green color.

The building of the Braga Bridge changed the city of Fall River in several ways. Firstly, its location caused large scale alterations to the Quequechan River. The falls of the river, which the city is named for, were channeled into tunnels which lead directly into the Taunton River. Also, because of the right-of-way of the bridge, a portion of the river upstream was narrowed (and in one spot, divided in half), changing the characteristics of the river. Plans have sporadically appeared to recreate the falls near the bridge, though none have ever materialized. Another change caused by the path of the bridge was the replacement of the former City Hall with the current Fall River Government Center, the first government building built over an interstate. Several other streets in the city were also realigned due to the construction of the highway, as well as the removal of the historic Granite Block, Troy Mills and several buildings of the Union Mills complex

The bridge itself is now seen as one of the icons of the city, often shown in the background of photographs of Battleship Cove and other views from across the Taunton River often include the bridge, given its central location in the geography of the city. Given its role as a part of Interstate 195, it is a landmark along the route for many vacationers towards Cape Cod. It is also a vital link in the area's transportation network, as it is the main route joining the South Coast region with Providence, Rhode Island. This was never as apparent as in March 1999, when falling cement acoustical tiles from under the nearby Fall River Government Center closed the highway for a week at the end of the bridge, causing traffic delays throughout the entire region.

== See also ==
- List of crossings of the Taunton River
- Brightman Street Bridge
- Veterans Memorial Bridge
