= Berkley–Dighton Bridge (1896) =

Berkley-Dighton Bridge
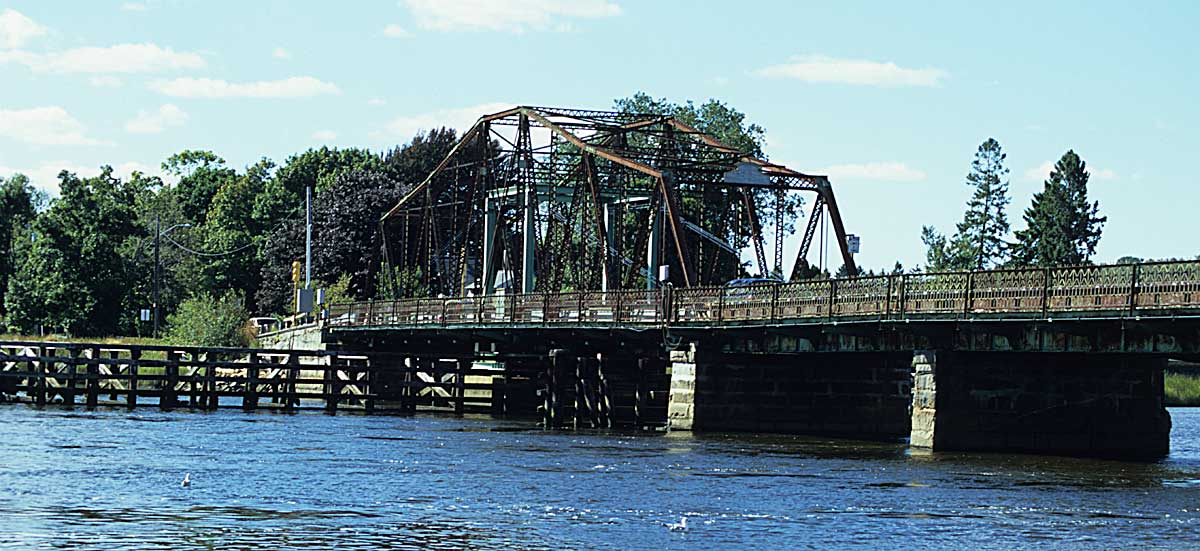
- The 1896 bridge near the end of its useful life
- Coordinates: 41°50′5.83″N 71°6′29.28″W
- Carries: vehicular and pedestrian traffic
- Crosses: Taunton River
- Locale: Berkley and Dighton, Massachusetts
- Preceded by: Weir St. Bridge
- Followed by: Veterans Memorial Bridge

Characteristics
- Design: swing bridge
- Width: 21.3 feet (6.5 m)
- Load limit: 3 short tons (2.7 t)
- Clearance below: 7 feet (2.1 m)

History
- Construction end: 1896
- Opened: 1896
- Closed: 2010
- Replaced by: Berkley–Dighton Bridge

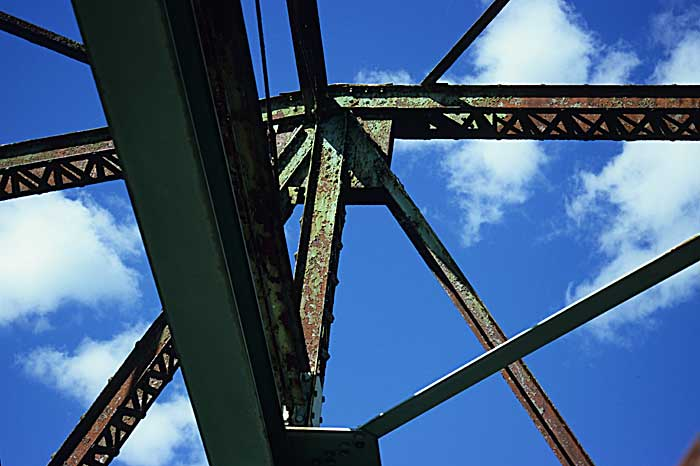
Truss detail showing deterioration

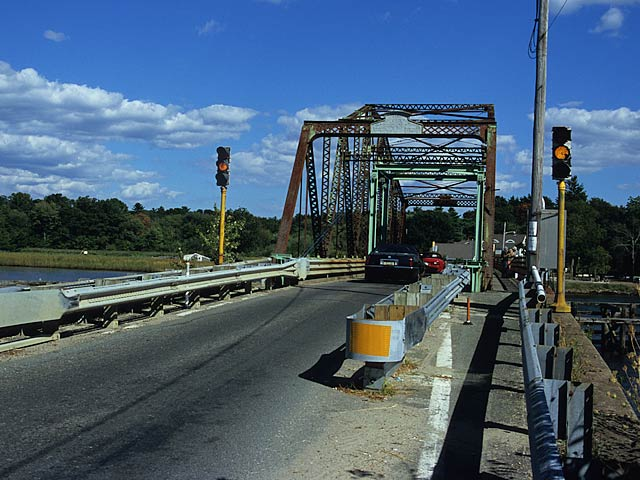
West portal showing traffic light

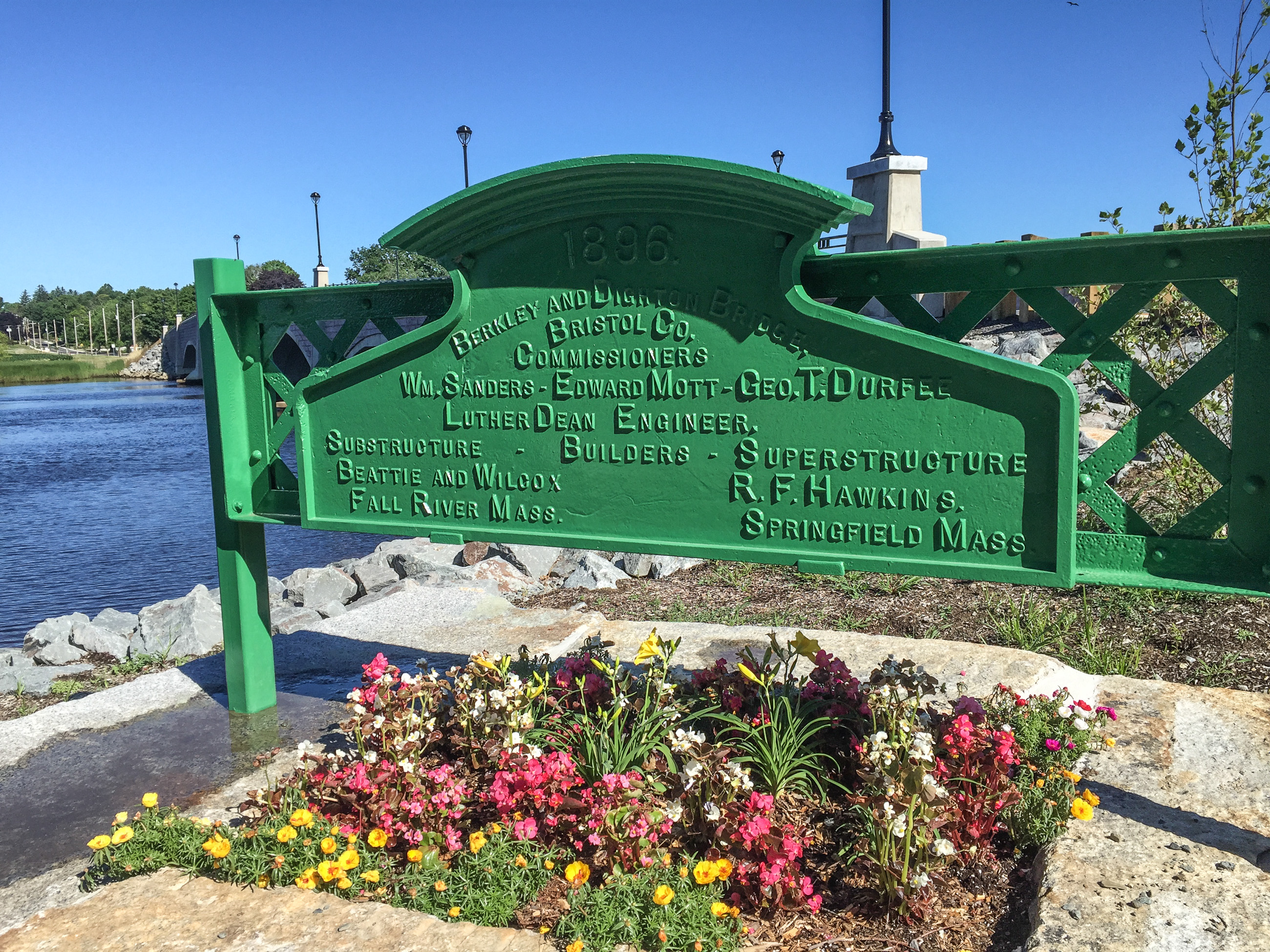
Sign crediting workers on the 1896 bridge

The third Berkley–Dighton Bridge was a paved one-lane swing-span bridge connecting the towns of Berkley and Dighton, Massachusetts. Built in 1896, it was the third at that location, and was demolished in September and October 2010.

Bridges at this location are the only crossing over the Taunton River between the Veterans Memorial Bridge in Fall River and the Weir Street Bridge in Taunton.

== History ==
The first bridge at the site was built in 1801. There was no bridge on the site from 1853 to 1873.

The third bridge was dedicated in 1896 with Luther Dean as the engineer, substructure built by Beattie and Wilcox of Fall River, Massachusetts, and superstructure built by R.F. Hawkins of Springfield, Massachusetts.

The bridge as built had two traffic lanes. However, the deterioration of the structure reduced the bridge's weight-bearing capacity, so traffic flow was restricted to one lane. Traffic over the bridge was controlled by traffic signals on each side, which alternately allowed eastbound and westbound traffic to use the single lane. The road approaching the bridge from Dighton (eastbound) is known as Center Street; approaching from Berkley (westbound) it is known as Elm Street.

The 1896 bridge was 21.3 feet (6.5 m) wide, and stood seven feet above mean high tide. It had a posted weight limit of 3 short tons (2.7 t) at the end of its useful life.

Proposals to replace the bridge were discussed for many years, starting no later than 1975. The Massachusetts Highway Department (MHD) replaced the Berkley–Dighton Bridge because it was seriously structurally deficient, its gears often jamming in the open position, forcing travelers miles to the north or south, and the inability for the bridge to handle emergency vehicles. The MHD estimated (2001 data) that 6,200 cars crossed the bridge each day. Bridge upgrade plans met with opposition for a variety of reasons, particularly concerns about the impact on local traffic. Commercial trucks were not allowed to use this bridge. Also, the traffic lights were only triggered by cars stopping on a line in the road. This was very problematic for people not familiar with the bridge.

== Opening the bridge ==
The towns of Dighton and Berkley paid a bridge tender to open the bridge as needed. Originally, the bridge was opened with a giant crank. The Dighton highway department installed a motor in the 1960s, though a tender was still required to grease the gears, unlock the bridge, remove some pins, and pull some switches to operate the mechanism.

== Fourth bridge ==
The current bridge is a fixed structure which opened on 28 August 2015.

== See also ==
- Berkley-Dighton Bridge - current bridge
- List of crossings of the Taunton River
