= Berkley =

Berkley may refer to:

== People ==
- Berkley (surname)
- Berkley Bedell (1921–2019), American politician
- Berkley Cox (1934–2024), Australian rules footballer

== Places ==
=== United Kingdom ===
- Berkley, Somerset
- Berkeley, Gloucestershire

=== United States ===
- Berkley, Colorado
- Berkley, Iowa
- Berkley, Maryland
- Berkley, Massachusetts
- Berkley, Michigan
- Berkley, Virginia, formerly a town, and now a neighborhood in Norfolk, Virginia
- Berkley (Washington, D.C.), a neighborhood also known as Foxhall Crescent

== Other uses ==
- Berkley Books, an imprint of Penguin Group (USA) (also known as Berkley Publishing Co.)
- Berkley Center for Religion, Peace, and World Affairs at Georgetown University, Washington, D.C., United States
- Berkley (fishing), a fishing tackle company, Spirit Lake, Iowa, United States
- Berkley Horse, a BDSM toy onto which the submissive is strapped and whipped by the dominant

== See also ==
- Berkley Bridge (disambiguation)
- Berkeley (disambiguation)
- Berklee College of Music in Boston, Massachusetts, United States
