= Berkley Bridge =

Berkley Bridge may refer to:

- Berkley Bridge (Virginia), on Interstate 264 in Norfolk, Virginia, US
- Berkley–Dighton Bridge, over the Taunton River in Massachusetts, US
  - Berkley–Dighton Bridge (1896)
