= Berkley–Dighton Bridge =

Berkley-Dighton Bridge
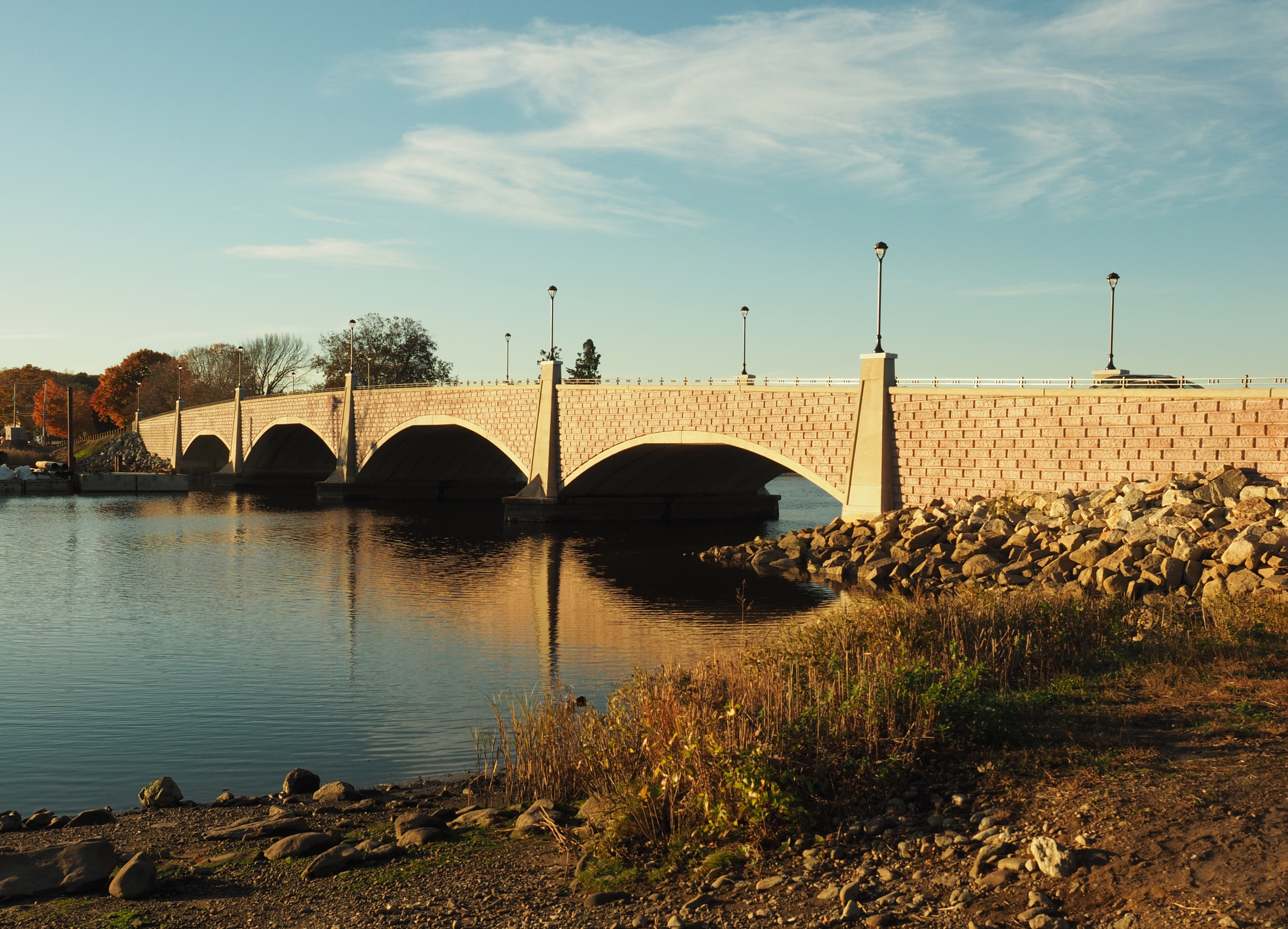
- View from Berkley shore, October 2015
- Coordinates: 41°50′5.83″N 71°6′29.28″W
- Carries: vehicular and pedestrian traffic
- Crosses: Taunton River
- Locale: Berkley and Dighton, Massachusetts
- Preceded by: Weir St. Bridge
- Followed by: Veterans Memorial Bridge

Characteristics
- Design: concrete arch bridge with closed spandrels
- Total length: approximately 350 feet (110 m)
- Width: 32 feet (9.8 m)
- Longest span: 2 × 92 feet (28 m)
- No. of spans: 4
- Clearance below: 12 feet (3.7 m)

History
- Construction start: July 2012
- Construction end: August 2015
- Replaces: Berkley–Dighton Bridge (1896)

The fourth Berkley–Dighton Bridge is a four-span concrete arch bridge with closed spandrel walls of cast-in-place concrete, using pile-supported abutments and piers. The bridge was made such that it appears to be constructed of stone masonry rather than concrete. The two end spans are 74 feet (23 m) and the two center spans are 92 feet (28 m) for a total bridge length of approximately 350 feet (110 m).

Bridges at this location are the only crossing over the Taunton River between the Veterans Memorial Bridge in Fall River and the Weir Street Bridge in Taunton.

Beginning in August 2010, a temporary bridge was in place while the new bridge was being built. Construction on the bridge began in July 2012. The new bridge opened to traffic on August 28, 2015.

== History ==
The first bridge at the site was built in 1801. There was no bridge on the site from 1853 to 1873. The third bridge was dedicated in 1896 and demolished in 2010. A temporary bridge served from 2010 to 2015. The current bridge opened to traffic on August 28, 2015

Proposals for the new bridge were discussed for many years, starting no later than 1975. The Massachusetts Highway Department (MHD) replaced the third Berkley–Dighton Bridge because it was seriously structurally deficient, its swing span gears often jammed in the open position, forcing travelers miles to the north or south, and due to the inability for the bridge to handle emergency vehicles. The MHD estimates (2001 data) that 6,200 cars crossed the bridge each day. Bridge upgrade plans were met with opposition for a variety of reasons, including concerns about the impact on local traffic. Commercial trucks were not allowed to use the old bridge. Also, the traffic lights were only triggered by cars stopping on a line in the road. This was very problematic for people not familiar with the bridge.

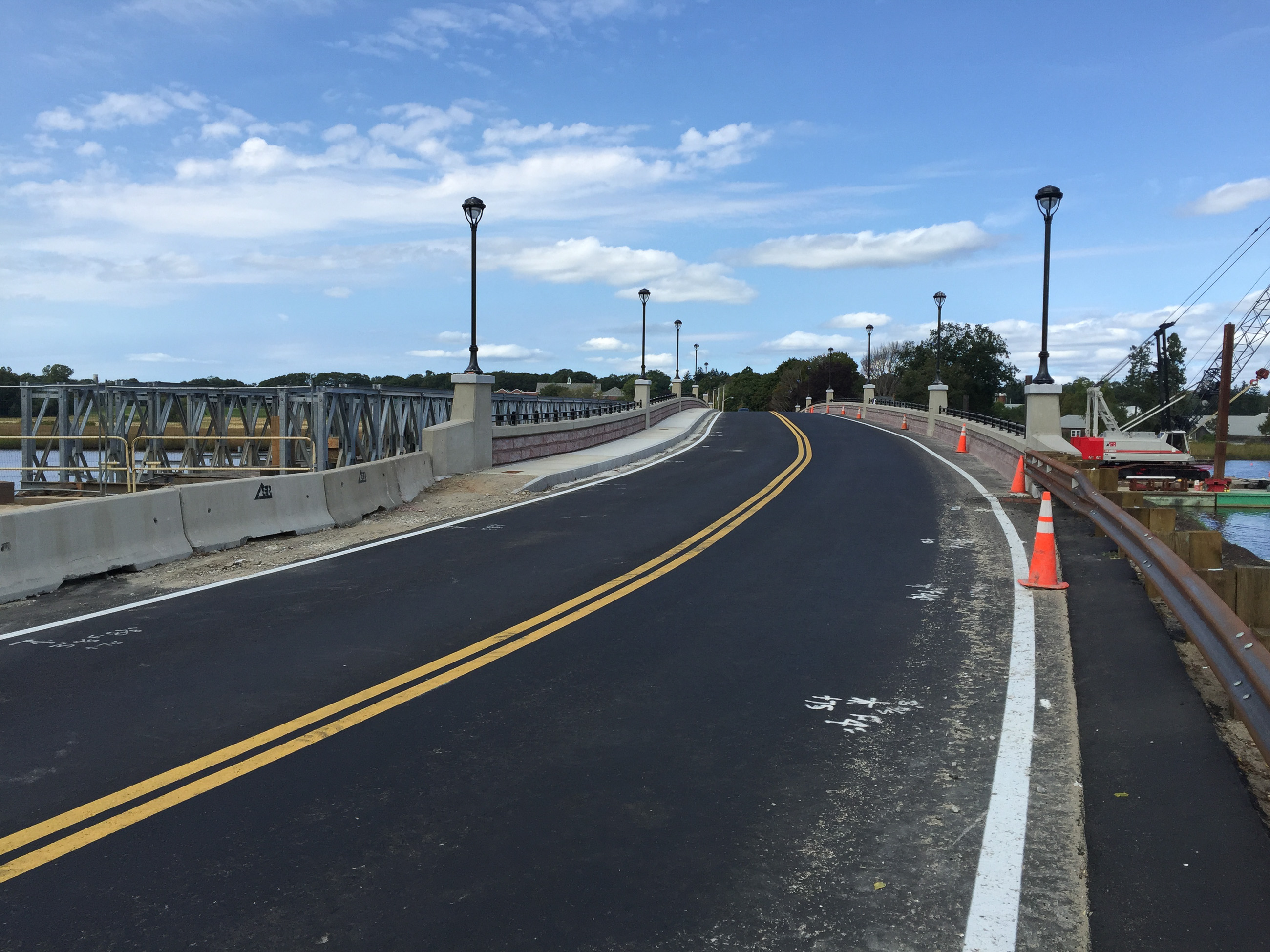
The newly opened span in September 2015

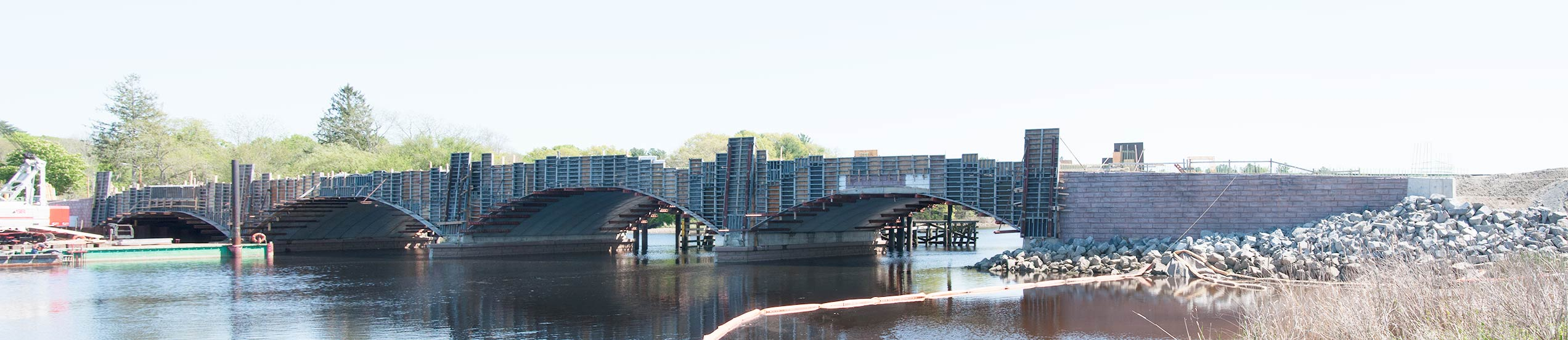
Berkley-Dighton Bridge under construction. Arches are complete, but spandrels are not.

The current bridge is a fixed structure, consisting of four pre-cast arch spans with closed spandrel walls of cast-in-place concrete, with approximately the same footprint as the previous bridge, using pile-supported abutments and piers. The finished bridge was made such that it appears to be constructed of stone masonry rather than concrete. The two end spans are 74 feet (23 m) and the two center spans are 92 feet (28 m) for a total bridge length of approximately 350 feet (110 m). In Fall 2014, the arches were built from segments trucked in. The arches are ten segment widths wide and were brought in as half-arches.

The bridge is wider than the previous bridge by a total of approximately 12 feet (3.7 m), split between both sides of the old bridge, for a total of 32 feet (9.8 m) defined as two traffic lanes plus a 5.5-foot (1.7 m) sidewalk on the south (downstream) side of the bridge, similar to the previous bridge. A minimum of 12-foot (3.7 m) vertical clearance must be maintained from the mean high water line at the main span, requiring the roadway to be raised approximately 8.25 feet (2.51 m) higher than its previous level. Other improvements include ADA-compliant sidewalks, wheelchair ramps, and driveway transitions, as well as better drainage, curbing, signage, guardrail, and pavement markings.

== Temporary bridge ==
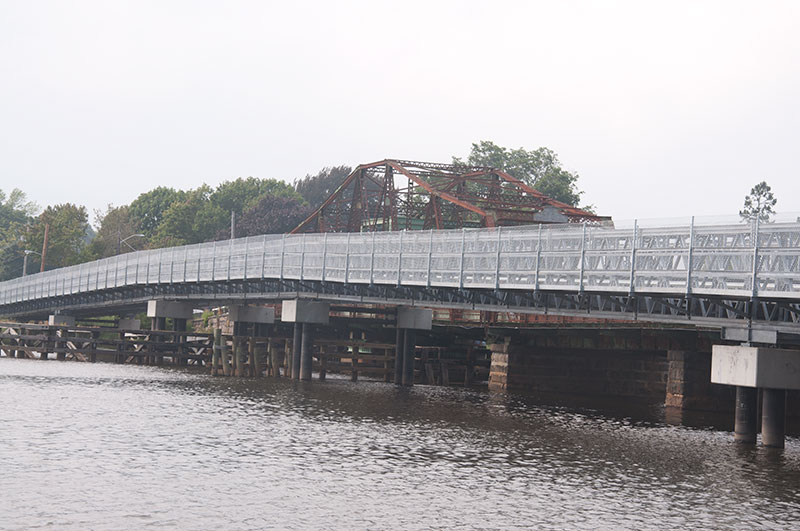
Temporary bridge

A temporary one-lane bridge was provided during construction to the south of the permanent bridge site. The temporary bridge had improved weight capacity, allowing emergency vehicles to use it. This bridge opened on August 16, 2010. The structure was a 3rd generation Bailey bridge. Once the main bridge opened, the temporary bridge was removed.

== See also ==
- List of crossings of the Taunton River
