= List of crossings of the Taunton River =

This is a list of bridges and other crossings of the Taunton River, from its mouth at the Mount Hope Bay upstream to its source at the confluence of the Town River and Matfield River, near the Paper Mill Village neighborhood of the town of Bridgewater, Massachusetts.

Crossing	Image	Carries	Location	Built	Coordinates
Charles M. Braga, Jr. Bridge		I-195	Somerset to Fall River	1966	41°42′23.62″N 71°09′56.51″W
Slade's Ferry Bridge (demolished 1970)		originally rail and road traffic	Somerset to Fall River	1875	41°43′14.99″N 71°9′31.00″W
Brightman Street Bridge (closed to all traffic in 2011)		formerly carried US 6 / Route 138	Somerset to Fall River	1908	41°43′26.26″N 71°09′20.51″W
Veterans Memorial Bridge		US 6 / Route 138	Somerset to Fall River	2011	41°43′35.18″N 71°9′6.24″W
rail bridge (demolished)			Somerset to Fall River		41°46′12″N 71°07′13″W
temporary Bailey bridge (removed 2015)		Elm Street (Berkley); Center Street (Dighton)	Berkley and Dighton	2009	41°50′05.55″N 71°06′29.71″W
Berkley–Dighton Bridge		Elm Street (Berkley); Center Street (Dighton)	Berkley and Dighton	2015	41°50′05.83″N 71°06′29.28″W
Berkley-Dighton Bridge (demolished 2010)		Elm Street (Berkley); Center Street (Dighton)	Berkley and Dighton	1896	41°50′05.83″N 71°06′29.28″W
Weir Bridge		Plain Street	Taunton	1953	41°53′09.89″N 71°05′20.62″W
rail bridge (off Ingell Street, Weir Village)		Middleboro Subdivision	Taunton		41°53′15.29″N 71°05′05.28″W
Edward McCarthy Memorial Bridge		Route 140 (County Street)	Taunton	1972	41°53′48.30″N 71°04′53.76″W
rail bridge (off County Street)		Massachusetts Coastal Railroad	Taunton		41°54′00.65″N 71°04′59.63″W
rail bridge (off Dean Street)		Massachusetts Coastal Railroad	Taunton		41°54′12.85″N 71°04′54.64″W
John Joseph Donahue Memorial Bridge		Honorable Gordon Owen Riverway	Taunton	1975	41°54′11.77″N 71°04′32.38″W
Harris Street Bridge		closed	Taunton	1887	41°54′20.12″N 71°04′09.74″W
Route 24 bridge		Route 24	Raynham		41°54′06.12″N 71°02′42.90″W
Old Colony Avenue (East Taunton); South Street East (Raynham)			Taunton and Raynham	1945	41°53′09.56″N 71°01′48.07″W
Church Street Bridge		Church Street	Raynham	1977	41°53′37.06″N 71°00′10.54″W
SFC Jared C. Monti Bridge		US 44	Taunton and Raynham		41°54′11.59″N 70°59′44.88″W
I-495		I-495	Middleborough and Raynham		41°55′25.00″N 70°59′47.82″W; 41.92361°N 70.996616°W
World War I Veterans Memorial Bridge (aka Pratts Bridge)		Vernon Street	Middleborough and Bridgewater	1956	41°55′56.49″N 70°59′35.07″W
World War II Veterans Memorial Bridge (aka Sturtevant Bridge)		Plymouth Street in North Middleboro./ Green Street	Middleborough and Bridgewater		41°56′10.74″N 70°59′14.21″W
Desert Storm Veterans Memorial Bridge		Route 18 / Route 28	Middleborough and Bridgewater	2007	41°56′12.24″N 70°57′56.26″W
Titicut Street Bridge		Titicut Street	Middleborough and Bridgewater		41°56′02.38″N 70°57′23.47″W
rail bridge			Middleborough and Bridgewater		41°56′20.57″N 70°56′25.69″W
Vietnam Veterans Memorial Bridge (aka Woodward Bridge)		Summer Street	Middleborough and Bridgewater	2012	41°56′50.99″N 70°56′11.55″W
Auburn Street Bridge (ruin)		Auburn Street	Middleborough and Bridgewater		41°57′47.70″N 70°54′44.10″W
Childs Bridge		Cherry Street	Bridgewater and Halifax		41°58′42.48″N 70°54′43.73″W
Plymouth Street		Route 104	Bridgewater		41°59′33.29″N 70°56′23.46″W

River source at the convergence of the Town River and the Matfield River: 41°59′45.09″N 70°56′35.30″W
