= Berkley (surname) =

Berkley is a surname. Notable people with the surname include:

- Austin Berkley (born 1973), former English professional footballer
- Elizabeth Berkley (born 1972), American TV and film actress
- George Berkley (engineer) (1821–1893), British civil engineer
- Richard L. Berkley (1931–2023), mayor of Kansas City, Missouri (1979–1991)
- Robyn Berkley, fashion publicist
- Seth Berkley (born 1956), American epidemiologist
- Shelley Berkley (born 1951), U.S. Congresswoman
- Theresa Berkley (died 1836), 19th century London dominatrix
- W.R. Berkley (born 1946), Insurance Tycoon. Founder for W. R. Berkley Corporation
