= Harris Bridge =

Harris Bridge may refer to:

- Harris Bridge (Americus, Kansas), listed on the National Register of Historic Places in Lyon County, Kansas
- Harris Street Bridge, Taunton, Massachusetts, listed on the NRHP in Massachusetts
- Harris Bridge (Wren, Oregon), listed on the National Register of Historic Places in Benton County, Oregon
