= Brightman Street Bridge =

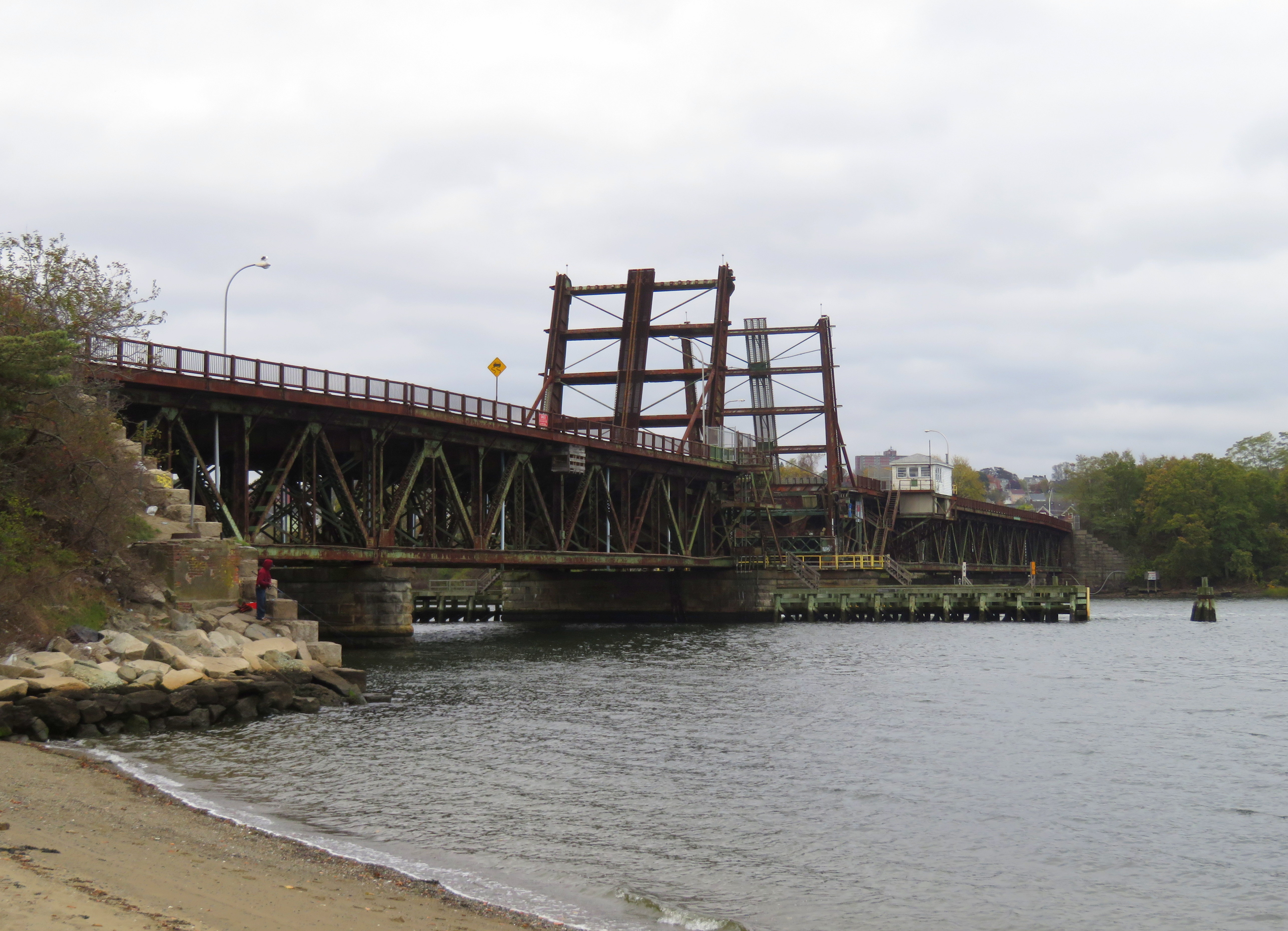
- The disused bridge in October 2020
- Coordinates: 41°43′26.26″N 71°09′20.51″W
- Carries: closed to all traffic
- Crosses: Taunton River
- Locale: Somerset to Fall River, Massachusetts

Characteristics
- Design: two-leaf bascule bridge
- Total length: 922 ft
- Longest span: 98 ft
- Clearance below: 27 ft

History
- Construction start: 1906
- Construction end: 1908
- Opened: October 10, 1908
- Closed: October 11, 2011

Location
- Interactive map of Brightman Street Bridge

The Brightman Street Bridge is a 922-foot (281 m) long, four-lane wide drawbridge spanning the Taunton River between the town of Somerset and the city of Fall River, Massachusetts. It was authorized in 1903 by the state legislature, and building took place between 1906 and 1908, when it opened full-time on October 10, 1908. It was closed to vehicular traffic on October 11, 2011.

At the time of its completion, it was the widest bridge to span the Taunton River, as the Slade's Ferry Bridge, a steel swingspan bridge built in 1875 less than a quarter mile downriver, was barely a two lane bridge. It once served as the pathway for Route 6 and Route 138 to cross the river into Fall River. Now the Veterans Memorial Bridge, just upstream, carries these routes between Somerset and Fall River.

== Replacement ==
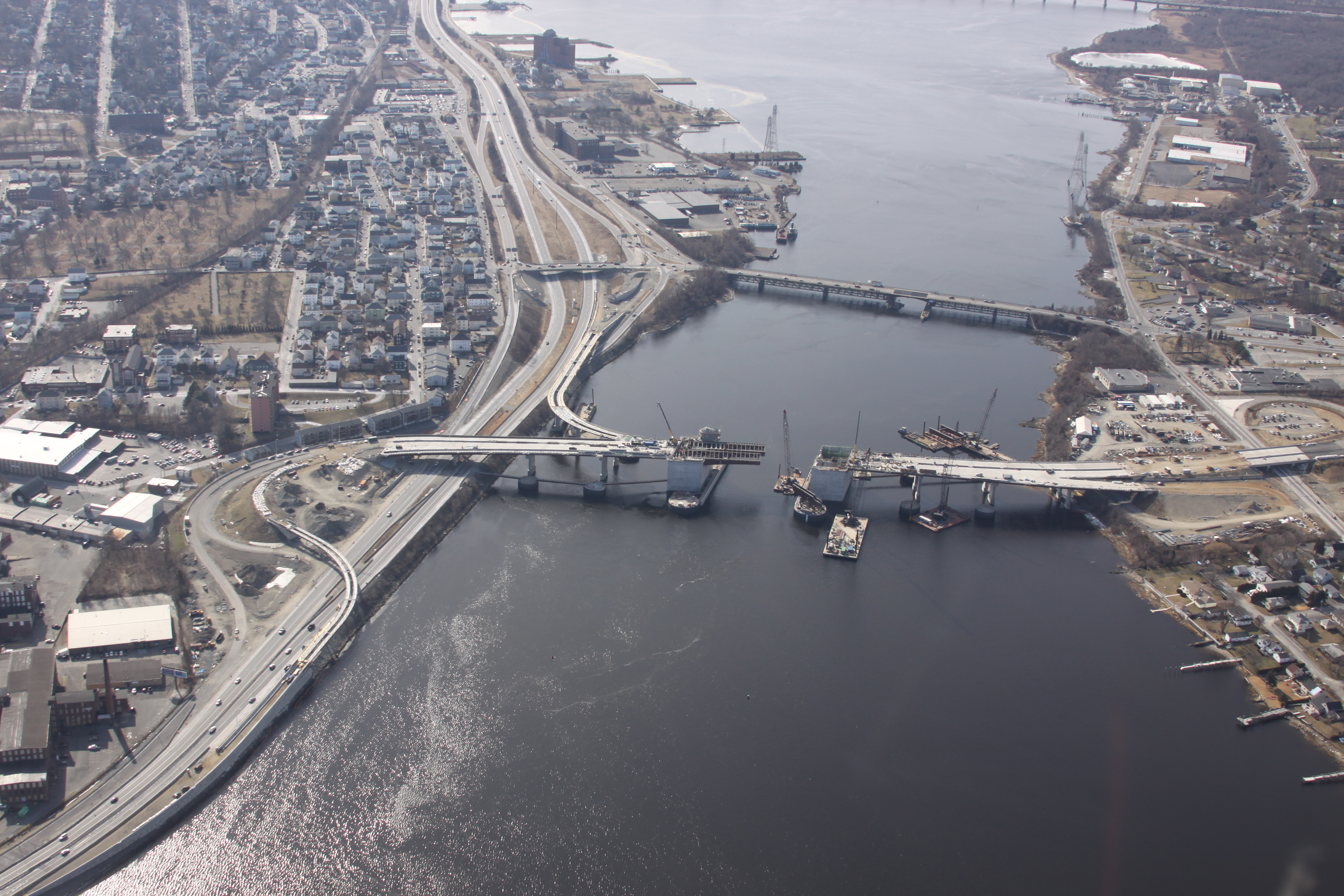
The replacement bridge under construction (foreground) and the Brightman Street Bridge in 2010

With the age of the bridge becoming a problem, as well as the rising costs of necessary upkeep and maintenance, talk began circulating about replacing the bridge as early as the late 1970s and early 1980s. Starting in 1983, plans were put in place to replace the bridge with a new, higher and wider span 1,500 feet (460 m) upriver, which would span from a proposed flyover intersection with Route 79 on the Fall River side, to a new access road through the former site of Slade's Ferry Park in Somerset.

Plans were put on hold in 1989, when the Coast Guard protested the size of the opening of the bridge. Once details were worked out, work began in the late 1990s, but again with delays. This was due to money being taken away from the project for the well-over budget Big Dig project in Boston. Again the work was delayed until costs could be met. A third problem arose in 2008, when inspectors questioned the quality of the cement used in the main pilings for the bridge. This caused yet more delays as inspections and tests were needed on the piers. The bridge was finally completed in 2011.

Around 2005, local officials pushed to keep the bridge intact even after its replacement was completed, as a way to stop the controversial LNG terminal to the north.

== See also ==
- List of crossings of the Taunton River
