= Harris Street Bridge =

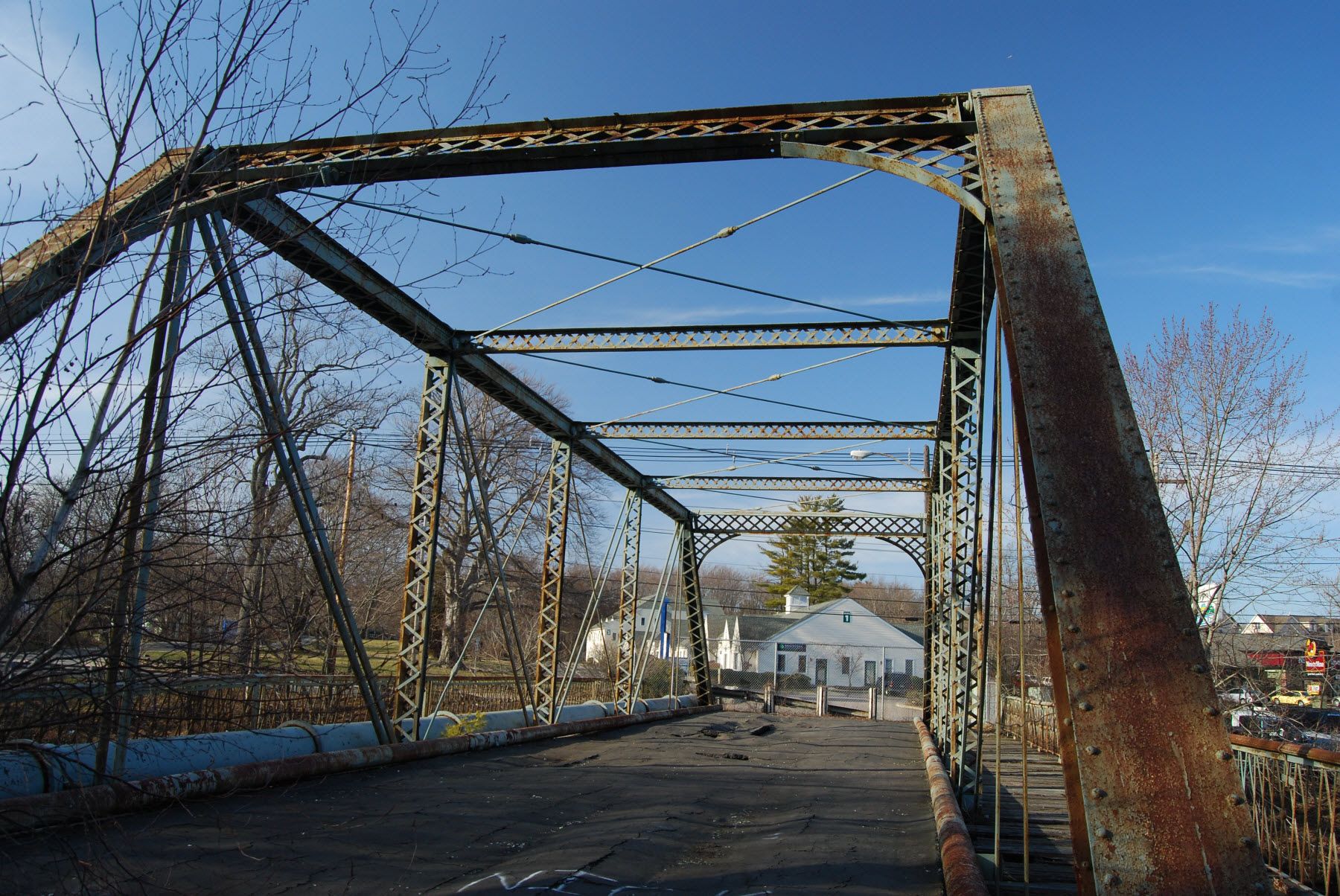
- Coordinates: 41°54′20.27″N 71°4′9.63″W
- Carries: water main
- Crosses: Taunton River
- Locale: Taunton, Massachusetts

Characteristics
- Design: pin-connected through Pratt truss
- Material: Wrought iron
- Total length: 100 feet (30 m)
- Width: 35 feet (11 m)
- Height: 35 feet (11 m)
- No. of spans: 1

History
- Architect: Pembridge Company
- Constructed by: Pennsylvania Bridge Company
- Construction end: 1887
- Harris Street Bridge
- U.S. National Register of Historic Places
- Location within Massachusetts Location within the United States
- Location: Off Dean Street, Taunton, Massachusetts
- Built: 1887
- MPS: Taunton MRA
- NRHP reference No.: 84002123
- Added to NRHP: July 5, 1984

Location
- Interactive map of Harris Street Bridge

The Harris Street Bridge is a historic truss bridge that spans the Taunton River off Dean Street in Taunton, Massachusetts. Built in 1887, it is the oldest surviving bridge in the city, and was built as part of one of the city's earliest public works projects after incorporation as a city. It was added to the National Register of Historic Places in 1984. It is closed to traffic, and is in disrepair.

== Description and history ==
The Harris Street Bridge is located southeast of the junction of Dean Street (United States Route 44) and River Street in eastern Taunton. Dean Street parallels the Taunton River. When the bridge was built in 1887, it crossed on Harris Street, which is now dead-ended on the south bank of the river to the east. The bridge is a single-span through Pratt truss 100 feet (30 m) long, 35 feet (11 m) wide, and 35 feet (11 m) tall, with a span of 95 feet (29 m). The truss elements are wrought iron and are fastened together by pins.

The bridge was built in 1887 by the Pennsylvania Bridge Company, and is one of only two known bridges in Massachusetts built by them. Its principal purpose was to carry a water main from the nearby Harris Street Pumping Station to the center of the city. Its secondary function was as a road and pedestrian bridge.

The bridge has been closed to vehicular and pedestrian traffic for many years and its deck and railings are in serious disrepair. It still serves its original primary function, carrying a water pipe over the Taunton River.

== See also ==
- National Register of Historic Places listings in Taunton, Massachusetts
- List of crossings of the Taunton River
- List of bridges on the National Register of Historic Places in Massachusetts
