= W. R. Berkley =

American billionaire businessman (1946–2026)

William R. Berkley

Chairman of the New York University Board of Trustees
- In office 2014–2026
- Preceded by: Martin Lipton

Personal details
- Born: 1946
- Died: June 9, 2026 (aged 80)
- Education: New York University (BA); Harvard Business School (MBA)

William Robert Berkley (1946 – June 9, 2026) was an American business executive who was the founder and chairman of W. R. Berkley Corporation, and the chairman of the New York University Board of Trustees.

With a net worth of $6.7 billion, he ranked 239th on the 2025 edition of the Forbes 400.

== Early life and education ==
Berkley grew up in North Jersey, the middle child of three boys. When he was 11 years old, his father was killed in an airplane crash. He started investing in the stock market at age 12 with money he made from lawn mowing.

He graduated from the New York University Stern School of Business with an undergraduate degree in 1966. He received an MBA from Harvard Business School in 1968. While at Harvard, he ran a $2 million mutual fund out of an apartment on the Harvard campus with a classmate, Paul Dean.

== Career ==
In 1967, he founded W. R. Berkley Corporation. In November 1973, when the company became a public company via an initial public offering, he owned 23.8% of the company. In 2015, he left the CEO position to become executive chairman, following which his son Rob Berkley Jr. took over as CEO.

Berkley served as chairman of board at New York University, his alma mater, from 2014.

== Personal life and death ==
Berkley was married to Marjorie, who was his secretary when he founded his company. They had three children. He died on June 9, 2026, at the age of 80.
