= Veterans Memorial Bridge (Bristol County, Massachusetts) =

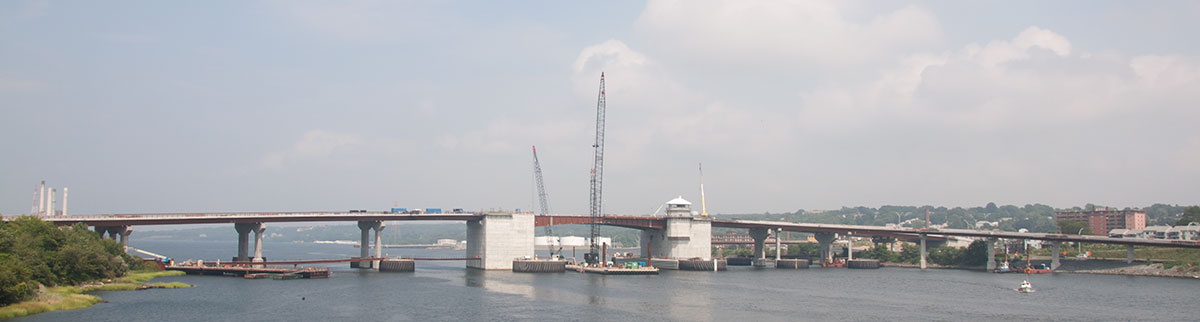
- Veterans Memorial Bridge, August 5, 2010
- Coordinates: 41°43′35.18″N 71°9′6.24″W
- Carries: US 6 / Route 138
- Crosses: Taunton River
- Locale: Somerset, Massachusetts and Fall River, Massachusetts
- Official name: Veterans Memorial Bridge
- Maintained by: MassDOT Highway Division

Characteristics
- Design: two-leaf bascule bridge
- Longest span: 200 feet (61 m)
- Clearance below: 60 feet (18 m)

History
- Construction start: May 17, 2007
- Construction end: Fall 2011
- Opened: October 11, 2011

The Veterans Memorial Bridge is a bascule bridge connecting Somerset, Massachusetts and Fall River, Massachusetts. The bridge carries U.S. Route 6 and Route 138 over the Taunton River, with connecting ramps to Route 79, and includes a bike path on its north side. The $290 million bridge was dedicated to area veterans on September 11, 2011. The bike path was also dedicated in a separate ceremony that same day in honor of Pvt. Michael E. Bouthot, who was killed in action in Iraq in 2006.

The Veterans Memorial Bridge now serves as the pathway for Route 6 and Route 138 to cross the river into Fall River. Other than the Berkley-Dighton Bridge 8½ miles to the north, it is the only non-highway bridge spanning the river between Fall River and Taunton. Along with the Braga Bridge, it is one of the two major crossings of the river. This has led to the bridge having vital importance anytime there is a problem on the Braga; since the northern detour takes approximately twenty miles and the southern detour (over the Mount Hope Bridge and the Sakonnet River Bridge) is over twenty-five miles, it immediately becomes the major path for people coming in and out of the city, and vice versa.

== Name ==
Before being named, this bridge was known as the replacement Brightman Street Bridge. The name "Miguel Corte-Real Bridge" was also suggested for use on the new bridge. On November 13, 2009, Chapter 140 of the Acts of 2009 became law, officially naming this bridge the Veterans Memorial Bridge.

== History ==
Planning for this bridge started no later than 1998, but was delayed due to its funding being siphoned off by the Big Dig project. Construction finally began in May 2007. After much delay, the dedication ceremony for the bridge occurred on September 11, 2011. The westbound lanes opened to traffic on September 12, 2011, with the eastbound lanes opening on October 11, 2011.

== Gallery ==
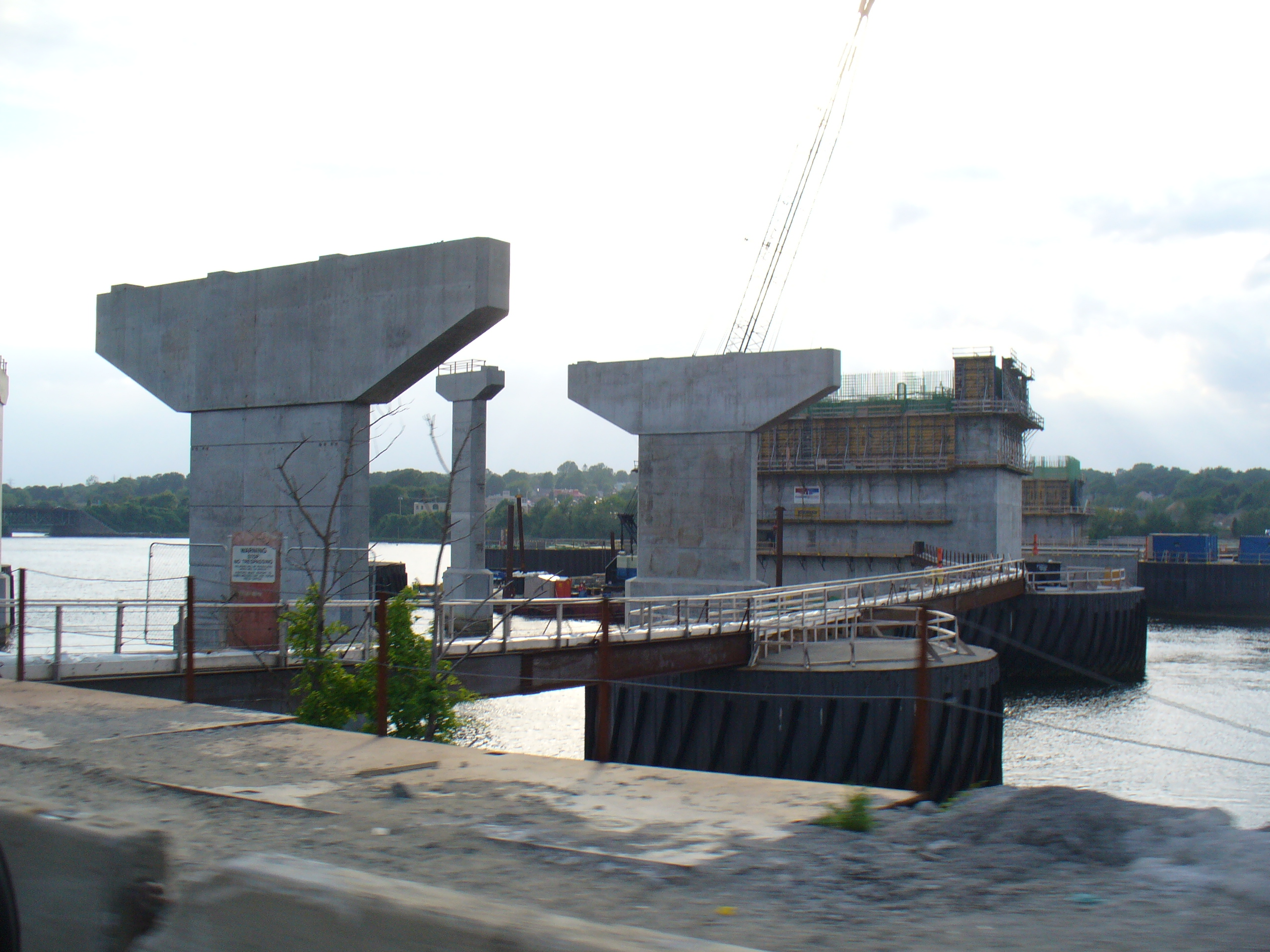
The construction site of the new Brightman Street bridge as of June 2008

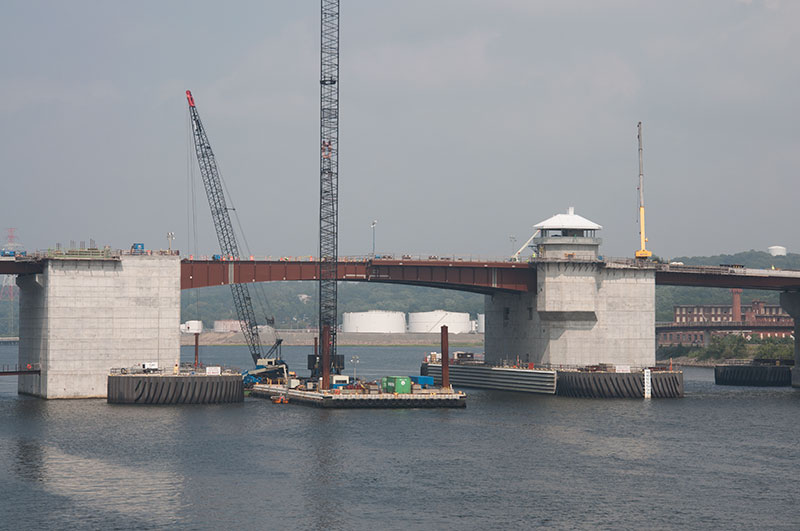
Center span under construction, August 2010

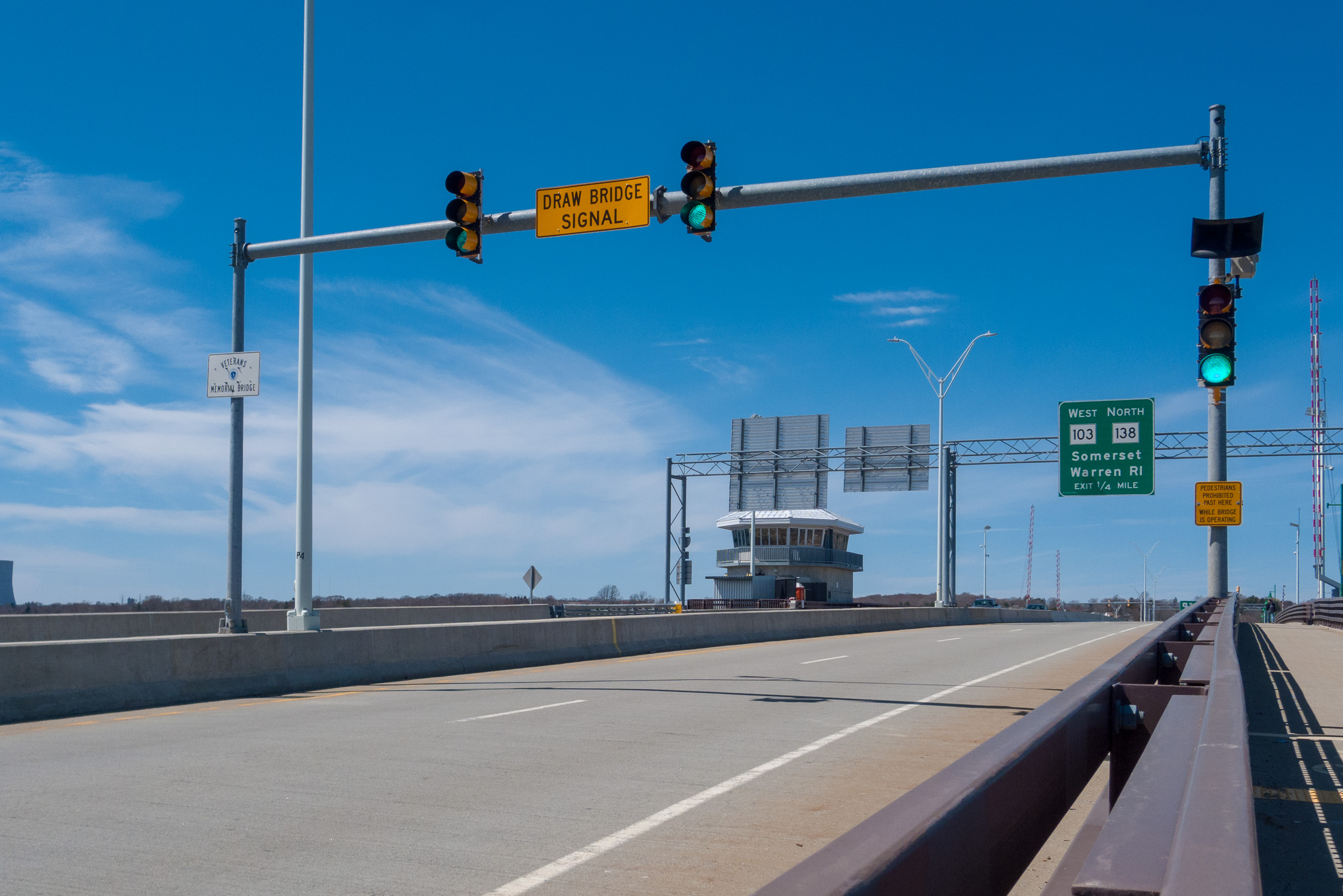
View of the roadway from the pedestrian path

== Bridge features ==
The Veterans Memorial Bridge features upgrades from the previous Brightman Street Bridge, including a much wider walkway/bikeway and fishing pier. The center span is also significantly taller and wider than the Brightman's, decreasing the frequency of traffic delays from the bridge opening due to a passing boat underneath.

== See also ==
- List of crossings of the Taunton River
