= Massachusetts Highway Department =

Former government agency in Massachusetts, USA

Department overview
- Formed: 1991; 35 years ago
- Preceding agencies: Massachusetts Highway Commission (1893–1919); Massachusetts Department of Public Works (1919–1991)
- Dissolved: October 31, 2009; 16 years ago
- Superseding department: Highway Division of the Massachusetts Department of Transportation
- Jurisdiction: Massachusetts
- Employees: 1,850
- Website: Official website

The Massachusetts Highway Department (abbreviated MassHighway) was the highway department in the U.S. state of Massachusetts from 1991 until the formation of the Massachusetts Department of Transportation (MassDOT) in 2009.

The responsibilities of MassHighway included the design, construction and maintenance of all state highways and bridges and signage of numbered routes. During that time it was a part of the Massachusetts Executive Office of Transportation (EOT), which was also reorganized into the Department of Transportation. As part of the reorganization, the separate Massachusetts Turnpike Authority was dissolved and its duties assumed by the MassDOT highway division.

The department was split into five district offices managed by a district highway director (DHD) under the supervision of the chief engineer at MassHighway headquarters in Boston. This district plan has been continued under MassDOT and the Boston area (westward along the Mass Turnpike to Weston and south through to Randolph) was the basis for a sixth district in 2010.

The Massachusetts Highway Department conducts an annual traffic data collection program. A traffic counting program is conducted each year by the Statewide Traffic Data Collection section of the Massachusetts Highway Department. This data is available online by autoroute and city/town list or as an interactive map. The 2009 program involved the systematic collection of traffic data utilizing automatic traffic recorders located on various roadways throughout the state.

== History ==
The Massachusetts Highway Commission was established in 1893 with three commissioners appointed by the governor. It was responsible for assisting local governments with road design, construction, mapping and organization. The commission was replaced in 1919 by the Massachusetts Department of Public Works (DPW), which became the main state agency overseeing all aspects of road construction and maintenance. The DPW was renamed the Massachusetts Highway Department in 1991.

== Districts ==
=== District 1 ===
District 1 of the Highway Division covers the following cities and towns:

Adams, Alford, Ashfield, Becket, Blandford, Buckland, Charlemont, Cheshire, Chester, Chesterfield, Clarksburg, Colrain, Conway, Cummington, Dalton, Egremont, Florida, Goshen, Granville, Great Barrington, Hancock, Hawley, Heath, Hinsdale, Huntington, Lanesborough, Lee, Lenox, Middlefield, Monroe, Monterey, Montgomery, Mount Washington, New Ashford, New Marlborough, North Adams, Otis, Peru, Pittsfield, Plainfield, Richmond, Rowe, Russell, Sandisfield, Savoy, Sheffield, Shelburne, Stockbridge, Tolland, Tyringham, Washington, West Stockbridge, Williamsburg, Williamstown, Windsor, Worthington.

=== District 2 ===
District 2 of the Highway Division covers the following cities and towns:

Agawam, Amherst, Athol, Barre, Belchertown, Bernardston, Brimfield, Chicopee, Deerfield, East Longmeadow, Easthampton, Erving, Gill, Granby, Greenfield, Hadley, Hampden, Hardwick, Hatfield, Holland, Holyoke, Leverett, Leyden, Longmeadow, Ludlow, Monson, Montague, New Braintree, New Salem, Northampton, Northfield, Orange, Palmer, Pelham, Petersham, Phillipston, Royalston, Shutesbury, South Hadley, Southampton, Southwick, Springfield, Sunderland, Templeton, Wales, Ware, Warren, Warwick, Wendell, West Brookfield, West Springfield, Westfield, Westhampton, Whately, Wilbraham, Winchendon.

=== District 3 ===
District 3 of the Highway Division covers the following cities and towns:

Acton, Ashburnham, Ashby, Ashland, Auburn, Ayer, Bellingham, Berlin, Blackstone, Bolton, Boxborough, Boylston, Brookfield, Charlton, Clinton, Douglas, Dudley, Dunstable, East Brookfield, Fitchburg, Framingham, Franklin, Gardner, Grafton, Groton, Harvard, Holden, Holliston, Hopedale, Hopkinton, Hubbardston, Hudson, Lancaster, Leicester, Leominster, Littleton, Lunenberg, Marlborough, Maynard, Medfield, Medway, Mendon, Milford, Millbury, Millis, Millville, Natick, North Brookfield, Northborough, Northbridge, Oakham, Oxford, Paxton, Pepperell, Princeton, Rutland, Sherborn, Shirley, Shrewsbury, Southborough, Southbridge, Spencer, Sterling, Stow Sturbridge, Sudbury, Sutton, Townsend, Upton, Uxbridge, Wayland, Webster, West Boylston, Westborough, Westford, Westminster, Worcester.

=== District 4 ===
District 4 of the Highway Division covers the following cities and towns:

Amesbury, Andover, Arlington, Bedford, Belmont, Beverly, Billerica, Boxford, Burlington, Carlisle, Chelmsford, Concord, Danvers, Dracut, Essex, Everett, Georgetown, Gloucester, Groveland, Hamilton, Haverhill, Ipswich, Lawrence, Lexington, Lincoln, Lowell, Lynn, Lynnfield, Malden, Manchester-By-The-Sea, Marblehead, Medford, Melrose, Merrimac, Methuen, Middleton, Nahant, Newbury, Newburyport, North Andover, North Reading, Peabody, Reading, Revere, Rockport, Rowley, Salem, Salisbury, Saugus, Somerville, Stoneham, Swampscott, Tewksbury, Topsfield, Tyngsborough, Wakefield, Waltham, Wenham, West Newbury, Wilmington, Winchester, Woburn.

=== District 5 ===
District 5 of the Highway Division covers the following cities and towns:

Abington, Acushnet, Aquinnah, Attleboro, Avon, Barnstable, Berkley, Bourne, Brewster, Bridgewater, Brockton, Carver, Chatham, Chilmark, Cohasset, Dartmouth, Dennis, Dighton, Duxbury, East Bridgewater, Eastham, Easton, Edgartown, Fairhaven, Fall River, Falmouth, Foxborough, Freetown, Gosnold, Halifax, Hanover, Hanson, Harwich, Hingham, Holbrook, Hull, Kingston, Lakeville, Mansfield, Marion, Marshfield, Mashpee, Mattapoisett, Middleborough, Nantucket, New Bedford, Norfolk, North Attleboro, Norton, Norwell, Norwood, Oak Bluffs, Orleans, Pembroke, Plainville, Plymouth, Plympton, Provincetown, Raynham, Rehoboth, Rochester, Rockland, Sandwich, Scituate, Seekonk, Sharon, Somerset, Stoughton, Swansea, Taunton, Tisbury, Truro, Walpole, Wareham, Wellfleet, West Bridgewater, West Tisbury, Westport, Whitman, Wrentham, Yarmouth.

=== District 6 ===
District 6 of the Highway Division covers the following cities and towns:

Boston, Braintree, Brookline, Cambridge, Canton, Chelsea, Dedham, Dover, Milton, Needham, Newton, Quincy, Randolph, Watertown, Wellesley, Weston, Westwood, Weymouth, Winthrop

== See also ==
- Transportation in Massachusetts
- State highways in Massachusetts
- Manual on Uniform Traffic Control Devices
- United States Department of Transportation
