= Slade's Ferry Bridge =

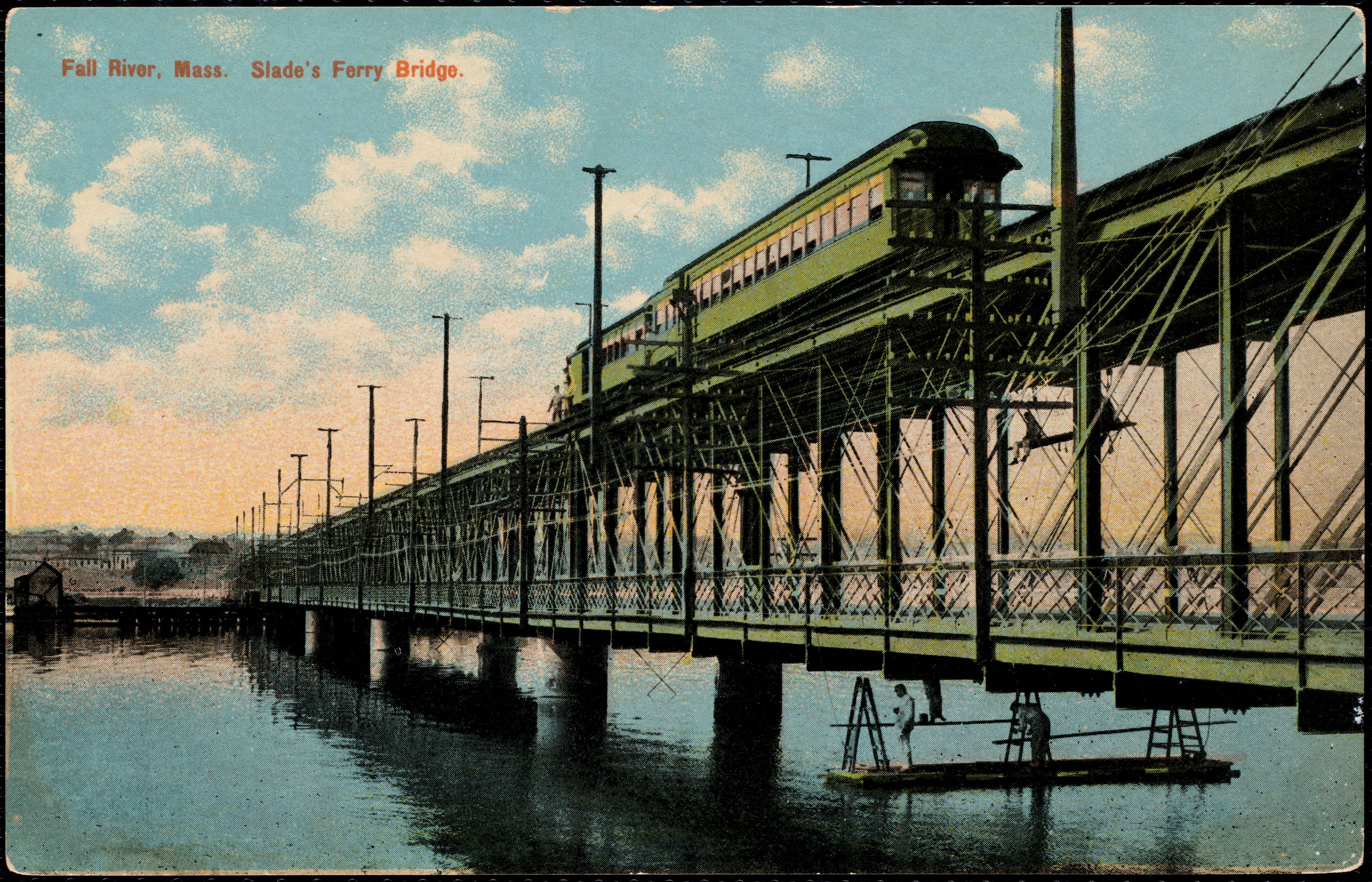
- The bridge on an early 20th century postcard
- Coordinates: 41°43′14.99″N 71°9′31.00″W
- Carries: vehicular and rail traffic
- Crosses: Taunton River
- Locale: Somerset to Fall River

History
- Opened: 1875
- Closed: 1970

The Slade's Ferry Bridge was a steel swing truss bridge that spanned the Taunton River between Somerset, Massachusetts and Fall River, Massachusetts. It was built in 1875 and removed in 1970. The bridge had two levels: an upper deck carrying the Providence, Warren and Bristol Railroad, and a lower deck for road traffic. A swing section (replaced by a bascule after a ship strike in 1932) allowed river traffic to pass. The alignment of the bridge carried it from Remington Street in Fall River to the junction of Riverside Avenue, Brayton Avenue and Wilbur Avenue in Somerset.
