= Taunton River =

River in Massachusetts, United States

Coordinates: 41.783°N 71.118°W

Taunton River Taunton Great River
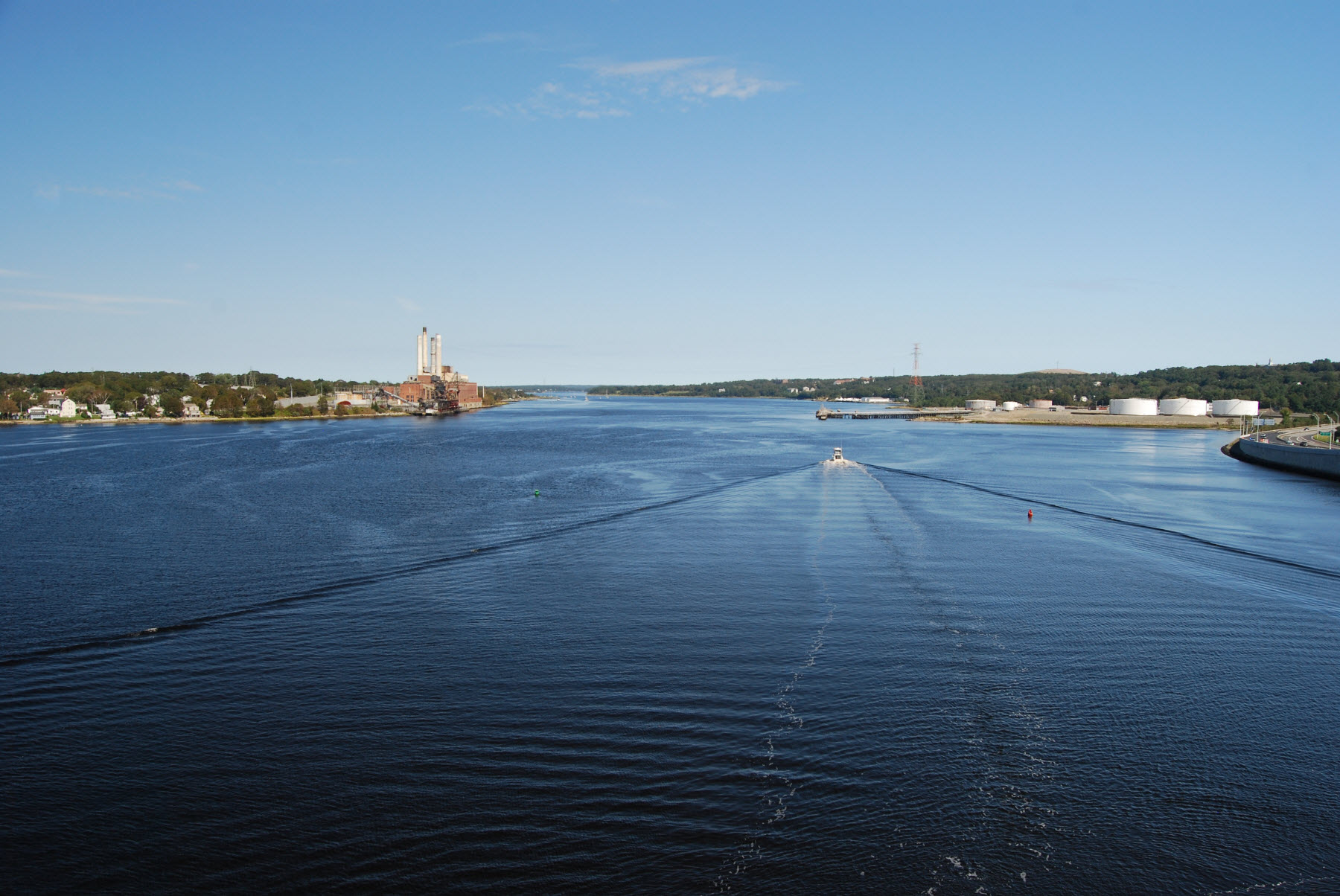
- Taunton River looking north from the Veterans Memorial Bridge

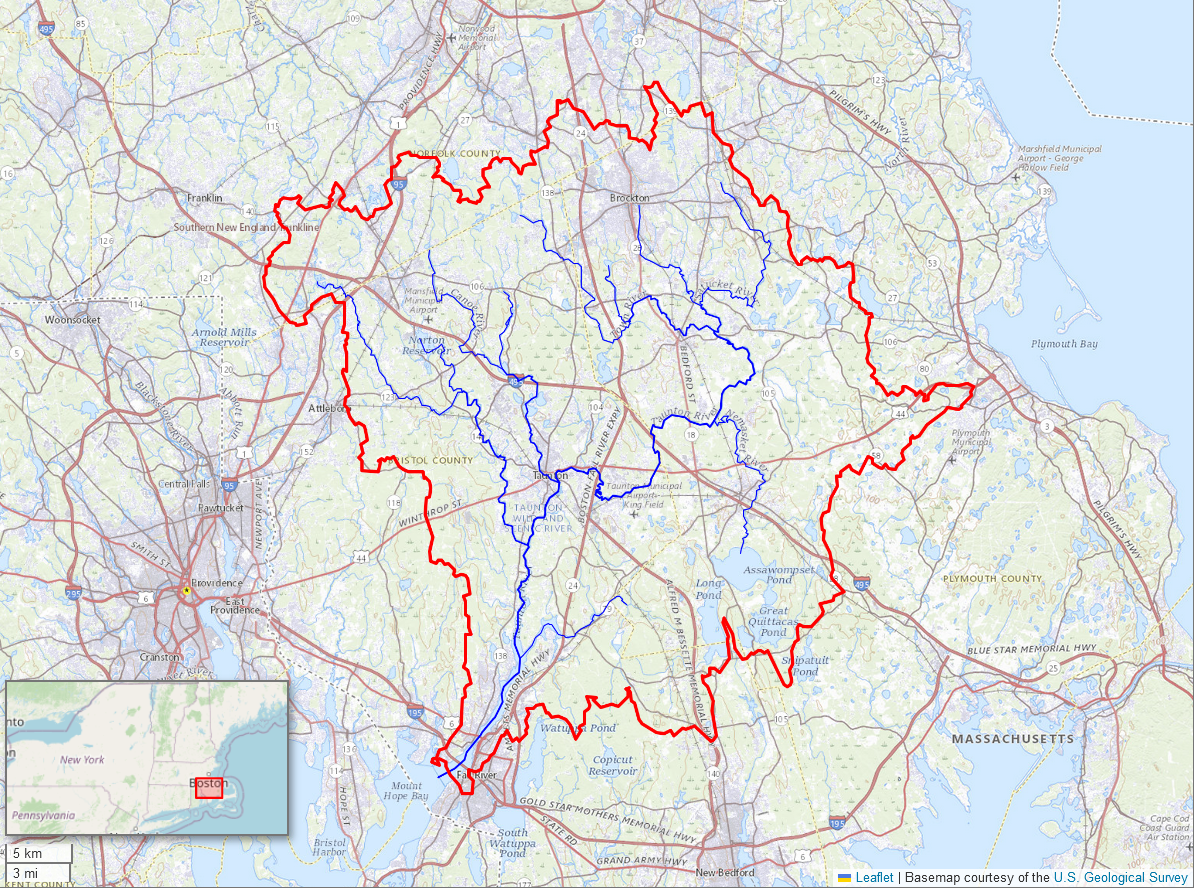
- Map of the Taunton River watershed

Location
- Country: United States
- State: Massachusetts
- Cities: Bridgewater, Taunton, Fall River

Physical characteristics
- Mouth: Mount Hope Bay
- Length: 36 mi (58 km)

National Wild and Scenic River
- Type: Scenic, Recreational
- Designated: March 30, 2009

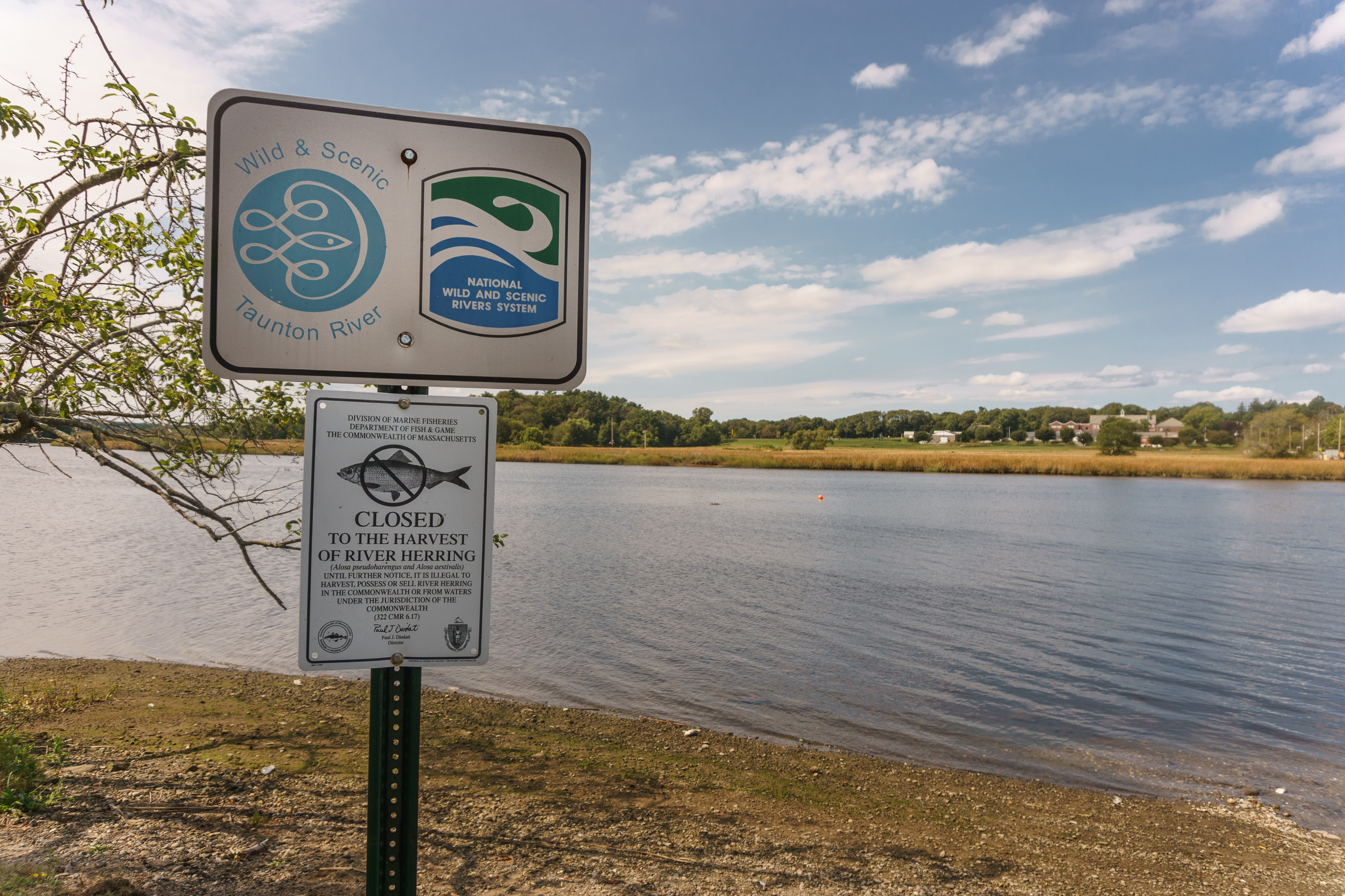
The Taunton River is a Wild and Scenic River.

The Taunton River, historically also called the Taunton Great River, is a river in southeastern Massachusetts in the United States. It arises from the confluence of the Town River and Matfield River, in the town of Bridgewater. From there it meanders through the towns of Halifax, Middleborough and Raynham, through the city of Taunton for which it is named, the towns of Berkley, Dighton, Somerset, and the Assonet section of Freetown, to Fall River where it joins Mount Hope Bay, an arm of Narragansett Bay.

== Description ==
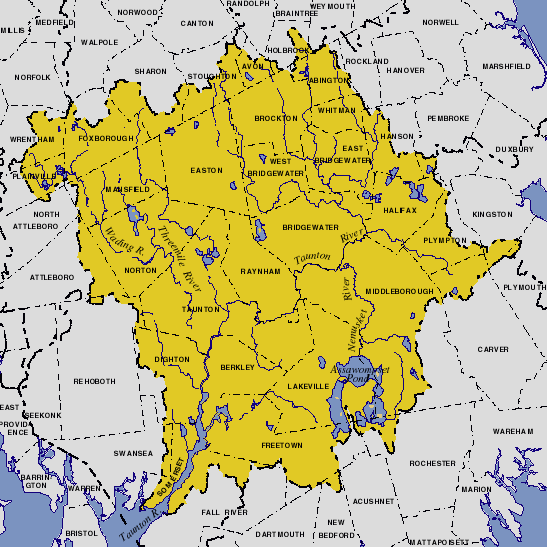
Map of the Taunton River watershed over county boundaries

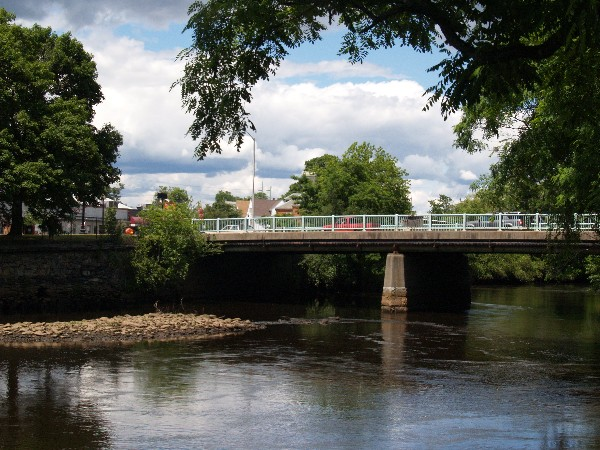
Taunton River at Weir Village, Taunton

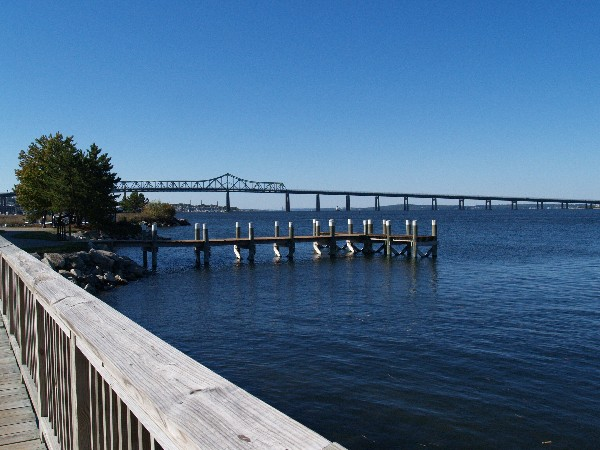
Taunton River at Fall River

The total length of the river is 37.0 miles (59.5 km) from the junction of the Town and Matfield Rivers in Bridgewater to the mouth of the Quequechan River in Fall River. It has a watershed of 562 square miles (1,460 km^{2}). The river's watershed includes the Hockomock Swamp, the largest freshwater wetland in the state. The Taunton River is one of the flattest rivers in New England, dropping only about twenty feet (6.1 m) in elevation over its length. The river is tidal as far north as Taunton.

The Taunton River is the longest coastal river in New England without dams, and is the principal river that makes up the Taunton River Watershed.

Battleship Cove, the world's largest museum of warships, is located on the Fall River side of the river at its confluence with Mount Hope Bay, beneath the Braga Bridge.

== Ecology ==
The river is home to much biodiversity, including some animals found nowhere else in the state. Over 154 bird species (including bald eagles) have been documented along the Taunton River, primarily during breeding season. The watershed supports 28 species of reptiles and amphibians, and 29 species of fish, including native brook trout and Atlantic sturgeon, which can be found in the lower part of the watershed. Some comprehensive surveys along the entire length of the river identified over 70 distinct species of fish. The Mystic Valley amphipod, which is native only to eastern New England, has been found in various wetlands throughout the watershed. River otters are common throughout the river, and harbor seals have been sighted in the watershed, as well as in some of the smaller tributaries, such as the Nemasket River. The watershed also is home to seven species of freshwater mussels, as well the largest herring run in New England. Other common wildlife within the watershed include river otter, mink, foxes and deer.

Due to its direct connection with the Atlantic ocean, the Taunton River and its tributaries are occasionally visited by marine species not normally found in rivers. In 2005, a young harp seal was found in the Nemasket. In early summer 2014, a young male beluga whale was sighted in the lower Taunton River, and in late August 2014, a basking shark was also spotted in the lower Taunton.

Over 360 plant species were sampled from the floodplain wetlands and the immediate river corridors, and various vegetative communities can be found along the river. These include Atlantic white cedar swamps, forested bogs, and coastal plain pondshores, among many others.

== History ==
Since the development of industry beginning with the iron works of the mid-17th century, the Taunton River has played an important role in the economy of the Greater Taunton Area. The shipbuilding industry was very active in the Taunton area during the 19th century.

After over five years of study for possible inclusion in the National Wild and Scenic River System, such designation was obtained in April 2009.

== Crossings ==
- List of crossings of the Taunton River

== Main tributaries ==
- Winnetuxet River, at Halifax
- Nemasket River, at Middleborough
- Mill River, at Taunton
- Three Mile River at Dighton
- Assonet River at Freetown

== See also ==
- Fall River, Massachusetts
- List of Massachusetts rivers
- Taunton, Massachusetts
- Three Mile River
- Weetamoo
