= Massachusetts Route 139 =

State highway in southeastern Massachusetts, US

Route 139
- Route 139 highlighted in red

Route information
- Maintained by MassDOT
- Length: 32.24 mi (51.89 km)

Major junctions
- West end: Route 27 / Route 138 in Stoughton
- Route 24 in Stoughton; Route 3 / Route 3A in Pembroke
- East end: Route 14 in Duxbury

Location
- Country: United States
- State: Massachusetts
- Counties: Norfolk, Plymouth

Highway system
- Massachusetts State Highway System; Interstate; US; State
← Route 138	→ Route 140

Route 139 is a 32.24-mile-long (51.89 km) west–east state highway in southeastern Massachusetts. Its western terminus is at Route 27 and Route 138 in Stoughton and its eastern terminus is at Route 14 in Duxbury. Along the way it intersects several major highways including Route 24 in Stoughton and Route 3 in Pembroke.

== Route description ==
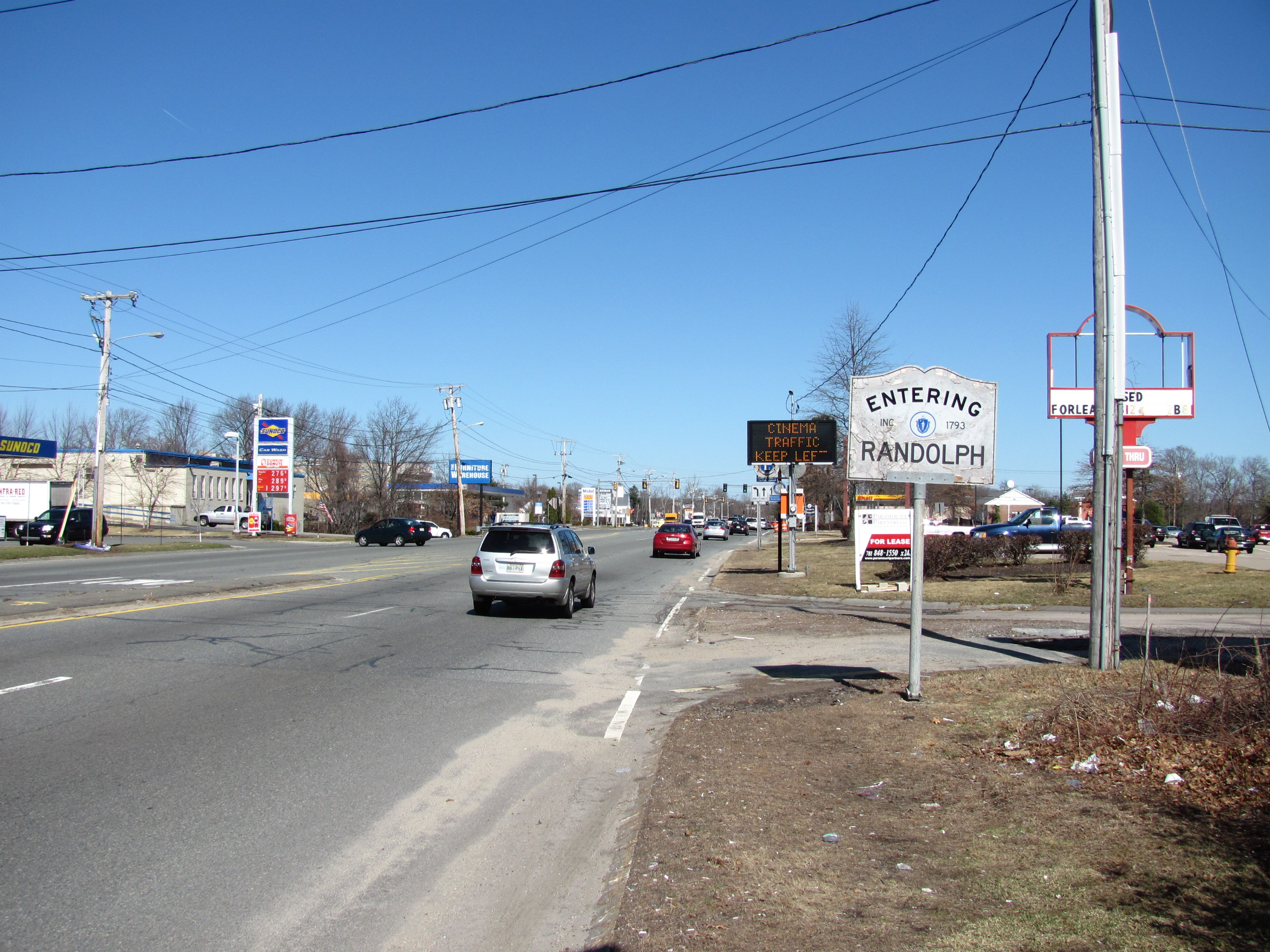
Route 139 entering Randolph eastbound

Route 139 begins in Stoughton Square at the southern junction of the Route 27 and 138 concurrency. The highway heads northeast until the junction with Route 24, at which point the highway heads almost due east. After the brief concurrency with Route 28 in Randolph, the highway heads in a generally east-southeasterly direction through Holbrook, the extreme southwest corner of Weymouth, the North Abington section of Abington, Rockland, Hanover, the northern edge of Pembroke, and Marshfield.

Once the highway reaches the shoreline in Marshfield, it turns in a south-southeasterly direction, passing through Fieldston, Ocean Bluff and Brant Rock, proceeding until just north of Brant Rock's esplanade. But then the highway heads west, while still signed east, for the last 4.5 miles (7.2 km), passing through Cedar Crest before ending at Route 14 in Duxbury.

== Major intersections ==
County	Location	mi	km	Destinations	Notes
Norfolk	Stoughton	0.00	0.00	Route 27 / Route 138 – Brockton, Whitman, Sharon, Walpole, Taunton, Canton	Western terminus; westbound Route 139 has access to Routes 27 and 138 northbound only
Norfolk	Stoughton	3.0	4.8	Route 24 – Fall River, Boston	Exit 38 on Route 24; cloverleaf interchange
Norfolk	Randolph	4.5	7.2	Route 28 north – Milton, Boston	Western end of Route 28 concurrency
Norfolk	Randolph	4.7	7.6	Route 28 south – Avon, Brockton	Eastern end of Route 28 concurrency
Norfolk	Holbrook	6.6	10.6	Route 37 – Boston, Brockton	
Plymouth	Abington	10.3	16.6	Route 18 – Whitman, New Bedford, Weymouth	
Plymouth	Abington	10.6	17.1	Route 58 – Abington, Wareham, Weymouth	
Plymouth	Rockland	12.2	19.6	Route 123 west – Brockton	Western end of Route 123 concurrency
Plymouth	Rockland	12.8	20.6	Route 123 east – Norwell, Scituate	Eastern end of Route 123 concurrency
Plymouth	Hanover	17.9	28.8	Route 53 north – Norwell	Northern terminus of Route 53 concurrency
Plymouth	Pembroke	19.0	30.6	Route 53 south – Kingston	Southern terminus of Route 53 concurrency
Plymouth	Pembroke	21.0	33.8	Route 3 – Boston, Cape Cod	Exit 27 on Route 3; partial cloverleaf interchange
Plymouth	Marshfield	23.7	38.1	Route 3A north – Scituate, Cohasset	Western terminus of Route 3A concurrency
Plymouth	Marshfield	24.2	38.9	Route 3A south – Duxbury, Plymouth	Eastern terminus of Route 3A concurrency
Plymouth	Duxbury	31.7	51.0	Route 3A – Marshfield, Boston, Duxbury, Plymouth	
Plymouth	Duxbury	32.24	51.89	Route 14 – Duxbury, Plymouth, Pembroke, Brockton	Eastern terminus; eastbound Route 139 has access to Route 14 westbound only
1.000 mi = 1.609 km; 1.000 km = 0.621 mi: Incomplete access
