= Massachusetts Route 53 =

Highway in Massachusetts

Route 53
- Route 53 highlighted in red

Route information
- Maintained by MassDOT
- Length: 22.138 mi (35.628 km)
- Existed: 1963–present

Major junctions
- South end: Route 3A in Kingston
- Route 14 in Pembroke; Route 3 in Hanover
- North end: Route 3A in Quincy

Location
- Country: United States
- State: Massachusetts
- Counties: Plymouth, Norfolk

Highway system
- Massachusetts State Highway System; Interstate; US; State
← Route 52	→ Route 56

Route 53 is a 22.138-mile-long (35.628 km) south–north state highway in southeastern Massachusetts. Its southern terminus is at Route 3A in Kingston and its northern terminus is at Route 3A in Quincy. Along the way it intersects Route 3 in Hanover.

== History ==
Route 53 follows the former routing of the Kingston to Quincy section of Route 3 which was moved onto the Southeast Expressway and Pilgrim's Highway expressway when they were fully completed in 1963. The remaining former sections of Route 3 became extensions of Route 3A.

For a period of time, from at least the early 1930s through 1967, a mile of what is now Route 53, between Derby Street and Main Street (Route 228), was also coextensive with Route 128. In 1967 that route was cut back to the Braintree Split, and again in 1997 it was officially cut back to the I-95/I-93 junction in Canton.

=== Queen Anne's Corner ===
The intersection of Route 53 with Route 228 on the Hingham–Norwell town line is known as Queen Anne's Corner or historically Queen Ann's Corner and the nearby section of Route 53 has also been known as Queen Anne's (or Ann's) Turnpike. The name comes from Anne Whiton, a local tavern owner who in the mid-1700s, along with her daughters, had an "unsavory reputation" and was called quean with the archaic meaning of the word as prostitute.

== Route description ==
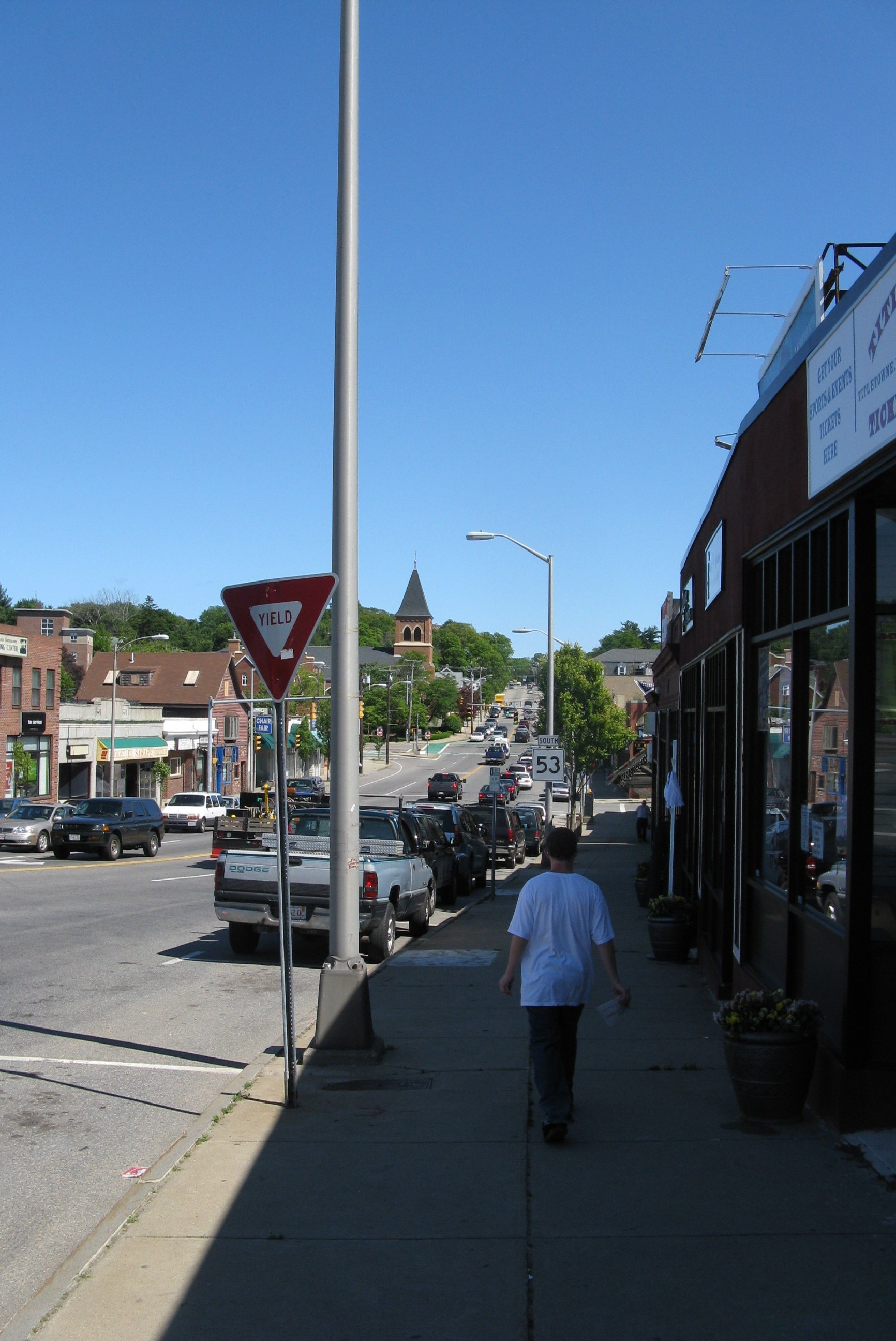
Southbound in Weymouth Landing

Route 53 begins in Kingston at Route 3A, just a third of a mile west of where that route meets Route 3 at Exit 10. It heads north, almost immediately entering the town of Duxbury. It passes through the southwestern part of that town before meeting Route 14 just over the line into Pembroke. The two routes pass concurrently for over a mile and a half before splitting in the area of North Pembroke. Route 53 is alone for just over a mile and a quarter before becoming concurrent with Route 139. The two routes pass over the North River into Hanover together before splitting.

Route 53 heads northwards through the eastern part of Hanover until it passes the Hanover Mall and meets Route 3 once more, at Exit 13. From Route 3 it bends northwestward, going through the western portion of Norwell before meeting Route 228 just over the town line into Hingham. The route passes through the southwest corner of that town before entering Weymouth. In Weymouth, the route bisects the town from southeast to northwest, passing Whitman's Pond and the northern end of Route 18. Route 53 then enters Braintree, crossing the Monatiquot River before entering Quincy, passing the site of the Fore River Shipyard. After just a mile, Route 53 ends at Route 3A, with that route resuming the former route of Route 3.

== Major intersections ==
County	Location	mi	km	Destinations	Notes
Plymouth	Kingston	0.0	0.0	Route 3A to Route 3 – South Duxbury, Kingston Ctr.	Southern terminus; To Route 106, Route 80, Route 27 and US 44
Plymouth	Pembroke	4.6	7.4	Route 14 east – Duxbury, Green Harbor, East Pembroke	Southern terminus of Route 14 concurrency
Plymouth	Pembroke	6.3	10.1	Route 14 west to Route 36 – Pembroke Center, Hanson, Hobomock Pond	Northern terminus of Route 14 concurrency
Plymouth	Pembroke	7.6	12.2	Route 139 east – Marshfield, Brant Rock	Southern terminus of Route 139 concurrency
Plymouth	Hanover	8.7	14.0	Route 139 west – Hanover Center, Brockton	Northern terminus of Route 139 concurrency
Plymouth	Hanover	11.6	18.7	Route 3 – Plymouth, Cape Cod, Braintree, Boston	Exit 32 on Route 3; partial cloverleaf interchange
Plymouth	Hanover	12.2	19.6	Route 123 – Norwell, Scituate, Rockland	
Plymouth	Hingham	14.4	23.2	Route 228 – South Hingham, Hull, Rockland	Queen Anne's Corner, just north of the Norwell town line
Norfolk	Weymouth	18.8	30.3	Route 18 south – Abington, Bridgewater	Northern terminus of Route 18
Norfolk	Quincy	22.14	35.63	Route 3A – Hingham, Nantasket, Neponset	Northern terminus
1.000 mi = 1.609 km; 1.000 km = 0.621 mi: Concurrency terminus
