= Massachusetts Route 14 =

State highway in Plymouth County, Massachusetts, US

Route 14
- Route 14 highlighted in red

Route information
- Maintained by MassDOT
- Length: 18.46 mi (29.71 km)
- Existed: 1933, 1936 (current alignment)–present

Major junctions
- West end: Route 27 in Brockton
- Route 3 in Duxbury
- East end: Route 3A in Duxbury

Location
- Country: United States
- State: Massachusetts
- Counties: Plymouth

Highway system
- Massachusetts State Highway System; Interstate; US; State
← Route 13	→ Route 15

Route 14 is a 18.46-mile-long (29.71 km) state highway in southeastern Massachusetts. It runs from Route 27 in Brockton east to Route 3A in Duxbury, near the coastline.

Route 3 (Pilgrims Highway) has an interchange with Route 14, at Exit 22 (formerly exit 11) in Duxbury.

== Route description ==
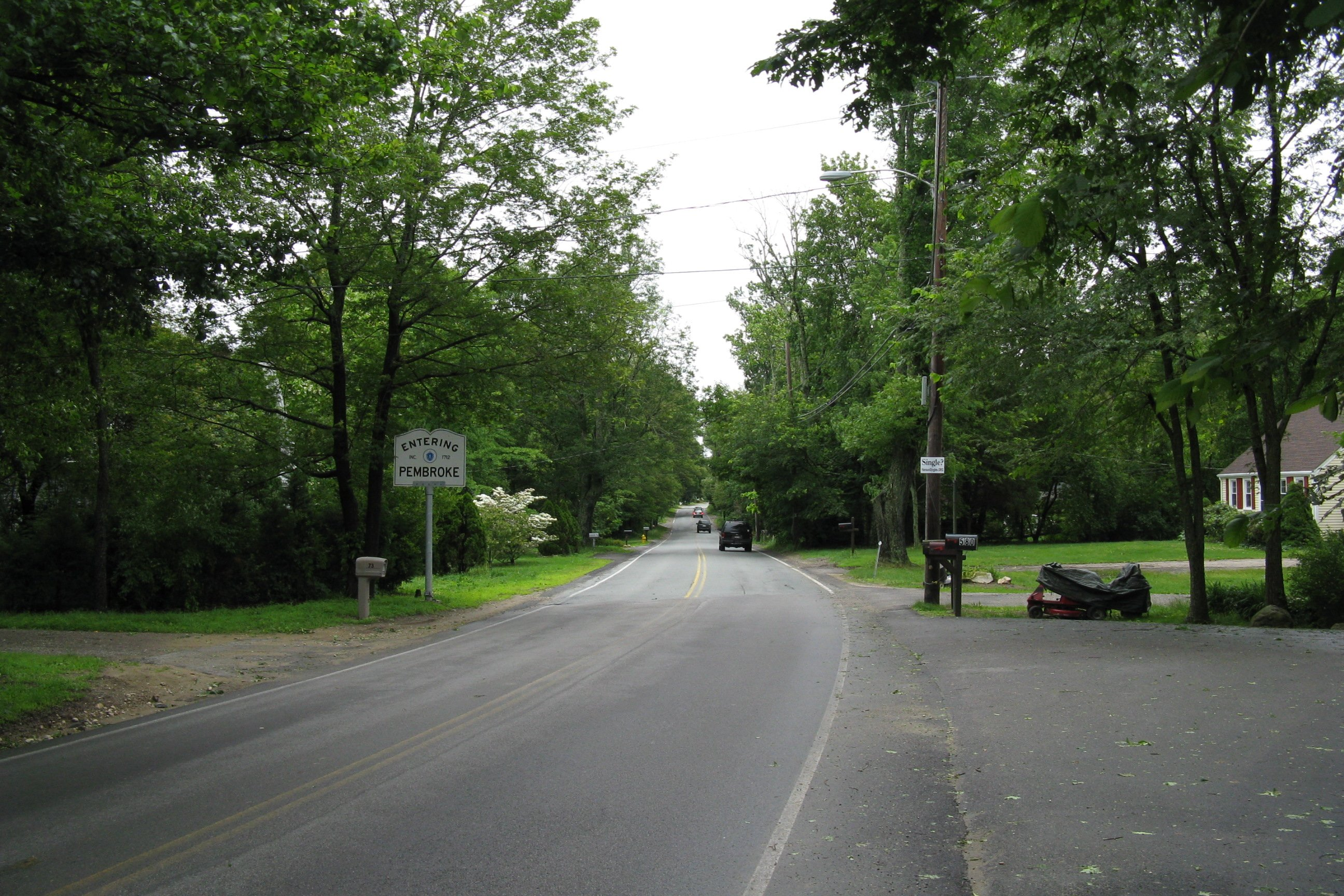
Eastbound entering Pembroke

From its western terminus at Route 27 in Brockton, Route 14 goes through Whitman south of the center of the town before going the northeastern corner of East Bridgewater, crossing Route 27 once more. In Hanson, the road is concurrent with Route 58 through the center of town, past Wampatuck Pond. It passes into Pembroke between Oldham Pond and Furnace Pond before passing through the center of town. After another concurrency with Route 53, the road passes into Duxbury, crossing Route 3 before ending at Route 3A west of Duxbury Village.

== History ==
In 1933, Route 14 was extremely short, with its western terminus at Route 3 (current Route 53). By 1936 it had been extended out to its current routing in Brockton.

== Major intersections ==
The entire route is in Plymouth County.

Location	mi	km	Destinations	Notes
Brockton	0.00	0.00	Route 27 to Route 28 / Route 123 – Brockton, Stoughton, Whitman	Western terminus
Whitman	2.00	3.22	Route 18 – East Bridgewater, Middleboro, Abington, Boston	
East Bridgewater	4.70	7.56	Route 27 – South Hanson, Kingston, Whitman	
Hanson	6.90	11.10	Route 58 north – Whitman	Western terminus of concurrency with Route 58
Hanson	7.30	11.75	Route 58 south – Halifax	Eastern terminus of concurrency with Route 58
Pembroke	10.30	16.58	Route 36 south – Halifax, Plympton	Northern terminus of Route 36
Pembroke	12.10	19.47	Route 53 north – Boston	Western terminus of concurrency with Route 53
Pembroke	13.80	22.21	Route 53 south – Kingston	Eastern terminus of concurrency with Route 53
Duxbury	16.40	26.39	Route 3 (Pilgrims Highway) – Plymouth, Cape Cod, Quincy, Boston	Exit 22 on Route 3; partial cloverleaf interchange
Duxbury	17.30	27.84	Route 139 west – Green Harbor, Fieldston, Duxbury Beach	Eastern terminus of Route 139
Duxbury	18.46	29.71	Route 3A – Marshfield, Boston, Kingston, Plymouth	Eastern terminus
1.000 mi = 1.609 km; 1.000 km = 0.621 mi: Concurrency terminus
