= Massachusetts Route 3 =

Highway in Massachusetts

Route 3
- Route 3 highlighted in red

Route information
- Maintained by MassDOT
- Length: 55.7059 mi (89.6500 km)
- Existed: 1926–present

Major junctions
- South end: US 6 in Bourne
- US 44 in Plymouth; I-93 / US 1 / Route 37 from Braintree to Boston; I-90 / Mass Pike in Boston
- North end: US 3 / Route 2A in Cambridge

Location
- Country: United States
- State: Massachusetts
- Counties: Barnstable; Plymouth; Norfolk; Suffolk; Middlesex

Highway system
- Massachusetts State Highway System; Interstate; US; State
← US 3	→ Route 3A

Route 3 is a state-numbered route in the U.S. state of Massachusetts, maintained by the Massachusetts Department of Transportation (MassDOT). Spanning approximately 56 miles (90 km) along a north–south axis, it is inventoried with U.S. Route 3 (US 3) as a single route by the state. The state-numbered Route 3 travels from Bourne in the south to Cambridge in the north, while US 3 continues from Cambridge and crosses the New Hampshire state line in Tyngsborough. Mileposts on US 3 continue from those on the state-numbered Route 3.

Route 3 begins in the south as a freeway along a brief overlap with U.S. Route 6 (US 6) in Bourne. The highway is known as the Pilgrims Highway from Bourne to the Braintree Split at the Braintree–Quincy city line, where Route 3 meets with Interstate 93 (I-93) and U.S. Route 1 (US 1) and the three routes travel concurrently toward Boston as the Southeast Expressway. I-93, US 1, and Route 3 travel through the Central Artery and the O'Neill Tunnel in Downtown Boston, after which point Route 3 exits the concurrency and continues on surface streets. It crosses the Longfellow Bridge on the Boston–Cambridge city line, and transitions into US 3 shortly after an intersection with Route 2A in Cambridge.

== Route description ==
Massachusetts Route 3 can be said to have three segments: the Pilgrims Highway, the concurrency with Interstate 93, and the section north of I-93 in Boston.

=== Pilgrims Highway (Bourne – Braintree) ===
The Pilgrims Highway is the part of Route 3 that stretches from the intersection with US 6 in Bourne to the junction with Interstate 93 in Braintree. The route is entirely a freeway and ranges from four lanes further south to six further north. Between the towns of Pembroke and Hingham, the highway is typically composed of four lanes, but is expanded to five during rush hour. During this time, travel is authorized in the breakdown lane of the peak direction. This portion of the route stretches for approximately 43 miles.

=== Concurrency with Interstate 93 (Braintree – Boston) ===
Route 3 runs concurrently with Interstate 93 and U.S. Route 1 from Exit 7 in Braintree to Exit 18 in Boston. Along this portion of the route, it is known as the Southeast Expressway and is composed of eight lanes. Outside of rush hour, four lanes travel in each direction. However during rush hour, a high-occupancy vehicle lane (HOV) zipper lane is added to the peak direction of travel, making five lanes flow in the peak direction and three in the other. After the interchange with the Massachusetts Turnpike, just before the route enters the Tip O'Neill Tunnel in Downtown Boston, it is reduced to six lanes. The Southeast Expressway segment of Route 3 is approximately 10 miles long.

=== Northern end (Boston – Cambridge) ===
While in Downtown Boston, Route 3 is concurrent with I-93 and US-1. Route 3 exits I-93 at Exit 18, and runs concurrently with Storrow Drive for a short way to the Longfellow Bridge, where it crosses over to Cambridge and joins Memorial Drive. On Memorial Drive, at an interchange with Route 2A, the designation of the highway changes to U.S. Route 3, which continues through Boston's northern suburbs and toward New Hampshire.

== History ==

Route 3 began as a new designation for New England Highway 6 in 1927 when the U.S. Highway system was created and New England highway Route 3 was chosen to be US 6. The former NE 6 then took the route 3 number with U.S. Route 3 designated north of its intersection with U.S. Route 1 and Massachusetts Route 3 to the south. The route was basically a connected system of two-lane roadways up until the 1950s with the exception of Route 3's original path through Boston which paired it with US 1 on Park Drive, the Riverway and the Jamaicaway and then along its own path in Mattapan and Dorchester along the Arborway, Morton Street and Gallivan Boulevard.

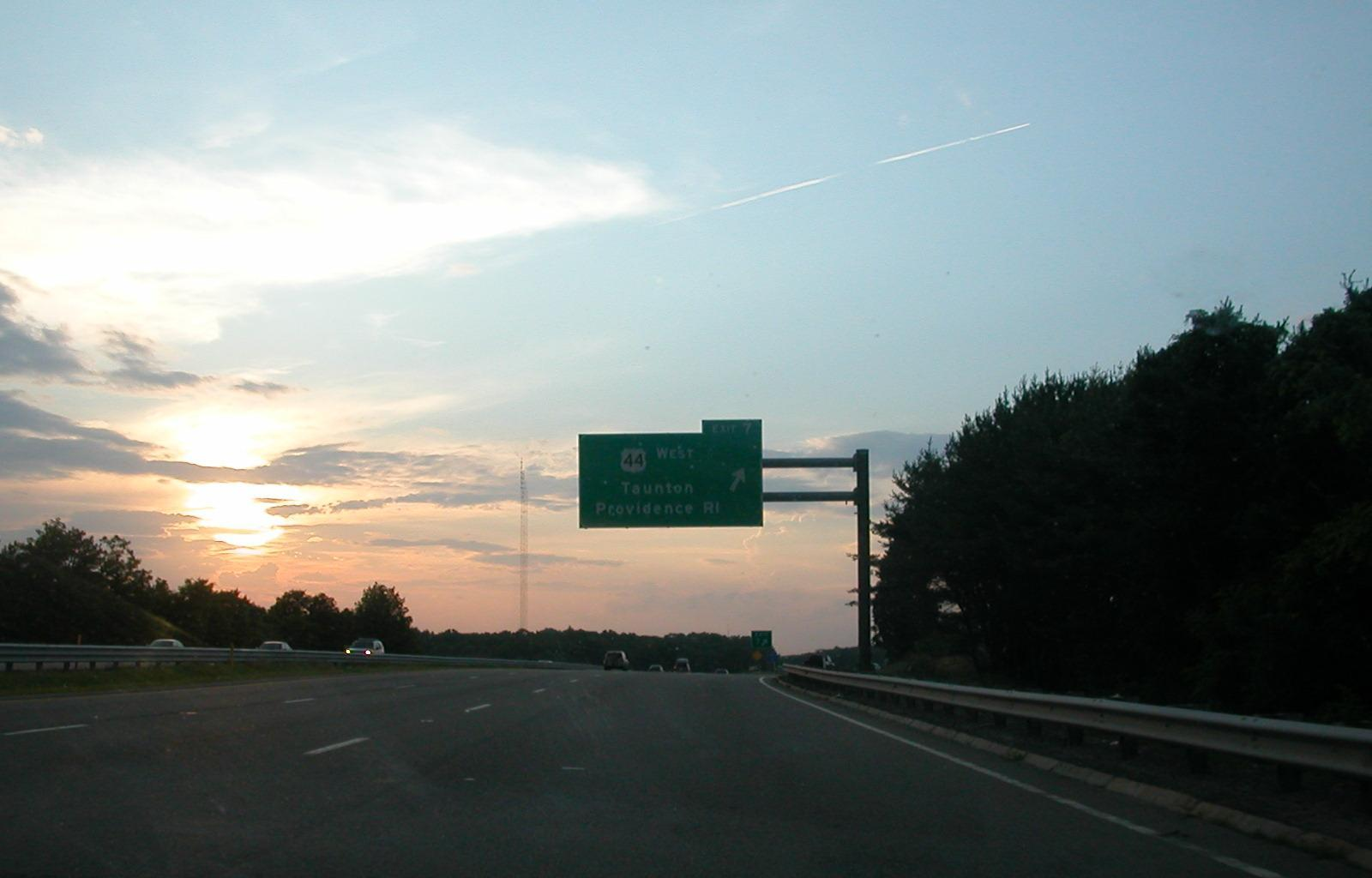
A portion of the Pilgrims Highway in Plymouth

Before the road was rerouted, the road continued over the Cape Cod Canal via the Sagamore Bridge to the Bourne Rotary, to the south of the Bourne Bridge. This arrangement changed after 1951.

The Plimoth Patuxet Highway, a two-lane divided freeway that connects Route 3 with Route 3A, was once signed as Route 3 before the southernmost portion of the freeway to Cape Cod was finished.

The first section of the Pilgrims Highway was built as a bypass of Plymouth in the early 1950s. The mid-1950s saw an extension of this bypass route south to the Sagamore Bridge and north to Kingston. The northern section of the highway was built next with a connection from Derby Street in Hingham to the Southeast Expressway opening in 1959. Finally the last sections between Hingham and Duxbury were completed by 1963 when the Route 3 designation was moved onto the completed freeway. The former Route 3 highways became Route 3A in Quincy and from Kingston south, the remainder became Route 53. Route 3 was connected to the Southeast Expressway in Milton by using Granite Avenue as a link from Gallivan Boulevard. Until around 1965, the northern portion of the Pilgrims Highway, from current Exit 36 (Derby Street) in Hingham, was also signed as Route 128, which continued past the exit on surface streets to Hull. However, by 1966 the 128 designation was removed past its intersection with Route 3 in Braintree (and thus from the Pilgrims Highway entirely) and the surface portion became Massachusetts Route 228. Route 3 was then taken off its remaining pathway along surface streets in Boston and extended up the Southeast Expressway and Central Artery in 1971 to the Storrow Drive exit. The routing of Route 3 has changed little since that time.

A re-signing project from 2006 to 2009 changed exit 20 to exit 20A for I-93 south and exit 20B for I-93 north. In the process, the ramp carrying Route 3 to I-93 north was no longer signed as part of Route 3. Separate signs indicating Route 3's routing along I-93 were to be installed on exit sign support poles in 2011.

== Future ==
=== Potential road-widening project ===
MassDOT is looking into the possibility, in a similar manner to what happened to a 14+ mile section of Route 128 in the 2010s, of widening Route 3 from I-93 to the Sagamore Bridge from four to six lanes (as has already been done within the US 44 road concurrency between exits 15 and 16 near Plymouth) with new bridges and new on- and off-ramps, and will include upgraded interchanges with new acceleration and deceleration lanes. The project is expected to cost $256 million.

== Major intersections ==
Route 3 was one of the freeways whose exits were once numbered with the "25 is 128" system, in which the Braintree Split was numbered "Exit 25" (due to it being the exit for Route 128), with numbers increasing away from Boston and decreasing toward Boston. Under the old system, the Sagamore Rotary was (on paper) "Exit 43." When the first 22 miles (35 km) of the highway were resurfaced in 1975-76, the new numbers were instituted in that section. The Braintree section wasn't resurfaced in 1978, leaving a two-year gap when half the highway was on the new system while the other half was on the old system. During that time, the exit to Route 14 was "Exit 11" northbound and "Exit 33" southbound. Exit numbers on Route 3 were to be changed to those based on highway mileposts under a MassDOT project due to start in 2016, but this project was postponed. On November 18, 2019, MassDOT confirmed that, beginning in late summer 2020, the exit renumbering project will begin.

The exit renumbering was done between December 1–14, 2020. to Route 58

County	Location	mi	km	Old exit	New exit	Destinations	Notes
Barnstable	Bourne	0.0	0.0			US 6 east (Sagamore Bridge) to Route 6A east – Sagamore, Hyannis, Provincetown	Continuation east; southern end of US 6 concurrency
Barnstable	Bourne	0.3	0.48		1A	US 6 west to Route 28 / Route 25 / I-195 / I-495 / Meetinghouse Lane – Buzzards Bay, Falmouth	Northern end of US 6 concurrency; signed as exits 1A (Meetinghouse) and 1B (US 6) northbound; Meetinghouse Lane signed as Scusset Beach Road
Plymouth	Plymouth	2.5	4.0	2	3	Route 3A north (Herring Pond Road) – Cedarville, Manomet	Southern terminus of Route 3A
Plymouth	Plymouth	7.1	11.4	3	7	Clark Road / Beaver Dam Road – Pine Hills	
Plymouth	Plymouth	12.3	19.8	4	12	Plimoth Patuxet Highway east – Manomet	Southbound left exit and northbound entrance
Plymouth	Plymouth	12.7	20.4	5	13	Long Pond Road / South Street – Plymouth Center	Access to Beth Israel Deaconess Hospital – Plymouth
Plymouth	Plymouth	14.5	23.3	6	15	US 44 east (Samoset Street) – Plymouth Center, Carver	Southern end of US 44 concurrency; signed as exits 15A (east) and 15B (west) southbound
Plymouth	Plymouth	15.6	25.1	7	16	US 44 west – Taunton, Providence, RI	Northern end of US 44 concurrency
Plymouth	Kingston	16.9	27.2	8	17	Smith Lane – Rocky Nook	To Independence Mall Way
Plymouth	Kingston	17.8	28.6	9	18	Route 3A – Kingston, North Plymouth	To Routes 80, 106, and 27
Plymouth	Duxbury	19.4	31.2	10	20	Route 3A to Route 53 – Kingston, South Duxbury	
Plymouth	Duxbury	22.3	35.9	11	22	Route 14 – Duxbury, Pembroke	
Plymouth	Pembroke	26.9	43.3	12	27	Route 139 – Marshfield, Hanover	
Plymouth	Hanover	31.7	51.0	13	32	Route 53 / Route 123 – Hanover, Norwell	To Hanover Mall Drive; former southern end of freeway before 1963
Plymouth	Rockland	34.3	55.2	14	35	Route 228 north – Hingham, Rockland	Southern terminus of Route 228
Plymouth	Hingham	36.1	58.1	15	36	Derby Street – Hingham, Weymouth	Signage for Route 53 was removed in 2009
Norfolk	Weymouth	38.1	61.3	16	38	Route 18 – Weymouth, Abington	Signed as exits 38A (north) and 38B (south) southbound
Norfolk	Braintree	40.5	65.2	17	40	Union Street – Braintree, South Braintree	
Norfolk	Braintree	42.7	68.7	18	41	Washington Street – Braintree	Southbound exit and northbound entrance
Norfolk	Braintree	42.0– 42.4	67.6– 68.2	19	42	Burgin Parkway – Quincy Center, Quincy Adams Station	
Norfolk	Braintree	42.6	68.6	20	43 (NB); 7 (SB)	I-93 south / US 1 south / Route 37 to I-95 – Canton, Quincy, Braintree	Southern end of I-93 / US 1 concurrency; US 1 not signed northbound; former Route 128
See I-93 exits 7-18
Suffolk	Boston	53.5	86.1	26	18	I-93 north / US 1 north – Boston	Northern end of I-93 / US 1 concurrency
Suffolk	Boston	53.5	86.1	Northern end of freeway section			
Suffolk	Boston	54.1	87.1			Route 28 north – Leverett Circle	Southern end of Route 28 concurrency; northbound interchange; southbound at-grade intersection
Suffolk	Boston	54.4	87.5			Route 2 west / Route 28 south (Storrow Drive)	Interchange; northern end of Route 28 concurrency
Suffolk	Boston	54.6	87.9			Cambridge Street – Government Center, Massachusetts General Hospital	
Charles River				Longfellow Bridge			
Middlesex	Cambridge	55.0	88.5			Main Street – Kendall Square	Interchange
Middlesex	Cambridge	55.3	89.0			Land Boulevard to Expressways – Charlestown	Interchange; southbound exit and northbound entrance
Middlesex	Cambridge	55.7	89.6			Route 2A (Massachusetts Avenue / Harvard Bridge) – Cambridge, Roxbury	Diamond interchange; no southbound access to Route 2A west
Middlesex	Cambridge	55.7	89.6			US 3 north (Memorial Drive) – Arlington, Winchester	Continuation north
1.000 mi = 1.609 km; 1.000 km = 0.621 mi: Concurrency terminus; Incomplete access
