= Massachusetts Route 58 =

North-south state highway in Massachusetts, US

Route 58
- Route 58 highlighted in red

Route information
- Maintained by MassDOT
- Length: 29.86 mi (48.06 km)

Major junctions
- South end: Route 28 on the Rochester–Wareham town line
- I-495 in Wareham; US 44 in Carver
- North end: Route 18 in Weymouth

Location
- Country: United States
- State: Massachusetts
- Counties: Plymouth, Norfolk

Highway system
- Massachusetts State Highway System; Interstate; US; State
← Route 57	→ Route 60

Route 58 is a 29.86-mile-long (48.06 km) south–north state highway in southeastern Massachusetts. For all but its final 0.4 miles (0.64 km), the route lies within Plymouth County. Its southern terminus is at Route 28 at the Rochester–Wareham town line and its northern terminus is at Route 18 in Weymouth. Along the way it intersect several major highways including Interstate 495 (I-495) in Wareham and U.S. Route 44 (US 44) in Carver.

== Route description ==
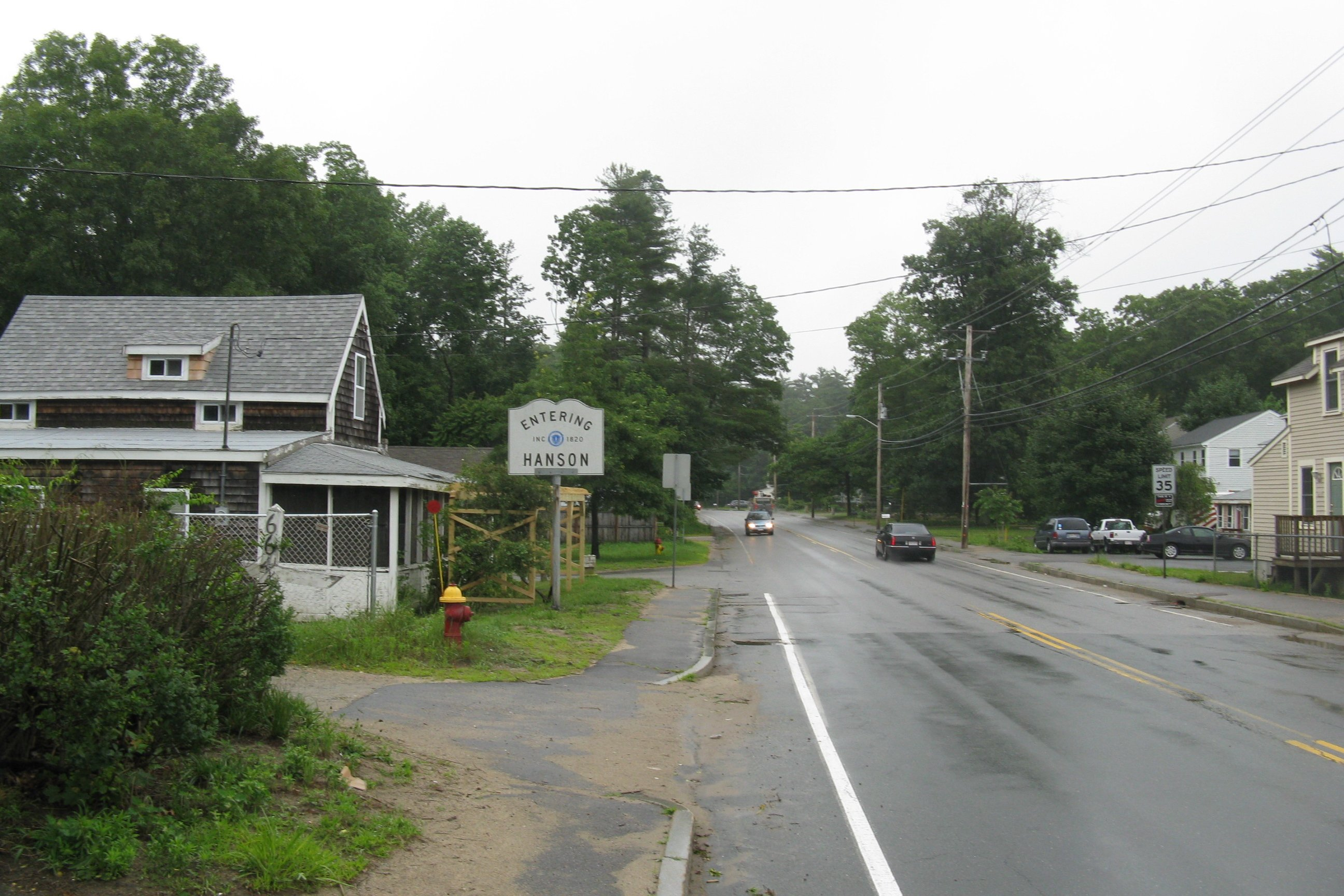
Northbound entering Hanson

Route 58 begins at Route 28 on the Rochester–Wareham town line. The route follows the town line for approximately a tenth of a mile before being wholly in Wareham. It then crosses I-495 before clipping the corner of Middleborough and re-entering Wareham for a short while before finally entering Carver. For the first 1.4 miles (2.3 km) of this route, none of the town line changes are signed.

The route turns northward through the town of Carver, passing Edaville Railroad and the King Richard's Faire grounds as well as the center of town. In North Carver the town intersects U.S. Route 44 just west of where that route becomes a four-lane freeway. Before the freeway was completed, the route had a short concurrency between its current exit ramps to Plymouth Road, where the route continued eastward to Plymouth. Route 58 then passes through the small town of Plympton and into Halifax, where it intersects Route 106. It then passes between the East and West Monponsett Ponds before crossing into Hanson.

In Hanson, Route 58 intersects Route 27 before sharing a 0.4 miles (0.64 km) concurrency with Route 14, passing the Town Hall and Wampatuck Pond before splitting northwestward. The route takes a few turns before entering Whitman, turning northward at a rotary into the town of Abington. It intersects Route 123, the Plymouth Branch, and Route 139, all before ending just over the Weymouth town line at Route 18, just west of the former South Weymouth Naval Air Station site.

== Route history ==
When first established in the late 1920s, Route 58 went from Wareham to Canton ending at Route 138. In Abington, instead of heading straight at the intersection with Route 123, the route went right, running concurrent along Centre Avenue until Spring Street where it turned left and crossed into Weymouth on Union Street. Route 58 then followed what would be the 1931-1959 routing of Route 128 through Weymouth (Columbian Street), Braintree (Columbian Street, Grove Street, Franklin Street, and West Street), Quincy (Blue Hill River Road), Milton (Blue Hill River Road, Hillside Street) and Canton (Royall Street) before ending at Route 138. In 1931, with the establishment of the new path of Route 128 from Dedham to Hingham, Route 58 was truncated back to Main Street in Weymouth continuing its modern path north of Route 123 to end at what is today the intersection with Route 18.

== Major intersections ==
County	Location	mi	km	Destinations	Notes
Plymouth	Rochester	0.0	0.0	Route 28 / County Road – West Wareham, Wareham, Middleboro, Rochester	Southern terminus
Plymouth	Wareham	0.4	0.64	I-495 – Taunton, Marlboro, Cape Cod	Exit 2 on I-495; partial cloverleaf interchange
Plymouth	Carver	10.3	16.6	US 44 – Plymouth, Middleboro, Taunton	Diamond interchange
Plymouth	Halifax	15.8	25.4	Route 106 – Kingston, Bridgewater	
Plymouth	Hanson	19.4	31.2	Route 27 – Bryantville, Plymouth, Cape Cod	
Plymouth	Hanson	21.0	33.8	Route 14 east – Pembroke, Duxbury	Southern terminus of Route 14 concurrency
Plymouth	Hanson	21.4	34.4	Route 14 west – Brockton, Easton	Northern terminus of Route 14 concurrency
Plymouth	Abington	26.6	42.8	Route 123 – Brockton, Rockland, Scituate	
Plymouth	Abington	28.0	45.1	Route 139 – Holbrook, Rockland, Marshfield	
Norfolk	Weymouth	29.86	48.06	Route 18 to Route 3 – Bridgewater, South Weymouth, Quincy	Northern terminus
1.000 mi = 1.609 km; 1.000 km = 0.621 mi: Concurrency terminus
