= Massachusetts Route 80 =

State highway in Plymouth County, Massachusetts, US

Route 80
- Route 80 highlighted in red

Route information
- Maintained by MassDOT
- Length: 6.56 mi (10.56 km)
- Existed: by 1953–present

Major junctions
- West end: Carver Road in Plymouth
- East end: Route 3A in Kingston

Location
- Country: United States
- State: Massachusetts
- Counties: Plymouth

Highway system
- Massachusetts State Highway System; Interstate; US; State
← Route 79	→ Route 81

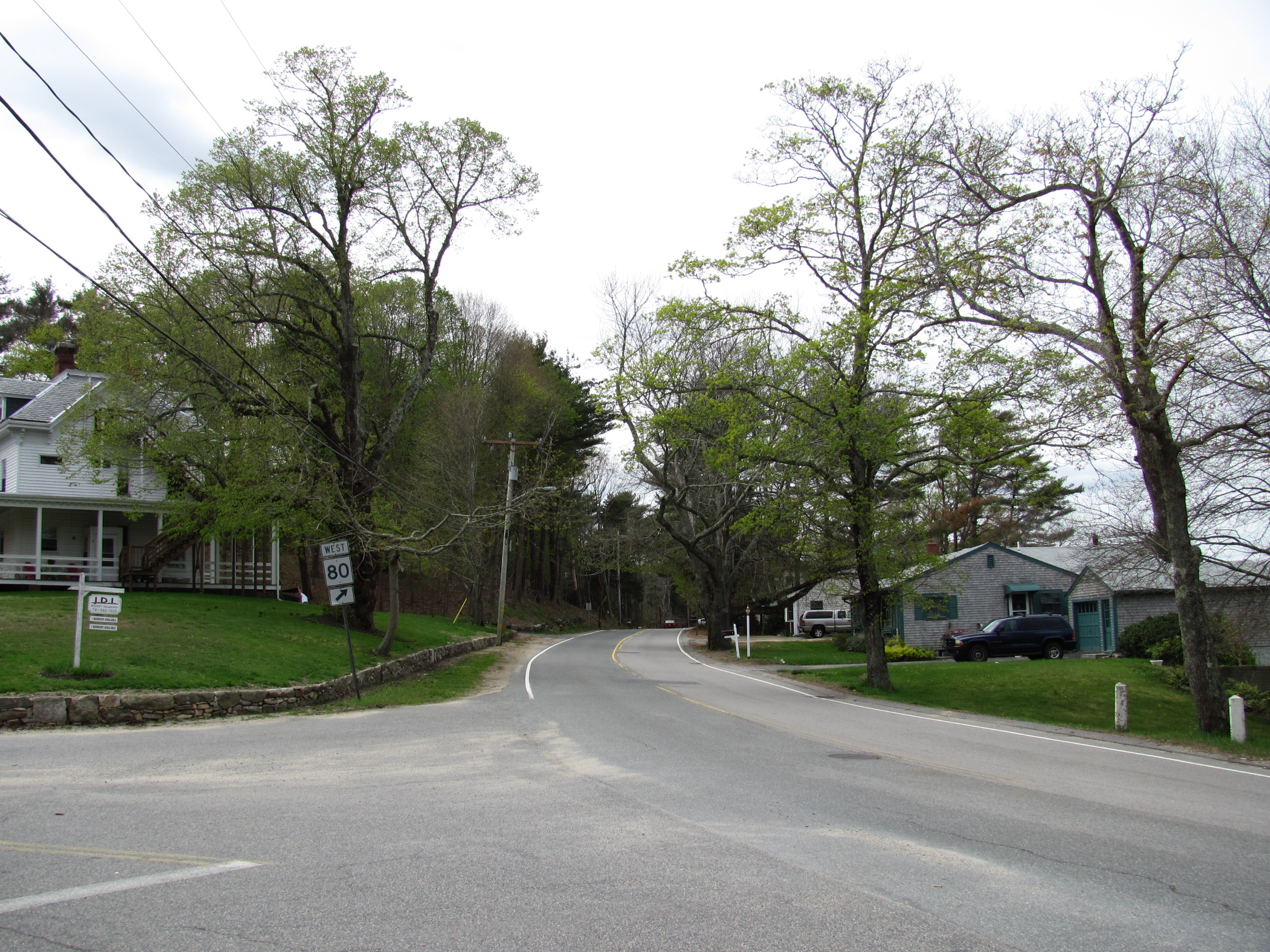
Westbound in Kingston

Route 80 is a 6.56-mile-long (10.56 km) C-shaped state highway in southeastern Massachusetts. The highway is signed as west–east.

== Route description ==
Route 80 starts at Carver Road (formerly U.S. Route 44) in the West Plymouth section of Plymouth. Due to the realignment of Route 44 in 2005, this is an unusual instance, that a numbered route does not have its terminus with another numbered route. Though signed East, Route 80 heads west in the Plymouth section, and then generally north and northwest after crossing the town line into Kingston, all for the first 4.1 miles (6.6 km), and is a state highway, before finally turning east at Elm Street and becoming a town-maintained road.

The highway crosses over the new highway portion of U.S. Route 44 in Kingston, but there is no interchange; however, Commerce Way in Plymouth provides access between the two highways. Route 80 ends at Route 3A in Kingston along the Jones River between Routes 3 and 106.

The state highway portion of the road is also concurrent with the Claire Saltonstall Bikeway which runs for 135 miles between Boston and Cape Cod.

=== Points of interest ===
Parting Ways Cemetery, a 94-acre (380,000 m^{2}) site containing the burial grounds of four former slaves who fought in the American Revolutionary War and their families, is on this highway in Plymouth, near the Kingston town line.

Sacred Heart School and Camp Mishannock, a summer camp for girls along Lake Providence, are on the Kingston portion of this highway.

== Major intersections ==
The entire route is in Plymouth County.

Location	mi	km	Destinations	Notes
Plymouth	0.0	0.0	Carver Road	Western terminus; former routing of US 44
Plymouth	0.6	0.97	Commerce Way	To US 44
Kingston	4.1	6.6	Elm Street – Plympton	To Route 58
Kingston	6.56	10.56	Route 3A – Plymouth, Kingston, Boston	Eastern terminus; to Route 3, Route 53, Route 106 and Route 27
1.000 mi = 1.609 km; 1.000 km = 0.621 mi
