= Quincy Point Fire Station =

- U.S. National Register of Historic Places
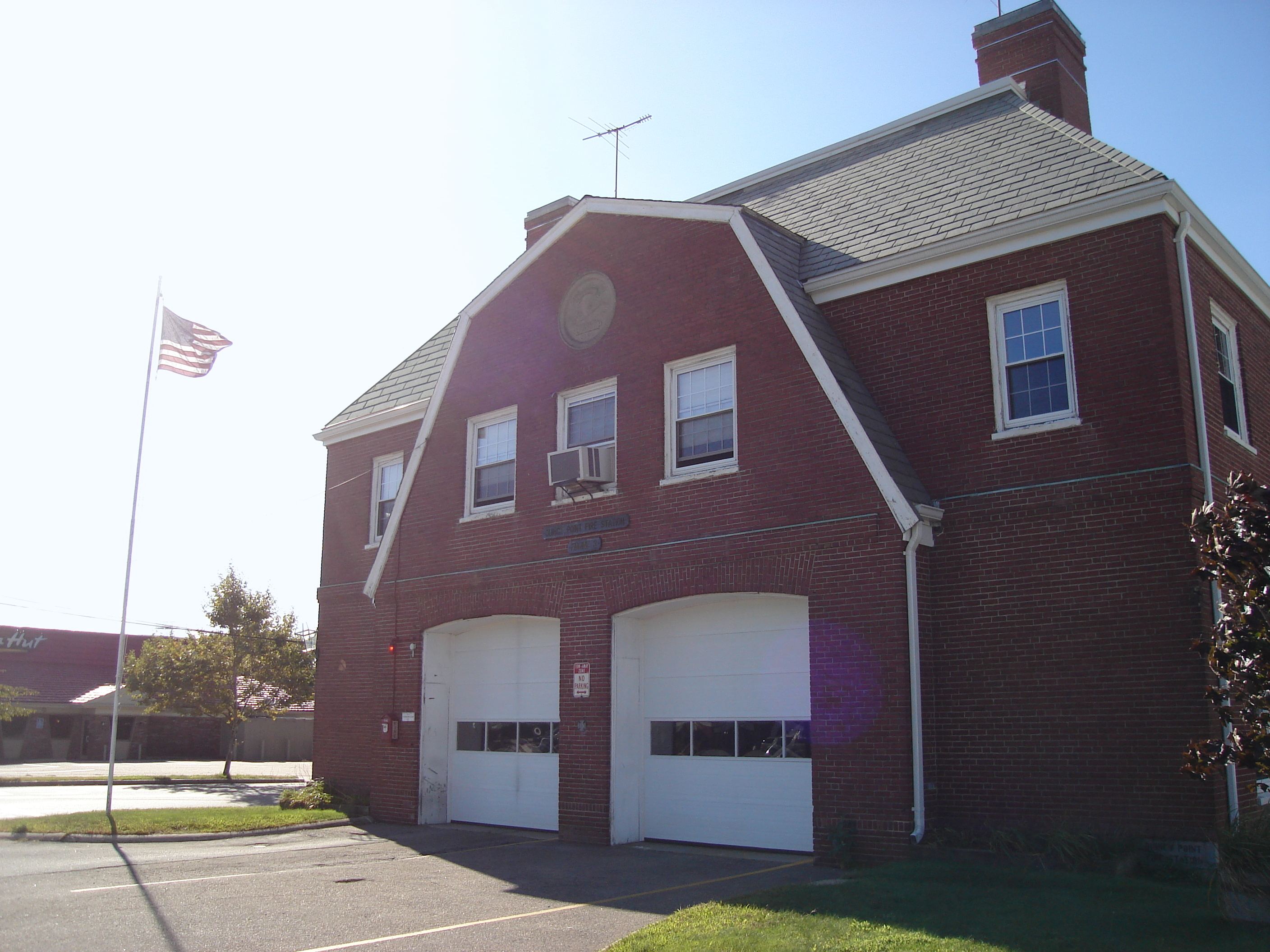

- Location within Massachusetts Location within the United States
- Location: 615 Washington St., Quincy, Massachusetts
- Coordinates: 42°14′46.5″N 70°58′35.0″W
- Built: 1941
- Architect: Robinson, George Earnest
- Architectural style: Colonial Revival
- NRHP reference No.: 93000347
- Added to NRHP: February 18, 1994

Quincy Point Fire Station is a historic fire station at 615 Washington Street in Quincy, Massachusetts. Built in 1941, it is the third firehouse to occupy the location, and is one of the city's finest examples of Colonial Revival architecture. It was listed on the National Register of Historic Places in 1994.

== Description and history ==
The Quincy Point Fire Station is set at the southwest corner of Washington Street (Massachusetts Route 3A) and Cleverly Court, in northeastern Quincy. It is a two-story brick structure, with a T-shaped layout. It is topped by a truncated hip roof, and has a central gambrel-gabled section projecting slightly to the front. This section houses the entrances to the two vehicle bays, and has three sash windows at the second level; there are single sash windows flanking it on either side. The city seal is near the peak of the gable. The interior of building has a spare modern look that is a marked contrast to the exterior Colonial Revival styling.

The first station built at Quincy Point was a Greek Revival wood-frame structure erected in 1844; this was replaced in 1893 by a Shingle style building that included a tall tower for drying hoses. The current building was constructed in 1941 to a design by George E. Robinson, a Boston architect with a known reputation for his firehouse designs. His design lacked the then-typical hose drying tower, opting instead for drying facilities (eventually supplemented by a heating system to speed the process) in the basement. (Modern fire hoses no longer need to be dried after use.)

== See also ==
- National Register of Historic Places listings in Quincy, Massachusetts
