= Massachusetts Route 3A =

State highway in eastern Massachusetts, US

Route 3A
- Route 3A highlighted in red

Route information
- Maintained by MassDOT
- Length: 97 mi (156 km)
- Existed: 1926–present

Southern segment
- Length: 53.392 mi (85.926 km)
- South end: Route 3 in Plymouth
- Major intersections: US 44 in Plymouth; Route 53 in Kingston; Route 53 in Quincy
- North end: I-93 / US 1 / Route 3 / Route 203 in Boston

Northern segment
- Length: 22.5043 mi (36.2172 km)
- South end: US 3 / I-95 / Route 128 in Burlington
- Major intersections: Lowell Connector in Lowell; Route 110 in Lowell; Route 113 in Tyngsborough
- North end: NH 3A at the New Hampshire state line in Tyngsborough

Location
- Country: United States
- State: Massachusetts
- Counties: Plymouth, Norfolk, Suffolk, Middlesex

Highway system
- Massachusetts State Highway System; Interstate; US; State
← Route 3	→ Route 3B
← Route 6	N.E.	→ Route 7

Route 3A is a 97-mile-long (156 km) state highway in eastern Massachusetts, which parallels Route 3 and U.S. Route 3 (US 3) from Cedarville in southern Plymouth to Tyngsborough at the New Hampshire state line.

Route 3A has two major posted segments, separated by a lengthy concurrency with Route 3 and US 3. Its southern portion parallels Route 3 from Cedarville in southern Plymouth to Neponset in the Dorchester area of Boston. Towns and cities that Route 3A traverse along its path include Plymouth, Kingston, Duxbury, Marshfield, Scituate, Cohasset, Hingham, Weymouth and Quincy.

North of Neponset, Route 3A runs, unsigned, concurrently with Route 3 and US 3 to Burlington, before separating again (MassDOT counts the mileage along Route 3 and US 3 between the two sections as part of MA 3A mileage).

The northern portion of Route 3A parallels U.S. Route 3 in northwestern Middlesex County. It stretches from Interstate 95 (I-95) in Burlington to the New Hampshire state line, where it continues as New Hampshire Route 3A.

== Route description ==
=== Plymouth to Boston ===
This segment parallels Route 3 from Cedarville in southern Plymouth to Neponset in the Dorchester area of Boston. Towns and cities that Route 3A traverse along its path include Plymouth, Kingston, Duxbury, Marshfield, Scituate, Cohasset, Hingham, Weymouth and Quincy.

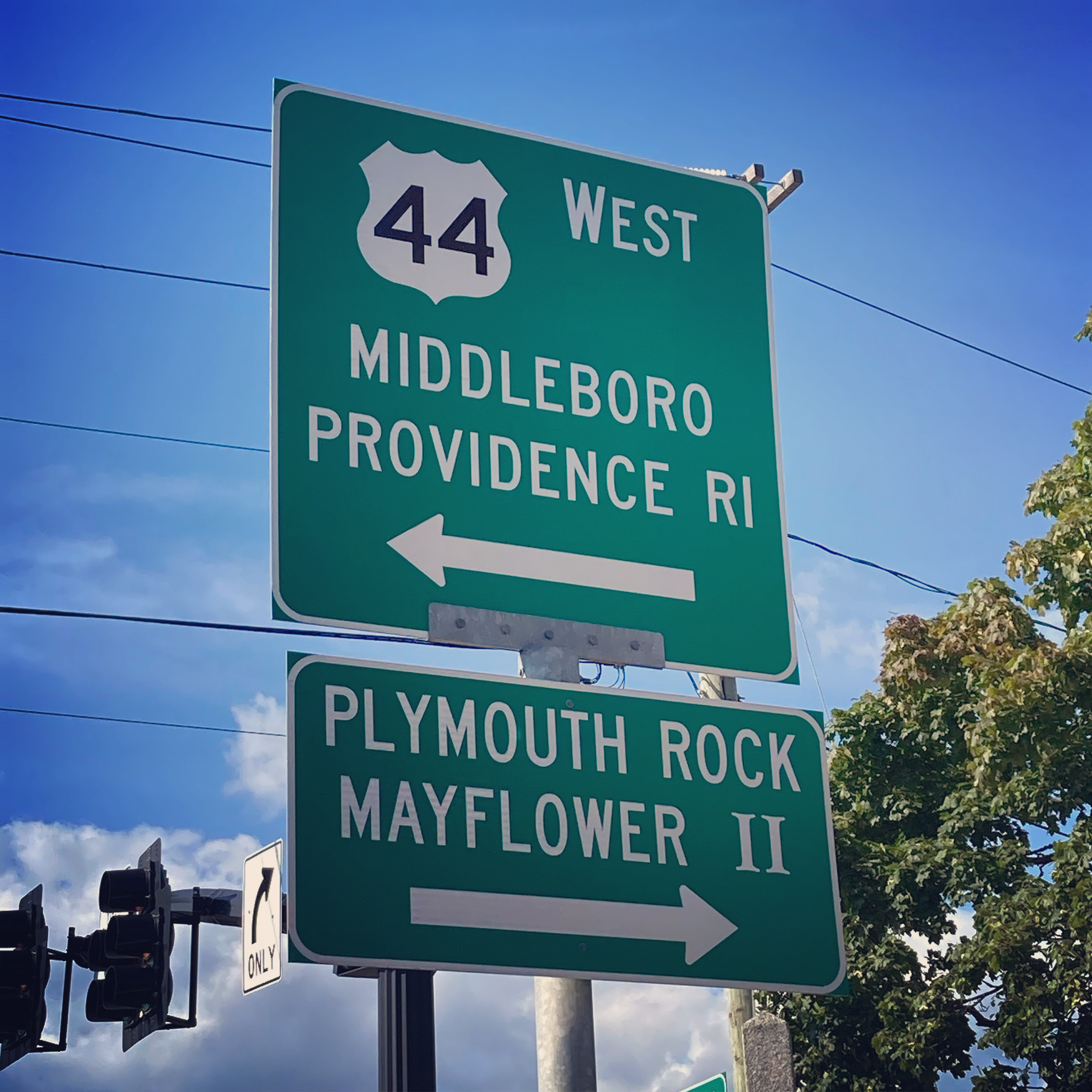
Eastern terminus of US 44 along 3A

The Claire Saltonstall Bikeway between Boston and Cape Cod twice intersects Route 3A. Once in the Cedarville portion of Plymouth where Route 3A begins, and again about 14 miles later in historic downtown Plymouth between South and Market Streets along Sandwich Street.

=== Boston to Burlington ===
This segment is concurrent with Route 3 (to Cambridge) and then U.S. Route 3 (from Cambridge to Burlington). As an 'A' route concurrent with its parents, this segment is not posted.

=== Burlington to Tyngsborough ===
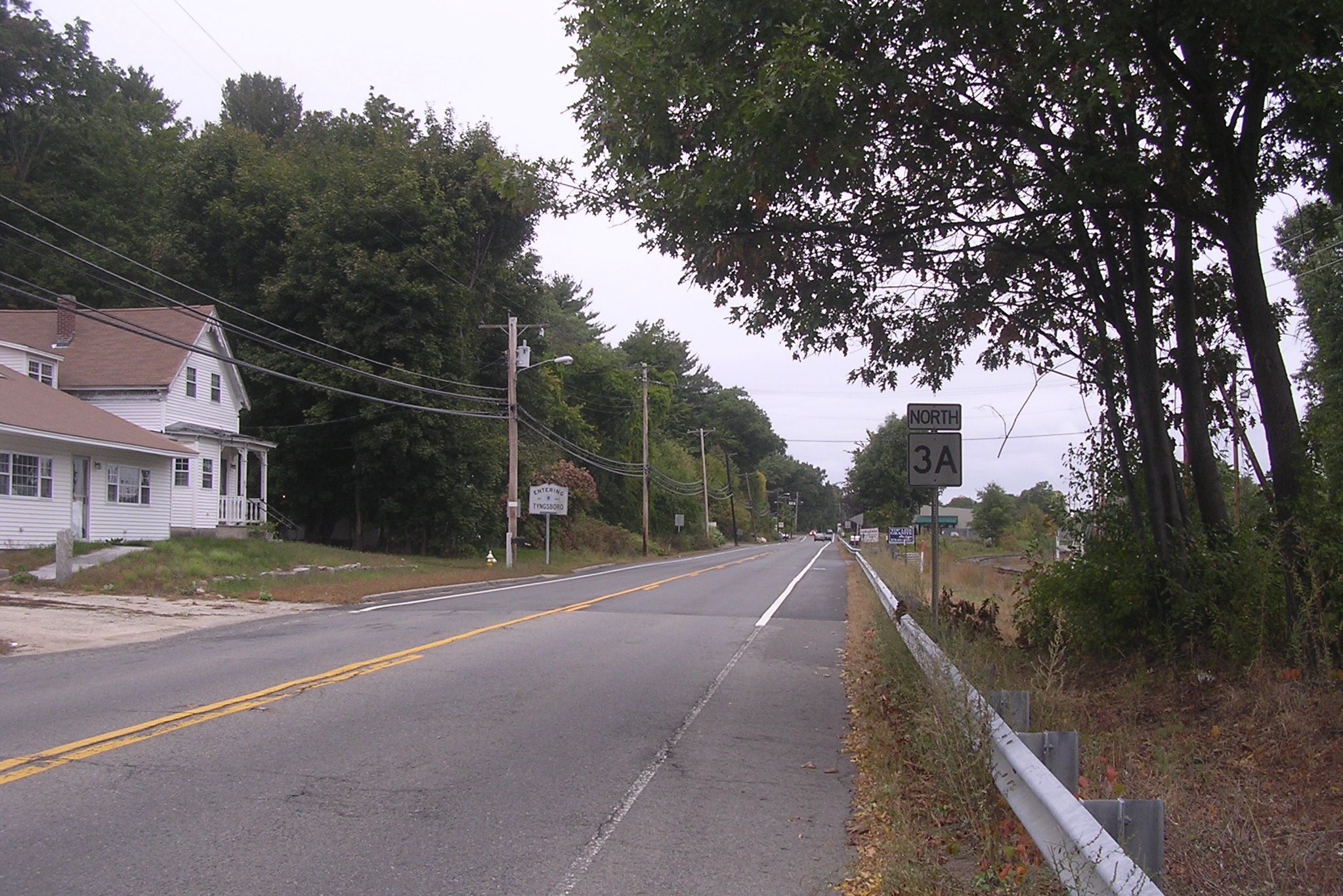
Northbound 3A entering Tyngsborough

This segment parallels US 3 from I-95 in Burlington to the New Hampshire state line, where it continues as New Hampshire Route 3A. The part south of Route 113 in Tyngsborough is former US 3.

== History ==

From 1922 to 1926, Route 3A between Kingston and Quincy was New England Interstate Route 6A. In 1926, when New England Interstate Route 6 became Route 3, Route 6A became Route 3A.

In the 1930s Route 3A's route was shifted onto new alignments built to reduce traffic problems in several communities through which the highway traversed. This included a bypass of Hingham Square along Broad Cove Road and Otis Street along Hingham Harbor replacing the original route that took it down Lincoln Street to downtown Hingham then along North Street to Summer Street. Chief Justice Cushing Highway was built around the same time and Route 3A was put on this highway from south of the Hingham Harbor rotary through Cohasset to Scituate. This replaced a routing along long-existing roadways such as Country Way in Scituate, South and North Main Streets in Cohasset and East Street to Summer Street in Hingham. Along East Street from Hull Street to Summer, Route 3A shared the highway with Route 128 in the late 1920s and early 1930s.

In the 1950s and early 1960s Route 3A was extended to take over the original path of Route 3 south of Kingston to Plymouth and north of downtown Quincy to Neponset when Route 3 assumed its current freeway route. In between those locations, old Route 3 was designated Route 53. The section of old Route 3 from Cedarville south to the Sagamore Rotary near the Cape Cod Canal in Bourne is unnumbered.

Much of Route 3A is sometimes referred to as the "Cape Way" due to its history as the only major road to Cape Cod from Boston prior to the opening of Route 3. The "Cape Way" name is reflected in numerous business names along 3A's length.

The section of Route 3A south of the intersection with Route 113 in Tyngsborough (all but the northern few miles of the route) was formerly U.S. Route 3, prior to the construction of the Northwest Expressway, a freeway connection from I-95 in Burlington to the Everett Turnpike in Nashua, New Hampshire, which was given the U.S. Route 3 designation.

== Major intersections ==
County	Location	mi	km	Destinations	Notes
Plymouth	Plymouth	0.00	0.00	Route 3 to US 6 / Route 6A – Boston, Cape Cod	Southern terminus; exit 3 on Route 3
Plymouth	Plymouth			State Road – Scusset Beach	
Plymouth	Plymouth	11.40	18.35	Plimoth Patuxet Highway west to Route 3 – Boston	Southern terminus of Plimoth Patuxet Highway
Plymouth	Plymouth	15.00	24.14	US 44 west – Middleborough, Providence	Eastern terminus of US 44
Plymouth	Kingston	18.30	29.45	Route 3 – Plymouth, Cape Cod, Duxbury, Boston	Exit 18 on Route 3
Plymouth	Kingston	18.70	30.09	Route 80 west to Route 58 – Plympton, Middleborough	Eastern terminus of Route 80
Plymouth	Kingston	18.90	30.42	Route 106 west to Route 27 – Halifax, East Bridgewater, Whitman	Eastern terminus of Route 106
Plymouth	Kingston	20.30	32.67	Route 53 north – Pembroke, Hanover	Southern terminus of Route 53
Plymouth	Duxbury	20.60	33.15	Route 3 – Plymouth, Cape Cod, Quincy, Boston	Exit 20 on Route 3
Plymouth	Duxbury	24.20	38.95	Route 14 west – Pembroke, Boston	Eastern terminus of Route 14
Plymouth	Duxbury	25.00	40.23	Route 139 to Route 14 – Green Harbor, Brant Rock	
Plymouth	Marshfield	27.70	44.58	Route 139 east – Fieldston	Southern end of Route 139 concurrency
Plymouth	Marshfield	28.10	45.22	Route 139 west to Route 3	Northern end of Route 139 concurrency
Plymouth	Scituate	34.50	55.52	Route 123 west – Norwell, Brockton	Roundabout; eastern terminus of Route 123
Plymouth	Hingham	42.20	67.91	Route 228 – Nantasket, Hull, South Hingham	
Norfolk	Quincy	49.00	78.86	Route 53 south to Route 18 – Weymouth	Northern terminus of Route 53
Norfolk	Quincy			Quincy Shore Drive south – Squantum, Wollaston Beach	Interchange; southbound exit and northbound entrance
Neponset River				Bridge	
Suffolk	Boston	53.60	86.26	Route 203 west (Gallivan Boulevard) – Ashmont	Eastern terminus of Route 203
Suffolk	Boston	53.61	86.28	I-93 south / US 1 south / Route 3 south	Northern terminus
see Route 3/US 3
Middlesex	Burlington	74.8	120.4	US 3 / I-95 / Route 128 – Waltham, Lowell, Peabody, Portsmouth, NH	Southern terminus; exits 51A-B on I-95
Middlesex	Burlington	77.20	124.24	Route 62 east – Wilmington, North Reading	Southern end of Route 62 concurrency
Middlesex	Burlington	77.80	125.21	Route 62 west – Bedford, Concord	Northern end of Route 62 concurrency
Middlesex	Billerica	82.40	132.61	Route 129 east – Reading, Wakefield	Southern end of Route 129 concurrency
Middlesex	Billerica	83.60	134.54	Route 129 west to US 3 – Chelmsford, Westford	Northern end of Route 129 concurrency, To Route 4, Route 110 and Route 27
Middlesex	Lowell	87.30	140.50	Lowell Connector south to I-495 / US 3	Exits 5A-B on Lowell Connector
Middlesex	Lowell	87.70	141.14	Route 110 east / Thorndike Street – Dracut, Lawrence	Southern end of Route 110 concurrency
Middlesex	Lowell	87.90	141.46	Route 110 west – Chelmsford, Worcester	Northern end of Route 110 concurrency
Middlesex	Chelmsford	91.10	146.61	Route 4 south to US 3 – Burlington	Northern terminus of Route 4
Middlesex	Chelmsford	91.80	147.74	Route 40 west – Groton	Eastern terminus of Route 40
Middlesex	Tyngsborough	95.10	153.05	Route 113 west – Dunstable	Southern end of Route 113 concurrency
Middlesex	Tyngsborough			Tyngsborough Bridge over the Merrimack River	
Middlesex	Tyngsborough	95.30	153.37	Route 113 east – Lowell	Northern end of Route 113 concurrency
Middlesex	Tyngsborough	97.00	156.11	NH 3A north – Hudson	Continuation into New Hampshire
1.000 mi = 1.609 km; 1.000 km = 0.621 mi: Concurrency terminus; Incomplete access
