= Muddy Pond (Kingston, Massachusetts) =

Lake of the United States of America

- Lake Providence
- Location within Massachusetts Location within the United States
- Location: Kingston, Massachusetts
- Coordinates: 41°57′24″N 70°44′20″W
- Basin countries: United States
- Surface area: 37 acres (15 ha)

Muddy Pond, also known as Lake Providence or Nun's Pond, is a 37-acre (150,000 m^{2}) pond in Kingston, Massachusetts, located east of Route 80 and south of U.S. Route 44. The pond is not open to the public. The Sisters of Divine Providence ran Camp Mishannock, a summer camp for girls, at this pond for forty years. The campground was purchased by the Native Land Conservancy a nonprofit associated with the Wampanoag tribe. It has been redeveloped in the style of a traditional wetu encampment. The water quality is impaired due to non-native aquatic plants.
