= Massachusetts Route 228 =

State highway in Plymouth County, Massachusetts, US

Route 228
- Route 228 highlighted in red

Route information
- Maintained by MassDOT
- Length: 9.4 mi (15.1 km)
- Existed: 1967–present

Major junctions
- South end: Route 3 in Rockland
- North end: George Washington Boulevard in Hull

Location
- Country: United States
- State: Massachusetts
- Counties: Plymouth

Highway system
- Massachusetts State Highway System; Interstate; US; State
← Route 225	→ Route 240

Route 228 is a rather short 9.4-mile-long (15.1 km) south–north highway in southeastern Massachusetts. Its southern terminus is at Route 3 in Rockland and its northern terminus is at George Washington Boulevard in Hull.

== Route description ==
Route 228 runs from Route 3 in Rockland, goes through Hingham, and ends at the intersection of George Washington Boulevard in Hull.

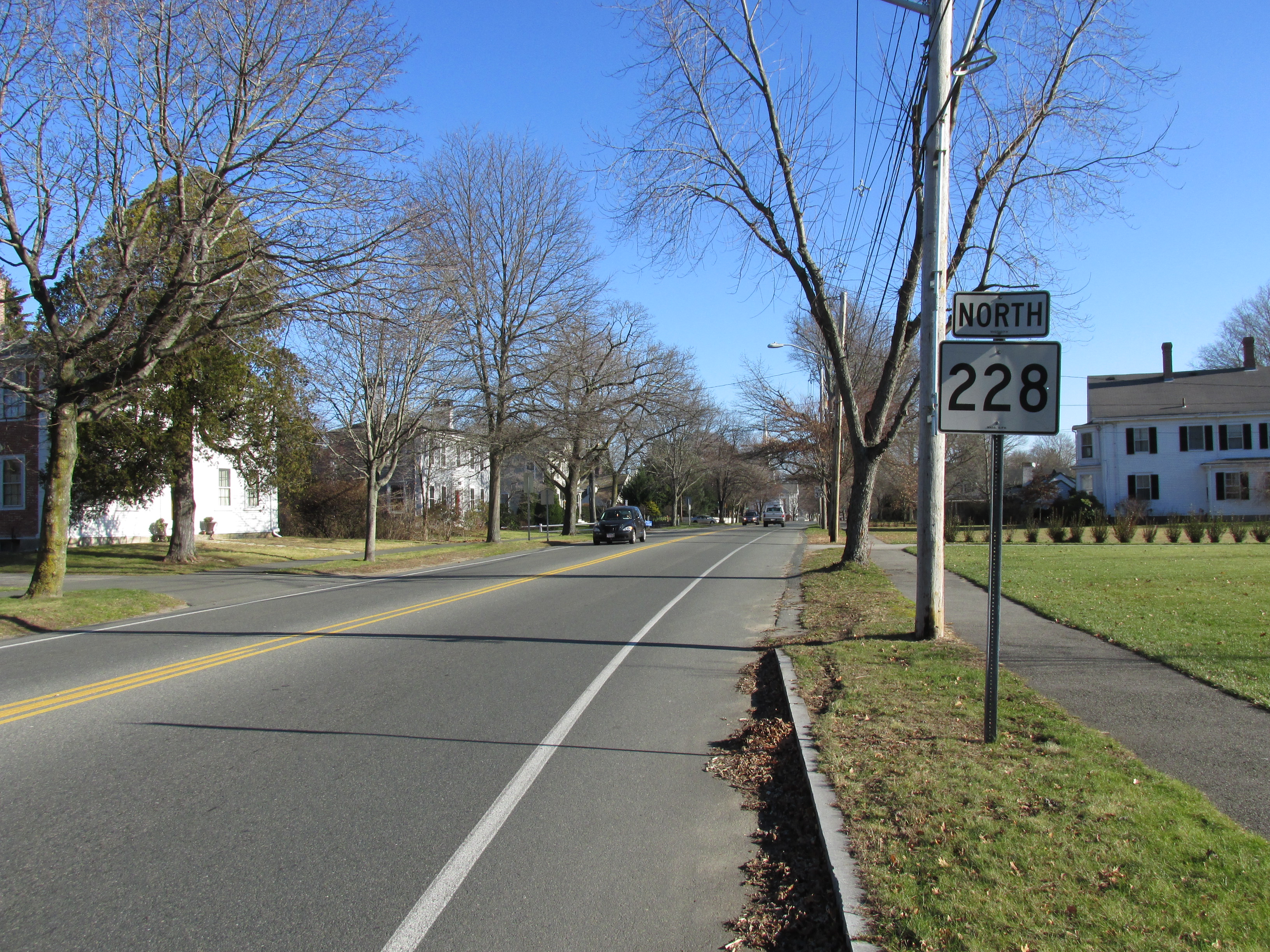
Route 228 northbound in Hingham

The exact streets Route 228 follows are: Hingham Street in Rockland; Pond Street in Norwell; Main Street, Short Street, Leavitt Street, East Street, and Hull Street in Hingham (also signed on Whiting Street and Derby Street, due to former strange concurrency with Route 53, see below); Nantasket Avenue in Hull. The center line of Hull Street from north of Glastonbury Abbey to the Hull town line is the town line between Hingham and Cohasset, which is not signed.

== History ==
The route was designated in 1967, taking over the Hingham and Hull portions of the circumferential Route 128 when that route was truncated back to its intersection with Route 3 in Braintree. The Route 128 designation was established in the late 1920s. Due to complaints about the amount of traffic on Hingham's historic Main Street and other roads in town, the state first proposed building a bypass route starting in the 1930s, however there was never enough funding to start construction.

The Massachusetts Department of Public Works (MDPW) finally put together a plan to build a relocated Route 228, or "Route 228 Spur" in the late 1960s. On February 29, 1968, at Hingham High School, the MDPW presented a plan for an 8-mile, four-lane freeway 250 to 400 feet wide that would run from Route 3 to George Washington Boulevard in Hull. There were three alternatives for the Route 3 interchange: one would have it built in Hingham just south of the existing Derby Street exit with the freeway heading east paralleling Derby and Gardner Streets; the other two were in Norwell; the Pond Street alternative would re-make the existing Route 228 interchange; the third alternative would move the exit further south near where Route 3 crossed Webster Street. All three alternatives would meet at the 'Common Line' near Prospect Street in Hingham and follow a path north, paralleling the western side of what today is Wompatuck State Park. North of Free Street, where an interchange would be built, the MDPW again presented three possible routes northward to George Washington Boulevard: West Line and West-Central Line alternatives that would have paralleled Union Street and would have relocated the Weir River and Triphammer Pond, and an Eastern Line alternative which would have left the waterways alone but paralleled the Weir River through the Turkey Hill area. Each alternative would have included a large interchange with Route 3A with that route being upgraded to a divided highway in the vicinity of the exit. The two Western alternatives would have used the existing George Washington Boulevard bridge (upgraded to handle more traffic) to cross the Weir River into Hull, while the Eastern alternative would have used a new bridge to be constructed to the east and meet George Washington Boulevard near the Hull Dump. Each of the alternatives would have condemned between 17 and 26 homes along the proposed route and cost between $12 million and $14 million. Hingham town officials were receptive to the plan as long as the route started in Norwell and used the Eastern Line Alternative, with an additional interchange at Rockland Street. The townspeople of Norwell, though, voted to oppose any route through their town, citing fears of contaminating their water supply. At a special town meeting in Hingham on September 30, 1968, citizens voted to oppose the Route 228 proposal, 559–506, especially because, due to Norwell's earlier vote, it appeared the MDPW was leaning toward the Hingham interchange alternative. The town did vote, however, 422–231, that if the route were to be built despite the town's opposition, that the Pond Street interchange and Eastern Line alternative would be the only proposal Hingham would accept. Continued opposition to routing the freeway in Norwell and parts of Hingham into the early 1970s eventually led the MDPW to give up on the plan. Increased traffic along Main Street in Hingham though since then led, after many years of deliberation by Hingham's citizens, to the installation of the first traffic light along the street at the Free Street/Union Street intersection in 2010.

=== Routing with Route 53 ===
One of the more distinctive aspects of this short state route was its signed concurrency with Route 53. Traffic heading southbound on Route 228 when approaching Route 53 at Queen Anne's Corner on the Hingham/Norwell town line would sees signs directing traffic on Route 228 South to turn right onto Route 53 North in a wrong-way concurrency for about one mile (1.6 km), not to travel back along its northbound path in Norwell and Rockland. Instead this route never left Hingham, traveling further along the original path of Route 228 along Whiting and Derby Streets. At the point the two routes split, the intersection with Derby Street, Route 228 suddenly becomes a Northbound route. The reassurance shield lists Route 228 North at the beginning of Derby Street, the last reassurance shield in this direction. When traveling south on Route 53 past the Derby Street intersection, the road is signed as Route 53 South and Route 228 South. The concurrency ends at Queen Anne's Corner when Route 228's signage assumes its correct Northbound direction. This however implied there were two distinct Route 228 routings. Maps and Massachusetts Highway Department documents over the years disagree as to whether the Derby and Whiting Street section is officially Route 228. The southbound wrong-way concurrency existed since Route 228 was established, the signs on north Route 53 only appeared during the 1980s. The main purpose of the southbound routing was to help traffic move through the congested Queen Anne's Corner intersection and take a more efficient path to northbound Route 3. After a widening project to improve this intersection was completed in the summer of 2007, however, the signs indicating this routing disappeared. Signs on South 228 and the rest of the intersection now indicate Route 228 South proceeds straight through the intersection from Main Street onto Pond Street and on to Route 3 at Exit 14 (guide signs on Route 53 North at Derby Street were eventually changed as well in 2014 with text 'Derby Street' replacing the MA 228 shields on each sign, though guide signage on Derby Street and North and South 228 shield reassurance markers remain).

== Major intersections ==
The entire route is in Plymouth County.

Location	mi	km	Destinations	Notes
Rockland	0.000	0.000	Route 3 (Pilgrim Highway) / Hingham Street west – Braintree, Boston, Plymouth, Cape Cod	Southern terminus; exit 35 on Route 3; continues west without designation; partial cloverleaf interchange
Hingham	1.003	1.614	Route 53 (Whiting Street / Washington Street) – South Weymouth, Braintree, Hanover	
Hingham	6.734	10.837	Route 3A (Chief Justice Cushing Highway) – Cohasset, Scituate, Quincy	
Hull	9.400	15.128	George Washington Boulevard	Northern terminus; continues north as Nantasket Avenue
1.000 mi = 1.609 km; 1.000 km = 0.621 mi
