= Massachusetts Route 37 =

North-south state highway in Massachusetts, US

Route 37
- Route 37 highlighted in red

Route information
- Maintained by MassDOT
- Length: 9.54 mi (15.35 km)

Major junctions
- South end: Route 28 in Brockton
- Route 139 in Holbrook
- North end: I-93 / US 1 / Route 3 in Braintree

Location
- Country: United States
- State: Massachusetts
- Counties: Plymouth, Norfolk

Highway system
- Massachusetts State Highway System; Interstate; US; State
← Route 36	→ Route 38

Route 37 is a 9.54-mile-long (15.35 km) north–south state highway in eastern Massachusetts. Its southern terminus is at Route 28 in Brockton and its northern terminus is at Interstate 93 (I-93) and U.S. Route 1 (US 1) in Braintree.

== Route description ==
Route 37 begins in the north end of the city of Brockton at Route 28. After crossing the Middleborough Main Line and passing Montello station, it enters the town of Holbrook. It winds through the center of that town, where it intersects Route 139. It then enters Braintree, passing through the Highlands and crossing the rail line again, before bearing left off of Hancock Street onto Washington Street. As Franklin Street, it passes Sunset Lake, west of the town center, before going through the Five Corners neighborhood. It then passes the Quincy Reservoir and South Shore Plaza before ending at I-93/US 1/Route 3's Exit 6, just west of the Braintree Split.

Route 37 was truncated to its current northern terminus by 1959 following the completion of the Southeast Expressway (current I-93/US 1/Route 3), formerly extending along Willard Street through Quincy and Granite Avenue through East Milton before ending at Gallivan Boulevard (now Route 203) in the Neponset neighborhood of Boston. The road also had two separate connections with Route 128. Prior to the building of the highway portions of the road, Route 128 was concurrent with Route 37 from the intersection of Hancock Street and Washington Street to the intersection of Franklin Street and West Street (the "Five Corners"). Once the highway portion (now I-93) was built, Route 128 followed that highway to the Braintree Split, intersecting Route 37 at its now northern terminus. Since 1997, however, 128 has officially ended at the I-95/I-93 split in Canton. The truncation of Route 37 to Braintree also lead to the decommissioning of its Route C37 extension into Boston.

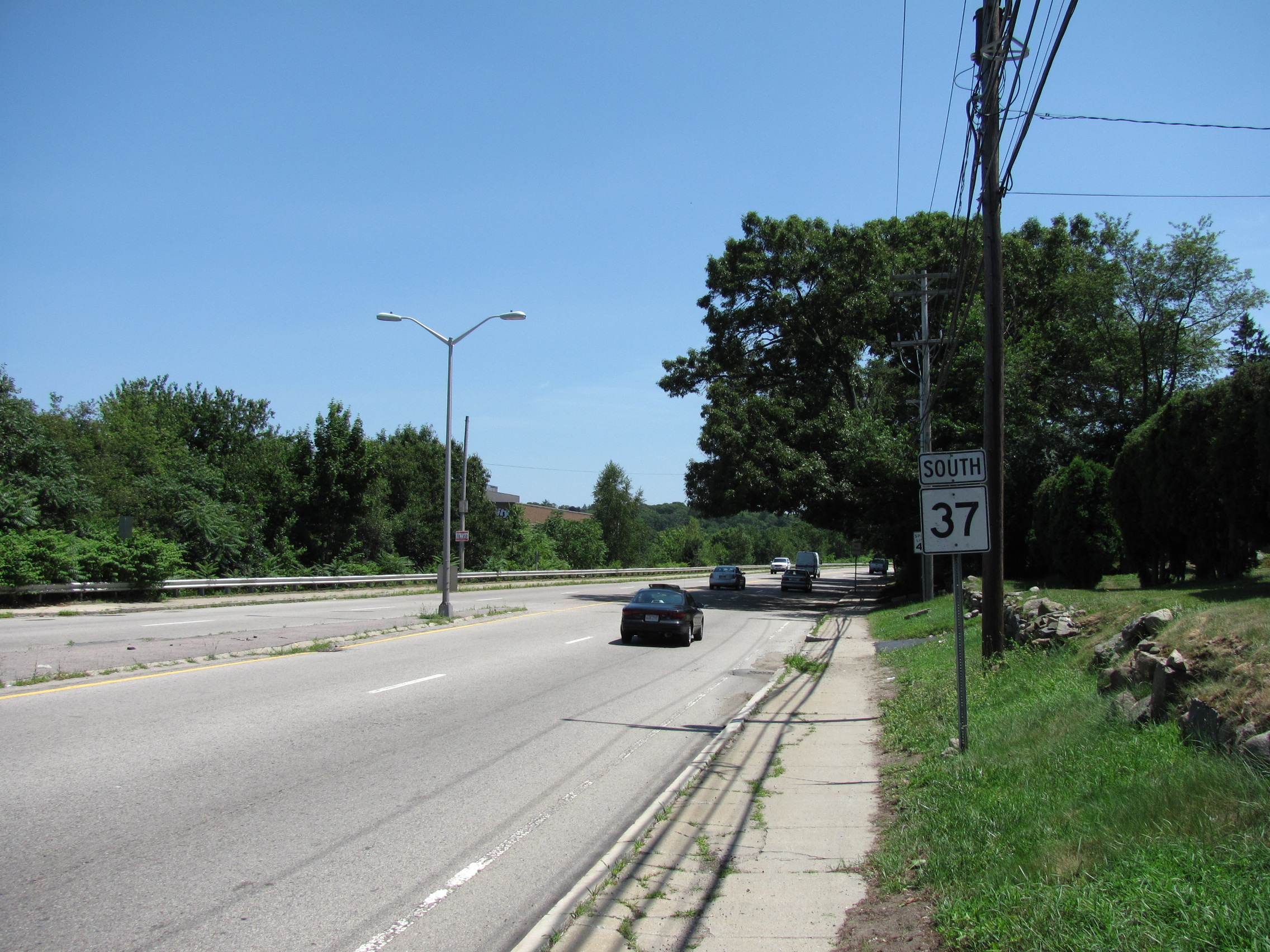
Rte. 37 just south of the South Shore Plaza.

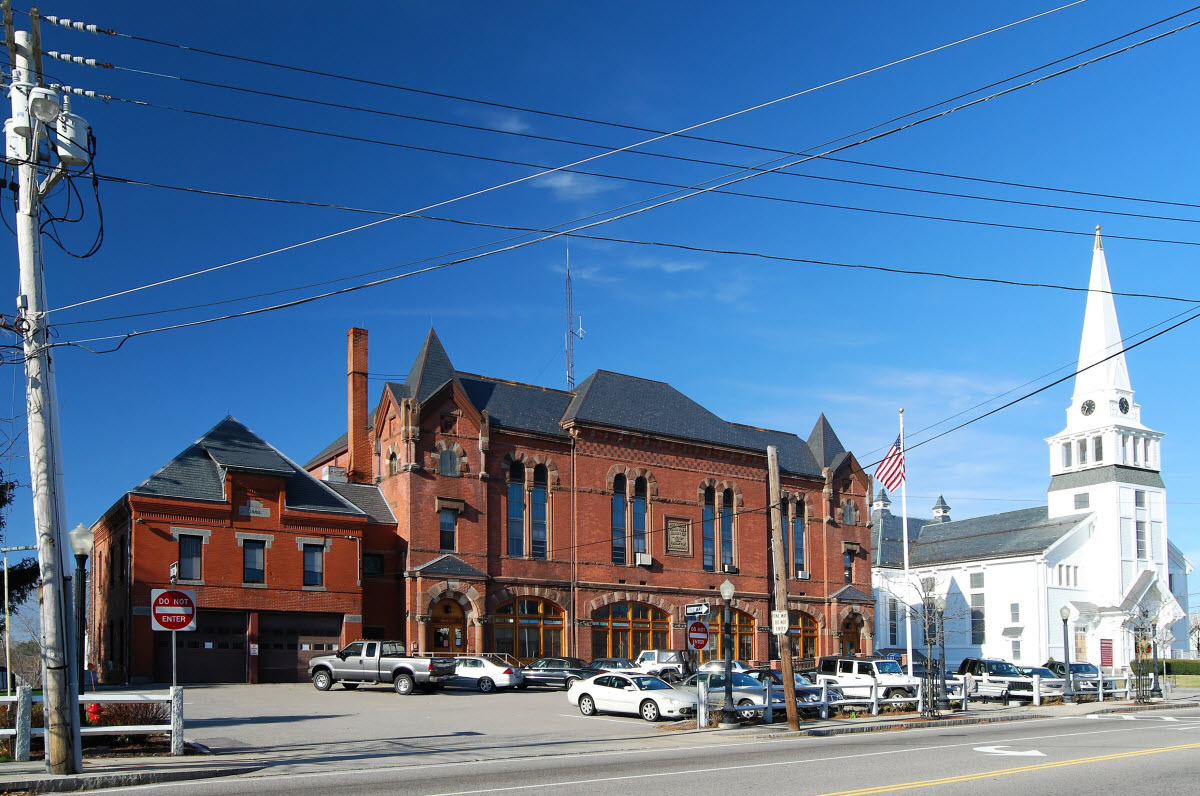
Rte. 37 passes the Holbrook Town Hall and Winthrop Congregational Church.

== Major intersections ==
County	Location	mi	km	Destinations	Notes
Plymouth	Brockton	0.00	0.00	Route 28 – West Bridgewater, Middleborough, Avon, Milton	Southern terminus
Norfolk	Holbrook	3.20	5.15	Route 139 – North Abington, Hanover, Randolph	
Norfolk	Braintree	9.54	15.35	I-93 / US 1 / Route 3 (Route 128 north) to I-95 north – Boston, Braintree, Cape Cod, Dedham, Providence, RI	Northern terminus; exit 6 on I-93 / US 1; former Route 128; partial cloverleaf interchange
1.000 mi = 1.609 km; 1.000 km = 0.621 mi
