= Plimoth Patuxet Highway =

Highway in Massachusetts

- Plimoth Plantation Highway
- Plimoth Patuxet Highway highlighted in purple

Route information
- Length: 2.04 mi (3.28 km)
- Existed: 1951–present

Major junctions
- West end: Route 3 in Plymouth
- East end: Route 3A in Plymouth

Location
- Country: United States
- State: Massachusetts
- Counties: Plymouth

Highway system
- Massachusetts State Highway System; Interstate; US; State

The Plimoth Patuxet Highway, formerly the Plimoth Plantation Highway, is a two-lane divided freeway with plastic stanchions posted on a rumbled asphalt median in Plymouth in the US state of Massachusetts. The highway was created in 1951 as a segment of Route 3 between the modern highway and its previous alignment. The current name for the roadway was designated by the state in 2023.

== Route description ==
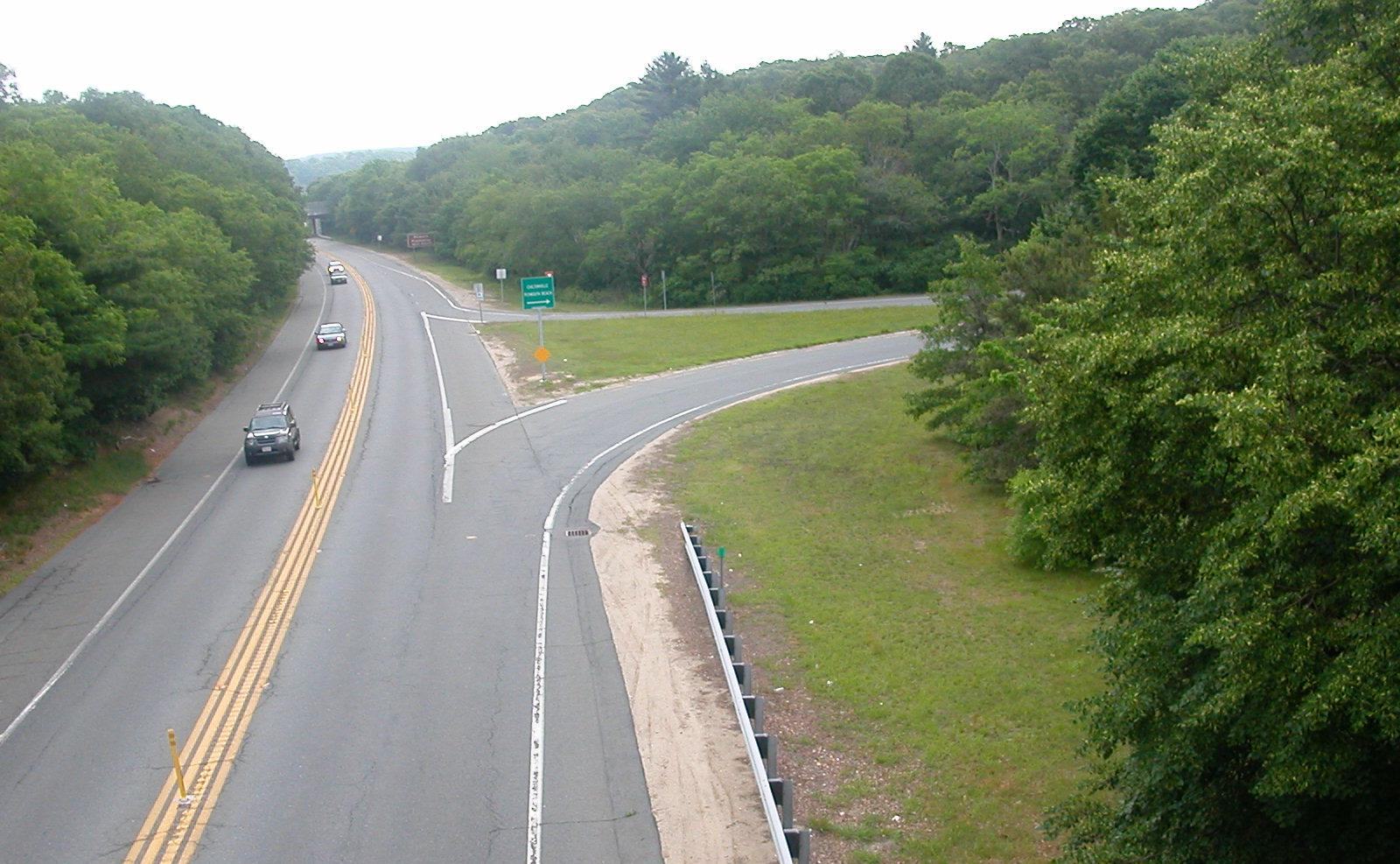
Looking eastward from the Sandwich Road Bridge

The highway begins at exit 12 off Route 3, a partial interchange which is accessible only from the southbound side from which there is a left exit. Motorists on Plimoth Patuxet Highway headed toward Route 3 can enter that highway northbound only. However, motorists can use exit 13 to reverse direction and travel southbound on Route 3. The highway proceeds east, serving Plimoth Patuxet, Plymouth Beach and the village of Chiltonville. The highway ends at a special intersection in White Horse Beach and Manomet at Route 3A.

== History ==
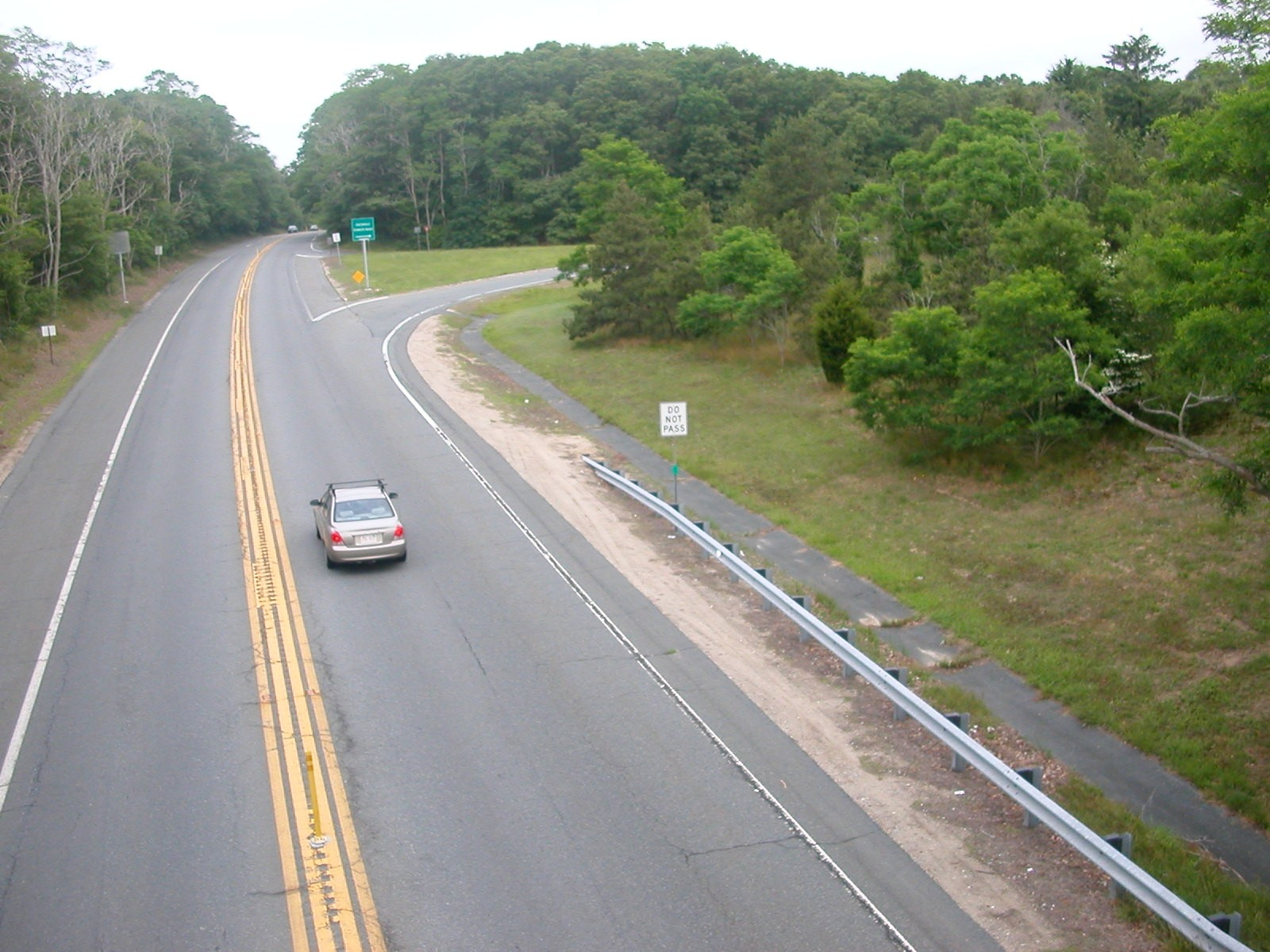
Looking westward from the Sandwich Road Bridge

The first segment of Route 3 opened up in 1951 from what is now exit 18 to exit 12 and used the Plimoth Patuxet Highway temporarily to detour around the old Route 3 in Kingston and Plymouth, now renamed Route 3A, until 1957 when Route 3 south of exit 12 opened and assumed its current alignment. An act naming the two-mile (3.2 km) spur Plimoth Plantation Highway was approved on April 3, 1969, 18 years after the highway had opened. That act references the highway as being exit 40, the old exit number before the Massachusetts Highway Department renumbered the exit in 1978. The highway was renamed again to Plimoth Patuxet Highway effective January 2, 2023.

== Exit list ==
The entire route is in Plymouth, Plymouth County. All exits are unnumbered.

mi	km	Destinations	Notes
0.0	0.0	Route 3 north – Brockton, Boston	Western terminus; exit 12 on Route 3
0.9	1.4	Sandwich Road – Chiltonville, Plymouth Beach	
1.3	2.1	Plimoth Patuxet	Eastbound exit and entrance via River Street
2.0	3.2	Route 3A – Manomet, White Horse Beach	Eastern terminus
1.000 mi = 1.609 km; 1.000 km = 0.621 mi
