= Wampatuck Pond =

Lake of the United States of America

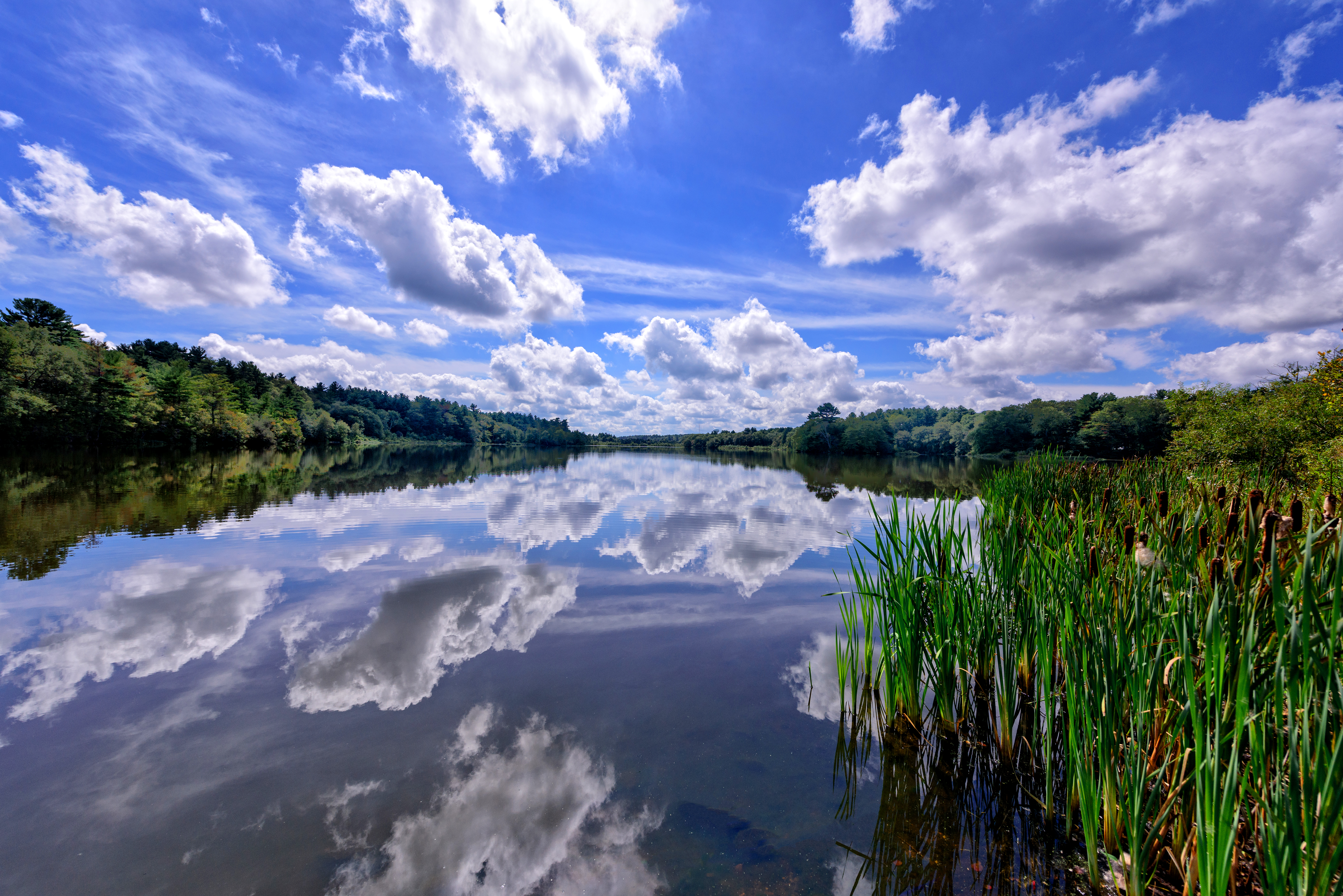

- Location within Massachusetts
- Location: Hanson, Massachusetts
- Coordinates: 42°03′54″N 70°51′54″W
- Primary inflows: Indian Head Brook
- Primary outflows: Indian Head Brook
- Basin countries: United States
- Surface area: 64 acres (26 ha)
- Settlements: Hanson, Massachusetts

Wampatuck Pond is a 64-acre (260,000 m^{2}) pond in Hanson, Massachusetts. Indian Head Brook both flows in and out of the pond. Along the northern shore of the pond are the Routes 14 and 58 concurrency, Hanson's Town Hall, and a small park. Kings Landing way is adjacent from fern hill cemetery opposite the pond. Native American burial site sits next to a man made pond on 34 and 54 kings landing way plots. Cranberry bogs on Main Street abut the town forest and southern side river ways to the pond.Access to the pond includes a concrete ramp behind the Hanson town hall managed by the Town of Hanson suitable for three trailers and six cars. The water quality is toxic and impaired due to noxious aquatic plants.
