= Scituate (CDP), Massachusetts =

Scituate, Massachusetts
- Census-designated place
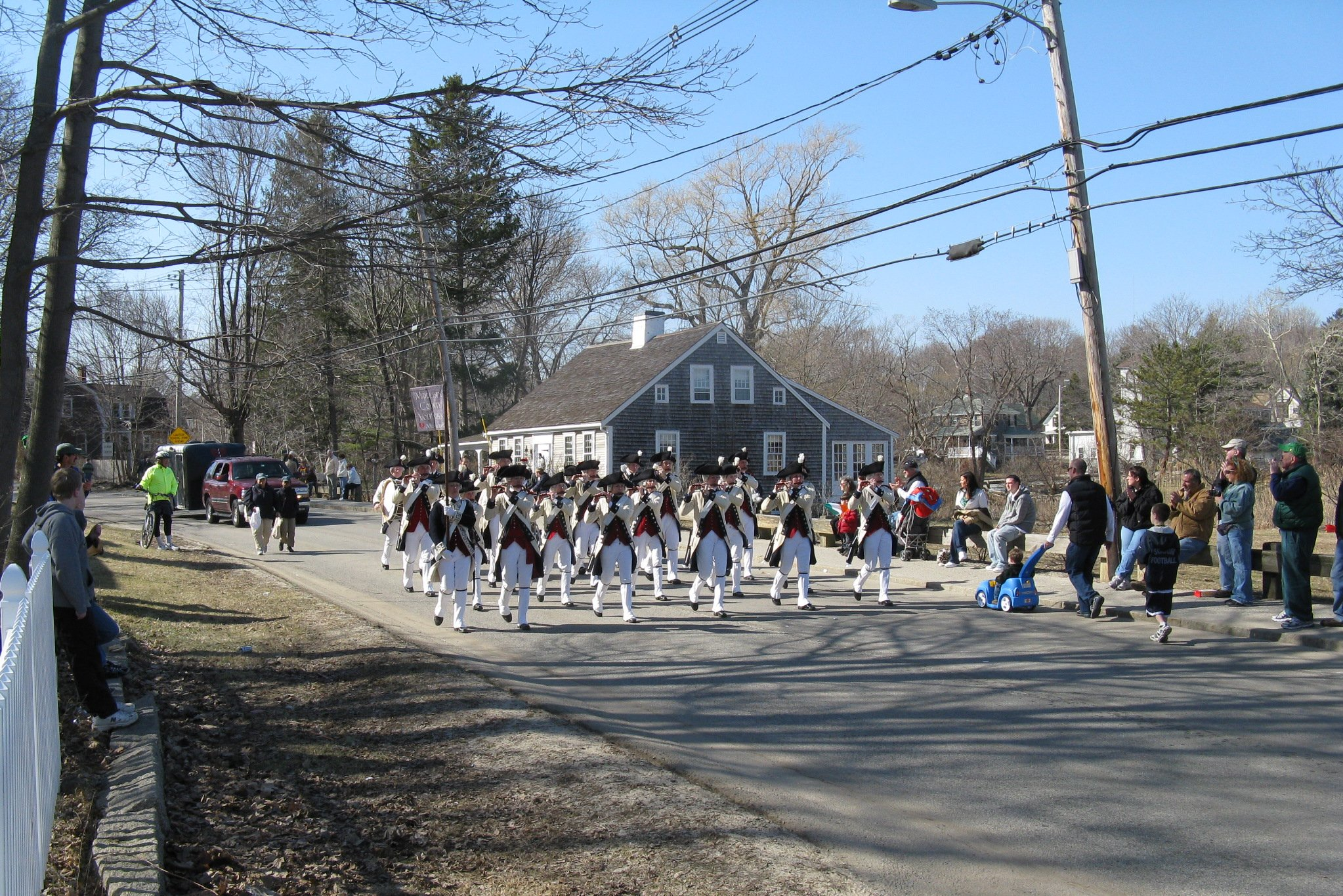
- St. Patrick Day's Parade

- Location in Plymouth County in Massachusetts
- Coordinates: 42°11′21″N 70°44′2″W
- Country: United States
- State: Massachusetts
- County: Plymouth

Area
  - Total: 4.91 sq mi (12.72 km^{2})
  - Land: 4.06 sq mi (10.52 km^{2})
  - Water: 0.85 sq mi (2.19 km^{2})
- Elevation: 36 ft (11 m)

Population (2020)
  - Total: 5,620
  - Density: 1,380/sq mi (534/km^{2})
- Time zone: UTC-5 (Eastern (EST))
  - Summer (DST): UTC-4 (EDT)
- ZIP Code: 02066
- Area code: 781
- FIPS code: 25-60295
- GNIS feature ID: 0615361

Scituate (/ˈsɪtʃueɪt, -ɪt/) is a census-designated place (CDP) in the town of Scituate in Plymouth County, Massachusetts, United States. The population was 5,245 at the 2010 census.

== Geography ==
Scituate is located at 42°11′21″N 70°44′1″W (42.189231, -70.733832).

According to the United States Census Bureau, the CDP has a total area of 12.5 km^{2} (4.8 mi^{2}), of which 10.6 km^{2} (4.1 mi^{2}) is land and 1.9 km^{2} (0.7 mi^{2}) (15.11%) is water.

== Demographics ==
Historical population
Census	Pop.	Note	%±
2020	5,620		—
U.S. Decennial Census

As of the census of 2000, there were 5,069 people, 2,055 households, and 1,383 families residing in the CDP. The population density was 478.5/km^{2} (1,238.4/mi^{2}). There were 2,189 housing units at an average density of 206.6/km^{2} (534.8/mi^{2}). The racial makeup of the CDP was 95.76% White, 1.03% Black or African American, 0.06% Native American, 0.53% Asian, 1.32% from other races, and 1.30% from two or more races. Hispanic or Latino of any race were 0.77% of the population.

There were 2,055 households, out of which 27.5% had children under the age of 18 living with them, 56.0% were married couples living together, 9.0% had a female householder with no husband present, and 32.7% were non-families. 28.1% of all households were made up of individuals, and 14.3% had someone living alone who was 65 years of age or older. The average household size was 2.44 and the average family size was 3.02.

In the CDP, the population was spread out, with 22.5% under the age of 18, 4.3% from 18 to 24, 26.6% from 25 to 44, 28.3% from 45 to 64, and 18.2% who were 65 years of age or older. The median age was 43 years. For every 100 females, there were 85.3 males. For every 100 females age 18 and over, there were 83.9 males.

The median income for a household in the CDP was $62,392, and the median income for a family was $75,848. Males had a median income of $53,125 versus $38,910 for females. The per capita income for the CDP was $29,845. About 2.0% of families and 3.8% of the population were below the poverty line, including 2.4% of those under age 18 and 5.5% of those age 65 or over.
