= Ocean Bluff-Brant Rock, Massachusetts =

- Census-designated place
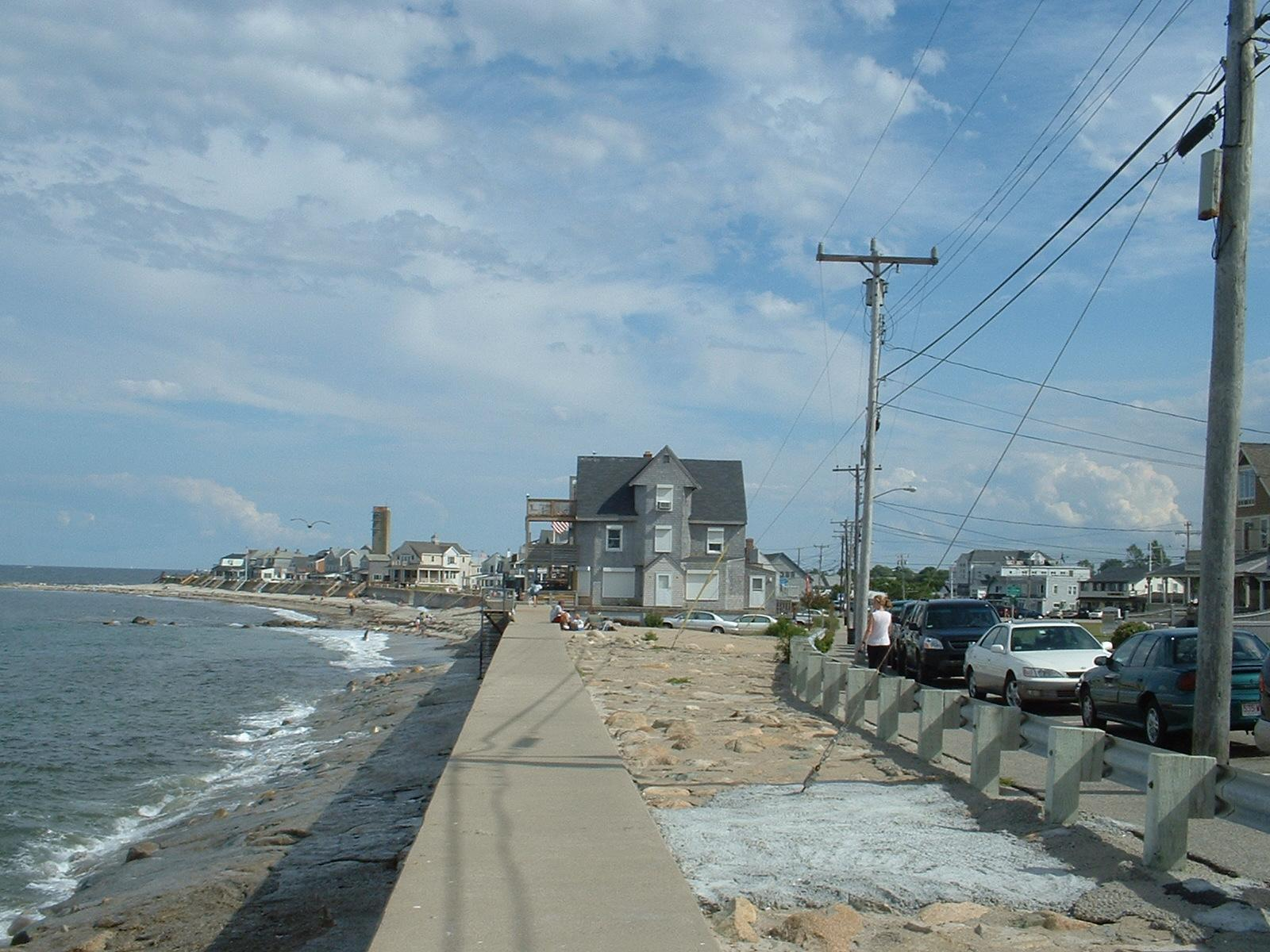
- Ocean Bluff looking south

- Location in Plymouth County in Massachusetts
- Coordinates: 42°6′6″N 70°39′39″W
- Country: United States
- State: Massachusetts
- County: Plymouth

Area
  - Total: 4.39 sq mi (11.37 km^{2})
  - Land: 2.17 sq mi (5.63 km^{2})
  - Water: 2.22 sq mi (5.74 km^{2})

Population (2020)
  - Total: 4,744
  - Density: 2,181.5/sq mi (842.28/km^{2})
- Time zone: UTC-5 (Eastern (EST))
  - Summer (DST): UTC-4 (EDT)
- ZIP Codes: 02020 (Brant Rock); 02065 (Ocean Bluff)
- Area code: 781/339
- FIPS code: 25-50862

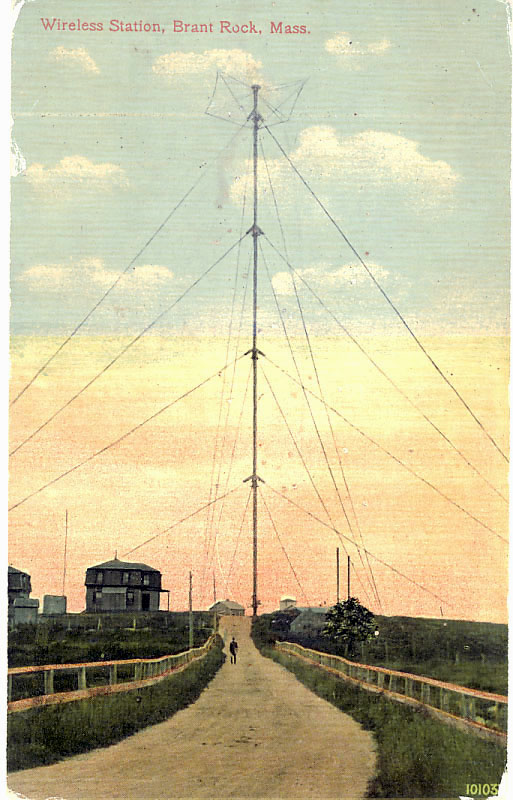
Postcard image, from around 1910, of the 420-foot-tall (128 m) Brant Rock radio tower

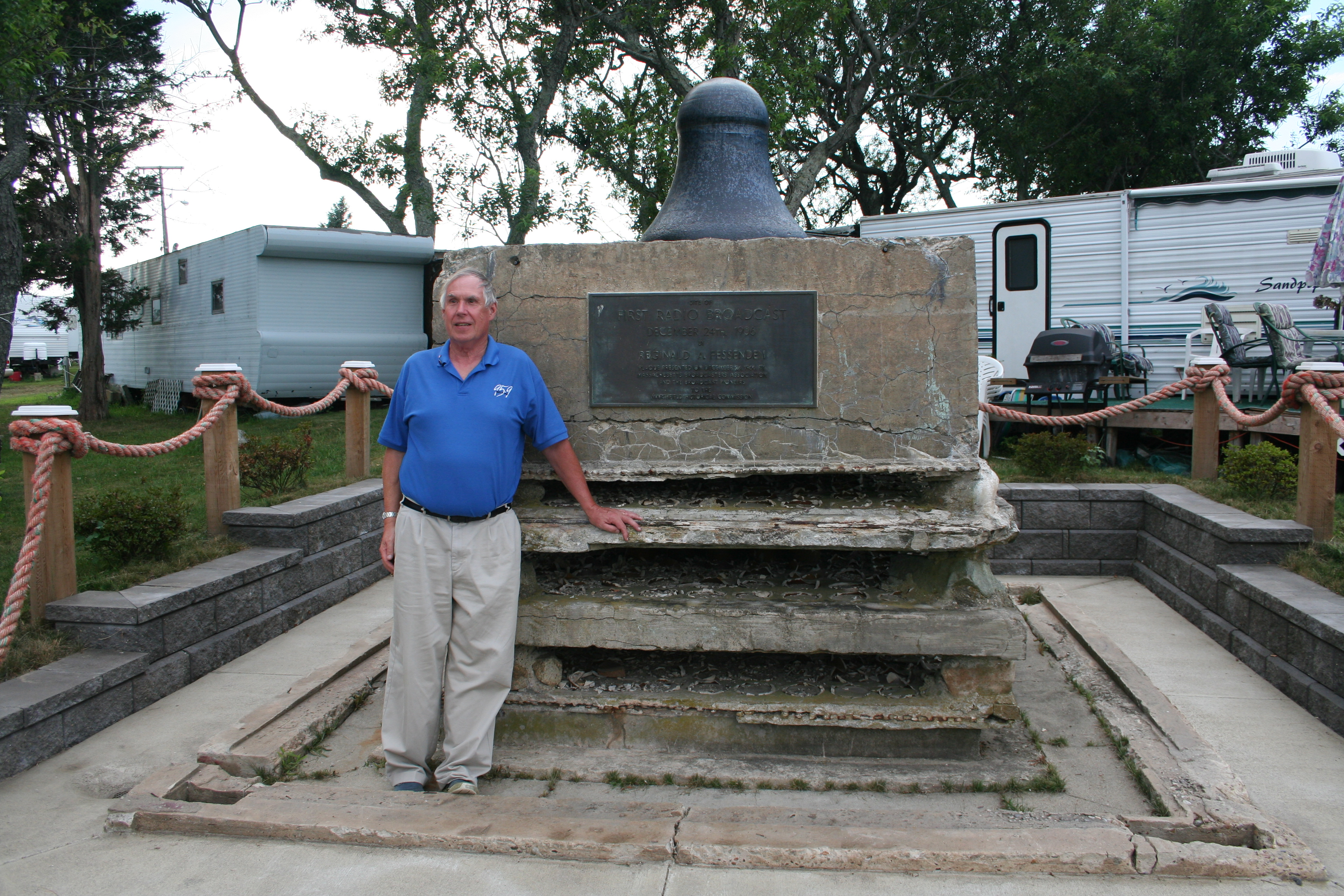
Although Fessenden's antenna in Brant Rock was demolished in 1917, the insulated base on which it stood still survives. The layers of concrete were originally separated by arrays of ceramic insulators.

Ocean Bluff-Brant Rock is a census-designated place (CDP) in Plymouth County, Massachusetts, United States, composed of the neighborhoods of Ocean Bluff, Brant Rock, Fieldston, and Rexhame in the town of Marshfield. As of the 2020 census, Ocean Bluff-Brant Rock had a population of 4,744.

== History ==
Brant Rock and Ocean Bluff were originally inhabited by Native Americans, including members of the Wampanoag tribe of the Algonquian peoples. Native American artifacts have been found extensively in the area. The main road through the area, known today as Ocean Street, is a Native American road, likely very ancient. The area at the end of Brant Rock village, known as Blackman's Point, was a Native American campground.

In the 1630s, the government of the Pilgrim settlers at Plymouth began to give out land grants in the area.

The Ocean Bluff area was first granted to the governor of the Pilgrims. It was known by about 1638 as "Governor's Island.” Later on in the 17th century, it became known as "Winter's Island". Christopher Winter was later tried in Plymouth Court for the crime of fathering his own grandchild. Eventually, his daughter married a man named John Hewitt, and he became the owner of Winter's Island. For many generations the area was known as Hewitt's Island, or Hewitt's Point. However, most modern residents refer to the area as "Ocean Bluff.”

Brant Rock was originally known as "Branch's Island.” The name "Brant Rock" eventually came into use, because of the huge rock outcropping along the beach on which brant geese would tend to rest. From the 17th century through the late 19th century, the area was primarily used for salt marsh haying, cattle grazing, and for fishing and fowling. In the late 19th century, the area became populated by large summer resort hotels and tourist shops.

Hewitt's Island and Branch's Island were sometimes referred to as the "Spectacle Islands", because together the islands looked like a pair of spectacles or eyeglasses. After the Green Harbor Dyke was built following the Civil War, the tidal salt marshes in the area dried up. The Spectacle Islands were no longer surrounded by water from the tidal flooding of the marshes, and ceased to constitute "islands".

In January 1906, Reginald Fessenden achieved the first two-way transatlantic radiotelegraph transmission, exchanging Morse code messages between his stations in Brant Rock and Machrihanish, Scotland. (Marconi had only achieved one-way transmissions prior to his date). On Christmas Eve, December 24, 1906, Fessenden transmitted from Brant Rock Station the first radio broadcast of music and entertainment in history. Radio operators on ships in the Atlantic heard Fessenden playing the song "O Holy Night" on the violin and reading a passage from the Bible.

== Geography ==
Ocean Bluff and Brant Rock are located at 42°6′6″N 70°39′39″W (42.101561, -70.660787), and are part of the town of Marshfield.

According to the United States Census Bureau, the CDP has a total area of 11.3 km^{2} (4.4 sq mi), of which 5.3 km^{2} (2.0 sq mi) is land and 6.0 km^{2} (2.3 sq mi) is water, a total of 53.09%.

Ocean Bluff (02065) and Brant Rock (02020) contain five public beaches: Sunrise Beach, Ocean Bluff Beach, Brant Rock Beach, Blackman's Point, and Bluefish Cove. All of these beaches, as well as the rest of the Marshfield seashore from Green Harbor village to Rexhame village, were once known by the name of "Marshfield Beach". In 1832, the Supreme Judicial Court of Massachusetts ruled in the case of Briggs Thomas v. Inhabitants of Marshfield, 13 Pickering 240, that Rexhame Beach as well as all of the rest of "Marshfield Beach" was a "common,” open for use by all members of the public.

During the summer time, especially along Sunrise Beach and Ocean Bluff, skim boarding and surfing are very popular. Brant Rock is home to an annual lobster festival that takes place on September 12. Flooding is very common during high tide, and strong storms such as nor'easters waves rise high above the sea wall /.

== Demographics ==
Historical population
Census	Pop.	Note	%±
2020	4,744		—
U.S. Decennial Census

=== 2020 census ===
As of the 2020 census, Ocean Bluff-Brant Rock had a population of 4,744. The median age was 51.9 years. 15.4% of residents were under the age of 18 and 24.1% of residents were 65 years of age or older. For every 100 females there were 90.4 males, and for every 100 females age 18 and over there were 89.1 males age 18 and over.

100.0% of residents lived in urban areas, while 0.0% lived in rural areas.

There were 2,122 households in Ocean Bluff-Brant Rock, of which 20.3% had children under the age of 18 living in them. Of all households, 45.6% were married-couple households, 17.5% were households with a male householder and no spouse or partner present, and 31.2% were households with a female householder and no spouse or partner present. About 32.8% of all households were made up of individuals and 16.9% had someone living alone who was 65 years of age or older.

There were 2,889 housing units, of which 26.5% were vacant. The homeowner vacancy rate was 0.8% and the rental vacancy rate was 5.8%.

Racial composition as of the 2020 census
Race	Number	Percent
White	4,554	96.0%
Black or African American	17	0.4%
American Indian and Alaska Native	1	0.0%
Asian	12	0.3%
Native Hawaiian and Other Pacific Islander	1	0.0%
Some other race	29	0.6%
Two or more races	130	2.7%
Hispanic or Latino (of any race)	68	1.4%

=== 2000 census ===
As of the census of 2000, there were 5,100 people, 2,004 households, and 1,320 families residing in the CDP. The population density was 960.5 people /km^{2} (2,488 people/mi^{2}). There were 2,657 housing units at an average density of 500.4 units /km^{2} (1,296 units/mi^{2}). The racial makeup of the CDP was 98.35% White, 0.29% African American, 0.08% Native American, 0.29% Asian, 0.29% from other races, and 0.69% from two or more races. Hispanic or Latino of any race were 0.53% of the population.

There were 2,004 households, out of which 32.4% had children under the age of 18 living with them, 49.2% were married couples living together, 13.3% had a female householder with no husband present, and 34.1% were non-families. 26.5% of all households were made up of individuals, and 8.2% had someone living alone who was 65 years of age or older. The average household size was 2.54 and the average family size was 3.14.

In the CDP, the population was spread out, with 25.5% under the age of 18, 5.9% from 18 to 24, 33.0% from 25 to 44, 25.1% from 45 to 64, and 10.5% who were 65 years of age or older. The median age was 38 years. For every 100 females, there were 94.7 males. For every 100 females age 18 and over, there were 90.1 males.

The median income for a household in the CDP was $56,840, and the median income for a family was $60,552. Males had a median income of $42,388 versus $35,902 for females. The per capita income for the CDP was $24,292. About 3.1% of families and 5.3% of the population were below the poverty line, including 7.6% of those under age 18 and 3.4% of those age 65 or over.

== Popular culture ==
The climax of the 2018 film The Equalizer 2, starring Denzel Washington, unfolds on Brant Rock. The protagonist, Robert McCall is a Defense Intelligence Agency operative, and the only reprised role in Washington's career.
