= Marshfield (CDP), Massachusetts =

Marshfield, Massachusetts
- Census-designated place
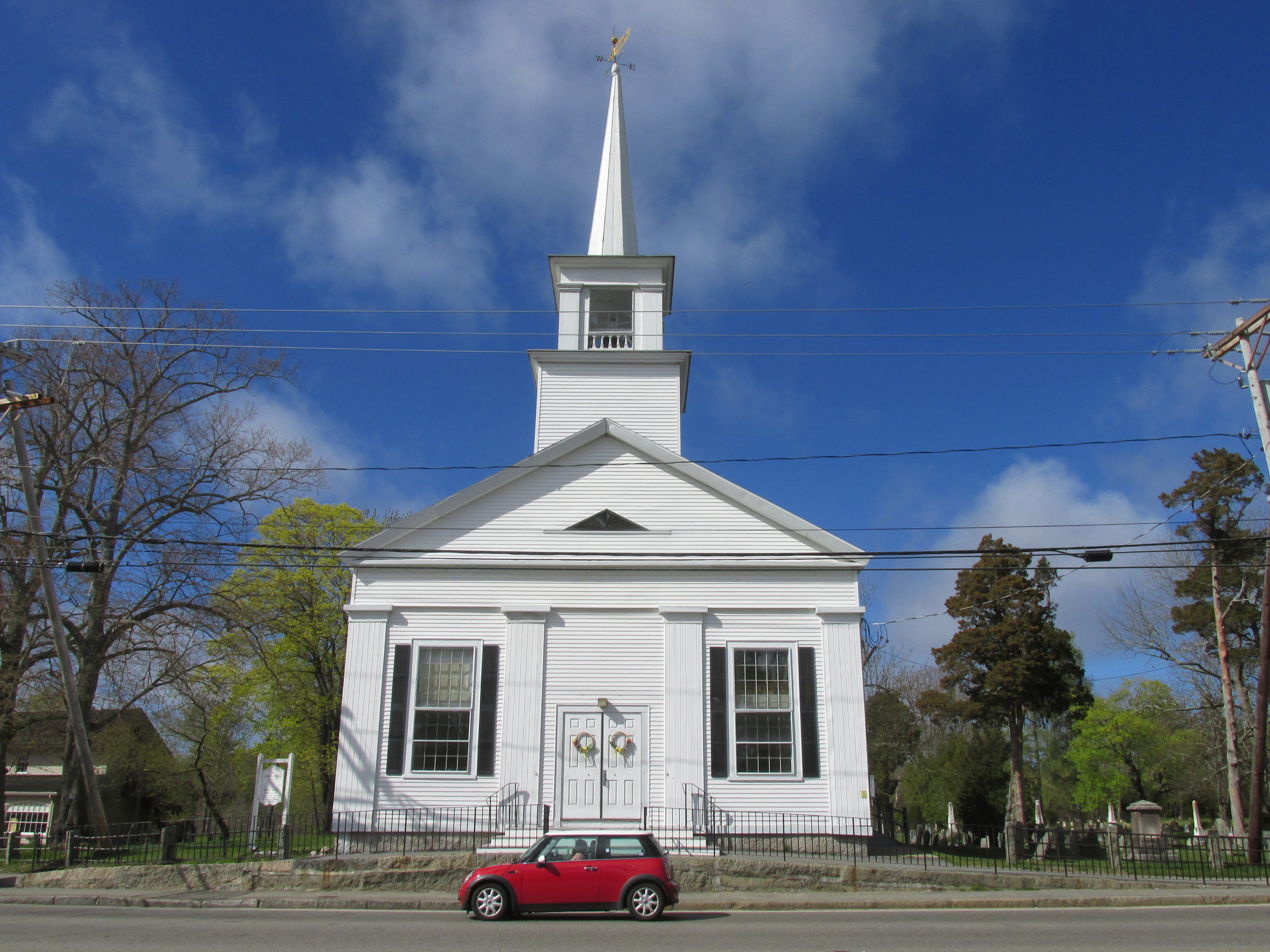
- First Congregational Church

- Location in Plymouth County in Massachusetts
- Coordinates: 42°5′40″N 70°42′34″W
- Country: United States
- State: Massachusetts
- County: Plymouth

Area
  - Total: 5.13 sq mi (13.28 km^{2})
  - Land: 5.05 sq mi (13.09 km^{2})
  - Water: 0.077 sq mi (0.20 km^{2})
- Elevation: 16 ft (5 m)

Population (2020)
  - Total: 4,653
  - Density: 920.8/sq mi (355.54/km^{2})
- Time zone: UTC-5 (Eastern (EST))
  - Summer (DST): UTC-4 (EDT)
- ZIP Code: 02050
- Area code: 781
- FIPS code: 25-38820
- GNIS feature ID: 0615217

Marshfield is a census-designated place (CDP) in the town of Marshfield in Plymouth County, Massachusetts, United States. The population was 4,335 at the 2010 census.

== Geography ==
Marshfield is located at 42°5′40″N 70°42′34″W (42.094577, -70.709485).

According to the United States Census Bureau, the CDP has a total area of 13.4 km^{2} (5.2 sq mi), of which 13.2 km^{2} (5.1 sq mi) is land and 0.2 km^{2} (0.077 sq mi) (1.55%) is water.

== Demographics ==
Historical population
Census	Pop.	Note	%±
2020	4,653		—
U.S. Decennial Census

As of the census of 2000, there were 4,246 people, 1,686 households, and 1,129 families residing in the CDP. The population density was 322.1 people/km^{2} (834 people/mi^{2}). There were 1,742 housing units at an average density of 132.1 units/km^{2} (342 units/mi^{2}). The racial makeup of the CDP was 97.83% White, 0.52% Black or African American, 0.14% Native American, 0.45% Asian, 0.02% Pacific Islander, 0.21% from other races, and 0.82% from two or more races. Hispanic or Latino of any race were 0.68% of the population.

There were 1,686 households, out of which 31.5% had children under the age of 18 living with them, 54.4% were married couples living together, 8.8% had a female householder with no husband present, and 33.0% were non-families. 28.8% of all households were made up of individuals, and 14.8% had someone living alone who was 65 years of age or older. The average household size was 2.52 and the average family size was 3.14.

In the CDP, the population was spread out, with 24.3% under the age of 18, 6.3% from 18 to 24, 29.9% from 25 to 44, 26.3% from 45 to 64, and 13.2% who were 65 years of age or older. The median age was 39 years. For every 100 females, there were 91.7 males. For every 100 females age 18 and over, there were 88.7 males.

The median income for a household in the CDP was $60,037, and the median income for a family was $74,531. Males had a median income of $50,632 versus $33,802 for females. The per capita income for the CDP was $25,656. About 4.1% of families and 6.5% of the population were below the poverty line, including 5.8% of those under age 18 and 7.4% of those age 65 or over.
