= Duxbury (CDP), Massachusetts =

Duxbury, Massachusetts
- Census-designated place
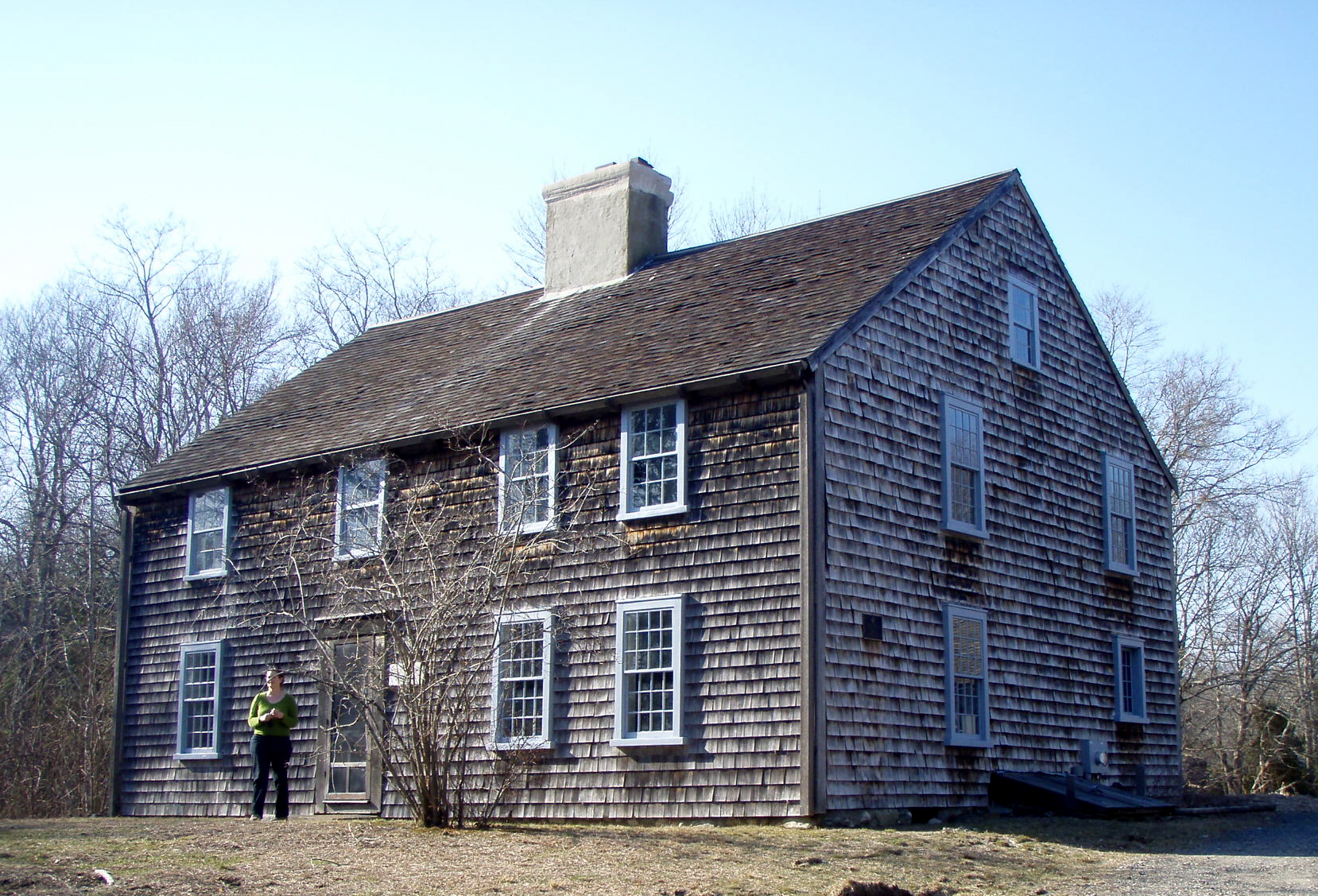
- John Alden House

- Location in Plymouth County in Massachusetts
- Coordinates: 42°2′34″N 70°40′23″W
- Country: United States
- State: Massachusetts
- County: Plymouth

Area
  - Total: 2.66 sq mi (6.89 km^{2})
  - Land: 2.21 sq mi (5.72 km^{2})
  - Water: 0.45 sq mi (1.17 km^{2})
- Elevation: 16 ft (5 m)

Population (2020)
  - Total: 1,896
  - Density: 858.8/sq mi (331.58/km^{2})
- Time zone: UTC-5 (Eastern (EST))
  - Summer (DST): UTC-4 (EDT)
- ZIP codes: 02331-02332
- Area code: 781
- FIPS code: 25-17860
- GNIS feature ID: 0615025

Duxbury is a census-designated place (CDP) in the town of Duxbury in Plymouth County, Massachusetts, United States. The population was 1,802 at the 2010 census.

== Geography ==
Duxbury is located at 42°2′34″N 70°40′22″W (42.042891, -70.672928).

According to the United States Census Bureau, the CDP has a total area of 6.8 km^{2} (2.6 sq mi), of which 5.6 km^{2} (2.2 sq mi) is land and 1.2 km^{2} (0.46 sq mi) (17.18%) is water.

== Demographics ==
Historical population
Census	Pop.	Note	%±
2020	1,896		—
U.S. Decennial Census

As of the census of 2000, there were 1,426 people, 499 households, and 415 families residing in the CDP. The population density was 253.7 people/km^{2} (657 people/mi^{2}). There were 567 housing units at an average density of 100.9 units/km^{2} (261 units/mi^{2}). The racial makeup of the CDP was 98.18% White, 0.07% Black or African American, 0.14% Native American, 0.84% Asian, 0.35% from other races, and 0.42% from two or more races. Hispanic or Latino of any race were 0.70% of the population.

There were 499 households, out of which 40.7% had children under the age of 18 living with them, 78.4% were married couples living together, 4.4% had a female householder with no husband present, and 16.8% were non-families. 14.4% of all households were made up of individuals, and 6.0% had someone living alone who was 65 years of age or older. The average household size was 2.86 and the average family size was 3.19.

In the CDP, the population was spread out, with 29.4% under the age of 18, 3.9% from 18 to 24, 20.9% from 25 to 44, 33.1% from 45 to 64, and 12.7% who were 65 years of age or older. The median age was 42 years. For every 100 females, there were 97.0 males. For every 100 females age 18 and over, there were 91.4 males.

The median income for a household in the CDP was $105,683, and the median income for a family was $125,346. Males had a median income of $85,783 versus $45,417 for females. The per capita income for the CDP was $44,589. About 1.6% of families and 2.6% of the population were below the poverty line, including 3.7% of those under age 18 and 5.3% of those age 65 or over.
