= Kingston (CDP), Massachusetts =

Kingston, Massachusetts
- Census-designated place
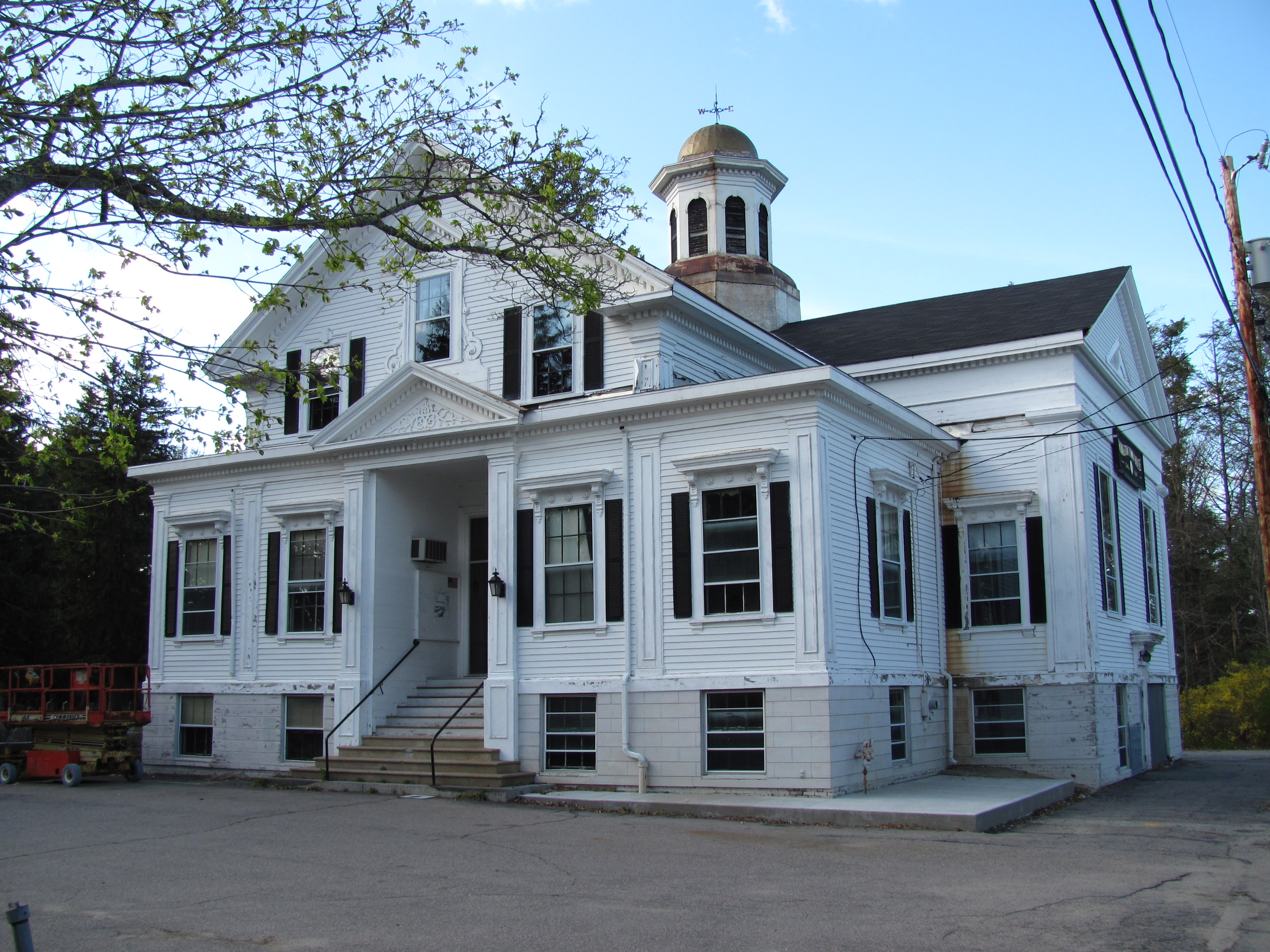
- Kingston Town House

- Location in Plymouth County in Massachusetts
- Coordinates: 41°59′33″N 70°43′2″W
- Country: United States
- State: Massachusetts
- County: Plymouth

Area
  - Total: 6.28 sq mi (16.27 km^{2})
  - Land: 4.81 sq mi (12.46 km^{2})
  - Water: 1.47 sq mi (3.81 km^{2})
- Elevation: 59 ft (18 m)

Population (2020)
  - Total: 5,700
  - Density: 1,184.7/sq mi (457.41/km^{2})
- Time zone: UTC-5 (Eastern (EST))
  - Summer (DST): UTC-4 (EDT)
- ZIP code: 02364
- Area code: 781
- FIPS code: 25-33185
- GNIS feature ID: 0615167

Kingston is a census-designated place (CDP) in the town of Kingston in Plymouth County, Massachusetts, United States. The population was 5,591 at the 2010 census.

== Geography ==
Kingston is located at 41°59′32″N 70°43′2″W (41.992453, -70.717325).

According to the United States Census Bureau, the CDP has a total area of 16.3 km^{2} (6.3 sq mi), of which 12.5 km^{2} (4.8 sq mi) is land and 3.8 km^{2} (1.5 sq mi) (23.53%) is water.

== Demographics ==
Historical population
| Census | Pop. | Note | %± |
|---|---|---|---|
| 2020 | 5,700 | | — |
U.S. Decennial Census

As of the census of 2000, there were 5,380 people, 2,145 households, and 1,473 families residing in the CDP. The population density was 431.9 people/km^{2} (1,119 people/mi^{2}). There were 2,350 housing units at an average density of 188.6 units/km^{2} (488 units/mi^{2}). The racial makeup of the CDP was 96.51% White, 1.36% Black or African American, 0.17% Native American, 0.56% Asian, 0.61% from other races, and 0.80% from two or more races. Hispanic or Latino of any race were 0.48% of the population.

There were 2,145 households, out of which 33.0% had children under the age of 18 living with them, 54.0% were married couples living together, 11.3% had a female householder with no husband present, and 31.3% were non-families. 26.1% of all households were made up of individuals, and 10.5% had someone living alone who was 65 years of age or older. The average household size was 2.49 and the average family size was 3.02.

In the CDP, the population was spread out, with 24.3% under the age of 18, 6.5% from 18 to 24, 32.2% from 25 to 44, 23.9% from 45 to 64, and 13.1% who were 65 years of age or older. The median age was 37 years. For every 100 females, there were 92.2 males. For every 100 females age 18 and over, there were 89.0 males.

The median income for a household in the CDP was $48,607, and the median income for a family was $57,723. Males had a median income of $40,151 versus $26,957 for females. The per capita income for the CDP was $22,425. About 4.6% of families and 4.8% of the population were below the poverty line, including 4.9% of those under age 18 and 7.0% of those age 65 or over.
