= Chincoteague =

Chincoteague may refer to:

== Geography in the United States ==
- Chincoteague Bay, a bay on the coast of Maryland and Virginia
- Chincoteague Channel, a channel in Virginia connecting Chincoteague Bay and Chincoteague Inlet
- Chincoteague Inlet, an inlet on the coast of Virginia
- Chincoteague, Virginia, a town in Virginia
- Chincoteague National Wildlife Refuge, a wildlife refuge on the Virginia portion of Assateague Island

== Ships ==
- USCGC Chincoteague, the name of more than one United States Coast Guard ship
- USS Chincoteague (AVP-24), a United States Navy seaplane tender in commission from 1943 to 1946

== Other ==
- Chincoteague (crater), impact crater in the Cebrenia quadrangle of Mars
- Chincoteague Fire Department, a historic building in Chincoteague, Virginia
- Chincoteague High School, a public high school in Accomack County, Virginia
- Chincoteague Island Library, an historic building in Chincoteague, Virginia
- Chincoteague Pony, breed of wild pony living on Assateague Island in Maryland and Virginia
