= Swing bridge =

Bridge that rotates horizontally around a vertical axis

- Span range: Short
- Material: Steel
- Movable: Yes
- Design effort: Medium
- Falsework required: No

A swing bridge (or swing span bridge) is a movable bridge that can be rotated horizontally around a vertical axis. It has as its primary structural support a vertical locating pin and support ring, usually at or near to its center of gravity, about which the swing span (turning span) can then pivot horizontally as shown in the animated illustration to the right.

In its closed position, a swing bridge carrying a road or railway over a river or canal, for example, allows traffic to cross. When a water vessel needs to pass the bridge, road traffic is stopped (usually by traffic signals and barriers), and then motors rotate the bridge horizontally about its pivot point. The typical swing bridge will rotate approximately 90 degrees, or one-quarter turn; however, a bridge which intersects the navigation channel at an oblique angle may be built to rotate only 45 degrees, or one-eighth turn, in order to clear the channel. Small swing bridges as found over narrow canals may be pivoted only at one end, opening as would a gate, but require substantial underground structure to support the pivot.

== Advantages ==
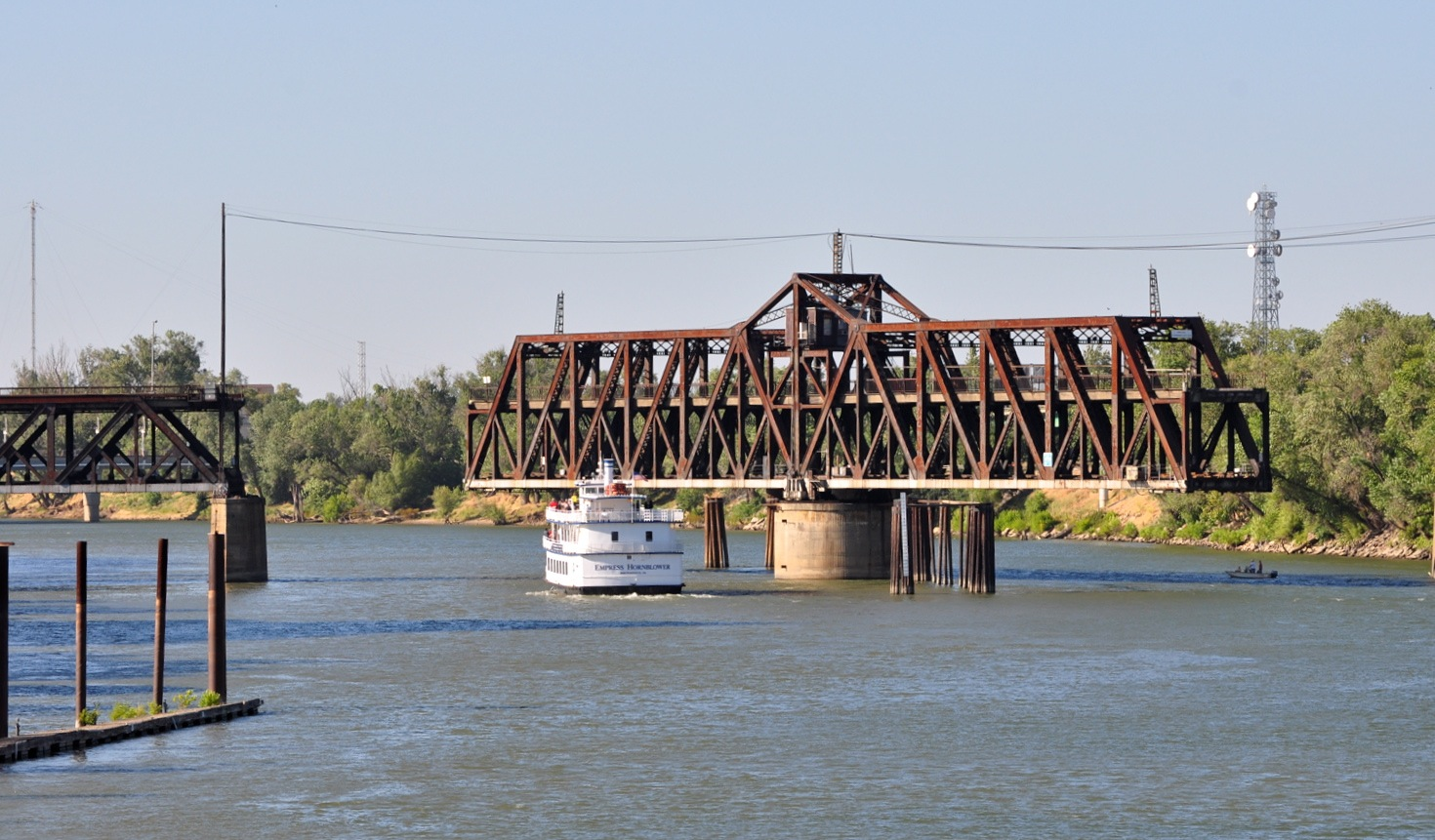
I Street swing Bridge span turned to allow a boat to pass Sacramento, California

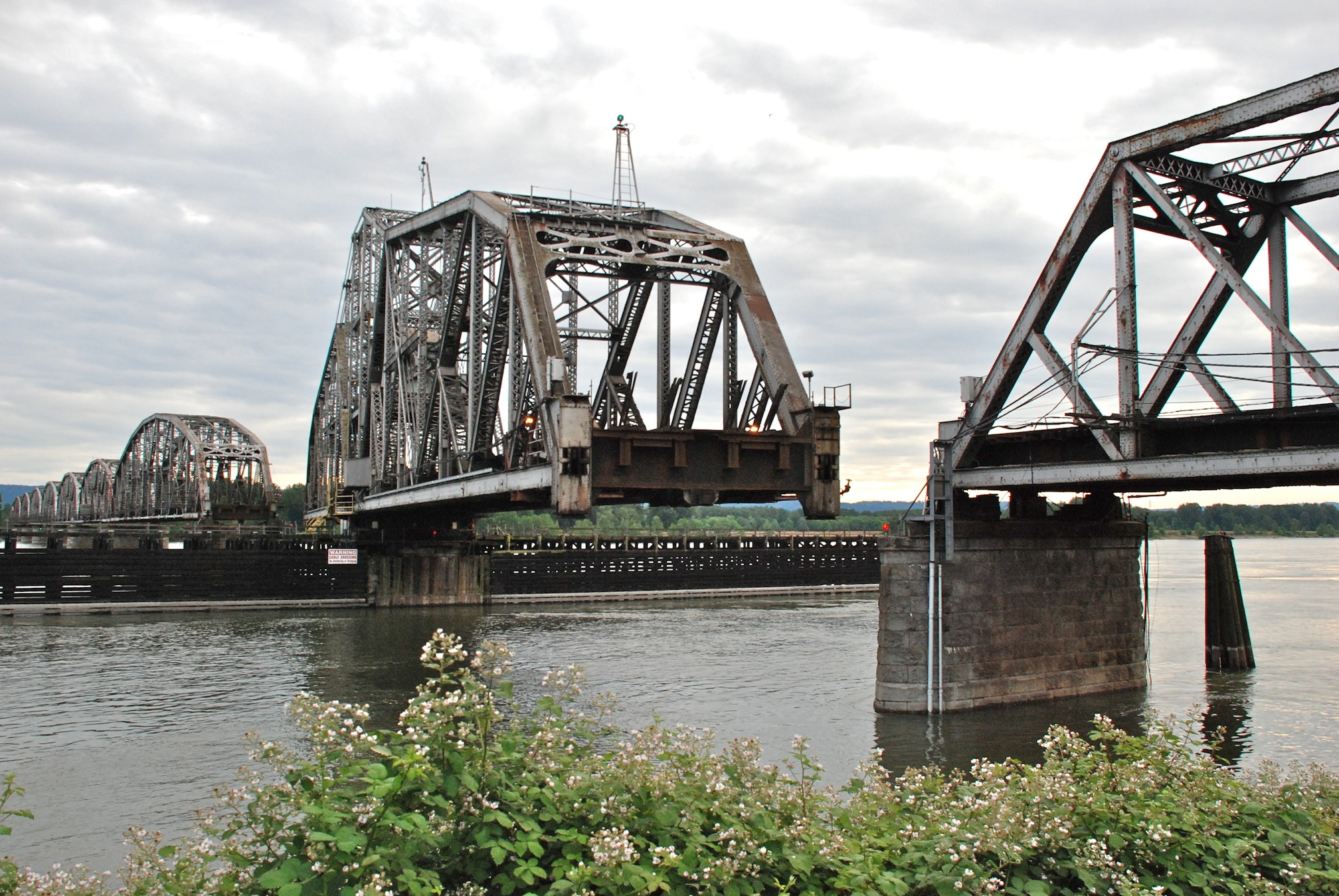
BNSF Railroad Bridge 9.6 across the Columbia River in Portland, Oregon, showing the swing-span section turning

- As this type requires no counterweights, the complete weight is significantly reduced as compared to other moveable bridges.
- Where the channel is wide enough for separate traffic directions on each side, the likelihood of vessel-to-vessel collisions is reduced.
- The central support is often mounted upon a berm along the axis of the watercourse, intended to protect the bridge from watercraft collisions when it is opened. This artificial island forms an excellent construction area for building the moveable span, as the construction will not impede traffic.

== Disadvantages ==
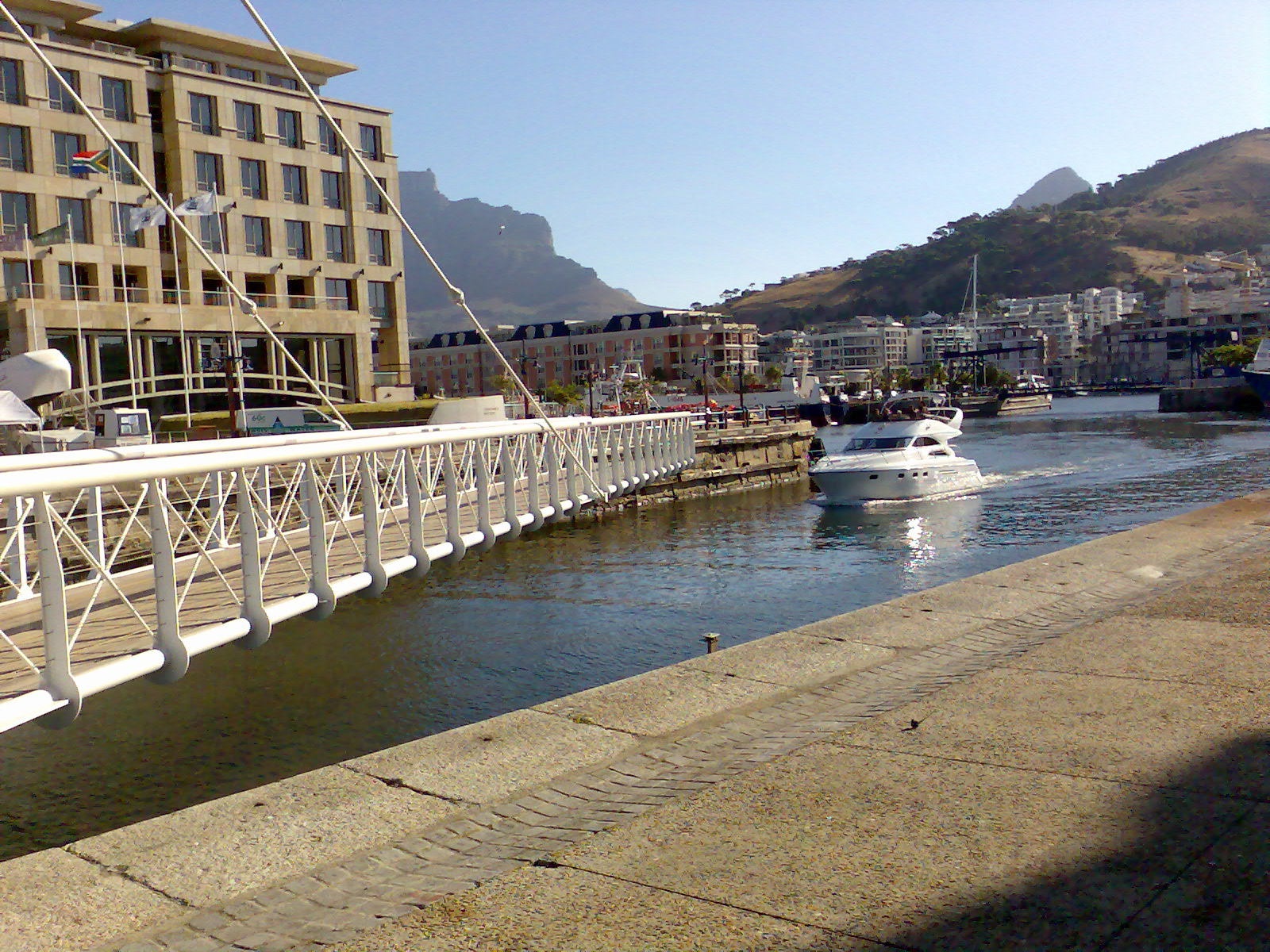
An example of how small swing bridges like this one may be pivoted only at one end, but that does require substantial underground structure to support the pivot. Victoria & Alfred Waterfront, Cape Town.

- In a symmetrical bridge, the central pier forms a hazard to navigation. Asymmetrical bridges may place the pivot near one side of the channel.
- Where a wide channel is not available, a large portion of the bridge may be over an area that would be easily spanned by other means.
- A wide channel will be reduced by the center pivot and foundation.
- When open, the bridge will have to maintain its own weight as a balanced double cantilever, while when closed and in use for traffic, the live loads will be distributed as in a pair of conventional truss bridges, which may require additional stiffness in some members whose loading will be alternately in compression and tension.
- If struck from the water near the edge of the span, it may rotate enough to cause safety problems (see Big Bayou Canot rail accident).

== Examples ==
Government Bridge across the Mississippi has a swing section for river traffic traversing Lock and Dam 15.

=== Albania ===
- Buna river Bridge, in Shkodra, Albania.

=== Argentina ===
- Puente de la Mujer, an asymmetrical cable-stayed span.

=== Australia ===
- Gladesville Bridge, Sydney. Opened 1881, closed 1964 and demolished; had a small swing span on the southern end.
- Pyrmont Bridge, Sydney. Opened 1902. Closed to traffic 1988. Still in use as a pedestrian bridge.
- Glebe Island Bridge, Sydney. Opened 1903. Tramway defunct. Closed to traffic, 1995; supplanted by Anzac Bridge. Still in existence.
- Hay Bridge, Hay, New South Wales. Opened 1873, demolished 1973. Replaced by a fixed concrete bridge.
- Victoria Bridge, Townsville, Queensland. Opened 1889, closed to traffic 1975. Still in use as a foot bridge.
- Sale Swing Bridge, Sale, Victoria. Opened 1883. Closed to traffic in 2002. Restored to full working order in 2006.
- Dunalley Bridge, Dunalley, Tasmania. Still in use.

=== Belgium ===
- Verbindingsbrug, Zeebrugge. Opened in May 2022. With a length of 130 metres and a passage width of 55 metres, it is the longest swing bridge in Europe.
- Wiedauwkaaibrug (nl), Ghent. It allows railway lines 58 and 55 (nl) to cross the Ghent–Terneuzen Canal. The current iteration of the bridge was built in 2008.

=== Belize ===
- Belize City Swing Bridge, Belize City, Belize. Oldest such bridge in Central America and one of the few manually operated swing bridges in the world still in operation. (Restored in the 2000s)

=== Canada ===
Bridge Name	Waterway	Co-ordinates	Status	Comments
Cambie Street Bridge Connaught Bridge	False Creek, Vancouver, British Columbia	49°16′19″N 123°6′54″W	Demolished/replaced (1985), formerly vehicle, pedestrian & streetcar traffic	Short documentary "Swingspan" tells the history of the bridge and its demolition.
Canso Canal Bridge	Canso Canal, Nova Scotia	45°38′50″N 61°24′45″W	Still swings, Vehicle/Rail Traffic	Links Nova Scotia mainland with Cape Breton Island with 2 traffic lanes of Highway 104 (the Trans-Canada Highway) as well as a single track railway line operated by the Cape Breton and Central Nova Scotia Railway (CBNS).
CNR Bridge	Fraser River, British Columbia	49°11′50″N 122°55′24″W	Still swings, Rail Traffic	Between Queensborough in New Westminster, British Columbia and the mainland
Derwent Way Bridge	Fraser River, British Columbia	49°11′09″N 122°55′55″W	Still swings, Vehicle/Rail Traffic	Between Queensborough in New Westminster, British Columbia and Annacis Island in Delta, British Columbia
Fredericton Railway Bridge	Fredericton, New Brunswick	45°57′25″N 66°37′43″W	No longer swings, pedestrian traffic.	Constructed in 1887 and opened 1889. Last train on the bridge was in 1996.
Grand Narrows Bridge	Barra Strait, Bras d'Or Lake, Nova Scotia	45°57′35.75″N 60°48′1.03″W	Was last opened for marine traffic on 30 December 2014 remaining open for marine traffic since that date, no longer swings, Rail Traffic cannot cross.	Carrying the Cape Breton and Central Nova Scotia Railway (CBNS).
Hog's Back Bridge	Rideau Canal, Ottawa, Ontario	45°22′11″N 75°41′54″W	Still swings, Vehicle Traffic	This bridge swings from one end. There is an adjacent fixed bridge over Hog's Back Falls
Iron Bridge	Third Welland Canal, Thorold, Ontario	43°08′15″N 79°10′38″W	No longer swings, Rail Traffic	Carrying the CNR Grimsby Subdivision over the third Welland Canal.
Kaministiquia River Swing Bridge	Kaministiquia River, Thunder Bay, Ontario	48°21′31″N 89°17′15″W	No longer swings. Road and rail traffic only. Currently closed due to 29 October 2013 fire	Built in 1908 by Grand Trunk Railway; currently owned by the CNR
Little Current Swing Bridge	North Channel, Little Current, Ontario	45°58′48″N 81°54′50″W	Still swings, Vehicle Traffic (formerly rail)	Built by Algoma Eastern Railway, 1913
Montrose Swing Bridge	Welland River, Niagara Falls, Ontario	43°02′45″N 79°07′11″W	No longer swings, Rail Traffic	Formerly Canada Southern Railway, now CPR
Moray Bridge	Middle Arm of the Fraser River, Richmond, British Columbia	49°11′30″N 123°08′13″W	Still swings; Eastbound Vehicle Traffic	Connects Sea Island, Richmond, BC (location of Vancouver International Airport) to Lulu Island, Richmond, BC
New Westminster Bridge	Fraser River, British Columbia	49°12′29″N 122°53′38″W	Still swings, Rail Traffic, formerly had 2nd deck for vehicles	Between New Westminster and Surrey.
Pitt River Bridge	Pitt River, British Columbia	49°14′52″N 122°43′44″W	No longer swings, Vehicle Traffic	Twin side-by-side bridges connecting Port Coquitlam, British Columbia to Pitt Meadows, British Columbia
Pitt River Railway Bridge	Pitt River, British Columbia	49°14′42″N 122°44′01″W	Still swings – Rail Traffic	(Please Contribute)
Wasauksing (Rose Point) Swing Bridge	South Channel, Georgian Bay, near Parry Sound, Ontario	45°18′54″N 80°2′40″W	Still swings, Vehicle Traffic (formerly rail)	Links Wasauksing First Nation (Parry Island) to the mainland at Rose Point
Welland Canal, Bridge 15	Welland Recreational Waterway, Welland, Ontario	42°58′37″N 79°15′21″W	No longer swings, Rail Traffic	Built by Canada Southern Railway, c. 1910. Now operated by Trillium Railway
Welland Canal, Bridge 20 Approach Span	2nd and 3rd Welland Canal, Port Colborne, Ontario	42°53′14″N 79°14′58″W	No longer swings, Abandoned (formerly rail)	Abandoned 1998 when adjacent Vertical-lift bridge was dismantled.
Bergen Cut-off Bridge	Red River, Winnipeg, Manitoba	49°56′49″N 97°5′53″W	Centre span permanently in open position, allowing unrestricted river traffic	Decommissioned CPR railway bridge (last used in 1946); Superstructure built by Dominion Bridge Co. 1913–1914
Pont CN-Du port	Lachine Canal, Montreal, Quebec	45°29′24.9″N 73°33′26.1″W	No longer swings.	Abandoned CN railway swing bridge in the middle of Lachine Canal. Constructed in 1912 by the Dominion Bridge Company for the Grand Trunk Railway company. The pivot system and the cockpit are still in place, but the bridge has not been operational since the late 1960s.

=== China ===
- Jintang Bridge (Tianjin), across Hai River in Tianjin

=== Denmark ===
- Lille Langebro, a cycling and pedestrian double swing bridge crossing the inner harbour at Copenhagen.
- Cirkelbroen ('The Circle Bridge'), a cycling and pedestrian bridge spanning the southern mouth of Christianshavn Canal in the Christianshavn area of central Copenhagen.
- Naestved Svingbro, Horizontal clearance 42.0m. Carries a 14m-wide trunk road over the Naestved Canal.
- Odin's Bridge, a double swing bridge crossing Odense Canal, with a horizontal span of almost 200 meters.

=== Egypt ===
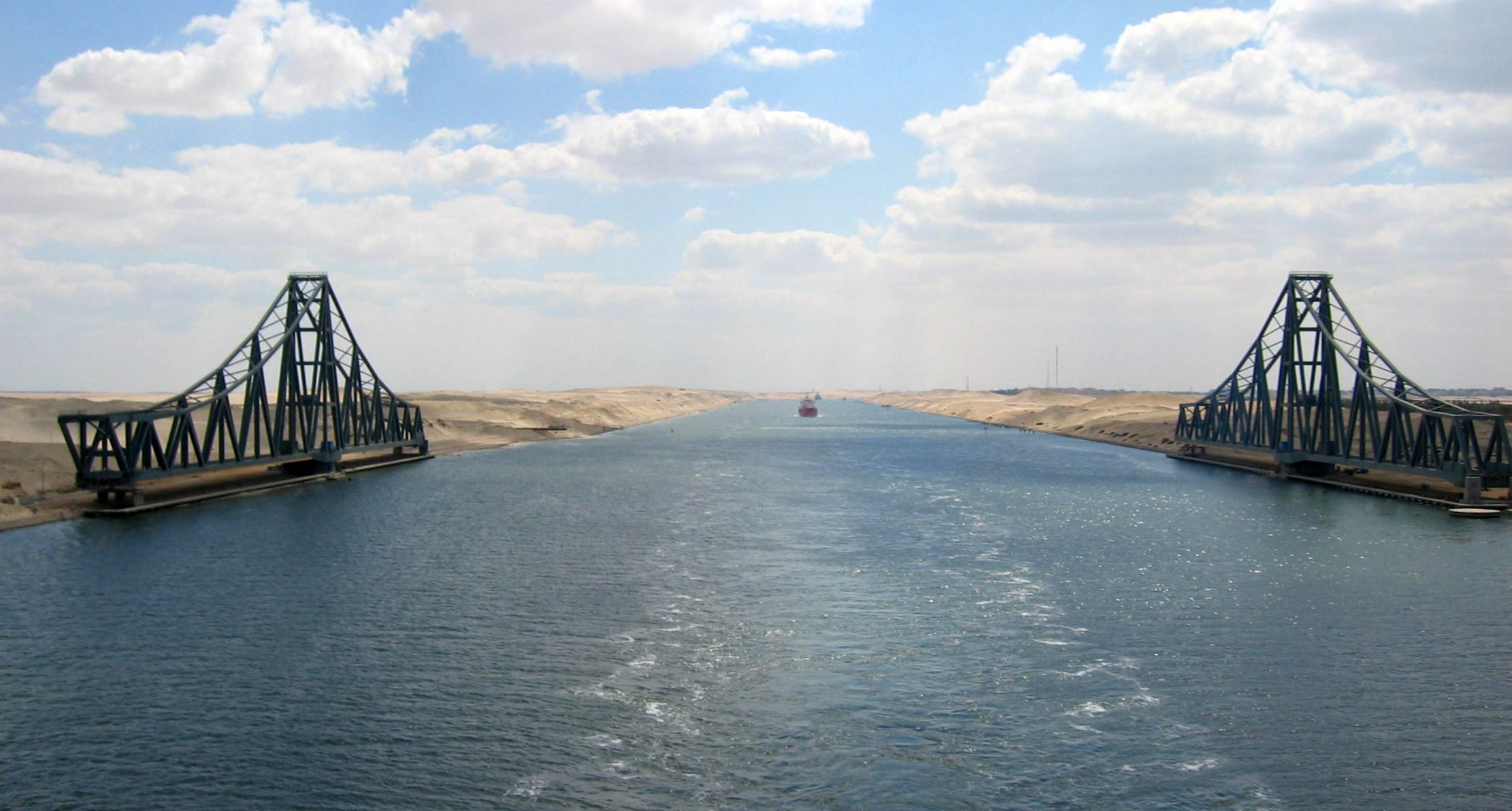
El Ferdan Railway Bridge in Egypt; the longest swing bridge in the world, runs from the east of the Suez Canal to the west into Sinai. It is left open most of the time to allow sailing ships to pass in the canal, only closing during the passage of trains.

- The longest swing bridge span is 340 metres, by the El Ferdan Railway Bridge across the Suez Canal.

=== Estonia ===
- The Admiral Bridge (Admiralisild) is a pedestrian bridge in Tallinn, Estonia, connecting two parts of the Old City Harbour. It allows access to the Admiralty Pool (Admiraliteedi bassein) for yachts. It became the first swing bridge in Estonia in 2021.

=== France ===
- Le pont tournant rue Dieu, across the Canal Saint-Martin in Paris, is a distinctive location in the 1938 film Hôtel du Nord, and is featured in the opening shot of the film.

=== Germany ===
- Kaiser-Wilhelm-Brücke in Wilhelmshaven, built in 1907, with a length of 159m, it was once Europe's biggest swing bridge.

=== India ===
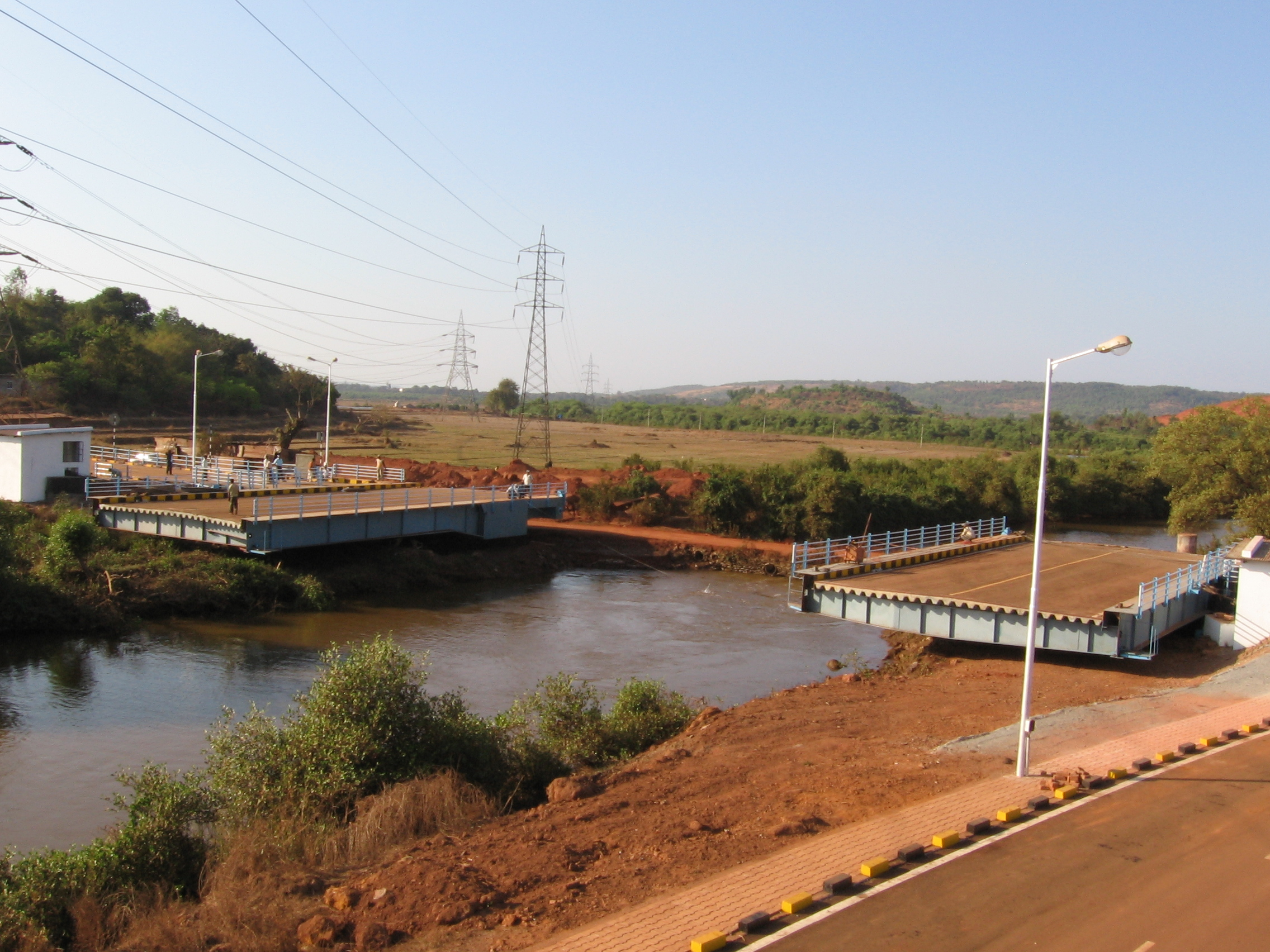
Poira-Corjuem Bridge, Goa

- Garden Reach Road Swing Bridge, for Calcutta Port, Kidderpore, Kolkata
- Poira-Corjuem Bridge, for GSIDC, Corjuem, Goa by Rajdeep Buildcon Pvt. Ltd.

=== Ireland ===
- Samuel Beckett Bridge, Dublin
- Seán O'Casey Bridge, Dublin
- Michael Davitt Bridge, County Mayo
- Portumna bridge, between County Galway and County Tipperary

=== Italy ===
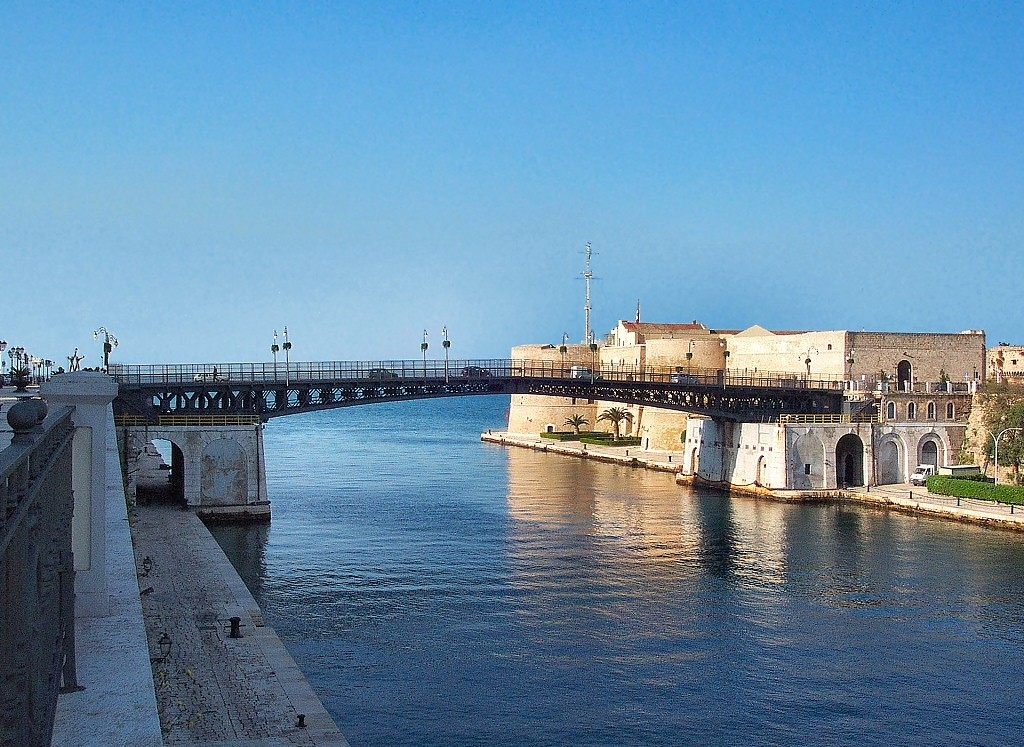
The Ponte Girevole San Francesco di Paola in Taranto

- Ponte Girevole, Taranto (built in 1958, after an 1887 one of similar design but using different materials) – a very unusual type, with two spans that separate at the bridge's center and pivot sideways from the bridge's outer ends.

=== Latvia ===
- Kalpaka Tilts, Liepāja, connecting the city with the former Russian/Soviet port Karosta.

=== Lithuania ===
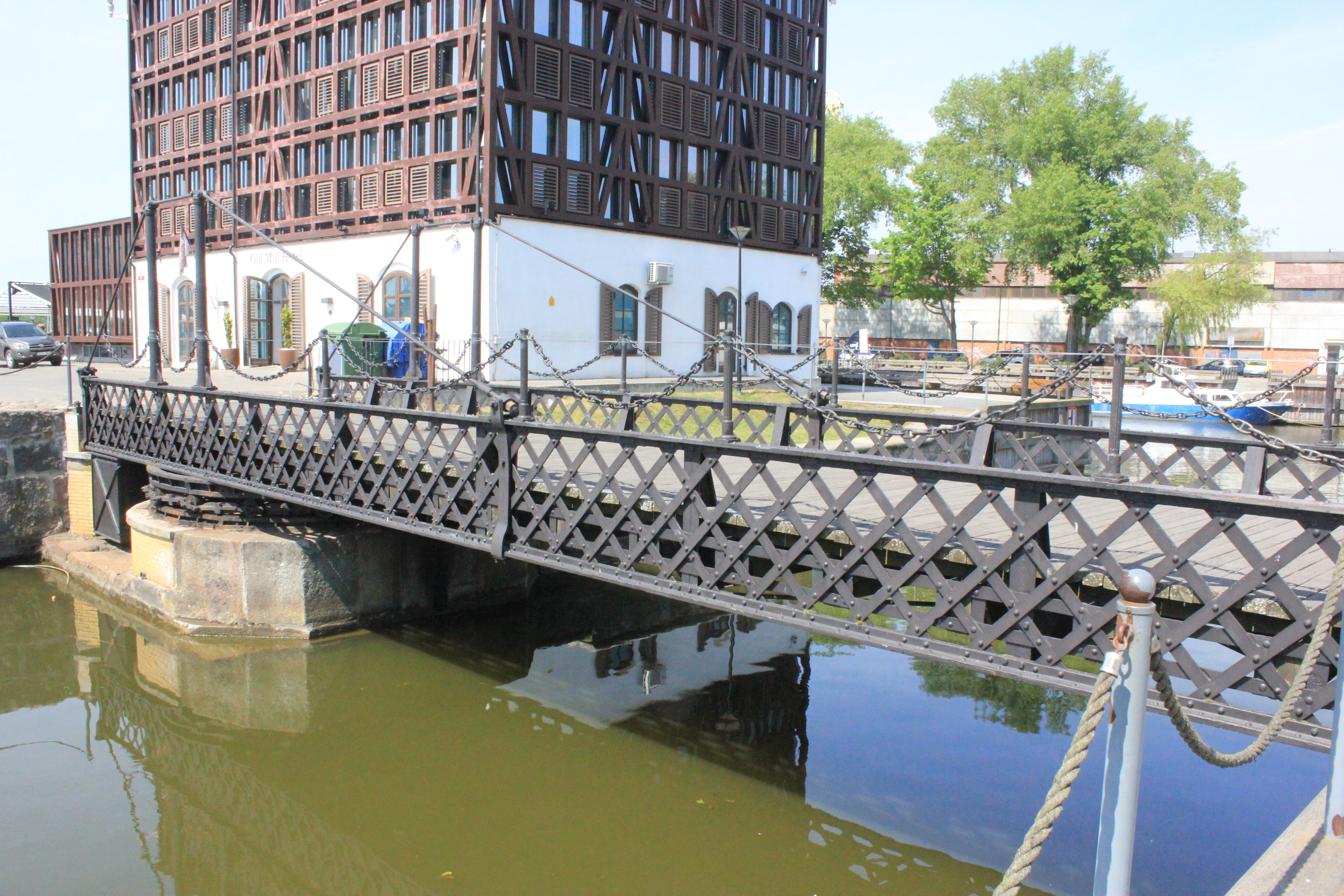
Chain Bridge, Klaipeda

- Chain Bridge, Klaipeda. Built in 1855 and still working today, this is the only swing bridge in Lithuania. When the bridge is turned, boats and yachts can enter the Castle port. Rotation of the bridge is manual; two people can rotate the bridge.

=== The Netherlands ===
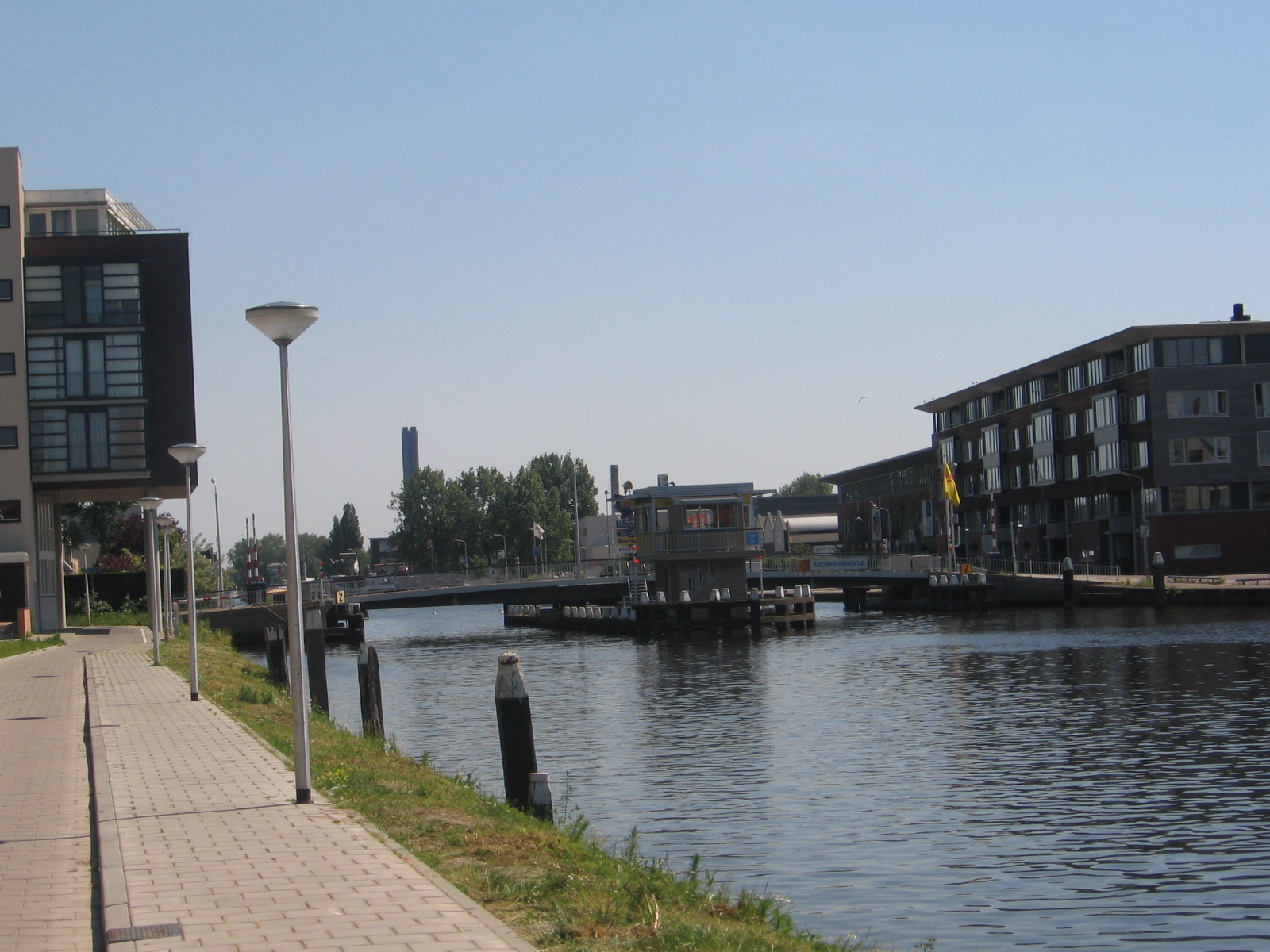
The "Abtswoudsebrug", a swing bridge for bikers and pedestrians built in 1979

- The "Abtsewoudsebrug" in Delft, close to the Technische Universiteit Delft, is a bridge of this type. 52°0′5.71″N 4°21′50.10″E
- There are four bridges of this type in use on the Afsluitdijk (Enclosure dam). They span the waterways that link the shipping lock complexes to the Wadden Sea.
- There is another one on the channel between Ghent (Belgium) and Terneuzen (The Netherlands) at Sas Van Gent.

Many inner cities have swing bridges, since these require less street space than other types of bridges.

=== New Zealand ===
- Kopu Bridge, Waihou River, near Thames, New Zealand
- Tamaki River Swing Bridge (also known as 1st Panmure Bridge), Tāmaki River, near Panmure, New Zealand
- Kotuitui Whitinga Bridge (pedestrian bridge), Waiarohia Stream, Whangārei, New Zealand

(A "swing bridge" in New Zealand refers to a flexible walking track bridge which "swings" as one walks across.)

=== Panama ===
- A swing bridge at the Gatun Locks provides the only road passage over the Atlantic side of the Panama Canal. This is a small bridge that swings out from each side. Another larger swing bridge at the Miraflores Locks is on the Pacific side but is rarely used, having been supplanted by the Bridge of the Americas and the Centennial Bridge.

=== Poland ===
- A swing bridge at the Giżycko is one of four bridges that cross over the Luczanski Channel. It is one of ten (four still in operation) swing bridges in Poland.
- A swing bridge in Ustka, which crosses the Słupia River, and is walkable every 20 minutes.
- A swing bridge in Wolin, which crosses the Dziwna River.

=== South Africa ===
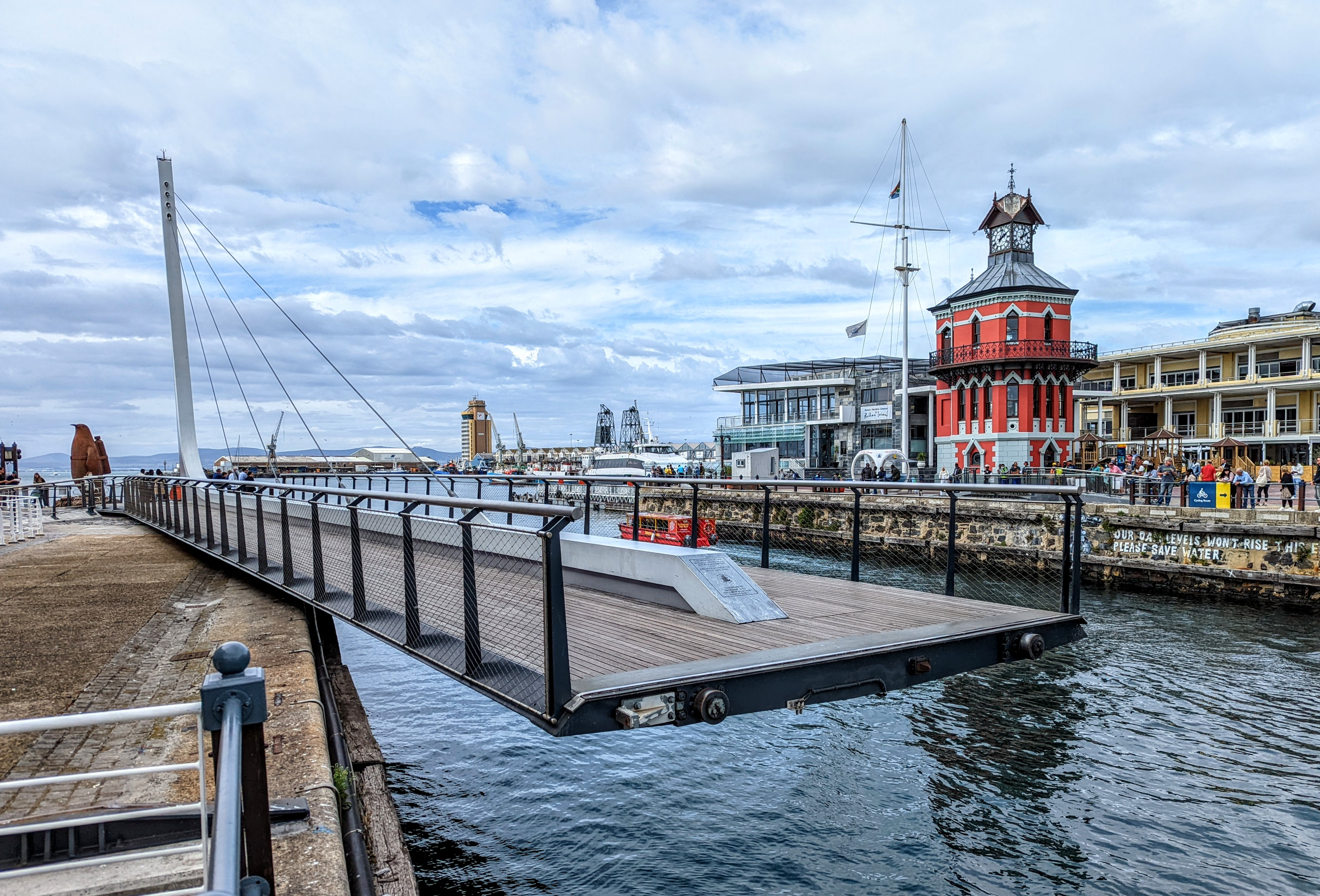
The Clocktower Bridge, in Cape Town, starting to close behind a small boat

- The Clocktower Bridge is a pedestrian swing bridge at the Victoria and Alfred Waterfront in Cape Town.

=== Taiwan ===
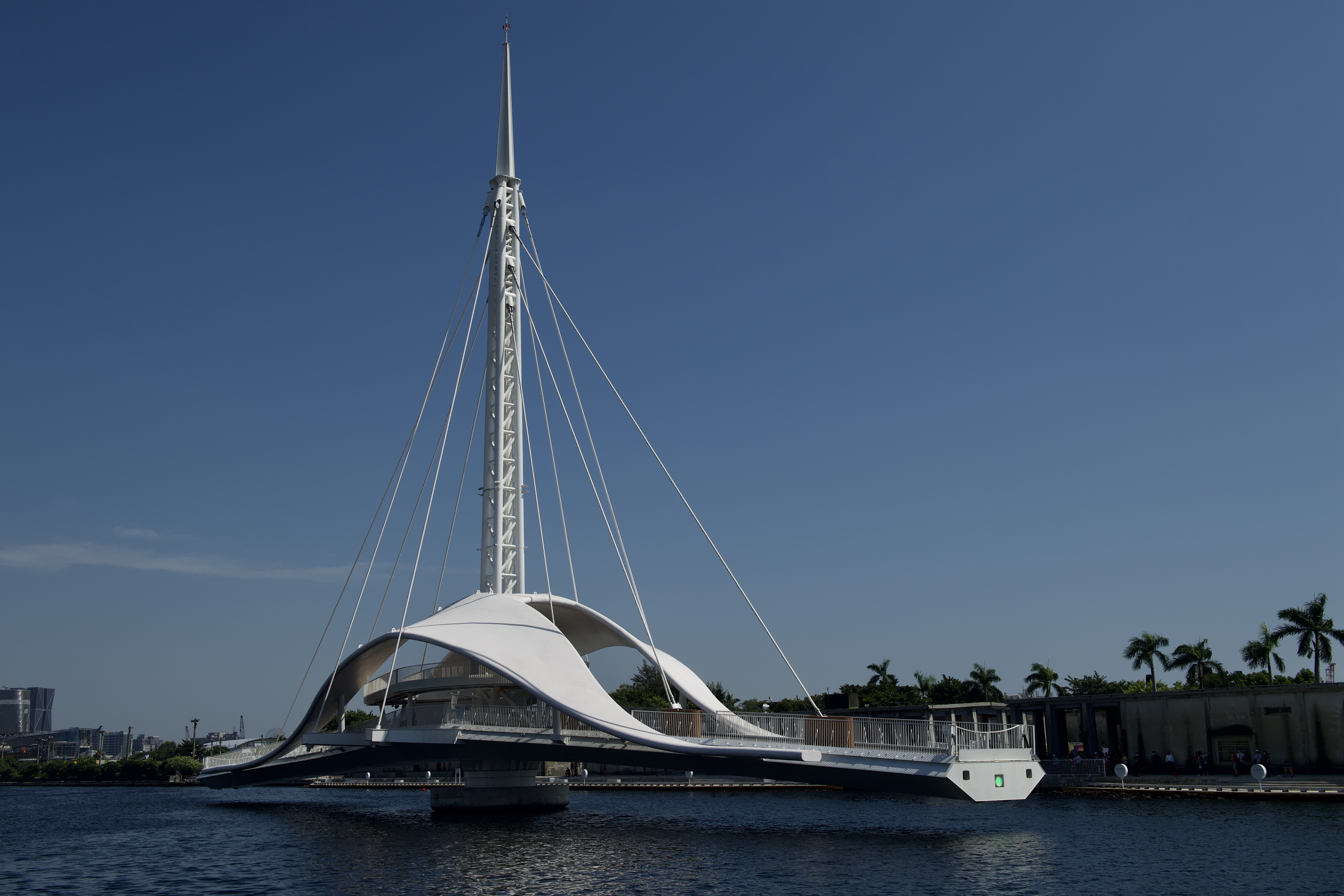
Great Harbor Bridge in Kaohsiung during its rotation

- Great Harbor Bridge in Kaohsiung is the longest cross-port rotating bridge in Asia.

=== Ukraine ===
- Varvarivskyi Bridge over the Southern Bug in Mykolaiv, with Europe's longest span (134 m)

=== United Kingdom ===
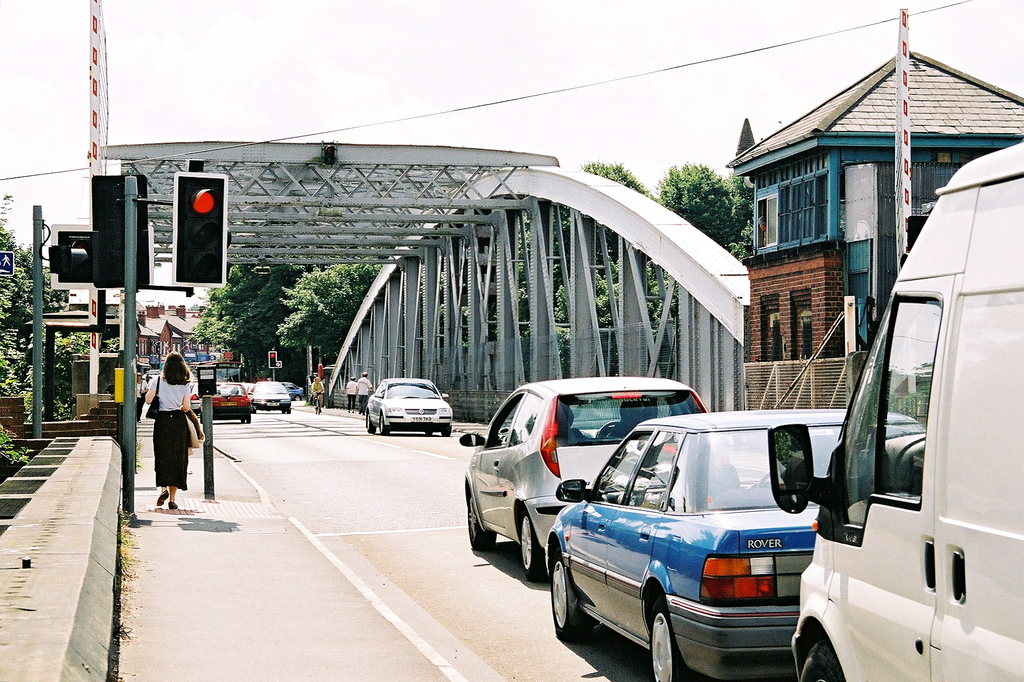
Traffic crossing the Northwich Road swing bridge on the Manchester Ship Canal at Stockton Heath, Warrington

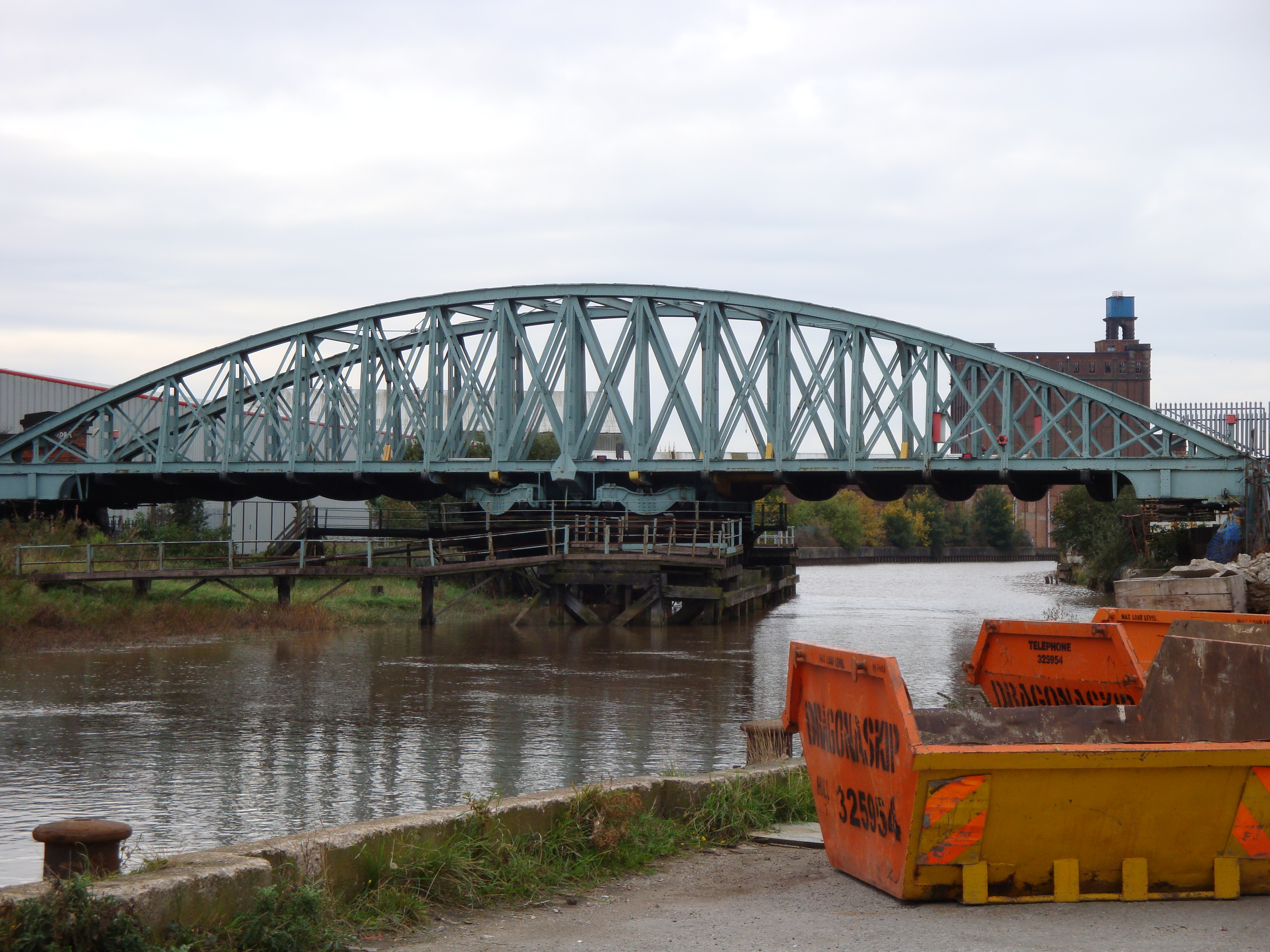
Hull Docks branch bridge

In the UK, there is a legal definition in current statute as to what is or is not a 'swing bridge'.

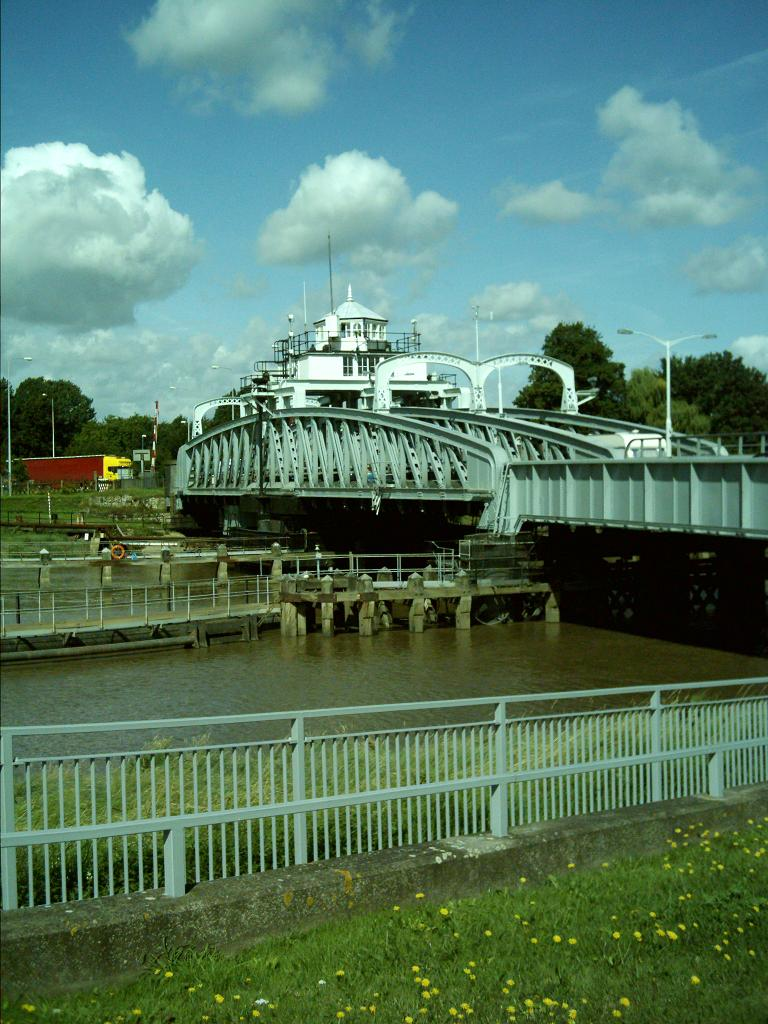
Cross Keys Bridge in Sutton Bridge, which carries the A17 over the River Nene in Lincolnshire close to the border with Norfolk

- Acton swing bridge – road
- Barmouth Bridge – rail
- Beccles swing bridge – rail
- Bell's Bridge, Glasgow – pedestrian
- Bethells Swing Bridge
- Boothferry swing bridge at Boothferry, Yorkshire
- Caernarfon swing bridge
- Connaught Crossing in London Docklands, built as a low-rising swing bridge to allow marine traffic in the Royal Docks to pass at a place when the proximity of London City Airport meant a higher fixed bridge was not practicable.
- Cross Keys Bridge in Sutton Bridge – carries the A17 road over the River Nene in Lincolnshire
- Folkestone Harbour railway station – railway bridge on the branch line.
- Foxton Swingbridge - road bridge over the Harborough arm of the Grand Union Canal in the village of Foxton.
- Goole railway swing bridge
- Glasson Dock swing bridge
- Govan–Partick Bridge, Glasgow – pedestrian
- Hawarden Railway Bridge – rail (now deactivated).
- Hull, England docks branch bridge – rail
- Kennet and Avon Canal at Tyle Mill Lock, Sulhamstead, Berkshire
- Kincardine Bridge – crossing the Firth of Forth from Falkirk council area to Kincardine-on-Forth, Fife (now deactivated).
- Leeds and Liverpool Canal Has a large number of swing bridges, especially between Bingley and Skipton and Burscough and Liverpool. Many are manually operated, carrying only farm tracks, but a significant number carry road traffic and are mechanised for boater operation.
- Manchester Ship Canal at Latchford, Stockton Heath and Lower Walton in Warrington, and also slightly further west at Moore. Near the eastern end of the canal in Salford, the Barton Road Swing Bridge is adjacent to the Barton Swing Aqueduct – a 234-foot, 800-ton trough holding some 800 tons of water (retained by gates at either end) swings so that it is at right angles to the Bridgewater Canal to allow ships to pass up the Ship Canal.
- Myton Swing Bridge - road bridge in Kingston upon Hull
- Oulton Broad swing bridge – rail
- Reedham Swing Bridge (52.55887°N 1.57237°E) – rail
- Renfrew Bridge, Glasgow - road
- Ross Bridge, Penzance
- Sandwich Toll Bridge (rebuilt 1892)
- Selby swing bridge – rail
- Somerleyton swing bridge
- Trowse Bridge at Norwich. Carries the electrified Great Eastern Main Line over the River Yare. It is the only overhead electrified swing bridge in the country.
- Tyne swing bridge at Newcastle Upon Tyne, which has an 85.7-metre cantilevered span with a central axis of rotation able to move through 90° to allow vessels to pass on either side of it.
- Whitby Swing Bridge over the River Esk at Whitby, North Yorkshire, with two swing leaves (though only one is usually opened).
- Yar Swing Bridge, Yarmouth, Isle of Wight
Operation of the Sulhamstead Tyle Mill swing bridge on the Kennet & Avon Canal

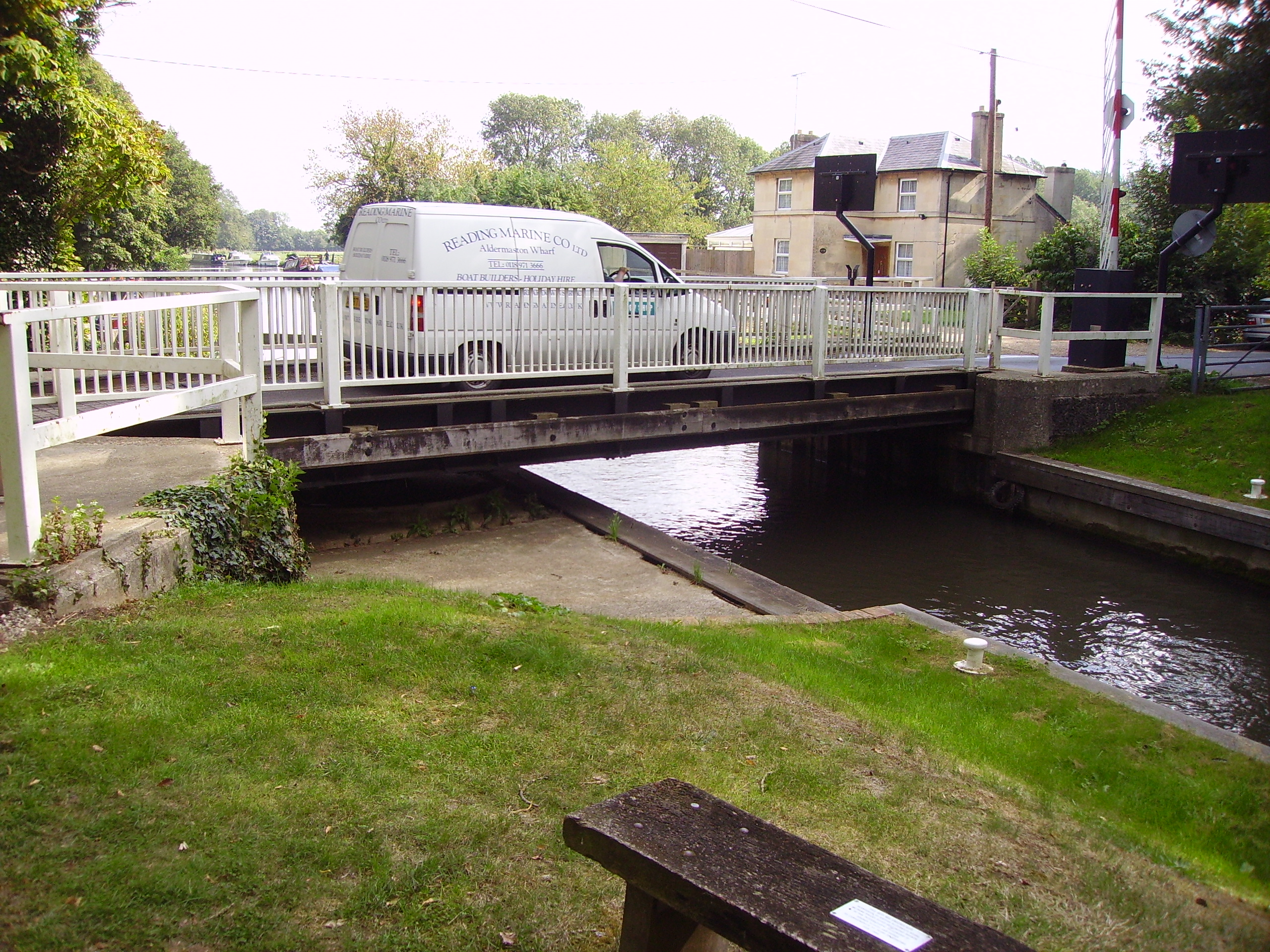
Bridge with road traffic

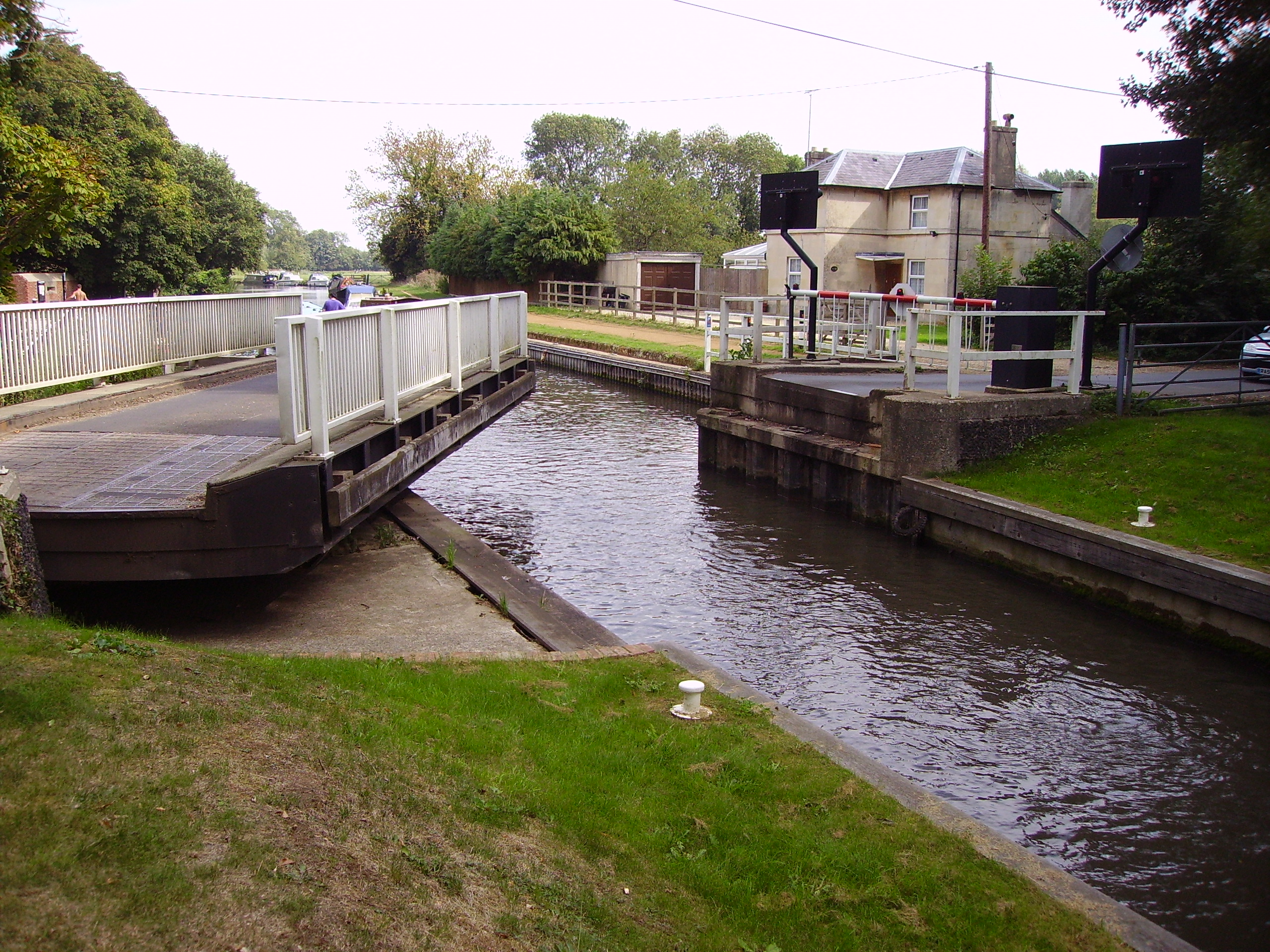
Bridge opening

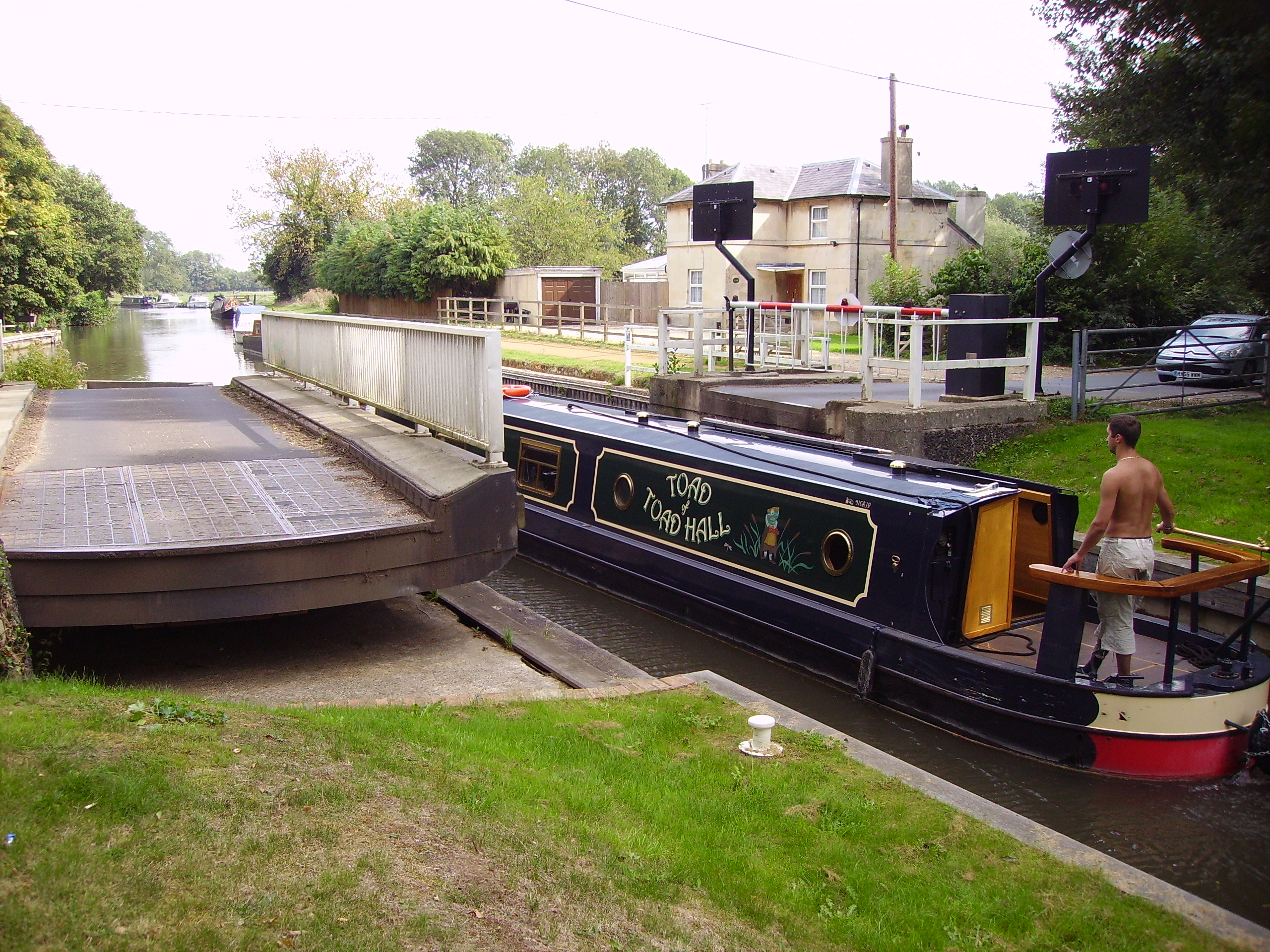
Bridge with canal traffic

=== United States ===
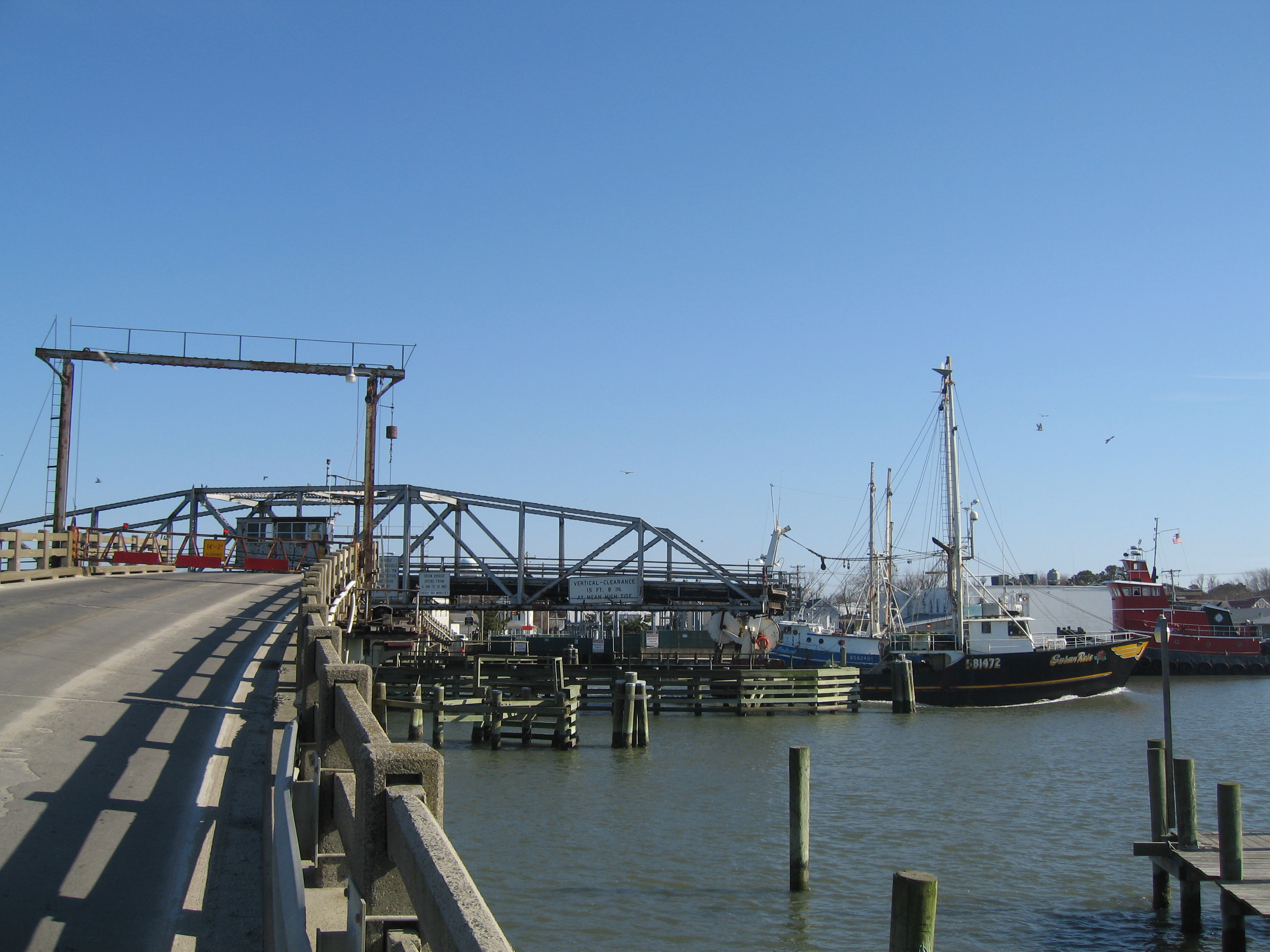
The former Chincoteague Channel Swing Bridge in Chincoteague, Virginia, now demolished

The largest double swing-span bridge in the United States is the 3,250 feet (990 m) long, 450 feet (140 m) navigable span, 60 feet (18 m) clearance George P. Coleman Memorial Bridge.

- CSXT Blackwater River bridge in Milton, Florida.
- Alanson Swing Bridge, billed as America's shortest swing bridge, crossing the Crooked River in Alanson, Michigan. The world's shortest are located in the United Kingdom over some of the narrowest canals in the world, for example on the Stroudwater Navigation, or, see Yar Swing Bridge above.
- Ben Sawyer Bridge, connecting the city of Mount Pleasant, South Carolina, with Sullivan's Island
- Berkley–Dighton Bridge (1896), connecting the towns of Berkley and Dighton, Massachusetts, crossing the Taunton River; removed in 2010. The replacement bridge is not a swing structure.
- Black Point Bridge carrying Northwestern Pacific Railroad over the Petaluma River at Black Point-Green Point, California
- Blackburn Point Road Bridge, over the Intracoastal Waterway in Osprey, Florida
- Bridge No. 4455, Central Avenue over Lewis Gut, Bridgeport, Connecticut (1924 steel swing bridge)
- Boca Grande Causeway, Built in 1958, this bridge is used for passage between Placida, FL to the island of Boca Grande. The original swing bridge was replaced by the current swing bridge in late 2015.
- Bridgeport Swing Bridge, Bridgeport, Alabama (demolished in the late 1970s, replaced with new span)
- Burlington Northern Railroad Bridge 9.6 (or BNSF Railway Bridge 9.6), crossing the Columbia River, from Portland, Oregon, to Vancouver, Washington, built in 1908.
- Center Street Bridge, Cleveland, Ohio (1901)
- Chef Menteur Bridge, near Slidell, Louisiana
- Chincoteague Channel Swing Bridge, Chincoteague, Virginia (demolished)
- Choptank River, modest swing bridge carrying former Baltimore & Eastern Railroad (PRR subsidiary) at Denton, Maryland (disused and isolated)
- Clinton Railroad Bridge crossing the Mississippi River, Clinton, Iowa
- Columbus Drive Bridge, Tampa, Florida, a bobtail swing bridge over the Hillsborough River
- CSX Rail Bridge, Indiantown, Florida
- Curtis Creek Rail Bridge, Baltimore, Maryland
- Deweyville Swing Bridge, crossing the Sabine River east of Deweyville, Texas
- Dubuque Rail Bridge, crossing the Mississippi River and connecting Dubuque, Iowa with East Dubuque, Illinois
- Dumbarton Rail Bridge, crossing San Francisco Bay in California (1910); since being decommissioned, the swing portion of the bridge has been welded open.
- East Haddam Bridge, Route 82 over the Connecticut River, East Haddam, Connecticut (1913)
- Fort Madison Toll Bridge, crossing the Mississippi River and connecting Fort Madison, Iowa with Niota, Illinois
- Fort Pike Bridge, near Slidell and New Orleans, Louisiana
- Fort Denaud Bridge, near LaBelle and Alva, Florida

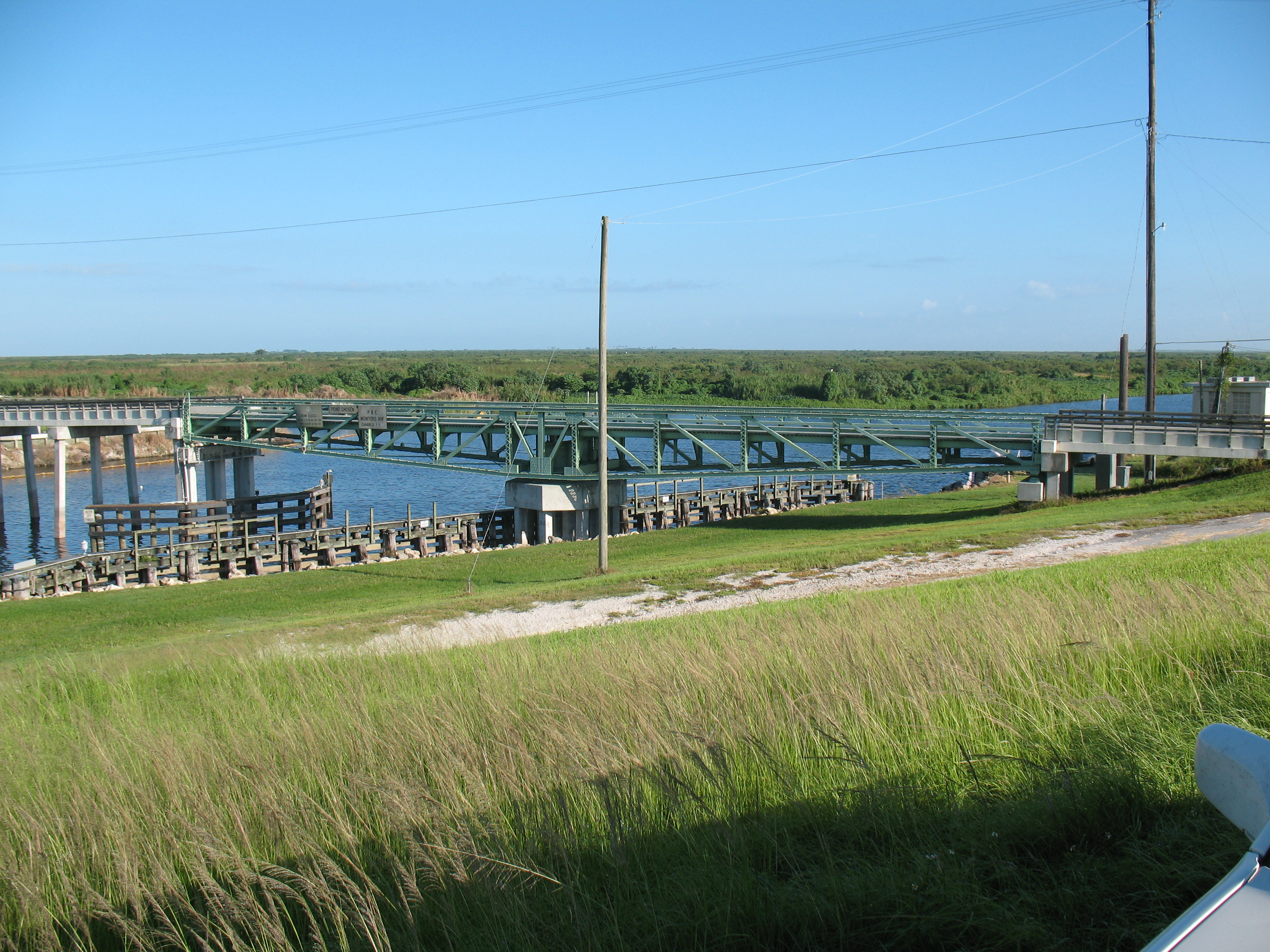
A swing bridge near Belle Glade, Florida

- Figure Eight Island Bridge, north of Wilmington, North Carolina
- Frederick Douglass Memorial Bridge, Washington, D.C.
- George P. Coleman Memorial Bridge, over the York River between Yorktown and Gloucester Point, Virginia
- Gianella Bridge, near Hamilton City California, connecting Glenn and Butte Counties over the Sacramento River, It was built in 1937 and demolished in 1987.
- Government Bridge on the Mississippi River between Davenport, Iowa and Rock Island, Illinois (1896)
- Grand Haven GTW RR Swing Bridge, connecting Grand Haven and Ferrysburg, Michigan
- Grand Rapids Swing Bridge, Grand Rapids, Michigan
- Grosse Ile Toll Bridge and nearby Wayne County Bridge, Grosse Ile, Michigan
- Hannibal Bridge (1869, demolished) and Second Hannibal Bridge (1917), Kansas City, Missouri, crossing the Missouri River
- Harlem River bridges in New York City, including from south to north:
  - Willis Avenue Bridge
  - Third Avenue Bridge
  - Madison Avenue Bridge
  - 145th Street Bridge
  - Macombs Dam Bridge
  - University Heights Bridge
  - Spuyten Duyvil Bridge
- Harmar Railroad Bridge, Marietta, Ohio
- Hodgdon Island Bridge, Boothbay, Maine. This is one of two manual swing bridges in Maine (see Songo Locks in Naples, Maine)

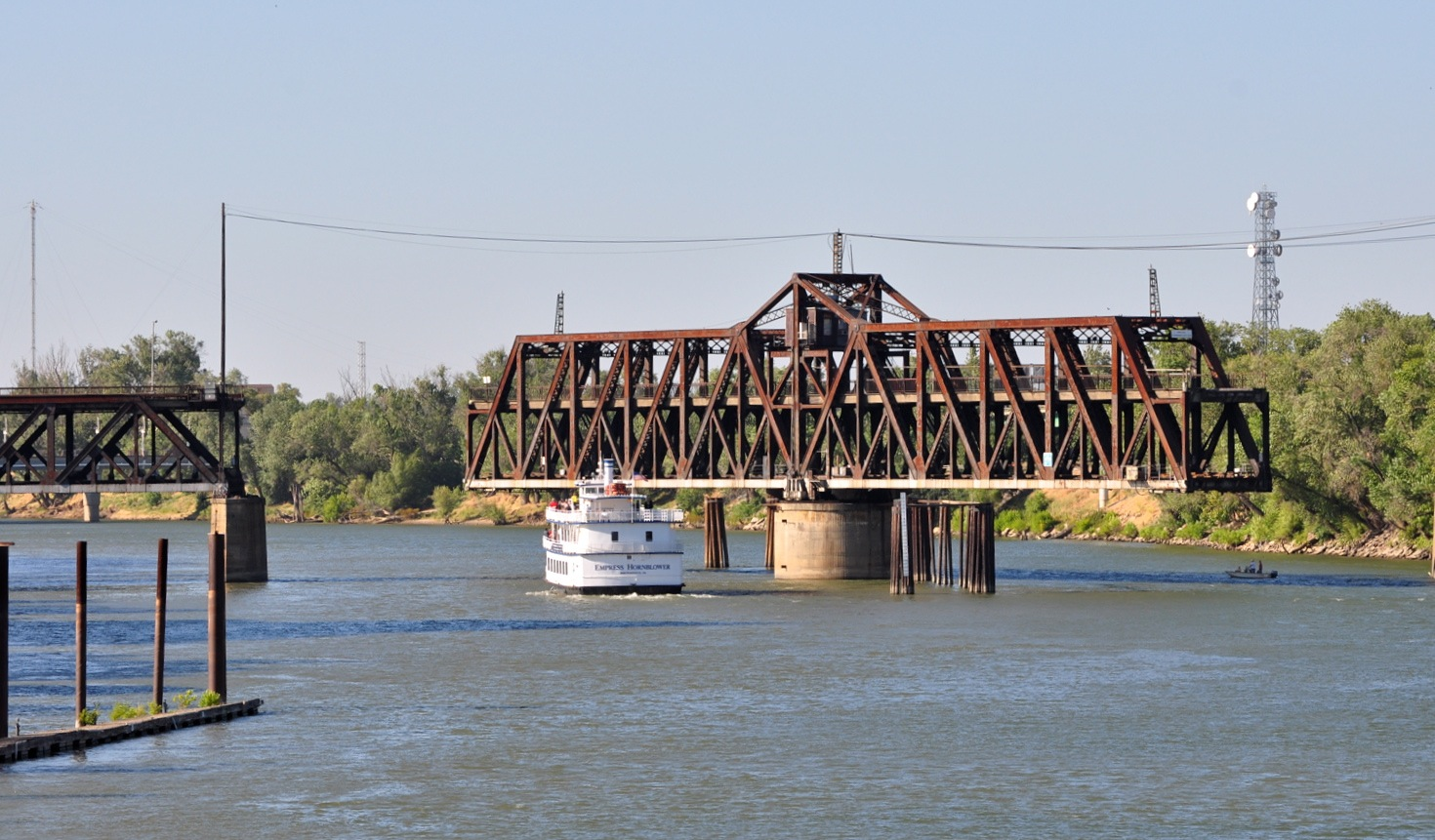
The swing span of the double-deck I Street Bridge, in Sacramento, open for a ship

- I Street Bridge, Sacramento, California
- India Point Railroad Bridge, Providence, Rhode Island crossing the Seekonk River
- International Railway Bridge connecting Buffalo, New York and Fort Erie, Ontario, Canada
- La Crosse Rail Bridge, crossing the Mississippi River between La Crescent, Minnesota, and La Crosse, Wisconsin
- Livingston Avenue Bridge, Albany, New York
- Mathers Bridge, connecting Merritt Island to Indian Harbour Beach, Florida across the Banana River
- Middle Branch of Patapsco River Rail Bridge, near Camden Yards, Baltimore, Maryland
- Mystic River Railroad Bridge, Mystic, Connecticut, carries Amtrak's Northeast Corridor tracks over the Mystic River.
- Nature Coast State Trail, over the Suwannee River between Wilcox, Florida and Old Town, Florida
- New Bedford-Fairhaven Bridge, connecting New Bedford and Fairhaven, Massachusetts
- New Richmond Swing Bridge, near Fennville, Michigan
- Norfolk Southern Railway Bridge crossing the Maumee River, Toledo, Ohio
- Norfolk Southern Railway Bridge crossing the Ocmulgee River in Lumber City, Georgia (2,800 feet (850 m) long; built 1916) (electrical swing components removed)
- Northern Avenue Bridge over Fort Point Channel in Boston, Massachusetts (1908 steel truss)
- North Landing Bridge, built in the 1950s, on the Atlantic Intracoastal Waterway where it forms part of the border between Chesapeake and Virginia Beach, Virginia,
- Omaha Road Bridge Number 15, an asymmetrical single-track railroad bridge over the Mississippi River between Saint Paul and Lilydale, Minnesota (1916)
- Oregon Slough Railroad Bridge (1908), Portland, Oregon
- Padanaram Bridge on the causeway protecting Apponagansett Bay in Dartmouth, Massachusetts
- Passaic River in Newark, New Jersey
  - Jackson Street Bridge
  - Bridge Street Bridge
  - Clay Street Bridge
- Pennsylvania Railroad's Shellpot Branch over the Christina River in Wilmington, Delaware (original two-track bridge replaced with a single-track bridge in 2003)
- Pennsylvania Railroad's South Philadelphia Branch Bridge over the Schuylkill River, Philadelphia, Pennsylvania
- Point Street Bridge, Providence, Rhode Island crossing the Providence River
- Portal Bridge, carrying the Northeast Corridor over the Hackensack River between Kearny and Secaucus, New Jersey
- Providence & Worcester railroad bridge, Middletown, Connecticut
- Richard V. Woods Memorial Bridge over the Beaufort River/Intracoastal Waterway in Beaufort, South Carolina
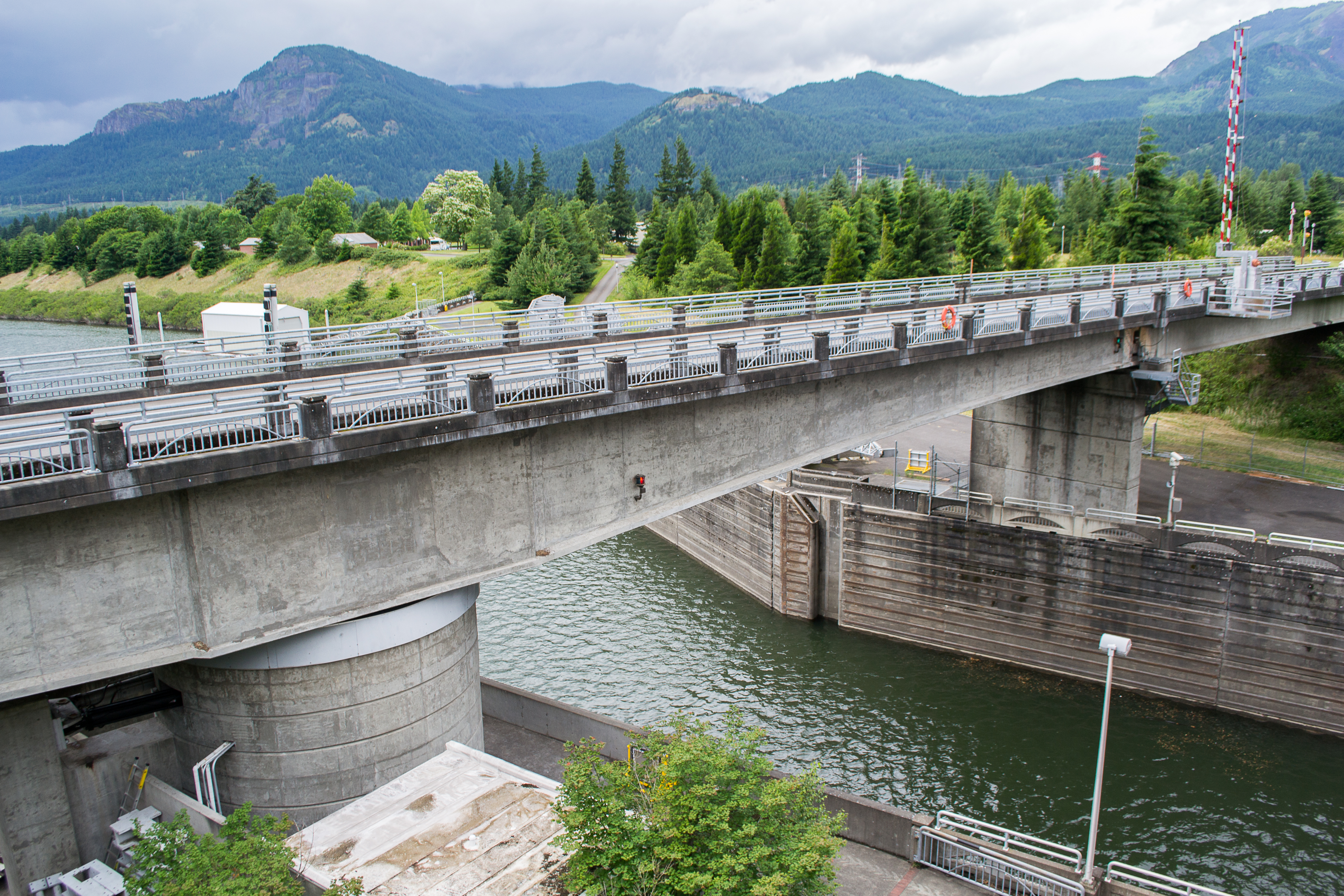
  Navigation Locks Bridge, Bonneville Dam
- Riverside-Delanco Bridge over Rancocas Creek in New Jersey
- Rock Island Swing Bridge over the Mississippi River between Inver Grove Heights and St. Paul Park, Minnesota
- "S" Swing Bridge over the Perquimans River, Hertford, North Carolina.
- Sakonnet River rail bridge, crossing the Sakonnet River between Tiverton and Portsmouth, Rhode Island
- Saugatuck River Bridge (Bridge No. 1349), Route 136 over the Saugatuck River, Westport, Connecticut (1884 iron-truss swing bridge)
- Shaw Cove Railroad Bridge, New London, Connecticut, carrying Amtrak's Northeast Corridor tracks over the entrance to Shaw Cove in New London
- Snohomish River Swing Bridge, Everett, Washington, carrying Amtrak and Burlington Northern
- Snow-Reed Swing Bridge, Fort Lauderdale, Florida, crossing the New River and connecting the Sailboat Bend neighborhood with the Riverside Park neighborhood
- Songo Lock Bridge, Naples, Maine; carries Songo Lock Road over the Songo River just upstream of the lock. Powered by human operator turning gears using a removable crank. Not to be confused with a former swing bridge about two miles upstream which carried US 302 until replaced with a fixed span in May 2012.
- South Bristol, Maine Asymmetric swing bridge connecting Rutherford Island to the mainland.
- Southport, ME connects Southport Island to Boothbay Harbor on Route 27.
- Spokane Street Bridge over the Duwamish Waterway in Seattle, Washington, built 1991. Features two reinforced concrete, serial swing spans, each rotating 45 degrees
- St. Joseph Swing Bridge over the Missouri River, St. Joseph, Missouri (1904)
- Topsail Island Swing Bridge, Surf City, North Carolina (Constructed in the 1950s, the swing bridge was demolished after being replaced by a fixed-span high rise bridge in 2018).
- Trail Creek Swing Bridge in Michigan City, Indiana, carrying the Michigan Central Railroad (now operated by Amtrak)
- Torry Island Swing Bridge, Torry Island, Florida
- Umpqua River Bridge near Reedsport, Oregon on US-101
- Victory Bridge, crossing the Raritan River in Perth Amboy, New Jersey (taken down in 2003)
- Walt Disney World Railroad (former Florida East Coast Railway) swing bridge, Bay Lake, Florida
- Woods Memorial Bridge over the Beaufort River in Beaufort, South Carolina
- Yancopin Bridge, Arkansas River, southeastern Arkansas. Former Missouri Pacific railroad bridge with separate vertical-lift and swing trusses now part of rail-trail; swing span now manually operated
- State Hwy 87 northbound bridge the eastern boundary of Bridge City, Texas
- Illinois Central Missouri River Bridge, formerly used for rail transport connecting Council Bluffs, Iowa to downtown Omaha, Nebraska is now a historical landmark.

=== Uruguay ===
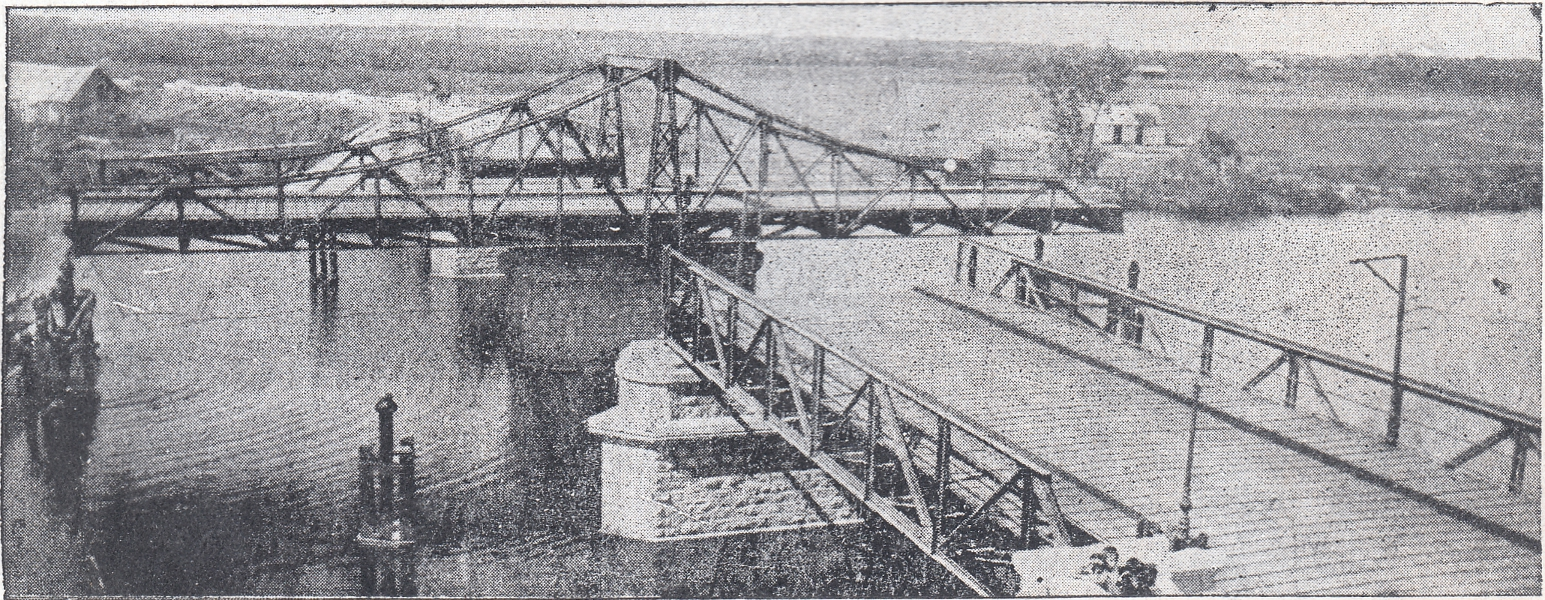
Carmelo Bridge, Uruguay, during its inauguration in 1912

- Carmelo Bridge, built in 1912 in Carmelo, is the oldest swing bridge in all of Latin America.
- Barra del Santa Lucia Bridge, built in 1925 as a railway bridge, is used only by pedestrians now.

=== Vietnam ===
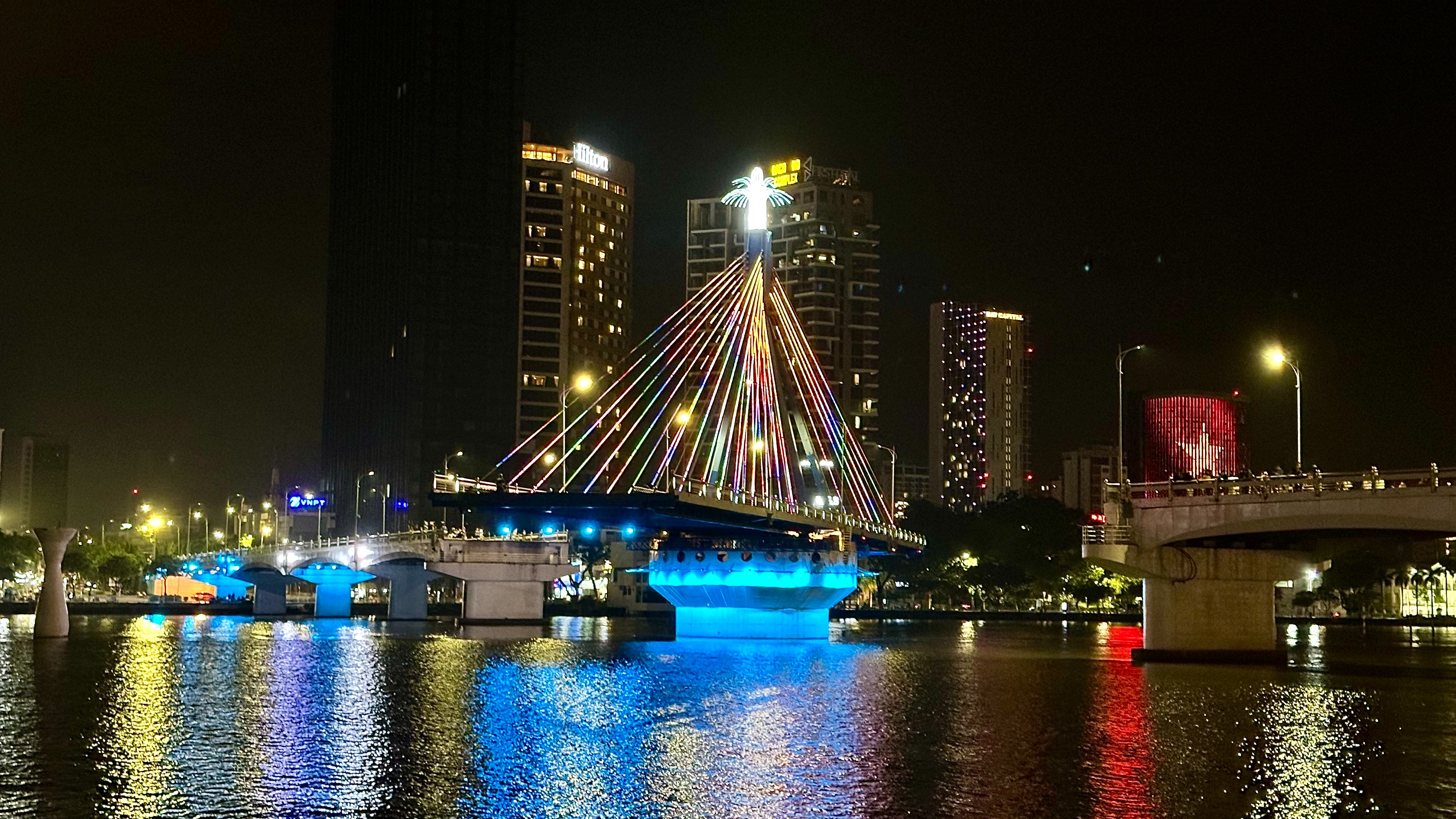
Han River Bridge in the open position

- Han River Bridge in downtown Da Nang was designed and built by Vietnamese engineers and workers, and opened on 29 March 2000. Featuring a symmetrical cable-stayed steel swing span with a total length of 122.7m rotating on a rim-bearing circular central pier, it is the only swing bridge operating in Vietnam as of 2025.

== See also ==
- Movable bridges for a list of other movable bridge types
