= Eastern Shore Public Library =

The Eastern Shore Public Library is a library system that serves counties of Accomack and Northampton counties in Virginia. The library system is within Region 3 of the Virginia Library Association (VLA).

== Service area ==
According to the FY 2014 Institute of Museum and Library Services Data Catalog, the Library System has a service area population of 45,768 with 1 central library and 3 branch libraries.

== History ==
The Eastern Shore Public Library was started on January 16, 1957 in Accomac's Community Hall. The library used a bookmobile with stops in 50 locations. The library became a regional library system on July 1, 1958. The Main Library, the primary library, located in Accomac. The Northampton Free Library is a branch library. Cape Charles Memorial Library and Chincoteague Island Library are affiliated locations.

== Branches ==
- Cape Charles Memorial Library (Cape Charles)
- Chincoteague Island Library (Chincoteague)
- Main Library (Accomac)
- Northampton Free Library (Nassawadox)
