= Grand Rapids Swing Bridge =

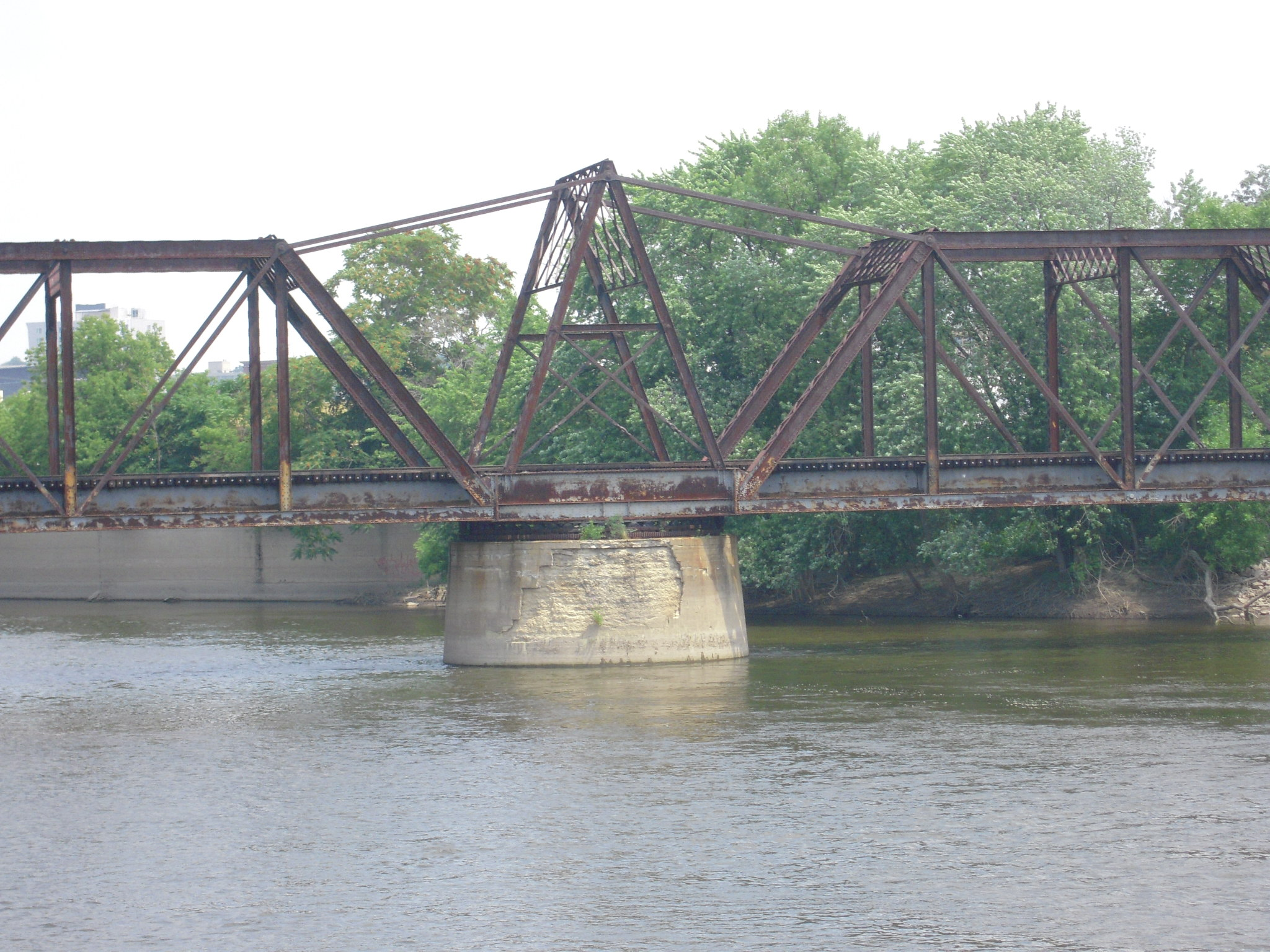
- turntable of the bridge
- Coordinates: 42°57′29″N 85°40′50″W
- Carries: Amtrak, CSX
- Crosses: Grand River
- Locale: Grand Rapids, Michigan
- Other name(s): Pere Marquette/C&O/CSX Railroad Bridge
- Preceded by: Chicago and West Michigan Railroad Bridge 1882

Characteristics
- Design: swing Pratt truss
- Material: Steel
- Width: 30 feet
- No. of spans: 4
- Clearance above: 19.2 feet at low water, closed

History
- Constructed by: American Bridge Company
- Construction start: 1901/1902/1908/1922
- Construction end: 1901/1903/1908/1922

The Grand Rapids Swing Bridge is a four span Pratt truss railroad swing bridge in Grand Rapids, Michigan. It was built in 1902 for the Pere Marquette Railroad as a swing bridge to allow steamboats to pass up the Grand River, but this river traffic was discontinued in 1907. The turntable is rusted shut and currently inoperable. Originally it was built as a double track bridge, but one set of tracks has been removed. The bridge itself is still in use, and carries an Amtrak train which runs from the Amtrak station just east of the bridge, as well as CSX freight trains. In crossing the Grand River, it touches the south end of a small island.
