= Chincoteague (crater) =

Crater on Mars

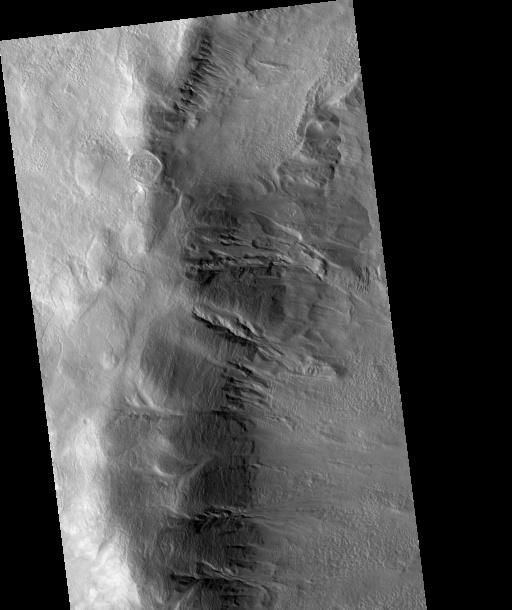
- Chincoteague crater, as seen by HiRISE.
- Planet: Mars
- Coordinates: 41.5°N 236.0°W
- Quadrangle: Cebrenia
- Diameter: 37.0 km (23.0 mi)
- Eponym: Chincoteague, Virginia, USA

Chincoteague is an impact crater in the Cebrenia quadrangle of Mars, located at 41.5° N and 236.0° W. It was named after Chincoteague, a town in Virginia, US. Chincoteague crater has a small central mound. Along the wall, a number of gullies are visible.

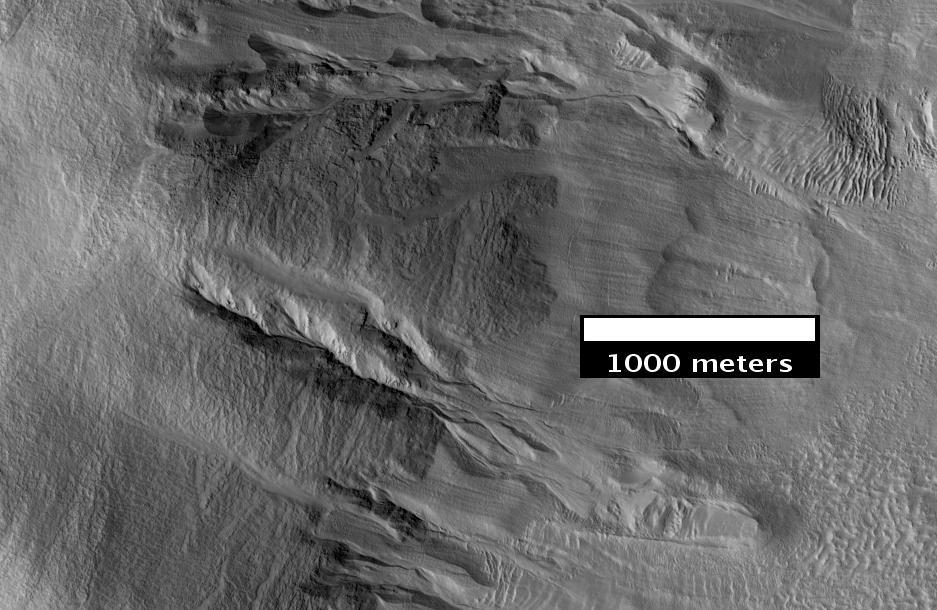
Close-up of Chincoteague crater, as seen by HiRISE. Image close-up view of previous image. Note the gullies and associated landforms.

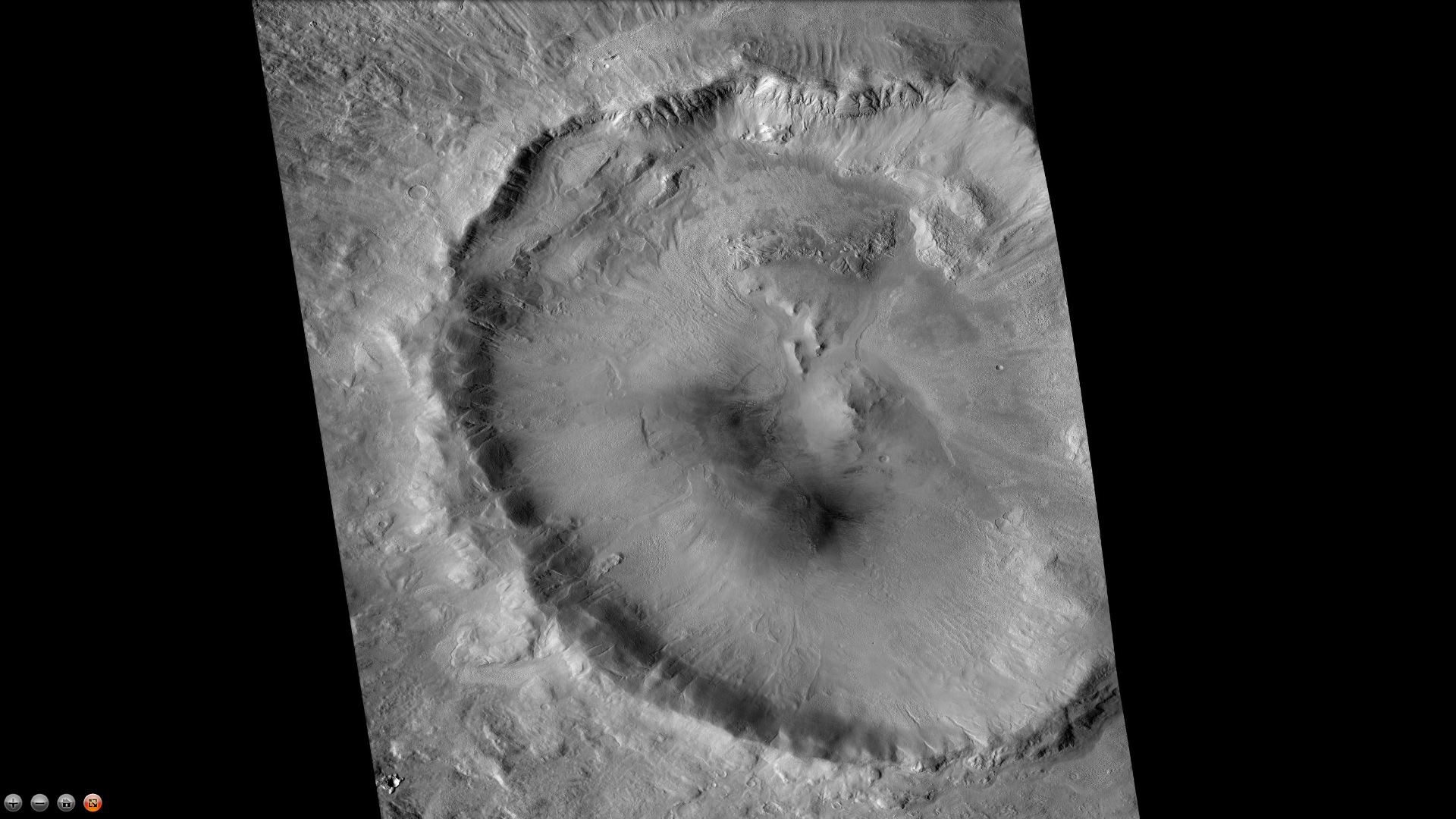
Chincoteague crater, as seen by CTX camera (on MRO).

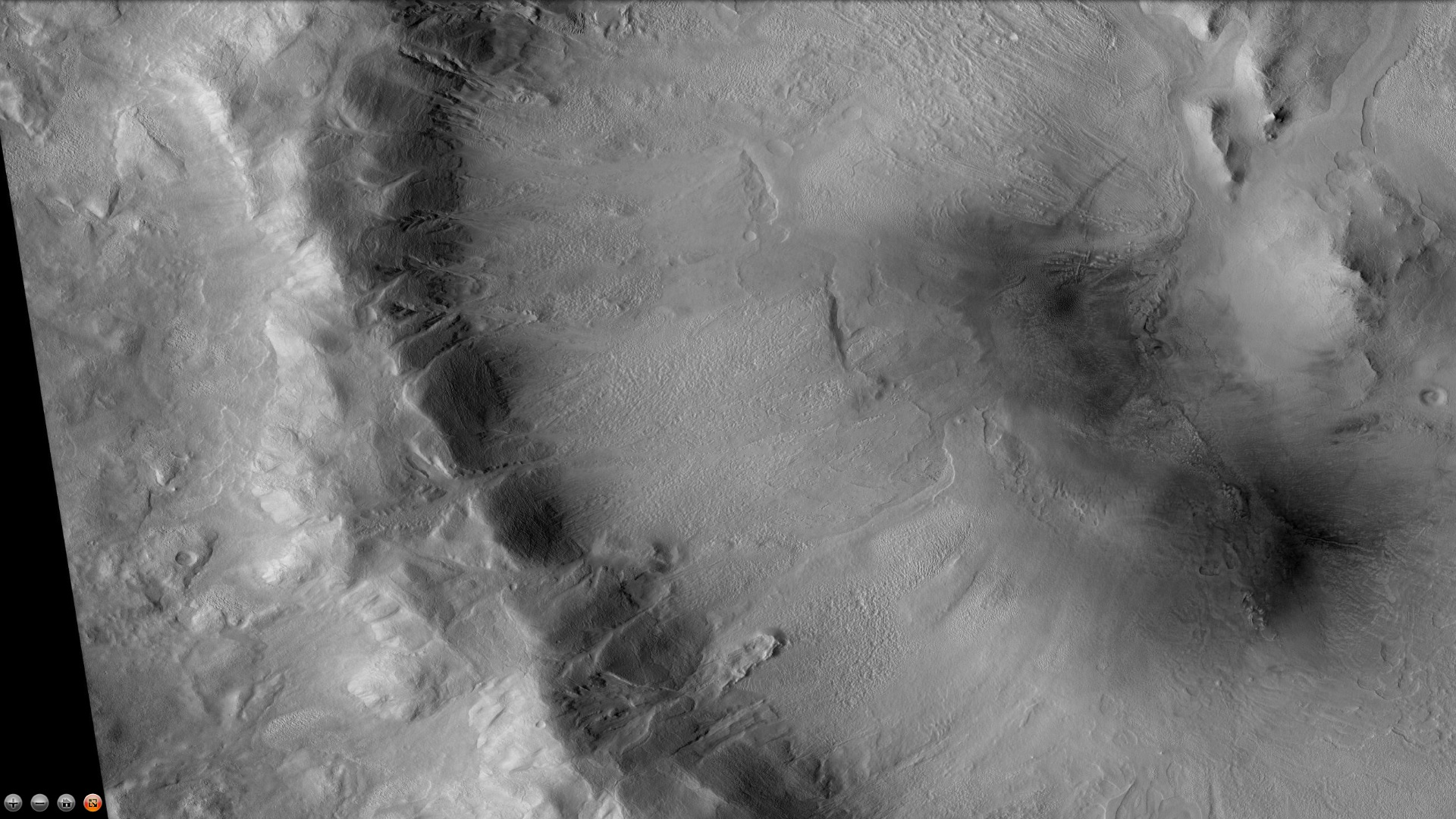
Gullies on western wall of Chincoteague crater, as seen by CTX camera. Note: this is an enlargement of the previous image.

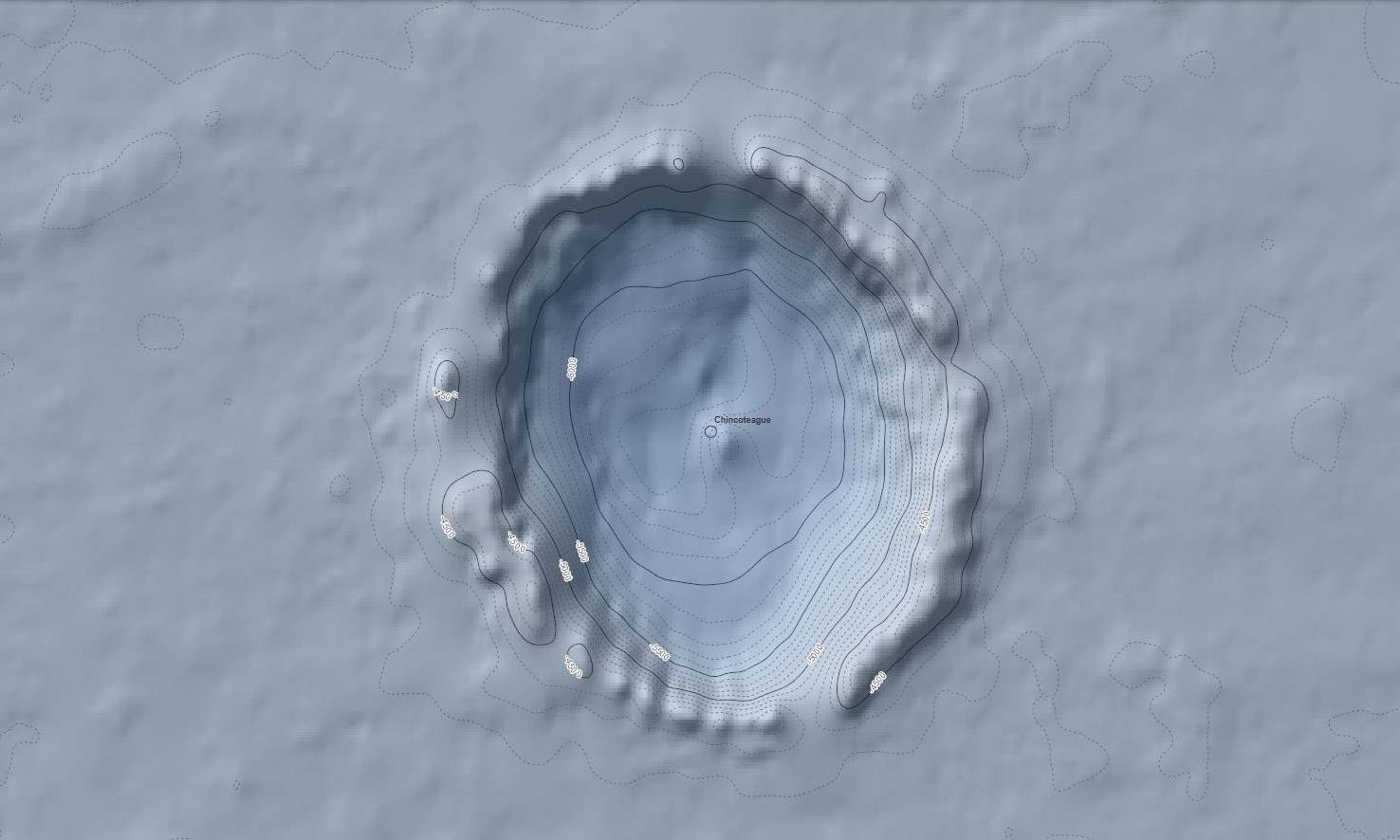
A topographic map created using Mars Orbiter Laser Altimeter (MOLA) data. This map shows the relative elevation in 100 m (330 ft) elevation contour lines (dashed) and 500 m (1,600 ft) elevation contour lines (bold) with an average accuracy of each point is originally ~100 m (330 ft) in horizontal position and ~1 m (3 ft 3 in) in radius (Neumann and others, 2001). However, the total elevation uncertainty is at least ±3 m (9.8 ft) due to the global error in the areoid.

== Gullies ==
Chincoteague crater displays gullies on its wall. Many ideas have been put forth to explain them. For many years, many researchers thought they were made by recent liquid water. However, with more observations, other mechanisms became possible. It was observed that new gullies were forming today during the Martian spring when dry ice was able to sublimate (turn from a solid to a gas). Chunks of dry ice could accumulate in the cold winter months and then slide down when warmed. In the thin atmosphere of the planet they would ride on a cushion of gas that was coming off the pieces of dry ice.

== See also ==
- List of craters on Mars
