= USCGC Chincoteague =

USCGC Chincoteague has been the name of more than one United States Coast Guard ship, and may refer to:

- USCGC Chincoteague (1919), a tug in commission from 1919 to 1923
- USCGC Chincoteague (WAVP-375), a cutter in commission from 1949 to 1972
- USCGC Chincoteague (WPB-1320), a patrol boat in commission since 1988
