= Chincoteague Island Library =

Library in Virginia, United States

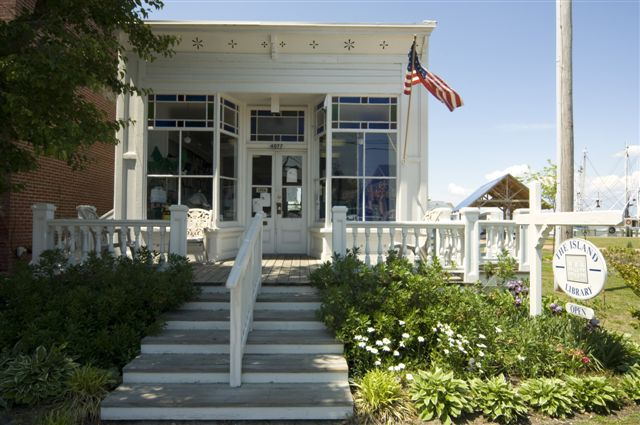
- Chincoteague Island Library in 2008
- Interactive map of the Chincoteague Island Library area

General information
- Architectural style: Queen Anne
- Location: 4077 Main Street; Chincoteague, Virginia, United States
- Coordinates: 37°56′3″N 75°22′37.5″W
- Completed: 1890s

Technical details
- Structural system: wood frame
- Size: 750 square feet (70 m^{2}); 1 story

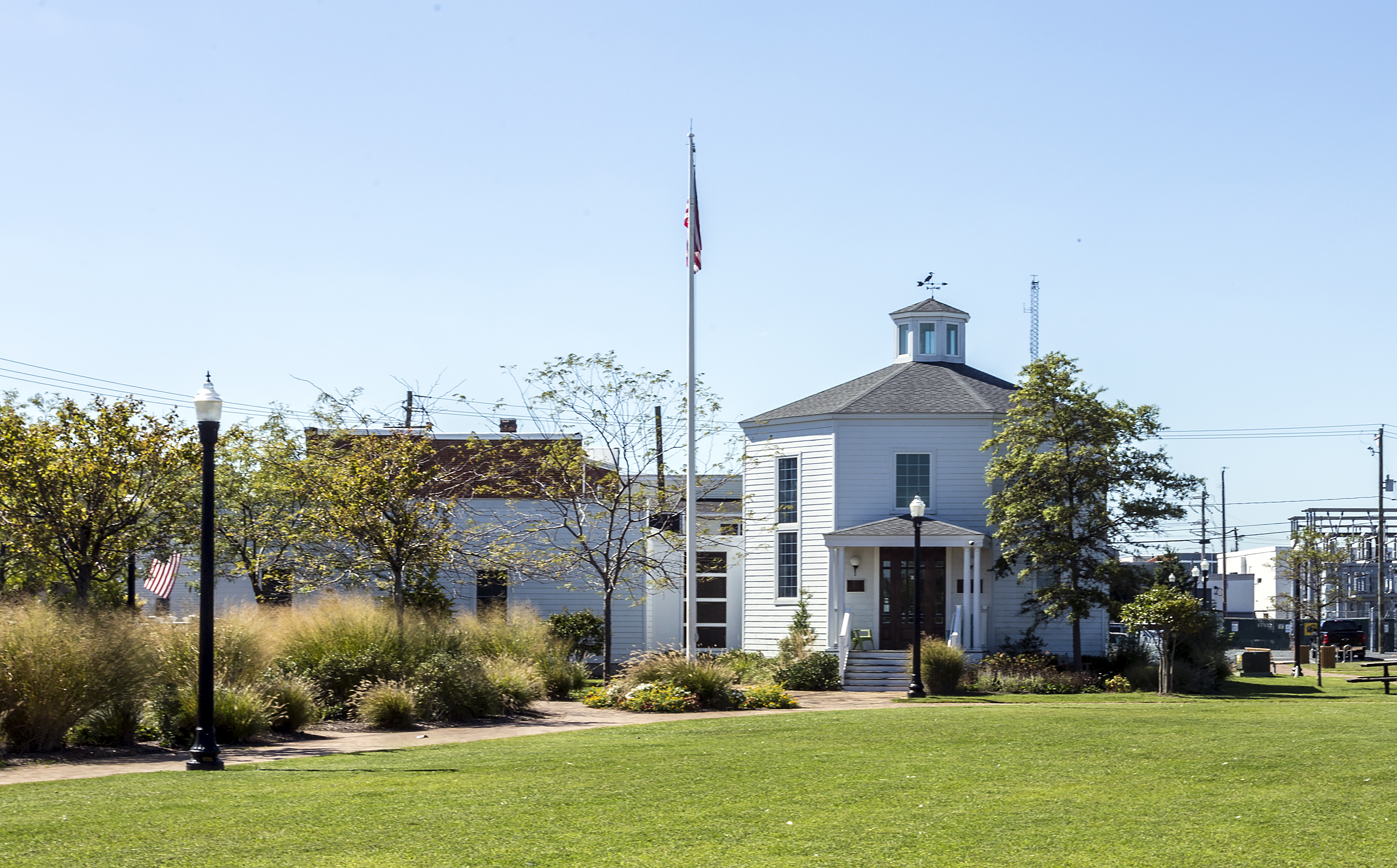
The 2010 addition from Waterfront Park in 2017

The Chincoteague Island Library is a historic U.S. building located at 4077 Main Street, Chincoteague, Virginia. Built in the 1890s, this one-story building is the oldest commercial wood frame structure in Chincoteague. It was initially a drug store, but was later used as a barber shop beginning in 1908. On July 4, 1995, the building opened as a public library. In 2010, a new wing was added to the library to accommodate its collection and offer more space for patrons to use. Originally 600 square feet, the library has tripled in size with the addition of the new wing.

The library is part of the Eastern Shore Public Library system. It is primarily supported by private donations and grants from the communities of Accomack County, Virginia. The library offers various programs for children and adults throughout the year, including book clubs, children's reading programs, and computer classes.

The library's collection contains current and popular books, magazines, newspapers, and audio-visual materials, including DVDs, audiobooks and CDs. The library offers a 24-hour wireless internet connection, with computers for patrons to use for email, word processing, and use of the web.

The Chincoteague Island Library also collaborates with the Museum of Chincoteague Island on the Chincoteague Island Life History Project. This project began in 2004 as an oral history initiative, where residents of Chincoteague Island and neighboring communities were interviewed on the local culture and history.
