= Chincoteague Channel =

Channel on the Eastern Shore of Virginia, US

Coordinates: 37°54′58″N 75°23′57″W

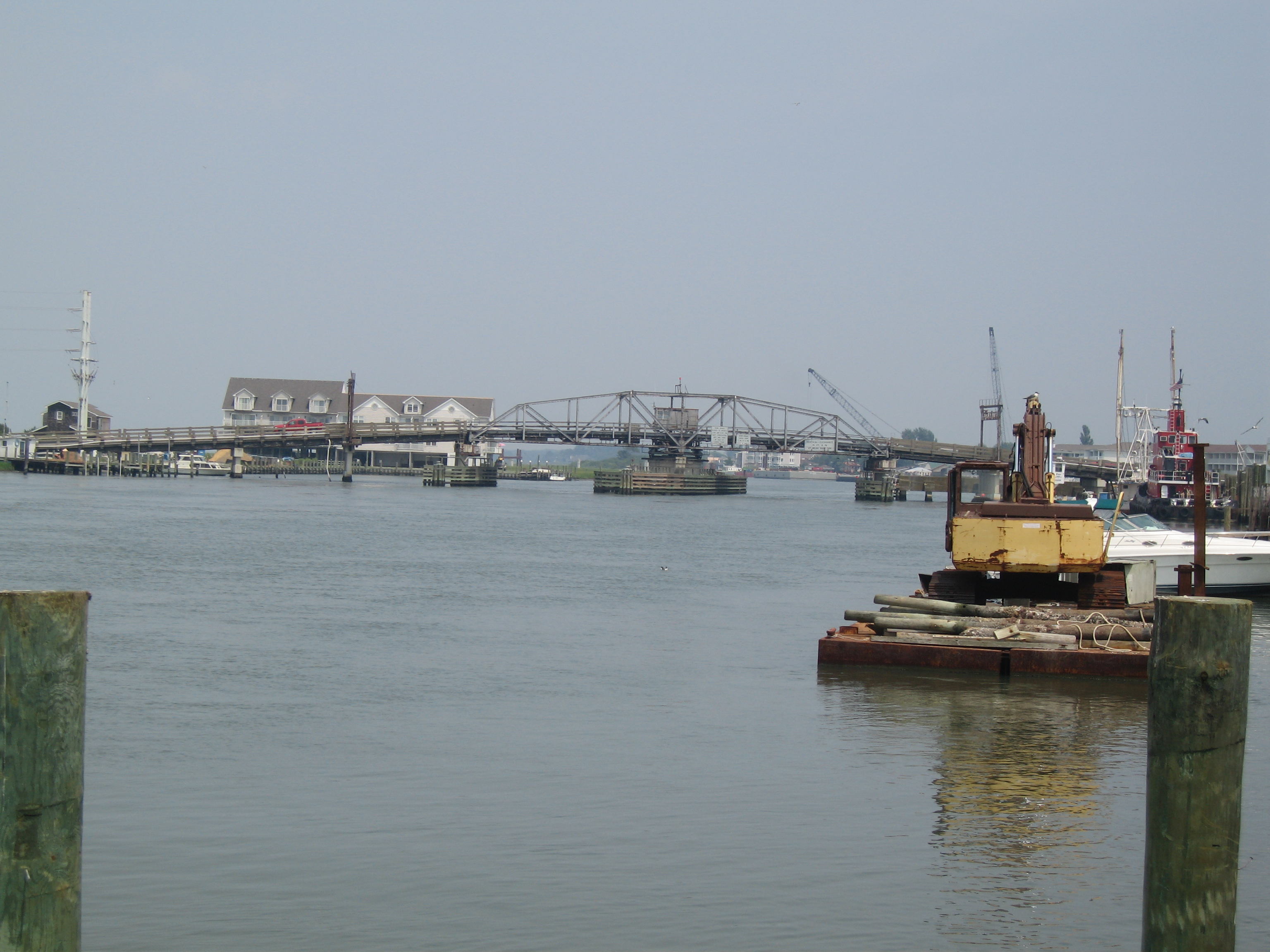
Chincoteague Channel with the swing bridge in the distance

Chincoteague Channel is a channel on the Eastern Shore of Virginia between marshlands to the northwest and Chincoteague Island to the southeast. The Chincoteague Channel connects to Chincoteague Bay to the northeast and Chincoteague Inlet to the southwest.
