= Rotaries in Massachusetts =

This is a list of roundabouts in the Commonwealth of Massachusetts in the United States. Intersections that are called traffic circles or roundabouts in the rest of the US are referred to as "rotaries" in Massachusetts, as well as other parts of New England including parts of Connecticut, New Hampshire, Maine, Rhode Island, and Vermont.

In 2017, MassDOT announced that it was eliminating rotaries in favor of roundabouts. In 2020 it issued guidance on the design and planning for roundabouts.

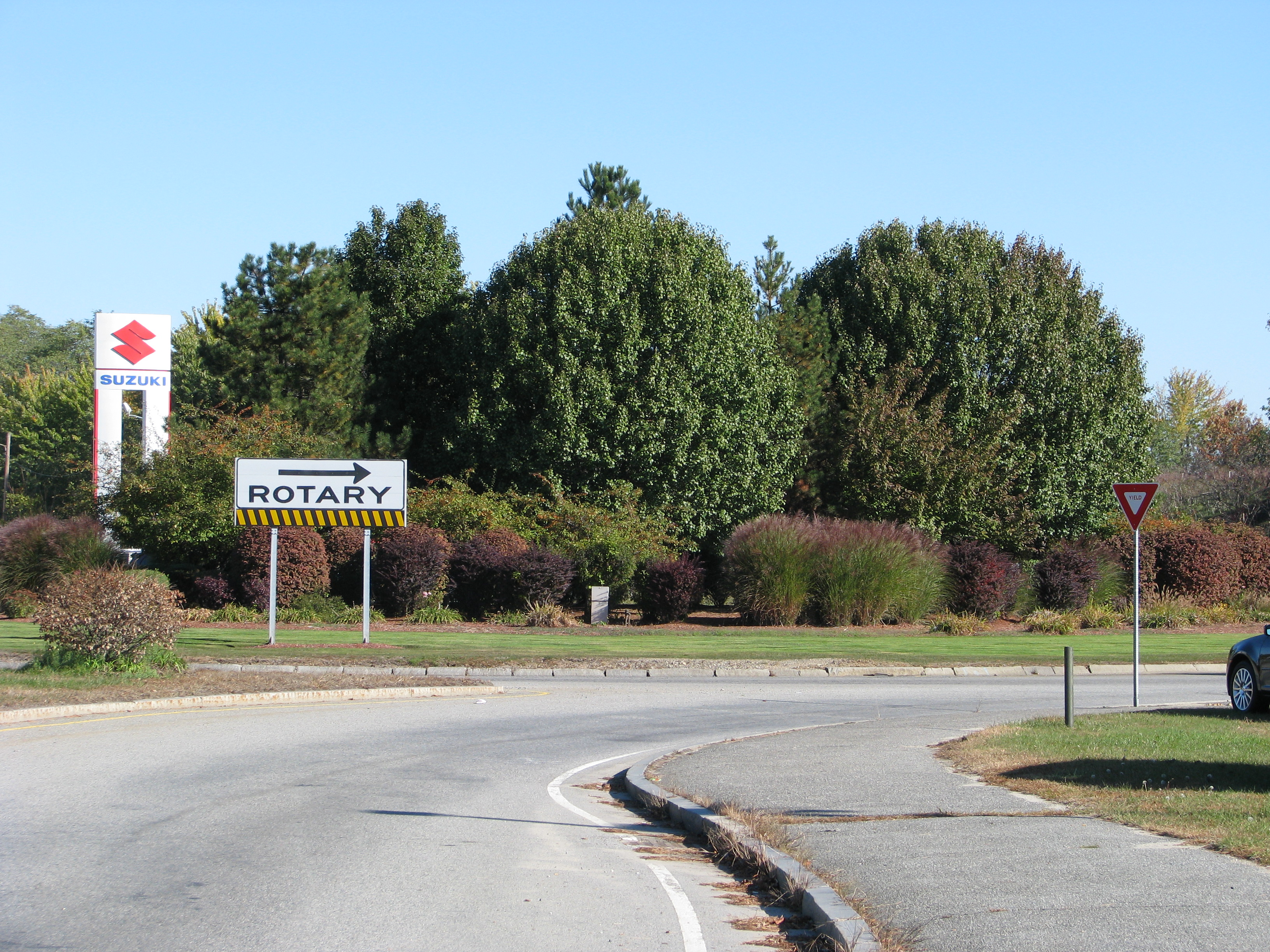
Rotary sign in Lowell, Massachusetts. Note the Yield sign

== Suffolk County ==
- Charlestown, Boston – Sullivan Square (Interstate 93/U.S. Route 1, Massachusetts Route 99, Massachusetts Route 38 Alford St., and Main St.)
- East Boston – Orient Heights (Saratoga St., Boardman St., and Ford St)
- South Boston – Boston Old Colony Rotary
- Dorchester, Boston – Columbia Point Rotary (Southeast Expressway:Interstate 93/U.S. Route 1/Massachusetts Route 3)
- Dorchester, Boston – Neponset Circle (Southeast Expressway:Interstate 93/U.S. Route 1/Massachusetts Route 3, Morrissey Boulevard and Massachusetts Route 203)
- Dorchester, Boston – Morrissey Boulevard near Popes Hill Street has two U-turns making it rotary like
- Jamaica Plain, Boston – Hyde Square (Centre Street, Day Street, Perkins Street)
- Jamaica Plain, Boston – General Heath Square (Heath Street, Parker Street, Wensley Street, New Heath Street)
- Revere, Massachusetts – Bell Circle (Massachusetts Route 16, Massachusetts Route 60, Massachusetts Route 1A, and Beach Street) is a highly congested complex rotary like traffic intersection. There are stoplights in the rotary which is unusual in Massachusetts.
- Revere, Massachusetts – Brown Circle (Massachusetts Route 60, and Massachusetts Route 107)
- Revere, Massachusetts – Copeland Circle (U.S. Route 1, Massachusetts Route 60, is an existing interchange between Route 1 and Route 60. In addition there is an abandoned partially built interchange to Interstate 95 Interstate 695 (Massachusetts)) above the rotary.
- Revere, Massachusetts - Eliot Circle is at the southern end of Revere Beach. The rotary connects Ocean Avenue, Revere Beach Boulevard, and Winthrop Parkway / Massachusetts Route 145. The northern end of Revere Beach has Cary Circle but the circle is used for parking instead of traffic flow.
- Chelsea, Massachusetts – The top of Mount Bellingham, Highland street at Bellingham Street, is functionally a rotary with parking on both sides of a common.

== Middlesex County ==
- Arlington, Massachusetts – Immediately west of the Mystic River at the intersection of Mystic Valley Parkway and Medford Street / Route 60. Marked by state "rotary" signs. The pair of rotaries connects Mystic Valley Parkway roads adjacent to Mystic Lake in each city.
- Ashland, Massachusetts – Route 126 at Shaws Shopping Plaza
- Ayer, Massachusetts – Route 111 and Route 2A
- Cambridge, Massachusetts – Alewife Brook Parkway (Massachusetts Route 2, Massachusetts Route 16, and US Route 3) with Concord Ave, in West Cambridge, in a rotary interchange built in a small space.
- Cambridge, Massachusetts – Fresh Pond Parkway (Massachusetts Route 2, Massachusetts Route 16, and US Route 3) with Concord Ave, in West Cambridge, in a rotary interchange built in a small space.
- Cambridge, Massachusetts – Memorial Drive (U.S. Route 3) & Boston University Bridge (Massachusetts Route 2), in a rotary interchange built in a small space.
- Cambridge, Massachusetts – Harvard Square, Dawes Island Park Massachusetts Avenue (Massachusetts Route 2A) Peabody, and Garden Streets in an elongated configuration due to portal into Harvard Square Bus Tunnel
- Carlisle, Massachusetts - In the town center, Lowell Road, Concord Road, and Massachusetts Route 225.
- Concord, Massachusetts – In the historic town center Monument Square, Massachusetts Route 62 is an elongated rotary.
- Concord, Massachusetts – Mass. Route 2 in West Concord, next to MCI-Concord ("The Reformatory").
- Everett, Massachusetts – Santili Circle Massachusetts Route 16 (Revere Beach Parkway) at Gateway Center shopping plaza
- Everett, Massachusetts Sweetser Circle Massachusetts Route 16, Massachusetts Route 99 Site of the Abenaqui Tanker explosion.
- Hudson, Massachusetts – Massachusetts Route 85 and Broad St.
- Lexington, Massachusetts - Rotary installed in 2024 replacing a previous triangle configuration at the intersection of Bedford Street, Hancock Street, and Harrington Rd. Just outside the town center directly adjacent to the famous Lexington Battle Green
- Lowell, Massachusetts – Intersection of Industrial Ave, Reiss Ave, and the Lowell Connector. Near Cross Point (Lowell, Massachusetts)
- Lowell, Massachusetts – The Hunts Falls Bridge at VFW Highway is a multilevel rotary interchange.
- Medford, Massachusetts – Immediately east of the Mystic River at the Intersection of State Route 60 / High St. and Mystic Valley Parkway, and Arlington Street. No state "rotary" sign marks this rotary
- Medford, Massachusetts – Medford Square Rotary (Interstate 93, Massachusetts Route 60, and Ring Road)
- Medford, Massachusetts – Roosevelt Circle is an oval shaped rotary interchange at the intersection of Interstate 93, Route 28 & S Border Road. 42.42917°N 71.10333°W
- Melrose, Massachusetts – Green street at Howard street
- Natick, Massachusetts – In the Natick Mall area has 3 Rotaries: One at Flutie Pass and Natick Mall Road over by Macy's. Another at the intersection of Flutie Pass, Nouvelle Way, and Natick Mall Road over by Wegmans. And another Rotary on Natick Mall Road in between former Sears Entrance and Nordstrom Entrance (completed in 2018).
- Pepperell, Massachusetts – Route 111 and Route 113 in
- Somerville, Massachusetts – in the Assembly Square neighborhood at Grand Union Blvd at Great River Rd
- Wakefield, Massachusetts, and Reading, Massachusetts – MA Route 129 Rotary at MA Route 128 exit 40 (Interstate 95/Massachusetts Route 128, and Massachusetts Route 129)
- Waltham, Massachusetts – Interstate 95 & U.S. Route 20, is a large rotary interchange with the on ramps inside the rotary. 42.37111°N 71.26944°W
- Winchester, Massachusetts – Town Center (Mt Vernon Street, Shore Road, Park Street, and Main Street and the Boston to Lowell Line of the MBTA Commuter Rail)
- Woburn, Massachusetts – (Interstate 95 (Massachusetts Route 128), and Massachusetts Route 38
- Woburn, Massachusetts – The town Center at (Massachusetts Route 38, Winn Street, Pleasant Street, and Montvale Avenue) somewhat triangular shaped rotary with traffic lights

== Essex County ==
- Amesbury, Massachusetts - Massachusetts Route 150 / Friend street at School street on the edge of the town center forms another rotary
- Amesbury, Massachusetts - The town center has a small rotary at the intersection of High Street, Market Street, Elm Street, and Main Street / Massachusetts Route 150
- Gloucester, Massachusetts – Blackburn Circle (Massachusetts Route 128, School House Rd. and Dory Rd.) This large rotary connects an office park, a shopping center, and the continuation of Route 128 to its terminus a few thousand feet away.
- Gloucester, Massachusetts – Grant Circle is a large rotary at the intersection of (Route 128, Route 127), and Washington street to downtown Gloucester. Follows immediately A. Piatt Andrew Bridge
- Lynn, Massachusetts – Intersection of Federal Street, Marion Street, and Waterhill Street converted to a rotary between 2019 and 2020.
- Lynn, Massachusetts – Intersection of Western Ave, Federal Street, South Street, and Market Square. A new rotary built between 2012 and 2017 replacing a former series of lights.
- Lynn, Massachusetts & Nahant, Massachusetts - Nahant Circle is a large, three lane rotary formed by the intersection of the terminus of the Lynnway, Nahant Road, and Lynn Shore Drive. The rotary is directly adjacent to Nahant Beach Reservation
- Lynnfield, Massachusetts – Condon Circle also known as Goodwin Circle is a large rotary on the border of Lynnfield, Lynn, Massachusetts and Peabody, Massachusetts. It is the intersection of Lynnfield Street, Salem Street, and a connector to (Interstate 95/Massachusetts Route 128, U.S. Route 1, Massachusetts Route 129
- Methuen, Massachusetts – Interstate 93, Massachusetts Route 110 and Massachusetts Route 113. Former rotary that was replaced with a partial cloverleaf starting in mid-2013, with completion of new interchange and demolition of rotary in early 2017.
- Newburyport, Massachusetts – U.S. Route 1 and State Street
- Salem, Massachusetts - Summer Street at Chestnut / Norman streets forms a rotary installed between 2018 and 2020
- Salem, Massachusetts - Swampscott Road and First street was converted to a rotary in 2019
- Saugus – Cliftondale Center a small rotary located in the largest business district in the town outside Route 1
- Saugus – Town Center around a large Civil War Memorial

== Norfolk County ==
- Braintree, Massachusetts – Massachusetts Route 3 & Union Street is an oval shaped rotary interchange. 42.21028°N 70.99667°W
- Foxborough, Massachusetts – The town center at Massachusetts Route 140 has a large rotary around the town common intersecting with Cocasset Street, Mechanic Street, South Street, Bird Street, Rockhill Street and Central Street.
- Norfolk, Massachusetts - The town center along Union street has a pair of rotaries at Main street and at North street directly adjacent to the town library
- Norwood, Massachusetts – U.S. Route 1 & Nahatan Street and Neponset Street is a rotary of surface streets with ramps leading to and from the highway below.
- Quincy, Massachusetts – Massachusetts Route 3, Furnace Brook Parkway and Willard Street is a rotary interchange
- Quincy, Massachusetts – Massachusetts Route 3A, Wharf Street, Dee Road, and the access road to the Fore River Shipyard and the United States Naval Shipbuilding Museum, at the north (west) end of the Fore River Bridge
- Westwood, Massachusetts – Interstate 95 (wrong-way concurrency with US Route 1) & Canton Street, East Street and Allied Drive is a rotary of surface streets with ramps leading to and from the highway below.

== Plymouth County ==
- Hingham, Massachusetts – (Massachusetts Route 3A, Summer Street and Green Street) near the town center.
- Middleborough, Massachusetts – (U.S. Route 44, Massachusetts Route 18 and Massachusetts Route 28)
- Plymouth Center, Massachusetts – (Water Street, South Park Avenue and Town Wharf) 0.2 miles east of the junction of U.S. Route 44 and Massachusetts Route 3A
- Bridgewater, Massachusetts – Massachusetts Route 18, Massachusetts Route 28 and Massachusetts Route 104. The town center has signed rotary around the town common. It is two parallel streets carrying the three highways with two cross roads completing the rotary at the north and south ends
- Scituate, Massachusetts – Massachusetts Route 3A, Massachusetts Route 123, New Driftway, and Country Way. Near the terminus of the Greenbush MBTA Commuter rail
- Whitman, Massachusetts – Whitman Circle (Massachusetts Route 58, Essex Street and Raynor Avenue)

== Barnstable County ==
- Bourne, Massachusetts – Bourne Circle (Massachusetts Route 28 and Trowbridge Rd), at the south end of the Bourne Bridge
- Bourne in the village of Buzzards Bay, Massachusetts – Buzzards Bay Circle (U.S. Route 6, Massachusetts Route 28, Head of the Bay Road, and the ramp to Massachusetts Route 25 west and Massachusetts Route 28 south (the Bourne Bridge)) east of the village
- Bourne in the village of Buzzards Bay, Massachusetts – U.S. Route 6, Massachusetts Route 28 and access road leading to Lincoln Avenue west of the village
- Hyannis, Massachusetts – Airport Rotary, Massachusetts Route 28 and Massachusetts Route 132
- Hyannis, Massachusetts – West Main St. and North St.
- Orleans, Massachusetts – Orleans Circle U.S. Route 6 at Massachusetts Route 6A/Massachusetts Route 28
- Orleans, Massachusetts – Massachusetts Route 28, Massachusetts Route 39 and Quanset Road 41.751460°N 69.990950°W
- Mashpee, Massachusetts – (Massachusetts Route 28, Massachusetts Route 151 and Great Neck Road)
- Harwich, Massachusetts – Cape Cod Rail Trail rotary is the only non motor vehicle / pedestrian rotary in the state. 41.688889°N 70.089000°W
- Chatham, Massachusetts - Massachusetts Route 28 and George Ryder Road 41.683011°N 69.995509°W
- Chatham, Massachusetts - Massachusetts Route 28 and Barn Hill Road 41.682455°N 69.991753°W

== Dukes County ==
- Oak Bluffs, Massachusetts – Edgartown Vineyard Haven Rd at Barnes Road

== Nantucket County ==
- Nantucket, Massachusetts – Hooper Farm Road at Sparks Avenue and Lower Pleasant Street
- Nantucket, Massachusetts – Intersection of Orange Street, Sparks Avenue, Old South Road, and Milestone Road
- Siasconset, Massachusetts (Neighborhood of Nantucket Town) - In Siasconset center at the intersection of Main Street, Elbow Lane, Ocean Ave, and Gully Road

== Bristol County ==
- Fall River, Massachusetts – U.S. Route 6 at Exit 5 of Massachusetts Route 24 meet in a rotary.
- Somerset, Massachusetts – Massachusetts Route 103 travels along Wilbur Avenue and meets with Riverside Avenue and Brayton Avenue in a rotary at the former location of the Slade's Ferry Bridge just 0.2 miles south of its terminus.

== Worcester County ==
- Worcester, Massachusetts – Kelley Square was converted from one of the most notoriously open "hope for the best" intersections in the state to a rotary between 2019 and 2021.
- Gardner, Massachusetts – Massachusetts Route 2 & Pearson Boulevard, is a rotary interchange. 42.56417°N 71.97917°W
- Gardner, Massachusetts – Massachusetts Route 2 & Massachusetts Route 68, is a rotary interchange.
- Sterling, Massachusetts – Route 12 and I-190
- Fitchburg, Massachusetts – Electric Avenue and the name change between Rollstone Street and Rollstone Road.
- Westborough, Massachusetts – Route 30 / East Main Street & West main street at Route 135 / Milk and South Streets.

== Franklin County ==
- Greenfield – Interstate 91, Massachusetts Route 2, and Massachusetts Route 2A all meet at a grade-separated rotary interchange in (Exit 43 of I-91)

== Hampshire County ==
- Northampton, Massachusetts – The intersection of Massachusetts Route 9 / Bridge Street, I-91 Exit 25, and Damon Road. Built between 2019 and 2022.
- Easthampton, Massachusetts – The town center at the intersection of Main Street, Northampton Street / Massachusetts Route 10, and Pleasant street has a rotary pattern around a triangular town common
- Easthampton, Massachusetts – Park Street at the intersection of the Mountain view school service road added in 2022
- South Hadley, Massachusetts – US Route 202 at North Main street just east of the Connecticut River crossing to Holyoke

== Hampden County ==
- Springfield, Massachusetts – In the Six Corners/Maple Heights, Springfield, Massachusetts section of the city at the intersection of Walnut Street, Alden Street, Ashley Street, and Hancock Street. Built around 2019.
- Agawam, Massachusetts – US Route 5, State Route 57 (Massachusetts), and River Road is a rotary of River Road and Route 57 with US Route 5 (as a highway) as an overpass with access ramps to and from Route 57. It is locally notorious for dangerous conditions and traffic. 42.081205°N 72.589485°W
- West Springfield, Massachusetts – Mass Route 147 and US Route 5 (as a highway) is an open circle rotary with access ramps leading to and from the highway below.
- West Springfield, Massachusetts – US Route 20 and US Route 5 (as a highway). Route 5 is a tunnel underneath this rotary with access ramps leading to the rotary. The rotary takes you to downtown West Springfield if traveling west or over the North End Bridge to Springfield if traveling east. 42.107511°N 72.616351°W
- East Longmeadow, Massachusetts – Shaker Road (Connecticut Route 220), Maple Street, North Main Street (Massachusetts Route 83), Elm Street, Pleasant Street, Somers Road (Connecticut Route 83), and Prospect Street

== Berkshire County ==
- Williamstown, Massachusetts – U.S. Route 7 and Massachusetts Route 2 in the town center.
- Adams, Massachusetts – Friend Street at Massachusetts Route 8 built between 2015 and 2016
- Pittsfield, Massachusetts – The town center at the intersection of North, South, East, and West streets is a town common set up as a rotary. East and South streets are concurrent with Route 9
- Great Barrington, Massachusetts – U.S. Route 7 and Massachusetts Route 23 / Maple Ave. Built in 2022 replacing a formal traffic signal intersection.
