= Massachusetts Route 137 =

State highway in Barnstable County, Massachusetts, US

Route 137
- Route 137 highlighted in red

Route information
- Maintained by MassDOT
- Length: 6.833 mi (10.997 km)

Major junctions
- South end: Route 28 in Chatham
- US 6 in Harwich
- North end: Route 6A in Brewster

Location
- Country: United States
- State: Massachusetts
- Counties: Barnstable

Highway system
- Massachusetts State Highway System; Interstate; US; State
| ← Route 136 | → Route 138 |

Massachusetts Route 137 is a 6.833-mile-long (10.997 km) north–south state route on Cape Cod in the U.S. state of Massachusetts. The route begins at an intersection with Route 28 in the town of Chatham. The route serves as a connector between Chatham, the town of Harwich (where it meets US 6) and Brewster. In Brewster, Route 137 ends at a junction with Route 6A, a short distance southwest of Route 124.

== Route description ==
Route 137 begins at an intersection with Route 28 (Main Street) just east of South Chatham, within the town of Chatham. Route 137 proceeds north along Meetinghouse Road, passing a residential strip before bending northeastward. The route soon enters the community of East Harwich, crossing through some woods at the southern end. At Old Queen Anne Road, Route 137 makes a sharp turn to the northwest and enters downtown East Harwich.

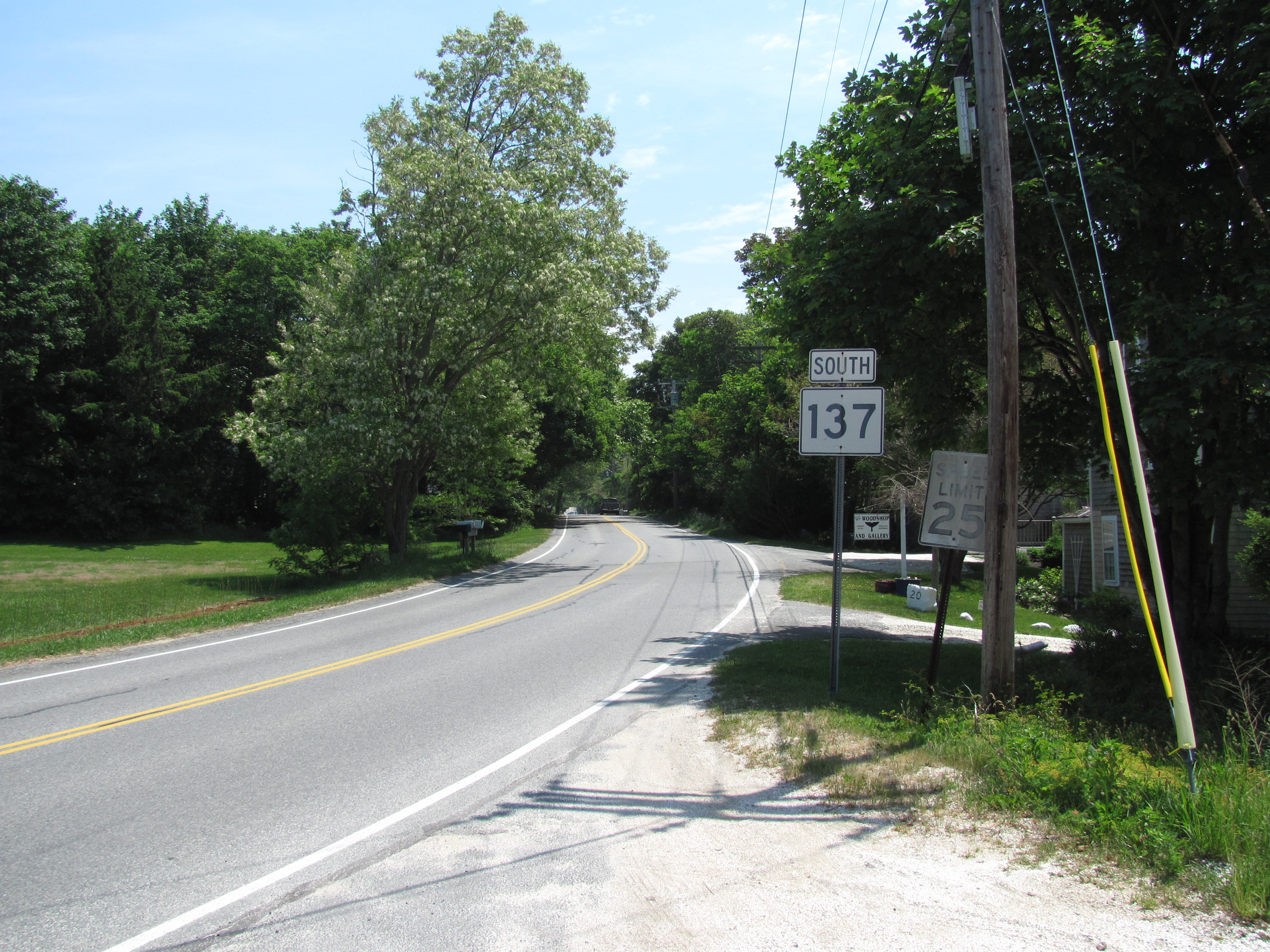
Route 137 southbound from Route 6A in Brewster

The route continues northwest as the main northwest–southeast road through East Harwich, passing a local cemetery, and leaving downtown East Harwich. After passing a large complex, Route 137 enters an intersection with Route 39 (Orleans Road). The route continues northwest through Harwich, becoming a residential street through town. After Pleasant Bay Road, Route 137 enters a partial cloverleaf interchange (exit 85) with US 6 (Mid-Cape Highway). After the interchange, Route 137 crosses between Cahoon and Mill ponds, continuing into the town of Brewster. Now known as Long Pond Road, Route 137 continues northwest through Brewster.

The route soon reaches the community of South Brewster, becoming the main street on the far eastern side of the community. After the intersection with Brady Cartway, Route 137 turns west through Brewster, crossing the Cape Cod Rail Trail and the former South Brewster Railroad Station. A two-lane road through Brewster, the route enters an intersection with Route 124 (Harwich Road), which ends nearby. Continuing northwest, Route 137 enters an intersection with Route 6A (Main Street). The right-of-way ends at the junction, near Cape Cod Bay.

== Major intersections ==
The entire route is in Barnstable County.

| Location | mi | km | Destinations | Notes |
|---|---|---|---|---|
| Chatham | 0.000 | 0.000 | Route 28 – South Harwich, Orleans | Southern terminus |
| Harwich | 1.881 | 3.027 | Route 39 – Harwich, Hyannis, East Harwich, Orleans | |
| Harwich | 3.097– 3.221 | 4.984– 5.184 | US 6 (Mid-Cape Highway) – Orleans, Provincetown, Hyannis, Boston | Partial cloverleaf interchange; exit 85 on US 6 (Mid-Cape Highway) |
| Brewster | 6.657 | 10.713 | Route 124 – Harwich Center, Orleans | |
| Brewster | 6.833 | 10.997 | Route 6A – Barnstable, Provincetown | Northern terminus |
1.000 mi = 1.609 km; 1.000 km = 0.621 mi
