= Claire Saltonstall Bikeway =

Bikeway in Massachusetts, US

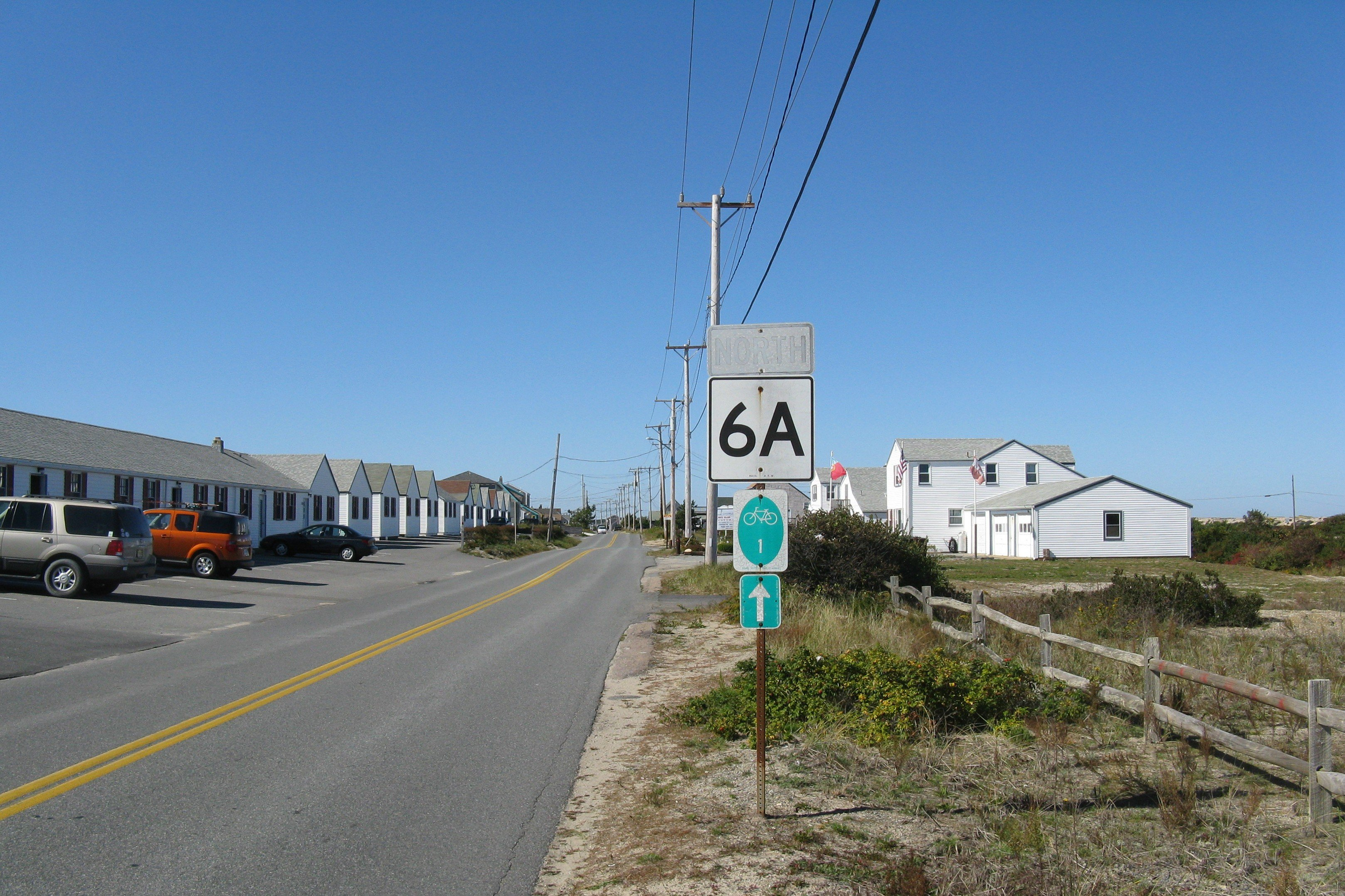
- On Route 6A northbound in Truro
- Length: 135 mi (217 km)
- Designation: Bike Route 1
- Trailheads: Boston, Provincetown
- Use: Cycling

The Claire Saltonstall Bikeway, also known as the Boston to Cape Cod Bikeway, is a 135-mile bikeway marked as Bike Route 1 that starts on the Charles River Bike Path near Boston University in Boston, Massachusetts and winds along Boston's Emerald Necklace, using mostly back roads and bike paths with occasional stretches of secondary highways. It ends in Provincetown, Massachusetts. The bikeway was named on July 17, 1978, in memory of Claire Saltonstall, the daughter of Senator William L. Saltonstall. Claire was killed by the driver of an automobile in 1974 while she was riding her bicycle. Senator Saltonstall was a sponsor of bicycle safety legislation and was instrumental in developing the bikeway. Dual signs were erected along the route shortly after the bikeway opened, one with a picture of a bicycle in a green background and the green number 1 below the picture, and another rectangular sign with the words Claire Saltonstall Bikeway below that. Few of the original signs survive today, however, and new signs were erected in the summer of 2018.

== Route Description ==
This back road bikeway follows various state parkways, highways, and town roads and bike paths. Nearly all of the roads along the bikeway are paved and leave enough room to comfortably ride in a bike lane. The only exception is on the Sagamore Bridge where riders must walk their bicycles due to state safety regulations. It passes near many state parks south of Boston, including Blue Hills Reservation, Ames Nowell State Park, Pilgrim Memorial State Park, Myles Standish State Forest, Scusset Beach State Reservation, Nickerson State Park, and Cape Cod National Seashore. Turn by turn directions are given for the three major sections of the bikeway: Greater Boston, Metro South and SE Mass, and Cape Cod going from Boston to Cape Cod.

== Boston Area ==
The first 13 miles of the bikeway begin along the banks of the Charles River near Boston University. The route passes by the school over US 20 and follows its way into the Fenway neighborhood. The bikeway follows down the Riverway bike paths, passing the Longwood Medical Area, down to the Emerald Necklace. The route intersects at Route 9 and continues down the Jamaicaway. The bikeway has a short congruency with the Arborway before exiting at Centre Street. Going southward, the bikeway flows from Centre Street to VFW Parkway. You must then exit to West Roxbury Parkway at the rotary and pass by the Bellevue MBTA station. Going northward, the bikeway passes by the Bellevue stop and merges onto Centre Street. The route continues down the West Roxbury Parkway, Enneking Parkway, and Turtle Pond Parkway before turning onto the Neponset Valley Parkway, which runs through the Readville section of the city. The bikeway exits onto Blue Hill Avenue onto Route 138 and the route makes its way past the Blue Hills Reservation and I-93 into Canton.

County	Location	mi	km	Destinations	Notes
Suffolk	Boston	0.0	0.0	Dr. Paul Dudley White Bike Path	Northern end of route; use Silber Way pedestrian bridge to start route on Silber Way
Suffolk	Boston	0.2	0.32	Cummington Mall	Turn right, follow one way to Babbit Street, then turn left onto Street Mary's Street (southbound only)
Suffolk	Boston	0.6	0.97	Park Drive	turn left and follow to Riverway (to use this route to Charles River, use Carlton Street to Bay State Rd., then use Back Street to pedestrian bridge)
Suffolk	Boston	1.0	1.6	Emerald Necklace	Follow marked bike paths (enters Brookline)
Norfolk	Brookline	2.0	3.2	Route 9	Continue down Emerald Necklace to Arborway traffic circle (re-entering Boston)
Suffolk	Boston	3.8	6.1	Arborway	Use Arborway to first traffic circle, use 1st exit onto Centre Street
Suffolk	Boston	5.2	8.4	VFW Parkway	Use to next traffic circle, take 2nd exit onto W.Roxbury Parkway (southbound route only)
Suffolk	Boston	6.5	10.5	Bellevue	Southbound route: take 2nd exit to continue on W. Roxbury Parkway; Northbound route: take 1st exit onto Centre Street follow to Arborway)
Suffolk	Boston	7.5	12.1	Enneking Parkway	Continue straight, continues as Turtle Pond Parkway, Neponset Valley Parkway
Suffolk	Boston	10.3	16.6	Milton Street	Continue straight, then slight right onto Neponset Valley Parkway
Norfolk	Milton	11.8	19.0	Route 138 Blue Hill Avenue	Northern end of concurrency with MA 138 (northbound riders: continue straight on Route 138 north to the next light, turn left on Milton Street)
1.000 mi = 1.609 km; 1.000 km = 0.621 mi: Concurrency terminus

== Blue Hills to Sagamore Bridge ==
The route then travels for 55 miles in metro-south Boston and in suburbs in Southeastern Massachusetts. The route travels past the Blue Hills on MA 138 in Milton and continues into Canton, then turns down Randolph St. which becomes Canton St. in Randolph. It is a concurrent with MA 28 into Avon, where it exits onto E. High St. heading towards Boundary St. and eventually N. Quincy St. in Brockton. It intersects MA 123 and MA 27 before continuing straight to the access road for Massasoit Community College. At the end of the access road, it turns left onto Thatcher St and continues as Elm St. in East Bridgewater. It then turns left onto North Central Street and crosses MA 18, becoming Central Street as it continues toward Chestnut St., Bridge St., and Crescent St. It then follows down Washington St. until its next turn onto Pond St. which leads into Halifax. It then turns onto Elm St. and continues to Pine St. where it turns east on MA 106 for a short while and then turns onto Carver St. It eventually turns into South St. then onto Franklin St., continuing into Plympton. It travels down Center St. towards MA 58 where it is joined going south into the town center before turning onto Mayflower St. It continues on Colchester Rd. and Brook St. before becoming Elm St. in Kingston where it joins MA 80 for four miles heading down into Plymouth. It turns onto Carver St. and continues past the big intersection (use the rightmost lane) before turning onto Summer St. toward downtown Plymouth. It turns onto MA 3A for half a mile before exiting onto South St. and eventually becoming Long Pond Rd. It passes under MA 3 and continues down toward the Myles Standish State Forest and Plymouth South High School before merging left onto Hedges Pond Rd., where the route will re-meet Route 3A and continue straight onto State Rd. towards the Sagamore Bridge in Bourne.

Riders must use the Sagamore Bridge to cross the Cape Cod Canal, and they must walk their bicycles across the bridge. Access to the bridge is available by going straight on Canal Street just past the Sagamore Park and Ride lot on the right.

County	Location	mi	km	Destinations	Notes
Norfolk	Canton	13.4	21.6	I-93 / US 1	exit 2 on I-93
Norfolk	Canton	15.0	24.1	Randolph St.	southern end of concurrency with MA 138
Norfolk	Randolph	18.4	29.6	Route 28	northern end of concurrency with MA 28
Norfolk	Avon	22.2	35.7	E. High Street	southern end of concurrency with MA 28 use Spring St. and Boundary St. in Holbrook to continue on route
Plymouth	Brockton	24.6	39.6	North Quincy Street	
Plymouth	Brockton	27.0	43.5	Route 123	access to Signature Healthcare Brockton Hospital
Plymouth	Brockton	27.4	44.1	Route 27	continue straight onto Massasoit Blvd.
Plymouth	Brockton	28.2	45.4	Thatcher Street	continuation south into East Bridgewater
Plymouth	East Bridgewater	31.4	50.5	North Central Street	
Plymouth	East Bridgewater	32.0	51.5	Route 18	continue straight on Central St.
Plymouth	East Bridgewater	33.2	53.4	Chestnut Street	use to Bridge St. then bear left onto Crescent St. then right onto Washington St.
Plymouth	East Bridgewater	35.3	56.8	Pond Street	continuation into Halifax
Plymouth	Halifax	37.1	59.7	Elm Street	take right and ride to Pine St.
Plymouth	Halifax	38.2	61.5	Route 106	western end of concurrency with MA 106
Plymouth	Halifax	38.8	62.4	Carver Street	eastern end of concurrency with MA 106 becomes South St.
Plymouth	Halifax	39.6	63.7	Franklin Street	continues into Plympton as Center St.
Plymouth	Plympton	42.2	67.9	Route 58	northern end of concurrency with MA 58
Plymouth	Plympton	43.2	69.5	Mayflower Street	southern end of concurrency with MA 58
Plymouth	Plympton	44.0	70.8	Colchester Street	continues as Brook St. into Kingston
Plymouth	Kingston	46.5	74.8	Route 80 Bishops Highway	western end of concurrency with MA 80
Plymouth	Kingston	49.0	78.9	Route 80 Plympton Street	continuation into Plymouth
Plymouth	Plymouth	50.5	81.3	Carver Road	eastern end of concurrency with MA 80 turn left then use right lane to continue straight on Carver Rd.
Plymouth	Plymouth	51.3	82.6	Summer Street	turn left, then pass through set of lights. turn right at end, then slight left to MA 3A
Plymouth	Plymouth	53.1	85.5	Route 3A Sandwich Street	northern end of concurrency with MA 3A use 3A south to Sandwich St. for access to Beth Israel Deaconess Hospital – Plymouth
Plymouth	Plymouth	53.3	85.8	South Street	southern end of concurrency with MA 3A continues as Long Pond Rd. after MA 3
Plymouth	Plymouth	63.4	102.0	Hedges Pond Road	
Plymouth	Plymouth	65.2	104.9	State Road	avoid MA 3A go straight at lights. continuation into Bourne
Barnstable	Bourne	67.8	109.1	Canal Street	go straight at lights. use sidewalk after Sagamore Park and Ride for access to Sagamore Bridge
1.000 mi = 1.609 km; 1.000 km = 0.621 mi: Concurrency terminus

== Cape Cod ==
The bikeway continues following back roads and bike paths for 67 miles on Cape Cod starting in Bourne, coming off the Sagamore Bridge onto Adams St. and Sandwich St. which becomes MA 6A. The route turns onto MA 130 heading into Sandwich and passes under US 6, then turns onto Service Rd. passing MA 149 and continuing into Barnstable. It joins MA 132 for a short concurrency before turning onto Phinney's Ln. as it rejoins MA 6A. It continues into Yarmouth and Dennis before turning onto Setucket Road and Mayfair Road, then joins the Cape Cod Rail Trail through the towns of Harwich, Brewster, Orleans, Eastham, and Wellfleet. The bikeway then makes its way around US 6 through side streets in Truro and finally comes to an end down Commercial Street MA 6A in downtown Provincetown.

The entire route is in Barnstable County.

Location	mi	km	Destinations	Notes
Bourne	68.7	110.6	Adams Road to Route 6A Sandwich Road	south end of Sagamore Bridge at US 6
Bourne	68.9	110.9	Route 6A	western end of concurrency
Sandwich	69.9	112.5	Route 130	northern terminus of MA 130 eastern end of concurrency with MA 6A
Sandwich	72.9	117.3	Service Road	Continues into Barnstable
Barnstable	79.4	127.8	Route 149 / US 6	roundabout intersection (take 1st exit southbound)(3rd exit northbound)
Barnstable	82.8	133.3	Route 132	northern end of concurrency with MA 132
Barnstable	83.7	134.7	Phinney's Road	southern end of concurrency with MA 132 (use Attuck's Ln. going north for better traffic flow)
Barnstable	85.5	137.6	Route 6A Main Street	western end of concurrency with MA 6A
Yarmouth	90.9	146.3	Setucket Road	eastern end of concurrency with MA 6A
Dennis	91.9	147.9	Mayfair Road	follow to end, turn right on Old Bass River Rd. to CCRT
Dennis	94.5	152.1	Cape Cod Rail Trail	stay to right except to pass, give audible signals when passing, stop and look before crossing intersections
Wellfleet	116.9	188.1	Lecount Hollow Road	turn right off CCRT, follow street then turn left onto to Long Pond Rd. continue on Long Pond Rd. over US 6
Wellfleet	121.6	195.7	Main Street	follow Main Street, continues as Pole Dike Rd. and Bound Brook Island Rd. into Truro
Truro	128.0	206.0	Truro Center Rd.	slight left, then make another slight left onto Castle Rd.
Truro	130.1	209.4	US 6	southern end of concurrency with US 6
Truro	131.2	211.1	Route 6A	northern end of concurrency with US 6
Provincetown	137.9	221.9	Conwell St. to Race Point Rd.	southern end of bikeway (for ferry access, continue straight and turn left on Standish St. to MacMillan Pier)
1.000 mi = 1.609 km; 1.000 km = 0.621 mi: Concurrency terminus
