= Cape Cod Rail Trail =

Rail trail in Massachusetts, US

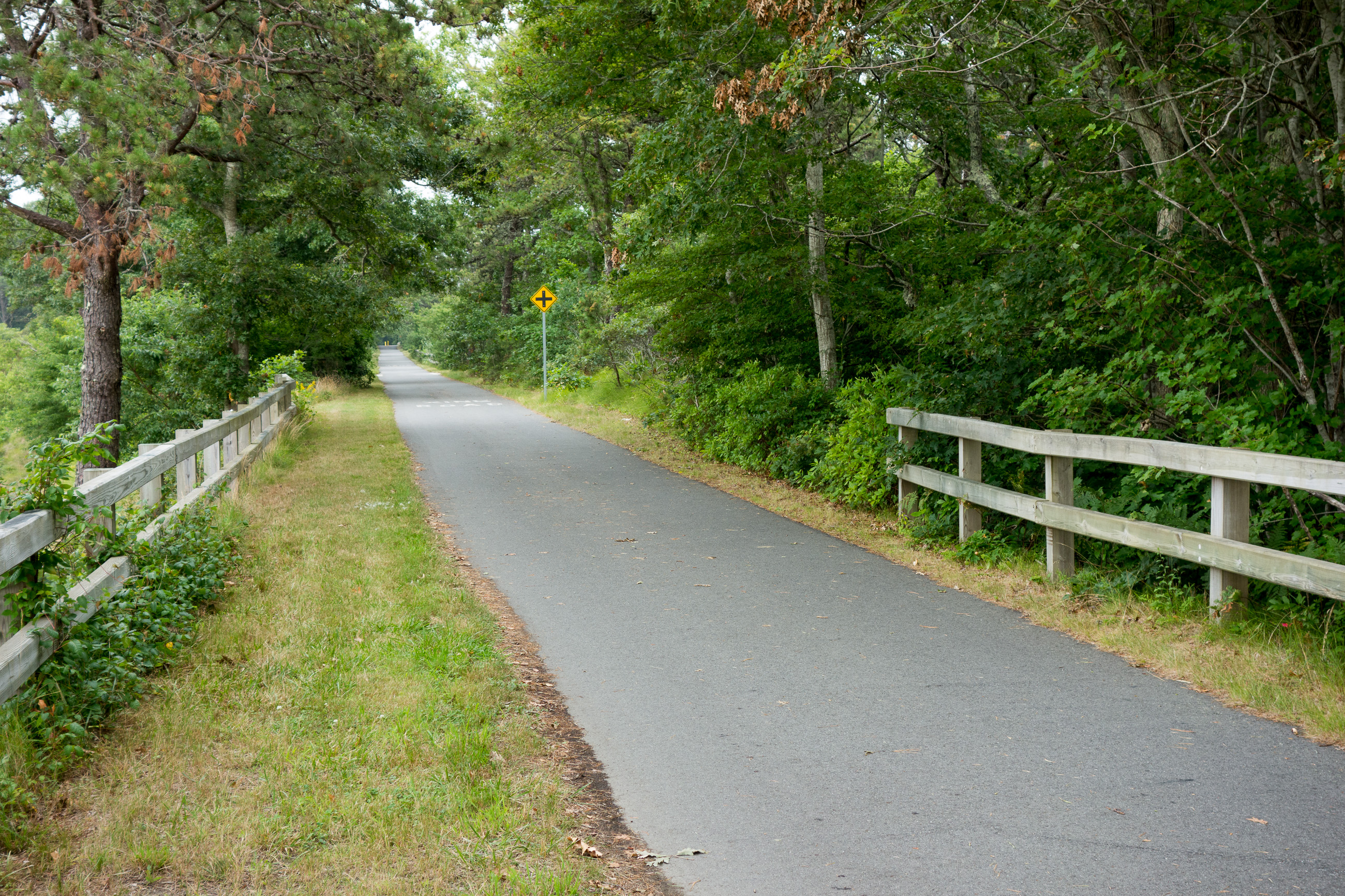
- The trail in Harwich, Massachusetts
- Length: 25.5 miles
- Location: Barnstable County
- Established: 1980
- Designation: Massachusetts state park
- Trailheads: Lecount Hollow Road, Wellfleet; Station Avenue, South Yarmouth
- Use: Hiking, cycling, roller blading, horseback riding, cross-country skiing
- Difficulty: Easy
- Season: Year-round
- Hazards: Deer ticks, poison ivy, road crossings
- Surface: Paved surface
- Right of way: Former railroad line
- Maintainer: Department of Conservation and Recreation
- Website: Cape Cod Rail Trail

Cape Cod Rail Trail map
- Green: Complete; Orange: Under Construction

The Cape Cod Rail Trail (CCRT) is a 25.5-mile (41.0 km) paved rail trail located on Cape Cod in Massachusetts. The trail route passes through the towns of Yarmouth, Dennis, Harwich, Brewster, Orleans, Eastham, and Wellfleet. It connects to the 6-plus mile (10 km) Old Colony Rail Trail leading to Chatham, the 2 mile Yarmouth multi-use trail, and 8 miles (13 km) of trails within Nickerson State Park. Short side trips on roads lead to national seashore beaches including Coast Guard Beach at the end of the Nauset Bike Trail in Cape Cod National Seashore. The trail is part of the Claire Saltonstall Bikeway.

== History ==
The original rail line from Yarmouth to Orleans was constructed by the Cape Cod Central Railroad (1861–1868), which was later incorporated into the Old Colony Railroad in 1872, and finished the line to Provincetown in 1873. The railroad was later incorporated into the New York, New Haven & Hartford Railroad in 1893. The New Haven Railroad merged into Penn Central in 1968: it went bankrupt by 1970. The corridor was purchased by the Commonwealth of Massachusetts in 1976, and a portion of the right-of-way was converted to the Cape Cod Rail Trail by the Massachusetts Department of Conservation and Recreation in 1980. The current owner, the Massachusetts Department of Transportation, leases the line from Station Avenue in Yarmouth to US Route 6 in Wellfleet to the Massachusetts Department of Conservation and Recreation for trail use.

In the 1980s, the process of creating the Cape Cod Rail Trail was used as a model for creating the Bruce Freeman Rail Trail.

== Route description ==
=== Yarmouth trailhead to Nickerson State Park ===
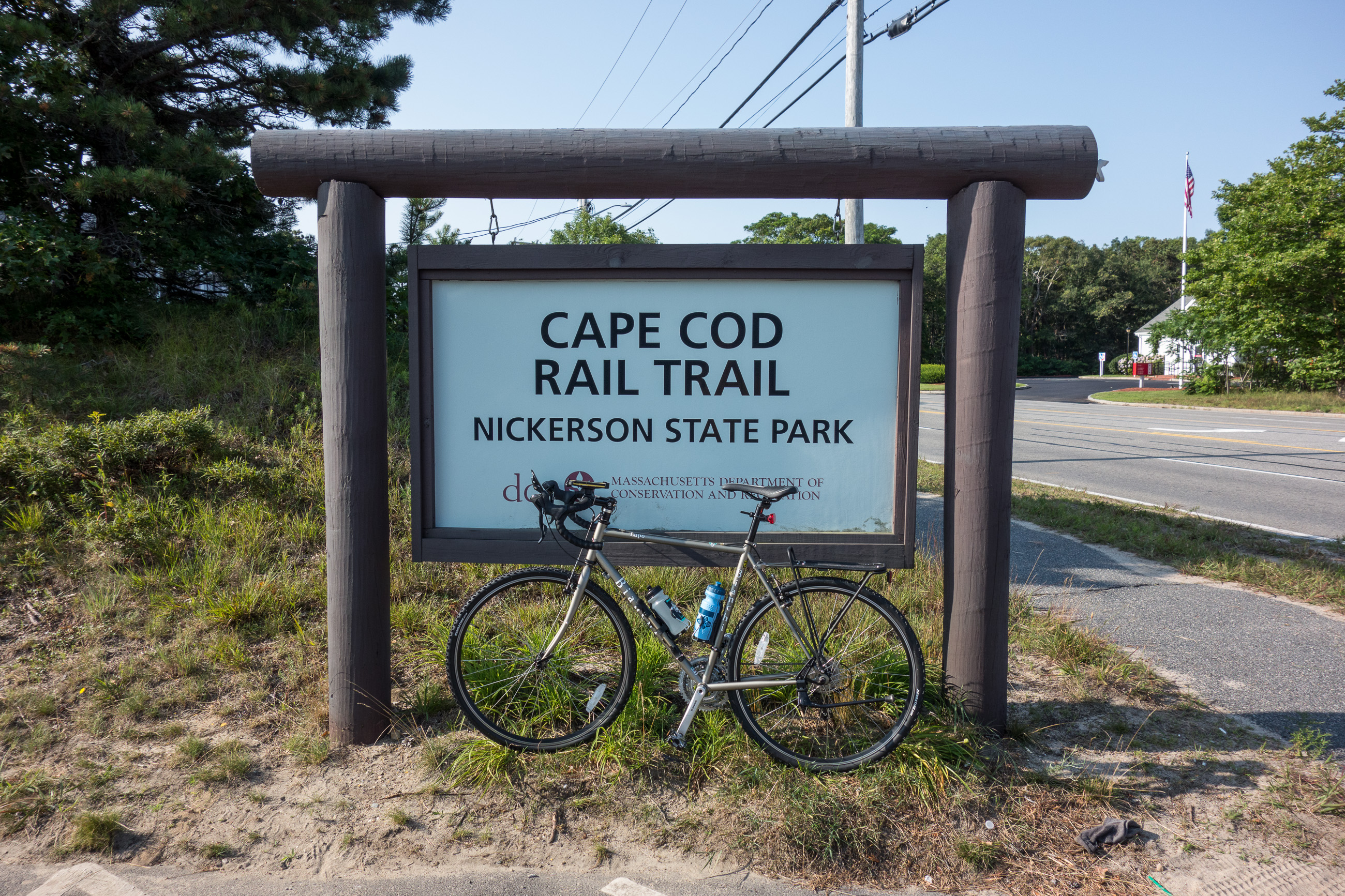
A road bike stands poised to ride at the start of the Cape Cod Rail Trail in Nickerson State Park, Cape Cod.

The trail begins in Yarmouth at Station Avenue. This trailhead has a parking area and is just south of exit 75 on US 6. West of here, the trail crosses over Station Ave on an overpass and connects to Peter Homer Park and continues as the town-owned Yarmouth multi-use trail, which runs for 2 miles to Higgins Crowell Road. The first 5 miles of trail run through industrial and residential areas of Yarmouth and Dennis, and include a new trail bridge over the Bass River. It roughly parallels Great Western Road during this section, crossing it twice.

The trail then enters Harwich as the landscape turns to houses and agricultural land before turning gradually north and intersecting with the Old Colony Rail Trail at a bike rotary between miles 3 and 4. The rotary has maps and benches in its center for users of the trail. North of the rotary, the trail passes through a wooded area and crosses Route 6 via an overpass. Another parking area is located at the trail's intersection with Headwaters Drive, north of Route 6. It crosses Massachusetts Route 124 at mile 5 and runs along it until mile 7, passing several ponds and entering Brewster at mile 6.

The CCRT crosses Massachusetts Route 137 at mile 8 and then runs south of central Brewster. A parking area is located at Route 137, before the trail enters Nickerson State Park just past mile 10. It is in the park for about two-thirds of a mile, intersecting some of its trails, then crosses Massachusetts Route 6A by an underpass as it leaves the park. A parking lot is located near the Route 6A crossing.

=== Nickerson State Park to Wellfleet trailhead ===
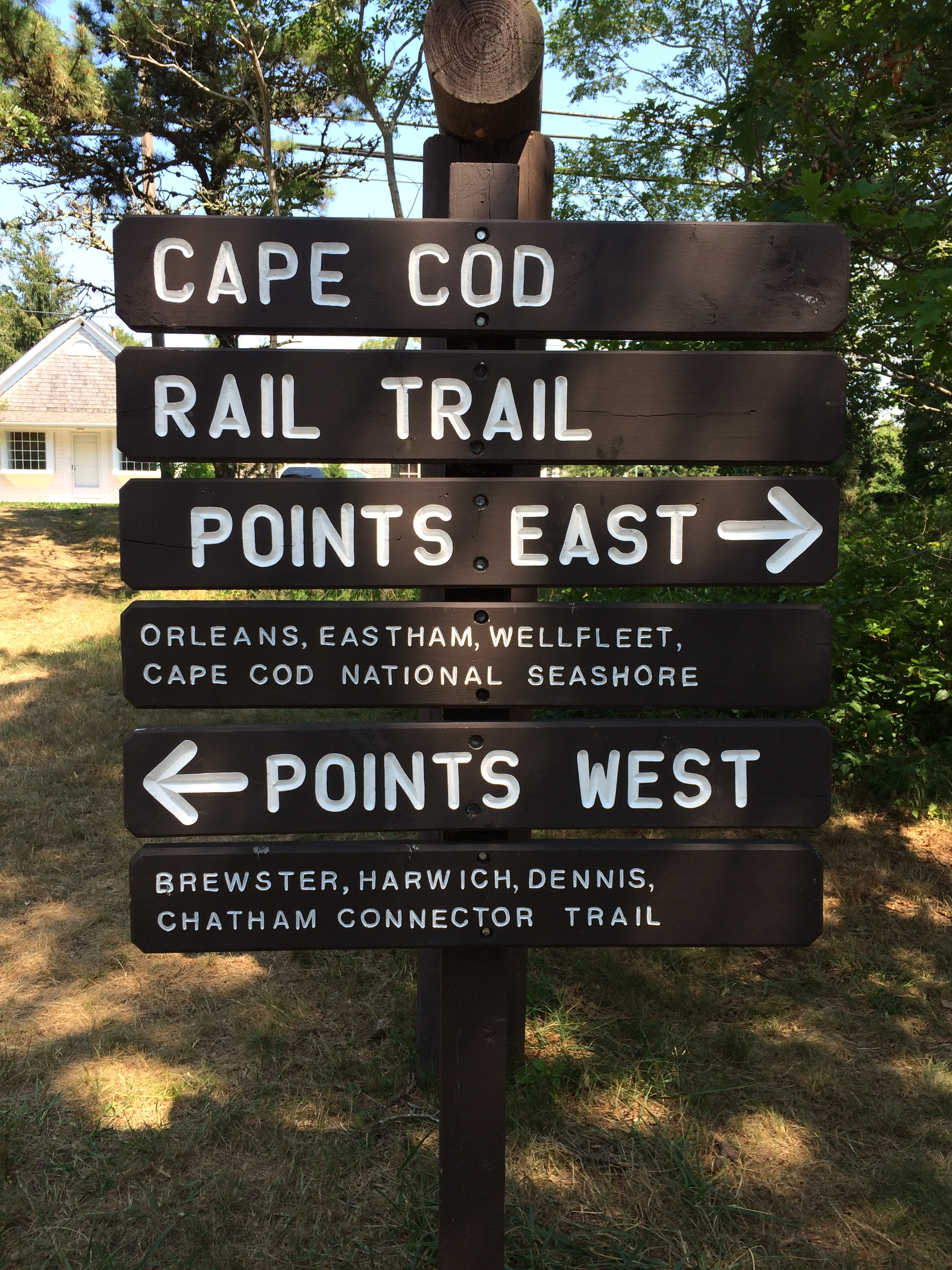
Sign describing points east and west of Nickerson State Park along Cape Cod Rail Trail

The trail continues to cross Namskaket Creek into Orleans between miles 11 and 12. The crossing of Route 6 between miles 12 and 13, near exit 89 on the highway, constitutes the trail's only (and brief) on-road section. The trail follows Salty Ridge Road to West Road, where it turns right over the Route 6 overpass. It then turns left and leaves West Road heading northeast into downtown Orleans. The CCRT crosses Main Street just past mile 13; this area in downtown has several bike shops and dining establishments. A parking area is located off of Old Colony Way, named for the former railroad that the trail runs on. The landscape changes to a less dense residential area as it leaves downtown. The third crossing of Route 6 is an overpass just before mile 14 and just east of the Orleans rotary.

The trail enters Eastham shortly after this, at which point there is a large salt marsh, Boat Meadow Creek, on the west side of the trail. It was at this location that a rudimentary canal, Jeremiah's Gutter, had existed in the 1700s, allowing passage from Cape Cod Bay to the Cove area of Orleans. Around mile marker 15, the trail enters the residential section of Eastham, crossing Gov. Prence Road. The trail remains relatively straight through most of Eastham, and at-grade road crossings are fairly frequent. Locust Road, between miles 16 and 17, is a signed bike route to the Nauset Bicycle Trail (which brings cyclists and pedestrians to Coast Guard Beach) and the Salt Pond Visitor Center, as well as other points in the Cape Cod National Seashore. In the North Eastham area, just west of the trail's intersection with Brackett Road, there are bike shops as well as delis and a Ben and Jerry's ice cream shop. North of Brackett Road, the trail runs closer to Route 6 and several motels and restaurants on the east side of the highway are connected directly to the trail.

The CCRT enters Wellfleet near mile 19. Sparse residential development lies west of the trail, while the east side of the trail is fronted by a power line right-of-way, with undeveloped National Seashore land beyond that. North of mile 21, the trail intersects Marconi Beach Road, which leads to Marconi Beach and the Marconi Station site. Sparse development continues as the trail passess Lecount Hollow Road in Wellfleet. The road provides access to several Wellfleet town beaches. As of 2023, the trail terminated after 25.5 miles at the Wellfleet Hollow State Campground.

== Expansion and development ==
Efforts to extend the bike path from the Wellfleet trailhead north to Provincetown have been under discussion for many years. Four possible routes were identified in 2011: a scenic corridor through the National Seashore, a share-the-road corridor of back roads west of Route 6, a corridor that follows the former railroad right of way (some of which is now privately owned), and a route that would take the bike path north along a power line right of way from South Wellfleet into Truro and then along Route 6 into Provincetown. Construction has largely been halted past Wellfleet as of 2023.

Westward expansion is planned to Route 132.

In 2024, MassTrails grants for Phase 3 construction in Yarmouth and Barnstable, and Phase 4 design in Barnstable to the Sandwich town line, were awarded.

== Crossings ==
All crossings in Barnstable County, Massachusetts.

Town	Crossing	Notes
Wellfleet	Lecount Hollow Rd.	Northeastern Terminus. Parking area. Restroom.
Wellfleet	Cemetery Rd.	
Wellfleet	Marconi Beach Rd.	
Eastham	Nauset Rd.	
Eastham	Brackett Rd.	Restroom.
Eastham	Old Orchard Rd.	
Eastham	US 6	Underpass
Eastham	Kingsbury Beach Rd.	
Eastham	Locust Rd.	
Eastham	Samoset Rd.	
Eastham	Crosby Village Rd.	
Eastham	Bridge Rd.	
Eastham	Governor Prence Rd.	
Orleans	Rock Harbor Rd.	Overpass
Orleans	US 6	Overpass
Orleans	Canal Rd.	
Orleans	Jones Rd.	
Orleans	Locust Rd.	
Orleans	Main St.	Parking area.
Orleans	West. Rd.	Short on-road overlap
Orleans	US 6	Overpass
Orleans	Salty Ridge Rd.	Short on-road overlap
Orleans	Seaview Rd.	
Brewster	Mitchell Ln.	
Brewster	Route 6A	Underpass. Parking area. Restrooms.
Brewster	Ober Rd.	
Brewster	Millstone Rd.	
Brewster	Villages Dr.	Underpass
Brewster	Thad Ellis Rd.	
Brewster	Underpass Rd.	
Brewster	School Dr.	
Brewster	Route 137	Parking area.
Brewster	Fishermen's Landing Rd.	
Brewster/ Harwich	Route 124	(twice in a row)
Harwich	Sequattom Rd.	
Harwich	Route 124	
Harwich	Headwaters Dr.	Parking area.
Harwich	US 6	Overpass
Harwich	Queen Anne Rd.	
Harwich	Old Colony Rail Trail	
Harwich	Main St.	Underpass
Harwich	Lothrop Ave.	
Harwich	Great Western Rd.	
Harwich	Bells Neck Rd.	
Harwich	Depot St.	
Dennis	Great Western Rd.	
Dennis	So. Gages Way	
Dennis	Route 134	Overpass. Parking area.
Dennis	Main St.	Parking area.
Dennis/Yarmouth	Bass River	Bridge
Yarmouth	North Main St.	
Yarmouth	Dupont Ave	
Yarmouth	Station Ave.	Overpass. Parking area.
Yarmouth	Peter Homer Park	Southwestern terminus; joins existing trail to Higgins Crowell Road.

== See also ==
- Old Colony Rail Trail – between Harwich and Chatham
- Shining Sea Bikeway – between North Falmouth and Woods Hole
