= Barnstable Comedy Club =

Community theater in Barnstable, Massachusetts, founded 1922

- Location: Barnstable Village, Massachusetts, United States
- Owner: Barnstable Comedy Club (non-profit)
- Type: Community theater

Construction
- Opened: 1922

Website
- barnstablecomedyclub.org

The Barnstable Comedy Club (BCC) is a non-profit community theater located in Barnstable Village on Cape Cod, Massachusetts. Founded in 1922, it is one of the oldest continuously operating community theaters in the United States. It performs in the Barnstable Village Hall, a historic building it has owned since 1961.

== History ==
The Village Hall that houses the theater was built in 1912, funded and owned by the Barnstable Woman's Club, and intended as a venue for community events. In 1922 a theater group that had been meeting nearby at the Old Barnstable Inn presented Lady Windermere's Fan under the name "Barnstable Comedy Club" — the first time that name appeared on tickets. Reserved seats for the inaugural production cost 75 cents, including a federal war tax.

The club purchased the Village Hall from the Barnstable Woman's Club in 1961. It incorporated after the purchase, and in 1975 was granted status as a non-profit, tax-exempt organization. The building is still known as the Village Hall in honor of its original owners' wishes.

In August 2022 the club celebrated its centennial with a community party, marking one hundred years and 284 productions.

== Notable productions and members ==
The club's repertoire has included productions of Our Town, Death of a Salesman, The King and I, Carousel, and Grease, among others. The club has been associated with notable figures from the arts world. Author Kurt Vonnegut, who lived in Barnstable Village from 1951 to 1971, was a member of the theater community. Russell Meriwether Hughes, known professionally as La Meri and described as "the leading American authority on ethnic dance," was also associated with the club.

== Venue ==
The club performs in the Barnstable Village Hall on Route 6A (Old King's Highway) in Barnstable Village. The BCC is an all-volunteer organization and holds open auditions for each production.
