= East Harwich Airport =

- IATA: none; ICAO: none

Summary
- Operator: Private
- Location: Harwich, Massachusetts
- Built: Completed 1946
- In use: 1950s-1960s
- Occupants: Private
- Elevation AMSL: 79 ft (24 m)
- Coordinates: 41°42′44.42″N 70°0′49.17″W
- Interactive map of East Harwich Airport

Runways
Direction	Length		Surface
Direction	ft	m	Surface
	1,800	549	Turf, formerly Gravel/Sand

East Harwich Airport was an airfield operational in the mid-20th century. The airfield was described as being located in a small field off Route 39 in Harwich, Massachusetts. The airport was also known as Bascom Field, East Harwich Airdrome and Cashens Airport. The airport was owned and used by Charles P.H. "Chief" Bascom, as well as his close friend, Ralph "Gump" Cashen. The east-west 1000’ runway is still in existence, however the town has created a paper road to the south side of the airport, titled Dorrance Drive, and the runway may be developed. The land has been subdivided. The original hangar is still intact, but is severely dilapidated.
