= Massachusetts Route 124 =

State highway in Barnstable County, Massachusetts, US

Route 124
- Route 124 highlighted in red

Route information
- Maintained by MassDOT
- Length: 6.800 mi (10.944 km)
- Existed: 1951–present

Major junctions
- South end: Route 28 in Harwich
- US 6 in Harwich
- North end: Route 6A in Brewster

Location
- Country: United States
- State: Massachusetts
- Counties: Barnstable

Highway system
- Massachusetts State Highway System; Interstate; US; State
← Route 123	→ Route 125

Route 124 is a 6.8-mile-long (10.9 km) north–south state highway located in the towns of Harwich and Brewster in the U.S. state of Massachusetts. Its southern terminus is at Route 28 in Harwich and its northern terminus is at Route 6A in Brewster.

== Route description ==
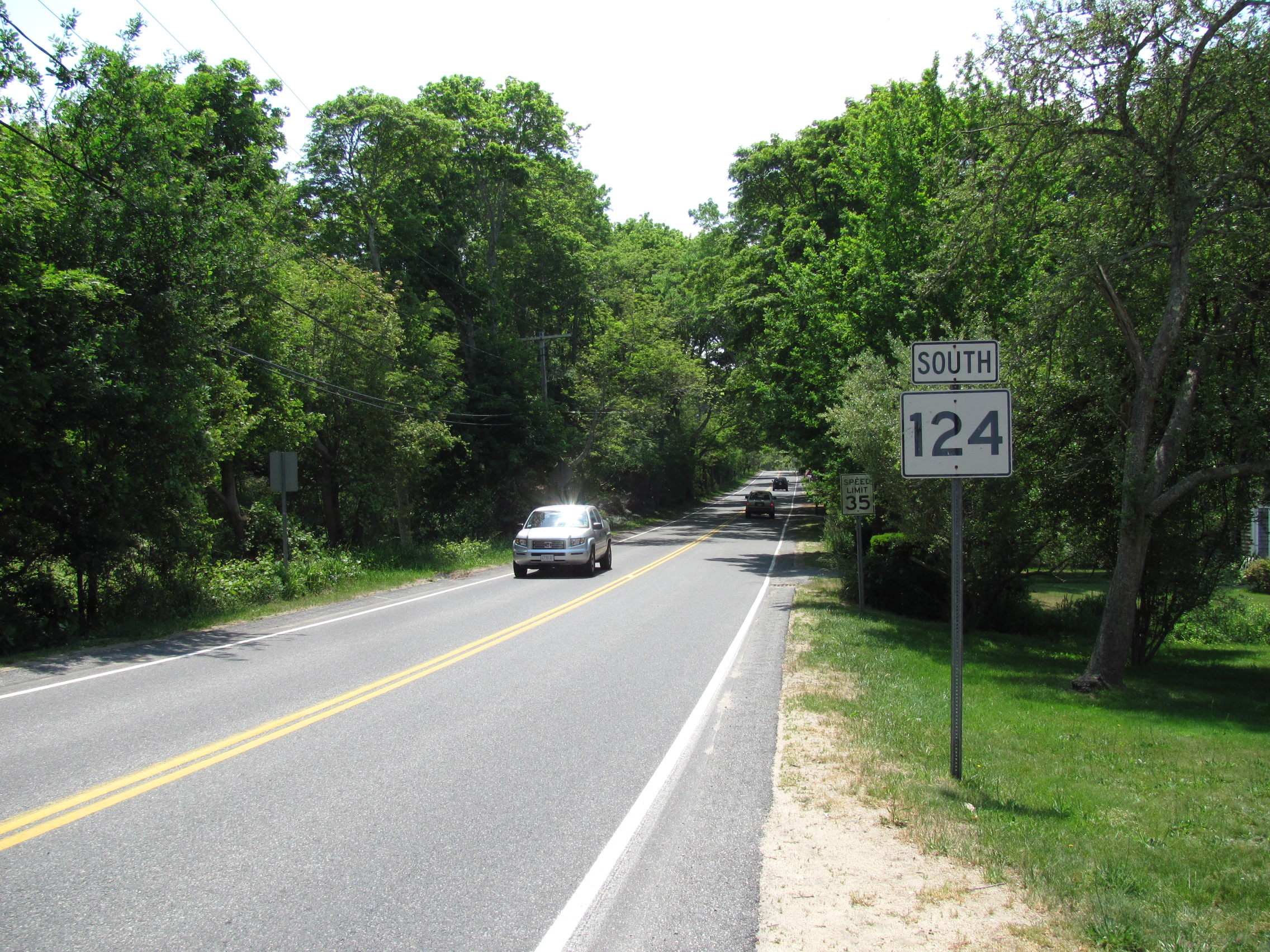
Southbound from Route 6A in Brewster

Route 124 begins at the intersection of Route 28, overlapping Route 39. It leaves Route 39 next to the First Parish Church in downtown Harwich. After 1.3 miles (2.1 km), the road passes the Mid-Cape Highway at Exit 82 off the Mid-Cape Highway. The road crosses into Brewster just north of a pass between Seymour Pond, Hinckley's Pond, and Long Pond, 1.5 miles (2.41 km) north of the Mid-Cape Highway. After 0.5 miles (0.80 km) the Cape Cod Rail Trail bike path crosses over and follows alongside the road for another 1.5 miles (2.41 km). The road crosses Route 137 after 2 miles (3.22 km). After less than 0.5 miles (0.80 km), the road ends at Route 6A and Harwich Road.

== History ==
Route 124 was formerly designated Route 24, prior to the completion of the initial stretch of the current Route 24 freeway in 1951. When the freeway was given the Route 24 designation, the existing Route 24 was renumbered to 124.

== Major intersections ==
The entire route is in Barnstable County.

Location	mi	km	Destinations	Notes
Harwich	0.000	0.000	Route 28 – Harwichport Route 39 begins	Southern terminus; southern terminus of Route 39
Harwich	1.673	2.692	Route 39 north – South Harwich, Harwichport	Northern end of Route 39 concurrency
Harwich	2.618– 2.851	4.213– 4.588	US 6 (Mid-Cape Highway) – Orleans, Provincetown, Hyannis, Boston	Exit 82 on US 6; partial cloverleaf interchange
Brewster	6.405	10.308	Route 137 – East Harwich, South Chatham	
Brewster	6.800	10.944	Route 6A – Barnstable, Provincetown	Northern terminus
1.000 mi = 1.609 km; 1.000 km = 0.621 mi: Concurrency terminus
