= Jeremiah's Gutter =

Coordinates: 41°47′50.7″N 69°59′0.7″W

Jeremiah's Gutter ran along the border of Eastham and Orleans.

Jeremiah's Gutter, also called Jeremy’s Dream was a canal located on the border of Orleans and Eastham, Massachusetts, the first canal to cut across the peninsula of Cape Cod. It connected Cape Cod Bay in the west to the Atlantic Ocean in the east. It was active for over 100 years, although it gradually fell out of use and was replaced by the Cape Cod Canal.

== History ==
The eastern side of Cape Cod has always been treacherous to shipping. On 26 April 1717, a 1.5-mile (2.4 km) passage on land owned by Jeremiah Smith between Boat Meadow Creek on the side of Cape Cod Bay and Town Cove to the east was deepened by a storm. The resulting canal was very shallow, allowing a maximum of 20-ton boats. In 1804, it was widened and improved which allowed use during the War of 1812. Proposals for a new canal began to take priority in the late 1800s, and the canal began to fall into disrepair. In 1916, the Cape Cod Canal opened between Bourne and Sandwich, Massachusetts.

The only remains of Jeremiah's Gutter are a river and cut through the marsh. These can be viewed from the Cape Cod Rail Trail about 0.3 miles north of the Rock Harbor Road parking. All traces of the canal from the eastern end near Town Cove have been removed by the construction of the rotary at U.S. Route 6 and by the construction of homes.
