= Massachusetts Route 132 =

State highway in Barnstable County, Massachusetts, US

Route 132
- Iyannough Road
- Route 132 highlighted in red

Route information
- Maintained by MassDOT
- Length: 3.69 mi (5.94 km)
- Existed: by 1929–present

Major junctions
- South end: Route 28 in Hyannis
- US 6 in West Barnstable
- North end: Route 6A in West Barnstable

Location
- Country: United States
- State: Massachusetts
- Counties: Barnstable

Highway system
- Massachusetts State Highway System; Interstate; US; State
← Route 131	→ Route 133

Route 132 is a 3.69-mile-long (5.94 km) state highway in the town of Barnstable, Massachusetts, part of Cape Cod. The entire length of the highway is also locally signed as part of Iyannough Road. Route 132 is the main link between greater Barnstable and the village of Hyannis, in fact, all of Route 132 lies within the Barnstable city limits, and connects Routes 28 and 6A via an almost straight northwest-southeast course.

== Route description ==
The southern terminus is at the Airport Rotary in Hyannis, at the intersection of Route 28. Iyanough Road itself begins further east on Route 28 at the Barnstable/Yarmouth border. The southernmost mile contains an immense number of malls and other large shopping centers along the route, such as the Christmas Tree Shops Plaza, Cape Cod Mall, the Capetown (K-Mart) Plaza, the Independence Plaza, and the Festival In Hyannis shopping center. Other restaurants, hotels, car dealerships, and strip malls dot the road densely until the intersection with Phinney's Lane. At Mile 3.0, it crosses underneath Route 6 at Exit 68. Cape Cod's only freeway service plaza is at this intersection. North of the intersection is Cape Cod Community College. The northern terminus of Route 132 is at Route 6A in the village of West Barnstable.

=== Traffic ===
Route 132 is notorious for its heavy traffic, especially during summer months. Originally 2 lanes on its entire length when first built, development has necessitated about half of the road's length to be widened to 4 lanes, with another stretch (between Phinney's Lane and US 6) constructed as a divided highway. Part of the original Route 132 was bypassed around Phinney's Lane in the 1960s to straighten out the road and keep traffic moving at a reasonable pace. Locally, the old section is simply known as "Old Route 132," and is officially designated as part of Attucks Lane by the town of Barnstable. The old road grade is on the right and it currently being used as a staging area for construction equipment.

== Major intersections ==
The entire route is in Barnstable County.

Location	mi	km	Destinations	Notes
Hyannis	0.00	0.00	Route 28 (Falmouth Road / Iyannough Road) – Falmouth, Chatham	Southern terminus; Barnstable Rotary
Hyannis	0.70	1.13	Independence Drive to US 6	Proposed
Hyannis	1.30	2.09	Bearse's Way – Hyannis West End	
Centerville	2.40	3.86	Shootflying Hill Road – Centerville Beach	
West Barnstable	3.00	4.83	US 6 (Mid-Cape Highway) – New Bedford, Orleans, Provincetown	Exit 68 on US 6; partial cloverleaf interchange
West Barnstable	3.69	5.94	Route 6A (Main Street) – Barnstable, Orleans, Provincetown, West Barnstable, Sandwich	Northern terminus
1.000 mi = 1.609 km; 1.000 km = 0.621 mi: Unopened
