= Eldredge Park =

Baseball venue in Orleans, Massachusetts

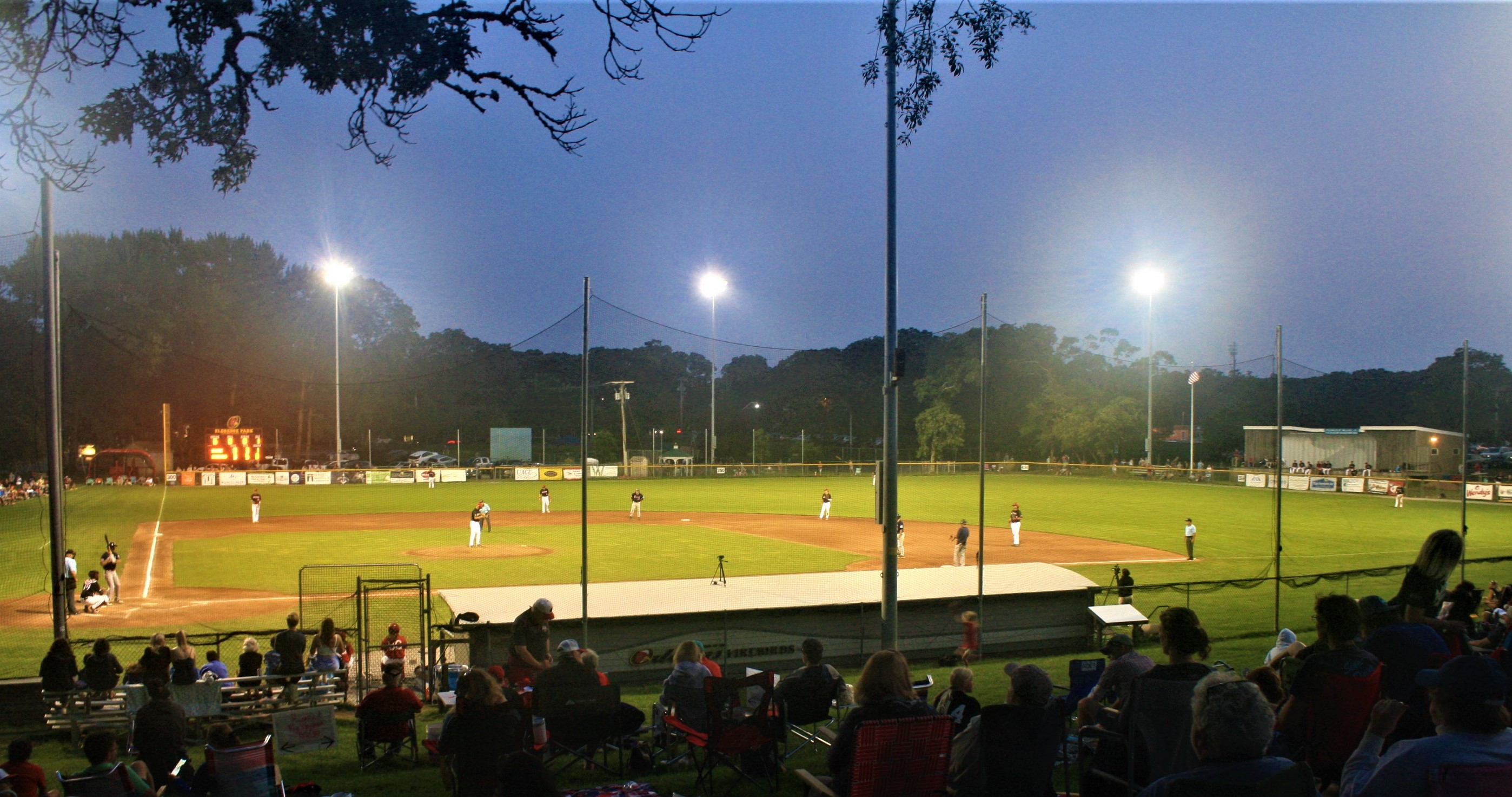
- Interactive map of Eldredge Park
- Address: 78 Eldredge Park Way
- Location: Orleans, Massachusetts
- Coordinates: 41.782775°N 69.990298°W
- Capacity: 6,000
- Surface: Grass
- Field size: Left Field: 300 ft Center Field: 434 ft Right Field: 314 ft

Construction
- Opened: 1913
- Renovated: 1966, 2011

Tenant
- Orleans Firebirds

Eldredge Park is a baseball venue in Orleans, Massachusetts, home to the Orleans Firebirds of the Cape Cod Baseball League (CCBL). The ballpark is located adjacent to Nauset Regional Middle School along Massachusetts Route 28. It features the deepest centerfield in the Cape League at 434 feet, a bandstand just beyond the right-centerfield fence, and a playground beyond the left-centerfield fence. Fans on blankets and beach chairs take in the action from the grassy terraced hillside that runs the entire length of the first base side of the field.

The oldest park in the Cape League, Eldredge Park opened in 1913, just one year after Fenway Park. The land for the park was donated to the town of Orleans by baseball enthusiast Louis Winslow "Win" Eldredge, “in consideration of [his] affection for and interest in the young people of Orleans and [his] desire to provide a playground for them.” The park quickly became a popular community gathering place. Thanks to the nearby transatlantic telegraph cable station, fans at Eldredge were among the first Americans to receive the news that Charles Lindbergh had touched down safely in Paris.

The original configuration of Eldredge Park located home plate in what is today its left-field corner. After generations of batters struggled to hit against the visual backdrop of a setting sun, the configuration was changed in the mid-1960s. The newly-reconfigured park opened for the 1967 CCBL all-star game, a game attended by Massachusetts Governor John Volpe, who lauded Eldredge as the finest community field in New England.

Additional improvements continued to be made to Eldredge, as when lights were added in 1979. The hillside was terraced in 1985 and 1986, and has become the preferred vantage point of the home fans. The press box, called the "Bird's Nest", originally constructed in 1981, was rebuilt in 2003. In 2010-2011 a grant from the Yawkey Foundation allowed for other major improvements such as a brick backstop, new dugouts and bullpens, fan-protective netting, and new infield turf. In 2019, artist Gwen Marcus' sculpture The Catch, which depicts a young ballplayer reaching to catch a baseball, was dedicated and installed on the hill behind home plate.

Eldredge Park has been described as "a Norman Rockwell painting come to life," and "a sylvan setting so transcendently beautiful one's breath is swept away." The park has been pictured in Sports Illustrated, and has been ranked by Baseball America as the top summer collegiate ballpark in the nation. A two-page photo spread of Eldredge Park by renowned photographer Joel Meyerowitz was featured in the photographic essay Baseball in America. The image is of a hazy evening at Eldredge Park with sun setting over the bandstand in the distance; in the foreground, fans in beach chairs take in the game from along the left-field foul line.

Eldredge Park hosted the CCBL's annual all-star game and home run derby festivities in 1988, 1989, 1990, 1994, 2004 and 2019, and has seen Orleans claim CCBL championships in 1986, 1993, 2003, and 2005. The ballpark has been the summertime home of dozens of future major leaguers such as Carlton Fisk, Frank Thomas, Mark Teixeira, Nomar Garciaparra, and Marcus Stroman.

== See also ==
- Cape Cod Baseball League
- Orleans Firebirds
