= Massachusetts Route 39 =

State highway in Barnstable County, Massachusetts, US

Route 39
- Route 39 highlighted in red

Route information
- Maintained by MassDOT
- Length: 8.15 mi (13.12 km)

Major junctions
- South end: Route 28 in Harwich
- Route 124 in Harwich; Route 137 in Harwich
- North end: Route 28 in Orleans

Location
- Country: United States
- State: Massachusetts
- Counties: Barnstable

Highway system
- Massachusetts State Highway System; Interstate; US; State
← Route 38	→ Route 40

Route 39 is a 8.15-mile-long (13.12 km) southwest-northeast route through the towns of Harwich, Brewster and Orleans, on Cape Cod, Massachusetts. It begins and ends at Route 28, acting as a bypass route for those not wishing to follow 28 through Harwich Port and Chatham.

== Route description ==
The route begins at Massachusetts 28 in the village of Harwich Port and for its first 1.4 miles (2.3 km), along Sisson Road and a portion of Main Street in Harwich Center, it is coextensive with Route 124. Route 124 then turns north along Pleasant Lake Ave, leaving the concurrency. Route 39 continues through the village of East Harwich intersecting Route 137 before entering Brewster. After a half-mile in Brewster, the road becomes the town line between Brewster and Orleans for another mile before officially leaving Brewster. Once it is wholly in Orleans, the road heads north for another 0.3 miles (0.48 km) before terminating at Route 28, approximately 3.5 miles (5.6 km) south of that road's terminus at the traffic circle on the Orleans-Eastham town line.

== Major intersections ==
The entire route is in Barnstable County.

Location	mi	km	Destinations	Notes
Harwich	0.0	0.0	Route 28 – West Harwich, Hyannis, Harwichport Route 124 begins	Southern terminus; southern terminus of Route 124
Harwich	1.4	2.3	Route 124 north to US 6 – Brewster	Northern end of Route 124 concurrency
Harwich	4.7	7.6	Route 137 – Chatham, Brewster	
Orleans	8.2	13.2	Route 28 – Orleans, Provincetown, Chatham	Northern terminus
1.000 mi = 1.609 km; 1.000 km = 0.621 mi: Concurrency terminus
