= Orleans (CDP), Massachusetts =

Orleans, Massachusetts
- Census-designated place
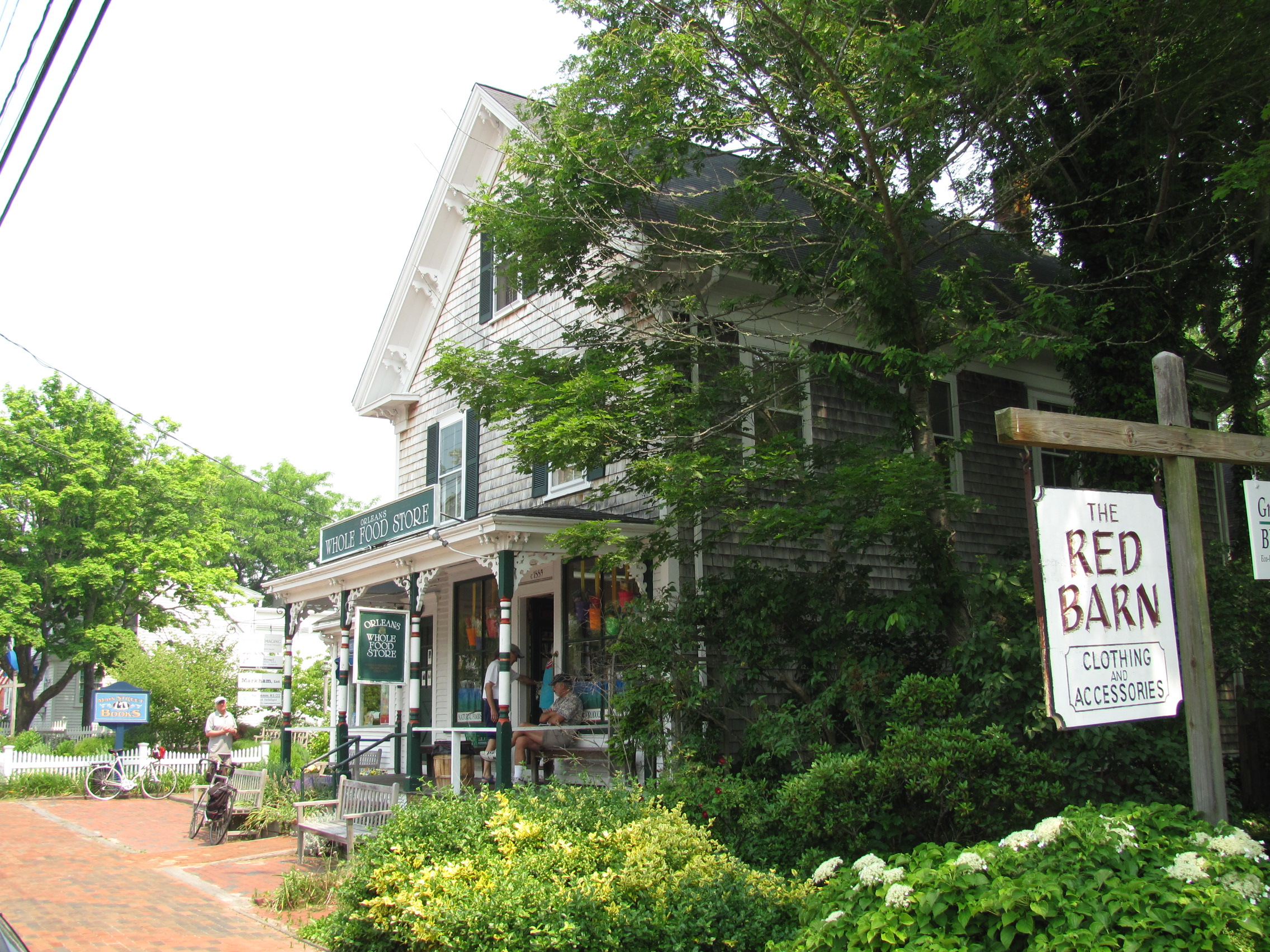
- Whole Food Store on Main Street

- Location in Barnstable County and the state of Massachusetts.
- Coordinates: 41°47′21″N 69°59′50″W
- Country: United States
- State: Massachusetts
- County: Barnstable
- Town: Orleans

Area
  - Total: 2.47 sq mi (6.41 km^{2})
  - Land: 2.32 sq mi (6.01 km^{2})
  - Water: 0.15 sq mi (0.40 km^{2})
- Elevation: 59 ft (18 m)

Population (2020)
  - Total: 1,767
  - Density: 761.8/sq mi (294.13/km^{2})
- Time zone: UTC-5 (Eastern (EST))
  - Summer (DST): UTC-4 (EDT)
- ZIP code: 02653
- Area code: 508
- FIPS code: 25-51405
- GNIS feature ID: 0616894

Orleans is a census-designated place (CDP) in the town of Orleans in Barnstable County, Massachusetts, United States. The population was 1,621 at the 2010 census.

== Geography ==
The Orleans CDP consists of the main settlement in the town of Orleans, located in the northern part of the town. It is bordered to the north by the town of Eastham, to the northwest by Cape Cod Bay, to the southwest by the town of Brewster, to the south by Massachusetts Route 6A and Eldredge Parkway, and to the east by Massachusetts Route 28 and Town Cove. Routes 28 and 6A converge at the center of the village. U.S. Route 6 passes through the CDP and meets the two other highways at the Orleans Rotary at the eastern edge of the CDP.

According to the United States Census Bureau, the CDP has a total area of 2.4 square miles (6.2 km^{2}), of which 2.3 square miles (5.9 km^{2}) is land, and 0.12 square miles (0.3 km^{2}) (4.51%) is water.

== Demographics ==
Historical population
Census	Pop.	Note	%±
2020	1,767		—
U.S. Decennial Census

As of the census of 2000, there were 1,716 people, 867 households, and 390 families residing in the CDP. The population density was 289.3 people/km^{2} (749 people/mi^{2}). There were 1,279 housing units at an average density of 215.6 units/km^{2} (558 units/mi^{2}). The racial makeup of the CDP was 97.09% White, 0.52% Black or African American, 0.17% Native American, 0.64% Asian, 0.35% from other races, and 1.22% from two or more races. Hispanic or Latino of any race were 1.92% of the population.

There were 867 households, out of which 12.6% had children under the age of 18 living with them, 35.3% were married couples living together, 7.6% had a female householder with no husband present, and 55.0% were non-families. 48.0% of all households were made up of individuals, and 28.4% had someone living alone who was 65 years of age or older. The average household size was 1.92 and the average family size was 2.59.

In the CDP, the population was spread out, with 13.6% under the age of 18, 4.3% from 18 to 24, 19.9% from 25 to 44, 27.1% from 45 to 64, and 35.1% who were 65 years of age or older. The median age was 54 years. For every 100 females, there were 80.3 males. For every 100 females age 18 and over, there were 76.8 males.

The median income for a household in the CDP was $30,238, and the median income for a family was $44,130. Males had a median income of $39,792 versus $25,921 for females. The per capita income for the CDP was $23,033. About 1.8% of families and 6.9% of the population were below the poverty line, including none of those under age 18 and 5.7% of those age 65 or over.
