= Sturgis Library =

Historic building in Massachusetts

Coordinates: 41.703270°N 70.307197°W

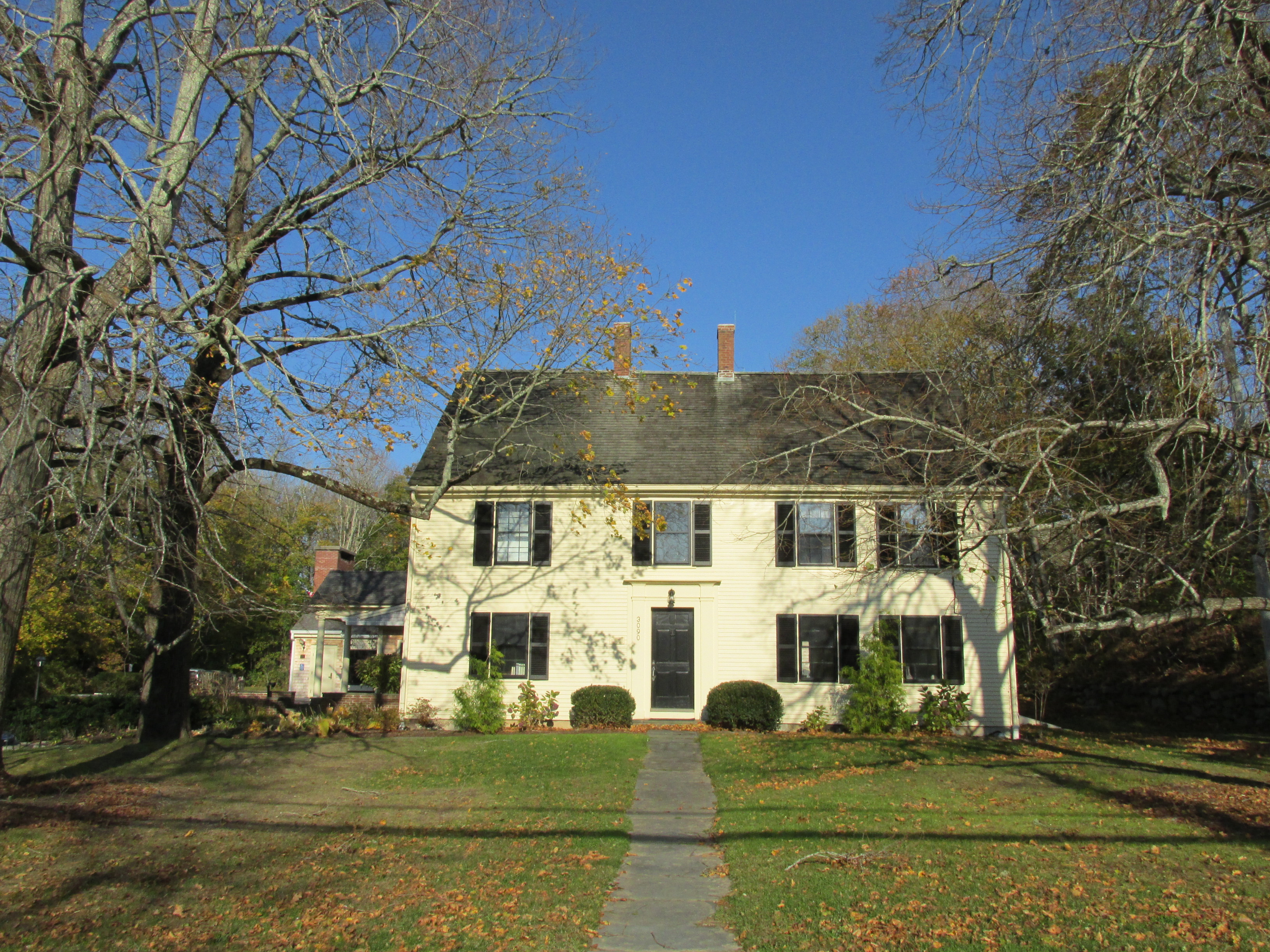
Lothrop House, now Sturgis Library's historic section.

Sturgis Library in Barnstable, Massachusetts is the oldest building that houses a public library in America.

The original library building was built in 1644 as the house of Rev. John Lothropp and is the oldest building housing a public library in the United States. Since Reverend Lothrop used the front room of the house for public worship, another distinction of the Sturgis Library is that it is the oldest structure still standing in the United States where religious services were regularly held. This room is now called "The Lothrop Room" and contains a beamed ceiling and pumpkin-colored wide-board floors that exemplify the quintessential early character of authentic Cape Cod houses. The library was organized in 1863 and has continuously operated since that date.
