= Barnstable (village), Massachusetts =

Village in Massachusetts, United States

Coordinates: 41°42′5.1″N 70°18′11.0″W

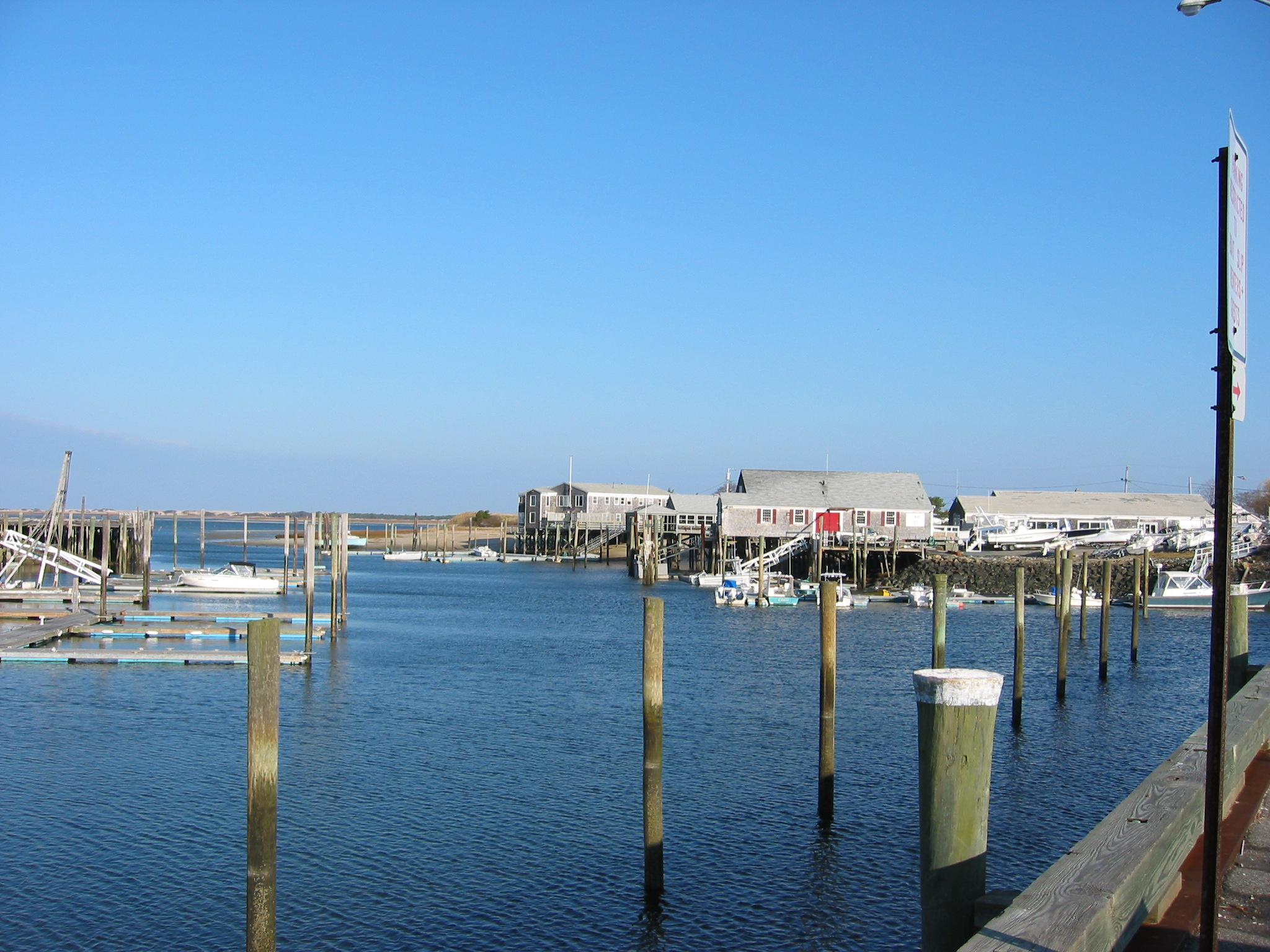
Barnstable Harbor, November 2002

Location of ZIP code 02630 Barnstable within the Town of Barnstable, county, and state

Barnstable is the name of one of the seven villages within the Town of Barnstable, Massachusetts, United States. The Village of Barnstable is located on the north side of the town, centered along "Old King's Highway" (Massachusetts Route 6A). It houses the County Complex of Barnstable County, a small business district, a working harbor, and several small beaches. The village is home to many small attractions, including Sturgis Library, the Olde Colonial Courthouse (now Tales of Cape Cod), the Barnstable Comedy Club, and the Trayser Museum.

== Attractions ==
=== Sturgis Library ===
The Sturgis Library was constructed in 1644 for the Reverend John Lothrop, founder of Barnstable. The building is one of the oldest houses remaining on Cape Cod. The house which forms the original part of the library is the oldest building housing a public library in the United States. Since Reverend Lothrop used the front room of the house for public worship, another distinction of the Sturgis Library is that it is the oldest structure still standing in America where religious services were regularly held. This room is now called "The Lothrop Room" and contains a beamed ceiling and pumpkin-colored wide-board floors that exemplify the quintessential early character of authentic Cape Cod houses.

=== Olde Colonial Courthouse ===
The Olde Colonial Courthouse is one of the oldest courthouses in the United States. Built of wood, court proceedings of the King's Court were interrupted in 1774 by James Otis, Samuel Adams and 1,500 other protestors opposed to the King's bill of attainder that denied the right of colonists to a jury trial. As a result, the King's judge decided to cease holding cases. It served as a state courthouse until 1838. This courthouse in now a museum and hosts the "Tales of Cape Cod", a local tourist attraction.

=== Barnstable Comedy Club ===
The Barnstable Comedy Club is the oldest and longest-running community theater in Massachusetts.

=== Trayser Museum ===
The Trayser Museum is the former county custom house, which now houses a Coast Guard Heritage Museum. Also on the grounds of the museum is a jail, complete with inmates' graffiti. The jail dates back to 1690.

=== Barnstable Village ===
Barnstable Village is also home to the Crocker Tavern, which was built around 1754 and is listed in the National Register of Historic Places. The Crocker Tavern served as a stagecoach stop, an inn, and an important meeting place into the mid-19th century. Cornelius Crocker, one of the wealthiest men on the Cape, was the first keeper of the tavern. Under the stewardship of Crocker, the inn became the central meeting place for American patriots including James Otis prior to, and during, the Revolutionary War.

== In popular culture ==
In his collection of short stories, Welcome to the Monkey House, author Kurt Vonnegut references Barnstable Village on more than one occasion. Vonnegut and his family lived in Barnstable, in a house overlooking Barnstable Harbor, from 1951 to 1971.

== See also ==
- Town of Barnstable
