= Massachusetts Route 6A =

Highway in Massachusetts

Route 6A
- Route 6A highlighted in red

Route information
- Maintained by MassDOT
- Length: 62.362 mi (100.362 km)
- Existed: c. 1950–present

Major junctions
- West end: US 6 in Bourne
- Route 132 in West Barnstable; Route 134 in Dennis; US 6 in Orleans; Route 28 in Orleans; US 6 from Eastham to Truro
- North end: US 6 in Provincetown

Location
- Country: United States
- State: Massachusetts

Highway system
- Massachusetts State Highway System; Interstate; US; State
← US 6	→ US 7

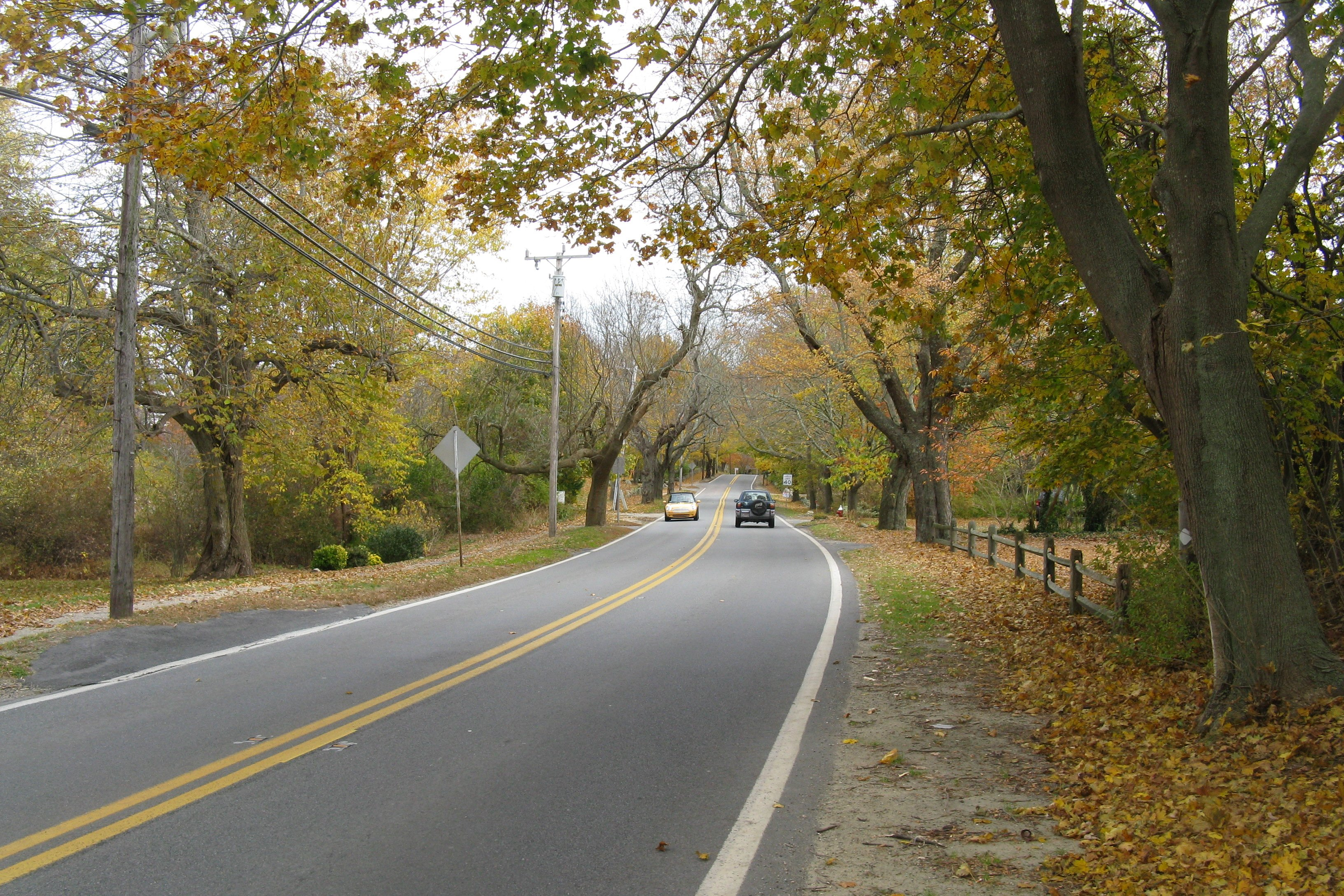
In Barnstable Village

Massachusetts Route 6A is the state road for two sections formerly known as U.S. Route 6 (US 6) on Cape Cod. Most of Route 6A is also known as the Old King's Highway. Combining the 2 major sections (and a "silent" concurrency with US 6 through Eastham, Wellfleet, and South Truro), the highway is approximately 62 miles (100 km) long.

== Route description ==
Although some maps have Route 6A starting at the Bourne Bridge Rotary along Sandwich Road, it actually starts some feet east of the Sagamore Bridge, according to state signage. From there, it goes thus:

- Bourne: Sandwich Road
- Sandwich: Route 6A
- Barnstable: Main Street
- Yarmouth: Main Street
- Dennis: Old King's Highway
- Brewster: Main Street
- Orleans: Cranberry Highway
- Truro: Shore Road
- Provincetown: Commercial Street (1 mile), Bradford Street (2.5 miles), Province Lands Road (1 mile)

Since 1982, Route 6A has ended at an intersection (signalized until 2010) with US 6 at Herring Cove, part of the Cape Cod National Seashore. Before 1982, the intersection was a large complicated rotary-like design, and Route 6A traveled slightly farther north than its intersection with US 6, ending at the exit off the rotary for the remainder of Province Lands Road toward Race Point.

It is signed east/west on both sections of the highway. Until 2015, the highway was signed north/south from Truro and Provincetown.

Some maps erroneously had the northern Route 6A having its southern terminus at US 6 along Mayflower Avenue in Provincetown. However, since Mayflower Avenue is an extremely narrow private road of questionable maintenance, and there is no access from east US 6 to Mayflower Avenue, the reason for this misunderstanding was unknown. This has since been fixed in most maps which once contained this error.

Some maps also erroneously mark US 6's old routing through downtown Wellfleet as Route 6A, though MassHighway (and the Massachusetts Department of Public Works before it) has never included the stretch as part of Route 6A.

Prior to 1964, a second Route 6A existed in Fall River and Westport. Around 1961, it began overlapped with Route 24 at US 6/Martine Street in Fall River and left Route 24 at the President Ave./Eastern Ave. rotary, then following President Avenue to end at Route 79, US 6, Route 103, and Route 138 on the Taunton River waterfront. By 1964, Route 6A was moved off Route 24 and used the full length of Eastern Avenue. This western Route 6A was decommissioned by 1965, and US 6 was moved onto its alignment.

== History ==
Route 6A was first signed upon partial completion of the Mid-Cape Highway, which was Cape Cod's first freeway in 1953, traveling between the Sagamore Bridge in Bourne and Route 132 in Barnstable. A second stretch in 1954 was signed when a US 6 bypass was constructed in Truro and Provincetown, although in Provincetown, Route 6A was signed along Bradford Street instead of US 6's former routing on Commercial Street, as the latter road had become one-way westbound. A third stretch in 1956 was signed between Route 132 in Barnstable and the Orleans–Eastham town line when the US 6 freeway was completed.

Route 6A does not officially exist in Eastham or Wellfleet as the road is in an unsigned concurrency with US 6.

The road is generally considered to be Cape Cod's most historic and scenic highway. The Barnstable portion has been listed on the National Register of Historic Places as the Old King's Highway Historic District.

The only portions of the Provincetown section under state (or federal) maintenance are the Commercial Street section (including Bradford between Commercial and Allerton) and the Province Lands Road section (which runs through National Park land). The remainder of the Bradford Street section has always been locally maintained, and though that section carries the occasional mile marker from the last postings in 1979, it has always only sparsely been signed as Route 6A.

There was once another section of Route 6A running through downtown Truro along Truro Center Road, although it was never signed or mile-marked. When Truro Center Road and North Truro's Shore Road were turned back to local maintenance in 1979, the Route 6A designation was officially removed from the downtown Truro section, though locals still referred to it as "Route 6A" until it was officially named "Truro Center Road."

The section of Route 6A from North Truro to its terminus in the Cape Cod National Seashore was signed as a north–south route until 2015 when MassDOT completed replacement of those signs with east–west signage.

From around 1955 to around 1962, a second Route 6A existed in Fall River and Westport. Around 1961, it began overlapped with Route 24 at US 6/Martine Street in Fall River and left Route 24 at (its interchange with) the President Ave./Eastern Ave. rotary, then following President Avenue to end at Route 79, US 6, Route 103, and Route 138 on the Taunton River waterfront. By 1964, Route 6A was moved off Route 24 and used the full length of Eastern Avenue. This western Route 6A was decommissioned by 1965; US 6 was moved onto its alignment, as part of US 6's previous alignment was reconstructed to make room for Interstate 195 to run through the city.

== Major intersections ==
The entire route is in Barnstable County.

Location	mi	km	Destinations	Notes
Bourne	0.000	0.000	US 6 east – Hyannis, Provincetown	Western terminus; access via Mid-Cape Connector; exit 55 on US 6
Bourne	0.803	1.292	To US 6 west (Sagamore Bridge) / Route 3 north – New Bedford, Providence, RI, Boston	Access via Cranberry Highway
Sandwich	1.254	2.018	Route 130 south – Sandwich, Mashpee	Northern terminus of Route 130
West Barnstable	10.419	16.768	Route 149 south to US 6 – Marstons Mills, Osterville	Northern terminus of Route 149
West Barnstable	12.232	19.685	Route 132 south to US 6 – Hyannis, Chatham	Northern terminus of Route 132
East Dennis	24.122	38.821	Route 134 south to US 6 – South Dennis	Northern terminus of Route 134
Brewster	28.190	45.367	Route 137 south – East Harwich, Chatham	Northern terminus of Route 137
Brewster	28.253	45.469	Route 124 south – Harwich Center, Harwichport	Northern terminus of Route 124
Orleans	32.978– 33.187	53.073– 53.409	US 6 – Hyannis, New Bedford, Eastham, Provincetown	Exit 89 on US 6
Orleans	34.399	55.360	Route 28 north – Chatham, Falmouth	Southern terminus of Route 28
Eastham	34.968	56.276	US 6 west – Hyannis, New Bedford, Eastham, Provincetown	Orleans Rotary; western end of unsigned US 6 concurrency
Truro	53.606	86.270	US 6 east – Provincetown	Eastern end of unsigned US 6 concurrency
Provincetown	62.382	100.394	US 6 west – New Bedford, Race Point	Eastern terminus
1.000 mi = 1.609 km; 1.000 km = 0.621 mi: Concurrency terminus
