= Orleans, Massachusetts =

Town in Massachusetts, United States

- Town
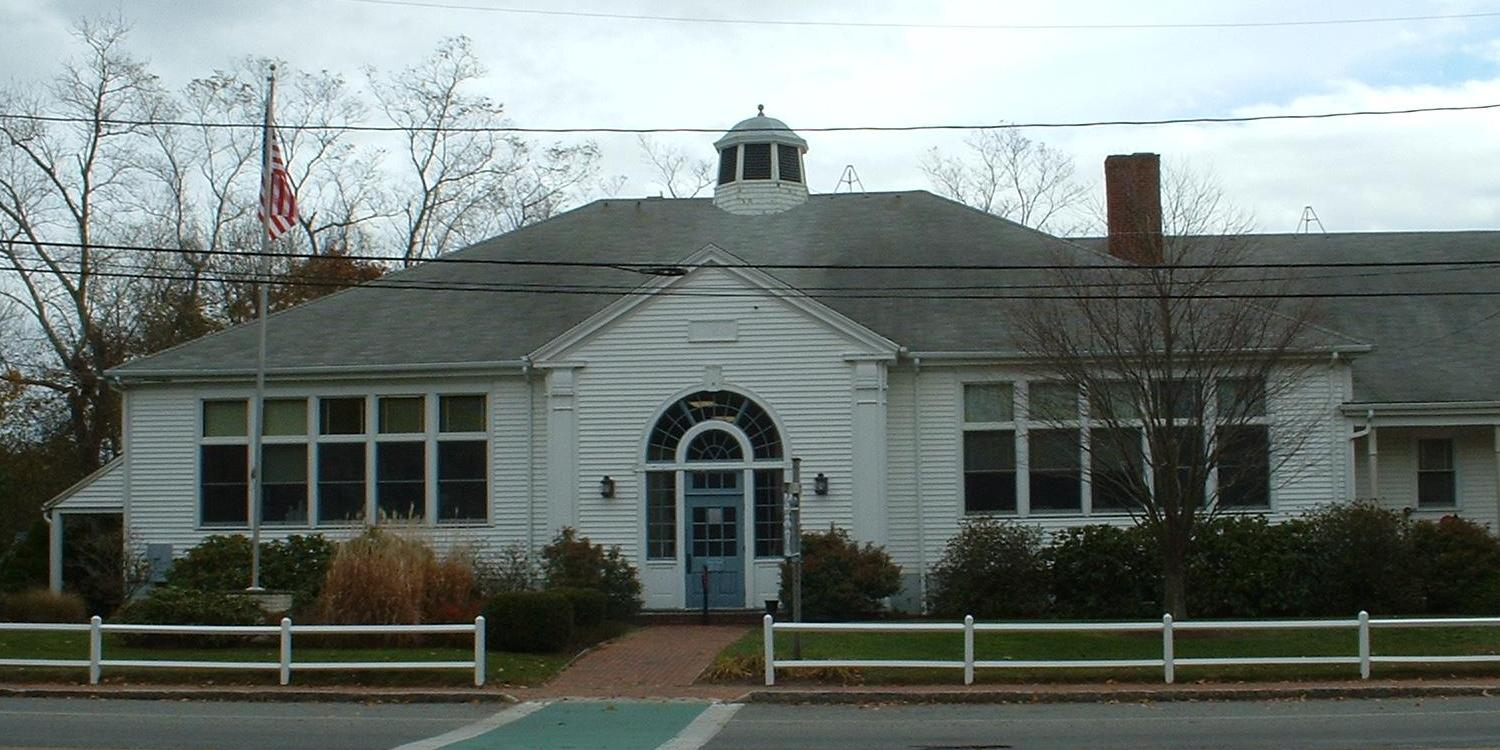
- Orleans Town Hall

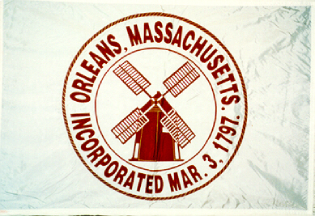
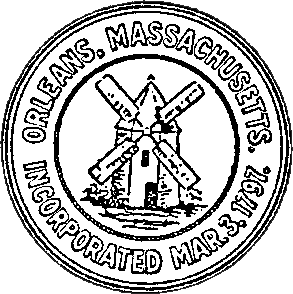
- Flag Seal

- Location in Barnstable County and the state of Massachusetts.
- Coordinates: 41°47′23″N 69°59′25″W
- Country: United States
- State: Massachusetts
- County: Barnstable
- Settled: 1693
- Incorporated: 1797

Government
  - Type: Open town meeting
  - Town Administrator: Kimberly Newman

Area
  - Total: 22.7 sq mi (58.7 km^{2})
  - Land: 14.1 sq mi (36.6 km^{2})
  - Water: 8.5 sq mi (22.0 km^{2})
- Elevation: 59 ft (18 m)

Population (2020)
  - Total: 6,307
  - Density: 446/sq mi (172.3/km^{2})
- Time zone: UTC−5 (Eastern)
  - Summer (DST): UTC−4 (Eastern)
- ZIP Codes: 02643 (East Orleans); 02653 (Orleans); 02662 (South Orleans)
- Area code: 508
- FIPS code: 25-51440
- GNIS feature ID: 0618257
- Website: www.town.orleans.ma.us

Orleans (/ɔːrˈliːnz/ or-LEENZ) is a town on Cape Cod in Massachusetts. The population was 6,307 at the 2020 census.

== History ==
Orleans was settled in 1693 by Pilgrims from the Plymouth Colony who were dissatisfied with the poor soil and small tracts of land granted to them. The town was officially separated from Eastham and incorporated in 1797. It was named in honor of Louis Philippe II, Duke of Orléans in recognition of France's support for the Thirteen Colonies during the American Revolution and because the town did not want an English name, as they had been captured twice by the British during the war.

The town's early history revolved around fishing, whaling, and agriculture. As the fishing industry grew, salt works sprang up to help preserve the catches. However, the town's growth depleted it of lumber, a situation that did not begin to be remedied until the railroad came and brought lumber from the mainland in the 19th century. The railroad also brought tourism to the town. In 1898, the French Cable Company built a 3,200-mile-long (5,100 km) transatlantic telegraph cable to Orleans, which operated from the French Cable Station.

The town's tourism industry was helped in 1961 with the creation of the Cape Cod National Seashore by President John F. Kennedy.

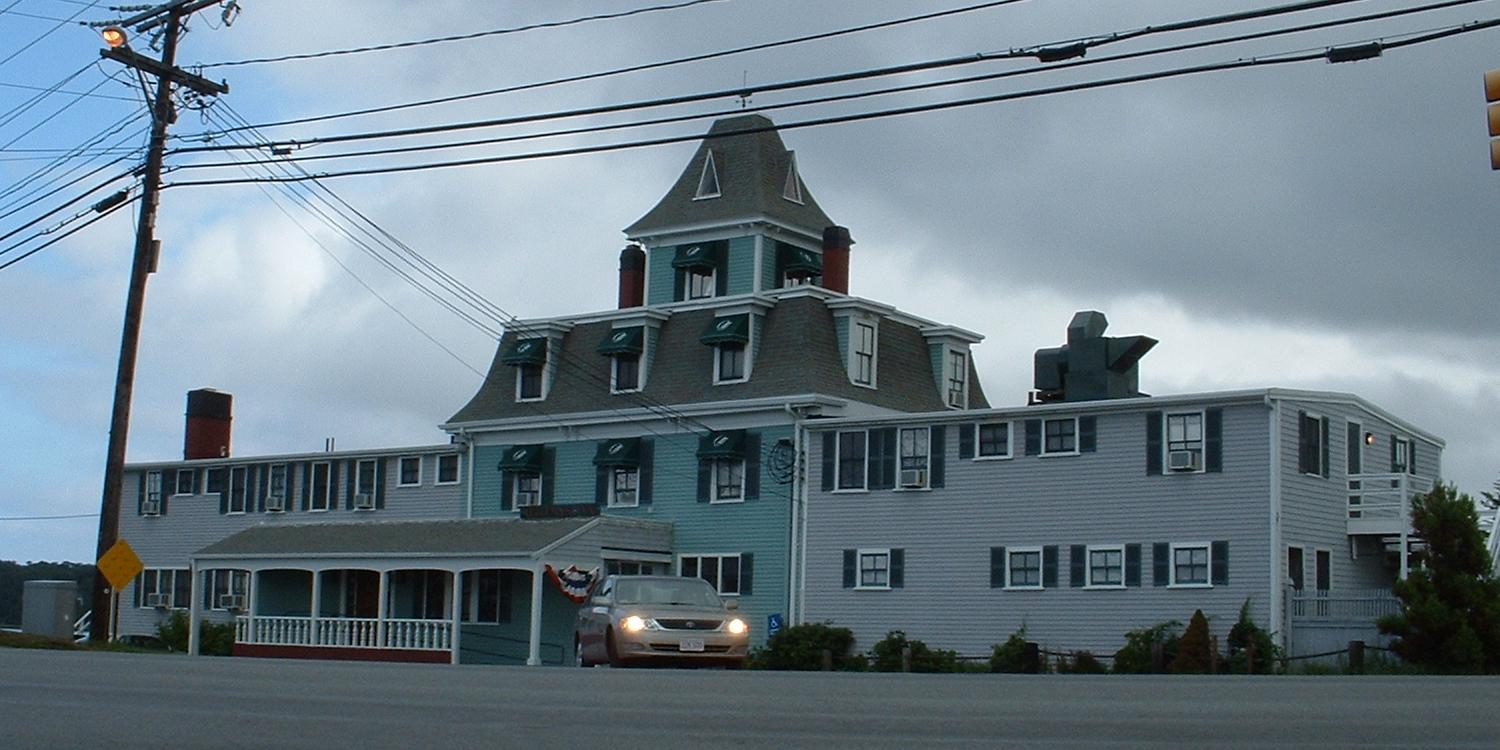
The Orleans Inn, between Town Cove and Route 28

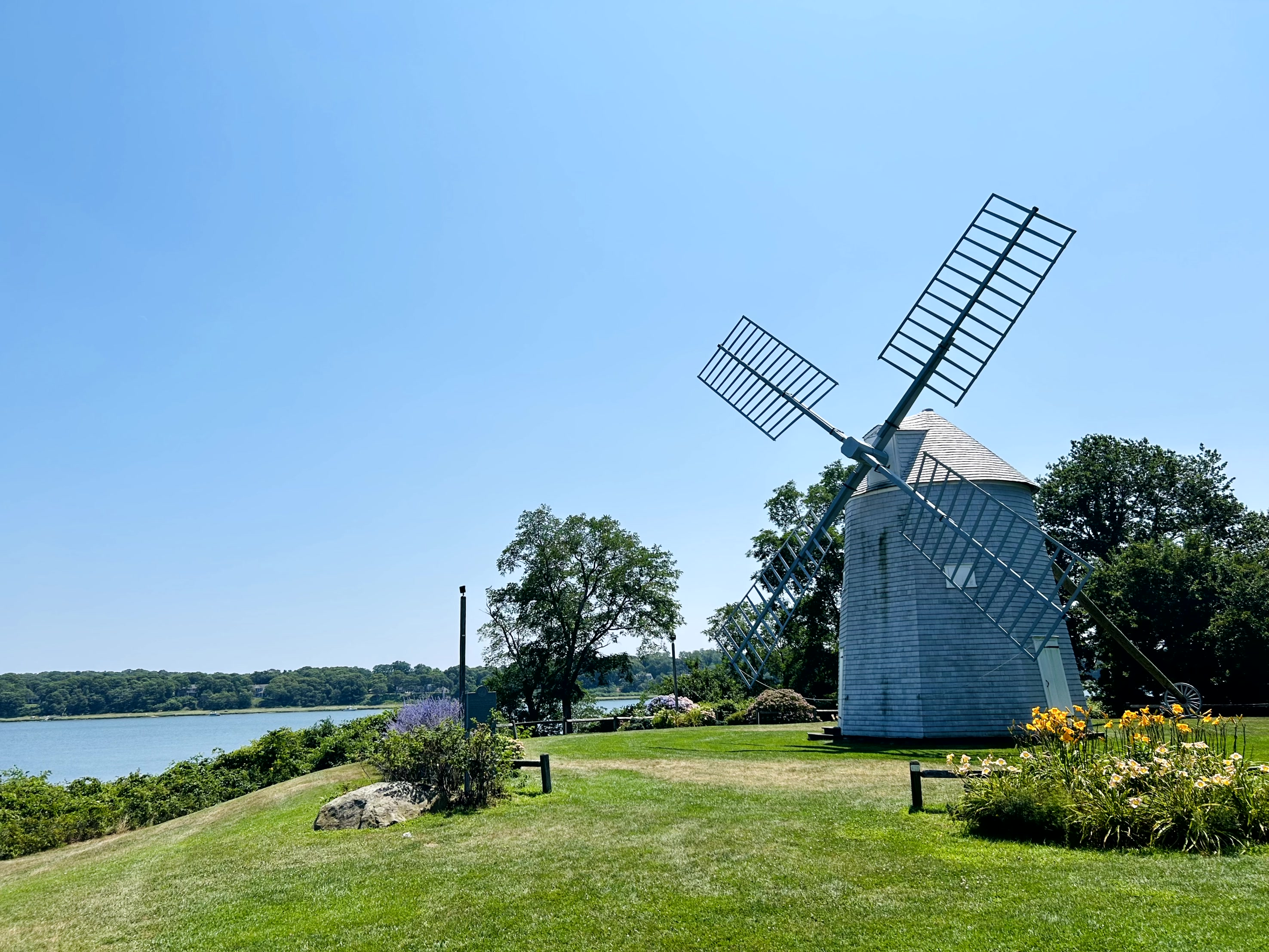
The Jonathan Young Windmill in Orleans, Massachusetts.

=== Attacks in wartime ===
Orleans is on an exposed portion of the coast and has been a target in wartime. In 1814, its residents repelled an invasion of British marines from HMS Newcastle during the War of 1812. Orleans was shelled by a German submarine in July 1918, during World War I. Nauset Beach was the only United States site hit by foreign munitions during that war; the shells were apparently aimed at barges close off shore. This was the first time that a foreign nation had fired artillery on United States soil since the Siege of Fort Texas in 1848.

== Geography ==
According to the United States Census Bureau, the town has a total area of 22.7 square miles (58.7 km^{2}), of which 14.1 square miles (36.6 km^{2}) is land and 8.5 square miles (22.0 km^{2}), or 37.59%, is water. Orleans is bordered by Eastham to the north, the Atlantic Ocean to the east, Pleasant Bay and the town of Chatham to the south, Harwich to the southwest, Brewster to the west, and Cape Cod Bay to the northwest.

Orleans is 27 miles (43 km) south of Provincetown, 22 miles (35 km) east of Barnstable, 36 miles (58 km) east of the Sagamore Bridge, and 90 miles (140 km) southeast of Boston. Orleans is located on the inner "elbow" section of Cape Cod. Bogs and ponds dot the western part of town, while there are many inlets, islands and harbors along the eastern coast of the town, including Town Cove, Nauset Harbor, Pleasant Bay, and Little Pleasant Bay. Rock Harbor, bounded by and shared with the town of Eastham, is located in the "crease" of the inner elbow and provides boating access to Cape Cod Bay. Cape Cod National Seashore lies along the coast as well.

=== Climate ===
The town of Orleans has a mild summer Humid continental climate (Dfb). The plant hardiness zone is 7a, with an average annual extreme minimum air temperature of 4.0 °F (−15.6 °C). The average seasonal (Nov.–Apr.) snowfall total is around 30 in (76 cm). The average snowiest month is February, which corresponds to the annual peak in nor'easter activity.

Climate data for Orleans, Barnstable County, Massachusetts (1991–2020 averages).
| Month | Jan | Feb | Mar | Apr | May | Jun | Jul | Aug | Sep | Oct | Nov | Dec | Year |
|---|---|---|---|---|---|---|---|---|---|---|---|---|---|
| Mean daily maximum °F (°C) | 38.5 (3.6) | 39.0 (3.9) | 43.5 (6.4) | 52.2 (11.2) | 61.3 (16.3) | 70.6 (21.4) | 77.5 (25.3) | 77.0 (25.0) | 71.0 (21.7) | 61.2 (16.2) | 52.1 (11.2) | 44.2 (6.8) | 57.3 (14.1) |
| Daily mean °F (°C) | 32.1 (0.1) | 32.7 (0.4) | 37.5 (3.1) | 46.0 (7.8) | 54.8 (12.7) | 64.1 (17.8) | 71.0 (21.7) | 70.4 (21.3) | 64.9 (18.3) | 55.1 (12.8) | 46.0 (7.8) | 38.0 (3.3) | 51.0 (10.6) |
| Mean daily minimum °F (°C) | 25.7 (−3.5) | 26.4 (−3.1) | 31.5 (−0.3) | 39.7 (4.3) | 48.4 (9.1) | 57.4 (14.1) | 64.4 (18.0) | 63.9 (17.7) | 58.7 (14.8) | 49.0 (9.4) | 40.0 (4.4) | 31.8 (−0.1) | 44.7 (7.1) |
| Average precipitation inches (mm) | 4.00 (102) | 3.65 (93) | 4.45 (113) | 4.09 (104) | 3.33 (85) | 3.33 (85) | 2.64 (67) | 3.48 (88) | 3.87 (98) | 4.47 (114) | 4.15 (105) | 4.70 (119) | 46.14 (1,172) |
| Average relative humidity (%) | 72.2 | 70.9 | 68.6 | 70.9 | 73.5 | 77.4 | 79.9 | 79.6 | 78.5 | 76.0 | 72.3 | 71.1 | 74.3 |
Source: PRISM Climate Group

Dew point data
| Month | Jan | Feb | Mar | Apr | May | Jun | Jul | Aug | Sep | Oct | Nov | Dec | Year |
|---|---|---|---|---|---|---|---|---|---|---|---|---|---|
| Average Dew Point °F | 23.4 | 24.1 | 28.1 | 36.7 | 46.1 | 56.3 | 63.5 | 63.2 | 56.9 | 46.5 | 37.6 | 28.5 | 42.7 |
| Average Dew Point °C | −4.8 | −4.4 | −2.2 | 2.6 | 7.8 | 13.5 | 17.5 | 17.3 | 13.8 | 8.1 | 3.1 | −1.9 | 5.9 |
Source: PRISM Climate Group

== Demographics ==
Historical population
| Year | Pop. | ±% |
|---|---|---|
| 1850 | 1,848 | — |
| 1860 | 1,678 | −9.2% |
| 1870 | 1,323 | −21.2% |
| 1880 | 1,294 | −2.2% |
| 1890 | 1,219 | −5.8% |
| 1900 | 1,123 | −7.9% |
| 1910 | 1,077 | −4.1% |
| 1920 | 1,012 | −6.0% |
| 1930 | 1,181 | +16.7% |
| 1940 | 1,451 | +22.9% |
| 1950 | 1,759 | +21.2% |
| 1960 | 2,342 | +33.1% |
| 1970 | 3,055 | +30.4% |
| 1980 | 5,306 | +73.7% |
| 1990 | 5,838 | +10.0% |
| 2000 | 6,341 | +8.6% |
| 2010 | 5,890 | −7.1% |
| 2020 | 6,307 | +7.1% |
| 2024* | 6,485 | +2.8% |
*=population estimates only Source: United States census records and Population Estimates Program data.

As of the census of 2000, there were 6,341 people, 3,087 households, and 1,771 families residing in the town. The population density was 447.3 inhabitants per square mile (172.7/km^{2}). There were 5,073 housing units at an average density of 357.9 per square mile (138.2/km^{2}). The racial makeup of the town was 97.57% White, 0.58% Black or African American, 0.17% Native American, 0.54% Asian, 0.14% from other races, and 0.99% from two or more races. Hispanic or Latino of any race were 0.77% of the population.

There were 3,087 households, out of which 14.8% had children under the age of 18 living with them, 49.4% were married couples living together, 6.0% had a female householder with no husband present, and 42.6% were non-families. Of all households, 37.2% were made up of individuals, and 21.9% had someone living alone who was 65 years of age or older. The average household size was 2.00 and the average family size was 2.55.

In the town, the population was spread out, with 13.8% under the age of 18, 3.5% from 18 to 24, 17.3% from 25 to 44, 29.4% from 45 to 64, and 36.0% who were 65 years of age or older. The median age was 56 years. For every 100 females, there were 87.4 males. For every 100 females age 18 and over, there were 84.2 males.

The median income for a household in the town was $42,594, and the median income for a family was $62,909. Males had a median income of $44,246 versus $30,017 for females. The per capita income for the town was $29,553. About 2.7% of families and 6.5% of the population were below the poverty line, including 5.6% of those under age 18 and 5.6% of those age 65 or over.

== Government ==
Orleans is represented in the Massachusetts House of Representatives as a part of the Fourth Barnstable district, which includes (with the exception of Brewster) all the towns east and north of Harwich on the Cape. The town is represented in the Massachusetts Senate as a part of the Cape and Islands District, which includes all of Cape Cod, Martha's Vineyard and Nantucket except the towns of Bourne, Falmouth, Sandwich and Mashpee. The town is patrolled by the Second (Yarmouth) Barracks of Troop D of the Massachusetts State Police.

On the national level, Orleans is a part of Massachusetts's 9th congressional district, and is currently represented by William R. Keating. The state's senior (Class I) member of the United States Senate, elected in 2012, is Elizabeth Warren. The junior (Class II) member, elected in 2013, is Ed Markey.

Orleans is governed by the open town meeting form of government, and is led by a town manager and a board of selectmen. The town has its own police and fire departments, both headquartered south of the Route 6A – Route 28 intersection. There are three post offices, in East Orleans, Orleans Center and South Orleans. The Snow Library, named for the original benefactor of the library, is located in Orleans Center, and is supported by the Cape Libraries Automated Materials Sharing (CLAMS) library network. The town also operates several beaches, boat landings, and small parks, and has a historical society and museum called the Centers for Culture and History in Orleans which meets in the town's original meeting house (across the street from the current Town Hall). Orleans is the site of a county courthouse, which serves much of the lower Cape.

== Education ==
Orleans, along with Brewster, Eastham and Wellfleet, belongs to the Nauset Regional School District. Each town provides schooling for their own elementary students, and collectively send their middle and high school students to regional schools. Orleans operates the Orleans Elementary School for students from kindergarten through fifth grade. The town is home to Nauset Regional Middle School, which serves students from sixth through eighth grade for the district. High school students attend Nauset Regional High School in North Eastham, but also have the option of attending Cape Cod Regional Technical High School in Harwich free of charge.

== Sports and recreation ==
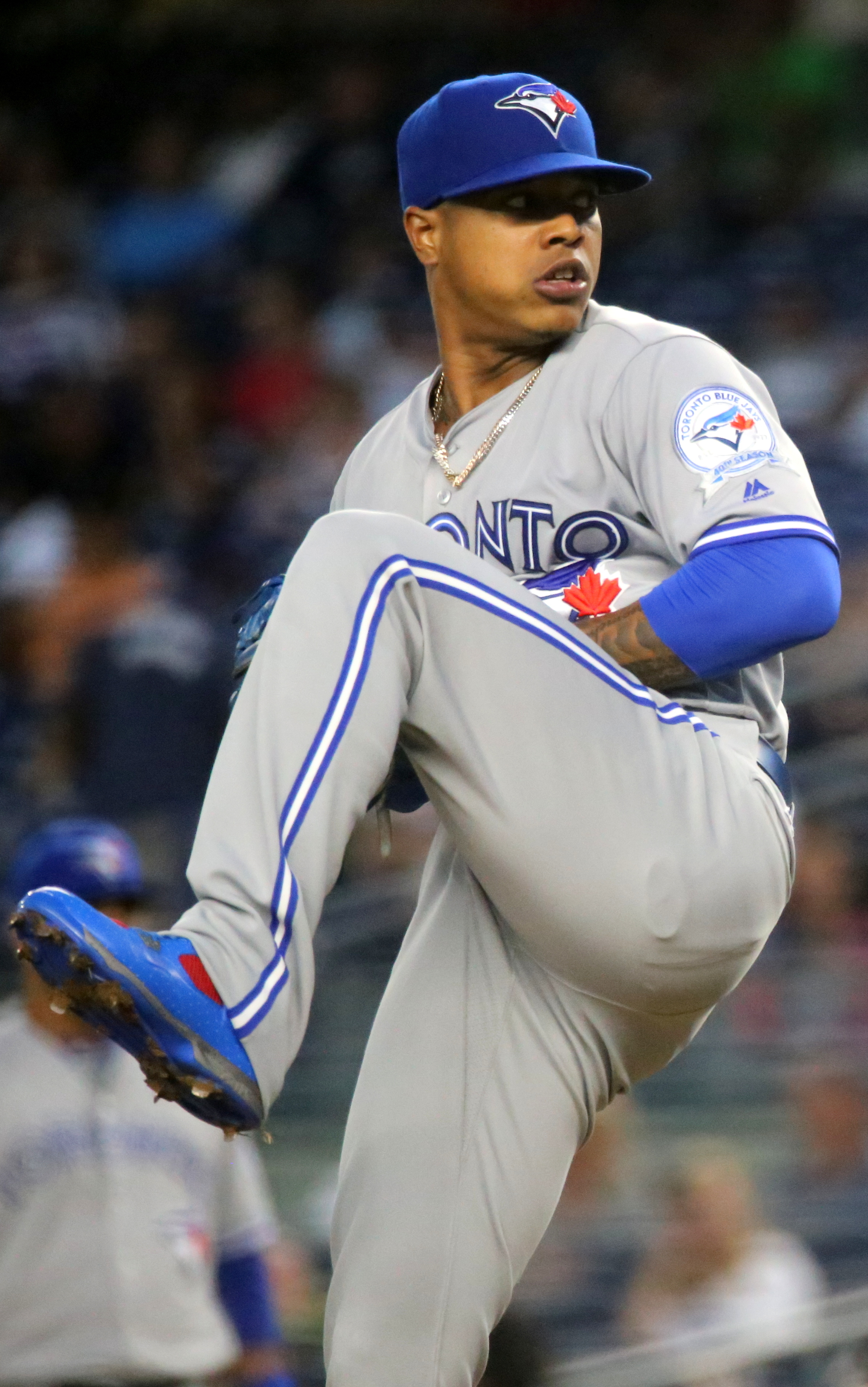
Marcus Stroman played for the Orleans Firebirds in 2010 and 2011.

Orleans is home to the Orleans Firebirds, an amateur collegiate summer baseball team in the Cape Cod Baseball League. The team plays at Eldredge Park, and has featured dozens of players who went on to careers in Major League Baseball, such as Frank Thomas, Nomar Garciaparra, and Marcus Stroman.

== Transportation ==
The town line between Eastham and Orleans is the site of the termini of Massachusetts Routes 6A and 28. The two routes join in the Orleans town center and end at a rotary with Route 6 at the Eastham town line. Massachusetts Route 39, which traces a portion of the Brewster town line, ends in the southern part of Orleans at Route 28. Other than two small non-outleted lanes, only Route 6 and Bridge Road pass northward into Eastham. Orleans has no rail or air service in town. Regional air service can be reached in nearby Hyannis, and the nearest national and international airport is Logan International Airport in Boston. The Cape Cod Regional Transit Authority operates buses on The Cape including one line with multiple stops in Orleans, connecting Orleans to Hyannis.

== Notable people ==
- Christian Garner (born 2000), soccer player

== See also ==
- Nauset Beach
