= Hokum Rock =

Boulder in Massachusetts, United States

- Location within Massachusetts Location within the United States

Highest point
- Elevation: 98 ft (30 m)
- Coordinates: 41°43′55″N 70°10′33″W

Geography
- Location: Cape Cod, Massachusetts
- Topo map: USGS Dennis

Hokum Rock is a glacial erratic boulder left by the last retreating ice age glacier, the Laurentide ice sheet, 20,000 to 12,000 years ago, when Cape Cod was formed. Hokum Rock is the second largest erratic boulder on the Cape. The largest is Doane Rock at Cape Cod National Seashore in Eastham. Hokum Rock is in Dennis, Barnstable County, Massachusetts. It is on the southeast shore of Scargo Lake 1 mile (1.6 km) east-southeast of Dennis. Black Ball Hill is located west and Scargo Hill is located northwest of Hokum Rock.
