= Massachusetts Route 134 =

State highway in Barnstable County, Massachusetts, US

Route 134
- Route 134 highlighted in red

Route information
- Maintained by MassDOT
- Length: 5.310 mi (8.546 km)
- Existed: 1930–present

Major junctions
- South end: Route 28 in West Dennis
- US 6 in South Dennis
- North end: Route 6A in East Dennis

Location
- Country: United States
- State: Massachusetts
- Counties: Barnstable

Highway system
- Massachusetts State Highway System; Interstate; US; State
← Route 133	→ Route 135

Massachusetts Route 134 is a 5.31-mile-long (8.55 km) north–south state highway entirely within the town of Dennis on Cape Cod in the U.S. state of Massachusetts. About 5.3 miles (8.5 km) long, Route 134 begins at an intersection with Route 28 in West Dennis. The route crosses north through Dennis, crossing US 6 at a cloverleaf interchange mid-way through. Route 134 ends at a junction with Route 6A in East Dennis, not far from Cape Cod Bay.

Route 134 was formerly a segment of Route 24, added about 1951.

== Route description ==
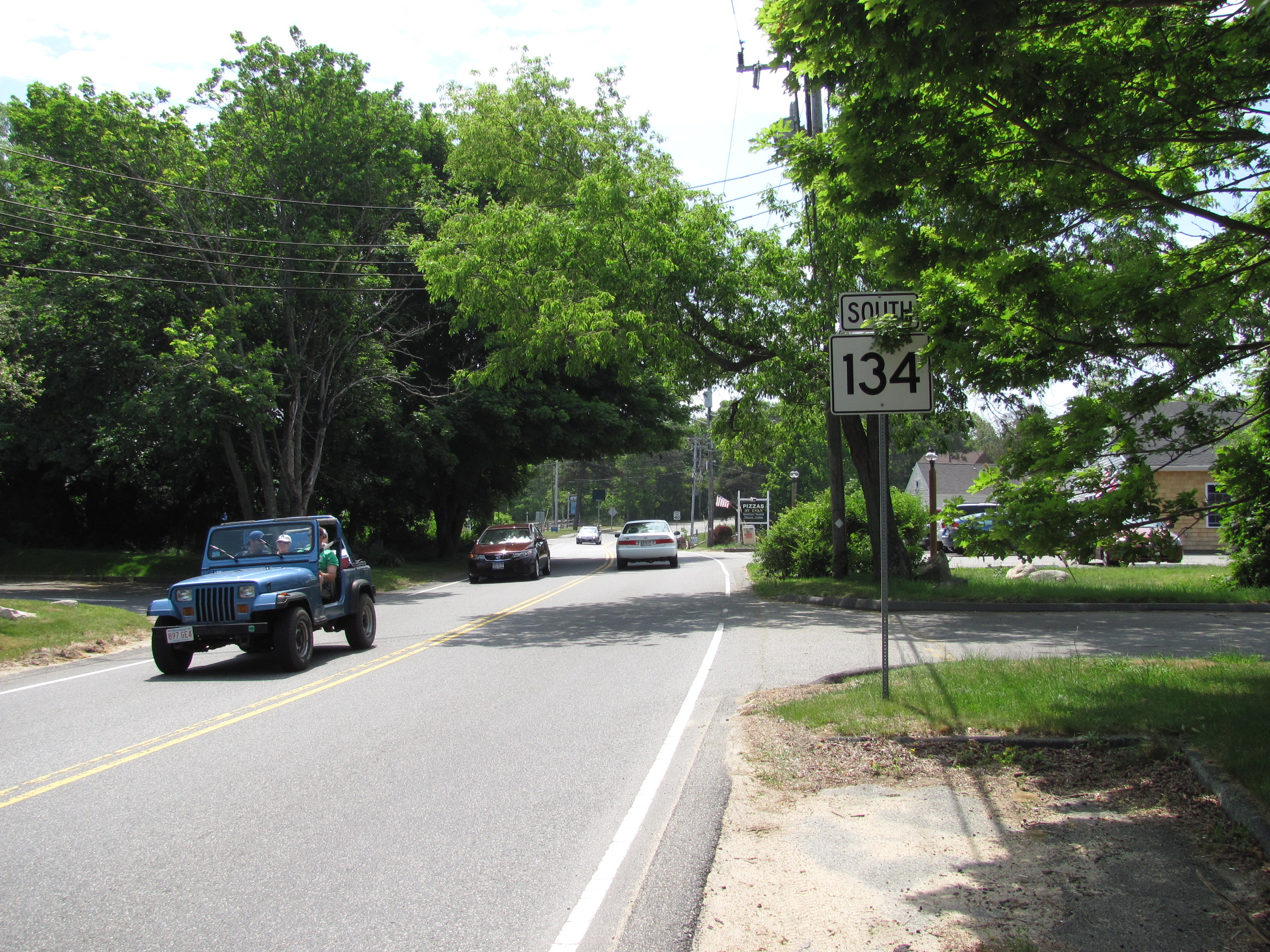
Route 134 southbound from the junction with Route 6A in East Dennis

Route 134 begins at an intersection with Route 28 (Main Street) in the Barnstable County town of Dennis. Located in the South Dennis neighborhood on Cape Cod, Route 134 proceeds north through South Dennis, the highway passes through a commercial center, serving as the main north–south highway. After the junction with Center Street, the route passes east of Fresh Pond, crosses Upper County Road, entering downtown South Dennis. A short distance north, Route 134 leaves South Dennis for the town of Dennis, becoming a four-lane highway and crossing a former railroad right-of-way that is now the Cape Cod Rail Trail. A bridge carries bike trail traffic over Route 134.

After the Cape Cod Rail Trail, the area around Route 134 is populated by strip malls, condominiums and industrial buildings. The route then enters a cloverleaf interchange (exits 78A-B) with US 6 (Mid-Cape Highway). After US 6, Route 134 continues north through Dennis, consolidated to a two-lane road through local areas of Dennis. Passing recreational facilities in Dennis, the route crosses Setucket Road before turning northward again. Route 134 passes west of Dennis Pines Golf Course and its access road. After a minor curve to the northwest, Route 134 reaches its northern terminus at a junction with Route 6A (Main Street). The road continues north as Bridge Street in the East Dennis section of Dennis, heading to the Cape Cod Bay.

== History ==
This highway has maintained the same route since at least 1930. Once named Route 24, it was renamed sometime in the past to its current name before 1951, when the current Route 24 was opened. A one mile (1.6 km) section south of Route 6 was widened to four lanes in the 1980s due to heavy commercial development.

Around 2001, the original half-clover interchange with US Route 6 was upgraded to a full cloverleaf interchange. This was done because of an extremely high accident rate at the existing ramps. As a result of this, the original exit numbering of Exit 9 on route 6 was changed to Exits 9A-B, Exit 9A for Route 134 South and Exit 9B for Route 134 North.

== Major intersections ==
The entire route is in Barnstable County.

Location	mi	km	Destinations	Notes
West Dennis	0.000	0.000	Route 28 – South Yarmouth, Hyannis	Southern terminus
South Dennis	2.004– 2.224	3.225– 3.579	US 6 (Mid-Cape Highway) – Orleans, Provincetown, Hyannis, Boston	Cloverleaf interchange; exits 78A-B on US 6
East Dennis	5.310	8.546	Route 6A – Barnstable, Boston, Brewster	Northern terminus
1.000 mi = 1.609 km; 1.000 km = 0.621 mi
