= Lighthouse Inn =

Lighthouse Inn may refer to:

- Lighthouse Inn (New London, Connecticut), listed on the NRHP in New London County, Connecticut
- Lighthouse Inn (West Dennis, Massachusetts), also known as West Dennis Lighthouse
