= John Sears =

John Sears may refer to:

- John Sears (salt producer) (1744–1817), founder of salt industry in Cape Cod, Massachusetts
- John Sears (political strategist) (1940–2020), American attorney and Republican political strategist
- John Sears (racing driver) (1936–1999), NASCAR Grand National driver
- John Sears (British politician), British member of parliament for Cheltenham, 1906–1910
- John George Sears (1870–1916), founder of Sears plc
- John W. Sears (1930–2014), chairman of the Massachusetts Republican party and longtime activist
- John Howell Sears (1823–1907), pioneer of the cities of Searsville and La Honda, California
- Mule (nomad) (born 1947/48), American nomad whose real name is John Sears
