= Follins Pond =

Lake in Massachusetts, United States

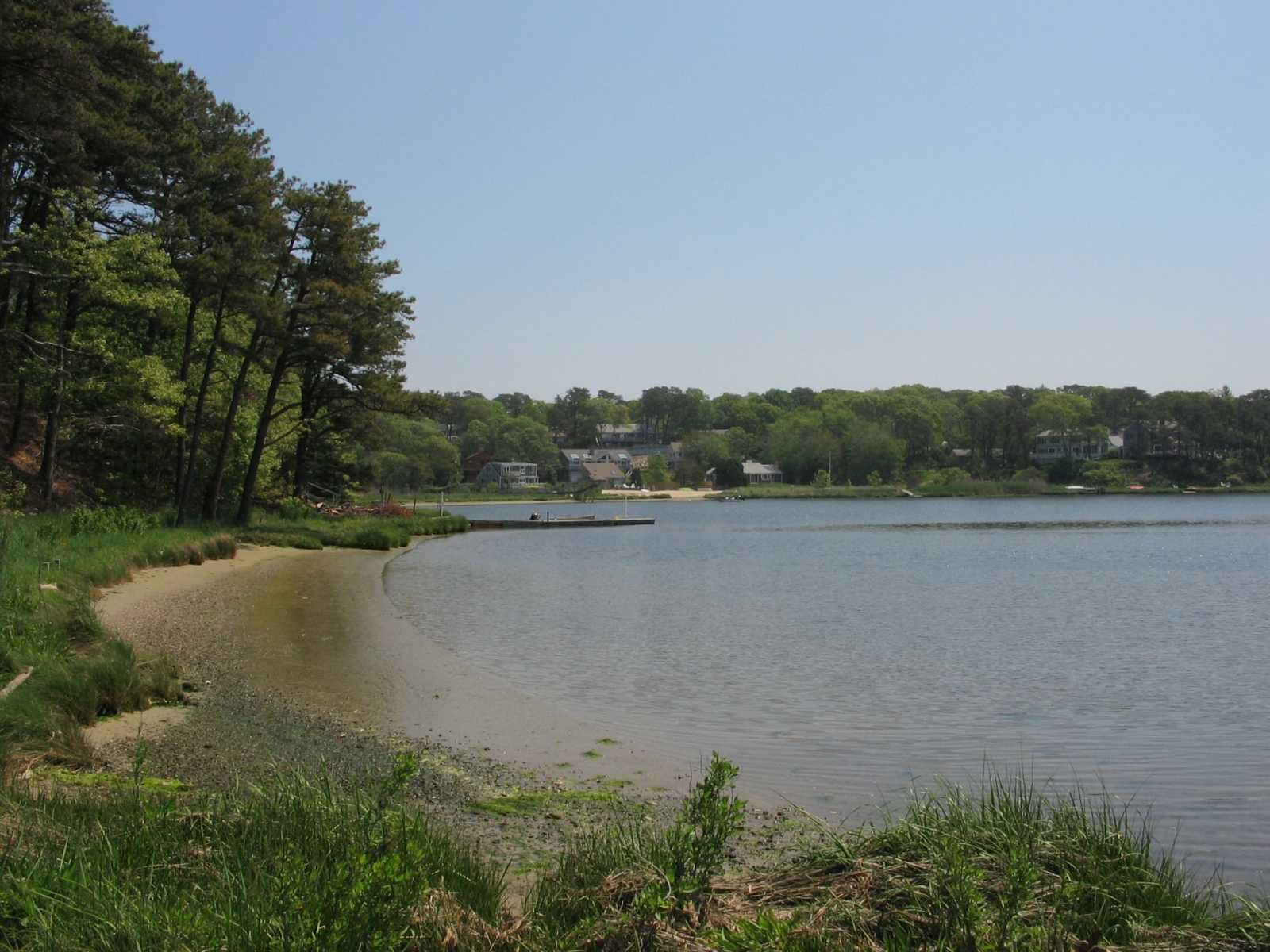
- from Yarmouth Port

- Location within Massachusetts Location within the United States
- Location: Dennis / Yarmouth, Cape Cod, Massachusetts, United States
- Coordinates: 41°42′15″N 70°10′45″W
- Type: brackish
- Primary outflows: Bass River
- Basin countries: United States

Follins Pond is a brackish lake located on Cape Cod, separating the towns of Dennis, Massachusetts, and Yarmouth, Massachusetts. The lake is connected to Nantucket Sound via the Bass River.

== Purported connection to Vinland ==
Follins Pond is noteworthy primarily because there has been an attempt to connect it to the semi-legendary lost Norse colony of Vinland. In the 1950s, Frederick J. Pohl investigated Follins Pond and claimed that he had located shore rocks along the pond into which were drilled holes that strongly resembled what he thought were Norse mooring stones. Birgitta Wallace has shown that nearby identical holes have made by settlers to use as blasting holes to split rock to use in foundations, the intact ones having been never been used. She said of this claim that "The 'mooring holes' are indeed in more aspects than one the most unbelievable archaeological evidence ever presented for Norse penetration into the American continent."

Additionally, Pohl claimed that he had uncovered the tops of posts about a foot underground, arranged in a pattern that might have been that of either a Norse shipyard or drydock. Further, at about the same time a claimed "Viking horse bone" may have been unearthed at Follins Pond. Pohl was of the opinion that at least a few horses were brought from Greenland by the Norse on their further voyages of exploration.

The theory about a Viking connection with Follins Pond is not taken seriously by professional historians, as the evidence presented is rather scant and no archaeological finds of any significance have been made in the area since. A report by the Massachusetts Archaeological Society concluded that this was probably a colonial repair yard and that a shipwright's axe was discovered there.

Bernard W. Powell discussed the supposed Viking horse bone in a later report in the same journal, concluding that "It is at once apparent that this is no really substantial ground on which to postulate that the bone represents remains of an animal brought to North America by Vikings in the 11th century. On the basis'of present knowledge we can no longer entertain this find as evidence for the presence of Norsemen on Cape Cod."

Some of the road names around Follins Pond have however been named to reflect this theory. A Norsemans Beach Road can be found on the eastern shore of the lake, a Norse Road on the north shore of the lake, and a Valhalla Drive and Erik's Path close to the south shore. Additionally, along the shore of a smaller body of water known as Kelleys Bay joined to Follins Pond by the Bass River can be found Vinland Drive, Skerry Road, Saga Road, Fiord Drive, Freydis Drive, and Lief Ericson Drive (sic). Further south, along the shores of the Bass River, can be found Lief's Lane, Legend Drive, Old Saga Drive, Rune Stone Road, Viking Rock Road, Keel Cape Drive, Erickson Way, and Mooring Lane.

In addition, articles about the purported past of Follins Pond occasionally turn up in the Cape Cod Times and other local newspapers.

== See also ==
- Waquoit Bay

== Other sources ==
- Pohl, Frederick J. (1957) The Vikings on Cape Cod: Evidence from an Archaeological Discovery (Pictou, Nova Scotia: Pictou Advocate Press)
