= Dennis Beaches =

Beaches in Massachusetts, United States

Coordinates: 41°40′37.25″N 70°10′40.50″W

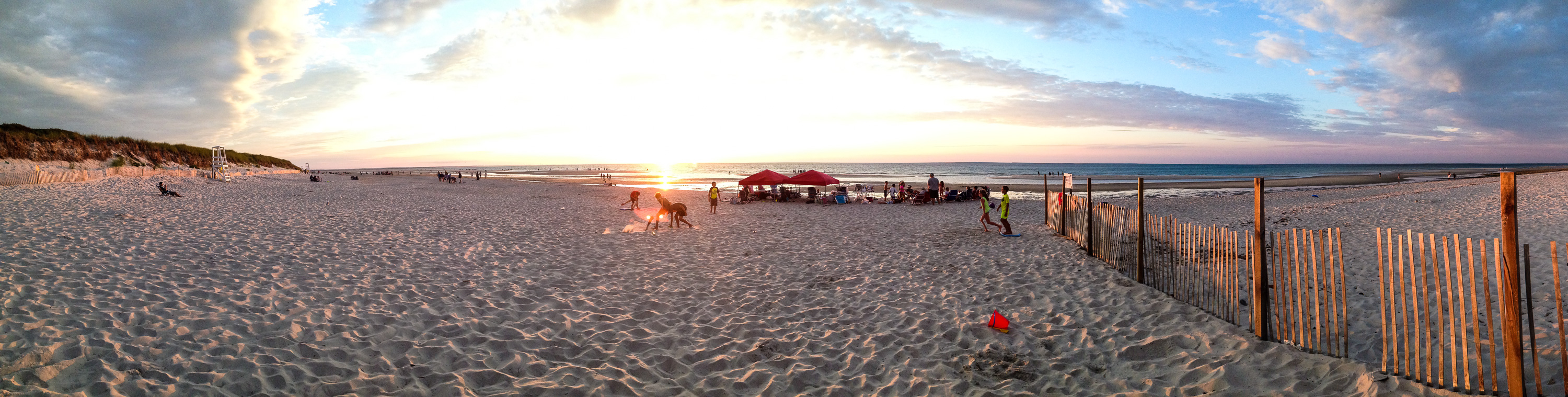
Mayflower Beach at sunset

The Dennis Beaches, are a series of beaches in Dennis, Massachusetts, on Cape Cod.

There are a total of eighteen beaches; sixteen located on the ocean and two located on fresh water ponds. Eight of the ocean beaches, Mayflower, Corporation, Bayview, Howes Street, Chapin Memorial, Cold Storage and Harbor View, are located on the northern (bay side) of the Cape and Islands.

The remainder of the beaches, including Depot Street, Glendon Rd, Haigis, Inman Rd., Raycroft, Sea Street, South Village and West Dennis, are located on the southern side of the Cape and Islands. Princess and Scargo, both on Scargo Lake, are the two fresh water ponds, and both are located on the northern side as well.

Chapin Memorial Beach, which was previously known as Black Flats for its black sands and extensive tidal flats, was named in honor of George H. Chapin, a real estate developer who donated the land to the Town after World War II. Corporation Beach, which is also sometimes called Nobscussett Beach, was named for the Nobscussett Point Pier Corporation. It is located on the east side of Nobscusset Point. Nobscussett is possibly related to the Algonquian word wanashqu, which means at the end of the rock.

Mayflower Beach was acquired by the Town in 1977 by eminent domain. It is named for the failed Mayflower Beach Condominiums Complex. At the other end of Mayflower Beach is Bayview Beach, which has a parking lot for residents only. Hippogriffe Road was named for a 678-ton clipper ship built in 1852 at the Shiverick Yards.

Glennon Road, and the beach named for the street, took their name from Hubert Glennon, a Marine officer who served as the Columbia University rowing coach after World War II, and who donated the beach to the village. To the west is Peter Hagis Beach, which is located on land donated by his widow. Also in the village is Inman Road Beach, named for the Inman family (including Isaiah Inman) who lived on the corner of Lower County Road. Raycroft Beach was named for Louis B. Raycroft, who often summered near Old Wharf Road and Sea Street.

Cold Storage Beach was named for the storehouses in the area that kept fish cold in the early 1900s. Aunt Julia Ann Road, and the beach by the same name, is found on the Bass River, across from the Bass River Golf Club. It is named for Julia Ann Baker, the third wife and widow of Levi Baker. West Dennis Beach was once known as Davis Beach, and the road that runs along the length of the beach is Davis Beach Road. Charles Henry Davis sold the beach to the Town in the early 1900s.

South Village Beach was named for the fishing hamlet once located in West Dennis called South Village.
