= Lighthouse Inn (New London, Connecticut) =

- U.S. National Register of Historic Places
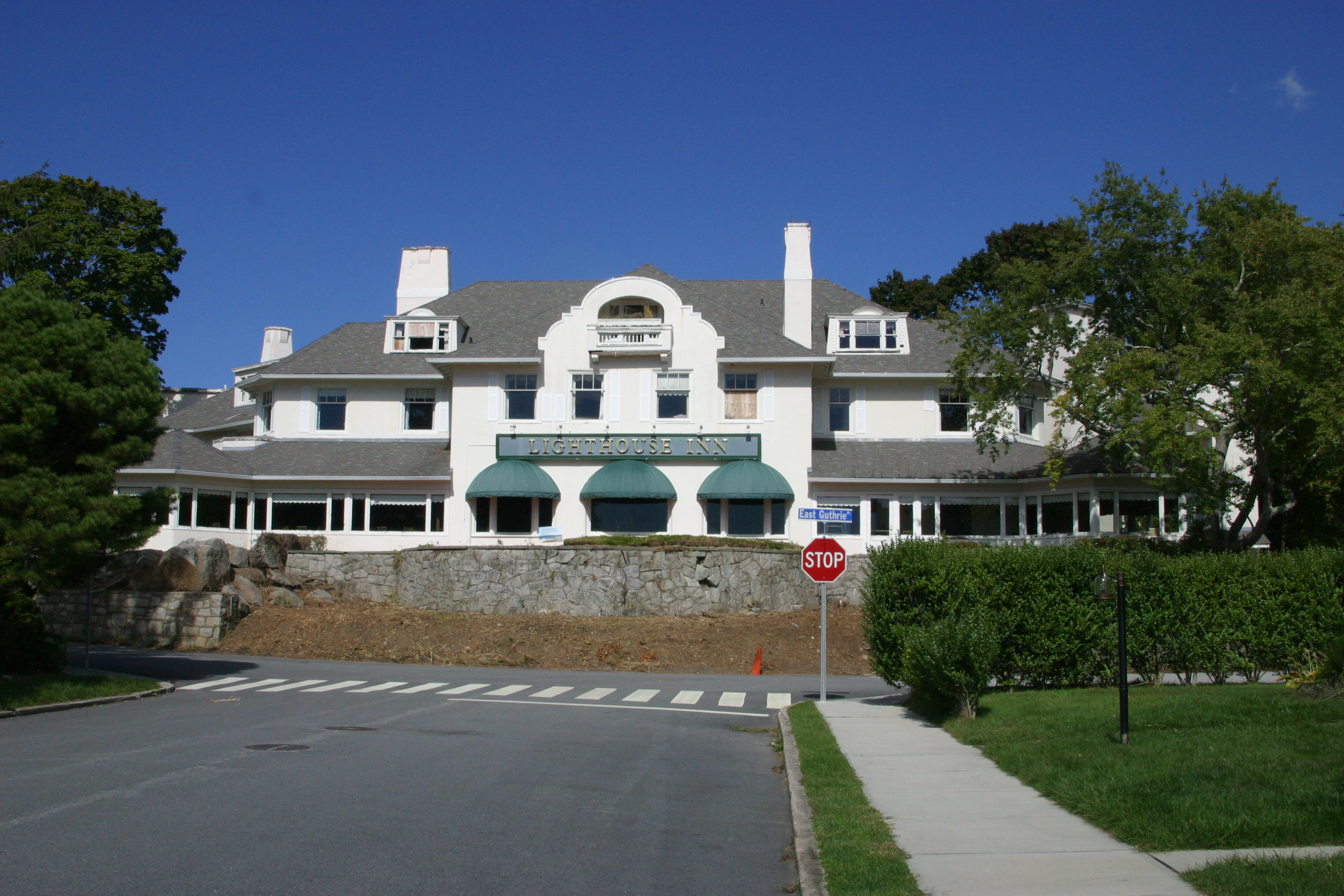

- Location within Connecticut Location within the United States
- Location: 6 Guthrie Place, New London, Connecticut
- Coordinates: 41°19′0″N 72°5′39″W
- Area: 2.8 acres (1.1 ha)
- Architect: Emerson, William Ralph
- Architectural style: Colonial Revival, Mission/Spanish Revival, Late 19th And 20th Century Revivals
- NRHP reference No.: 96000822
- Added to NRHP: August 1, 1996

The Lighthouse Inn, originally known as Meadow Court, is a Colonial Revival hotel building at 6 Guthrie Place in New London, Connecticut. The Mission style main house was designed by William Ralph Emerson and built in 1902 as a country home for steel industry magnate Charles S. Guthrie. It is one of the few examples of this architectural style in the city, and became a popular dining and event venue after opening as an inn in 1927. The building and surviving estate remnants were listed on the National Register of Historic Places in 1996. It was listed for sale by the city in February 2014, with historic preservation restrictions.

== Description and history ==
The Lighthouse Inn is located in southern New London on a rock promontory overlooking Long Island Sound. Guthrie Place, the former drive of the estate, leads north from the coast to the main house, which stands on 2.8 acres (1.1 ha) of land that still has traces of landscape design by the Olmsted Brothers. The main house is a two-story structure with Mission styling, finished in stucco with a broad hipped roof supported by large decorative brackets. A projecting two-story central section is flanked by enclosed single-story porches. The interior of the house retains many period finishes, despite its alteration for use as an inn and a fire in 1979. Outbuildings on the property include heavily modified carriage house, guest house, and gazebo.

The property was developed as a summer estate in the early 20th century by the Guthries, their decision to locate here spurred in part by the Pequot Colony resort area located nearby. Charles Guthrie died unexpectedly in 1906, and his widow Frances began summering on Long Island. She began selling off parts of the estate for development in 1925, and the main house was converted into an inn in 1927. The inn was popular with Hollywood stars in the 1940s and was a popular dining and event venue, competing with downtown hotels for business.

== See also ==
- Lighthouse Inn (West Dennis, Massachusetts)
- National Register of Historic Places listings in New London County, Connecticut
