= East Dennis, Massachusetts =

- Census-designated place
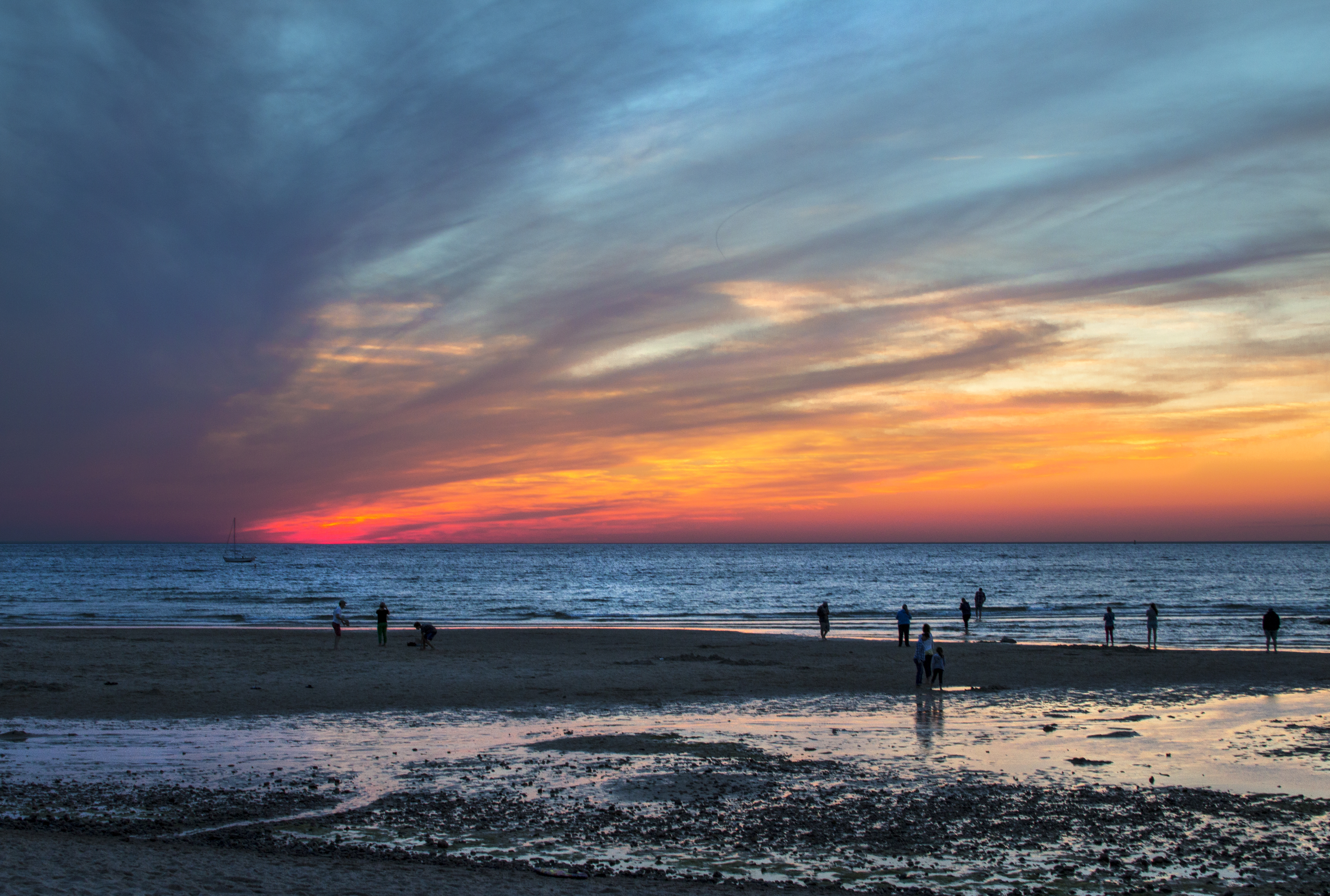
- Sunset at East Dennis

- Location in Barnstable County and the state of Massachusetts.
- Coordinates: 41°44′25″N 70°9′26″W
- Country: United States
- State: Massachusetts
- County: Barnstable
- Town: Dennis

Area
  - Total: 4.98 sq mi (12.90 km^{2})
  - Land: 4.83 sq mi (12.52 km^{2})
  - Water: 0.15 sq mi (0.38 km^{2})
- Elevation: 26 ft (8 m)

Population (2020)
  - Total: 2,585
  - Density: 534.7/sq mi (206.43/km^{2})
- Time zone: UTC-5 (Eastern (EST))
  - Summer (DST): UTC-4 (EDT)
- ZIP Codes: 02641 (East Dennis); 02638 (Dennis); 02660 (South Dennis)
- Area code: 508
- FIPS code: 25-18840
- GNIS feature ID: 0615830

East Dennis is a village and census-designated place (CDP) in the town of Dennis in Barnstable County, Massachusetts, United States. It was settled in the 1630s. As of the 2020 census, East Dennis had a population of 2,585.

== Geography ==
East Dennis is located in the northeastern part of the town of Dennis. East Dennis is north of South Dennis. The zip code of East Dennis (02641). Directly to the west is the village of Dennis. East Dennis is bounded to the north by Cape Cod Bay and to the west by the town of Brewster. It includes Sea Street Beach, Cold Storage Beach, and Crowes Pasture Beach on the bayside.

According to the United States Census Bureau, the East Dennis CDP has a total area of 4.9 square miles (12.8 km^{2}), of which 4.8 square miles (12.4 km^{2}) is land and 0.15 square miles (0.4 km^{2}) (3.01%) is water.

== Demographics ==
Historical population
Census	Pop.	Note	%±
2020	2,585		—
U.S. Decennial Census

=== 2020 census ===
As of the 2020 census, East Dennis had a population of 2,585. The median age was 65.1 years. 7.9% of residents were under the age of 18 and 50.2% of residents were 65 years of age or older. For every 100 females there were 83.1 males, and for every 100 females age 18 and over there were 83.5 males age 18 and over.

100.0% of residents lived in urban areas, while 0.0% lived in rural areas.

There were 1,324 households in East Dennis, of which 10.0% had children under the age of 18 living in them. Of all households, 50.2% were married-couple households, 16.5% were households with a male householder and no spouse or partner present, and 29.7% were households with a female householder and no spouse or partner present. About 35.1% of all households were made up of individuals and 24.0% had someone living alone who was 65 years of age or older.

There were 2,352 housing units, of which 43.7% were vacant. The homeowner vacancy rate was 0.8% and the rental vacancy rate was 7.8%.

Racial composition as of the 2020 census
Race	Number	Percent
White	2,409	93.2%
Black or African American	48	1.9%
American Indian and Alaska Native	6	0.2%
Asian	16	0.6%
Native Hawaiian and Other Pacific Islander	0	0.0%
Some other race	31	1.2%
Two or more races	75	2.9%
Hispanic or Latino (of any race)	48	1.9%

=== 2000 census ===
As of the census of 2000, there were 3,299 people, 1,516 households, and 1,027 families residing in the CDP. The population density was 265.4 people/km^{2} (687 people/mi^{2}). There were 2,203 housing units at an average density of 177.2 units/km^{2} (459 units/mi^{2}). The racial makeup of the CDP was 97.09% White, 0.79% African American, 0.21% Native American, 0.33% Asian, 0.73% from other races, and 0.85% from two or more races. Hispanic or Latino of any race were 1.67% of the population.

There were 1,516 households, out of which 16.8% had children under the age of 18 living with them, 58.6% were married couples living together, 7.6% had a female householder with no husband present, and 32.2% were non-families. 28.8% of all households were made up of individuals, and 18.5% had someone living alone who was 65 years of age or older. The average household size was 2.17 and the average family size was 2.62.

In the CDP, the population was spread out, with 15.7% under the age of 18, 3.5% from 18 to 24, 17.2% from 25 to 44, 29.4% from 45 to 64, and 34.3% who were 65 years of age or older. The median age was 55 years. For every 100 females, there were 84.4 males. For every 100 females age 18 and over, there were 83.3 males.

The median income for a household in the CDP was $47,857, and the median income for a family was $57,177. Males had a median income of $46,627 versus $30,230 for females. The per capita income for the CDP was $27,466. About 5.6% of families and 7.7% of the population were below the poverty line, including 18.2% of those under age 18 and 1.9% of those age 65 or over.

== Notable people ==
Notable current and former residents of East Dennis include:

- Scott Corbett (1913–2006), author of 69 children's books and six novels, including We Chose Cape Cod (1953), describing East Dennis in fascinating detail
- Edward Gelsthorpe (1923–2009), marketing executive called "Cranapple Ed" for his best-known product launch
- Anna Howard Shaw (1847–1919), first American woman ordained Methodist Protestant minister
- Gertrude Lawrence (1898–1952), British star of stage musicals and comedies; had a summer home in East Dennis from 1940.
