= South Dennis, Massachusetts =

- Census-designated place
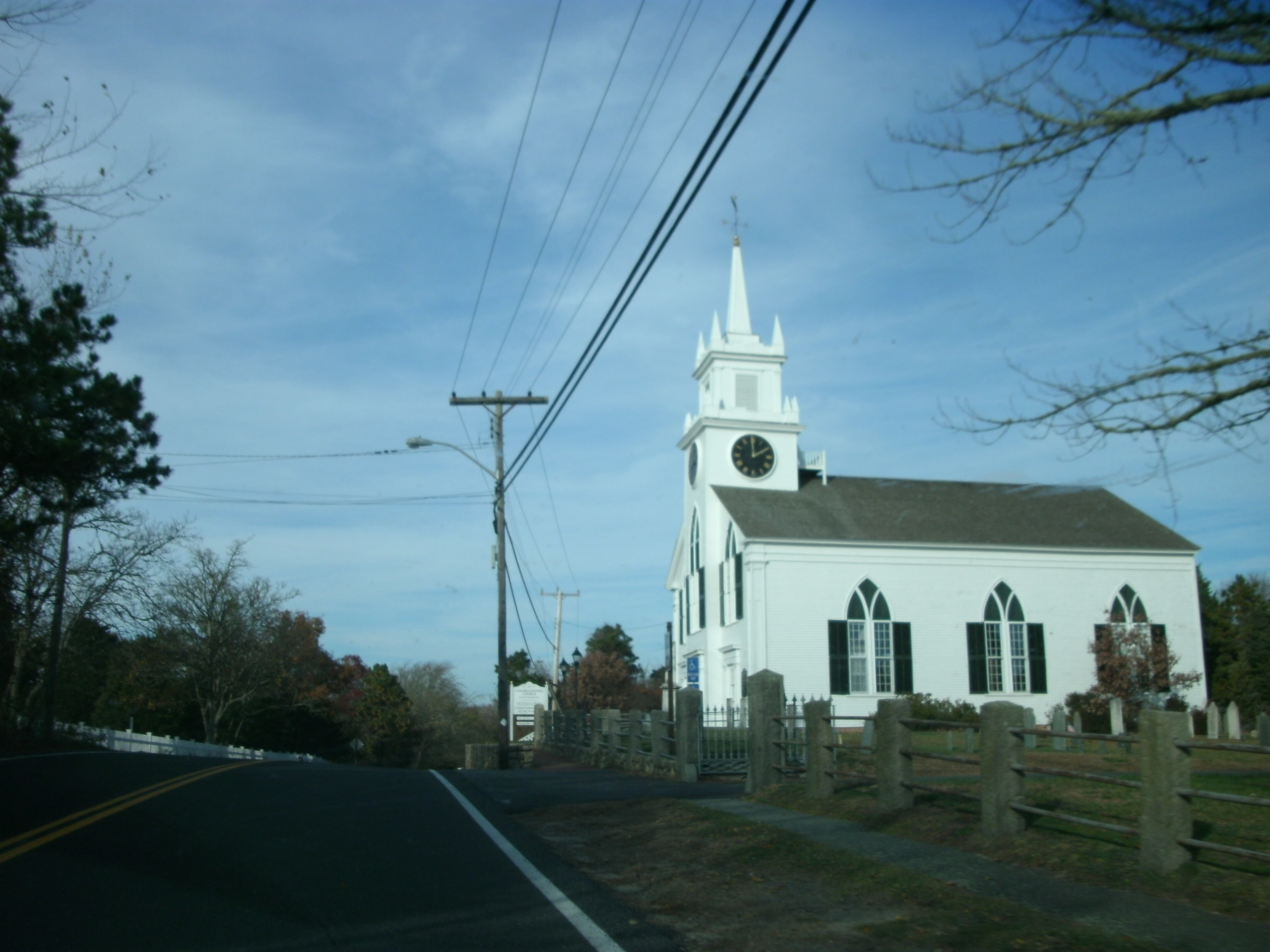
- South Dennis Congregational Church

- Location in Barnstable County and the state of Massachusetts.
- Coordinates: 41°42′21″N 70°9′45″W
- Country: United States
- State: Massachusetts
- County: Barnstable
- Town: Dennis

Area
  - Total: 4.75 sq mi (12.30 km^{2})
  - Land: 4.55 sq mi (11.79 km^{2})
  - Water: 0.20 sq mi (0.52 km^{2})
- Elevation: 33 ft (10 m)

Population (2020)
  - Total: 3,899
  - Density: 856.9/sq mi (330.84/km^{2})
- Time zone: UTC-5 (Eastern (EST))
  - Summer (DST): UTC-4 (EDT)
- ZIP code: 02660
- Area code: 508
- FIPS code: 25-63655
- GNIS feature ID: 0615880

South Dennis is a census-designated place (CDP) in the town of Dennis in Barnstable County, Massachusetts, United States. As of the 2020 census, South Dennis had a population of 3,899. It is the largest of the five CDPs in Dennis.

== Geography ==
South Dennis is located on Cape Cod, in the center of the town of Dennis at 41°42′21″N 70°9′45″W. It is bordered by the town of Brewster to the northeast, the town of Harwich to the southeast, the CDPs of Dennis Port to the south and West Dennis to the southwest, the town of Yarmouth to the west, and the CDPs of Dennis and East Dennis to the north.

According to the United States Census Bureau, the South Dennis CDP has a total area of 4.7 square miles (12.3 km^{2}), of which 4.6 square miles (11.8 km^{2}) is land, and 0.19 square miles (0.5 km^{2}) (4.19%) is water.

== Demographics ==
Historical population
Census	Pop.	Note	%±
2020	3,899		—
U.S. Decennial Census

=== 2020 census ===
As of the 2020 census, South Dennis had a population of 3,899. The median age was 55.6 years. 14.3% of residents were under the age of 18 and 33.1% of residents were 65 years of age or older. For every 100 females, there were 91.0 males, and for every 100 females age 18 and over, there were 87.5 males age 18 and over.

100.0% of residents lived in urban areas, while 0.0% lived in rural areas.

There were 1,821 households in South Dennis, of which 17.8% had children under the age of 18 living in them. Of all households, 42.8% were married-couple households, 17.6% were households with a male householder and no spouse or partner present, and 33.2% were households with a female householder and no spouse or partner present. About 35.1% of all households were made up of individuals, and 19.3% had someone living alone who was 65 years of age or older.

There were 2,812 housing units, of which 35.2% were vacant. The homeowner vacancy rate was 1.8%, and the rental vacancy rate was 6.0%.

Racial composition as of the 2020 census
Race	Number	Percent
White	3,394	87.0%
Black or African American	173	4.4%
American Indian and Alaska Native	12	0.3%
Asian	21	0.5%
Native Hawaiian and Other Pacific Islander	2	0.1%
Some other race	84	2.2%
Two or more races	213	5.5%
Hispanic or Latino (of any race)	117	3.0%

=== 2000 census ===
As of the 2000 census, there were 3,679 people, 1,681 households, and 1,059 families residing in the CDP. The population density was 312.2/km^{2} (808.3/mi^{2}). There were 2,468 housing units at an average density of 209.4/km^{2} (542.3/mi^{2}). The racial makeup of the CDP was 95.41% White, 1.01% African American, 0.60% Native American, 0.35% Asian, 0.90% from other races, and 1.74% from two or more races. Hispanic or Latino of any race were 1.30% of the population.

There were 1,681 households, out of which 23.7% had children under the age of 18 living with them, 48.7% were married couples living together, 10.9% had a female householder with no husband present, and 37.0% were non-families. Of all households, 31.4% were made up of individuals, and 16.0% had someone living alone who was 65 years of age or older. The average household size was 2.19 and the average family size was 2.74.

In the CDP, the population was spread out, with 20.3% under the age of 18, 4.2% from 18 to 24, 24.8% from 25 to 44, 26.1% from 45 to 64, and 24.6% who were 65 years of age or older. The median age was 46 years. For every 100 females, there were 83.4 males. For every 100 females age 18 and over, there were 78.8 males.

The median income for a household in the CDP was $40,330, and the median income for a family was $47,935. Males had a median income of $35,026 versus $26,818 for females. The per capita income for the CDP was $22,974. About 2.0% of families and 3.2% of the population were below the poverty line, including 0.7% of those under age 18 and 3.7% of those age 65 or over.

== Education ==
N. H. Wixon Innovation School (grades 4–5) is a public school in South Dennis. The school was named after prominent Dennisport fisherman Nathaniel H. Wixon, a descendant of more than 15 of the original Mayflower Pilgrims.
