= Scargo Lake =

Lake in Massachusetts, United States

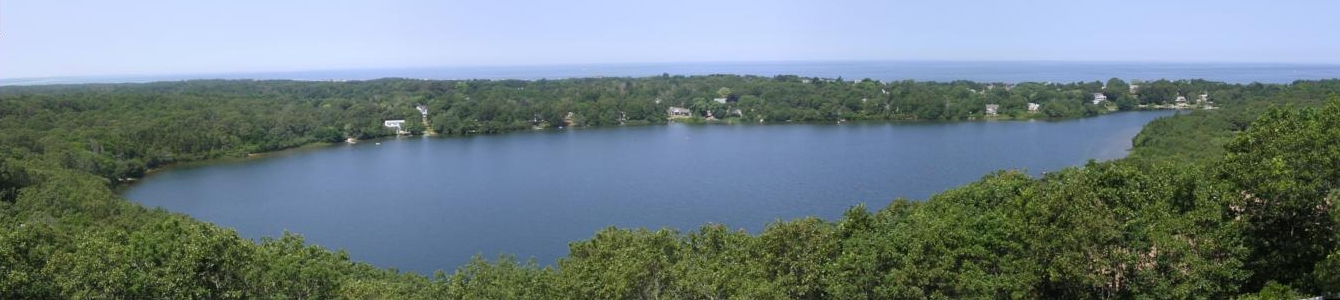
- Scargo Lake from Scargo Tower

- Location within Massachusetts Location within the United States
- Location: Dennis, Massachusetts, United States
- Coordinates: 41°44′35″N 70°11′00″W
- Type: Fresh
- Primary outflows: Sesuit Creek
- Max. length: 0.52 m (1 ft 8 in)
- Surface area: 60 acres (24 ha)
- Average depth: 25 ft (7.6 m)
- Max. depth: 48 Feet (14.63 Meters)

Scargo Lake is a fresh water kettle pond in Dennis, Massachusetts on Cape Cod.

== History of formation ==
There are many Native American legends about the formation of Scargo Lake, and all are some variant of a tale of Princess Scargo. One story is that a man from another tribe brought the princess four fish, and he promised to return before the fish died. The princess was said to have had a small pond dug to keep the fish in, but woke one morning to find that the pond had dried up, and all but one fish had died. Her tears kept the last fish alive until her father dug a lake for it. The boundary of this lake was determined by where four arrows of a tribesman landed. Once the lake was complete, the fish survived, and the man from the other tribe fulfilled his promise to return to the princess.

More commonly heard is the story of a princess who was given three fish in a pumpkin by a young brave going off to war. He was gone so long that the fish began to outgrow the pumpkin. She then had the women of the village dig out the pond with clam shells so the fish could survive. The dirt the women dug out became Scargo Hill. Today it is the highest hill in the mid-Cape area.

Another legend is very similar, but she dug a hole in the ground (considered by many to be fish-shaped). The dirt from the hole was said to become the 160-foot Scargo Hill, and that the hole filled up with water from the heavy autumn rains, which also drowned the princess. She was seen as a sacrifice, and the reason the lake is well stocked with fish. Another says that an Indian named Maushop dug out the pond, and then lit his pipe. The smoke from the pipe attracted dark clouds from which rain fell and filled the pond.

== Beaches ==
There are two public beaches on Scargo Lake: Princess Beach, which is sandy and Scargo Beach, which has sand dumped in the water, but no sandy area by the water.

== Fishing ==
Scargo Lake is stocked in spring and fall with brook, brown, and rainbow trout, all of which are allowed to be fished. A wide shelf of shallow water makes for easy wading and access to deeper water. This shelf makes Scargo Lake a popular pond for fly fishing. Scargo Lake is located between Massachusetts Route 6A and Scargo Hill Road, and is easily reached off of route 6A. There are three town landings, all of which are suitable for launching light draft boats and canoes. Two are accessible via dirt roads immediately off Route 6A on the western side, and the remaining one on the northern cove can be reached from an unnamed road off the intersection of Route 6A and Sesuit Neck Road. A 7.5 horsepower limit on outboard motors is enforced by the town.

== See also ==
- Scargo Tower
