= West Dennis Light =

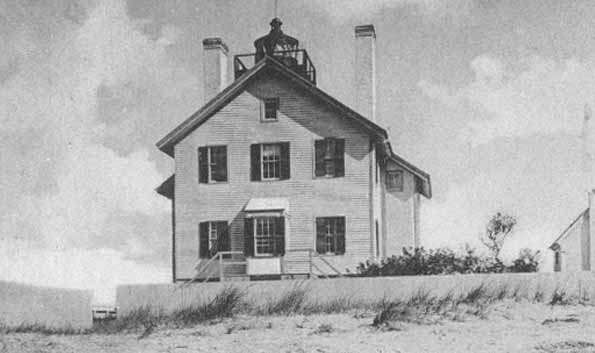
- The original building before enlargement
- Location: West Dennis, Massachusetts
- Coordinates: 41°39′6.24″N 70°10′9.07″W

Tower
- Constructed: 1855
- Foundation: Brick
- Construction: Iron tower on wood house
- Shape: Conical on dwelling roof
- Markings: White with red trim

Light
- First lit: 1855
- Deactivated: 1880-81; 1914-89
- Focal height: 44 ft (13 m)
- Lens: 5th order Fresnel lens (original), 300 mm (current)
- Range: 12 nm
- Characteristic: Flashing White every 6s

West Dennis Light is a lighthouse in West Dennis, Massachusetts. It was previously known as Bass River Light. It is owned by and sits on top of the Lighthouse Inn, a seasonal hotel.

== Creation ==
During the early 1800s Bass River was an important safe harbor for schooners and fishing ships in Nantucket Sound. At that time, a small light was placed in the upper window of a private home to help mariners in the area. In 1850, the federal government of the United States appropriated $4000 to build a lighthouse near the breakwater at the mouth of Bass River. In 1854, construction began on the light and keepers home. As was typical of early Cape Cod style lighthouses, the light tower was an integral part of the keepers house, centered atop the dwelling's roof. Because most of these structures leaked significantly, they were replaced with self-standing towers; the West Dennis Light is the only remaining lighthouse on Cape Cod built with this design. The light was lit in 1855, and continued in service until 1880, when the Lighthouse Service decided the Bass River Light was no longer necessary since a new light had been built at Stage Harbor in Chatham. After many complaints, the light was relit a year later.

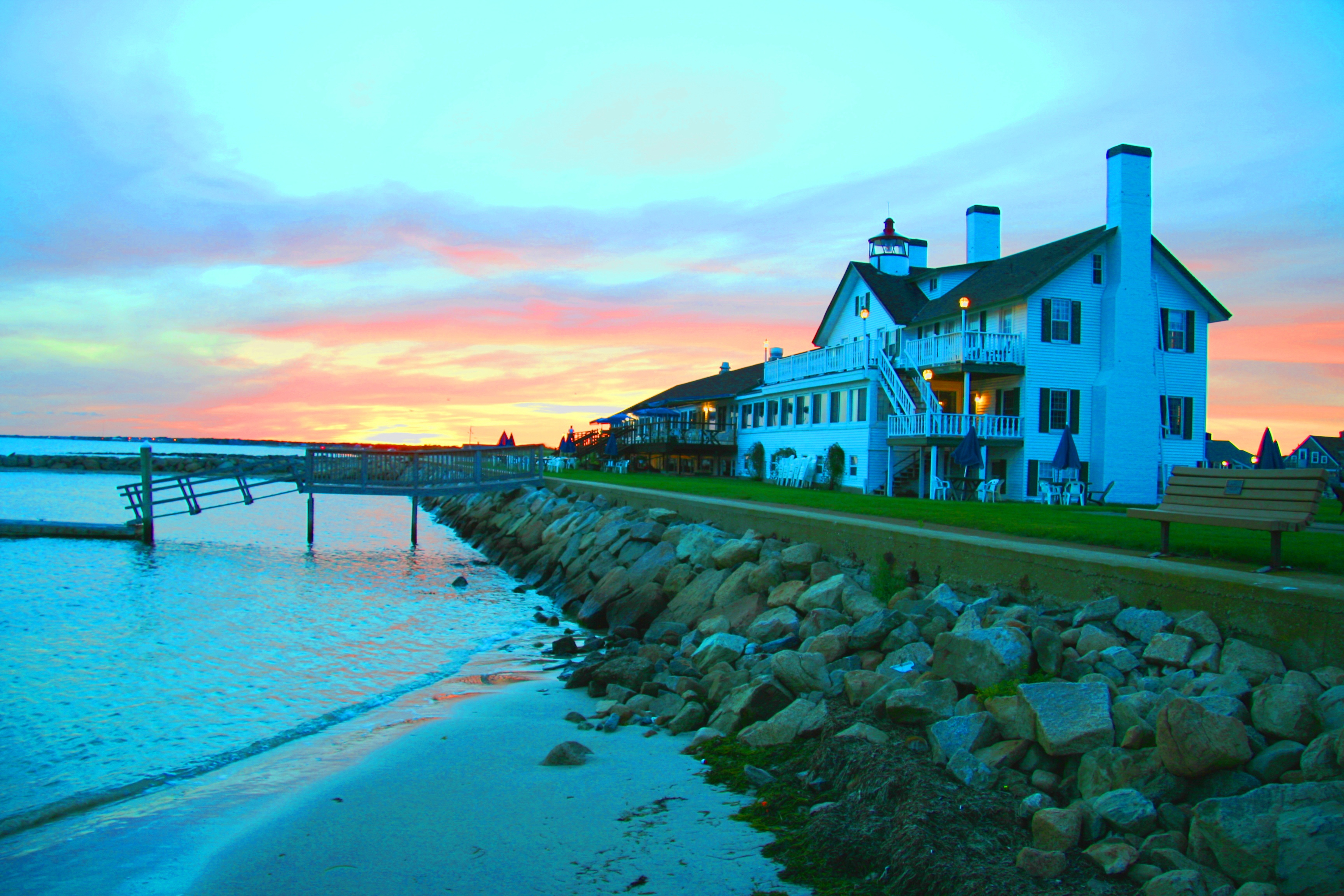
The Lighthouse Inn

== Deactivation and hotel use ==
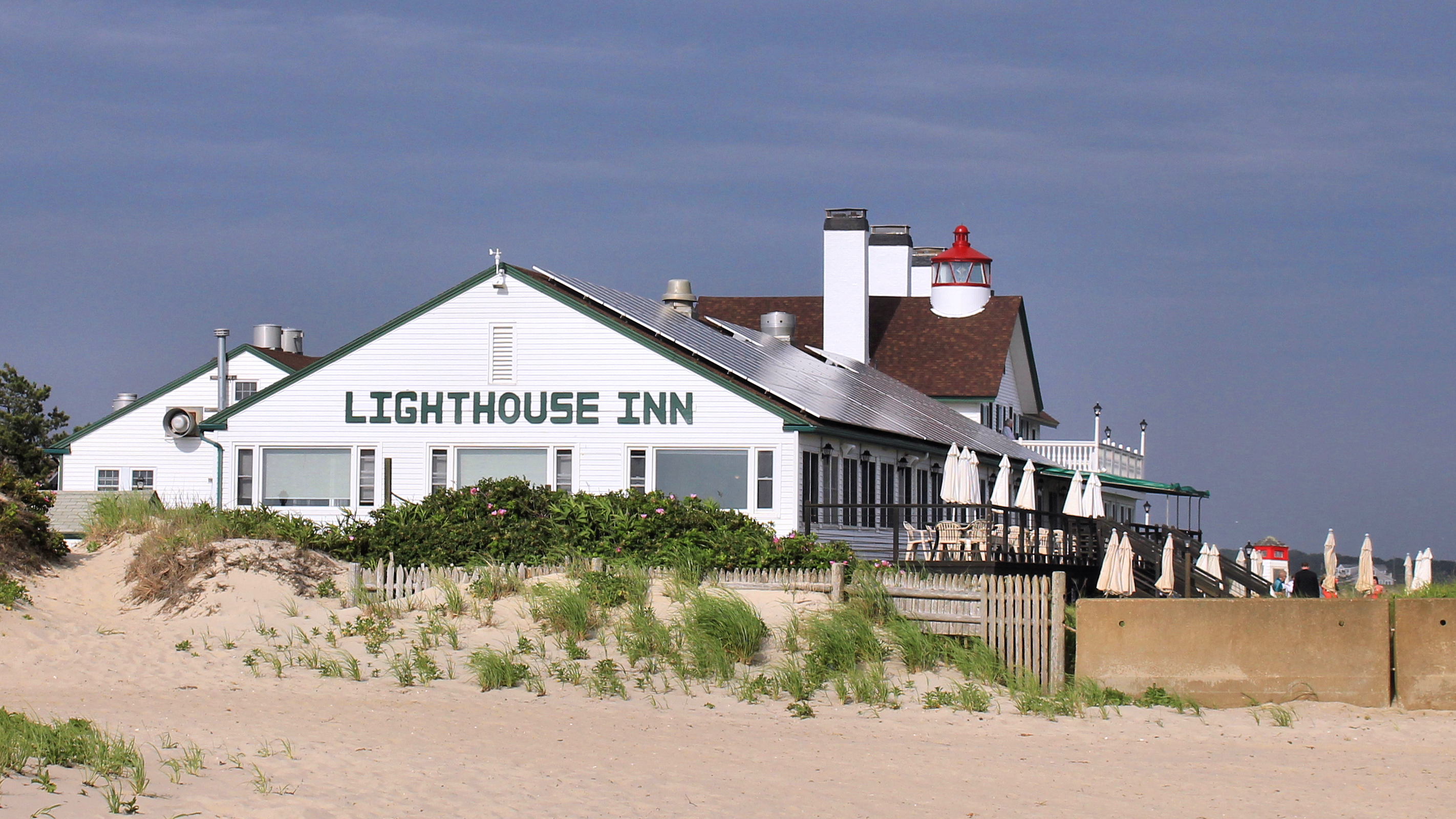
The Lighthouse Inn in 2017.

The light was discontinued again in 1914. The opening of the Cape Cod Canal had substantially reduced traffic in Nantucket Sound and an automatic beacon, the Bass River West Jetty Light, had been installed at the entrance to Bass River. After being sold at auction, the Lighthouse property was purchased by Harry K. Noyes of the Noyes Buick Company in Boston. Noyes enlarged the Main House, built several cottages, and landscaped the grounds. After his death in 1933, the property was on the market for five years until State Senator Everett Stone purchased it. Stone was a developer from Auburn, Massachusetts who planned to develop the land and sell it. The papers on the land were passed too late in June to begin any construction, so he decided to take in overnight guests to help pay the mortgage. So many of the 1938 guests asked to return, Stone changed his mind about developing the land and began the Lighthouse Inn, which continues in the Stone family.

== Relighting ==
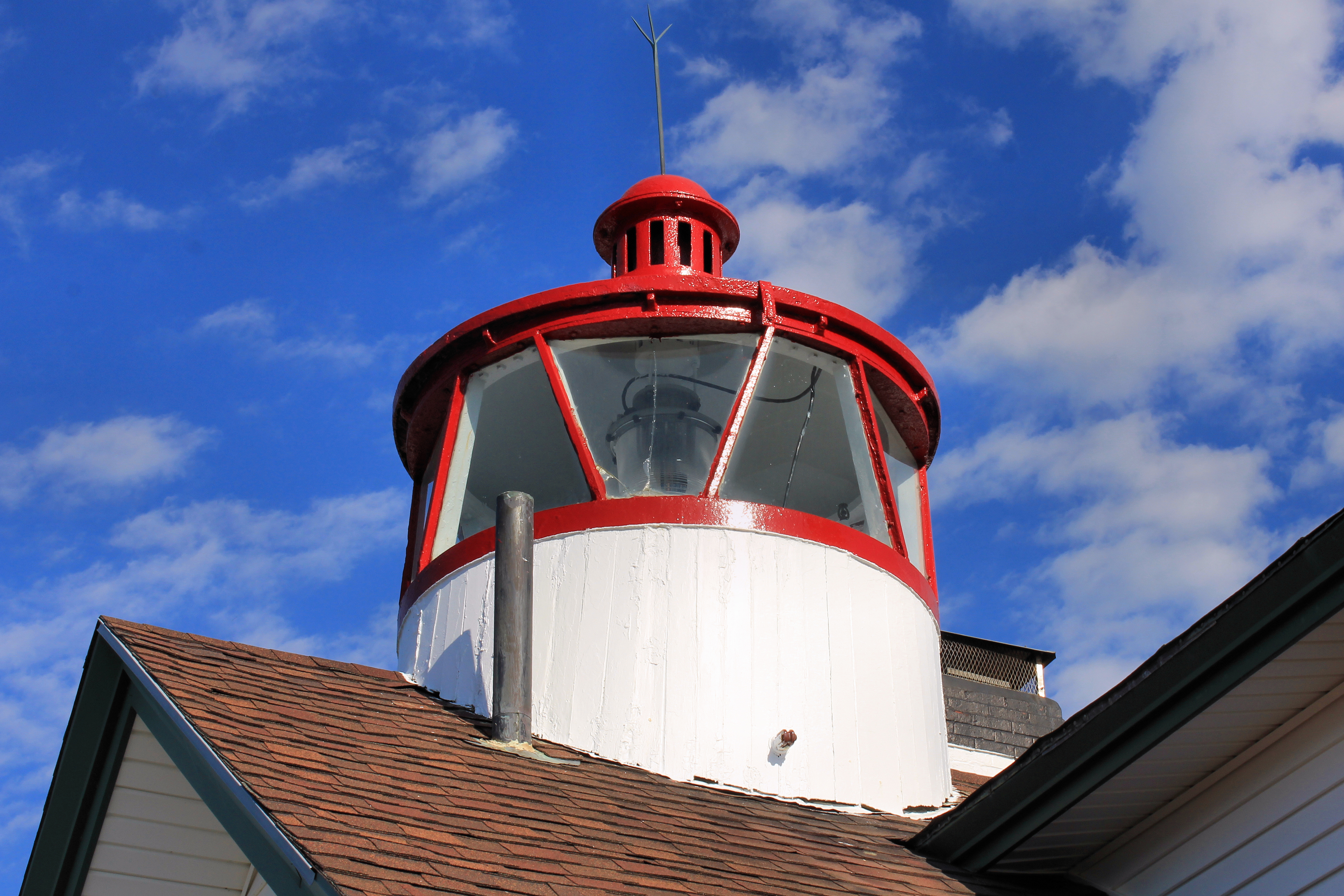
Contemporary view of the light.

After being dark for 75 years, the light itself was relit as one of a very few privately owned, privately maintained working lighthouses in the country. The light was relit on August 7, 1989, on the 200th anniversary of the U.S. Lighthouse Service, the U.S. Coast Guard. The light is lit only while the inn is open, from May 1 to October 31.
