= Isaiah Inman =

American deputy sheriff (1830–1889)

Isaiah C. Inman (July 23, 1830 – May 6, 1889) was sheriff of Barnstable County, Massachusetts in the late 19th-century. He previously served as a deputy sheriff and was a justice of the peace. Inman Road Beach in Dennis, Massachusetts is named for his family. He was buried in Swan Pond Cemetery in Dennis Port.
