= Scargo Tower =

Coordinates: 41.7395°N 70.1800°W

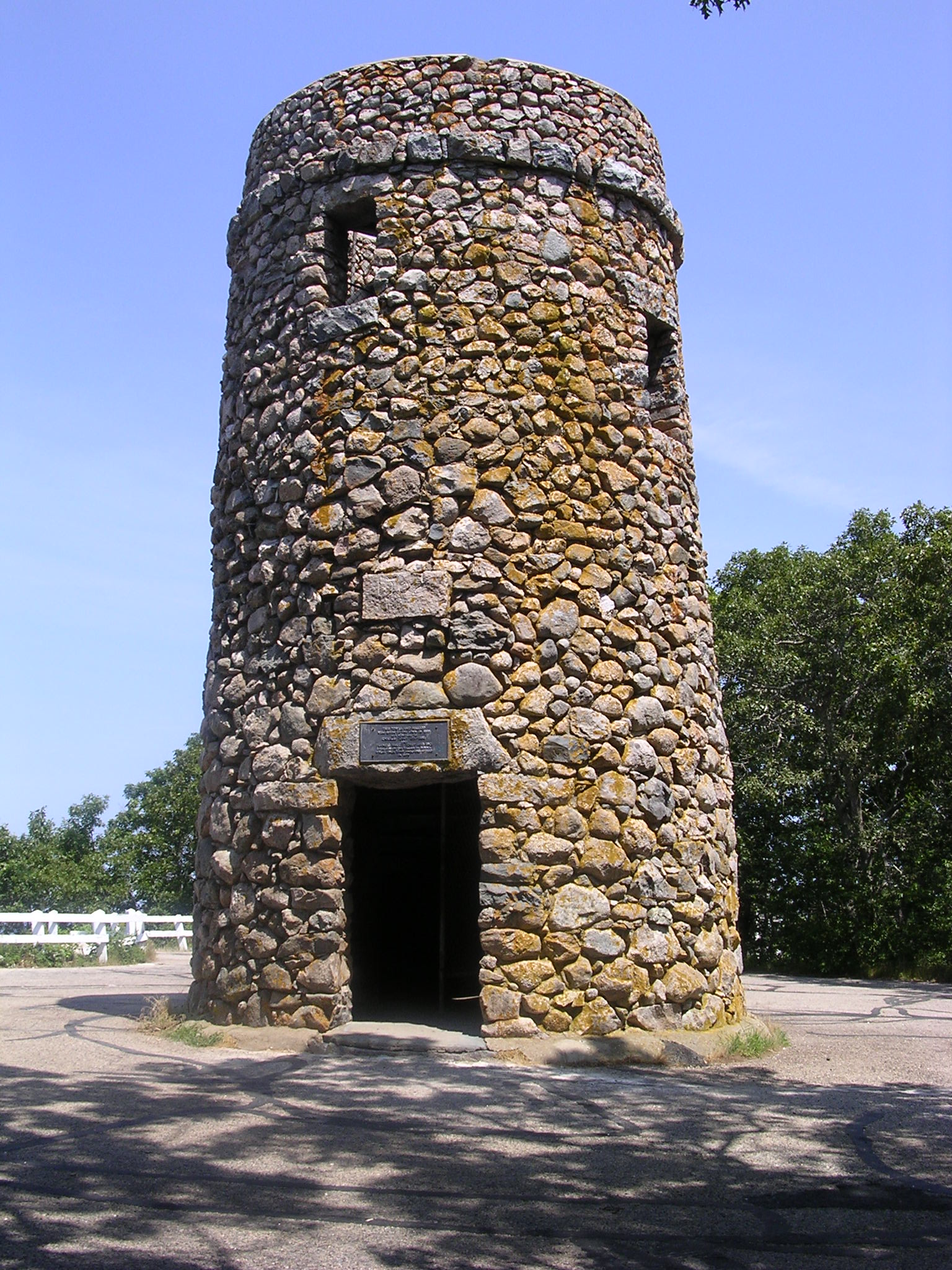
West side exterior of Scargo Tower, Dennis, Massachusetts

Scargo Tower is a 30-foot-tall (9.1 m) cobblestone tower located atop Scargo Hill in Dennis, Massachusetts on Cape Cod.

== History ==
There have been three Scargo towers at this spot. The first tower was built in 1874 by the Tobey family. Constructed out of wood, it was destroyed by a gale in 1876. The second tower, known as "Tobey Tower" and also made of wood, burned down in 1900. The present tower was built of cobblestone in 1901 as a memorial to the Tobey family.

The current tower, atop the area's tallest hill above the kettle of Scargo Lake, stands 30 feet high and 160 feet above sea level. The top of the tower provides a panoramic view that, on a clear day, extends as far as Provincetown and Gurnet Point.

The Scargo Tower plaque

A plaque placed above the entrance to the tower reads, "This tower and hilltop were given to the town of Dennis in 1929 as a memorial to Charles Tobey (1831–1888) and Francis Bassett Tobey (1833–1913). Loyal sons of the village of Dennis where their Tobey ancestors settled in 1678."

== Geography ==
View of Scargo Lake and Cape Cod Bay from the tower

Scargo tower sits atop Scargo Hill, one of the tallest [160 feet (49 m)] and best-known hills on Cape Cod. The tower is located in the town of Dennis, Massachusetts off of Scargo Hill road, to the south of Scargo Lake.
