= Mule (nomad) =

American nomad

John Sears, more commonly known as Mule (born 1947/48), is an American nomad. He has wandered the American West for nearly 40 years, with nearly 20 of those years spent with pack mules. He travels following the seasons, going to San Diego for the winter and then during the warmer months north up through the Central Valley to Sacramento.

== Biography ==
Mule grew up in the southern suburbs of San Francisco. As a child, he explored the orchard fields of Los Altos. He has lived a nomadic lifestyle since he was about 35 years old. He got his first mule in Spokane, Washington, to allow him to carry more supplies in his travels.

For many years, Mule wandered across different parts of the American West. After traveling the 295 miles between Las Vegas and Ely, Nevada, he noticed power lines, an early sign of coming development, in Bureau of Land Management land formerly used by the Shoshone Tribe that was supposed to remain undeveloped. He realized that he needed to speak out against such activity as it threatens not only his way of life, but the way of life he believes humans are supposed to live. He went west from Ely to California with the intent of communicating this to more people.

Filmmaker John McDonald came across Mule one day by chance. After developing a friendship, Mule agreed to allow McDonald to make a documentary film about him. McDonald filmed hundreds of hours of footage of Mule on his journeys and assisted him in setting up a Facebook page.

Mule frequently has issues with police who can be hostile to his lifestyle. In 2015, he was prevented from crossing the Golden Gate Bridge as animals, including dogs and horses, are forbidden from using the bridge's pedestrian path. He refused an offer of a trailer to transport the animals across the bridge. On January 23, 2020, he was arrested by the California Highway Patrol while traveling with his mules along G14 in Paso Robles. He was initially charged with resisting arrest, but the charge was later changed to refusal to obey a lawful order. In February 2020, the San Luis Obispo County District Attorney declined to file charges.

On January 21, 2021, Mule filed a lawsuit in San Luis Obispo Superior Court. He claimed his arrest by the California Highway Patrol "violated his right to intrastate roadside travel" and his "ages-old nomadic way of life". He sought financial damages as well as a judge's order to train law enforcement officers "that horses, mules, and livestock (accompanied by a person) have the right to use the public road". The lawsuit reflected Mule's belief in the "sacred relationship between man and horse to travel together with reverence and respect for this beautiful place in which we all reside called Earth". On July 28, 2022, the lawsuit was voluntarily dismissed after it became obvious that Mule was unlikely to prevail due to the doctrine of qualified immunity.
