= Frederick J. Pohl =

American writer (1889-1991)

Frederick Julius Pohl (August 18, 1889 – February 21, 1991) was a prolific playwright, literary critic, editor and book author. He is best known for his books espousing speculative and controversial historical theories of pre-Columbian trans-oceanic contact by Europeans, including the Vikings and others.

== Biography ==
Pohl was the husband of playwright/author Josephine McIlvain Pollitt (October 15, 1890 - August 1978; married Frederick in May 1926) and later Loretta M. Baker (née Champagne, 1906 - April 27, 2002; married Frederick in 1980). He graduated from Amherst College in 1911 and from Columbia University in 1914 with a Master of Arts.

=== Pohl's claims for Norse voyages to America ===
In his 1972 book The Viking Settlements of North America, Pohl investigated the saga of Thorfinn Karlsefni to demonstrate pre-Columbian Viking travels to America.

In a review of Pohl's The Viking Settlements of North America, Einar Haugen points out that Pohl's interpretation of the Vinland Map, now proven to be a hoax, "puts the Vikings in Cuba and the Gulf of Mexico. Haugen says that "On every page the author asserts that some notion has been "proved" beyond doubt or confirmed by "unquestionable evidence" when in fact the proof is achieved by neglecting counterevidence or by sheer fiat."

== Published work ==
- Pohl, Frederick J. (1961). Atlantic Crossings Before Columbus. New York: W. W. Norton.
- Pohl, Frederick J. (1966). Amerigo Vespucci: Pilot Major. New York: Octagon Books.
- Like to the Lark: The Early Years of Shakespeare. New York: Clarkson N. Potter. 1972.
- Pohl, Frederick J. (1983). William Shakespeare: A Biography. Rochester, NY: Dupont Books.
- The New Columbus. Rochester, NY: Dupont Books. 1986.
