= Dennis, Massachusetts =

Town in Massachusetts, United States

- Town
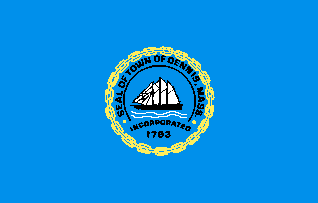
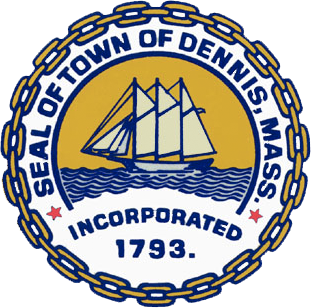
- Flag Seal

- Location in Barnstable County and the state of Massachusetts.
- Coordinates: 41°44′07″N 70°11′40″W
- Country: United States
- State: Massachusetts
- County: Barnstable
- Settled: 1639
- Incorporated: 1793
- Communities: Dennis; Dennis Port; East Dennis; South Dennis; West Dennis

Government
  - Type: Open town meeting
  - Town Administrator: Elizabeth Sullivan

Area
  - Total: 22.3 sq mi (57.7 km^{2})
  - Land: 20.5 sq mi (53.1 km^{2})
  - Water: 1.7 sq mi (4.5 km^{2})
- Elevation: 23 ft (7 m)

Population (2020)
  - Total: 14,674
  - Density: 716/sq mi (276.3/km^{2})
- Time zone: UTC-5 (Eastern)
  - Summer (DST): UTC-4 (Eastern)
- ZIP Codes: 02638 (Dennis); 02639 (Dennis Port); 02641 (East Dennis); 02660 (South Dennis); 02670 (West Dennis)
- Area code: 508 / 774
- FIPS code: 25-16775
- GNIS feature ID: 0618252
- Website: town.dennis.ma.us

Dennis is a town on Cape Cod in Massachusetts. It is a seaside resort town with colonial mansions along the northern Cape Cod Bay coastline and beaches along the southern Nantucket Sound. As of the 2020 census, its population was 14,674.

The town encompasses five villages, each with its own post office: Dennis (including North Dennis), Dennis Port, East Dennis, South Dennis, and West Dennis.

== History ==
Indigenous peoples have been living in the Cape Cod region for at least 9,000 years. The historic Algonquian-speaking Wampanoag are one of 69 tribes of the original Wampanoag Nation.

After being settled by English colonists of the New Plymouth Colony in 1639 as part of the town of Yarmouth, Dennis became known as the East Precinct. The northern sections of the town were called Nobscussett, Sesuit and Quivet by the original inhabitants.

The town was named after resident minister Reverend Josiah Dennis. Dennis officially separated from Yarmouth in 1793. Lacking farmable land, seafaring became the town's major industry in its early history. Beginning around the 1830s, activity in the area centered around the construction of boats in the Shiverick Shipyard.

The Cape Playhouse in northern Dennis, established in 1927, is the oldest summer theater in the United States. Notable past and present Dennis residents include author Mary Higgins Clark, actress Bette Davis, and actress Amy Jo Johnson.

== Geography ==
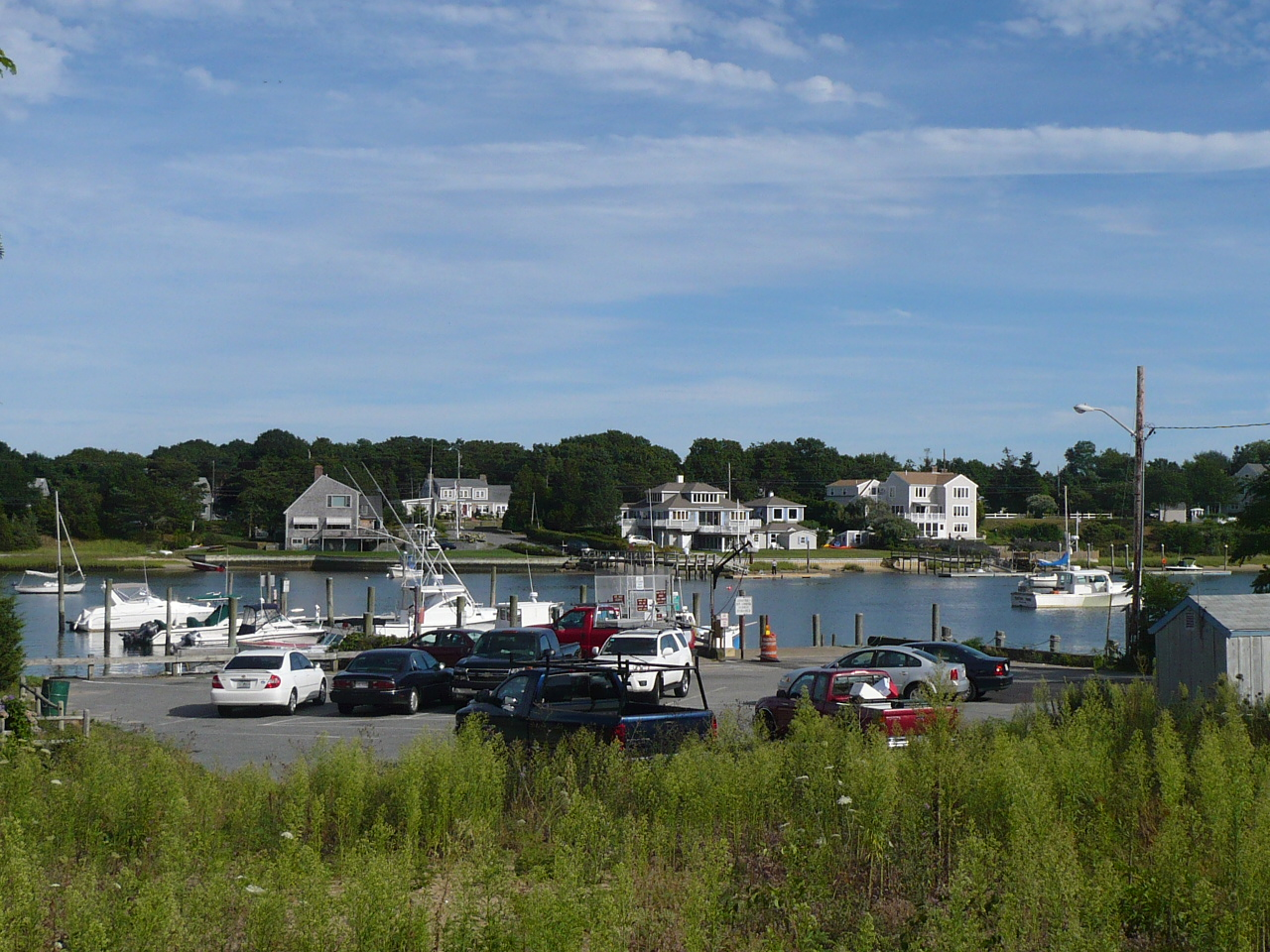
West Dennis on the bank of the Bass River

The town of Dennis spans the width of Cape Cod, with Cape Cod Bay to the north, Brewster to the northeast, Harwich to the southeast, Nantucket Sound to the south, and Yarmouth to the west. The town is about 10 miles (16 km) east of Barnstable, 24 miles (39 km) east of the Sagamore Bridge, and 78 miles (126 km) southeast of Boston.

According to the United States Census Bureau, the town has a total area of 22.3 square miles (57.7 km^{2}), of which 20.5 square miles (53.1 km^{2}) is land, and 1.7 square miles (4.5 km^{2}), or 7.88%, is water.

The town lies on the eastern banks of the Bass River, which almost divides the Cape in half. There are several small ponds and lakes in town, as well as Sesuit Harbor to the north and West Dennis Harbor to the south.

The level south side of the town was formed primarily from glacial outwash. Bass River and Swan Pond River were carved in the outwash plain by large flows of water off of Laurentide Ice Sheet of the Wisconsin glaciation.

The north and south shores of the town have many beaches, as well as the Dennis Yacht Club in the north and West Dennis Yacht Club in the south.

=== Dennis ===
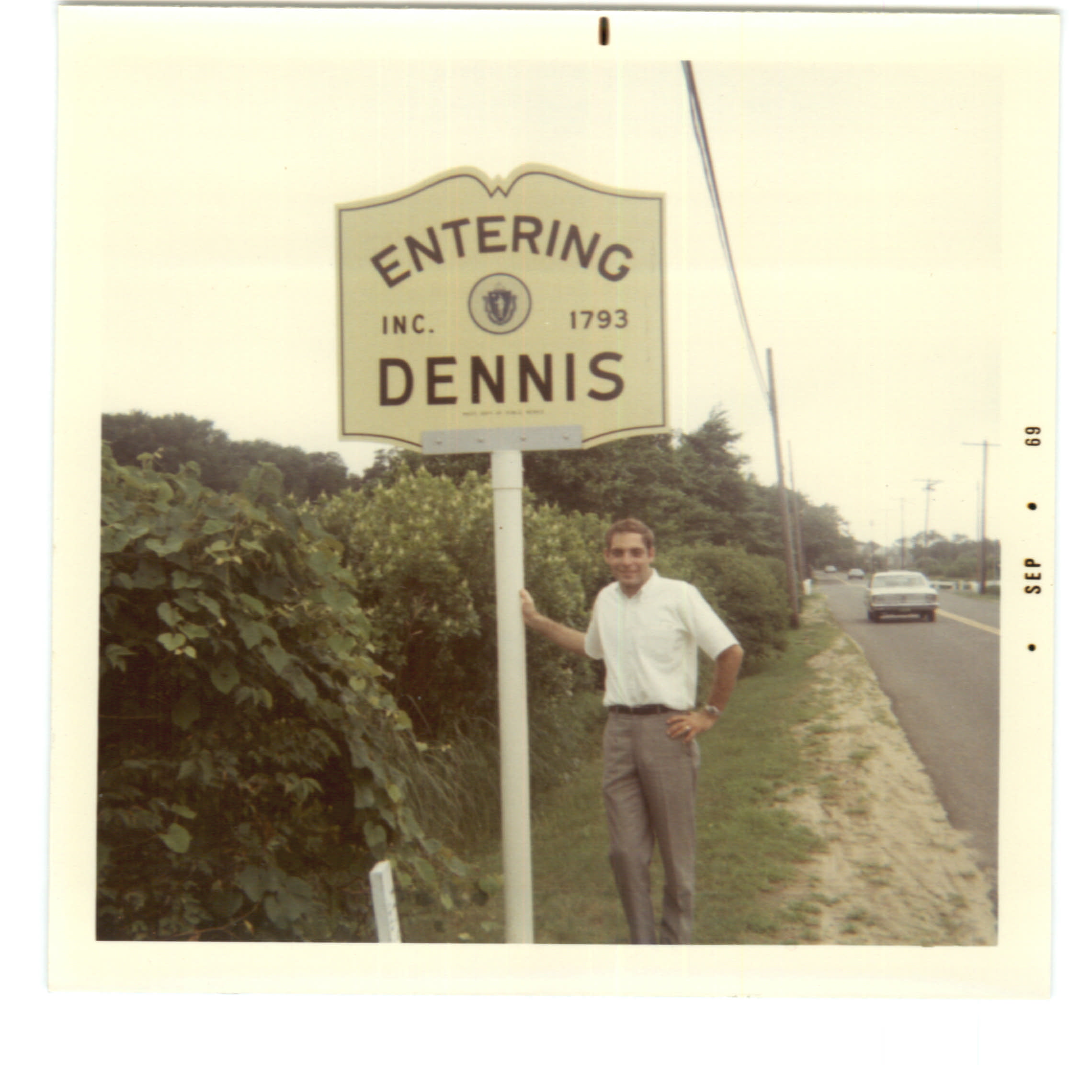
Dennis town border sign in 1969

Chapin Memorial Beach, which was previously known as Black Flats for its black sands and extensive tidal flats, was named in honor of George H. Chapin, who was a real estate developer that donated the land to the Town after World War II. Chase Garden Creek empties into Cape Cod Bay at Chapin Beach and serves as a boundary between Dennis and Yarmouth. It was named for the Chase family, settlers who were on the Cape around 1638.

The area leading to Chapin Beach has alternatively been known as Little Italy and Little Taunton for the Italian immigrants who came by way of Taunton, Massachusetts in the late 1800s to build the railroad on Cape Cod. Many streets in the area, such as Squadrilli Way, Dr. Botero Road, Spadoni Road, and Angelo Road, as well as Lombardi Heights, were named for Italians. The area known as New Boston, including a road and a river, was named for a group of Bostonians who settled in the area.

Corporation Beach, which is also sometimes called Nobscussett Beach, was named for the Nobscussett Point Pier Corporation. It is located on the east side of Nobscussett Point. There was once an Indian village at Nobscussett Point and Harbor, which is also called the Bite, a misspelling of bight. Nobscussett is possibly related to the Algonquian word 'wanashqu', which means at the end of the rock.

Mayflower Beach, named after the failed Mayflower Beach Condominiums Complex, was acquired by the Town in 1977 by eminent domain. At the other end of Mayflower Beach is Bayview Beach. Hippogriffe Road was named after a 678-ton clipper ship built in 1852 at the Shiverick Yards.

=== Dennis Port ===
Dennis Port was named by Thomas Howes, the village's first postmaster, in 1850. Previously, it had been known as Crooks Neck, after Samuel Crook, an Indian who sold the land to English settlers in the 17th century. The name changed to Crookers Neck before becoming Dennis Port.

Glendon Road, and the beach named after the street, took their name from Hubert Glendon, a Marine officer who served as the Columbia University rowing coach after World War II, and who donated the beach to the village. To the west is Peter Hagis Beach, which is located on land donated by his widow. Also in the village is Inman Road Beach, named for the Inman family (including Isaiah Inman) who lived on the corner of Lower County Road. Raycroft Beach was named after Louis B. Raycroft, who often summered near Old Wharf Road and Sea Street.

The Plashes, a term which means "a small collection of standing water," is a conservation area with several small ponds and creeks that connect them. On the Harwich line is White Pond, which is named because of the way the light hits the water. It was formerly known as Aunt Lizzie Robbins Pond, named after a member of the Robbins family of Harwich, who arrived on the Cape in the early 1700s. Swan Pond took its name from the Algonquin word sowan, meaning south. It is also known as Jamies Pond, after James Chase.

Depot Street was named for the train station that once existed in the village. Searsville Road was named in honor of the Sears family, which was once prominent in East Dennis.

=== East Dennis ===
Cold Storage Road, and the beach of the same name, were named after the fish storehouses in the area in the early 1900s. Off of Cold Storage Road is Saltworks Road, named after the salt works built in the 1700s by Captain John Sears. Dennis was once the Cape's leader in making salt, but the works closed in 1888 after salt mines in New York were opened. East Dennis was once known as Searsville, for the Sears family.

On the border with Brewster is Quivet Creek, which was once called Bound Brook. The Indians of the area called it Shuckquan, possibly from a word which means "spring fish." The creek runs next to Crowe's Pasture. It was once known as Indian Land as Crowe was a common name for families with white and Indian spouses. It is, along with Chapin Beach, one of two beaches in the town on which vehicles are allowed.

Sesuit Creek runs into Sesuit Harbor, with Sesuit Neck to the west, before emptying into Cape Cod Bay. In the 1800s, Asa Shiverick and his three sons built schooners, brigs, and clipper ships in the harbor. Two of the Clippers weighed more than 1,000 tons. A plaque honoring the shipyard, which closed in the 1860s, was placed in 1924. Shiverick Road near the harbor honors the family. Wild Hunter Road is named after the Shiverick-built clipper, Wild Hunter, which sailed as far as China.

=== South Dennis ===
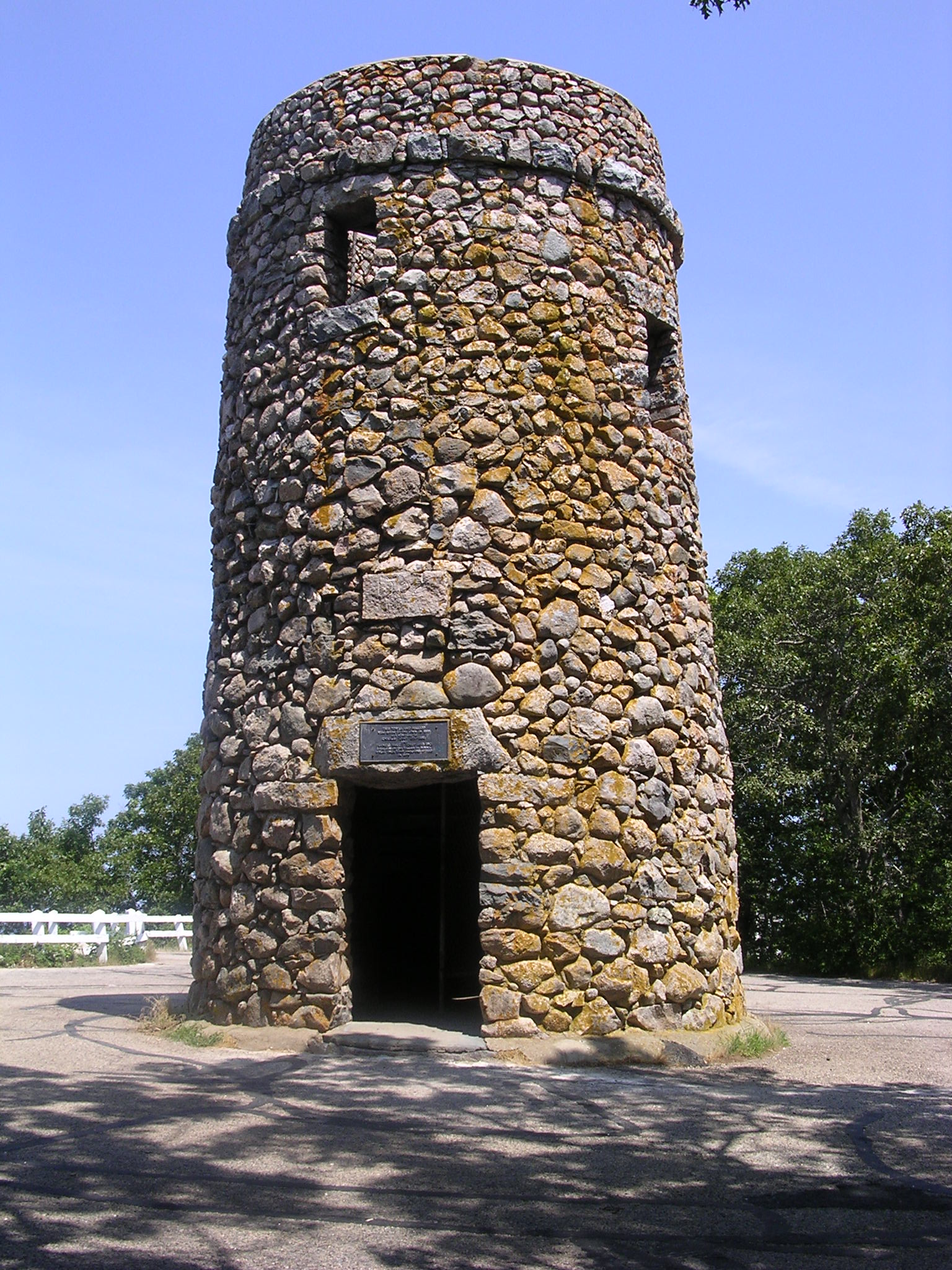
West side exterior of Scargo Tower

The area of Scargo Lake and Scargo Hill in Dennis are associated with ancient Native American folklore. When viewed from Scargo Tower atop the hill, Scargo Lake appears to have the shape of a fish. The lake is a glacial kettle pond and the hills on the northern side of the town are moraines, formed from gravel and debris left by the glacier.

There are several legends about the creation of the lake. One says that an Indian named Maushop dug out the pond, and then lit his pipe. The smoke from the pipe attracted dark clouds, from which rain fell and filled the pond. More common is the story of a princess who was given three fish in a pumpkin by a young brave going off to war. He was gone so long that the fish began to outgrow the pumpkin. The princess had the women of the village dig the pond so the fish could survive, and the dirt the women dug out became Scargo Hill. Today it is the highest hill in the mid-Cape area. A stone tower commemorating Thomas Tobey, who settled in Dennis in 1678, was built in 1902. The Tobey family gave the tower to the Town in 1929.

Airline Road was so named because much of it runs in a straight line between Routes 134 and 6A. Nearby side streets also have aeronautical names, including Propeller Lane, Pilot Drive, Wing Lane, and Jet Drive. A series of streets off Kelly's Bay, just north of the Mid-Cape Highway, received their name for the supposed visit of Vikings to Cape Cod. Norseman, Lief Ericson, Thorwald, Freydis, Viking, and Vinland Drives are all named for the seafaring Scandinavians. Kelly's Bay took its name from David O'Kelia, who came to Cape Cod from his native Northern Ireland in the late 1600s. It is part of the Bass River. Prince Street is named for Thomas Prence who, as the governor of Plymouth Colony, lived on Cape Cod.

Upstream from Kelly's Bay is Follins Pond. Quaker Road, which runs to the pond, is named for the Quakers who built a meetinghouse there. Highbank Road crosses the Bass River into Yarmouth, where the riverbanks are tall. It was once known as the upper bridge, with the lower bridge in West Dennis. Near Wilbur Cove on the river is the Wilbur Preserve, named for Dr. George B. Wilbur, who gave the land to the Town in the 1970s.

Hokum Rock Road, where a drive-in movie theater once stood, is named after a cluster of stones named Hokum Rock. The name may come from the Indian word for "back bend," hockanum, referring to the largest of the rocks which is hooked. The access road leading to the town dump, Theophilus F. Smith Road, was named for the long-time superintendent of the dump.

Flax Pond was named because early residents would soak bundles of flax in the pond until the pulp would separate and could be used to spin linen. Just south at the head of the Bass River is Follins Pond, named for the 17th-century settler Thomas Follins. The "fun" in Funn Pond, at the Dennis Pines golf course, is a shortened version of Funnell, or charcoal burner.

=== West Dennis ===
Part of West Dennis is known as Baker Town, for the Baker family that once resided on and around Main Street in South and West Dennis. The Bakers sent 29 captains to sea, and the Ezra Baker School and the Baker Park in West Dennis are named after family members. Peter Petlz's poem describes the influence the family had in the area:

The English were prolific,

On Cape Cod's Sandy shores,

And if you don't believe it,

Look at all the Bakers.

Aunt Julia Ann Road, and a beach with the same name, are found on the Bass River, across from the Bass River Golf Club. They are named after Julia Ann Baker, the third wife and widow of Levi Baker. After he died, she kept a supply store for fishermen, Levi's Chandlery. Near the beach, on Grand Cove, is Crowell Village. It was named for the Crowell or Crowe family. Henry David Thoreau passed over a toll bridge here during one of his trips to the Cape. The area was once known as Crowe Town and Crowe's Neck. Also on the neck is Horsefoot Road, and next to that is Horse foot Cove. Horse foot refers to a horseshoe crab.

West Dennis Beach was once known as Davis Beach, and the road that runs along the length of the beach is called Davis Beach Road. Charles Henry Davis sold the beach to the Town in the early 1900s. At the east end of the beach, on Lighthouse Road, is the Lighthouse Inn where a lighthouse was built in 1855 and was in service until 1914. Recently, the West Dennis Light has been restored as an aid to navigation and operates during the summer months.

Kelly's Pond was probably named after David and Elihu Kelly, who lived nearby in the early 1800s. The area between Kelly's Pond and the Bass River is known as Wrinkle Point. Wrinkle is another word for periwinkle. Uncle Barney's Road, which runs up Wrinkle Point parallel to the Bass River, was named after Barnabas Baker, who had a salt works in the area in the 1800s.

The area between Weir Creek and Swan River was once known as Battletown and Lower County Road was called Battle town Road. It was said by a late 1800s resident of the road, Anthony Gage, that "Men used to raise sons to sender down her to fight."

South Village was a fishing hamlet in West Dennis during its early days. The name is memorialized by South Village Road, Lane, Circle, Drive, and Beach. At one end of South Village Road is Trotting Park Road, which took its name from the popular race track that was off the street in the late 1800s. At the northern end of the road is a house named Jericho. It was built by Captain Theophilus Baker in 1801 and was purchased in the 20th century by Virginia Gildersleeve and Elizabeth Reynard. They gave the house its present name because its walls were about to come "tumbling down". Repairs were made and the house was given to the town in 1962.

== Climate ==
According to the Köppen climate classification system, Dennis, Massachusetts has a warm-summer, wet year-round, humid continental climate (Dfb). Dfb climates are characterized by at least one month having an average mean temperature ≤ 32.0 °F (≤ 0.0 °C), at least four months with an average mean temperature ≥ 50.0 °F (≥ 10.0 °C), all months with an average mean temperature ≤ 71.6 °F (≤ 22.0 °C), and no significant precipitation difference between seasons. The average seasonal (Nov-Apr) snowfall total is approximately 30 inches (76 cm). The average snowiest month is February, which corresponds with the annual peak in nor'easter activity. The plant hardiness zone is 7a, with an average annual extreme minimum air temperature of 2.0 °F (–16.7 °C).

Climate data for Dennis, Barnstable County, Massachusetts (1981–2010 averages)
Month	Jan	Feb	Mar	Apr	May	Jun	Jul	Aug	Sep	Oct	Nov	Dec	Year
Mean daily maximum °F (°C)	37.8 (3.2)	39.3 (4.1)	44.5 (6.9)	52.7 (11.5)	62.2 (16.8)	71.5 (21.9)	77.8 (25.4)	77.0 (25.0)	70.8 (21.6)	61.1 (16.2)	52.8 (11.6)	43.3 (6.3)	57.7 (14.3)
Daily mean °F (°C)	30.5 (−0.8)	31.9 (−0.1)	37.2 (2.9)	45.4 (7.4)	54.7 (12.6)	64.3 (17.9)	70.6 (21.4)	70.0 (21.1)	63.4 (17.4)	53.6 (12.0)	45.5 (7.5)	36.1 (2.3)	50.4 (10.2)
Mean daily minimum °F (°C)	23.3 (−4.8)	24.6 (−4.1)	30.0 (−1.1)	38.2 (3.4)	47.2 (8.4)	57.1 (13.9)	63.5 (17.5)	63.1 (17.3)	56.1 (13.4)	46.1 (7.8)	38.2 (3.4)	28.9 (−1.7)	43.1 (6.2)
Average precipitation inches (mm)	3.71 (94)	3.31 (84)	4.55 (116)	4.29 (109)	3.37 (86)	3.52 (89)	3.13 (80)	3.46 (88)	3.67 (93)	3.99 (101)	4.08 (104)	4.09 (104)	45.17 (1,147)
Average relative humidity (%)	70.4	69.3	67.7	70.6	73.0	76.1	78.3	78.5	77.9	74.5	71.2	70.4	73.2
Average dew point °F (°C)	22.0 (−5.6)	23.0 (−5.0)	27.5 (−2.5)	36.4 (2.4)	46.2 (7.9)	56.6 (13.7)	63.5 (17.5)	63.0 (17.2)	56.4 (13.6)	45.7 (7.6)	36.7 (2.6)	27.4 (−2.6)	42.1 (5.6)
Source: PRISM Climate Group

== Ecology ==
According to the A. W. Kuchler U.S. Potential natural vegetation Types, Dennis, Massachusetts would primarily contain a Northeastern Oak/Pine (110) vegetation type with a Southern Mixed Forest (26) vegetation form.

== Demographics ==
Historical population
Year	Pop.	±%
1850	3,257	—
1860	3,662	+12.4%
1870	3,269	−10.7%
1880	3,288	+0.6%
1890	2,899	−11.8%
1900	2,333	−19.5%
1910	1,919	−17.7%
1920	1,536	−20.0%
1930	1,829	+19.1%
1940	2,015	+10.2%
1950	2,499	+24.0%
1960	3,727	+49.1%
1970	6,454	+73.2%
1980	12,360	+91.5%
1990	13,864	+12.2%
2000	15,973	+15.2%
2010	14,207	−11.1%
2020	14,674	+3.3%
2023*	14,903	+1.6%
* = population estimate. Source: United States census records and Population Estimates Program data.

As of the census in 2000, there were 15,973 people, 7,504 households, and 4,577 families residing in the town. The census measures the year-round population; in the summer the population is estimated to be 63,000. The census population density was 775.6 inhabitants per square mile (299.5/km^{2}). There were 14,105 housing units at an average density of 684.9 per square mile (264.4/km^{2}). The racial makeup of the town was 94.99% White, 1.93% Black or African American, 0.37% Native American, 0.37% Asian, 0.88% from other races, and 1.46% from two or more races. Hispanic or Latino of any race were 1.65% of the population.

There were 7,504 households, out of which 18.8% had children under the age of 18 living with them, 49.0% were married couples living together, 9.2% had a female householder with no husband present, and 39.0% were non-families. 33.3% of all households were made up of individuals, and 17.7% had someone living alone who was 65 years of age or older. The average household size was 2.11 and the average family size was 2.65 persons.

In the town, the population was diversely aged, with 16.9% under the age of 18, 4.6% aged 18 to 24, 22.2% from 25 to 44, 27.8% from 45 to 64, and 28.4% who were 65 years of age or older. The median age was 49 years. For every 100 females, there were 85.6 males. For every 100 females age 18 and over, there were 82.7 males. The median income for a household in the town was $41,598, and the median income for a family was $50,478. Males had a median income of $40,528, versus $29,153 for females. The per capita income for the town was $25,428. About 5.4% of families and 7.0% of the population were below the poverty line, including 10.4% of those under age 18 and 4.8% of those age 65 or over.

== Beaches ==
All the public beaches in Dennis are owned by the town. The Northside beaches are located on Cape Cod Bay, while the Southside beaches are located on Nantucket Sound. Some of them have different names for different entrances. On the Northside, Corporation Beach and Howes Street Beach are on the same strip of public beach. The same goes for Mayflower Beach and Bayview* Beach, Cold Storage* Beach, and Sea Street Beach. Chapin Beach and Harborview* Beach are not paired with any other. On the Northside, the town also owns two beaches on Scargo Lake: Scargo Beach and Princess Beach.

The Southside beaches are Glendon Beach, Haigis Beach, Inman Road Beach, Raycroft Beach, Metcalfe Memorial Beach, West Dennis Beach, South Village Beach, and Sea Street Beach.

All of the public beaches in Dennis are free to walk on. However, every beach (except those with a *) charges a non-resident parking fee of $20 per day during the week, $25 per day on the weekend, or $75 per week. Residents (Dennis taxpayers) can buy beach parking stickers with proof of residency for $40 for the season. At resident-only beaches (marked with a *), non-residents may not park at all.

Mayflower Beach faces Cape Cod Bay and is named after the Pilgrims' ship, the Mayflower.

== Sports and recreation ==
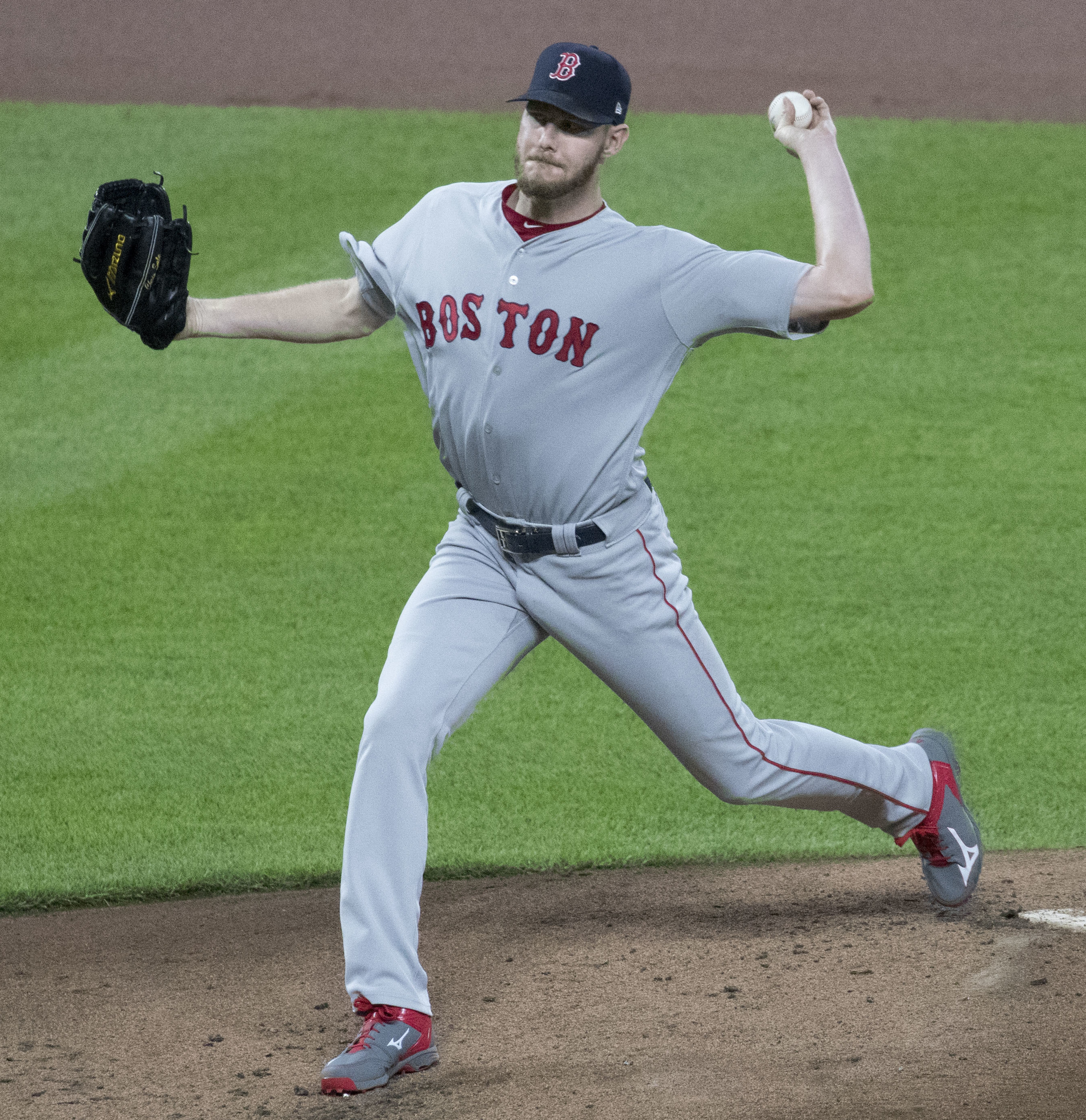
Chris Sale played for the Yarmouth–Dennis Red Sox in 2009.

With neighboring Yarmouth, Dennis is home to the Yarmouth–Dennis Red Sox, an amateur collegiate summer baseball team in the Cape Cod Baseball League. The team plays at Red Wilson Field and has featured dozens of players who went on to careers in Major League Baseball such as Craig Biggio, Buster Posey, and Chris Sale.

In addition to the beaches, there are several key recreation areas in the town. Johnny Kelley Recreation area in South Dennis provides a hiking/jogging trail, an exercise trail, a Braille trail, playing courts and fields, a playground, and a picnic area. The Nobscussett Conservation Area (usually called "Indian Lands") provides hiking trails and views along the protected shores of Bass River, where the Nobscussett spent their winters. Crowe's Pasture on the north side of the town provides many acres of open land and hiking with water views. Bass River Park in West Dennis offers fine views of Bass River and the boating activity there. Popular children's playgrounds are found at the Baker School in West Dennis, at the West Dennis Community Building, and the village green in Dennis Port.

== Transportation ==
Dennis is crossed from east to west by Cape Cod's three main routes; U.S. Route 6, Massachusetts Route 6A and Massachusetts Route 28. Massachusetts Route 134 crosses the town south to north from Route 28 to Route 6A. East of the Route 134 exit, Route 6 (also known as the Mid-Cape Highway) downgrades from a four-lane divided highway to a two-lane limited access highway, divided only by markers.

Before 2018, the Cape's Bay Colony Rail service officially ended in the town just west of Route 134. Although the right of way for this line probably existed, there has long been no railroad bridge over Bass River and therefore no trains have entered the town of Dennis for decades. In approximately 2018, this railway was removed, which allowed for the expansion of the Cape Cod Rail Trail. Construction of the extension included a pedestrian bridge over Bass River, which connected the trail to Yarmouth. The Cape Cod Rail Trail is a paved bicycle trail that runs "down" the Cape to Wellfleet along the former right-of-way of the railway. There are also several other bicycle trails in town. The nearest regional air service is at the Barnstable Municipal Airport, and the nearest national and international air service is at Logan International Airport in Boston.

== Government ==
The town of Dennis is governed by an open town meeting form of government and is led by a board of selectmen, which delegates day-to-day operations to a town administrator. The town has a police department, and the fire department is headquartered near the intersection of Routes 28 and 134 with a branch station off of Route 6A. There are libraries in each of the five villages. The central library is located in Dennis Port, and all are a part of the Cape Libraries Automated Materials Sharing library network. The town operates its own landfill, located southeast of the junction of Routes 6 and 134.

Dennis is represented in the Massachusetts House of Representatives in the First Barnstable District. The town is represented in the Massachusetts Senate as a part of the Cape and Islands District, which includes all of Cape Cod (except the towns of Bourne, Falmouth, and Sandwich), and the islands of Martha's Vineyard and Nantucket. The town is patrolled by the Second (Yarmouth) Barracks of Troop D of the Massachusetts State Police.

Dennis is in the Massachusetts 9th congressional district and represented by William Keating. The state's senior (Class II) member of the United States Senate, elected in 2012, is Elizabeth Warren. The junior (Class I) senator, elected in 2013, is Ed Markey.

Dennis presidential election results
Year	Democratic	Republican	Third parties	Total Votes	Difference
2024	56.33% 5,809	40.49% 4,178	3.19% 329	10,316	15.81%
2020	59.89% 6,181	38.16% 3,938	1.96% 202	10,321	21.73%
2016	53.42% 4,887	41.00% 3,751	5.57% 510	9,148	12.42%
2012	53.04% 4,921	45.77% 4,247	1.19% 110	9,278	7.26%
2008	55.13% 5,209	43.37% 4,098	1.49% 141	9,448	11.76%
2004	54.24% 5,246	44.72% 4,325	1.04% 101	9,672	9.52%
2000	51.45% 4,625	41.55% 3,735	7.01% 630	8,990	9.90%
1996	52.47% 4,353	38.21% 3,170	9.32% 773	8,296	14.26%
1992	41.49% 3,476	33.60% 2,815	24.91% 2,087	8,378	7.89%
1988	46.06% 3,699	52.17% 4,189	1.77% 142	8,030	6.10%
1980	26.16% 1,928	53.26% 3,926	20.58% 1,517	7,371	27.11%
1976	40.58% 2,640	56.56% 3,680	2.86% 186	6,506	15.99%
1972	34.21% 1,736	65.48% 3,323	0.32% 16	5,075	31.27%
1968	33.94% 1,138	63.14% 2,117	2.92% 98	3,353	29.20%
1964	49.94% 1,315	49.87% 1,313	0.19% 5	2,633	0.08%
1960	27.02% 651	72.69% 1,751	0.29% 7	2,409	45.66%
1956	12.03% 237	87.97% 1,733	0.00% 0	1,970	75.94%
1952	13.42% 238	86.58% 1,535	0.00% 0	1,773	73.15%
1948	14.00% 181	85.07% 1,100	0.93% 12	1,293	71.08%
1944	18.09% 184	81.71% 831	0.20% 2	1,017	63.62%
1940	19.16% 218	80.49% 916	0.35% 4	1,138	61.34%

== Education ==
Dennis shares its school system with Yarmouth to form the Dennis-Yarmouth Regional School District. The town itself operates the Ezra H. Baker School, which serves students from pre-kindergarten through third grade. Students in grades 4 through 7 attend Dennis-Yarmouth Intermediate/Middle School. High school students and 8th graders attend Dennis-Yarmouth Regional High School in Yarmouth. Students are not officially contracted to any vocational high schools; private schools can be found in each of the neighboring towns.

== Notable people ==
- Mary Higgins Clark (1927–2020), author
- Edward Gelsthorpe (1921–2009), marketing executive called "Cranapple Ed" for his best-known product launch
- Amy Jo Johnson, actress
- Samantha Johnson, musician and ring announcer, also known as "Samantha Irvin"
- Gertrude Lawrence (1898–1952), actress
- John Sears (1744–1817), Sleepy John Sears, founder of the local salt industry
- Mike Sherman, former coach of the Green Bay Packers and of the Texas A&M Aggies
- Richard Valle (1931–1995), founder of Valle's Steak House restaurant chain
- Mark Shields (1937-2022), American political commentator and longtime summer resident
