= John Sears (salt producer) =

Founder of the salt industry in Cape Cod, Massachusetts

John Sears (1744 – 1817) (colloquially known as Sleepy John Sears) was a salt producer in Massachusetts Bay Colony.

He was born in Yarmouth on the neck of Cape Cod and spent most of his life as a sea captain. He was known as Sleepy John because of his habit of falling asleep during the day.

In the years leading up to the Revolutionary War the colonists were concerned about the loss of salt imports from overseas which were vital for the preservation of meat and fish. The Continental Congress declared a bounty of one third of a dollar for each bushel (56 pounds weight) produced, but it was soon discovered that boiling down seawater to produce it was highly uneconomic.

John Sears adopted a different solution based on the evaporation of seawater in large wooden vats, which he constructed near his Cape Cod home in Dennis, Massachusetts. The process was inefficient and unrewarding at first, but he improved it by making the vats leakproof, providing moveable covers to keep out the rain and installing a salvaged bilge pump to draw water directly from the sea via leadlined wooden pipes. He profited considerably both from his production improvements and from the increase in the price of salt from 50 cents a bushel to $8 by the time the war finished in 1783. In 1785 he built a windmill to pump the water automatically from the sea.

He died in 1817 a relatively rich man and was buried in nearby West Brewster. His epitaph is inscribed “John Sears, Inventor of the Salt Works, Aged 72 y’rs". He had married his wife Phebe Sears on 26 Dec 1771 in Yarmouth and had 9 children.

By the time of his death many other local people had followed him into vat based salt production and by 1837 there were in excess of 650 saltworks on Cape Cod alone, an industry that prospered until cheaper alternative sources became available in the 1800s. He is nowadays jointly commemorated, together with John Winthrop, Jnr, by the annual award from the Chemists' Club and Chemical Heritage Foundation of the Winthrop-Sears Medal, which recognizes entrepreneurial achievement in the chemical field.
