= Bass River (Massachusetts) =

Estuary and village in Massachusetts, US

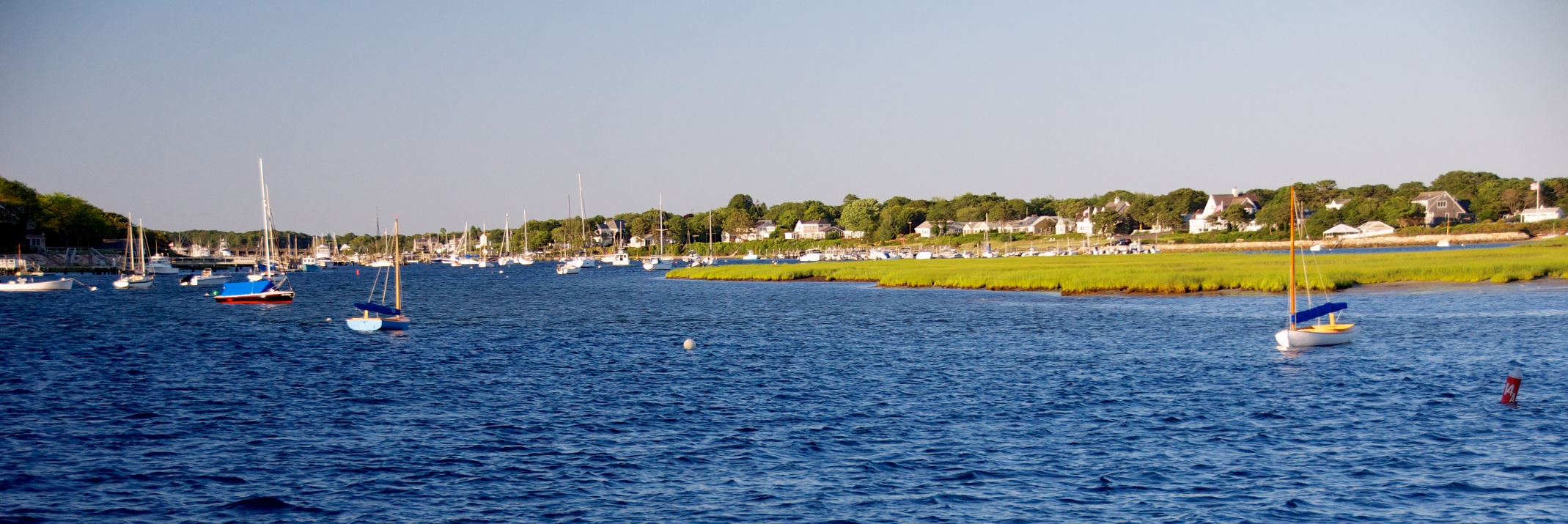
- Looking up Bass River

Location
- Country: United States
- State: Massachusetts

Physical characteristics
- Source: Mill Pond
  - location: NW of South Yarmouth
  - coordinates: 41°42′19″N 70°11′40″W
- Mouth: Nantucket Sound
  - location: S of South Yarmouth
  - coordinates: 41°38′46″N 70°11′48″W
  - elevation: 0 ft (0 m)

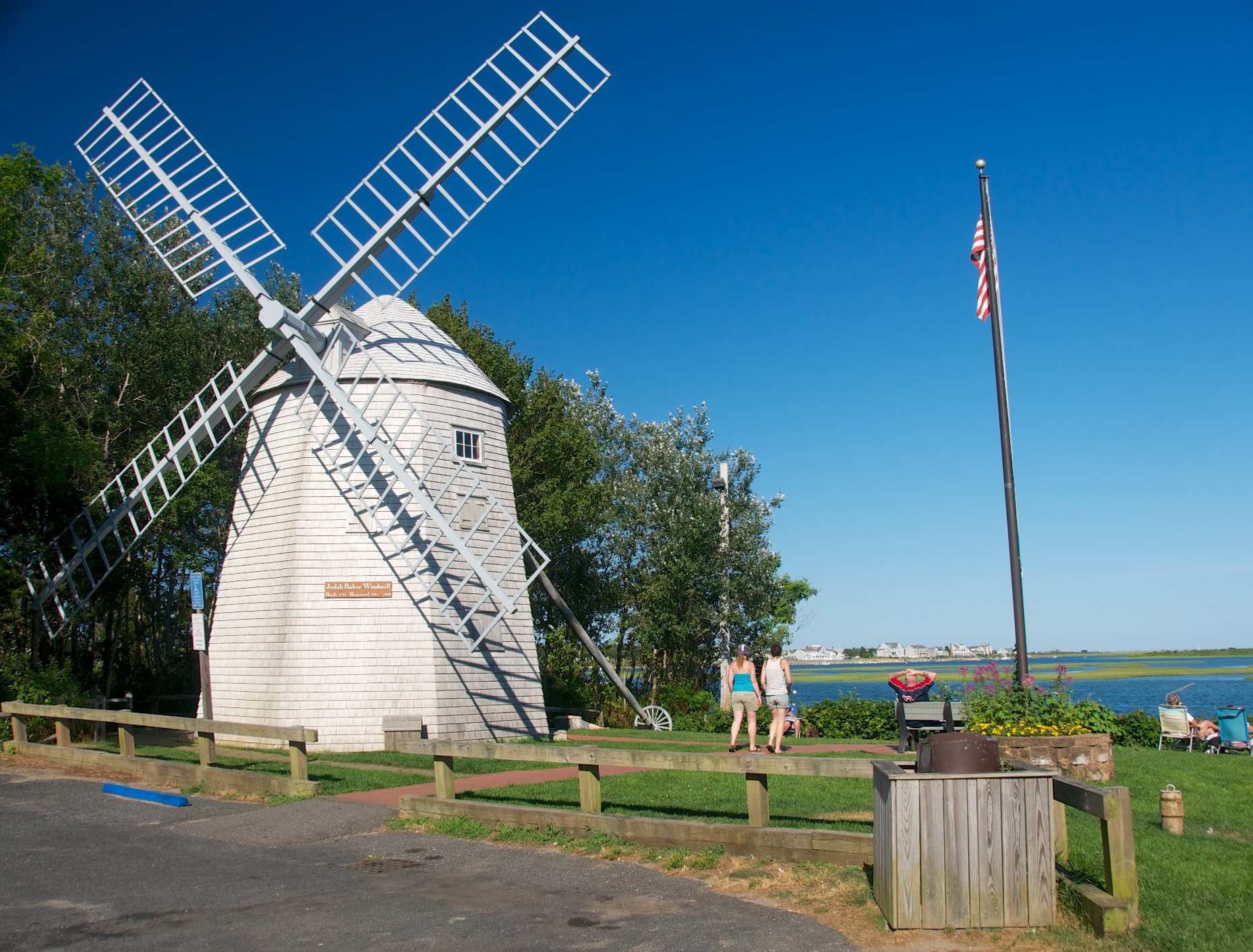
Windmill Beach in South Yarmouth

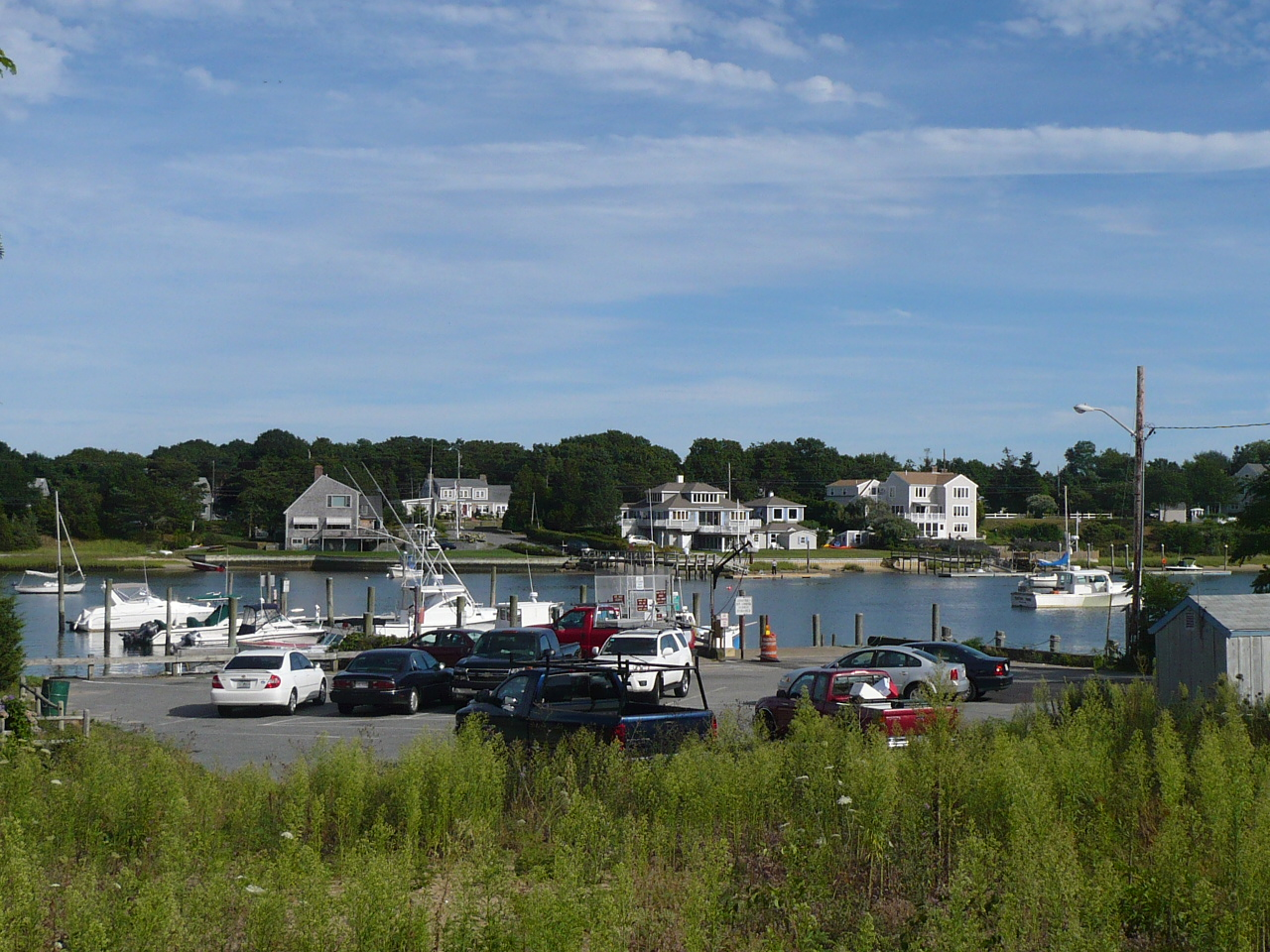
Dennis on the bank of Bass River

Bass River is an estuary and village in South Yarmouth, Massachusetts, United States. The estuary separates the towns of Yarmouth and Dennis at the central, southern sections of the towns. At its widest and most southerly point, it opens to and meets Nantucket Sound. Its brackish, northwestern end flows into Follins Pond, from there winding further north as a brook, to Mill Pond then an underground stream that nearly bisects Cape Cod.

The mouth of the river is between Smugglers Beach on the Yarmouth side and West Dennis Beach on the Dennis side. West Dennis beach has become a popular site for kite boarding in the past few years. In the same way, Kalmus Beach in Hyannis has become popular for windsurfing. Once inside the river, there is a large land mass covered with sea grass, in the middle of which is a large bay. The island is called 'Marsh Island' by the locals.

Marsh Island separates Bass River into two parts. The right side of the river, which is referred to as the 'Old Field Channel', goes towards West Dennis and the Fingers development. The left side is the main channel of the river, passing Windmill Beach, Bass River Yacht Club, Ship Shops Marina and the prestigious Bass River Marina and Yacht Club. After the marina, the river goes under the Route 28 bridge and winds five more miles deep into the cape. Bass River was once considered a viable location for a canal traversing Cape Cod, and is the largest river the Mid-Cape Highway spans.

Bass River is home to a friendly rivalry between West Dennis Yacht Club and the Bass River Yacht Club. These clubs also compete against Hyannis Yacht Club, Wianno Yacht Club, and others in the Southern Massachusetts Sailing Association team racing circuit. The Yarmouth shores are home to Bass River Golf Course, which is owned and operated by the town of Yarmouth.
