= West Dennis, Massachusetts =

- Census-designated place
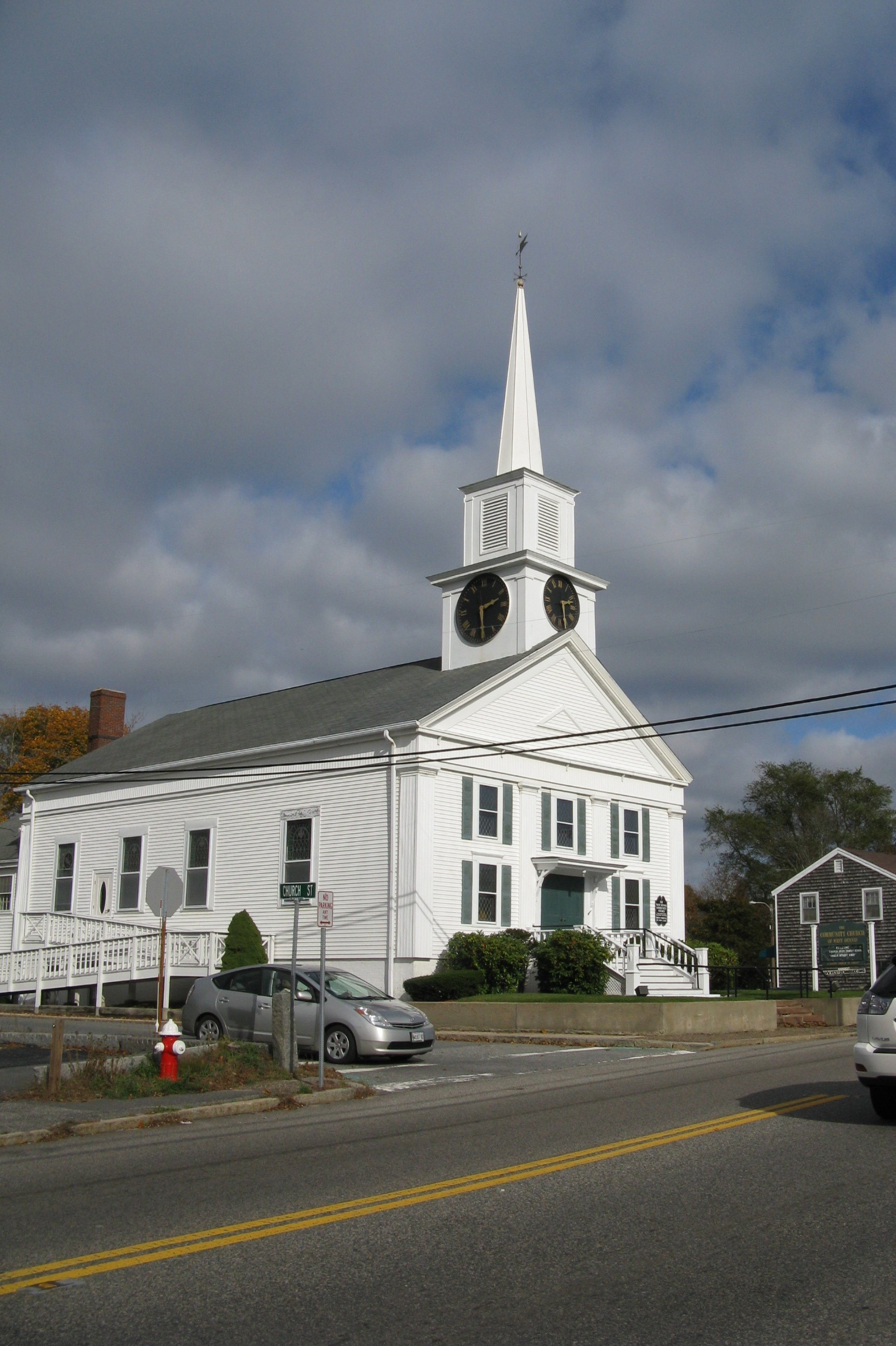
- West Dennis Community Church

- Location in Barnstable County and the state of Massachusetts.
- Coordinates: 41°39′42″N 70°9′43″W
- Country: United States
- State: Massachusetts
- County: Barnstable
- Town: Dennis

Area
  - Total: 4.21 sq mi (10.90 km^{2})
  - Land: 3.26 sq mi (8.45 km^{2})
  - Water: 0.95 sq mi (2.46 km^{2})
- Elevation: 9.8 ft (3 m)

Population (2020)
  - Total: 2,304
  - Density: 706.5/sq mi (272.77/km^{2})
- Time zone: UTC-5 (Eastern (EST))
  - Summer (DST): UTC-4 (EDT)
- ZIP Codes: 02670 (West Dennis); 02660 (South Dennis)
- Area code: 508
- FIPS code: 25-75820
- GNIS feature ID: 0615889

West Dennis is a census-designated place (CDP) in the town of Dennis in Barnstable County, Massachusetts, United States. As of the 2020 census, West Dennis had a population of 2,304.

== Geography ==
West Dennis is located in the southwestern corner of the town of Dennis at 41°39′42″N 70°9′43″W (41.661753, -70.161975). It is bordered to the north by the CDP of South Dennis, to the east by Dennis Port, to the south by Nantucket Sound, and to the west by South Yarmouth.

According to the United States Census Bureau, the West Dennis CDP has a total area of 4.2 square miles (10.9 km^{2}), of which 3.3 square miles (8.5 km^{2}) is land and 0.97 square miles (2.5 km^{2}) (22.50%) is water.

== Education ==
The Ezra H. Baker Elementary School, named for Ezra Henry Baker, is located in West Dennis.

== Demographics ==
Historical population
Census	Pop.	Note	%±
2020	2,304		—
U.S. Decennial Census

=== 2020 census ===
As of the 2020 census, West Dennis had a population of 2,304. The median age was 61.1 years. 8.6% of residents were under the age of 18 and 41.7% of residents were 65 years of age or older. For every 100 females there were 89.6 males, and for every 100 females age 18 and over there were 89.8 males age 18 and over.

100.0% of residents lived in urban areas, while 0.0% lived in rural areas.

There were 1,258 households in West Dennis, of which 10.1% had children under the age of 18 living in them. Of all households, 35.8% were married-couple households, 22.7% were households with a male householder and no spouse or partner present, and 34.4% were households with a female householder and no spouse or partner present. About 44.2% of all households were made up of individuals and 25.4% had someone living alone who was 65 years of age or older.

There were 2,927 housing units, of which 57.0% were vacant. The homeowner vacancy rate was 1.8% and the rental vacancy rate was 10.6%.

Racial composition as of the 2020 census
Race	Number	Percent
White	2,037	88.4%
Black or African American	91	3.9%
American Indian and Alaska Native	4	0.2%
Asian	24	1.0%
Native Hawaiian and Other Pacific Islander	1	0.0%
Some other race	36	1.6%
Two or more races	111	4.8%
Hispanic or Latino (of any race)	64	2.8%

=== 2000 census ===
As of the census of 2000, there were 2,570 people, 1,279 households, and 698 families residing in the CDP. The population density was 301.6/km^{2} (781.3/mi^{2}). There were 2,733 housing units at an average density of 320.7/km^{2} (830.8/mi^{2}). The racial makeup of the CDP was 95.53% White, 2.37% African American, 0.54% Native American, 0.31% Asian, 0.43% from other races, and 0.82% from two or more races. Hispanic or Latino of any race were 0.93% of the population.

There were 1,279 households, out of which 13.0% had children under the age of 18 living with them, 44.0% were married couples living together, 7.3% had a female householder with no husband present, and 45.4% were non-families. 38.5% of all households were made up of individuals, and 20.6% had someone living alone who was 65 years of age or older. The average household size was 1.96 and the average family size was 2.53.

In the CDP, the population was spread out, with 13.0% under the age of 18, 4.6% from 18 to 24, 22.0% from 25 to 44, 28.2% from 45 to 64, and 32.2% who were 65 years of age or older. The median age was 53 years. For every 100 females, there were 83.8 males. For every 100 females age 18 and over, there were 81.7 males.

The median income for a household in the CDP was $35,350, and the median income for a family was $50,156. Males had a median income of $37,266 versus $29,625 for females. The per capita income for the CDP was $26,667. About 7.0% of families and 10.7% of the population were below the poverty line, including 20.6% of those under age 18 and 7.5% of those age 65 or over.

== Notable people ==
- Tom Skeyhill (1895–1932), soldier and lecturer, ghostwrote Sergeant York
