= Dennis (CDP), Massachusetts =

Dennis, Massachusetts
- Census-designated place
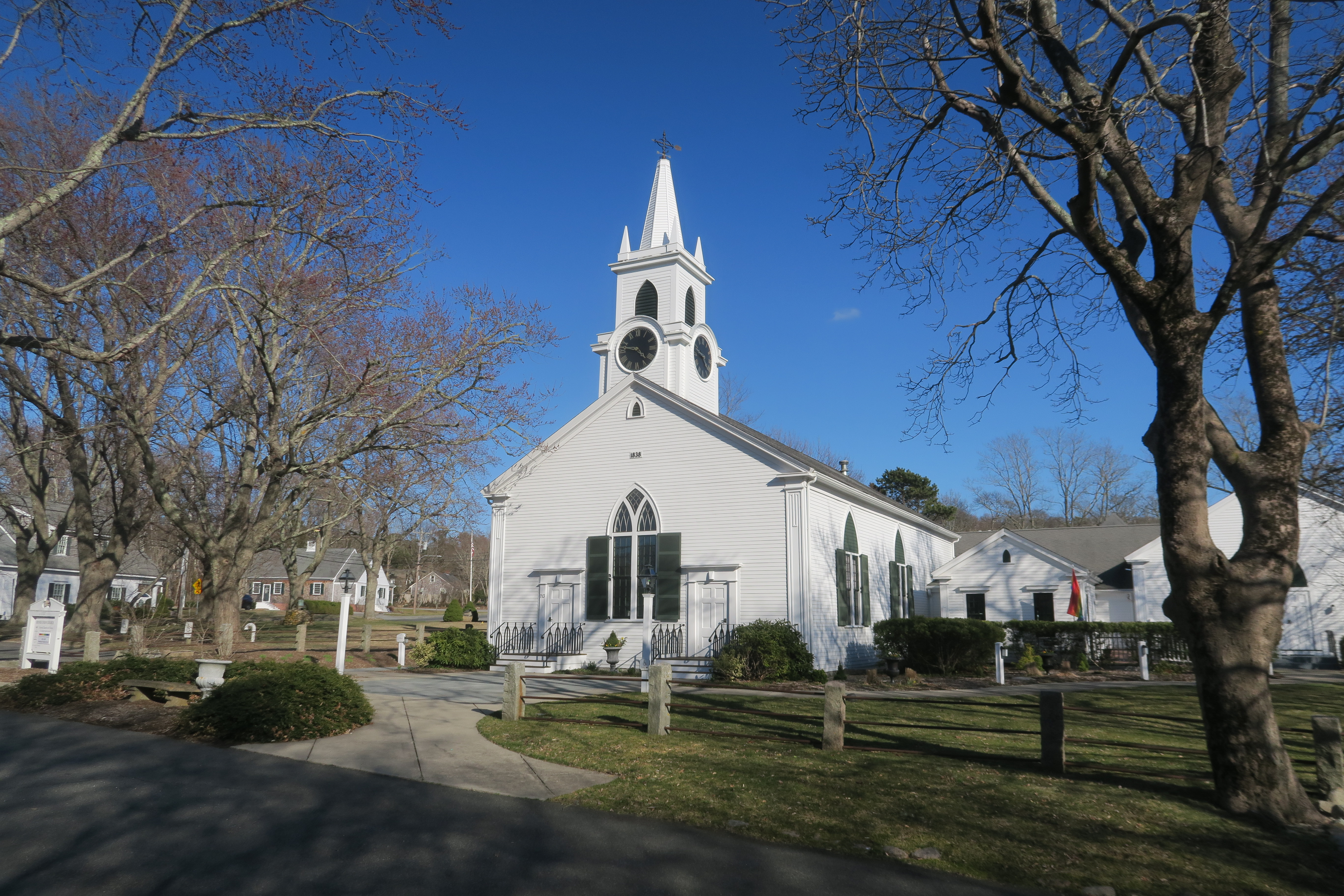
- Dennis Union Church

- Location in Barnstable County and the state of Massachusetts.
- Coordinates: 41°44′7″N 70°11′57″W
- Country: United States
- State: Massachusetts
- County: Barnstable
- Town: Dennis

Area
  - Total: 5.13 sq mi (13.28 km^{2})
  - Land: 4.91 sq mi (12.72 km^{2})
  - Water: 0.22 sq mi (0.56 km^{2})
- Elevation: 16 ft (5 m)

Population (2020)
  - Total: 2,399
  - Density: 488.5/sq mi (188.61/km^{2})
- Time zone: UTC-5 (Eastern (EST))
  - Summer (DST): UTC-4 (EDT)
- ZIP code: 02638
- Area code: 508
- FIPS code: 25-16740
- GNIS feature ID: 0615824

Dennis is a village and census-designated place (CDP) in the town of Dennis in Barnstable County, Massachusetts, United States. The population was 2,407 at the 2010 census. The CDP includes the populated places known as North Dennis and New Boston.

The Dennis post office, one of five post offices in the town of Dennis, is assigned zip code 02638.

== Geography ==
Dennis is located near Cape Cod Bay in the northern portion of the town of Dennis, at 41°44′6″N 70°11′57″W (41.73526, -70.199199).

According to the United States Census Bureau, the CDP has a total area of 5.1 square miles (13.2 km^{2}), of which 4.9 square miles (12.6 km^{2}) is land and 0.19 square miles (0.5 km^{2}), or 4.05%, is water.

== Demographics ==
Historical population
Census	Pop.	Note	%±
2020	2,399		—
U.S. Decennial Census

As of the census of 2000, there were 2,798 people, 1,303 households, and 845 families residing in the CDP. The population density was 220.5 people/km^{2} (571 people/mi^{2}). There were 2,322 housing units at an average density of 183.0 units/km^{2} (474 units/mi^{2}). The racial makeup of the CDP was 97.86% White, 0.25% Black or African American, 0.11% Native American, 0.46% Asian, 0.32% from other races, and 1.00% from two or more races. Hispanic or Latino of any race were 1.04% of the population.

There were 1,303 households, out of which 18.5% had children under the age of 18 living with them, 55.6% were married couples living together, 7.4% had a female householder with no husband present, and 35.1% were non-families. 30.0% of all households were made up of individuals, and 17.5% had someone living alone who was 65 years of age or older. The average household size was 2.15 and the average family size was 2.63.

In the CDP, the population was spread out, with 16.2% under the age of 18, 4.5% from 18 to 24, 17.5% from 25 to 44, 32.5% from 45 to 64, and 29.2% who were 65 years of age or older. The median age was 52 years. For every 100 females, there were 89.3 males. For every 100 females age 18 and over, there were 86.1 males.

The median income for a household in the CDP was $51,286, and the median income for a family was $60,000. Males had a median income of $45,313 versus $36,167 for females. The per capita income for the CDP was $27,113. About 2.3% of families and 3.4% of the population were below the poverty line, including none of those under age 18 and 5.6% of those age 65 or over.
