= Flax Pond =

Flax Pond may refer to:

- Flax Pond (Bourne, Massachusetts) in Nickerson State Park
- Flax Pond (Brewster, Massachusetts)
- Flax Pond (Lynn, Massachusetts)
- Flax Pond (New York), a tidal estuary located in Old Field, New York
