= Higgins Pond =

Lake of the United States of America

- Location within Massachusetts
- Location: Nickerson State Park; Brewster, Massachusetts
- Coordinates: 41°45′29″N 70°00′34″W
- Type: Kettle pond
- Basin countries: United States
- Surface area: 25 acres (10 ha)
- Average depth: 29 feet (8.8 m)
- Max. depth: 66 feet (20 m)
- Shore length^{1}: 0.9 miles (1.4 km)
- ^{1} Shore length is not a well-defined measure.

Higgins Pond is a 25-acre (100,000 m^{2}) kettle pond in Brewster, Massachusetts. It is located in Nickerson State Park.

The Massachusetts Division of Fisheries and Wildlife stocks the pond in spring with various trout species. Access to the pond is difficult for vehicles, but the pond offers anglers good wading.
