= John Hay (nature writer) =

John Hay (August 31, 1915, Ipswich, Massachusetts – February 26, 2011, Bremen, Maine) was an American author, naturalist, and conservation activist. Hay co-founded the Cape Cod Museum of Natural History in Brewster, Massachusetts and served as its president from 1955 to 1980. He composed 18 books from his "writing shack" on Dry Hill at his home in Brewster, Massachusetts, including two autobiographies, A beginner's faith in things unseen (1995) and Mind the Gap: The Education of a Nature Writer. (2004).

Hay was born in Ipswich, Massachusetts in 1915 and grew up in New York City. His grandfather was the Secretary of State John Milton Hay. He attended Harvard University and served in the army during World War II. During most of his career, he lived in Brewster, Massachusetts and Bremen, Maine, and he worked on conservation in the northeast. In 1955, he helped co-found the Cape Cod Museum of Natural History and served as its president from 1955 to 1980. He later served on the Brewster Conservation Commission, where he worked on conservation of the town's salt marshes.

== Works ==
- The Run. 1959. (about alewife migration)
- Nature's year: The seasons of Cape Cod. 1961.
- A sense of nature. 1962.
- Great house of birds. 1966.
- The great beach. 1963.
- The Atlantic shore: Human and natural history from Long Island to Labrador. 1966.
- In defense of nature. 1969.
- The primal alliance: Earth and ocean. Lines from The Atlantic shore. 1971.
- Spirit of survival: A natural and personal history of terns. 1974.
- The undiscovered country. 1981.
- The immortal wilderness. 1987.
- The bird of light. 1991. (about terns)
- A beginner's faith in things unseen. Boston: Beacon Press, 1995.
- The way to the salt marsh: A John Hay reader. 1998.
- In the company of light. Boston: Beacon Press, 1998.
- The great house of birds: Classic writings about birds. (editor) San Francisco: Sierra Club Books, 1996.
- Mind the gap: The education of a nature writer. Reno: University of Nevada Press, 2004.
