= Cape Cod Museum of Natural History =

Museum in Brewster, Massachusetts, US

- Location on Cape Cod
- Former name: Cape Cod Junior Museum (1954–1959); Cape Cod Junior Museum of Natural History (1959–1962)
- Established: 20 February 1954
- Location: 869 Main Street, Brewster, Massachusetts, United States
- Coordinates: 41.754°N 70.116°W
- Type: Natural history, archaeology
- President: Stephen Miles Uzzo
- Website: ccmnh.org

The Cape Cod Museum of Natural History is a small museum in Brewster, Massachusetts, focusing on natural history and archeology. It consists of a main building with exhibits on local natural history and archeology, including an outdoor butterfly house and 400 acres (160 ha) of museum- and town-owned conservation land with walking trails.

== History ==
The Cape Cod Museum of Natural History was first proposed as the Cape Cod Junior Museum at a meeting on February 20, 1954. Its mission from the beginning was to educate children and adults about local plant, animal, and marine life. From 1955 to 1980, its president was naturalist John Hay.

The museum did not have a permanent location at first, but it created portable educational exhibits for local schools. In 1956, the museum opened a temporary location on the second floor of Brewster Town Hall. In 1958, the museum purchased its first conservation land, consisting of 37 acres (15 ha) in the Stony Book Valley area of Brewster, Massachusetts, and it changed its name in 1959 to the Cape Cod Junior Museum of Natural History. It was relocated to a tent on the new land, and its first permanent building was constructed in 1960 and is now used as the Summer Pavilion. In 1962, the museum changed its name once again to the Cape Cod Museum of Natural History. Its floor space was increased in 1968 with the dedication of a new museum with offices and exhibit areas, and the Clarence Hay Library was dedicated. In 2016, the museum opened a butterfly house and a Pollinator Path to educate visitors about pollinators.

== Description ==
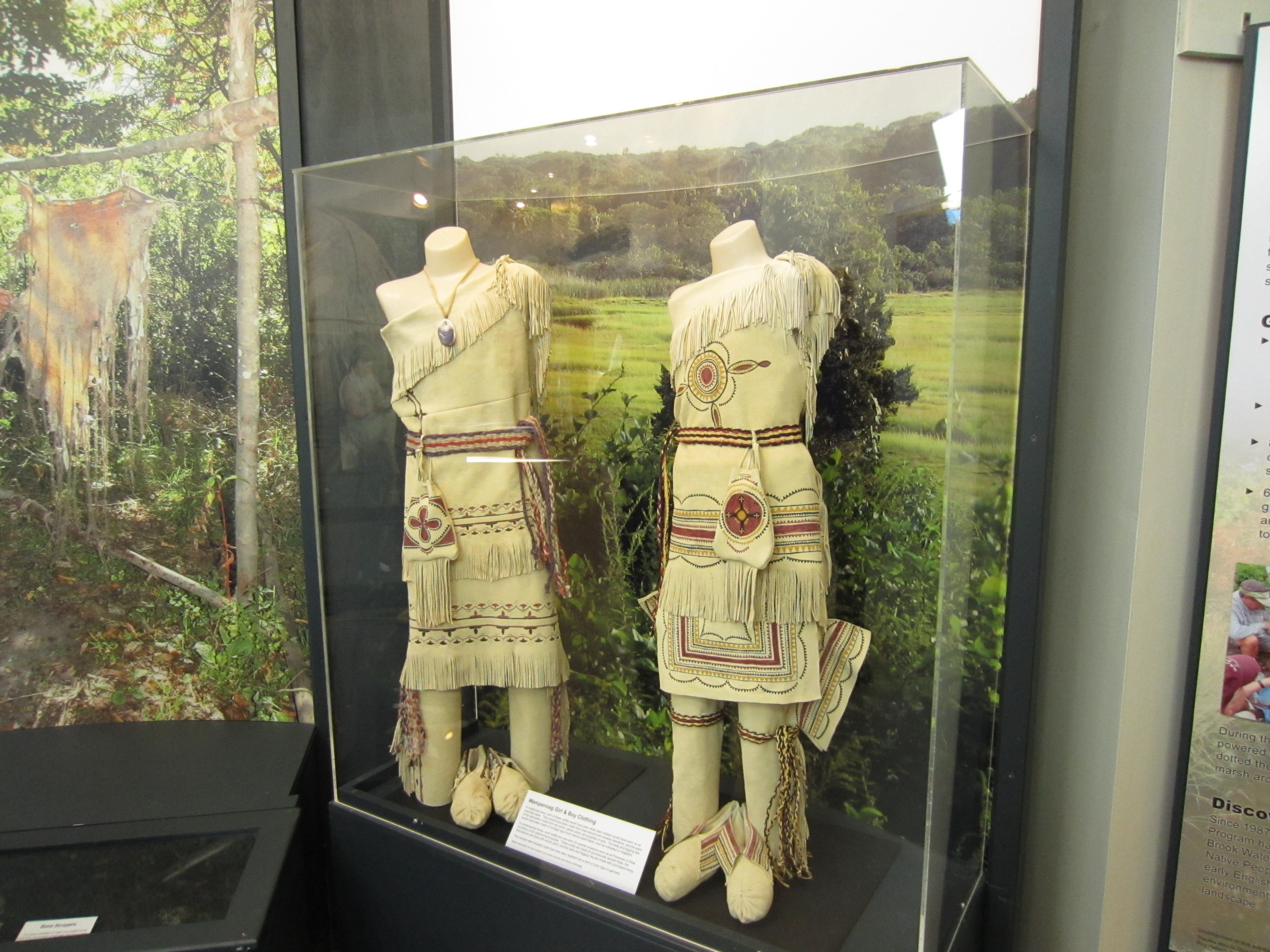
Traditional Wampanoag clothing on display.

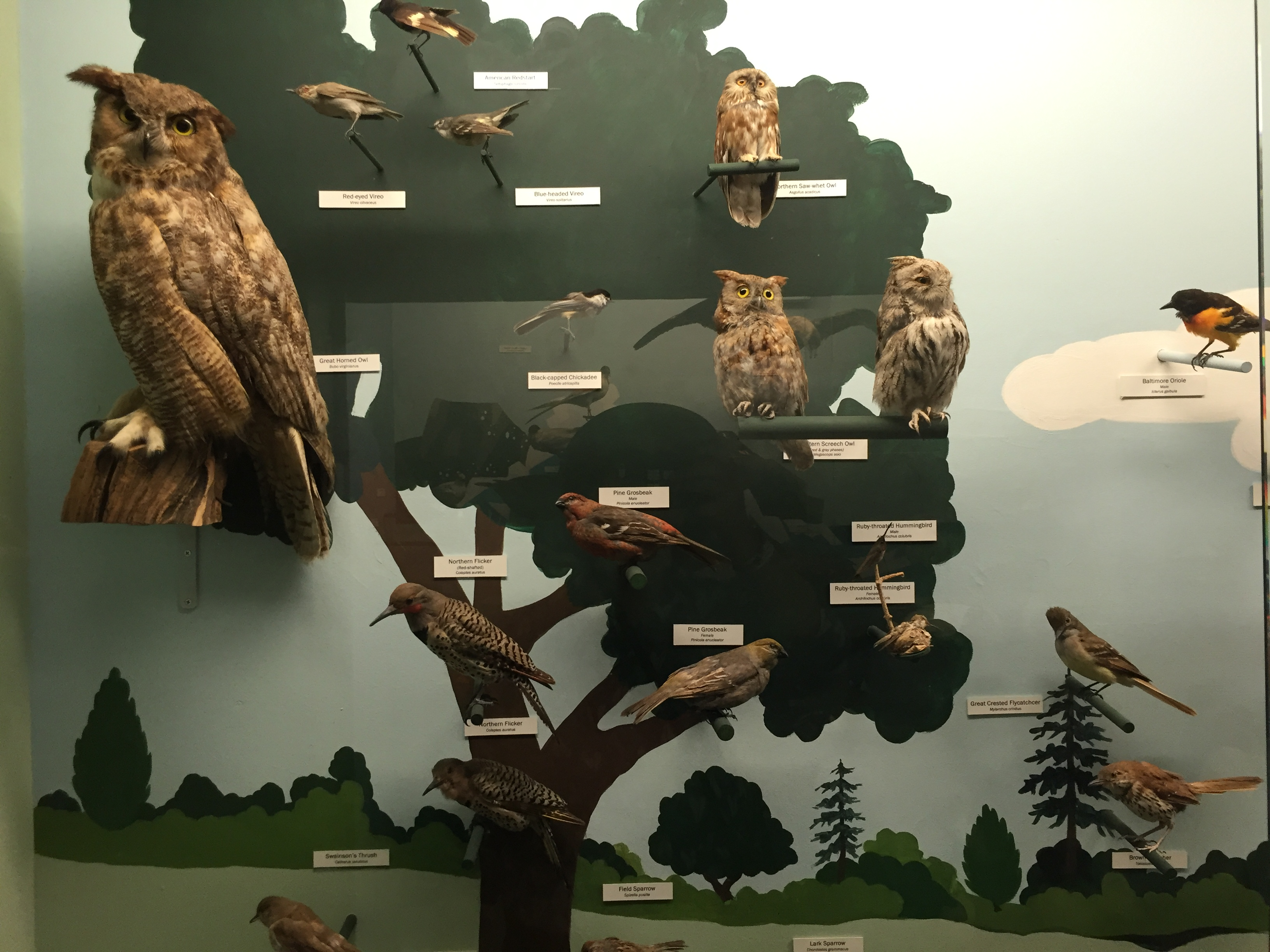
Variety of birds on display.

The Cape Cod Museum of Natural History consists of a 17,000-square-foot (1,600 m^{2}) main building with exhibit and office space. The museum owns 80 acres (32 ha) of land and abuts another 320 acres (130 ha) of town and conservation land. The combined land covers a wide range of habitats, including pitch pine woodlands, salt marshes, a barrier beach, beech forests, and a small river, Stony Brook, which functions as a herring run during the spring. The museum maintains three trails on this land.

The museum houses exhibits on topics related to local natural history and archeology, including a small aquarium featuring over eighty different species of local freshwater and saltwater marine life, a butterfly house, several beehives, a collection of taxidermied birds, and a collection of wooden birds carved by Eldridge Arnold. The museum's Marshview Room provides a view over conservation lands with binoculars for birdwatching and a monitor displaying a livestream of the osprey nest in the marsh. The Stony Brook Valley has been inhabited for around 10,000 years, and the museum's archeological exhibit offers information about the area's settlement by indigenous people such as the Wampanoags, the subsequent arrival of English settlers in the 17th century, and the rise of industry in Stony Brook Valley in the 19th century. The museum also features a 44-foot (13 m) inflatable humpback whale and a walk-through inflatable gray whale that it uses to teach visitors about whales.

In addition to its exhibits, the Cape Cod Museum of Natural History engages in educational outreach such as summer programs for children, classes and lectures, and live-streaming webcams showing a view of nesting birds.

== See also ==
- Stony Brook–Factory Village Historic District
- List of museums in Massachusetts
- List of nature centers in Massachusetts
