= Nickerson Mansion =

Historic house in Massachusetts, United States

- U.S. National Register of Historic Places
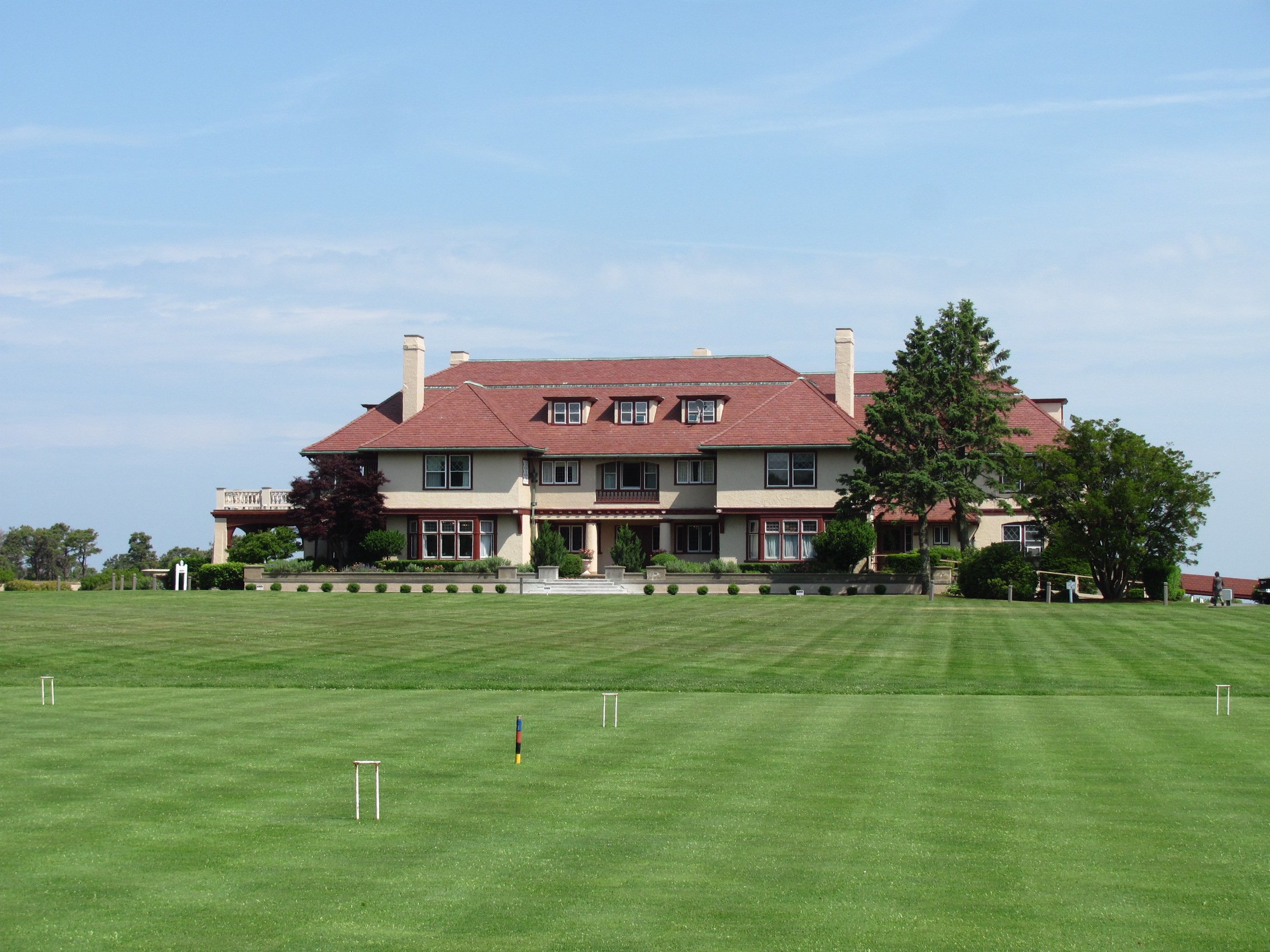
- Nickerson Mansion

- Location within Cape Cod Location within Massachusetts Location within the United States
- Location: 2907 Main St., Brewster, Massachusetts
- Coordinates: 41°46′22″N 70°3′10″W
- Built: 1906
- Architect: Chapman & Frazer; Horace Frazer
- NRHP reference No.: 86000300
- Added to NRHP: February 20, 1986

The Nickerson Mansion is a historic house in Brewster, Massachusetts. The large mansion was built in 1907 by Addie Nickerson and her son Samuel on the foundation of an 1890 mansion that was built by Addie's late father-in-law, Samuel Mayo Nickerson, for his son Roland's family (Addie was married to Roland Crosby Nickerson) to use as a summer home. The building's interior was lavishly appointed with Italian marble and hand-carved woodwork. The Nickersons owned the property until 1945, when it was purchased by the Missionaries of La Salette, who used it as a seminary. It is now one of the centerpieces of the Ocean Edge Resort under the name "The Mansion at Ocean Edge". (The portion now serving as a boutique hotel was inducted into Historic Hotels of America, the official program of the National Trust for Historic Preservation, in 2022.)

The mansion was listed on the National Register of Historic Places in 1986.

== See also ==
- National Register of Historic Places listings in Barnstable County, Massachusetts
