= Brewster (CDP), Massachusetts =

Brewster, Massachusetts
- Census-designated place
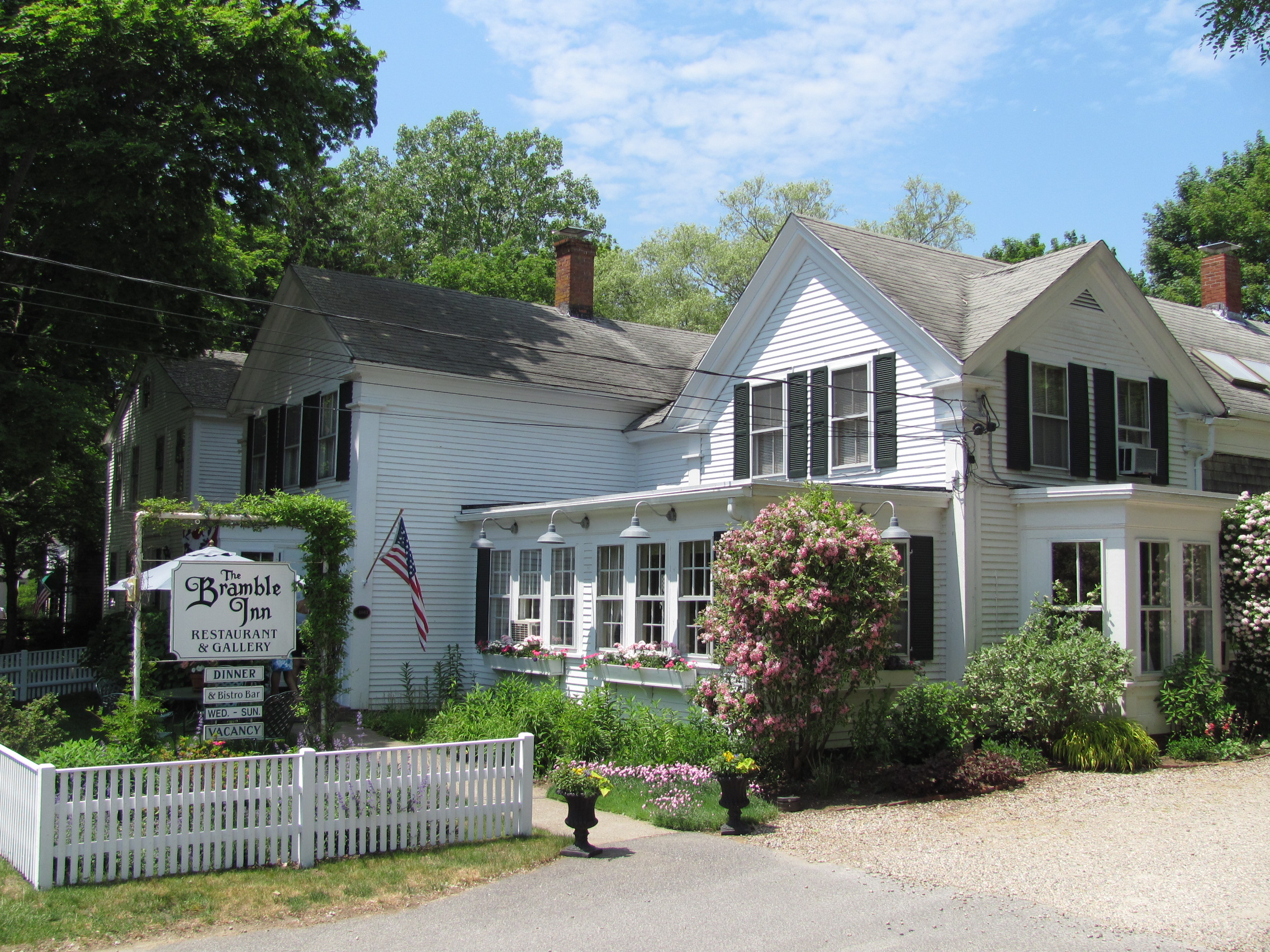
- Bramble Inn

- Location in Barnstable County and the state of Massachusetts.
- Coordinates: 41°45′58″N 70°4′38″W
- Country: United States
- State: Massachusetts
- County: Barnstable
- Town: Brewster

Area
  - Total: 3.95 sq mi (10.24 km^{2})
  - Land: 3.90 sq mi (10.09 km^{2})
  - Water: 0.058 sq mi (0.15 km^{2})
- Elevation: 30 ft (9 m)

Population (2020)
  - Total: 2,028
  - Density: 520.4/sq mi (200.91/km^{2})
- Time zone: UTC-5 (Eastern (EST))
  - Summer (DST): UTC-4 (EDT)
- ZIP code: 02631
- Area code: 508
- FIPS code: 25-07945
- GNIS feature ID: 0615907

Brewster is a census-designated place (CDP) in the town of Brewster in Barnstable County, Massachusetts, United States. The population was 2,000 at the 2010 census, out of 9,820 in the town of Brewster as a whole.

== Geography ==
Brewster is located at 41°45′57″N 70°4′37″W (41.766017, -70.077187).

According to the United States Census Bureau, the CDP has a total area of 3.9 square miles (10.2 km^{2}), of which 3.9 square miles (10.0 km^{2}) is land and 0.039 square miles (0.1 km^{2}) (1.47%) is water.

== Demographics ==
Historical population
Census	Pop.	Note	%±
2020	2,028		—
U.S. Decennial Census

As of the census of 2000, there were 2,212 people, 1,018 households, and 628 families residing in the CDP. The population density was 221.8 people/km^{2} (574 people/mi^{2}). There were 2,129 housing units at an average density of 213.5 units/km^{2} (553 units/mi^{2}). The racial makeup of the CDP was 97.33% White, 1.08% Black or African American, 0.54% Native American, 0.59% Asian, 0.05% Pacific Islander, 0.18% from other races, and 0.23% from two or more races. Hispanic or Latino of any race were 1.18% of the population.

There were 1,018 households, out of which 18.0% had children under the age of 18 living with them, 53.2% were married couples living together, 7.0% had a female householder with no husband present, and 38.3% were non-families. 32.3% of all households were made up of individuals, and 18.8% had someone living alone who was 65 years of age or older. The average household size was 2.11 and the average family size was 2.65.

In the CDP, the population was spread out, with 16.9% under the age of 18, 4.2% from 18 to 24, 20.4% from 25 to 44, 26.4% from 45 to 64, and 32.0% who were 65 years of age or older. The median age was 52 years. For every 100 females, there were 86.5 males. For every 100 females age 18 and over, there were 83.7 males.

The median income for a household in the CDP was $40,815, and the median income for a family was $53,333. Males had a median income of $41,143 versus $31,471 for females. The per capita income for the CDP was $24,350. About 3.1% of families and 6.5% of the population were below the poverty line, including 9.0% of those under age 18 and 4.2% of those age 65 or over.
