= Brewster Old King's Highway Historic District =

Historic district in Massachusetts, United States

- U.S. National Register of Historic Places
- U.S. Historic district
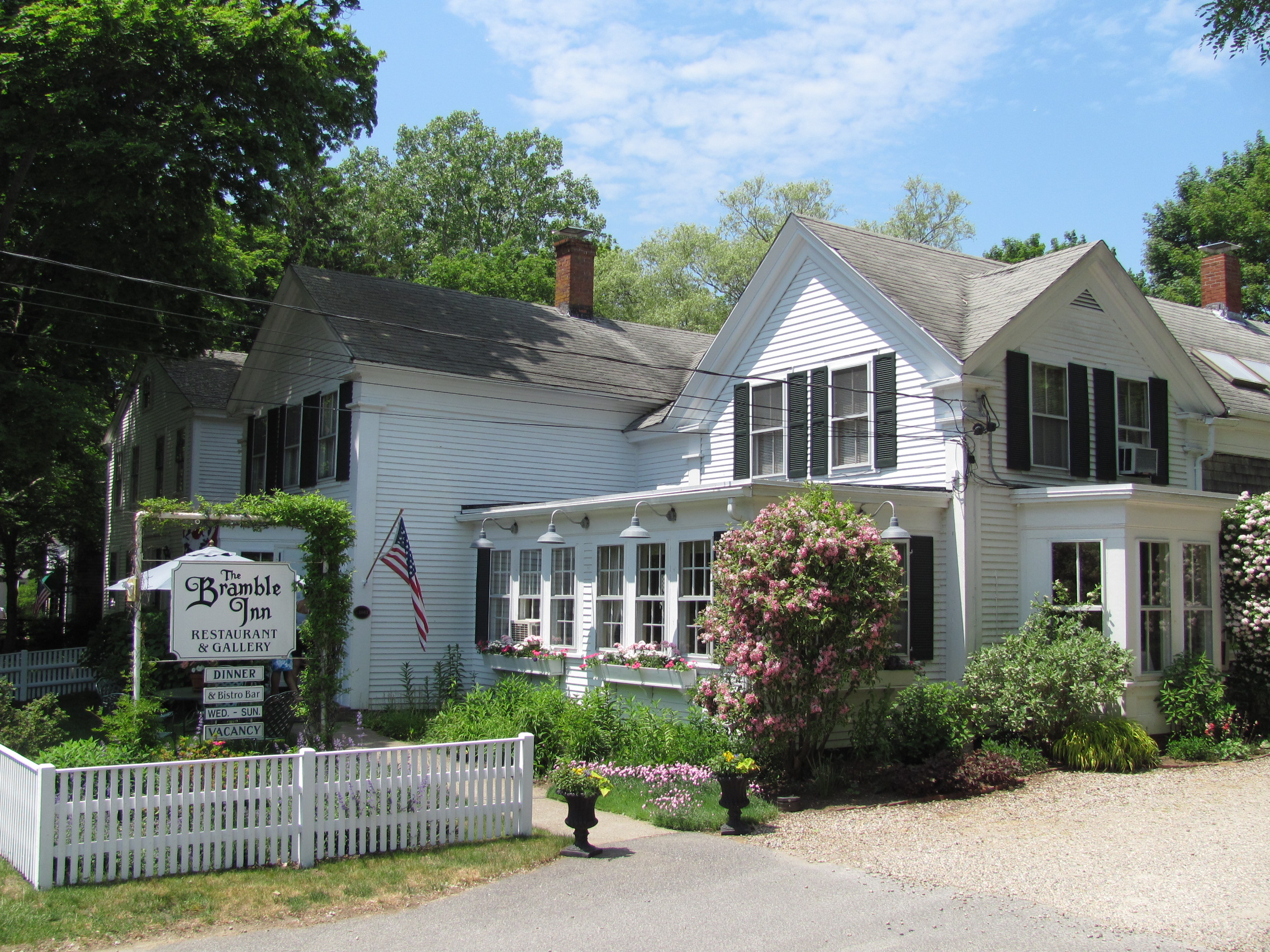
- The Bramble Inn on Route 6A

- Location within Cape Cod Location within Massachusetts Location within the United States
- Location: Brewster, Massachusetts
- Coordinates: 41°45′31″N 70°5′13″W
- Area: 260 acres (110 ha)
- Built: 1790
- Architect: Winslow, Walter T.; Peterson, Whittemore
- Architectural style: Federal, Mid 19th Century Revival, Late Victorian
- NRHP reference No.: 96000162
- Added to NRHP: February 23, 1996

The Brewster Old King's Highway Historic District is a historic district encompassing much of Massachusetts Route 6A and portions of some adjacent roads in Brewster, Massachusetts, which was known as the Old King's Highway during colonial times. The center of Brewster grew around the junction of the Old King's Highway and Harwich Road (now Massachusetts Route 124), with its first church built there in 1700 (the current church is a Greek Revival structure built in 1834), and a nearby burying ground established in 1707. The civic and commercial functions of the town were spread along the Old King's Highway through the 19th and into the early 20th century. This concentration of historic resources extends about 1.5 miles (2.4 km) west of the main junction, and about 1.2 miles (1.9 km) eastward.

Prominent landmarks in the district, in addition to the church, include the Old Town Hall, a richly detailed Queen Anne structure built in 1881; it is located at the junction of the highway with Chatham Street (Massachusetts Route 137). The 1868 Brewster Ladies Library is a fine example of Stick style, and was the first purpose-built library building on Cape Cod. The current Town Hall was built in 1925, and originally served as a school. Two 19th-century school buildings also survive in the district: the No. 2 Schoolhouse, an Italianate two-room building first used as a high school, overlooks Schoolhouse Pond, while the more modest No. 3 Schoolhouse (1850) has been repurposed as a barn.

The district was listed on the National Register of Historic Places in 1996.

== See also ==
- Old King's Highway Historic District includes Route 6a in Barnstable
- National Register of Historic Places listings in Barnstable County, Massachusetts
