= Cliff Pond =

Pond in Massachusetts, United States

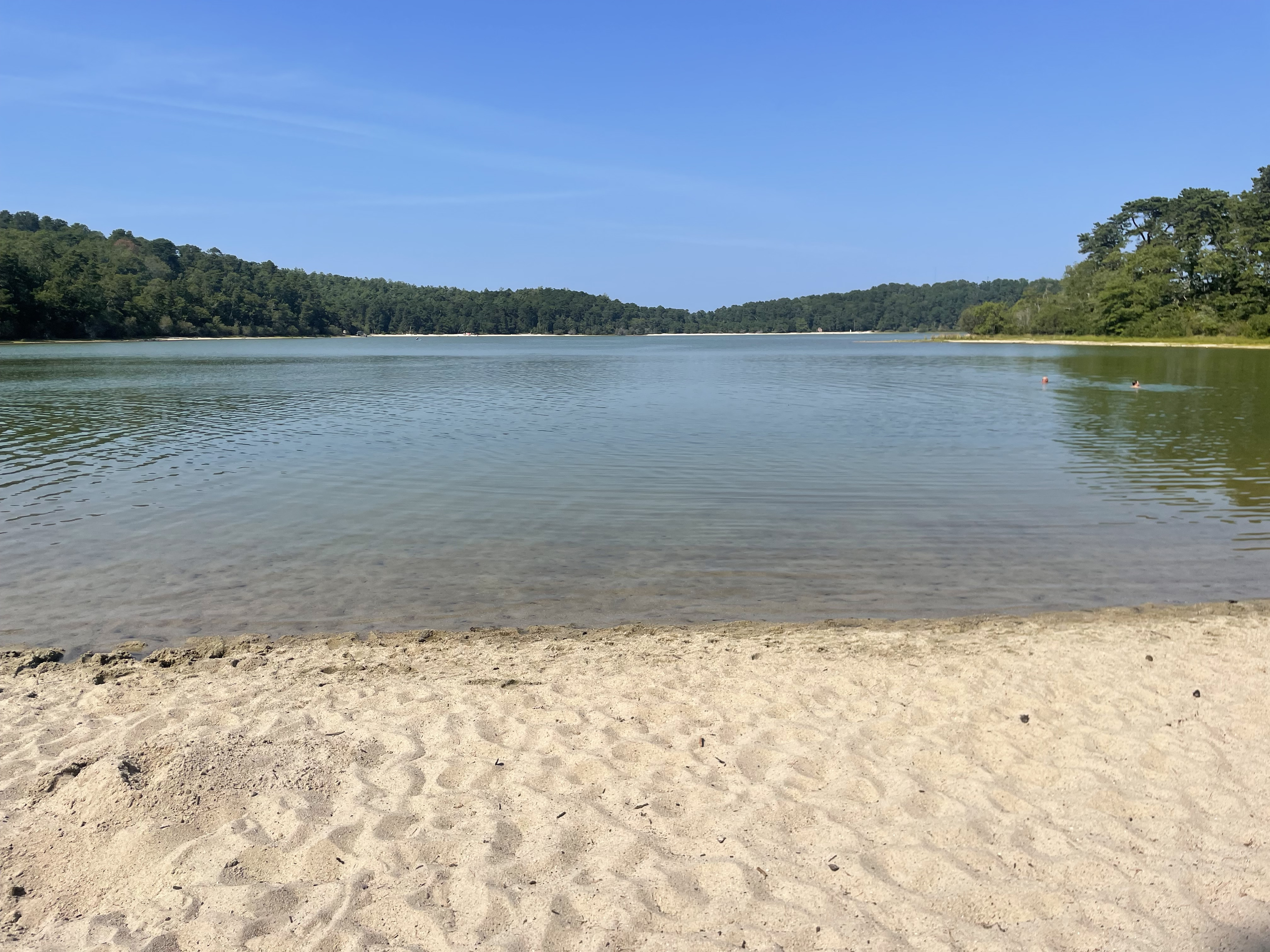

- Location within Massachusetts
- Location: Nickerson State Park; Brewster, Massachusetts
- Coordinates: 41°45′29″N 70°01′27″W
- Type: Kettle pond
- Basin countries: United States
- Surface area: 204 acres (83 ha)
- Average depth: 28 feet (8.5 m)
- Max. depth: 88 feet (27 m)
- Shore length^{1}: 2.6 miles (4.2 km)
- ^{1} Shore length is not a well-defined measure.

Cliff Pond is a 204-acre (830,000 m^{2}) kettle pond in Brewster, Massachusetts. It is the largest pond in Nickerson State Park and is quite popular with swimmers and fishermen in summer months.

Cliff Pond was totally reclaimed in 1960 and, like many kettle ponds has been treated for alkalinity over the years. The Massachusetts Division of Fisheries and Wildlife stocks the pond in spring and fall with various trout species. It also has smallmouth bass and various other species. In 1992, a world record American eel (8 pounds, 9 ounces, 46 inches long, 10.5 inches in girth) was caught.

The pond has had repeated problems with bluegreen algae blooms causing closures over the years and was treated in spring 2016 with aluminum sulfate. Water transparency has improved and the treatment is expected to last twenty years.
