= Dillingham House (Brewster) =

Historic house in Brewster Massachusetts, United States

- U.S. National Register of Historic Places
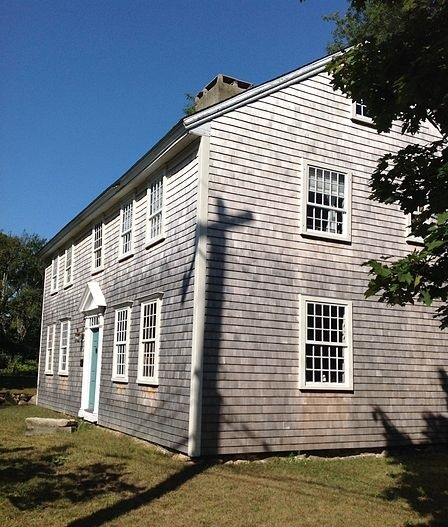

- Location within Cape Cod Location within Massachusetts
- Nearest city: Brewster, Massachusetts
- Coordinates: 41°44′57″N 70°7′31″W
- Built: c.1660 (NRHP)
- NRHP reference No.: 76000225
- Added to NRHP: April 30, 1976

The Dillingham House is a historic 17th century First Period house located at Main Street (Massachusetts Route 6A) in Brewster, Massachusetts, United States.

== Description and history ==
According to the NRHP, this house is said to have been constructed by John Dillingham no later than 1660. It was later enlarged and restored between 1915 and 1918. These additions include a shed dormer, two more bedrooms and a bathroom on the second floor, and an enclosed sleeping porch. The house as it stands now is a 2 1/2-story timber-frame full saltbox which has received small alterations on its exterior. In the interior of the home, features such as 18th century paneling and molding along with original 17th century summer beams still remain. The "Dillingham House" was added to the National Register of Historic Places on April 30, 1976, and has since been modernized to include heat, electricity, and plumbing.

== See also ==
- List of the oldest buildings in Massachusetts
