= Elijah Cobb =

American sea captain

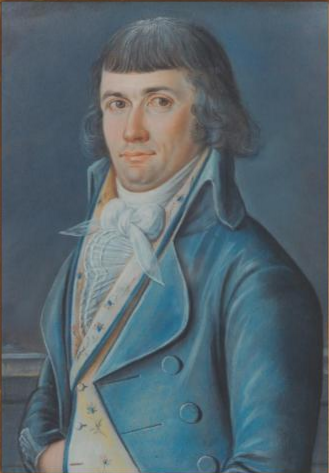
Captain Elijah Cobb

Elijah Cobb (July 4, 1768 – November 21, 1848) was an American sea captain who was captured by the French in 1794 and was released by order of Maximilian Robespierre.

Captain Cobb was born in Harwich, Massachusetts, on July 4, 1768. His father died at sea, leaving his mother with six children. In 1794, his ship was captured by the French, but Captain Cobb managed to get a private audience with Maximilian Robespierre, the French leader at the time. Captain Cobb was among the 1,000 people who watched his execution by guillotine 10 days later. Captain Cobb was later captured during the War of 1812 and imprisoned in Canada. He retired in 1820 and spent the rest of his life on his Brewster, Massachusetts, farm until he died in 1848. His home was later visited by Helen Keller and Annie Sullivan and they may have posed for a photograph in the backyard.
