= Molly Guion =

American painter (1910-1982)

- Molly Guion at the unveiling of her portrait of Winston Churchill, c. 1946
- Born: Mary Guion; September 23, 1910
- Died: 1982
- Known for: portraits
- Spouse: John Borden Smyth

Molly Guion (23 September 1910 – 1982) was an American portrait painter. She taught at the Art Students League of New York.

== Early life and education ==
Molly Guion was born in New Rochelle, New York on 23 September 1910. Her parents were Clarence Child and Georgia Palmer (Beardsley) Guion.

She attended the Sea Pines School of Charm and Personality for Young Women in Brewster, Massachusetts and Montgomery College. She then studied at the Grand Central School of Art. She was taught by Dimitri Romanovsky.

== Career ==
Guion was initially unsuccessful as a portrait painter in New York. She travelled to Britain to look for work, and was successful there in making contacts and having work commissioned by well-known people. She "spent several years 'painting lords and dukes, staying in castles, having a marvelous time'". She painted Winston Churchill in 1946. She was commissioned to paint The Queen's Beasts at Westminster Abbey in 1953.

An exhibition of twenty-three of her portraits, titled Tradition and Pageantry in Britain, was held in Buckingham Palace and then toured the United States in 1952.

In 1977, her rate for portraits was $1,000 to $4,000, with her gallery retaining a third as commission.

Guion taught at the Art Students League of New York.

Her work is held in the Government Art Collection, at the Black Watch Museum at Balhousie Castle and at Orkney Museum. Her painting of Elizabeth II, completed in 1953, was bought by the Wardroom Officers of the Royal Naval Barracks at Portsmouth. One of her several portraits of Thomas E. Dewey is at the Hall of Governors at the New York State Capitol.

== Later life and death ==
She married John Borden Smyth, a naval officer, in 1957. They lived in Rye, New York, in a house which Guion believed to be haunted.

Guion died in 1982.
