= Flax Pond (Brewster, Massachusetts) =

Body of water in Massachusetts

Shubael Pond
- Location within Massachusetts
- Location: Brewster, Massachusetts
- Coordinates: 41°45′59.27″N 70°1′35.75″W
- Type: Kettle pond
- Basin countries: United States
- Surface area: 48 acres (19 ha)
- Max. depth: 75 feet (23 m)
- Shore length^{1}: 1.1 miles (1.8 km)
- ^{1} Shore length is not a well-defined measure.

Shubael Pond is a 48-acre (190,000 m^{2}) kettle pond on Flax Pond Road in Nickerson State Park in Barnstable, Massachusetts.

The pond has a popular swimming area and access for small boats or fishing is over that area. Only electric motors are permitted on the pond.

Shubael Pond is stocked twice a year with several varieties of trout.
