= Old Higgins Farm Windmill =

- U.S. National Register of Historic Places
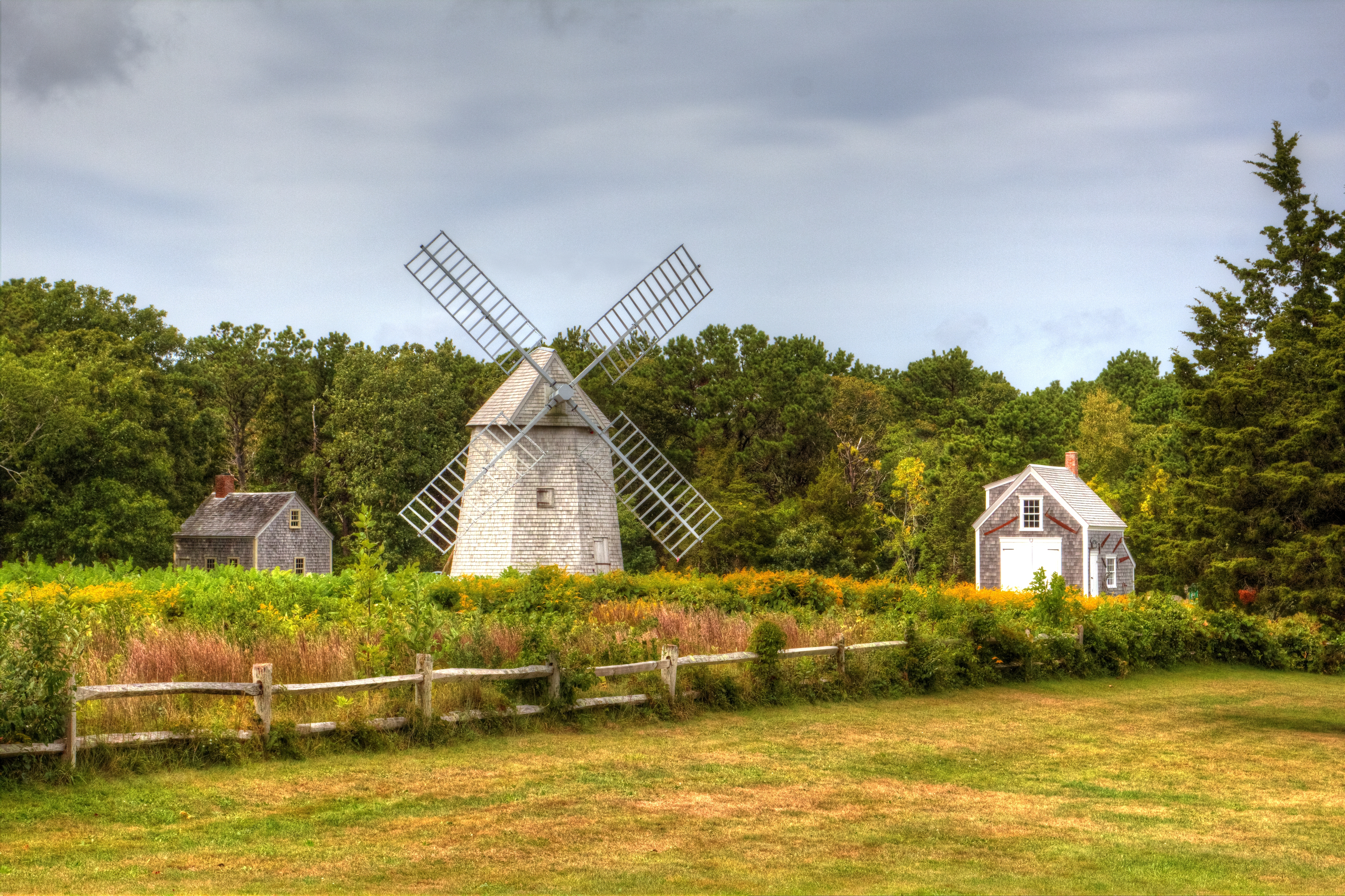
- Old Higgins Farm Windmill

- Location within Cape Cod Location within Massachusetts Location within the United States
- Location: Brewster, Massachusetts
- Coordinates: 41°45′8″N 70°7′16″W
- Built: 1795
- NRHP reference No.: 75000240
- Added to NRHP: June 10, 1975

Old Higgins Farm Windmill is a historic Smock windmill off of Old King's Highway at Drummer Boy Park in Brewster on Cape Cod in Massachusetts.

The windmill was built in 1795, it last ground grain around 1900. The windmill was moved a number of times the last from Ellis Landing in Brewster to its current location in 1974. In 1975 it was added to the National Historic Register of Historic Places.

The windmill was donated by its then owner, Mrs. Samuel Nickerson, in memory of her husband, to the Brewster Historical Society which continues to maintain it at its current location.

== Gallery ==
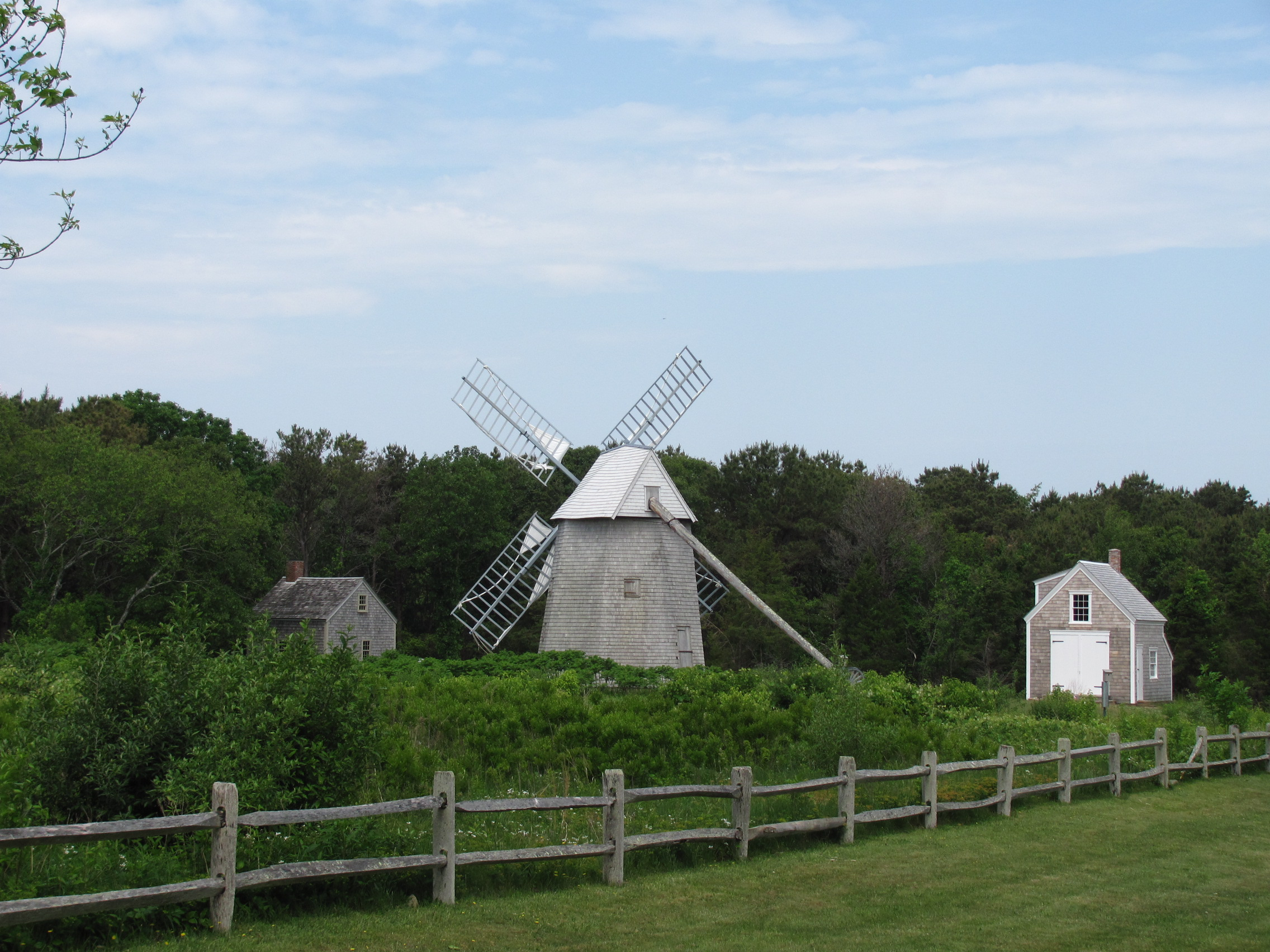

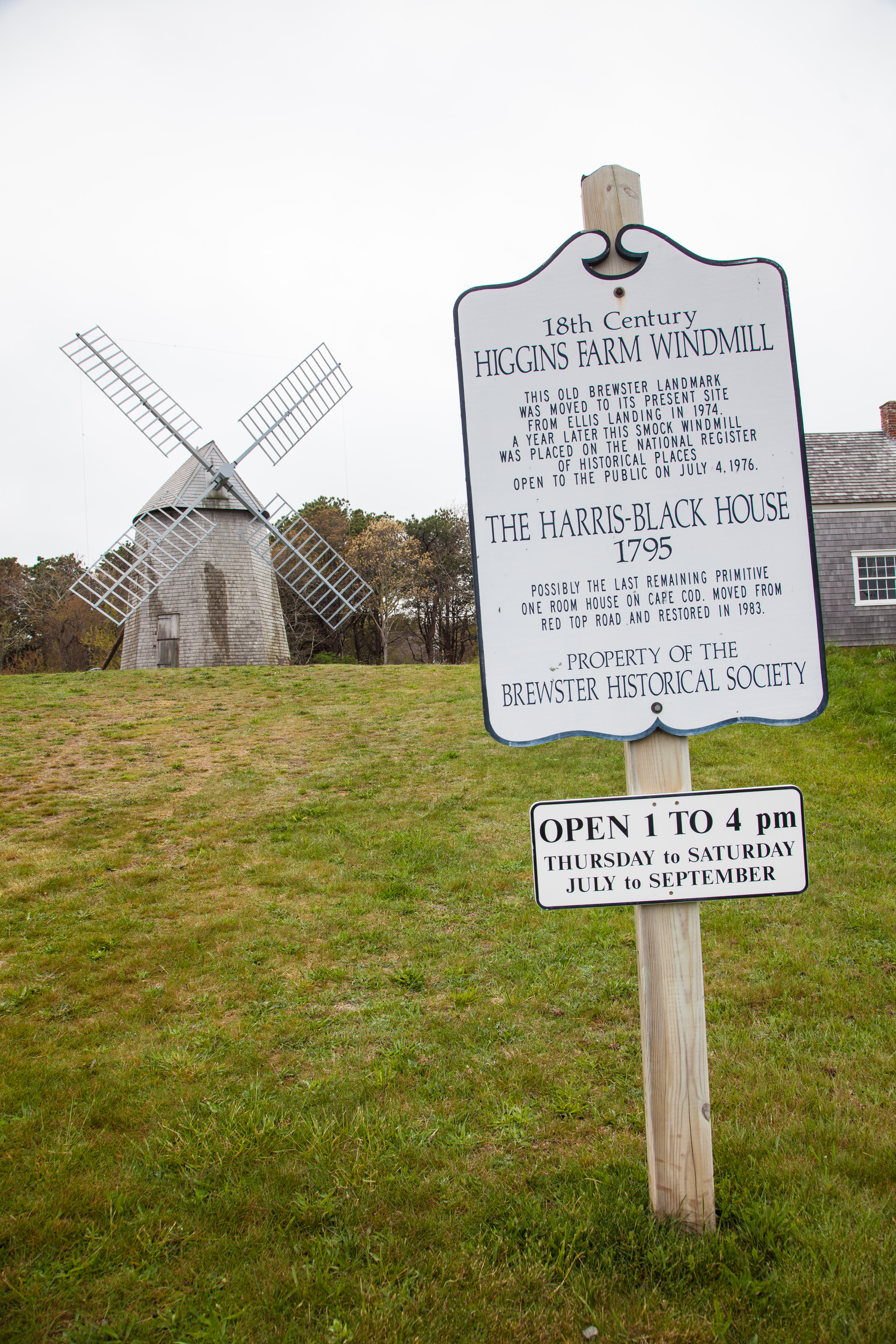

== See also ==
- National Register of Historic Places listings in Barnstable County, Massachusetts
