= Sea Pines School of Charm and Personality for Young Women =

Defunct boarding school in Massachusetts, USA

Coordinates: 41°46′0.01″N 70°3′42.79″W

Information
- Established: 1907
- Closed: 1972

The Sea Pines School of Charm and Personality for Young Women was a coed boarding school located in Brewster, Massachusetts from 1907 to 1972. After its closure, it was purchased in 1977 and became known as the Old Sea Pines Inn.

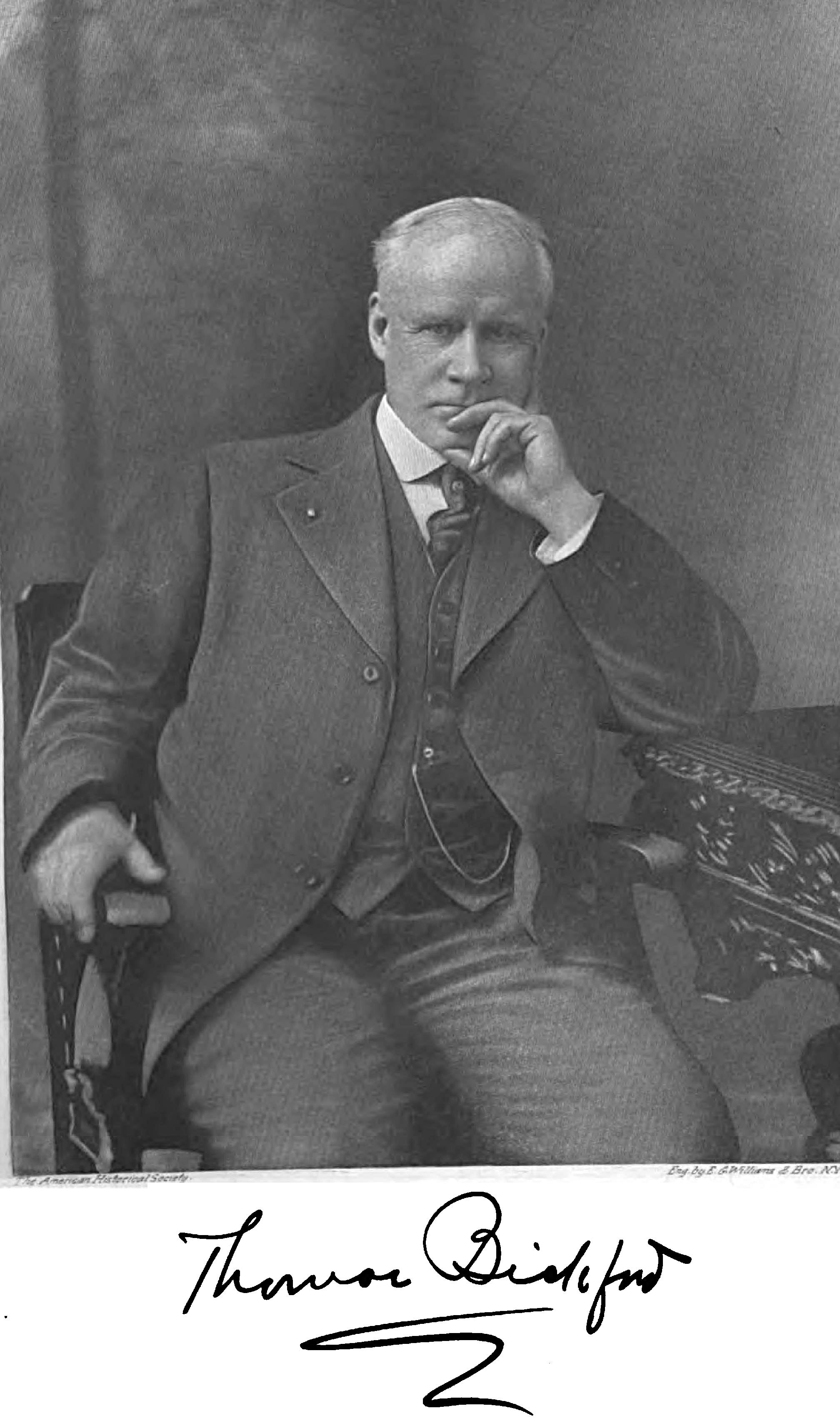
Founder of the school, Reverend Thomas Bickford

== Notable alumni ==
- Molly Guion
