= Nickerson State Park =

State park in Massachusetts, United States

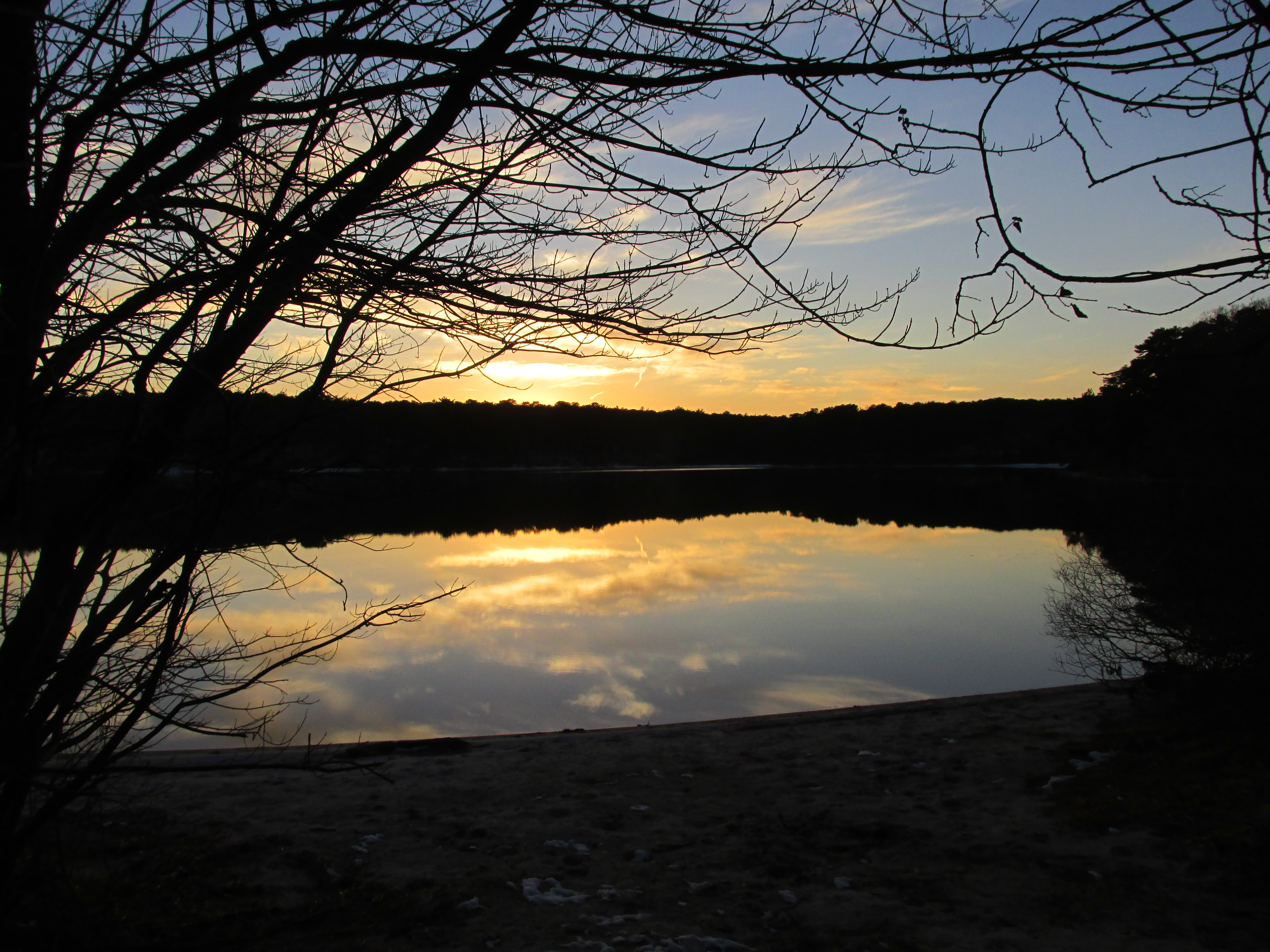
- Flax Pond

- Location within Massachusetts Location within the United States
- Location: Brewster, Massachusetts, United States
- Coordinates: 41°45′29″N 70°01′27″W
- Area: 1,967 acres (796 ha)
- Elevation: 26 ft (7.9 m)
- Established: 1934
- Administrator: Massachusetts Department of Conservation and Recreation
- Website: Official website

Nickerson State Park is a public recreation area of more than 1,900 acres (770 ha) located on Cape Cod in Brewster, Massachusetts, United States. The park's sandy soil and scrub pines surround many kettle ponds which are dependent on groundwater and precipitation. The largest of these are Cliff Pond (the largest at 0.7 miles (1.1 km) across), Flax Pond, Little Cliff Pond, and Higgins Pond. Ruth Pond, Keeler's Pond, Eel Pond, and Triangle Pond provide additional water habitats.

== History ==
The land composing the park was once part of the estate of Samuel Mayo Nickerson (1830–1914), a native of the area and a Chicago liquor distiller who made a fortune as one of the founding officers of the First National Bank of Chicago. In 1890, Nickerson built Fieldstone Hall on land overlooking Cape Cod Bay a mile west of the park to be the home of his son Roland C. Nickerson, Roland's wife Addie, and their three children. Fieldstone Hall was lost to fire in 1906, and a larger mansion was built on the same site. That building subsequently became a seminary and is now a major feature of the Ocean Edge resort.

Roland Nickerson died at age 51 shortly after Fieldstone Hall burned down, his death at the time being ascribed to his heartache at the loss of his home and personal possessions. His son Roland Jr. was a naval lieutenant who died in the 1918 influenza epidemic. In 1934, Addie Nickerson donated the portion of the estate on the south side of Route 6a for use as a "state forest park." It became the Commonwealth's first state park and was named in honor of her late husband and late son.

== Activities and amenities ==
- Camping: The park offers more than 400 campsites including cabins and yurts.
- Trails: In addition to 8 miles (13 km) of roads, the state park has trails for hiking, cross-country skiing, horseback and mountain bike riding, and an 8-mile (13 km) set of bicycle trails that connect to the Cape Cod Rail Trail. The bicycle trails bring riders to white pine stands, spruce stands, a cedar swamp, pond views, and woodlands.
- Fishing: Cliff, Flax, Little Cliff, and Higgins ponds are stocked yearly with trout.
- Other facilities include a boat ramp, lakes for canoeing and swimming, showers, interpretive programs, and an amphitheater.
- There are also wheelchair-accessible beaches, camping, fishing and picnicking facilities and restrooms.
