= Stony Brook–Factory Village Historic District =

Historic district in Massachusetts, United States

- U.S. National Register of Historic Places
- U.S. Historic district
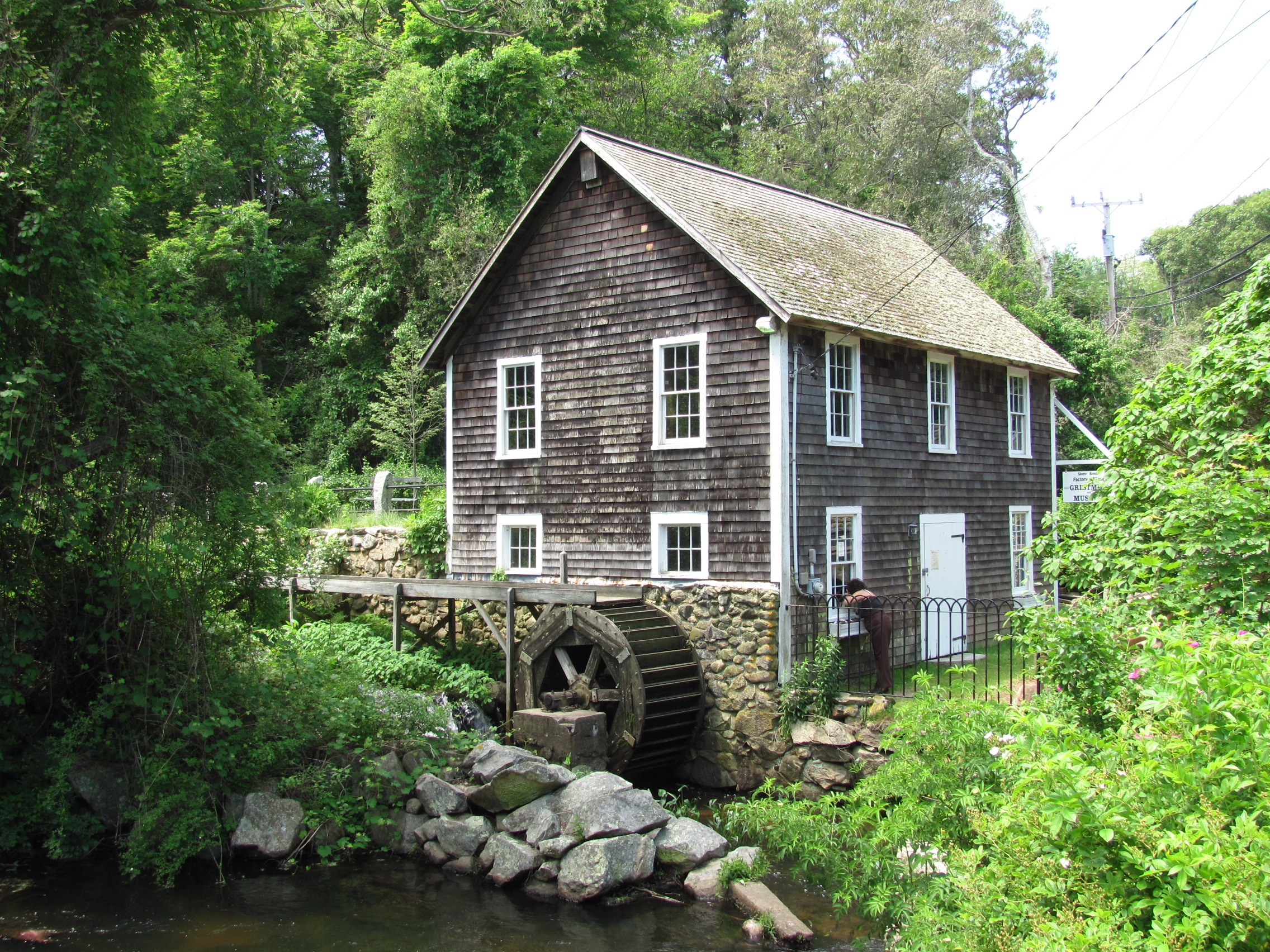
- Stony Brook Grist Mill

- Location within Cape Cod Location within Massachusetts Location within the United States
- Location: Brewster, Massachusetts
- Coordinates: 41°45′31″N 70°5′13″W
- Area: 85 acres (34 ha)
- Built: 1790
- NRHP reference No.: 00000688
- Added to NRHP: June 15, 2000

The Stony Brook–Factory Village Historic District is a historic district encompassing one of largest and best-preserved industrial villages in Barnstable County, Massachusetts. It is centered on Stony Brook, a stream that flows north into Cape Cod Bay in western Brewster. The industrial power of the stream was recognized in the 17th century, and was actively used into the late 19th century. The 85-acre (34 ha) district is centered on the junction of Satucket Road and Stony Brook Road, radiating away along those roads and for a short distance along Run Hill Road. The architecture of the district is predominantly Greek Revival, although later 19th century styles and 18th century Georgian styles are also represented. It also includes the sites of three mills, including dams, raceways, and a mill pond.

The district was added to the National Register of Historic Places in 2000.

== See also ==
- National Register of Historic Places listings in Barnstable County, Massachusetts
