= Brewster, Massachusetts =

- Town
- Linnell Landing Beach, on Cape Cod Bay

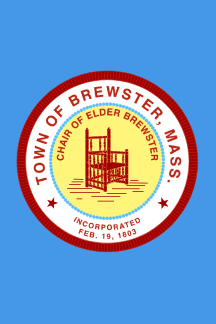
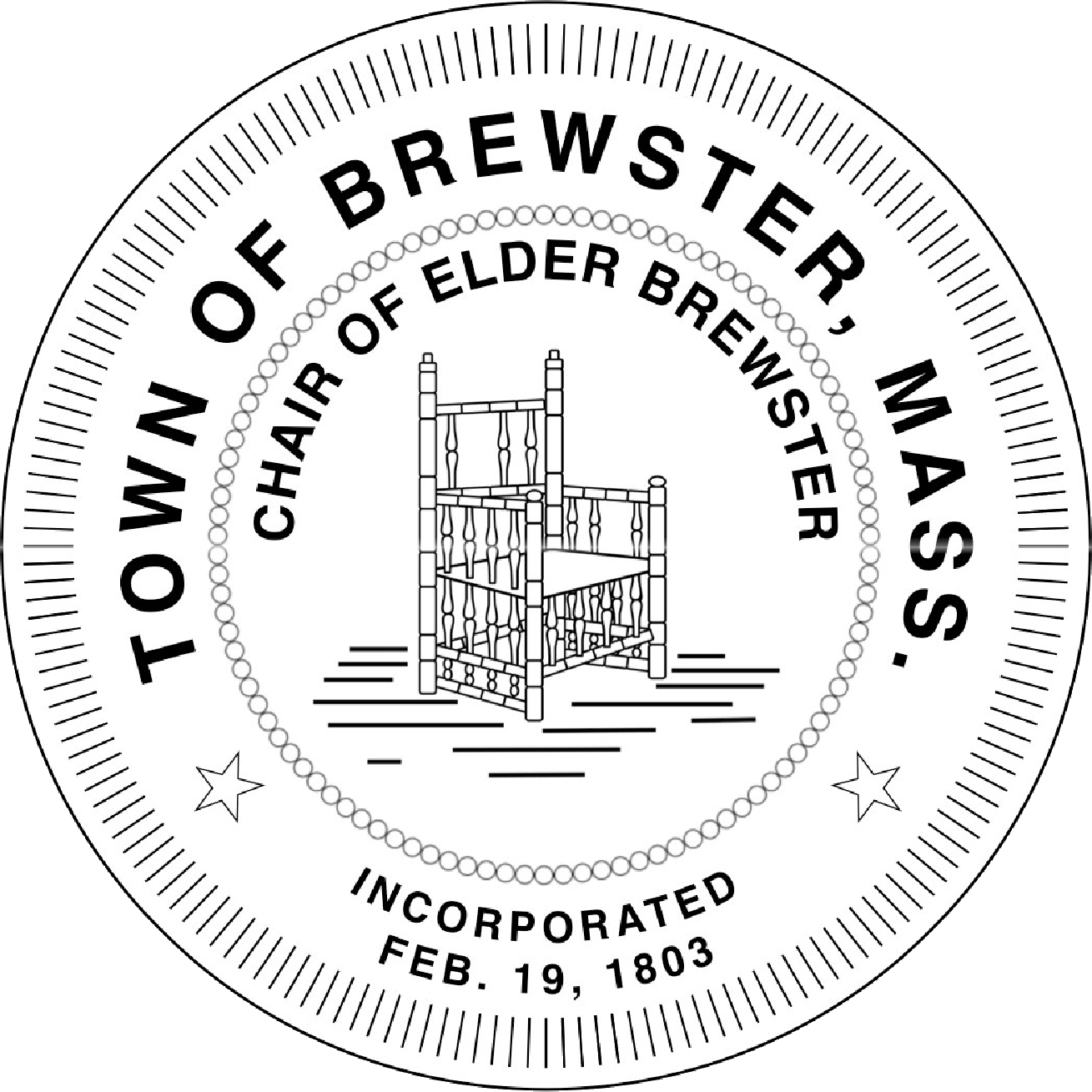
- Flag Seal

- Location in Barnstable County and the state of Massachusetts
- Coordinates: 41°45′36″N 70°05′00″W
- Country: United States
- State: Massachusetts
- County: Barnstable
- Settled: 1656
- Incorporated: 1803
- Communities: Brewster; East Brewster; South Brewster; West Brewster

Government
  - Type: Open town meeting
  - Town Administrator: Peter Lombardi

Area
  - Total: 25.4 sq mi (65.9 km^{2})
  - Land: 22.9 sq mi (59.3 km^{2})
  - Water: 2.5 sq mi (6.6 km^{2})
- Elevation: 39 ft (12 m)

Population (2020)
  - Total: 10,318
  - Density: 450/sq mi (174/km^{2})
- Time zone: UTC−5 (Eastern)
  - Summer (DST): UTC−4 (Eastern)
- ZIP Code: 02631
- Area code: 508 / 774
- FIPS code: 25-07980
- GNIS feature ID: 0618249
- Website: www.brewster-ma.gov

Brewster /ˈbruːstər/ is a town on Cape Cod in Massachusetts. The population of Brewster was 10,318 at the 2020 census. It contains the census-designated place of the same name.

Initially settled in 1659, the Town of Brewster is named after Elder William Brewster, the religious leader of Plymouth Colony. Brewster is known as the "Sea Captain's Town" for its wealth of eighteenth and nineteenth century historic captain's homes, including the Cobb House (1799), the current home of the Brewster Historical Society.

Brewster is also notable as the home of Nickerson State Park, a 1,900 acre preserve carved out of the former hunting grounds of the prominent Nickerson Family. The impact of the Nickerson Family can be seen at the Nickerson Mansion, now the home of Ocean Edge Resort. Constructed in 1890, the structure known as Fieldstone Hall was considered one of the most expensive houses built in the country at that time.

The town is a popular summer destination, with the town population increasing to 30,000. It also contains two National Historic Districts: Brewster Old King's Highway Historic District and Stony Brook–Factory Village Historic District, both listed on the National Register of Historic Places.

Brewster is twinned with the town of Budleigh Salterton in the United Kingdom.

== History ==
=== Early history ===
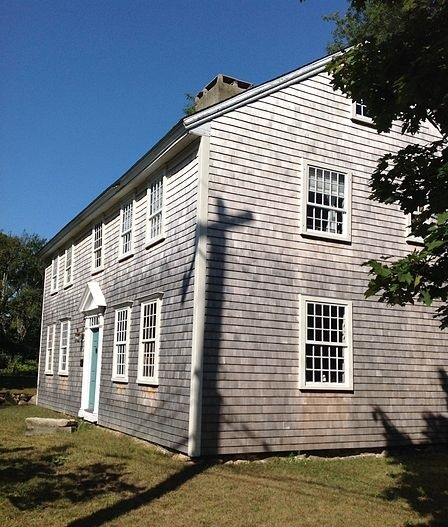
An example of seventeenth century vernacular architecture in Brewster, Dillingham House (c. 1660)

Indigenous settlement in Brewster took place on the north shore of the present-day town, with a Sauguatuckett farming area centered around the contemporary Stony Brook. Individual accounts subdivide the indigenous tribes of pre-contact Cape Cod, but any historians and researches today use the unifying term Nauset. Somewhere around 1,200 indigenous people populated Outer Cape Cod prior to 1617 pandemics, with this number reduced to 500 by 1621. The first permanent colonial settlement in Brewster centered around the Stony Brook area, part of the "Old Comers" or "Purchasers" grant of 1641. The land that now makes up Brewster was purchased in 1653 from Wano and his son Sachemas, leaders of the local Sauguatuckett. By this period, the Sauguatuckett held significant quantities of corn, beans, and squash which were at times for sale to English settlers. Brewster was first officially settled in 1656 as a northeastern parish of the town of Harwich. However, at the turn of the eighteenth century, there were only seventeen known male settlers in what is now Brewster.

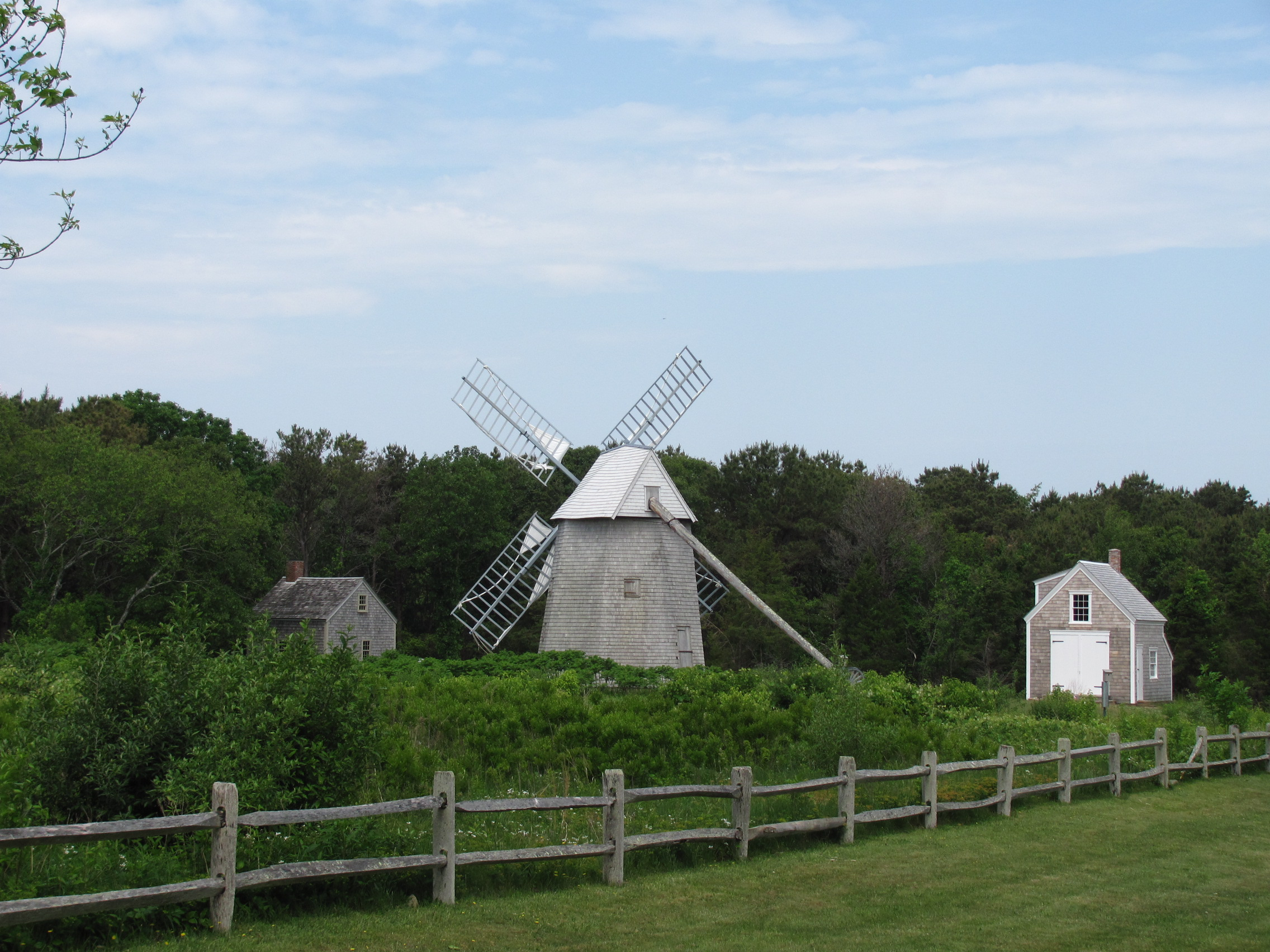
Higgins Farm Windmill, in Drummer Boy Park, Brewster, Mass (1795)

Brewster's first settlers came from Sandwich, Plymouth, and Eastham, as well as many arriving directly from England. Throughout the 1700s, there were interspersed agricultural settlements throughout the area now known as Brewster. The Stony Brook gristmill remains as a testament to the early manufacturing activity at this site. In 1709, a public house and store existed, with a congregational church and meeting house first organized in 1700. By 1750, there were around 190 settlers living in the Brewster environs. The remaining indigenous population in Brewster consolidated around the southwestern corner of the town. Settlers and indigenous people alike utilized the abundant cornfields, as well as the natural resources of Cape Cod Bay. Substantial amounts of herring, or alewife, were, and continue to be, found in the Stony Brook area.

=== Nineteenth century ===
Brewster was officially incorporated as its own town in 1803 when the less wealthy citizens of Harwich were upset that the town's institutions were all concentrated on Brewster's Main Street, now Route 6A, including the town hall and churches. Brewster was named in honor of Elder William Brewster, the first religious leader of the Pilgrims at Plymouth Colony.

By this period, roughly 75% of town inhabitants were involved in shipping and maritime trades. Brewster captains invested an estimated $250,000 on merchant vessels, and a large saltworks was present on the shoreline of Cape Cod Bay during this period. In 1865, Brewster maintained 56 farms, the highest of any town on the Lower Cape aside from Orleans. At this time, Brewster also had the third highest number of cranberry bogs on the Cape, following Harwich and Dennis. Architecturally, Brewster blossomed during this period, with wealthy sea captains and commercial titans constructing Italianate, Greek Revival, and Second Empire homes. The most emblematic structure of this period is Albert Crosby's 1888 Crosby Mansion, located on Crosby Lane.

=== Sites of historical interest ===
- Cape Cod Museum of Natural History
- Stony Brook Grist Mill (1873)
- Dillingham House (1660)
- Nickerson Mansion (1906)
- Old Higgins Farm Windmill (1795)
- Crosby Mansion (1888)

== Gallery ==
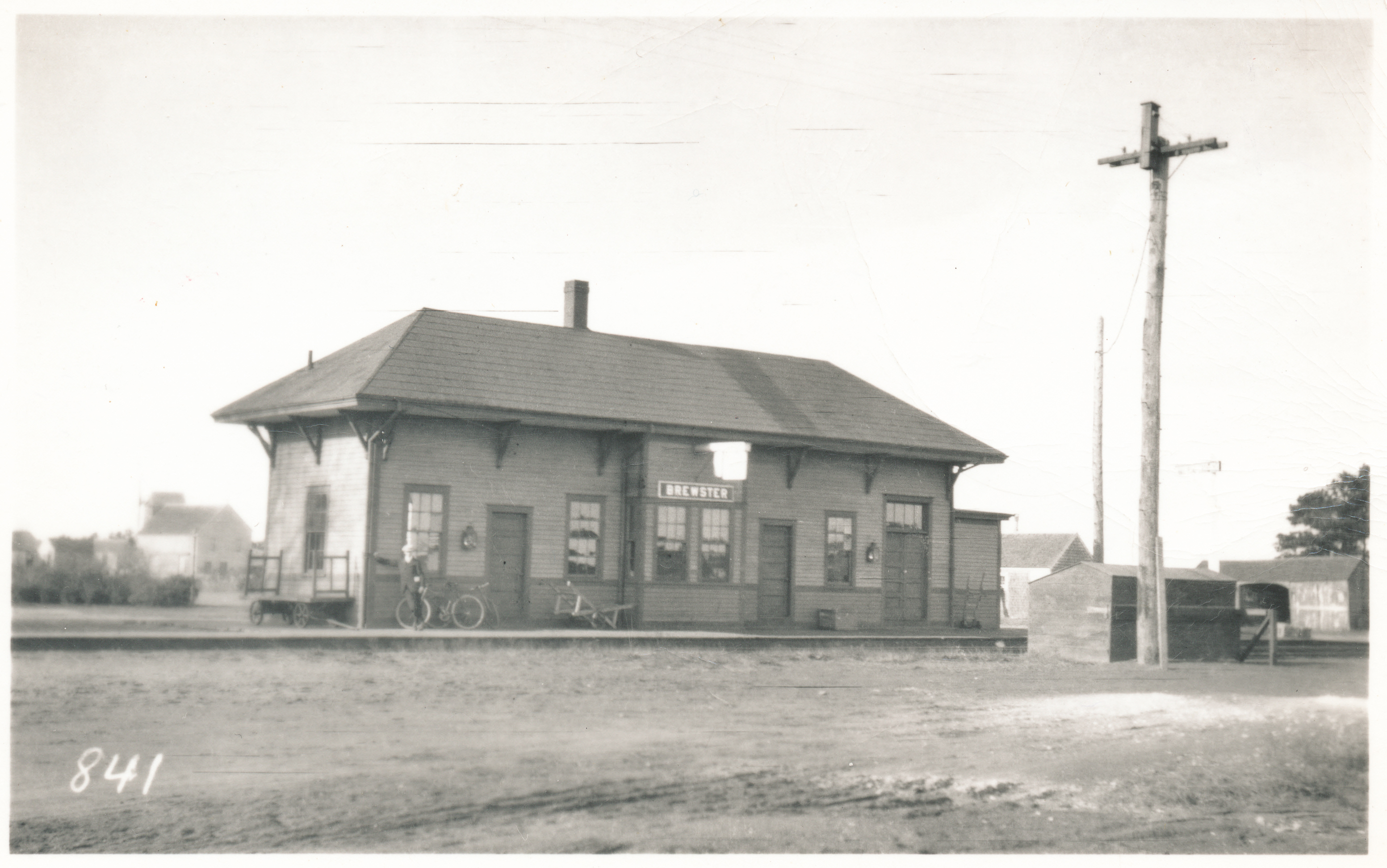
Brewster Station, built by Old Colony Railroad in 1860s, demolished in 1930s

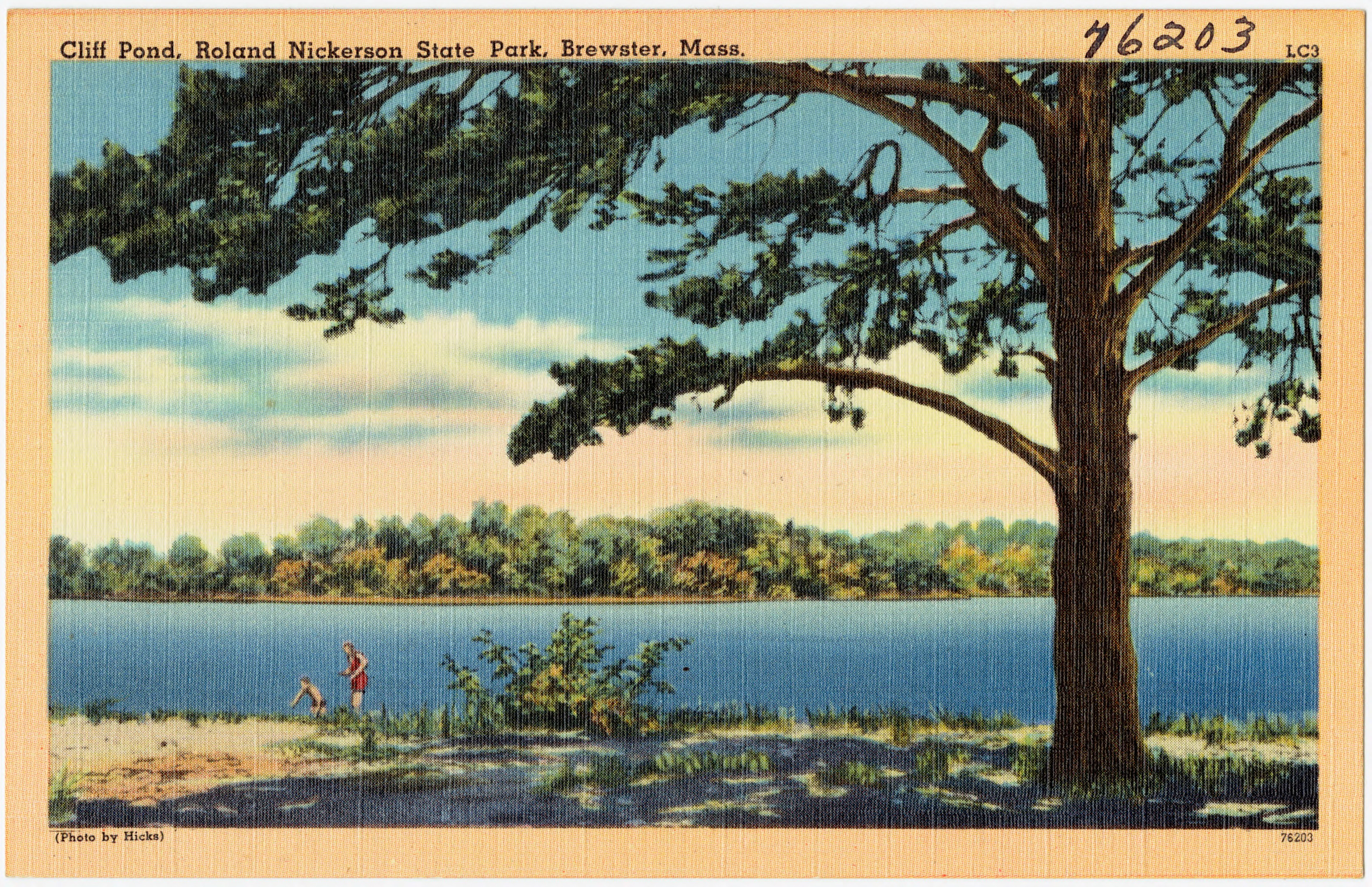
Postcard featuring Cliff Pond in Nickerson State Park

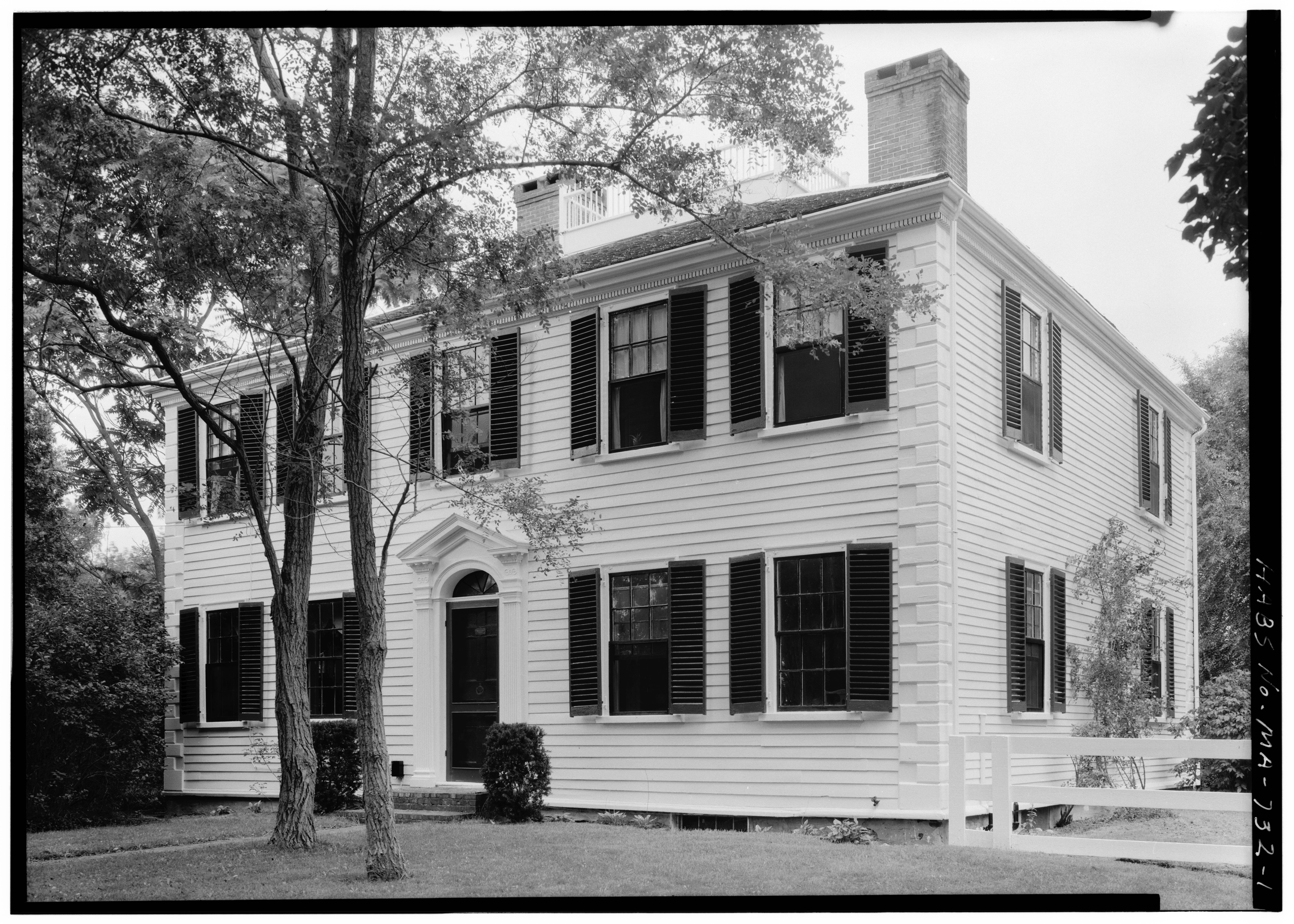
Captain Elijah Cobb House, present home of Brewster Historical Society (1799)

Harris Black House (1795)

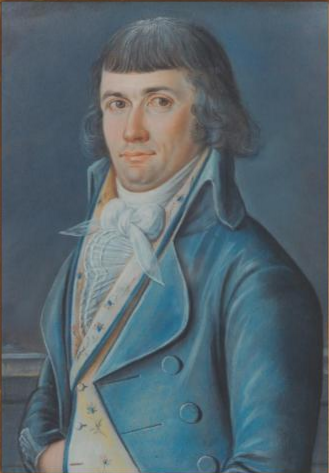
Captain Elijah Cobb, a Brewster sea captain

Old Higgins Farm Windmill, on the National Register of Historic Place (1795)

== Geography ==
According to the United States Census Bureau, the town has a total area of 25.4 square miles (65.9 km^{2}), of which 22.9 square miles (59.3 km^{2}) is land and 2.5 square miles (6.6 km^{2}), or 10.07%, is water.

Brewster is bordered on the north by Cape Cod Bay, on the west by Dennis, on the south by Harwich, and on the east by Orleans. The town is usually separated into two villages, West and East Brewster, both of which comprise the Brewster census-designated place. Brewster is 31 miles (50 km) south of Provincetown, 14 miles (23 km) east of Barnstable, 31 miles (50 km) east of the Sagamore Bridge, and 85 miles (137 km) southeast of Boston.

The town is bordered by the Brewster Flats, an extensive stretch of tidal sand flats to the north, along the shores of Cape Cod Bay. The town is home to the Roland C. Nickerson State Forest Park, the largest state forest on Cape Cod. The town has several large ponds, especially along the Harwich town line. There are several brooks throughout the town, all of which lead to Cape Cod Bay. The bay is home to several boat landings and beaches in the town.

Brewster is home to the largest pond on Cape Cod, Long Pond. The Brewster-Harwich town line goes directly through the middle of the pond. Brewster's second largest pond is Cliff Pond, located in Nickerson State Park. Both are popular destinations.

== Climate ==
According to the Köppen climate classification system, Brewster, Massachusetts has a warm-summer, wet year round, humid continental climate (Dfb). Dfb climates are characterized by at least one month having an average mean temperature ≤ 32.0 °F (≤ 0.0 °C), at least four months with an average mean temperature ≥ 50.0 °F (≥ 10.0 °C), all months with an average mean temperature ≤ 71.6 °F (≤ 22.0 °C), and no significant precipitation difference between seasons. The average seasonal (November–April) snowfall total is approximately 30 inches (76 cm). The average snowiest month is February, which corresponds with the annual peak in nor'easter activity. The plant hardiness zone is 7a, with an average annual extreme minimum air temperature of 4.0 °F (−15.6 °C).

Climate data for Brewster, Barnstable County, Massachusetts (1981–2010 averages)
Month	Jan	Feb	Mar	Apr	May	Jun	Jul	Aug	Sep	Oct	Nov	Dec	Year
Mean daily maximum °F (°C)	37.6 (3.1)	39.0 (3.9)	44.2 (6.8)	51.9 (11.1)	61.3 (16.3)	70.5 (21.4)	77.0 (25.0)	76.3 (24.6)	70.2 (21.2)	60.6 (15.9)	52.4 (11.3)	43.3 (6.3)	57.1 (13.9)
Daily mean °F (°C)	30.7 (−0.7)	32.1 (0.1)	37.3 (2.9)	45.2 (7.3)	54.3 (12.4)	63.7 (17.6)	70.2 (21.2)	69.6 (20.9)	63.3 (17.4)	53.6 (12.0)	45.6 (7.6)	36.3 (2.4)	50.2 (10.1)
Mean daily minimum °F (°C)	23.8 (−4.6)	25.1 (−3.8)	30.5 (−0.8)	38.5 (3.6)	47.3 (8.5)	56.9 (13.8)	63.3 (17.4)	62.9 (17.2)	56.4 (13.6)	46.6 (8.1)	38.7 (3.7)	29.4 (−1.4)	43.4 (6.3)
Average precipitation inches (mm)	3.79 (96)	3.45 (88)	4.57 (116)	4.35 (110)	3.46 (88)	3.58 (91)	3.09 (78)	3.58 (91)	3.70 (94)	3.98 (101)	4.16 (106)	4.09 (104)	45.80 (1,163)
Average relative humidity (%)	71.6	69.9	68.3	71.1	73.7	76.8	79.1	79.6	78.5	75.4	71.7	71.0	73.9
Average dew point °F (°C)	22.6 (−5.2)	23.4 (−4.8)	27.8 (−2.3)	36.4 (2.4)	46.1 (7.8)	56.3 (13.5)	63.4 (17.4)	63.0 (17.2)	56.5 (13.6)	46.0 (7.8)	37.0 (2.8)	27.8 (−2.3)	42.3 (5.7)
Source: PRISM Climate Group

== Ecology ==
According to the A. W. Kuchler U.S. Potential natural vegetation Types, Brewster, Massachusetts, would primarily contain a Northeastern Oak/Pine (110) vegetation type with a Southern Mixed Forest (26) vegetation form.

== Transportation ==
U.S. Route 6 passes through the southeastern corner of Brewster from southwest to northeast, as a two-lane expressway with no exits in the town, although exits 78, 82, 85, and 89 (previously numbered exits 9 through 12) provide access to Brewster via other roads. The five other numbered highways in Brewster are all surface roads. Massachusetts Route 6A passes through the town from east to west as Main Street through the town center. Routes 124 and 137 both have a northern terminus along Route 6A in town; short portions of Routes 28 and 39 also pass through the southeastern corner of town (the portion of 28 is less than 100 yards (91 m) long, and is actually signed as crossing from Harwich directly into Orleans). Brewster has one stop light (blinking red light, four-way stop) at the intersection of Harwich Road (Route 124) and Long Pond Road (Route 137).

There is no rail or air service in the town. The Cape Cod Rail Trail, as well as several other bicycle trails, pass through the town. The nearest public airfield is in Chatham (Chatham Municipal, CQX); the nearest regional airport is Barnstable Municipal Airport (HYA), and the nearest national and international air service is at Logan International Airport in Boston.

== Demographics ==
Historical population
Year	Pop.	±%
1850	1,525	—
1860	1,489	−2.4%
1870	1,259	−15.4%
1880	1,144	−9.1%
1890	1,003	−12.3%
1900	829	−17.3%
1910	631	−23.9%
1920	688	+9.0%
1930	769	+11.8%
1940	827	+7.5%
1950	987	+19.3%
1960	1,236	+25.2%
1970	1,790	+44.8%
1980	5,226	+192.0%
1990	8,440	+61.5%
2000	10,094	+19.6%
2010	9,820	−2.7%
2020	10,318	+5.1%
2022	10,444	+1.2%
* = population estimate. Source: United States census records and Population Estimates Program data.

As of the census of 2000, there were 10,094 people, 4,124 households, and 2,853 families residing in the town. The population density was 439.2 inhabitants per square mile (169.6/km^{2}). There were 7,339 housing units at an average density of 319.3 per square mile (123.3/km^{2}). The racial makeup of the town was 97.24% White, 0.76% Black or African American, 0.23% Native American, 0.76% Asian, 0.03% Pacific Islander, 0.35% from other races, and 0.63% from two or more races. Hispanic or Latino of any race were 1.06% of the population.

There were 4,124 households, out of which 25.7% had children under the age of 18 living with them, 57.9% were married couples living together, 8.9% had a female householder with no husband present, and 30.8% were non-families. Of all households, 24.8% were made up of individuals, and 12.6% had someone living alone who was 65 years of age or older. The average household size was 2.34 and the average family size was 2.79.

In the town, the population was spread out, with 20.9% under the age of 18, 4.3% from 18 to 24, 21.5% from 25 to 44, 27.0% from 45 to 64, and 26.2% who were 65 years of age or older. The median age was 47 years. For every 100 females, there were 86.6 males. For every 100 females age 18 and over, there were 82.2 males.

The median income for a household in the town was $49,276, and the median income for a family was $57,174. Males had a median income of $41,407 versus $33,388 for females. The per capita income for the town was $24,638. About 1.6% of families and 3.7% of the population were below the poverty line, including 1.4% of those under age 18 and 3.1% of those age 65 or over.

== Government ==
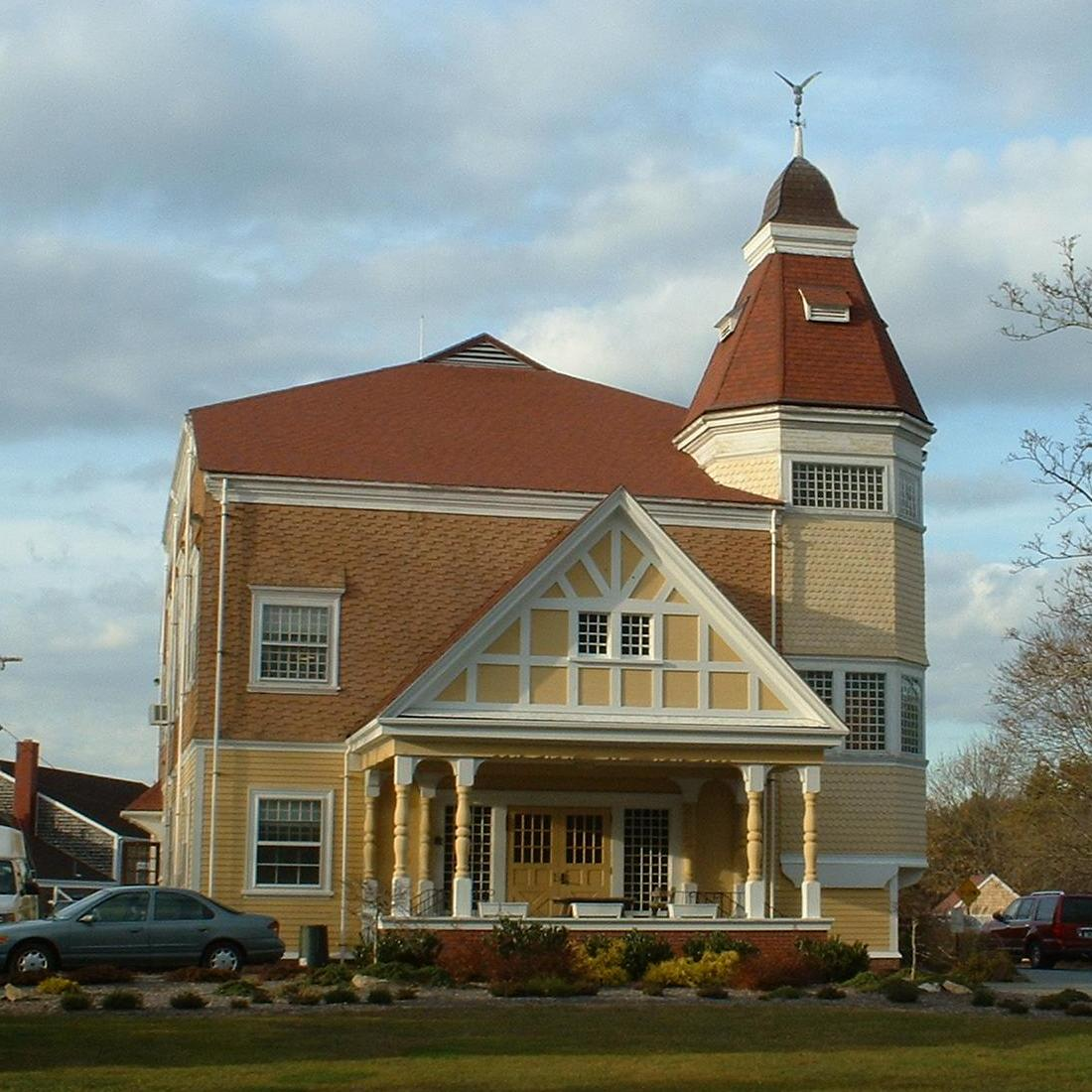
The Old Brewster Town Hall

Brewster is represented in the Massachusetts House of Representatives as a part of the First Barnstable District, along with Dennis and a portion of Yarmouth. The town is represented in the Massachusetts Senate as a part of the Cape and Islands District, which includes all of Cape Cod, Martha's Vineyard and Nantucket except the towns of Bourne, Falmouth, Sandwich and a portion of Barnstable. The town is patrolled by the Second (Yarmouth) Barracks of Troop D of the Massachusetts State Police.

On the national level, Brewster is a part of Massachusetts's 9th congressional district, and is currently represented by William Keating. The state's senior (Class II) member of the United States Senate, elected in 2012, is Elizabeth Warren. The junior (Class I) senator, elected in 2013, is Edward Markey.

Brewster is governed by the open town meeting form of government, led by an executive secretary and a board of selectmen. The town has its own police and fire departments. The fire department is located on Route 6A near the terminus of Route 137, while the police station is located about a half mile away on Route 124. There is a single post office near the geographic center of town, as well as the Brewster Ladies' Library, a 50,000-volume library which is a part of the Cape Libraries Automated Materials Sharing (CLAMS) library network. The Long Pond Medical Center, located just over the Harwich line at the intersection of Routes 6 and 137, serves the medical needs of the town, as well as the southeastern corner of the Cape.

== Education ==
Brewster is a member of the Nauset Regional School District, along with the towns of Eastham, Orleans and Wellfleet. The town operates the Stony Brook Elementary School, which serves students from kindergarten through second grade, and the Eddy Elementary School, which serves students in third through fifth grades. Middle school students typically attend Nauset Middle School in Orleans, although the Cape Cod Lighthouse Charter School in East Harwich is an alternative choice. High school students attend Nauset Regional High School in North Eastham.

Additionally, the town's high school students may attend Cape Cod Regional Technical High School in neighboring Harwich free of charge. There are also two private schools, The Family School and The Laurel School, both of which serve elementary students.

The Sea Pines School operated in town from 1907 to 1972.

See also: Brewster (CDP), Massachusetts

== Points of interest ==
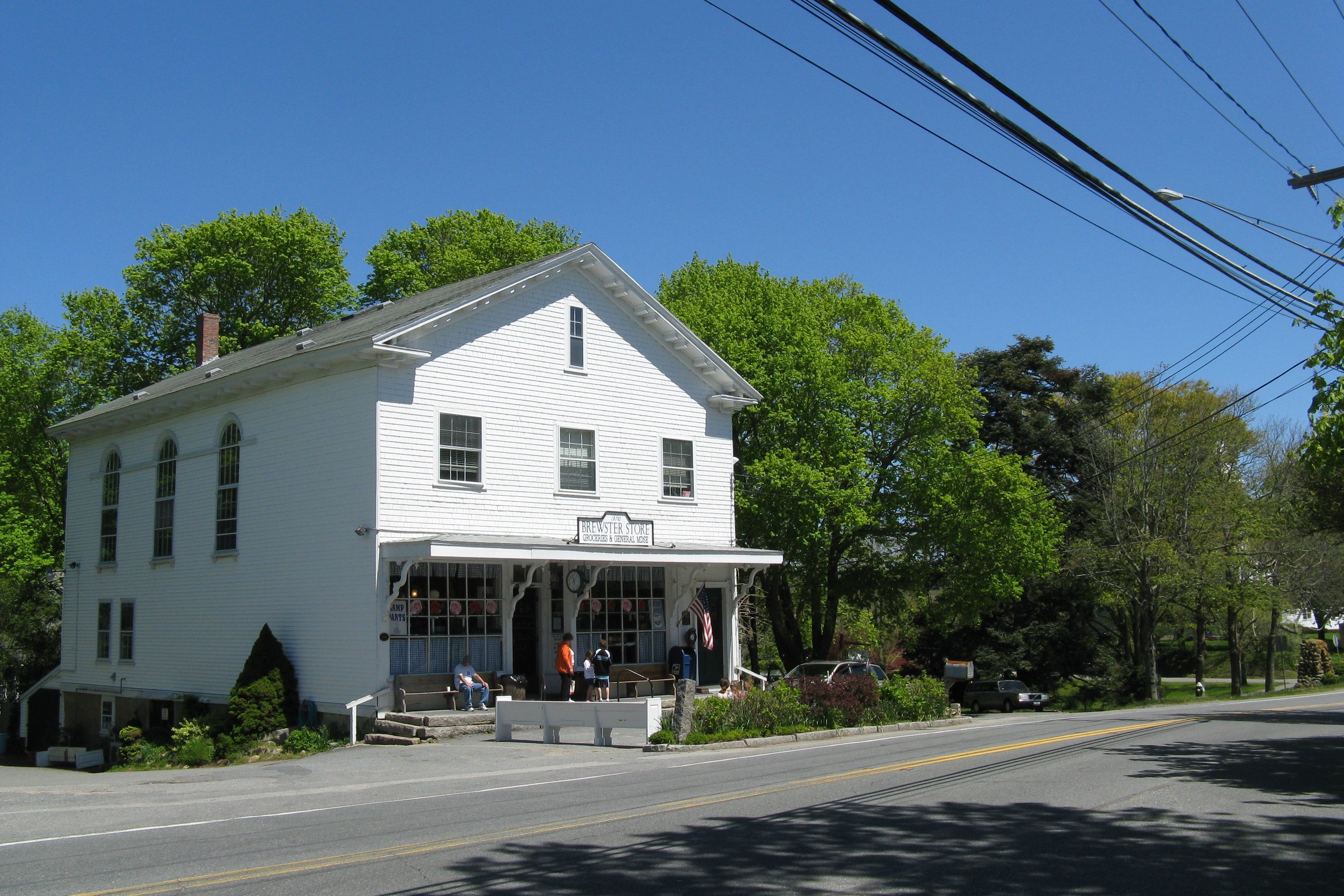
The Brewster Store

- Brewster Conservation Trust Walking Trails
- Brewster Historical Society Museum
- Brewster Ladies' Library
- Cape Cod Museum of Natural HIstory
- Factory Village
- First Parish Brewster
- Stony Brook Grist Mill
- Wing Island
- Nickerson State Park

== Sports and recreation ==
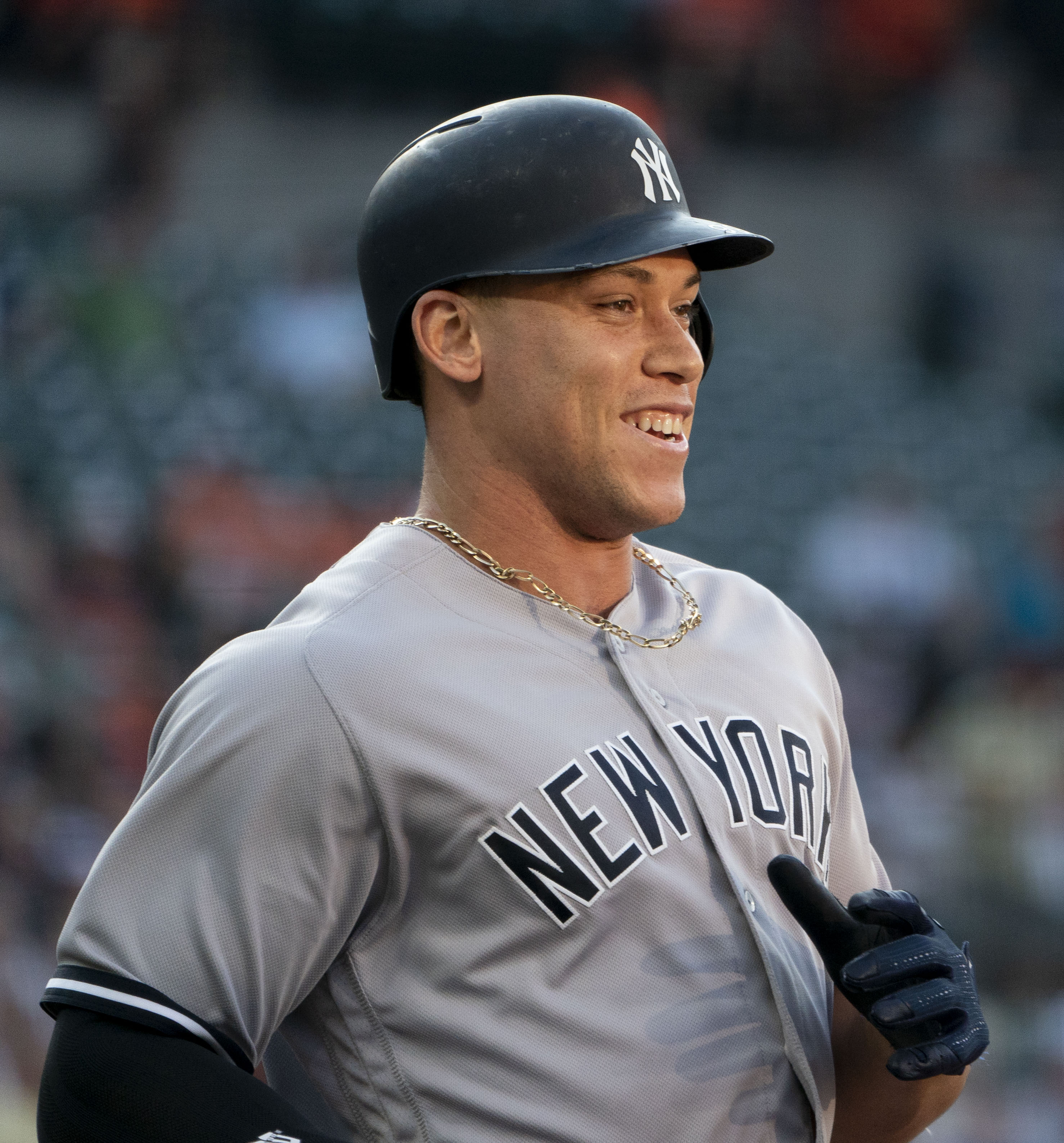
Aaron Judge played for the Brewster Whitecaps in 2012.

Brewster is home to the Brewster Whitecaps, an amateur collegiate summer baseball team in the Cape Cod Baseball League. The team plays at Stony Brook Field, and has featured dozens of players who went on to careers in Major League Baseball, such as Aaron Judge, Billy Wagner, and Chase Utley.

Brewster beaches, from east to west on the Cape Cod Bay are: Crosby Landing, Linnell Landing, Ellis Landing, Point of Rocks Landing, Breakwater Beach, Saint's Landing, Mant's Landing (Robbins Hill Beach), and Paines Creek Beach. In addition to the beaches on the northside, there are numerous important recreation areas in the town. The Drummer Boy Park on Route 6A has walking trails, picnic areas, playground, and an 18th-century windmill, the Old Higgins Farm Windmill, and blacksmith shop. Several hiking trails leave the Natural History museum, with the John Wing Trail going over a salt marsh boardwalk to Wing Island and the beach on Cape Cod Bay. At Nickerson State Park, there are 1,900 acres (770 ha) of open woodland, nearly 8 miles (13 km) of biking trails that can be hiked as well, and hiking trails around several ponds. Punkhorn Parklands also has thousands of acres of protected woodland with many hiking trails, the one to Eagle Point being particularly popular. Smaller conservation areas are available for hiking throughout the town.

== Notable associations ==
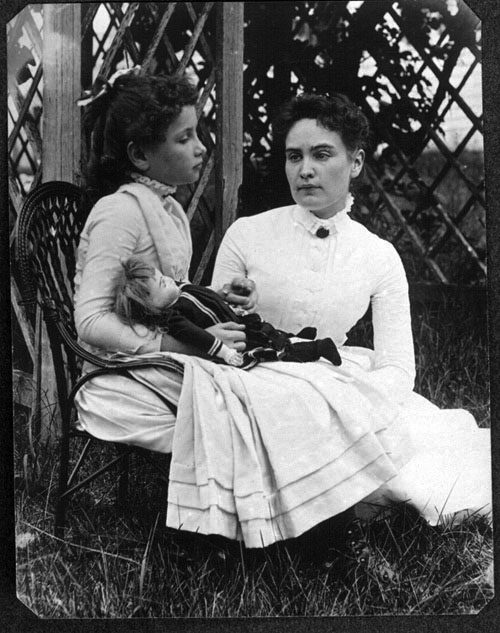
Helen Keller with Anne Sullivan in July 1888

In July 1888, Helen Keller and her teacher, Anne Sullivan, visited Brewster. In the photo, Helen is shown cradling a doll. The photograph was discovered almost 120 years after it was taken. The mother of the man who provided the photograph was Helen's playmate at the Elijah Cobb House.

Minnie Riperton's song "Alone in Brewster Bay" refers to when Riperton and her husband, producer Dick Rudolph, vacationed on Cape Cod during the early 1970s, prior to the release of her 1975 hit single, "Lovin' You".

Samuel M. Nickerson, president of the First National Bank of Chicago, was one of the most influential business leaders of the time. Nickerson's shares in First National Bank were sold for $2.1M, according to The New York Times dated September 29, 1899. The syndicate that purchased the shares included J. P. Morgan, E. H. Harriman and Marshall Field. The Nickerson summer house, Fieldstone Hall in Brewster, is now a condominium resort called Ocean Edge.

In a 2011 episode of Who Do You Think You Are?, Ashley Judd traced her direct lineage back to William Brewster, the town's namesake.
