= West Harwich, Massachusetts =

- Village
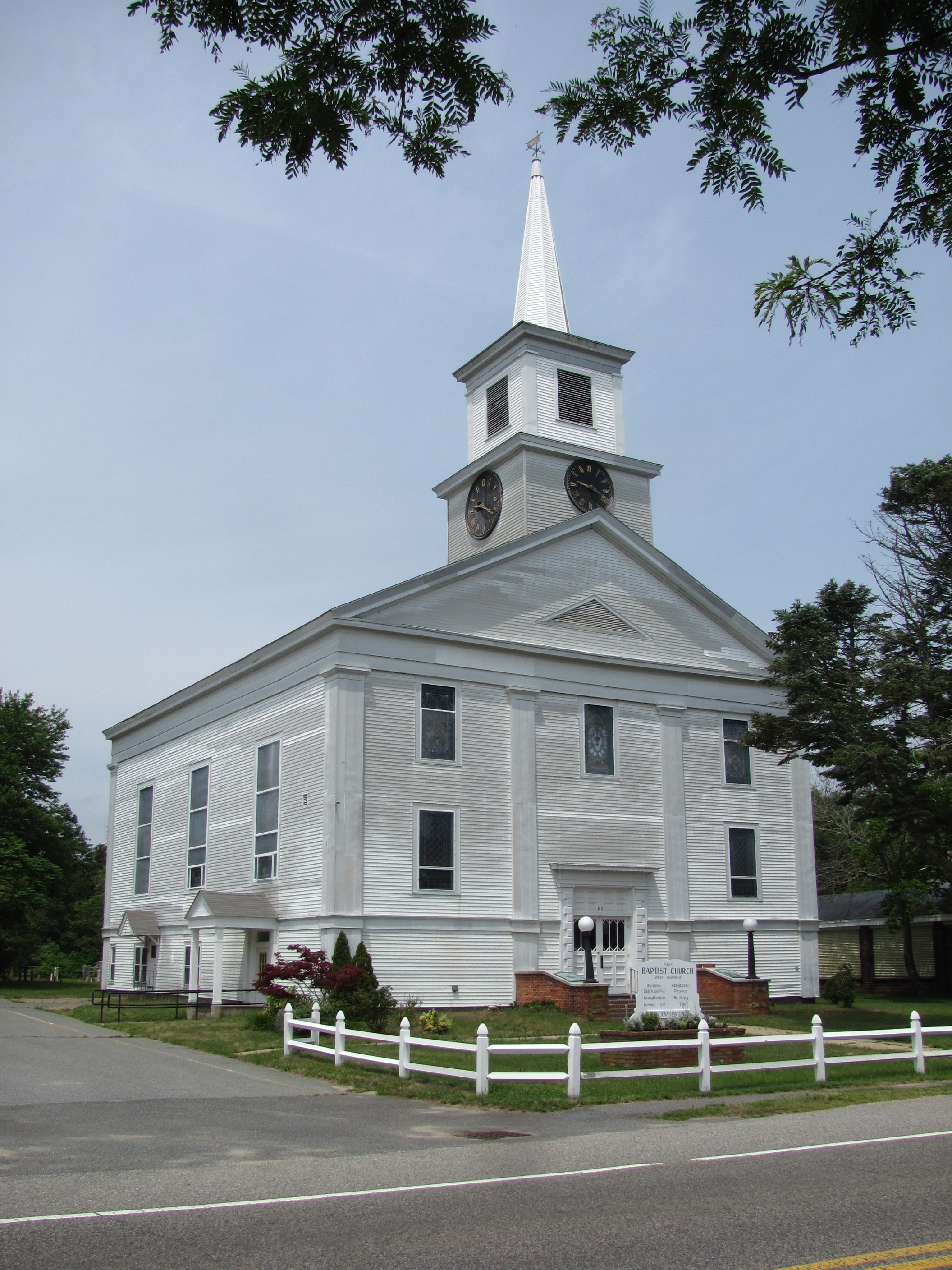
- First Baptist Church

- Location within Cape Cod
- Coordinates: 41°40′0″N 70°6′58″W
- Country: United States
- State: Massachusetts
- County: Barnstable
- Town: Harwich
- Elevation: 13 ft (4.0 m)
- Time zone: UTC-5 (Eastern (EST))
  - Summer (DST): UTC-4 (EDT)
- ZIP Code: 02671
- Area code: 508
- GNIS feature ID: 616014

West Harwich is a village in the town of Harwich, Massachusetts, on Cape Cod, United States. West Harwich makes most of the population in the Northwest Harwich Census-designated place.

== Geography and demographics ==
West Harwich is in the Northwest Harwich CDP. It is located on Massachusetts Route 28, a significant route on Cape Cod and in eastern Massachusetts. In the summer, West Harwich is a vacation area. In the other seasons, West Harwich is still very populated.

== Education ==
Harwich's schools are part of the Monomoy Regional School District. Harwich Elementary School serves students from preschool through fourth grade, and Monomoy Regional Middle School serves Harwich and the neighboring town, Chatham. This middle school serves grades 5–7, and Monomoy Regional High School serves grades 8–12 for Harwich and Chatham. Monomoy's teams are known as the Sharks. Harwich is known for its excellent boys' basketball, girls' basketball, girls' field hockey, softball, and baseball teams.

The Lighthouse Charter School is located in East Harwich, the former home of the Harwich Cinema.

Harwich is the site of Cape Cod Regional Technical High School, a grades 9–12 high school that serves most of Cape Cod. The town is also home to Holy Trinity Preschool, a Catholic preschool that serves pre-kindergarten in West Harwich.[22]

== Zip Code and CDP ==
West Harwich has its own Zip Code (02671); however, it is part of the Northwest Harwich CDP area, along with North Harwich and Pleasant Lake.
