= Harwich, Massachusetts =

- Town
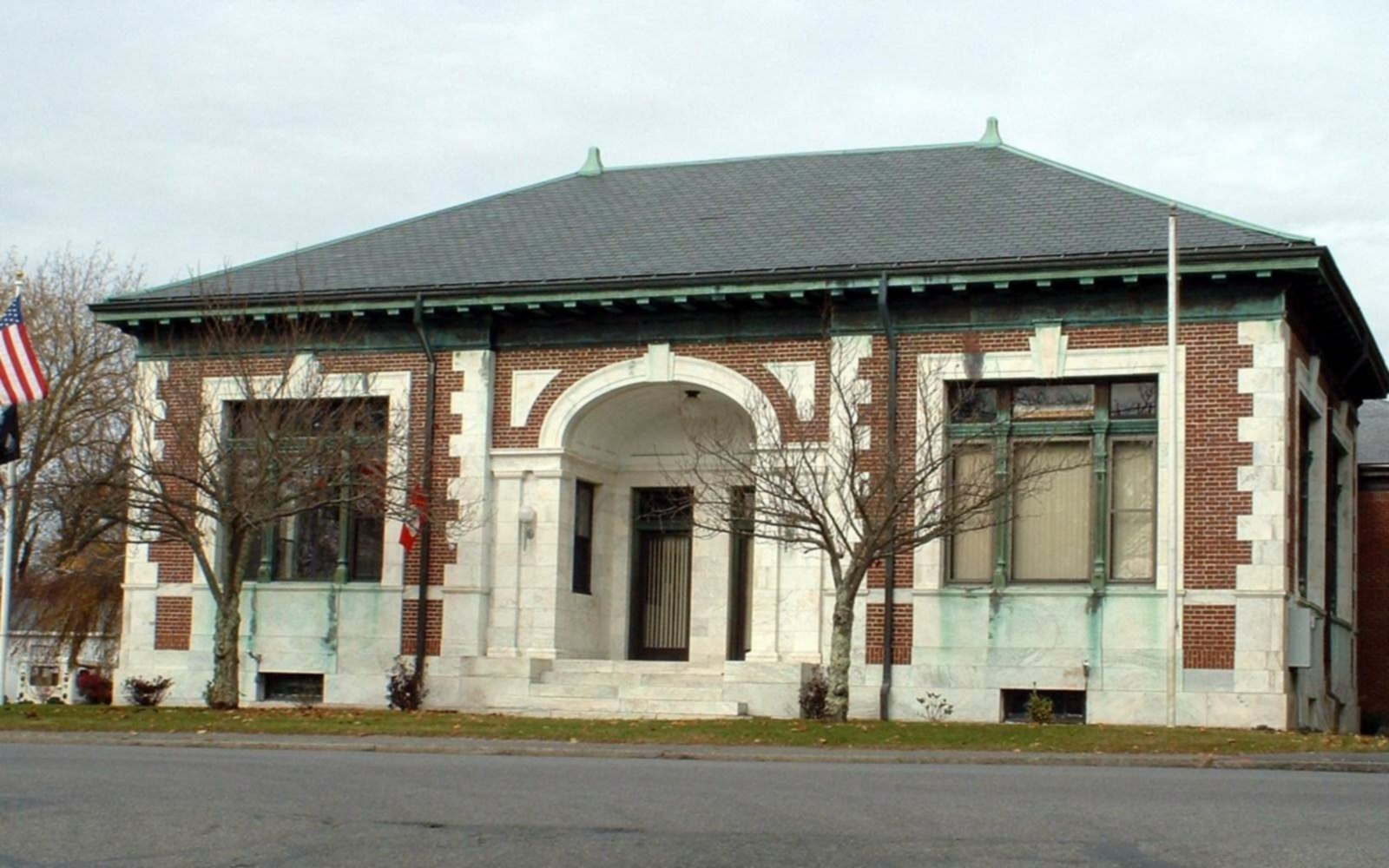
- Harwich Town Hall

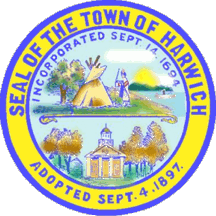
- Flag Seal

- Location in Barnstable County and Massachusetts.
- Coordinates: 41°41′10″N 70°04′35″W
- Country: United States
- State: Massachusetts
- County: Barnstable
- Settled: 1670
- Incorporated: 1694

Government
  - Type: Open town meeting
  - Town Administrator: Tony Schiavi

Area
  - Total: 33.1 sq mi (85.8 km^{2})
  - Land: 20.9 sq mi (54.1 km^{2})
  - Water: 12.2 sq mi (31.7 km^{2})
- Elevation: 56 ft (17 m)

Population (2020)
  - Total: 13,440
  - Density: 643/sq mi (248.4/km^{2})
- Time zone: UTC−5 (Eastern)
  - Summer (DST): UTC-4 (Eastern)
- ZIP Codes: 02645 (Harwich); 02646 (Harwich Port); 02671 (West Harwich)
- Area code: 508 / 774
- FIPS code: 25-29020
- GNIS feature ID: 0618254
- Website: www.harwich-ma.gov

Harwich (/ˈhɑːrwɪtʃ/ HAR-witch) is a town on Cape Cod in Massachusetts. At the 2020 census it had a population of 13,440. Harwich experiences a seasonal increase to roughly 37,000. The town is a popular vacation spot, located near the Cape Cod National Seashore. Harwich's beaches are on the Nantucket Sound side of Cape Cod. Harwich has three active harbors. Saquatucket, Wychmere and Allen Harbors are all in Harwich Port. The town of Harwich includes the villages of Pleasant Lake, West Harwich, East Harwich, Harwich Port, Harwich Center, North Harwich, Northwest Harwich, and South Harwich. It is named after the English town of Harwich.

== History ==
Harwich was first settled by Europeans in 1670 as part of Yarmouth. The town was officially incorporated in 1694, and originally included the lands of the current town of Brewster. Early industry involved fishing and farming. The town is considered by some to be the birthplace of the cranberry industry, with the first commercial operation opened in 1846. There are still many bogs in the town, although the economy is now more centered on tourism and as a residential community. The town is also the site of the start/finish line of the "Sail Around the Cape", which rounds the Cape counter-clockwise, returning via the Cape Cod Canal.

== Geography ==
According to the United States Census Bureau, the town has a total area of 33.1 square miles (85.8 km^{2}), of which 20.9 square miles (54.1 km^{2}) is land and 12.2 square miles (31.7 km^{2}), or 36.97%, is water. The seven villages of Harwich are West Harwich, North Harwich, East Harwich, South Harwich, Harwich Center, Harwich Port and Pleasant Lake. These are also referred to as the Harwiches.

Harwich is on the southern side of Cape Cod, just west of the southeastern corner. It is bordered by Dennis to the west, Brewster to the north, Orleans to the northeast, Chatham to the east, and Nantucket Sound to the south. Harwich is approximately 12 miles (19 km) east of Barnstable, 28 miles (45 km) east of the Cape Cod Canal, 35 miles (56 km) south of Provincetown, and 80 miles (130 km) southeast of Boston.

The town shares the largest lake on the Cape, called Long Pond, with the town of Brewster. Long Pond serves as a private airport for planes with the ability to land on water. The village of Pleasant Lake is at the southwest corner of the lake. Numerous other smaller bodies of water dot the town. Sand Pond, a public beach and swimming area, is located off Great Western Road in North Harwich.

The shore is home to several harbors and rivers, including the Herring River, Allens Harbor, Wychmere Harbor, Saquatucket Harbor, and the Andrews River. The town is also the home to the Hawksnest State Park, as well as a marina and several beaches, including two on Long Pond. There are also many beaches in West Harwich and South Harwich.

== Climate ==
According to the Köppen climate classification system, Harwich, Massachusetts, has a warm-summer, wet year round, humid continental climate (Dfb). Dfb climates are characterized by at least one month having an average mean temperature ≤ 32.0 °F (≤ 0.0 °C), at least four months with an average mean temperature ≥ 50.0 °F (≥ 10.0 °C), all months with an average mean temperature ≤ 71.6 °F (≤ 22.0 °C), and no significant precipitation difference between seasons. The average seasonal (Nov–Apr) snowfall total is approximately 30 inches (76 cm). The average snowiest month is February, which corresponds with the annual peak in nor'easter activity. The plant hardiness zone is 7a, with an average annual extreme minimum air temperature of 4.0 °F (−15.6 °C).

Climate data for Harwich, Barnstable County, Massachusetts (1981–2010 averages)
| Month | Jan | Feb | Mar | Apr | May | Jun | Jul | Aug | Sep | Oct | Nov | Dec | Year |
|---|---|---|---|---|---|---|---|---|---|---|---|---|---|
| Mean daily maximum °F (°C) | 37.8 (3.2) | 39.1 (3.9) | 44.2 (6.8) | 52.0 (11.1) | 61.3 (16.3) | 70.4 (21.3) | 76.9 (24.9) | 76.4 (24.7) | 70.3 (21.3) | 60.7 (15.9) | 52.6 (11.4) | 43.4 (6.3) | 57.2 (14.0) |
| Daily mean °F (°C) | 30.9 (−0.6) | 32.2 (0.1) | 37.4 (3.0) | 45.3 (7.4) | 54.4 (12.4) | 63.7 (17.6) | 70.2 (21.2) | 69.8 (21.0) | 63.5 (17.5) | 53.7 (12.1) | 45.7 (7.6) | 36.5 (2.5) | 50.4 (10.2) |
| Mean daily minimum °F (°C) | 23.9 (−4.5) | 25.2 (−3.8) | 30.5 (−0.8) | 38.6 (3.7) | 47.4 (8.6) | 57.1 (13.9) | 63.5 (17.5) | 63.2 (17.3) | 56.6 (13.7) | 46.8 (8.2) | 38.9 (3.8) | 29.6 (−1.3) | 43.5 (6.4) |
| Average precipitation inches (mm) | 3.80 (97) | 3.51 (89) | 4.61 (117) | 4.36 (111) | 3.49 (89) | 3.56 (90) | 3.13 (80) | 3.49 (89) | 3.71 (94) | 3.91 (99) | 4.09 (104) | 4.11 (104) | 45.77 (1,163) |
| Average relative humidity (%) | 71.6 | 70.0 | 68.0 | 71.1 | 73.5 | 77.1 | 79.6 | 79.6 | 78.5 | 75.4 | 72.0 | 71.0 | 74.0 |
| Average dew point °F (°C) | 22.8 (−5.1) | 23.5 (−4.7) | 27.8 (−2.3) | 36.5 (2.5) | 46.1 (7.8) | 56.4 (13.6) | 63.6 (17.6) | 63.2 (17.3) | 56.7 (13.7) | 46.1 (7.8) | 37.2 (2.9) | 28.0 (−2.2) | 42.4 (5.8) |
Source: PRISM Climate Group

== Ecology ==
According to the A. W. Kuchler U.S. potential natural vegetation types, Harwich, Massachusetts, would primarily contain a Northeastern oak/pine (110) vegetation type with a Southern mixed forest (26) vegetation form.

== Demographics ==
Historical population
| Year | Pop. | ±% |
|---|---|---|
| 1790 | 2,392 | — |
| 1850 | 3,258 | +36.2% |
| 1860 | 3,423 | +5.1% |
| 1870 | 3,080 | −10.0% |
| 1880 | 3,265 | +6.0% |
| 1890 | 2,734 | −16.3% |
| 1900 | 2,334 | −14.6% |
| 1910 | 2,115 | −9.4% |
| 1920 | 1,846 | −12.7% |
| 1930 | 2,329 | +26.2% |
| 1940 | 2,535 | +8.8% |
| 1950 | 2,649 | +4.5% |
| 1960 | 3,747 | +41.4% |
| 1970 | 5,892 | +57.2% |
| 1980 | 8,971 | +52.3% |
| 1990 | 10,275 | +14.5% |
| 2000 | 12,386 | +20.5% |
| 2010 | 12,243 | −1.2% |
| 2020 | 13,440 | +9.8% |
| 2023* | 13,595 | +1.2% |
* = population estimate. Source: United States census records and Population Estimates Program data.

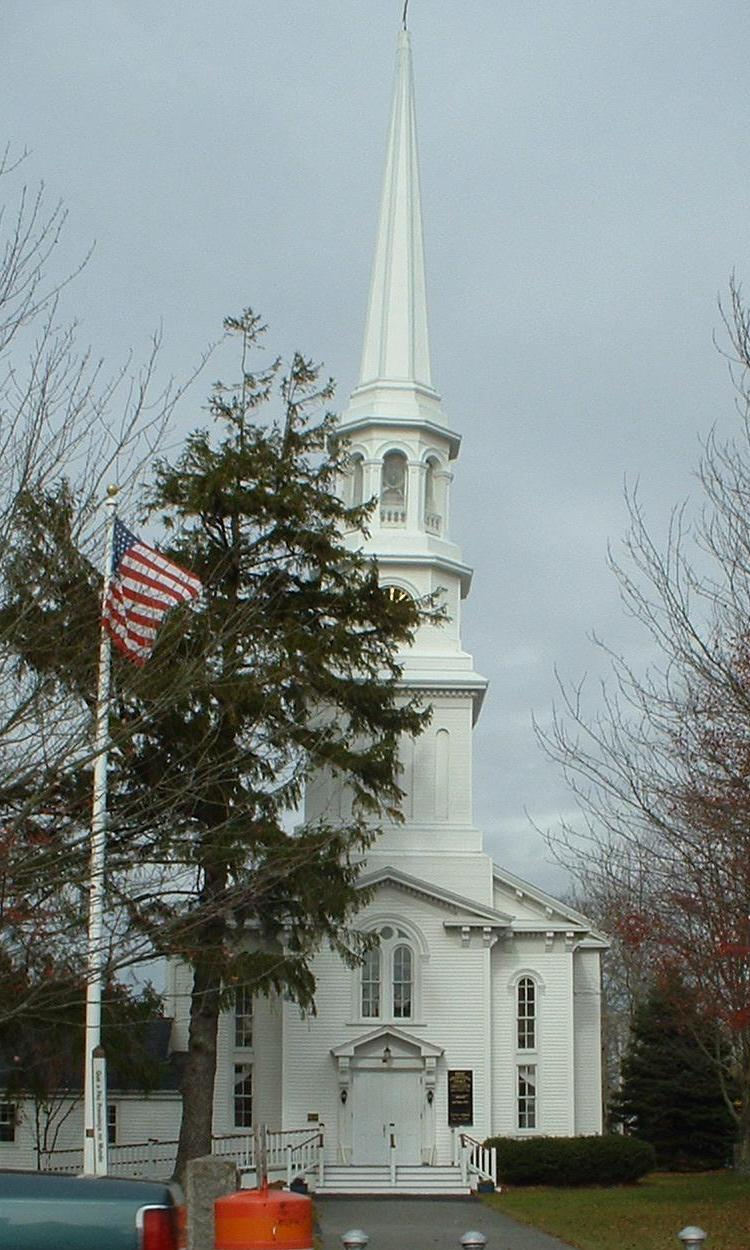
The First Congregational Church of Harwich, in Harwich Center

As of the census of 2000, there were 12,386 people, 5,471 households, and 3,545 families residing in the town. The population density was 588.6 inhabitants per square mile (227.3/km^{2}). There were 9,450 housing units at an average density of 449.1 per square mile (173.4/km^{2}). The racial makeup of the town was 95.41% White, 0.71% Black or African American, 0.19% Native American, 0.22% Asian, 0.05% Pacific Islander, 2.03% from other races, and 1.40% from two or more races. 0.96% of the population were Hispanic or Latino of any race.

There were 5,471 households, out of which 21.3% had children under the age of 18 living with them, 53.4% were married couples living together, 9.0% had a female householder with no husband present, and 35.2% were non-families. 29.8% of all households were made up of individuals, and 16.9% had someone living alone who was 65 years of age or older. The average household size was 2.20 and the average family size was 2.72.

In the town, the population was spread out, with 18.3% under the age of 18, 4.2% from 18 to 24, 22.1% from 25 to 44, 25.8% from 45 to 64, and 29.6% who were 65 years of age or older. The median age was 49 years. For every 100 females, there were 84.5 males. For every 100 females age 18 and over, there were 79.7 males.

The median income for a household in the town was $41,552, and the median income for a family was $82,070. Males had a median income of $38,948 versus $27,439 for females. The per capita income for the town was $23,063. About 2.9% of families and 15.5% of the population were below the poverty line, including 8.4% of those under age 18 and 8.1% of those age 65 or over.

The town of Harwich contains several smaller census-designated places (CDPs) for which the U.S. Census reports more focused geographic and demographic information. The CDPs in Harwich are Harwich Center, Harwich Port (including South Harwich), East Harwich and Northwest Harwich (including West Harwich, North Harwich, and Pleasant Lake).

== Government ==
Harwich is represented in the Massachusetts House of Representatives as a part of the Fourth Barnstable district, which includes (with the exception of Brewster) all the towns east and north of Harwich on the Cape. The town is represented in the Massachusetts Senate as a part of the Cape and Islands District, which includes all of Cape Cod, Martha's Vineyard and Nantucket except the towns of Bourne, Falmouth, Sandwich and a portion of Barnstable. The town is patrolled by the Second (Yarmouth) Barracks of Troop D of the Massachusetts State Police.

After results from the 2020 census, Massachusetts decreased from 10 to 9 congressional districts due to decreased growth in population. These new boundaries now put Harwich in the 9th congressional district as the 10th no longer exists. Harwich is currently represented by William R. Keating. The state's senior member of the United States Senate is Elizabeth Warren, elected in 2012. The junior senator is Ed Markey, elected in 2013.

Harwich is governed by the open town meeting form of government, led by a town administrator and a board of selectmen.

== Public and health services ==
There are three libraries in the town. The municipal library, the Brooks Free Library in Harwich Center, is the largest and is a member of the Cape Libraries Automated Materials Sharing (CLAMS) library network. There are two smaller non-municipal libraries – the Chase Library on Route 28 in West Harwich at the Dennis town line, and the Harwich Port Library on Lower Bank Street in Harwich Port.

Harwich is the site of the Long Pond Medical Center, which serves the southeastern Cape region.

Harwich has police and fire departments, with one fire and police station headquarters, and Station 2 in East Harwich.

There are post offices in Harwich Port, South Harwich, West Harwich, and East Harwich.

== Education ==
Harwich's schools are part of the Monomoy Regional School District. Harwich Elementary School serves students from pre-school through fourth grade, Monomoy Regional Middle School which serves both Harwich and its joining town, Chatham. This middle school serves grades 5–7, and Monomoy Regional High School serves grades 8–12 for both Harwich and Chatham. Monomoy's teams are known as the Sharks. Harwich is known for its excellent boys basketball, girls basketball, girls field hockey, softball and baseball teams.

The Lighthouse Charter School recently moved into where the Harwich Cinema building was located.

Harwich is the site of Cape Cod Regional Technical High School, a grades 9–12 high school which serves most of Cape Cod. The town is also home to Holy Trinity PreSchool, a Catholic pre-school which serves pre-kindergarten in West Harwich.

== Sports and recreation ==
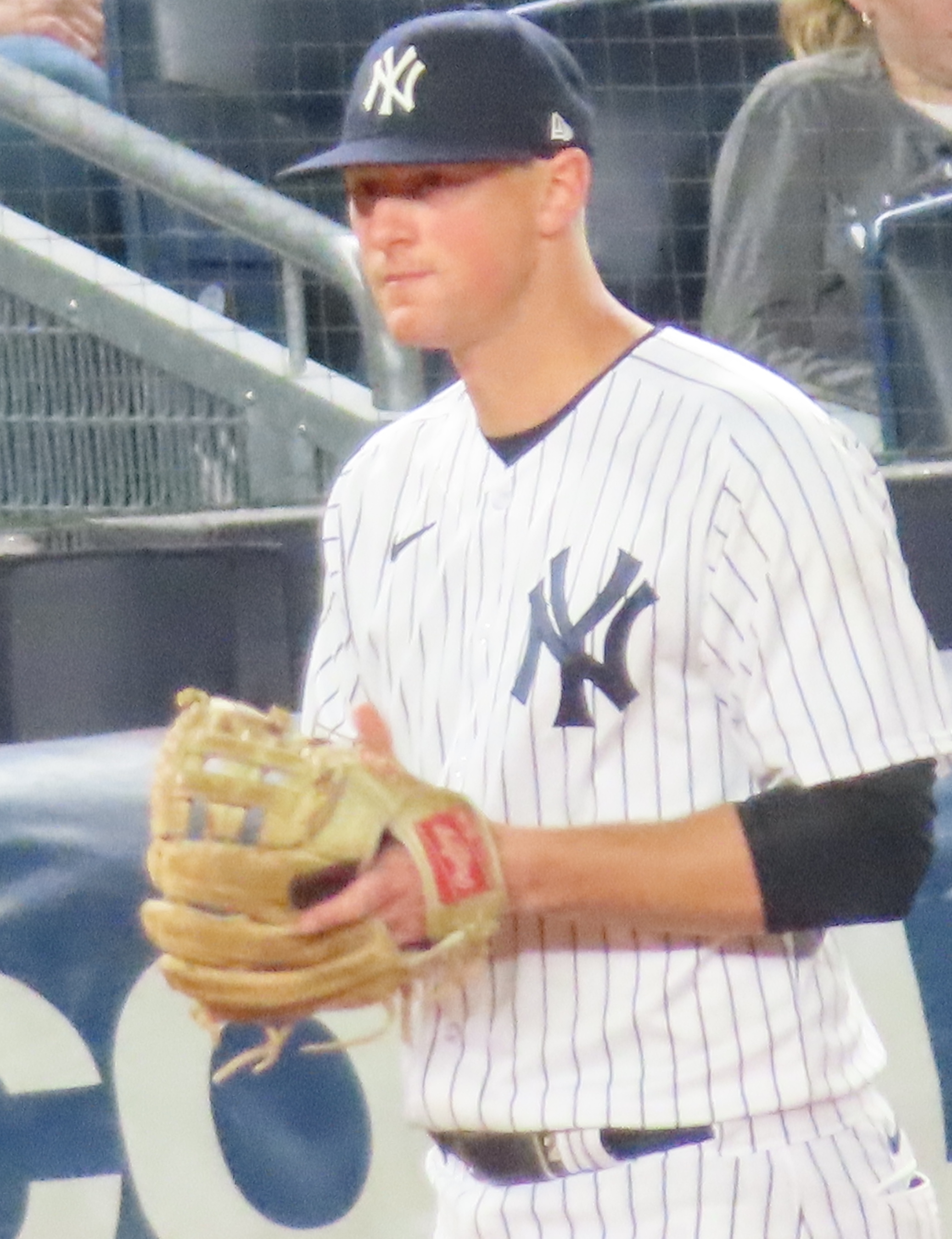
DJ LeMahieu played for the Harwich Mariners in 2008.

Harwich is home to the Harwich Mariners, an amateur collegiate summer baseball team in the Cape Cod Baseball League. The team plays at B.F.C. Whitehouse Field and has featured dozens of players who went on to careers in Major League Baseball such as Kevin Millar, Josh Donaldson, and DJ LeMahieu.

Since 1976, the town has hosted the annual Harwich Cranberry Festival, noted for its fireworks display, in September.

Harwich Port is a popular destination in the summer. The most popular beach in Harwich Port is Bank Street Beach. Harwich has 18 beaches and ponds.

== Transportation ==
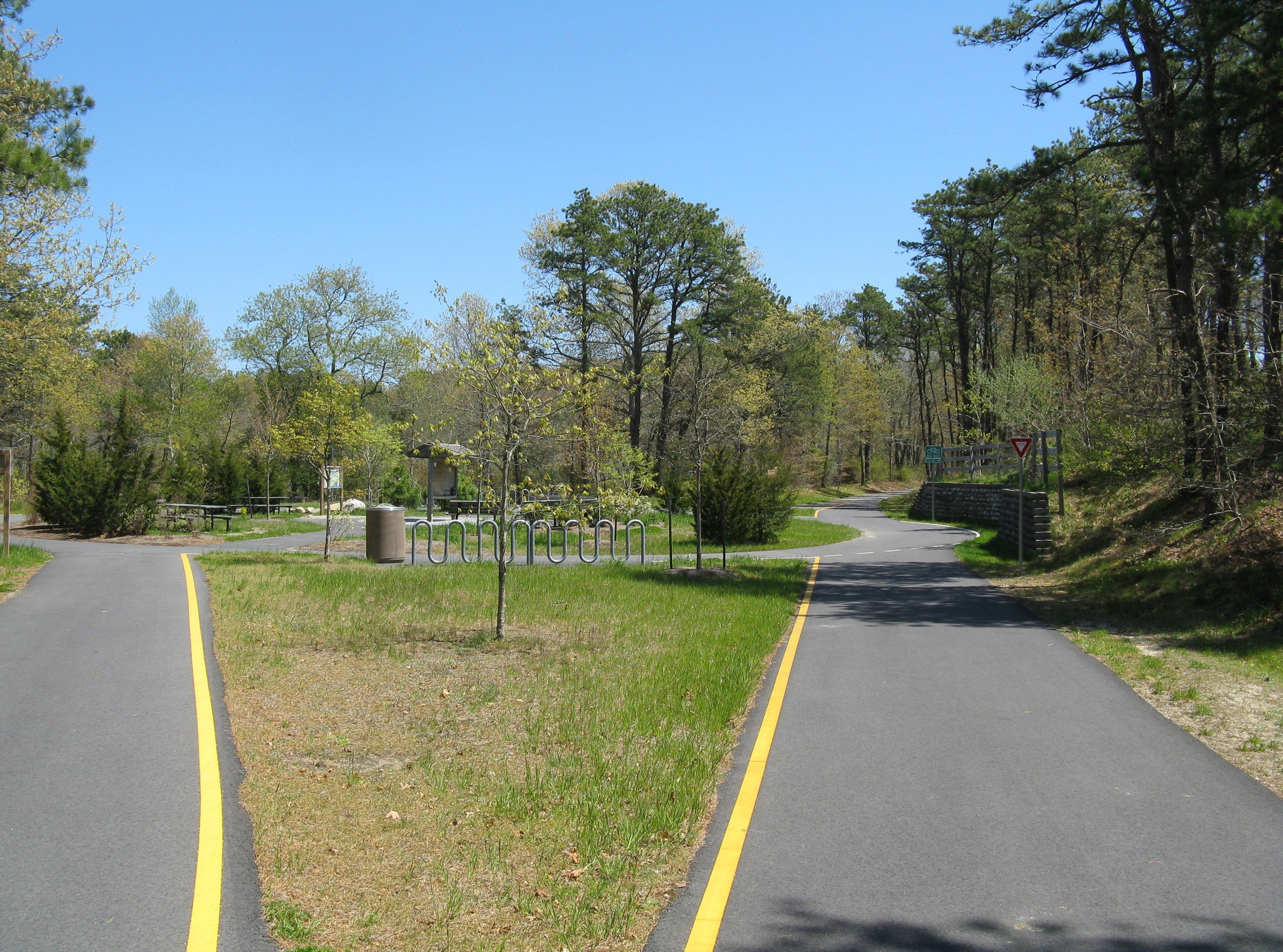
Cape Cod Rail Trail Rotary

=== Roadways ===
Two of Massachusetts major routes, U.S. Route 6 and Massachusetts Route 28, cross the town. The town has the southern termini of Routes 39 and 124, and a portion of Route 137 passes through the town. Route 39 leads east through East Harwich to Orleans. Route 28 passes through West Harwich and Harwich Port, connecting the towns of Dennis and Chatham. Route 124 leads from Harwich Center to Brewster, and Route 137 cuts through East Harwich leading from Chatham to Brewster.

=== Cape Cod Rail Trail ===
A portion of the Cape Cod Rail Trail, as well as several other bicycle routes, are in town. There is no rail service in town, but the Cape Cod Rail Trail rotary is located in North Harwich near Main Street.

=== Air travel ===
Other than the occasional sea plane landing on the pond, the nearest airport is in neighboring Chatham; the nearest regional service is at Barnstable Municipal Airport; and the nearest national and international air service is at Logan International Airport in Boston.

=== CCRTA bus connections ===
In recent years parts of Cape Cod have introduced bus service, especially during the summer to help cut down on traffic.

- The Flex Harwich Port – West Harwich – Dennis Port – South Dennis – East Dennis – South Yarmouth – West Yarmouth – Hyannis
- Route H2O Hyannis – Orleans via South Dennis, West Dennis, Dennis Port, Harwich Port, Chatham and Orleans.

== Notable people ==
- Ruby Braff (1927–2003), jazz trumpeter and cornetist, former resident of Harwich in his later life
- A. Elmer Crowell (1862–1952), was a master decoy carver from East Harwich. Crowell specialized in shorebirds, waterfowl, and miniatures. Crowell's decoys are consistently regarded as the finest and most desirable decoys ever made. Two of Crowell's decoys have repeatedly set world records for sales. Currently, Crowell's preening pintail drake and Canada goose decoys share the world record at $1.13 million
- Seth Doane, award-winning television journalist; raised in Harwich and graduate of Harwich High School
- Shawn Fanning, creator and owner of MP3 music downloading application Napster; graduated from Harwich High School
- John Kendrick (1740–1794), maritime fur trader; one of the first Americans to visit the Pacific Northwest, the Hawaiian Islands, and China
- Thomas Nickerson, survivor of the ill-fated whaleship Essex, which inspired Melville's novel Moby Dick
- Tip O'Neill (1912–1994), politician; owned a vacation home near Bank Street Beach and buried in Mount Pleasant Cemetery
- Andrea Silbert, nonprofit executive
- Fay Vincent, commissioner of Major League Baseball
- Jonathan Walker (1799–1878), abolitionist; had his hand branded as a consequence of helping free slaves
- Joseph N. Welch, chief counsel for the United States Army; famously asked Senator Joseph McCarthy "At long last, have you left no sense of decency?"

== Notable events ==
- In 1975, during the bicentennial celebrations across America, a time capsule was buried in front of Brooks Academy in Harwich Center. The time capsule is due to be opened in 100 years, in the year 2075.
- On September 14, 1994, the town celebrated its tricentennial, which marked 300 years since the town's founding on the same day in 1694.
