= South Harwich, Massachusetts =

- Village
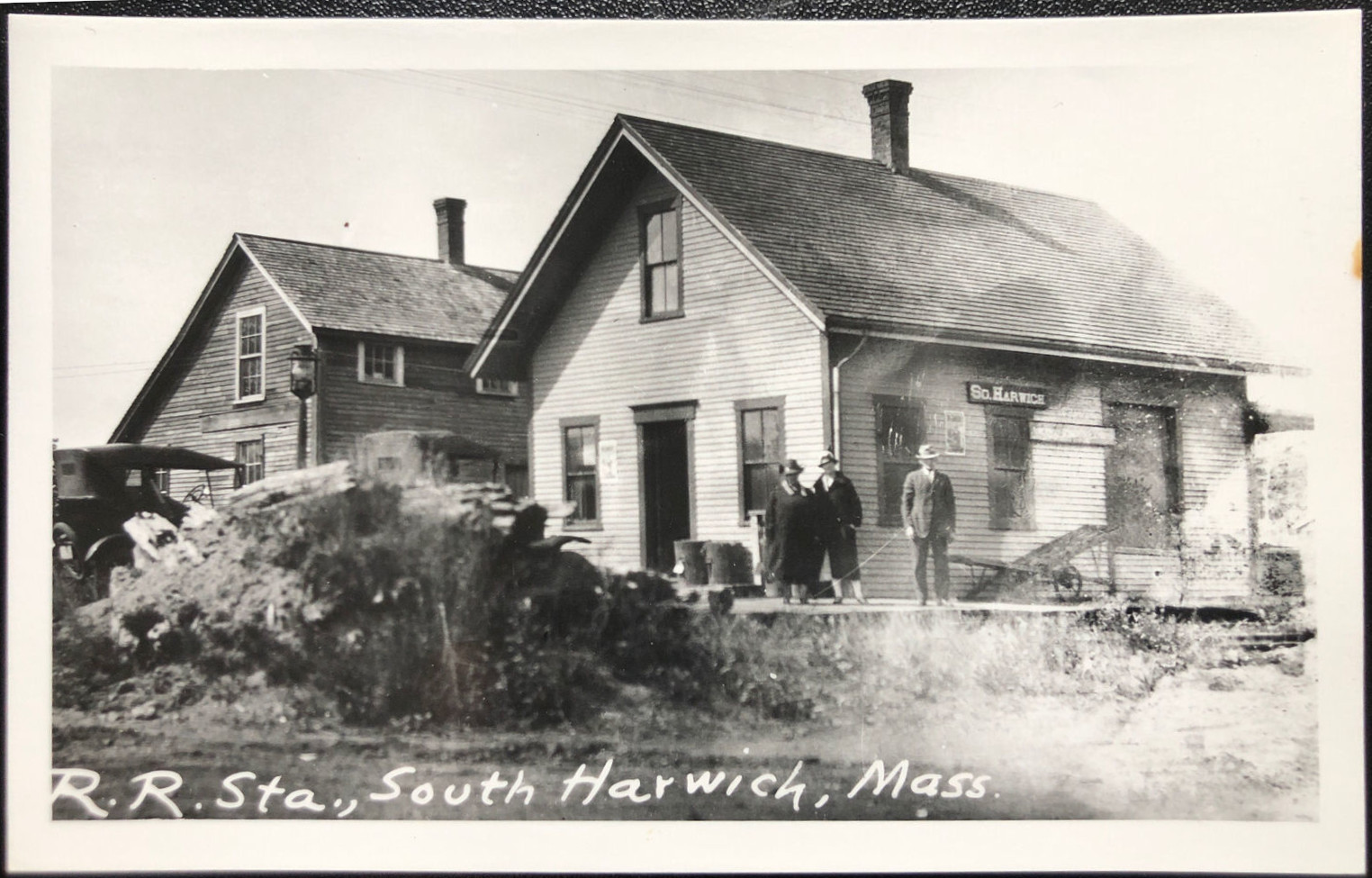
- South Harwich station

- Location within Cape Cod
- Coordinates: 41°40′30″N 70°02′38″W
- Country: United States
- State: Massachusetts
- County: Barnstable
- Town: Harwich
- Elevation: 16 ft (4.9 m)
- Time zone: UTC-5 (Eastern (EST))
  - Summer (DST): UTC-4 (EDT)
- ZIP Code: 02661
- GNIS feature ID: 615998

South Harwich is a village of Harwich in Barnstable County, Massachusetts, United States and is located within the Harwich Port Census-designated place. South Harwich is home to much history and attractions, such as the South Harwich meeting house or the Red River Beach.
