= Harwich High School =

Defunct school in Massachusetts, U.S.

Coordinates: 41°41′29.9″N 70°4′4.2″W

- 75 Oak Street, Harwich Center, Massachusetts; United States

Information
- Type: Public
- Established: 1964
- Closed: 2014
- Principal: Kevin Turner
- Grades: 9–12
- Enrollment: 375
- Campus: Suburban
- Colors: Blue, Gold & White
- Teams: Rough Riders
- Newspaper: The Rough Rider Review

Harwich High School was a public high school located in Harwich, Massachusetts, United States. Harwich High School was the third smallest public high school on Cape Cod. Harwich High School closed in 2013-2014 due to the towns of Harwich and Chatham deciding to regionalize their school districts and build a regional high school. The new high school is Monomoy Regional High School, which opened in 2014.

== Overview ==
Harwich High School had an approximate enrollment of 400 students in grades 9–12. The school's mascot is the Rough Rider and its colors are Blue, Gold, and White.

- Over the past couple of years, Harwich had been in negotiations with the town of Chatham to create a regionalized school district due to declining student populations in each town. If the plan is approved, Harwich and Chatham will send its student populations to separate elementary schools within the towns, and what is now the Chatham High School and Middle School would become the town's middle school. Students from both towns will go to a new building in Harwich which would be the regional high school. This is because of the inefficient space in the schools and the deteriorating condition of Harwich High School, and the lack of proper funding to build a new Harwich High School. The new name of the school district would be the Monomoy School District. Harwich originally planned to merge with the towns of Dennis and Yarmouth and join the Dennis-Yarmouth Regional School District, but that plan was decided not to work. However, if the Chatham plan does not work then Harwich may have no choice but to merge with Dennis and Yarmouth and/or become a 7–12 high school.
- In January 2011, the school board voted unanimously to approve the regionalization of Harwich and Chatham. Plans are currently being made to build a new school, location of the school, naming of the new regional high school, and how soon the regionalization will take effect. Most likely, the regional school district plan will take effect in 2013.
- The regional school district was named Monomoy Regional School District in the spring of 2011
- The school systems are deciding to join the School's 8th Grade class with the regionalized school district. The first class to graduate under the name of the Monomoy Regional School District is the Class of 2013. However, rumors are spreading about whether they plan to petition to be named under the original Harwich High School, and postpone the naming for 1 year.

== Sports ==
- Baseball

Harwich was notable for having an outstanding baseball team. The baseball team won the Division 3 State Championship in 1996, 2006, and 2007, under the helm of legendary Massachusetts Hall of Fame coach Fred Thacher. Harwich played at Whitehouse Field, which is a first class baseball park which is also home to the Harwich Mariners of the Cape Cod Baseball League. It has also hosted the NCAA Division 3 New England Regional Championships on numerous occasions. Harwich also had sent numerous players to prestigious schools for baseball including Boston College, Vanderbilt, Wheaton, UMass Amherst, South Florida, and George Mason. Harwich currently has two baseball alumni in the Major Leagues, Cody Crowell and Ryan Soares. The Rough Riders reached the Division IV South Sectional Finals in 2010, only to lose to Cohasset by a score of 6–1. Cohasset eventually went on to with the State Championship that year. During the 2012 baseball season, the last season of Harwich being its own baseball team before they regionalize with Chatham and become Monomoy Regional in 2013, they won the Division IV South Sectional Championship, and eventually reached the Massachusetts Division IV State Championship. However, Harwich was eventually defeated by Georgetown by a score of 11–1.

- Boys Basketball

The Harwich boys basketball team was the best in Southern Massachusetts from 1988 to 1991. They went to the state semifinals two of those years, led by Ricky Roderick and Chadd Kodak. After the players' departure, the program declined quickly.

- Field Hockey

Harwich's field hockey team was one of the most consistent and dominant teams in not only Massachusetts, but also in New England. In the past 10 years, Harwich has lost just two league games and has been the #1 seed in the Massachusetts State Tournament 6 times. They have had 3 undefeated seasons in the past 6 years. In 2009, the team amassed 96 goals for the season while only allowing 6 goals the whole season.

- Football

Harwich had a longstanding co-op football team with Cape Cod Regional Technical High School, until 2009, when the Massachusetts Interscholastic Athletic Association disbanded the co-op stating both schools had enough players to field separate teams. The football team has made it to the Massachusetts State Championship game twice; in 2000 and 2006. In 2000, the football team rolled through the regular season and secured a playoff berth. They were ultimately defeated by powerhouse Georgetown in the championship game, 26–6. In 2006, the football team rolled to a 9–1 regular season record, on the shoulders of Massachusetts Division 3A Player of the Year, James Hamilton, who ran for well over 2,000 yards and 37 touchdowns on the season. Their lone regular season loss came at the hands of Mashpee on Thanksgiving Day. The Crusaders played West Roxbury in the first round, defeating them 35–27 and clinched a spot in the Division 3A State Championship game, which they lost 7–0 to Ipswich.

- Girls Basketball

The girls basketball team was a powerhouse in the early part of the decade. They won back-to-back State Titles in 2003 and 2004 on the back of standout player, Sharee Daluze.

== Problems ==
In 2007 the New England Association of Schools and Colleges had placed Harwich High in its warning category, describing the school as unable to support 21st Century education. The primary reason for the warning was due simply to the age of the building and the outdated systems and infrastructure. The new regional high school will easily rectify the situation with a design based on a model school, such as Ashland High School in Ashland, Massachusetts. The school supports 21st Century Education by incorporating current technology into the design of the building.

== Notable alumni ==
- Shawn Fanning - Class of 1998, Creator of MP3 downloading system, Napster.
