= Harwich Port =

Harwich Port may refer to:

- Harwich Port, Massachusetts, a beach resort in the U.S. state of Massachusetts
- Harwich International Port, a North Sea seaport in Essex, England
