= Seth Doane =

American television journalist

Seth Wiley Doane
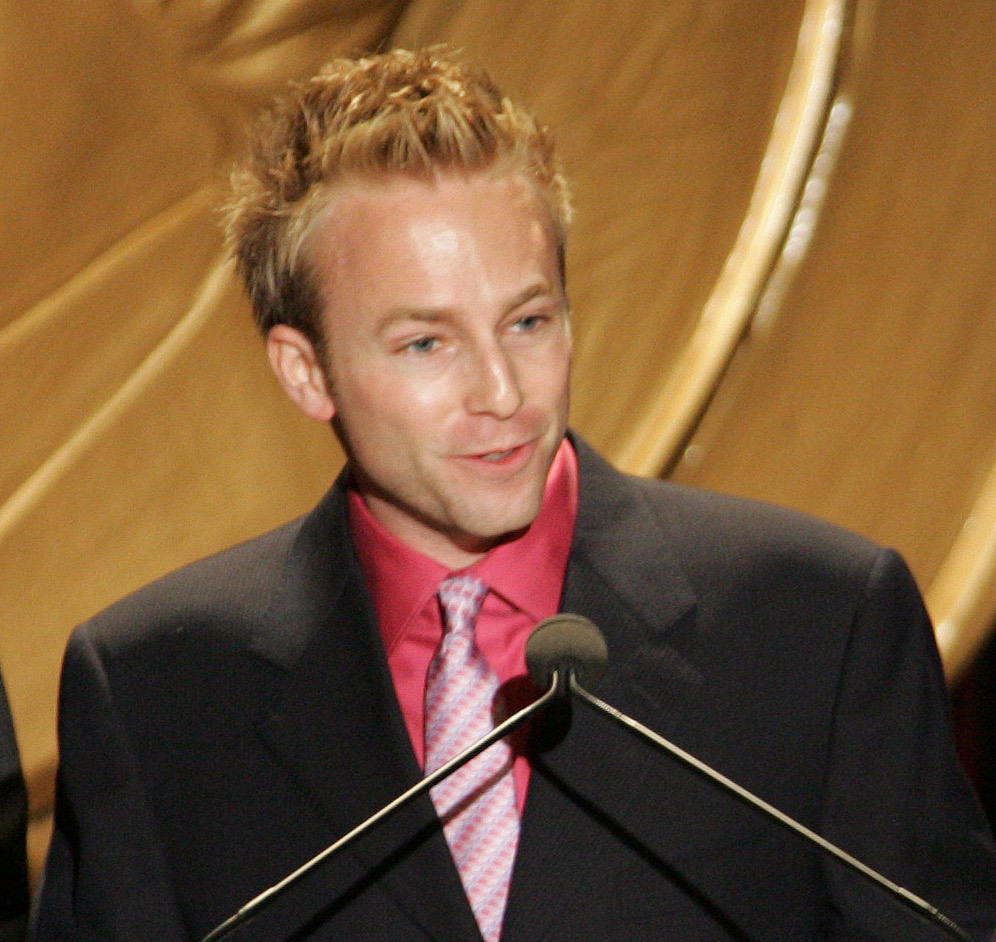
- Doane accepting Peabody Award in 2005
- Education: Harwich High School; University of Southern California (BA)
- Occupation: Broadcast journalist
- Employers: WNYW-TV (2000–2001); Channel One News (2001–2006); CNN International (2006–2007); CBS News (2007–present)
- Notable work: The Other America (CBS Evening News); A Sunday Morning In Florence; The Suffering of Sudan (Channel One News); 60 Minutes + / 60 Minutes: A Second Look
- Spouse: Andrea Pastorelli (m. 2014)
- Website: CNN Programs - Anchors/Reporters - Seth Doane at the Wayback Machine (archived March 20, 2007)

Seth Doane is an American television journalist, working for CBS News.

== Career ==
Doane is a Peabody and multiple Emmy Award winning Senior Foreign Correspondent for CBS News. The Italy-based correspondent reports primarily for CBS' "Sunday Morning" the #1 rated Sunday morning news program in America.

Doane had been a regular contributor to CBS Sunday Morning, and his role as a correspondent was formalized in early 2020 as announced by CBS News. CBS Sunday Morning executive producer, Rand Morrison, said "Seth is a superb fit for "Sunday Morning". His reporting is smart and sensitive - and he brings a signature style to every story he does."

A few years ago, he was also named correspondent for 60 in 6, a new 60 Minutes streaming program. "Seth has covered some of the most important stories of the last decade, and I can't wait for him to start reporting for '60 in 6'", 60 Minutes Executive Producer Bill Owens said in March 2020 when CBS made the announcement.

In 2024, it was announced by CBS News that Doane would also host a new '60 Minutes' podcast called, "60 Minutes: A Second Look". In an interview published by The Hollywood Reporter, 60 Minutes EP Bill Owens was quoted as saying, "Seth Doane is one of the best journalists at CBS News. He's a big fan of 60 Minutes, and I'm sure one day he'll work at 60 Minutes."

He won an Emmy in 2025 for his story "Face to Face", in which Doane and his team (including producer Sari Aviv, editor Ed Givnish, cameraman David Cohen) profiled the work of "Combatants for Peace" a group centered around former Israeli and Palestinian fighters who unite for peace. Doane was part of the team at CBS News Sunday Morning to be awarded the 2020 News Emmy Award for "Outstanding News Special" for a special broadcast from Florence, Italy, "A Sunday Morning In Florence". The Rome, Italy based Doane contributed three separate pieces to the Emmy award-winning broadcast.

Doane began his career at WNYW, New York City's Fox affiliate, as a field producer. Channel One News, the high-school TV network, then made him a news anchor, sending him abroad to cover stories in San Salvador, Indonesia, Iran, Afghanistan, and the Sudan.

In April 2006 CNN hired Doane as a special video news correspondent for South Asia, including India. He remained with CNN, based in New Delhi, until June 2007.

In August 2007, Doane became a national correspondent for CBS News, covering domestic issues. In 2008 he began reporting a segment titled "The Other America" on the effects of the economic recession on individual people and families. Doane is also a frequent correspondent for CBS News Sunday Morning.

From April 2013 until March 2016, Doane was based in Beijing, China, covering events in Asia for CBS News. Since April 2016, he has been based in Rome and covering Europe, Africa, and the Middle East for CBS News. On September 6, 2014, Doane married Andrea Pastorelli in a same-sex civil ceremony in Arezzo, Italy at the Villa Rosa Badia Di Campoleone.

In March 2020, Doane tested positive for COVID-19. He was one of the first news correspondents to go public and told Gayle King on CBS This Morning he did so to raise awareness, combat stigma and help people recognize symptoms.

== Childhood ==
Seth Doane is a 12th generational Cape Codder. The detail was revealed in a story for CBS which profiled his father, Paul Doane a former Republican State Senator who represented "Cape Cod and the Islands" in Massachusetts. The story was about his father's hobby, oyster fishing in Wellfleet.

== Noteworthy Interviews ==
Doane has interviewed a number of high profile figures over the years in his role as correspondent for CBS' Sunday Morning. Interviews of note include:

- Paul McCartney in London
- Whoopi Goldberg at her home on the Italian island of Sardinia, a retreat for her which, as she explains to Doane, "Lots of people just need some place they can go and just 'Aaaaaaaaah’
- Matt Damon in Marseilles, France where the actor shot "Stillwater"
- Michelle Yeoh in France ahead of her Oscar win for "Everything Everywhere All At Once"
- Jane Goodall at her childhood home in Bournemouth, England
- Pop star Ed Sheeran near his home in England and on-stage before a performance in Brooklyn
- Actor Paul Mescal at his alma mater in Dublin, Ireland
- Russell Crowe in 2015 at his home in Australia
- Wicked star Cynthia Erivo
- Cate Blanchett on her role in Tar at Abbey Road Studios in London
- The Dalai Lama
- Prince Harry who reflected on his grandmother Queen Elizabeth II talking with Doane at a polo field in Brazil
- Discussing the future of Broadway with composer Andrew Lloyd Webber
- Famed Italian tenor Andrea Bocelli at home with his family in Italy
- On set in Vancouver with Marcia Gay Harden
- On Broadway talking with Mia Farrow and Patti LuPone as they rehearsed for "The Roommate"
- British clothing designer Sir Paul Smith about his career and creative process
- Academy Award winner Tilda Swinton in Paris about being shy and the influence of director Derek Jarman on her work
- Keri Russell behind the scenes of "The Diplomat"
- Rami Malek in London on being an outsider has informed his career choices
- Actor Sophia Loren on working with her son in "The Life Ahead"
- He was backstage at London's BST Hyde Park concert with singer-songwriter Yusuf/Cat Stevens
- A rare interview at the Annecy Festival in France with Matt Groening who created "The Simpsons”
- ABBA creators at the island home of Björn Ulvaeus in Sweden and sitting at the piano in Stockholm with Benny Andersson who explained how he came up with the music for "Dancing Queen"
