= Northwest Harwich, Massachusetts =

Northwest Harwich
- Census-designated place
- Location in Barnstable County and the state of Massachusetts.
- Coordinates: 41°41′25″N 70°6′9″W
- Country: United States
- State: Massachusetts
- County: Barnstable
- Town: Harwich

Area
  - Total: 9.15 sq mi (23.71 km^{2})
  - Land: 7.98 sq mi (20.68 km^{2})
  - Water: 1.17 sq mi (3.03 km^{2})
- Elevation: 26 ft (7.9 m)

Population (2020)
  - Total: 4,296
  - Density: 538.2/sq mi (207.79/km^{2})
- Time zone: UTC-5 (Eastern (EST))
  - Summer (DST): UTC-4 (EDT)
- ZIP Codes: 02645 (Harwich); 02646 (Harwich Port); 02671 (West Harwich)
- FIPS code: 25-49700
- GNIS feature ID: 2378190

Northwest Harwich is a census-designated place (CDP) in the town of Harwich in Barnstable County, Massachusetts, United States. As of the 2020 census, Northwest Harwich had a population of 4,296. The CDP includes the Harwich villages of West Harwich, North Harwich, and Pleasant Lake, as well as a portion of the mailing area for Harwich Port.

== Geography ==
The Northwest Harwich CDP occupies the entire western side of the town of Harwich. Neighboring CDPs within Harwich, from north to south, are East Harwich, Harwich Center, and Harwich Port. Nantucket Sound is to the south, and the towns of Dennis and Brewster are to the west and north, respectively.

According to the United States Census Bureau, the Northwest Harwich CDP has a total area of 9.6 square miles (24.8 km^{2}), of which 8.0 square miles (20.7 km^{2}) is land, and 1.6 square miles (4.1 km^{2}) (16.46%) is water.

== Demographics ==
Historical population
Census	Pop.	Note	%±
2020	4,296		—
U.S. Decennial Census

=== 2020 census ===
As of the 2020 census, Northwest Harwich had a population of 4,296. The median age was 55.4 years. 14.5% of residents were under the age of 18 and 32.5% of residents were 65 years of age or older. For every 100 females there were 87.4 males, and for every 100 females age 18 and over there were 82.9 males age 18 and over.

100.0% of residents lived in urban areas, while 0.0% lived in rural areas.

There were 1,895 households in Northwest Harwich, of which 20.1% had children under the age of 18 living in them. Of all households, 49.4% were married-couple households, 16.6% were households with a male householder and no spouse or partner present, and 28.0% were households with a female householder and no spouse or partner present. About 31.9% of all households were made up of individuals and 17.7% had someone living alone who was 65 years of age or older.

There were 3,477 housing units, of which 45.5% were vacant. The homeowner vacancy rate was 1.1% and the rental vacancy rate was 5.1%.

Racial composition as of the 2020 census
Race	Number	Percent
White	3,685	85.8%
Black or African American	166	3.9%
American Indian and Alaska Native	13	0.3%
Asian	24	0.6%
Native Hawaiian and Other Pacific Islander	0	0.0%
Some other race	102	2.4%
Two or more races	306	7.1%
Hispanic or Latino (of any race)	139	3.2%

=== 2000 census ===
As of the 2000 census, there were 4,001 people, 1,608 households, and 1,093 families residing in the CDP. The population density was 190.2/km^{2} (492.9/mi^{2}). There were 3,126 housing units at an average density of 148.6/km^{2} (385.1/mi^{2}). The racial makeup of the CDP was 94.13% White, 1.15% African American, 0.22% Native American, 0.07% Asian, 0.10% Pacific Islander, 2.87% from other races, and 1.45% from two or more races. Hispanic or Latino of any race were 1.27% of the population.

There were 1,608 households, out of which 25.0% had children under the age of 18 living with them, 54.9% were married couples living together, 10.1% had a female householder with no husband present, and 32.0% were non-families. 26.4% of all households were made up of individuals, and 13.8% had someone living alone who was 65 years of age or older. The average household size was 2.32 and the average family size was 2.80.

In the CDP, the population was spread out, with 19.5% under the age of 18, 4.6% from 18 to 24, 22.6% from 25 to 44, 24.1% from 45 to 64, and 29.1% who were 65 years of age or older. The median age was 47 years. For every 100 females, there were 81.3 males. For every 100 females age 18 and over, there were 76.2 males.

The median income for a household in the CDP was $41,250, and the median income for a family was $53,533. Males had a median income of $41,170 versus $29,321 for females. The per capita income for the CDP was $22,602. About 1.5% of families and 3.9% of the population were below the poverty line, including 1.8% of those under age 18 and 7.7% of those age 65 or over.

== West Harwich ==
The principal populated center in the CDP is the village of West Harwich. West Harwich is located along Massachusetts Route 28 and has many stores, shops, homes, neighborhoods, apartments and vacation homes. West Harwich is home to the Holy Trinity School, which serves grades 5–8. Children in West Harwich may also attend the Harwich Elementary School located in Harwich Center. During the summer, West Harwich is among the most densely populated areas of Harwich and Dennis.

== North Harwich and Pleasant Lake ==
North Harwich and Pleasant Lake are less densely populated than West Harwich. North Harwich has been seeing some commercial activities in the past ten to fifteen years and has seen many new homes built. Pleasant Lake has remained as it always was, one of the least known Harwich villages.
