= Monomoy Regional School District =

School district in Massachusetts, United States

Location
- Chatham, Massachusetts US-MA United States

District information
- Type: Public
- Grades: Pre-K through 12
- Established: 2014
- Superintendent: Scott Carpenter
- Schools: Elementary 2 Middle 1 High 1
- Budget: $34,089,397 total $15,761 per pupil
- NCES District ID: 2500544

Students and staff
- District mascot: Shark
- Colors: Blue & White

Other information
- Website: monomoy.edu

The Monomoy Regional School District is a public school district established in 2014 which serves Chatham and Harwich, Massachusetts. The schools in MRSD include Monomoy Regional High School, Monomoy Regional Middle School, Chatham Elementary School and Harwich Elementary School.

== District information ==
There are four public schools in the district: two elementary schools, one middle school and one high school, with a total enrollment of just 1,931 students for the 2015–16 school year. 76.9% of the system's students graduate. The School Department’s budget was $34,089,397 in FY2014. The superintendent is Scott Carpenter.

79.8% of Monomoy Regional High School graduates pursue post-secondary studies. Students at all grade levels typically score slightly above state and national averages on all measures of standardized testing, including the MCAS and the SAT. Monomoy Regional High School offers sixteen advanced placement (AP) courses. MRHS teams compete in the Cape & Islands League. The schools enjoy strong support and involvement from parents, with active parent organizations at each school as well as numerous other opportunities for parents to participate in enhancing the educational program.
