= B.F.C. Whitehouse Field =

Baseball venue in Harwich, Massachusetts

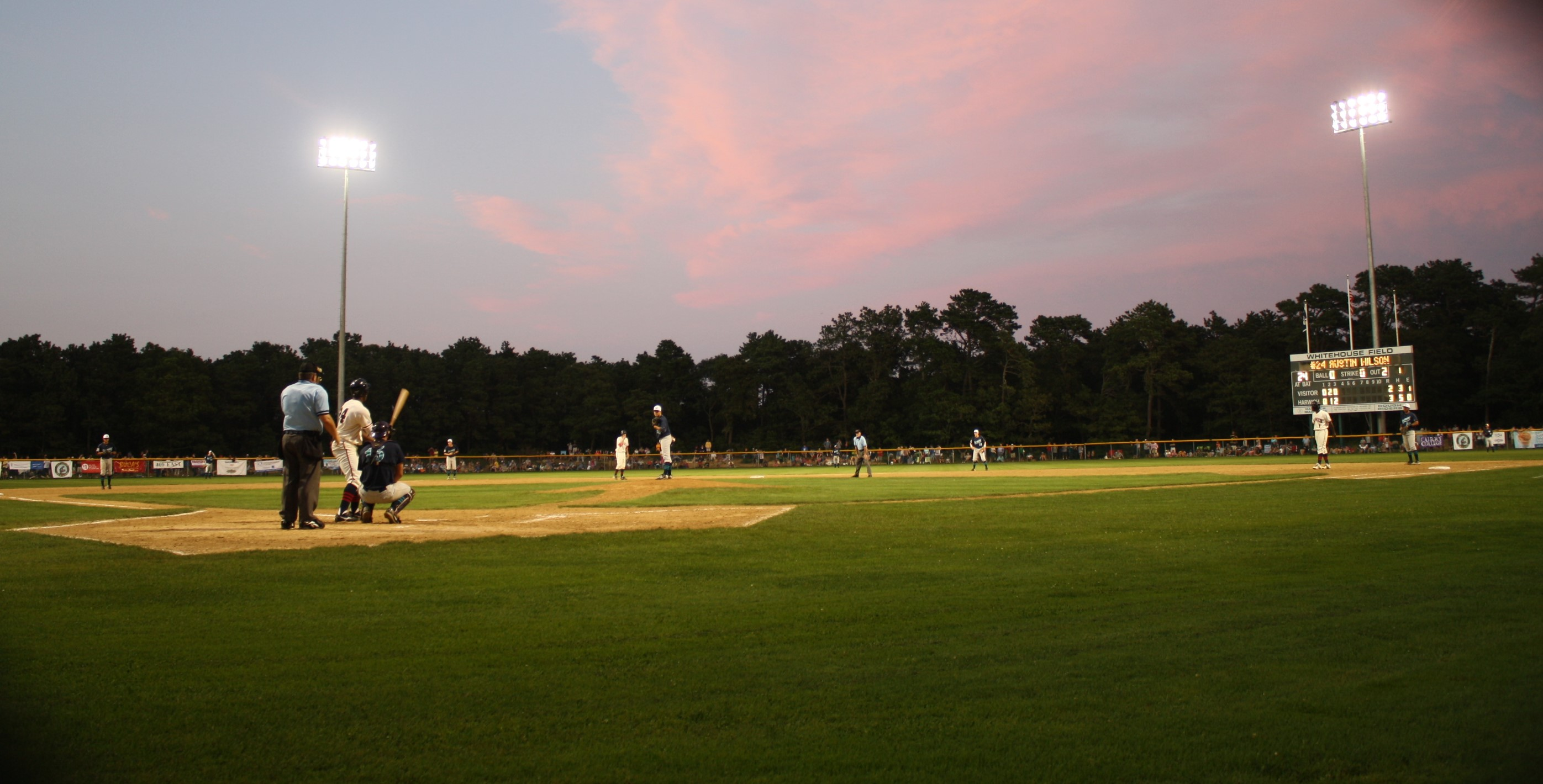
- Interactive map of B.F.C. Whitehouse Field
- Address: 75 Oak Street
- Location: Harwich, Massachusetts
- Coordinates: 41°41′34.80″N 70°03′56.9″W
- Capacity: 4,000
- Surface: Grass
- Scoreboard: The 1998 scoreboard was replaced with a new scoreboard for the summer of 2021 and beyond. The 1998 scoreboard was Donated by Fay Vincent, Jr. in memory of Fay Vincent, Sr.
- Field size: Left Field: 330 ft Center Field: 395 ft Right Field: 330 ft

Construction
- Opened: 1969

Tenant
- Harwich Mariners

B.F.C. Whitehouse Field, or Whitehouse Field, is a baseball venue in Harwich, Massachusetts, home to the Harwich Mariners of the Cape Cod Baseball League (CCBL).

Opened in 1969, Whitehouse Field was named for Mr. B.F.C. Whitehouse and was dedicated in July 1969 as part of Harwich's 275th anniversary celebration. The ballpark was built on land adjacent to what is now Monomoy Regional High School, and features a deep outfield fence with a symmetrical configuration. It is accessed via an extended woodland trail that opens into the tree-ringed clearing where the field is located.

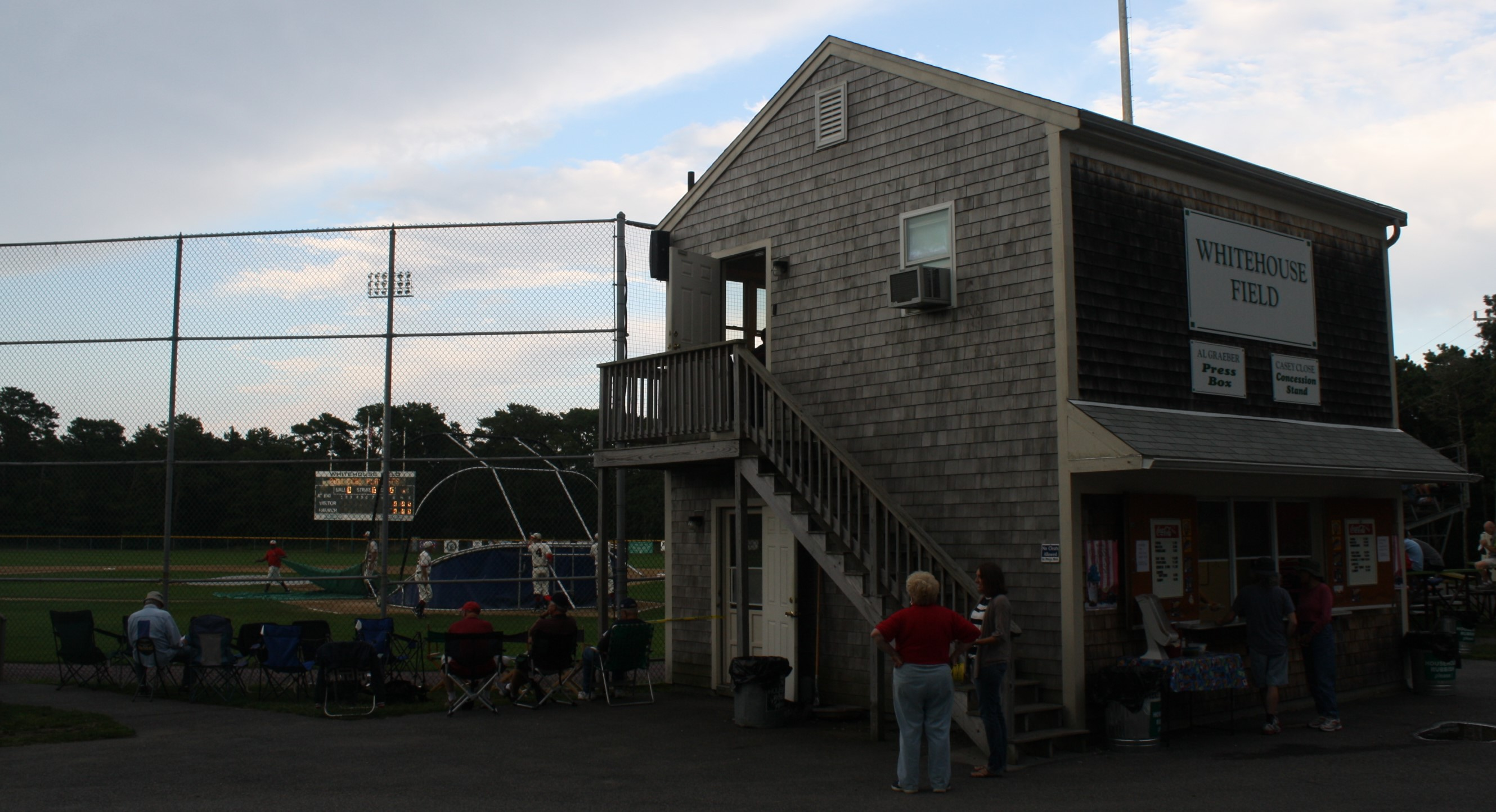
The press box/concession stand at Whitehouse Field

As early as the 1920s, Harwich had a franchise in the CCBL, albeit originally a combined Chatham-Harwich team. The Mariners became Harwich's own team in 1930, and prior to 1969 played their home games at Harwich's Brooks Park. At the 1969 dedication ceremonies for Whitehouse Field, Mr. Whitehouse concluded his remarks by stoking Harwich's historic small-town border rivalry, turning to the Mariners players and exhorting, "Now go out there and beat Chatham!"

In 1998, a new scoreboard was donated by former Major League Baseball commissioner Fay Vincent, Jr., in memory of his father, Fay Vincent, Sr. The commissioner had been a longtime summer resident of Harwich and a fan of the Mariners and the CCBL, and wished to honor his late father who had been the baseball captain at Yale University in 1931. The scoreboard was dedicated on July 6, 1998 as part of "Fay Vincent Night at Whitehouse Field", and has been billed by the CCBL as being "the largest scoreboard in New England south of Fenway Park". A 2008 grant from the Yawkey Foundation helped fund major upgrades to Whitehouse that included the installation of a new lighting system and protective netting.

Whitehouse Field hosted the CCBL's annual all-star game and home run derby festivities in 1992, 2002, 2012 and 2018, and has seen the Mariners claim CCBL championships in 1983, 1987, 2008 and 2011. The ballpark has been the summertime home of dozens of future major leaguers such as Kevin Millar, Josh Donaldson, and DJ LeMahieu.

== See also ==
- Harwich Mariners
- Cape Cod Baseball League
