= A. Elmer Crowell =

American woodcarver

- Born: Anthony Elmer Crowell; December 5, 1862; East Harwich, Massachusetts
- Died: January 1, 1952 (aged 89); East Harwich, Massachusetts
- Occupation: Wooden bird carver
- Years active: 1912–1952
- Known for: Carving wooden birds

Anthony Elmer Crowell, also known as A. Elmer Crowell (December 5, 1862 – January 1, 1952) was a master decoy carver from East Harwich, Massachusetts. Crowell specialized in shorebirds, waterfowl, and miniatures. Crowell's decoys are consistently regarded as some of the finest and most desirable decoys ever made. Also created a fair amount of flat art in oils and watercolors. Acted as a hunting guide and caretaker of waterfowl gunning stands in Massachusetts.

== Life ==
Crowell's father, Anthony S. Crowell, was a mariner and cranberry grower who may not have even cared much for hunting. Despite this, he bought Elmer his first gun in 1874, when the boy was 12. The land around their East Harwich, Massachusetts, home was rich in game and waterfowl, the numerous ponds and bays were a haven for sportsmen and market gunners from all over. Anthony Crowell owned property on Pleasant Lake near where the Crowells lived and Elmer built a gunning stand there in 1876. The stand stayed for many years while Elmer shot ducks, geese, and on occasion, shorebirds.

Despite this early interest in hunting, Crowell long favored live decoys to the block variety, perhaps proving that his career in carving block decoys didn't start until later on. In 1947, Crowell related in his article, "Cape Cod Memories," that, "The shooting was great. But we could not sell them in the markets, as the law cut it out. Soon the law cut out the live decoys, and that was the end of good shooting there." Crowell certainly didn't begin making decoys to support himself until later in life. By the late 1920s, Crowell's decoys were being churned out at a prodigious rate, and the quality suffered. For this reason, decoys of his from this period are slightly less desirable than those made earlier.

The decoy, as a form, implies both sculpture and function, and Crowell approached their creation as an artist. As George Hepplewhite wrote in the 18th century, the interpretation and execution of the decoys, "blend the useful with the agreeable." In particular, two of Crowell's decoys have repeatedly set world records for sales.

Crowell's preening pintail drake and Canada goose decoys share the world record at $1.13 million dollars. Their private sales were orchestrated by Stephen O'Brien Jr. as part of what remains the largest decoy sale ever, with over 30 birds changing hands for approximately $7.5 million.

Crowell's barn/workshop was restored and moved to the grounds near the Harwich Historical Society. It is open to the public as a museum, commemorating his life and work.
