= Pleasant Lake, Massachusetts =

Village in Massachusetts, United States

Coordinates: 41°42′50″N 70°04′56″W

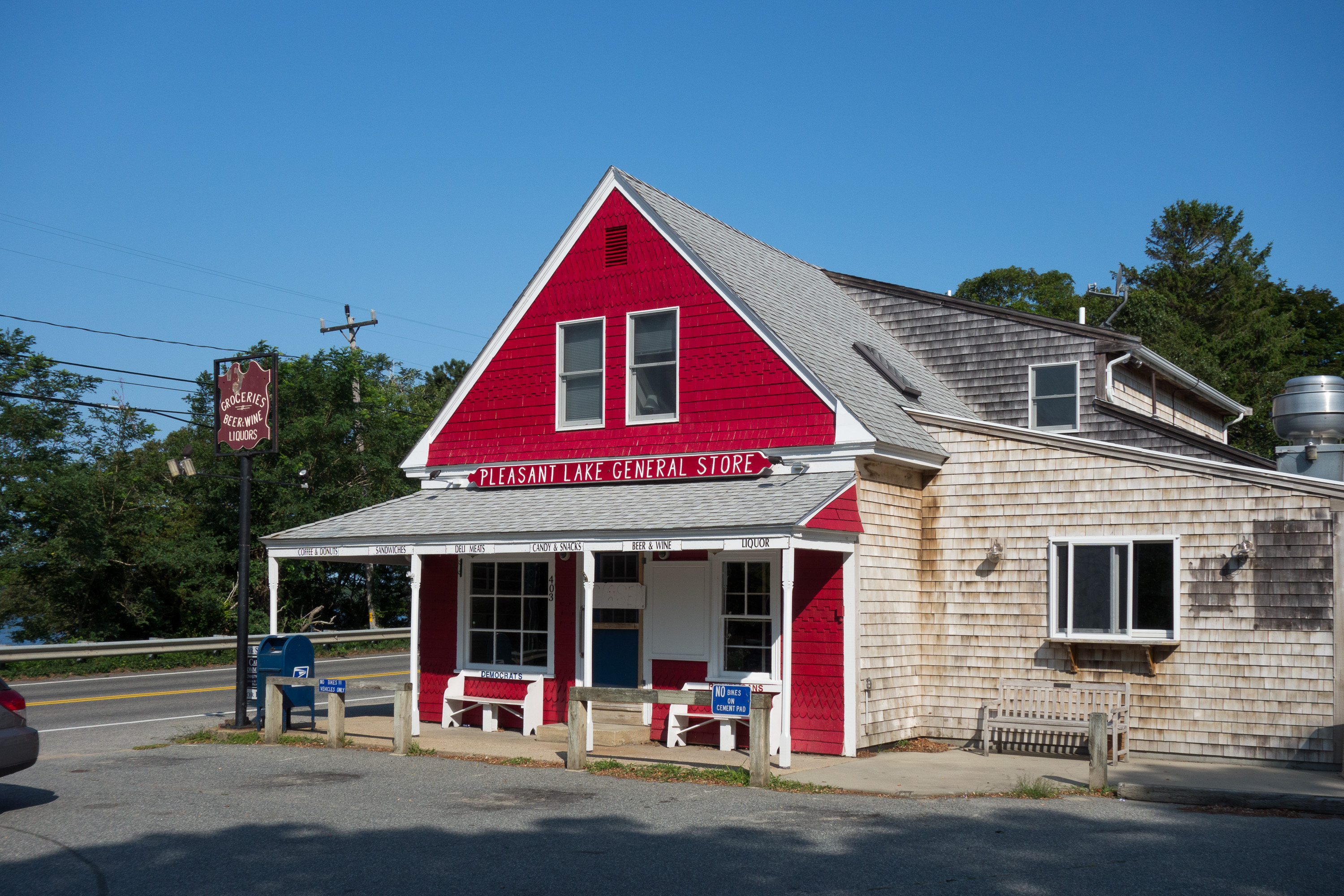
Pleasant Lake General Store

Pleasant Lake is a village in the town of Harwich in Barnstable County, United States. Located off the Mid-Cape Highway, most of the village is part of the census-designated place of Northwest Harwich.

Pleasant Lake is one of the least known of the Harwich villages.
