= East Harwich, Massachusetts =

- Census-designated place
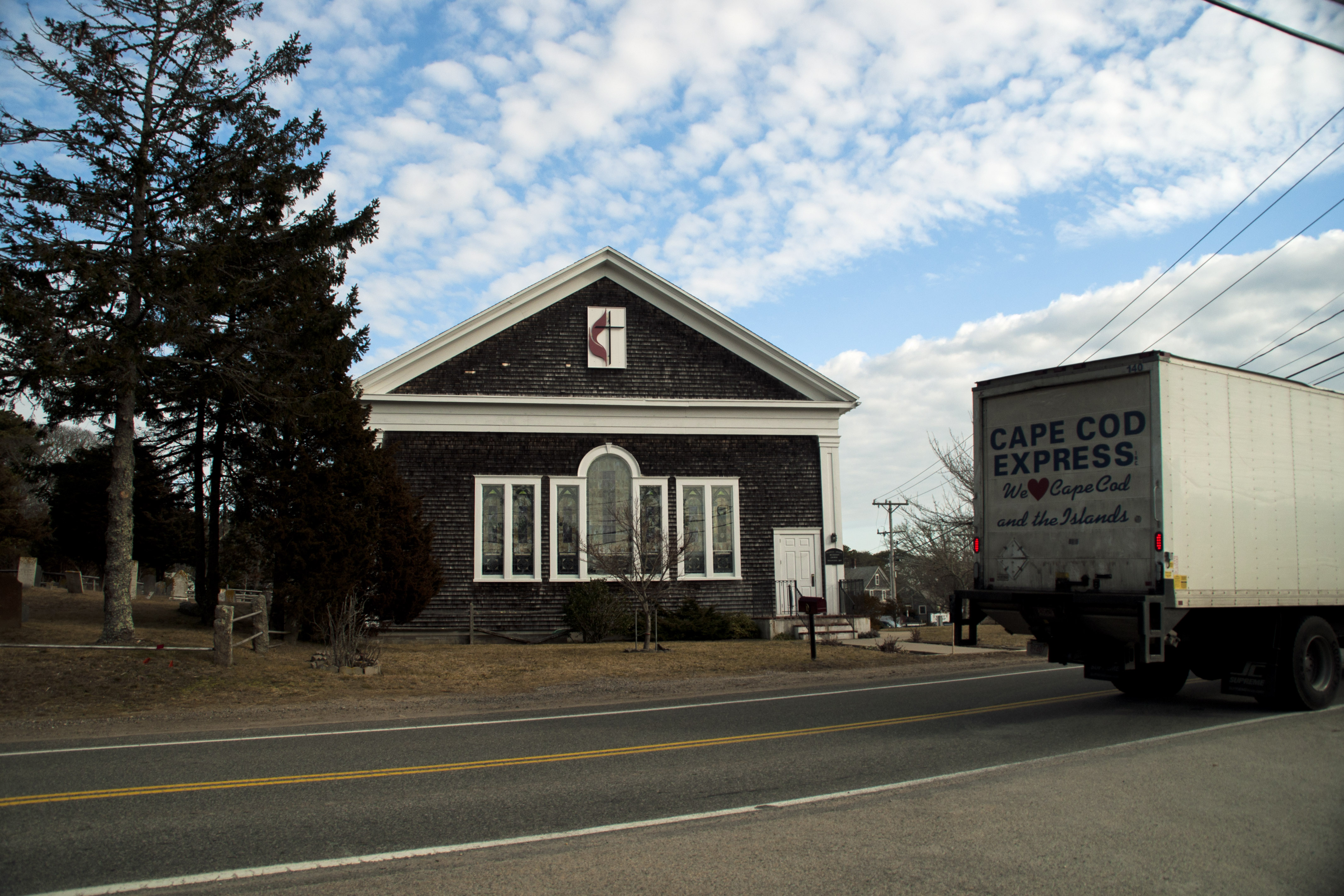
- East Harwich Methodist Church

- Location in Barnstable County and the state of Massachusetts.
- Coordinates: 41°42′28″N 70°1′53″W
- Country: United States
- State: Massachusetts
- County: Barnstable
- Town: Harwich

Area
  - Total: 8.77 sq mi (22.72 km^{2})
  - Land: 8.02 sq mi (20.77 km^{2})
  - Water: 0.75 sq mi (1.94 km^{2})
- Elevation: 62 ft (19 m)

Population (2020)
  - Total: 5,250
  - Density: 654.6/sq mi (252.73/km^{2})
- Time zone: UTC-5 (Eastern (EST))
  - Summer (DST): UTC-4 (EDT)
- ZIP code: 02645
- Area code: 508
- FIPS code: 25-19400
- GNIS feature ID: 0615926

East Harwich is a census-designated place (CDP) and village in the town of Harwich in Barnstable County, Massachusetts, United States. As of the 2020 census, East Harwich had a population of 5,250.

== Geography ==
East Harwich is located at 41°42′28″N 70°1′53″W (41.707881, -70.031345). It is bordered by the town of Brewster to the north and the town of Chatham to the southeast. Within the town of Harwich, the CDP of Northwest Harwich is to the west, across Long Pond Drive and Pleasant Lake Avenue (Massachusetts Route 124); Harwich Center is to the southwest, across Queen Anne Road and Chatham Road; and Harwich Port is to the south, across Chatham Road and Main Street (Massachusetts Route 28).

According to the United States Census Bureau, the East Harwich CDP has a total area of 8.8 square miles (22.7 km^{2}), of which 8.0 square miles (20.8 km^{2}) is land, and 0.73 square miles (1.9 km^{2}) (8.58%) is water.

== Demographics ==
Historical population
Census	Pop.	Note	%±
2020	5,250		—
U.S. Decennial Census

=== 2020 census ===
As of the 2020 census, East Harwich had a population of 5,250. The median age was 55.4 years. 14.7% of residents were under the age of 18 and 33.4% of residents were 65 years of age or older. For every 100 females there were 92.4 males, and for every 100 females age 18 and over there were 90.6 males age 18 and over.

100.0% of residents lived in urban areas, while 0.0% lived in rural areas.

There were 2,316 households in East Harwich, of which 20.2% had children under the age of 18 living in them. Of all households, 55.3% were married-couple households, 13.6% were households with a male householder and no spouse or partner present, and 26.7% were households with a female householder and no spouse or partner present. About 26.9% of all households were made up of individuals and 15.8% had someone living alone who was 65 years of age or older.

There were 3,308 housing units, of which 30.0% were vacant. The homeowner vacancy rate was 0.3% and the rental vacancy rate was 7.3%.

Racial composition as of the 2020 census
Race	Number	Percent
White	4,700	89.5%
Black or African American	104	2.0%
American Indian and Alaska Native	10	0.2%
Asian	62	1.2%
Native Hawaiian and Other Pacific Islander	0	0.0%
Some other race	102	1.9%
Two or more races	272	5.2%
Hispanic or Latino (of any race)	153	2.9%

=== 2000 census ===
As of the census of 2000, there were 4,744 people, 2,053 households, and 1,451 families residing in the CDP. The population density was 227.8 people/km^{2} (590 people/mi^{2}). There were 2,943 housing units at an average density of 141.3 units/km^{2} (366 units/mi^{2}). The racial makeup of the CDP was 96.65% White, 0.34% African American, 0.15% Native American, 0.38% Asian, 0.04% Pacific Islander, 1.08% from other races, and 1.37% from two or more races. Hispanic or Latino of any race were 0.93% of the population.

There were 2,053 households, out of which 23.1% had children under the age of 18 living with them, 58.9% were married couples living together, 9.0% had a female householder with no husband present, and 29.3% were non-families. 23.7% of all households were made up of individuals, and 13.0% had someone living alone who was 65 years of age or older. The average household size was 2.31 and the average family size was 2.71.

In the CDP, the population was spread out, with 19.4% under the age of 18, 3.7% from 18 to 24, 22.8% from 25 to 44, 27.2% from 45 to 64, and 26.9% who were 65 years of age or older. The median age was 48 years. For every 100 females, there were 92.0 males. For every 100 females age 18 and over, there were 87.7 males.

The median income for a household in the CDP was $46,777, and the median income for a family was $51,750. Males had a median income of $39,068 versus $26,977 for females. The per capita income for the CDP was $22,450. About 2.1% of families and 4.1% of the population were below the poverty line, including 8.3% of those under age 18 and none of those age 65 or over.
