= Harwich Center, Massachusetts =

- Census-designated place
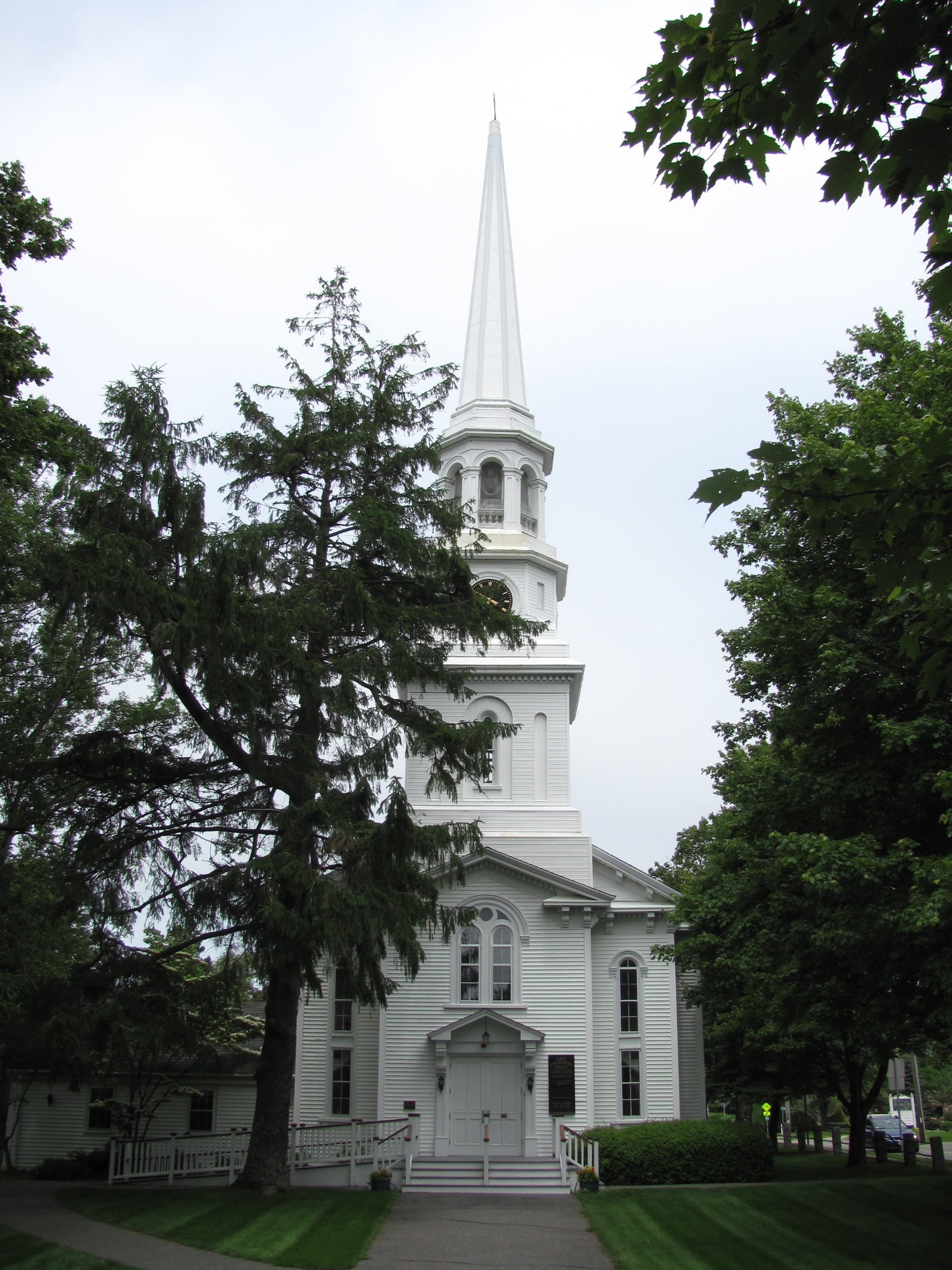
- First Congregational Church

- Location in Barnstable County and the state of Massachusetts.
- Coordinates: 41°41′18″N 70°4′19″W
- Country: United States
- State: Massachusetts
- County: Barnstable
- Town: Harwich

Area
  - Total: 2.29 sq mi (5.93 km^{2})
  - Land: 2.25 sq mi (5.83 km^{2})
  - Water: 0.042 sq mi (0.11 km^{2})

Population (2020)
  - Total: 1,995
  - Density: 887.0/sq mi (342.47/km^{2})
- Time zone: UTC-5 (Eastern (EST))
  - Summer (DST): UTC-4 (EDT)
- ZIP Code: 02645 (Harwich)
- FIPS code: 25-29055

Harwich Center is a census-designated place (CDP) in the town of Harwich in Barnstable County, Massachusetts, United States. As of the 2020 census, Harwich Center had a population of 1,995.

== Geography ==
Harwich Center comprises the central settlement in the town of Harwich, located at 41°41′18″N 70°4′19″W (41.688302, -70.072015). It is bordered by the CDPs of Northwest Harwich to the north and west, East Harwich to the north and east, and Harwich Port to the south. The village center is at the intersection of Massachusetts Route 39 (Main Street) and Massachusetts Route 124 (Pleasant Lake Avenue).

According to the United States Census Bureau, the Harwich Center CDP has a total area of 2.3 square miles (5.9 km^{2}), of which 2.2 square miles (5.8 km^{2}) is land, and 0.039 square miles (0.1 km^{2}) (1.83%) is water.

== Demographics ==
Historical population
Census	Pop.	Note	%±
2020	1,995		—
U.S. Decennial Census

=== 2020 census ===
As of the 2020 census, Harwich Center had a population of 1,995. The median age was 58.6 years. 15.4% of residents were under the age of 18 and 37.7% of residents were 65 years of age or older. For every 100 females there were 82.4 males, and for every 100 females age 18 and over there were 79.1 males age 18 and over.

100.0% of residents lived in urban areas, while 0.0% lived in rural areas.

There were 897 households in Harwich Center, of which 19.1% had children under the age of 18 living in them. Of all households, 42.3% were married-couple households, 16.5% were households with a male householder and no spouse or partner present, and 36.0% were households with a female householder and no spouse or partner present. About 36.4% of all households were made up of individuals and 26.6% had someone living alone who was 65 years of age or older.

There were 1,252 housing units, of which 28.4% were vacant. The homeowner vacancy rate was 0.6% and the rental vacancy rate was 4.2%.

Racial composition as of the 2020 census
Race	Number	Percent
White	1,794	89.9%
Black or African American	46	2.3%
American Indian and Alaska Native	2	0.1%
Asian	8	0.4%
Native Hawaiian and Other Pacific Islander	1	0.1%
Some other race	42	2.1%
Two or more races	102	5.1%
Hispanic or Latino (of any race)	65	3.3%

=== 2000 census ===
As of the census of 2000, there were 1,832 people, 810 households, and 514 families residing in the CDP. The population density was 314.4 people/km^{2} (814 people/mi^{2}). There were 1,102 housing units at an average density of 189.1 units/km^{2} (490 units/mi^{2}). The racial makeup of the CDP was 92.69% White, 0.82% African American, 0.27% Native American, 0.27% Asian, 3.93% from other races, and 2.02% from two or more races. Hispanic or Latino of any race were 0.66% of the population.

There were 810 households, out of which 22.8% had children under the age of 18 living with them, 51.0% were married couples living together, 9.9% had a female householder with no husband present, and 36.5% were non-families. 31.1% of all households were made up of individuals, and 17.2% had someone living alone who was 65 years of age or older. The average household size was 2.22 and the average family size was 2.79.

In the CDP, the population was spread out, with 19.5% under the age of 18, 5.4% from 18 to 24, 22.8% from 25 to 44, 26.0% from 45 to 64, and 26.3% who were 65 years of age or older. The median age was 46 years. For every 100 females, there were 83.8 males. For every 100 females age 18 and over, there were 76.9 males.

The median income for a household in the CDP was $41,230, and the median income for a family was $53,077. Males had a median income of $35,950 versus $25,690 for females. The per capita income for the CDP was $23,702. About 1.9% of families and 3.9% of the population were below the poverty line, including 2.2% of those under age 18 and 4.0% of those age 65 or over.
