= Monomoy Regional High School =

School in Massachusetts, United States

Location
- 75 Oak St. Harwich, Massachusetts 02645; United States
- 41°41′26.41″N 70°04′12.95″W

Information
- Type: Public; Open enrollment
- Established: 2014
- Superintendent: Scott Carpenter
- Principal: Jennifer Police
- Staff: 61.02 (FTE)
- Grades: 8–12
- Enrollment: 719 (2023–2024)
- Student to teacher ratio: 11.78
- Campus: Suburban
- Colors: Blue, silver, and white
- Athletics conference: Cape & Islands League
- Mascot: Shark
- Budget: $35,186,124 total $16,135 per pupil (2016)
- Communities served: Chatham, Harwich
- Website: Monomoy Regional School District

Monomoy Regional High School is a regional secondary school located in Harwich, Massachusetts, United States, and within Monomoy Regional School District. Monomoy Regional High School serves approximately 625 students in grades 8-12 from the towns of Chatham and Harwich.

Construction of the high school was completed in early 2014 and officially opened in September 2014. The school's mascot is the Sharks and the school colors are Navy Blue & Silver.

== Athletics ==
All the athletic teams from Harwich High School and Chatham High School began competing cooperatively as the Monomoy Sharks in Fall 2012 for all sports offered by both schools.

Monomoy offers 20 interscholastic athletic teams along with multiple club and intramural teams. As of 2023, Monomoy is a member of the Cape & Islands League, which competes in the Division 4 level of athletic competition in Massachusetts, and is affiliated with the Massachusetts Interscholastic Athletic Association.

In May 2015, Monomoy Regional High School gained approval from the South Shore League at the annual league meeting to leave the league and join the Cape & Islands League, citing travel expenses and competition as the main factors regarding their departure. Monomoy was a member of the South Shore League since the mid-1990s. The change took effect during the beginning of the 2016–17 academic year. The football team's league affiliation was in question due to the change, as the Cape & Islands League did not sponsor football. As of 2023, the Sharks play in the new Cape and Islands League Lighthouse Division. With the departure of Monomoy, Mashpee is left as the South Shore League's lone representative from Cape Cod.

During the Fall 2023 season, both Girls Field Hockey and Boys Soccer advanced to the MIAA State Finals.

Listed below are the sports offered at Monomoy Regional High School:

- Fall
  - Football
  - Field Hockey
  - Boys' Soccer
  - Girls' Soccer
  - Cheerleading
  - Cross Country
  - Boys' Golf
- Winter
  - Boys' Basketball
  - Girls' Basketball
  - Ice Hockey (co-op with Mashpee)
  - Cheerleading
- Spring
  - Baseball
  - Softball
  - Boys' Tennis
  - Girls' Tennis
  - Boys' Lacrosse
  - Girls' Lacrosse
  - Track & Field
  - Sailing
  - Girls' Golf
