= North Harwich, Massachusetts =

- Village
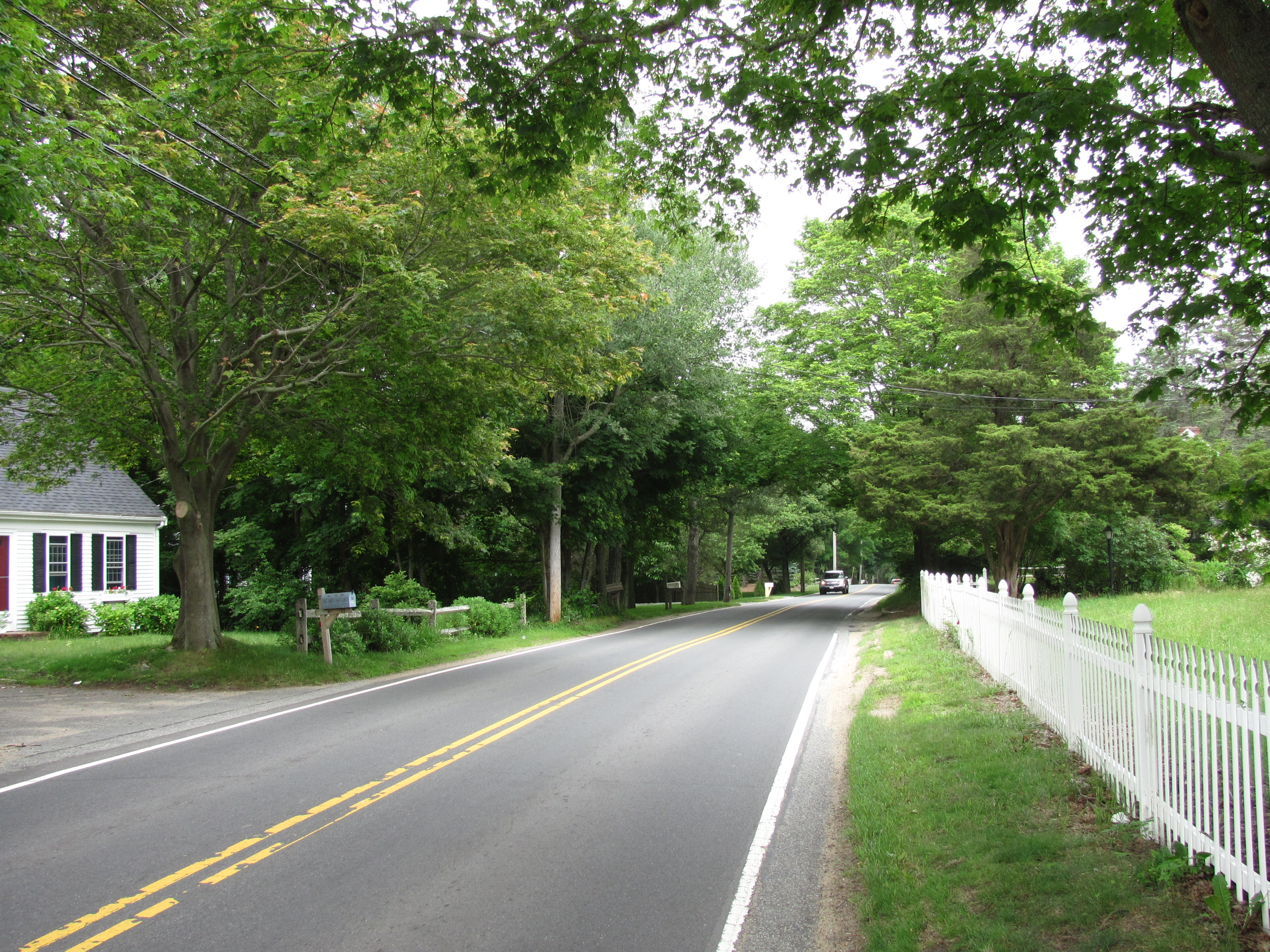
- Main Street

- Location within Cape Cod
- Coordinates: 41°41′45″N 70°07′13″W
- Country: United States
- State: Massachusetts
- County: Barnstable
- Town: Harwich
- Elevation: 39 ft (12 m)
- Time zone: UTC-5 (Eastern (EST))
  - Summer (DST): UTC-4 (EDT)
- ZIP Code: 02645 (Harwich)
- GNIS feature ID: 615968

North Harwich is a village in the town of Harwich in Barnstable County, Massachusetts, United States. The village is located within the census-designated place of Northwest Harwich.

== Geography ==
North Harwich has many cranberry bogs. U.S. Route 6 travels through the area. Great Western Road connects the towns of Dennis, Harwich and Yarmouth. There have been many new developments being constructed in this once isolated part of town, beginning in the late 1980s and continuing into the 2020s. Sand Pond, a public beach, is located in North Hawich. The Cape Cod Fish and Game is located in North Harwich along with a new development of houses. Patriot Square Shopping Center, located close by in the town of Dennis, has a variety of supermarkets and stores available.

== Commercial development ==
North Harwich has seen much commercial development during the 20th and 21st centuries. The Old North Harwich railroad station site is still there today, although it has since been converted to factories. On Queen Anne Road, multiple warehouses and factories occupy the area, including the Harwich Town Dump.

== Demographics ==
North Harwich is located in the CDP Northwest Harwich.
