= Harwich Port, Massachusetts =

- Census-designated place
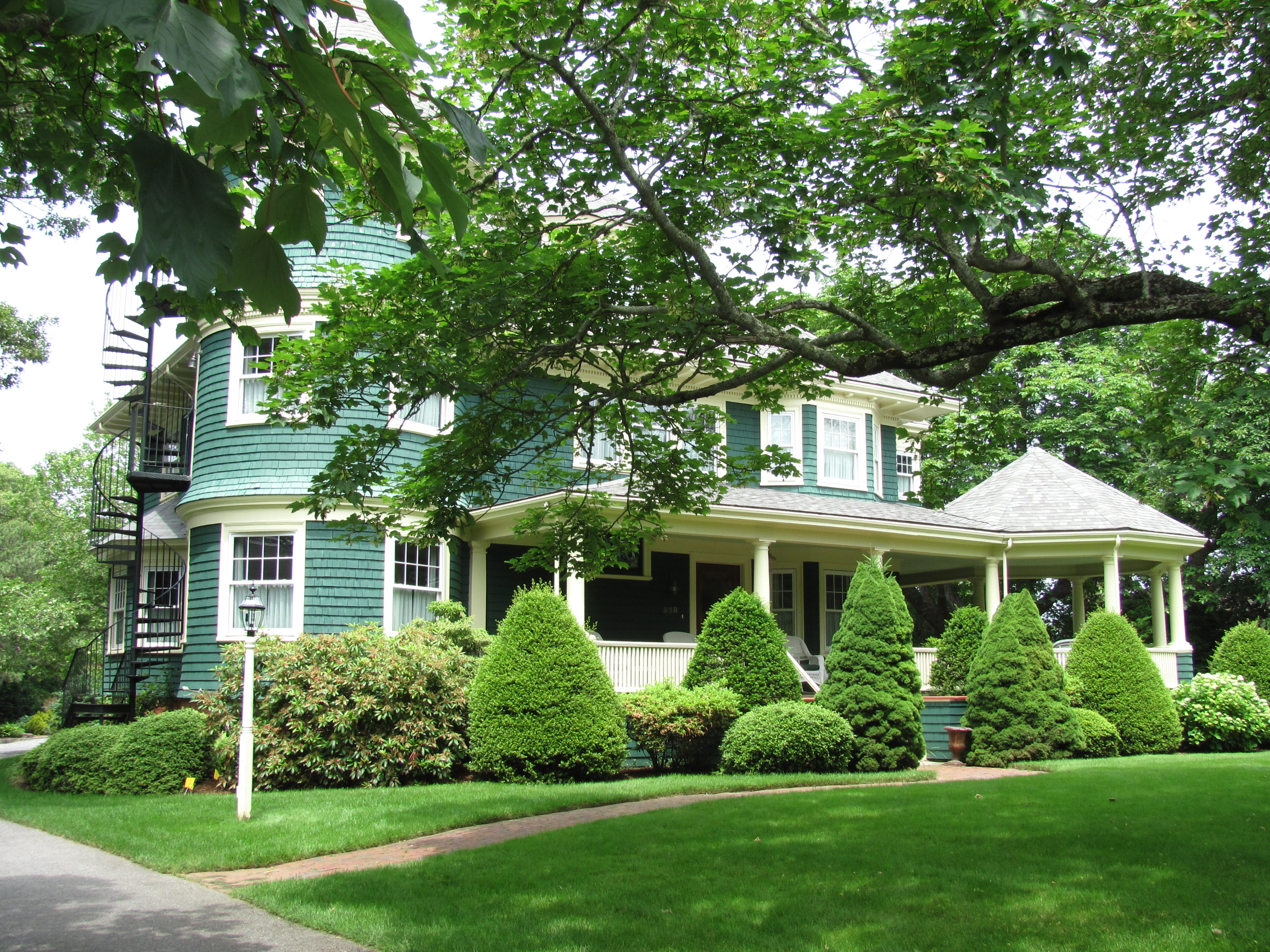
- Augustus Snow House
- Motto(s): Three Harbors, One Port
- Location in Barnstable County and the state of Massachusetts.
- Coordinates: 41°40′5″N 70°4′9″W
- Country: United States
- State: Massachusetts
- County: Barnstable
- Town: Harwich

Area
  - Total: 2.88 sq mi (7.46 km^{2})
  - Land: 2.63 sq mi (6.82 km^{2})
  - Water: 0.25 sq mi (0.64 km^{2})
- Elevation: 20 ft (6 m)

Population (2020)
  - Total: 1,899
  - Density: 721.6/sq mi (278.62/km^{2})
- Time zone: UTC-5 (Eastern (EST))
  - Summer (DST): UTC-4 (EDT)
- ZIP Codes: 02646 (Harwich Port); 02645 (Harwich)
- Area code: 508
- FIPS code: 25-29090
- GNIS feature ID: 0615941

Harwich Port (also spelled Harwichport) is a small affluent seaside community and census-designated place (CDP) situated along the Nantucket Sound in the town of Harwich in Barnstable County, Massachusetts, United States. It is named after the port of Harwich in Essex, England. As of the 2020 census, Harwich Port had a population of 1,899. It is a popular vacation spot on Cape Cod and is home to the Wychmere Beach Club and the Allen Harbor Yacht Club. Also, one of its popular mottos is "Three Harbors, One Port," referencing to Saquatucket, Wychmere, and Allen Harbor, which are all located in Harwich Port. Well known residents include Bill O'Brien, former head coach and general manager of the Houston Texans, an American football team.

== Geography ==
Harwich Port is located in the southeastern part of the town of Harwich at 41°40′5″N 70°4′9″W. It is bordered by the Nantucket Sound to the south, Northwest Harwich to the west, Harwich Center to the north, East Harwich to the northeast, and the town of Chatham to the east. Saquatucket and Wychmere Harbors are located in Harwich Port. Neighboring Allen Harbor, while having a Harwich Port mailing address, is located in the Northwest Harwich CDP.

According to the United States Census Bureau, the CDP has a total area of 3.5 square miles (9.0 km^{2}), of which 2.6 square miles (6.8 km^{2}) is land and 0.85 square miles (2.2 km^{2}) (24.19%) is water.

== Demographics ==
Historical population
Census	Pop.	Note	%±
2020	1,899		—
U.S. Decennial Census

=== 2020 census ===
As of the 2020 census, Harwich Port had a population of 1,899. The median age was 63.3 years. 8.1% of residents were under the age of 18 and 46.4% of residents were 65 years of age or older. For every 100 females, there were 81.4 males, and for every 100 females age 18 and over there were 81.1 males age 18 and over.

100.0% of residents lived in urban areas, while 0.0% lived in rural areas.

There were 1,087 households in Harwich Port, of which 9.9% had children under the age of 18 living in them. Of all households, 39.7% were married-couple households, 15.9% were households with a male householder and no spouse or partner present, and 39.9% were households with a female householder and no spouse or partner present. About 47.0% of all households were made up of individuals, and 32.3% had someone living alone who was 65 years of age or older.

There were 2,448 housing units, of which 55.6% were vacant. The homeowner vacancy rate was 2.2% and the rental vacancy rate was 13.8%.

Racial composition as of the 2020 census
Race	Number	Percent
White	1,743	91.8%
Black or African American	34	1.8%
American Indian and Alaska Native	6	0.3%
Asian	14	0.7%
Native Hawaiian and Other Pacific Islander	1	0.1%
Some other race	30	1.6%
Two or more races	71	3.7%
Hispanic or Latino (of any race)	22	1.2%

=== 2000 census ===
As of the census of 2000, there were 1,809 people, 1,000 households, and 485 families residing in the CDP. The population density was 265.6 people/km^{2} (688 people/mi^{2}). There were 2,279 housing units at an average density of 334.6 units/km^{2} (867 units/mi^{2}). The racial makeup of the CDP was 97.73% White, 0.61% African American, 0.11% Native American, 0.06% Asian, 0.77% from other races, and 0.72% from two or more races. Hispanic or Latino of any race were 0.66% of the population. During the summer the population almost doubles with the influx of tourists.

There were 1,000 households, out of which 10.7% had children under the age of 18 living with them, 41.4% were married couples living together, 6.5% had a female householder with no husband present, and 51.4% were non-families. 46.9% of all households were made up of individuals, and 29.7% had someone living alone who was 65 years of age or older. The average household size was 1.79 and the average family size was 2.49.

In the CDP, the population was spread out, with 11.3% under the age of 18, 3.6% from 18 to 24, 18.5% from 25 to 44, 25.4% from 45 to 64, and 41.1% who were 65 years of age or older. The median age was 58 years. For every 100 females, there were 74.1 males. For every 100 females age 18 and over, there were 71.9 males.

The median income for a household in the CDP was $29,583, and the median income for a family was $45,385. Males had a median income of $31,250 versus $33,229 for females. The per capita income for the CDP was $25,085. About 9.9% of families and 14.6% of the population were below the poverty line, including 44.1% of those under age 18 and 6.7% of those age 65 or over.
