= Old Hose House =

- U.S. National Register of Historic Places
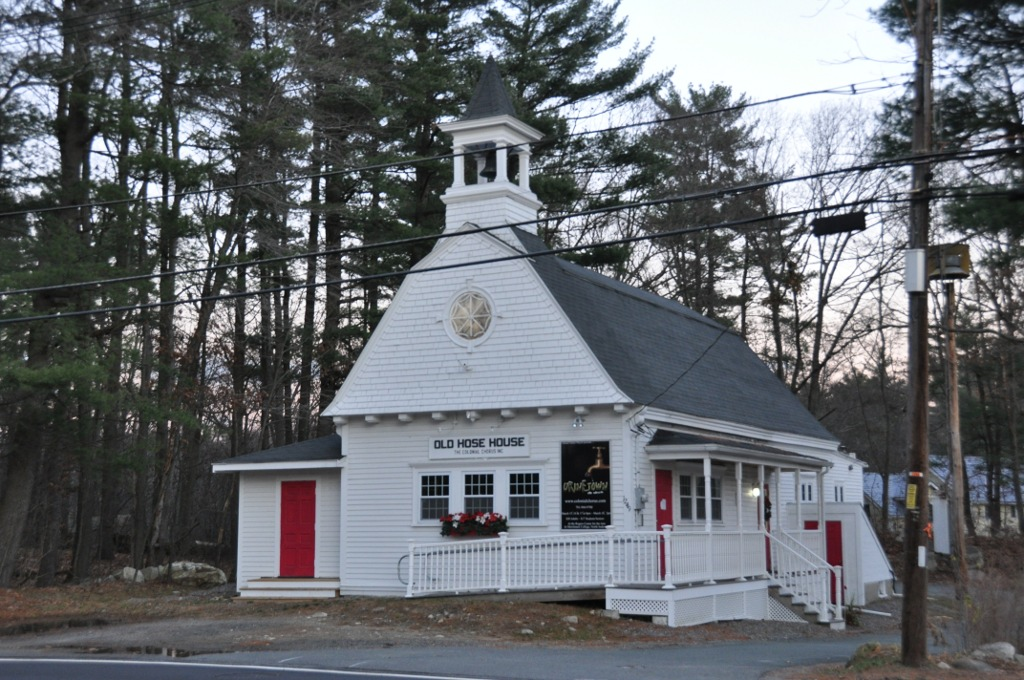

- Location within Massachusetts Location within the United States
- Location: 1249 Main Street, Reading, Massachusetts
- Coordinates: 42°33′0″N 71°6′17″W
- Built: 1902
- Architectural style: Colonial Revival
- MPS: Reading MRA
- NRHP reference No.: 84002769
- Added to NRHP: July 19, 1984

The Old Hose House is a historic fire house in Reading, Massachusetts. The Colonial Revival wood-frame building was constructed in 1902 for a cost of $1,180.50, plus $10 for the land on which it stands. The modestly-scaled building housed a fire truck until 1930, after which time it has served as home to community groups. The building was listed on the National Register of Historic Places in 1984.

== Description and history ==
The Old Hose House is set on the east side of Main Street (Massachusetts Route 28), a major thoroughfare, in a rural-suburban area of northern Reading. It is a modestly sized single-story wood-frame structure, with Colonial Revival styling, including a gambrel roof with an overhanging street-facing gable that has decorative brackets in the overhang. The gable end has a small round window with leaded lights, and the roof is topped by a small square belfry with a pyramidal roof. The main street-facing facade has a band of three small square windows, the engine bay entrance having been built over. The building is entered on the right side, where a hip-roof porch extends along a portion of that side.

The building was built in 1902 to house a hand-pump fire truck that was operated by a volunteer fire company organized in 1815. The town paid the $10 for the land and $1,180.50 for the building's construction. The bell was taken from the town's John Street school and installed in 1904. In 1930, after the town had adopted more modern equipment, the building was sold to a local community theater organization, which staged inexpensive productions in the building. In 1972 it was sold to Colonial Chorus Players a community theater group, which uses it as a rehearsal space.

== See also ==
- National Register of Historic Places listings in Reading, Massachusetts
- National Register of Historic Places listings in Middlesex County, Massachusetts
