= East Falmouth, Massachusetts =

- Census-designated place
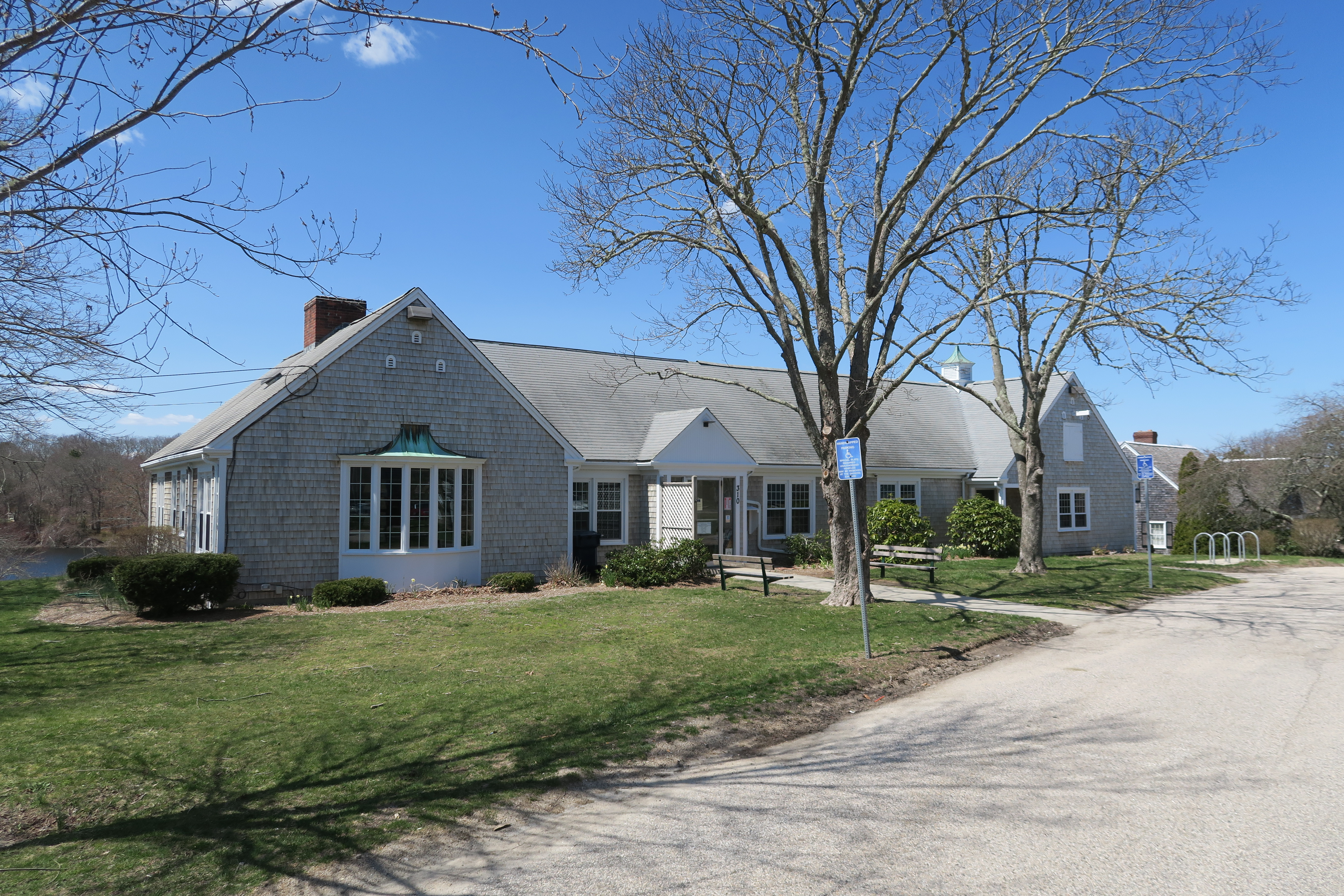
- East Branch; Falmouth Public Library

- Location in Barnstable County and the state of Massachusetts.
- Coordinates: 41°34′43″N 70°33′32″W
- Country: United States
- State: Massachusetts
- County: Barnstable
- Town: Falmouth

Area
  - Total: 6.29 sq mi (16.29 km^{2})
  - Land: 5.44 sq mi (14.08 km^{2})
  - Water: 0.85 sq mi (2.21 km^{2})
- Elevation: 36 ft (11 m)

Population (2020)
  - Total: 6,278
  - Density: 1,154.9/sq mi (445.91/km^{2})
- Time zone: UTC-5 (Eastern (EST))
  - Summer (DST): UTC-4 (EDT)
- ZIP code: 02536
- Area code: 508
- FIPS code: 25-18980
- GNIS feature ID: 0616388

East Falmouth is a census-designated place (CDP) in the town of Falmouth in Barnstable, Massachusetts, United States. It is located at the base of Massachusetts' Cape Cod peninsula (see map at right). As of the 2020 census, East Falmouth had a population of 6,278, making it the most populous of the six CDPs in Falmouth.

== Geography ==
East Falmouth is located in the southeastern part of Falmouth at 41°33′54″N 70°33′0″W (41.565096, -70.549984). It is bordered to the west by the village of Teaticket and to the east by the Childs River. Its southern border is the shore of Vineyard Sound.

According to the United States Census Bureau, the CDP has a total area of 6.3 square miles (16.3 km^{2}), of which 5.4 square miles (14.1 km^{2}) is land and 0.85 square miles (2.2 km^{2}) (13.54%) is water.

=== East Falmouth neighborhoods ===
South of Massachusetts Route 28, the CDP is split into four necks, separated by tidal creeks (or "ponds"), each neck forming a natural neighborhood within the CDP. From east to west, the neighborhoods are:

Neighborhood	Neighborhood association	Neck	Surrounding body/bodies of water
Seacoast Shores	Seacoast Shores Association		Eel Pond, Waquoit Bay (Waquoit Bay Research Reserve)
Menauhant	Menauhant Yacht Club		Eel Pond, Bournes Pond, Vineyard Sound
Davisville		Davis Neck	Green Pond, Bournes Pond, Vineyard Sound
Acapesket	Shorewood Drive Association; Great Harbors Resident Association	Lewis Neck	Great Pond, Green Pond, Vineyard Sound

=== Seacoast Shores ===
Seacoast Shores, formerly known as Jenkin's Neck, is one of the most densely populated neighborhoods in Falmouth, containing 905 homes. The Seacoast Shores Association is a not-for-profit organization that maintains 22 rights of way and a private beach for association members and residents of the neighborhood.

=== Great Harbors ===
Great Harbors is a private community located on Lewis Neck north of Acapesket and consisting of 11 streets and almost 400 houses. The Great Harbors Resident Association is a non-profit organization that governs and manages the community, incorporated in December 1966. Great Harbors is a waterfront community, with its longest street on the water, as well as its pool/tennis/recreation complex and two boat docks. Great Harbors is managed by a volunteer board of directors, elected by all members of the association at an annual meeting in June.

=== Other areas ===
The East Falmouth area has two small non-census designated villages nearby. Hatchville is located to the north of East Falmouth, along Massachusetts Route 151 next to Coonamessett Pond, and Waquoit is located to the east, along Route 28 in the easternmost corner of Falmouth. While not part of the East Falmouth CDP (and thus not included in the census counts for East Falmouth), each village falls under the East Falmouth postal service jurisdiction.

== Demographics ==
Historical population
Census	Pop.	Note	%±
2020	6,278		—
U.S. Decennial Census

=== 2020 census ===
As of the 2020 census, East Falmouth had a population of 6,278. The median age was 57.0 years. 14.2% of residents were under the age of 18 and 33.4% of residents were 65 years of age or older. For every 100 females there were 92.8 males, and for every 100 females age 18 and over there were 89.9 males age 18 and over.

100.0% of residents lived in urban areas, while 0.0% lived in rural areas.

There were 2,875 households in East Falmouth, of which 18.2% had children under the age of 18 living in them. Of all households, 48.5% were married-couple households, 16.7% were households with a male householder and no spouse or partner present, and 28.6% were households with a female householder and no spouse or partner present. About 31.1% of all households were made up of individuals and 16.7% had someone living alone who was 65 years of age or older.

There were 4,825 housing units, of which 40.4% were vacant. The homeowner vacancy rate was 0.9% and the rental vacancy rate was 7.9%.

Racial composition as of the 2020 census
Race	Number	Percent
White	5,369	85.5%
Black or African American	146	2.3%
American Indian and Alaska Native	63	1.0%
Asian	94	1.5%
Native Hawaiian and Other Pacific Islander	1	0.0%
Some other race	158	2.5%
Two or more races	447	7.1%
Hispanic or Latino (of any race)	175	2.8%

=== 2000 census ===
As of the census of 2000, there were 6,615 people, 2,828 households, and 1,923 families residing in the CDP. The population density was 468.6 people/km^{2} (1,214 people/mi^{2}). There were 4,323 housing units at an average density of 306.3 units/km^{2} (793 units/mi^{2}). The racial makeup of the CDP was 92.20% White, 2.92% African American, 0.48% Native American, 0.51% Asian, 0.02% Pacific Islander, 1.68% from other races, and 2.19% from two or more races. Hispanic or Latino of any race were 1.75% of the population.

There were 2,828 households, out of which 24.0% had children under the age of 18 living with them, 51.6% were married couples living together, 12.7% had a female householder with no husband present, and 32.0% were non-families. 27.1% of all households were made up of individuals, and 11.6% had someone living alone who was 65 years of age or older. The average household size was 2.32 and the average family size was 2.79.

In the CDP, the population was spread out, with 21.5% under the age of 18, 4.7% from 18 to 24, 24.7% from 25 to 44, 26.1% from 45 to 64, and 22.9% who were 65 years of age or older. The median age was 44 years. For every 100 females, there were 89.5 males. For every 100 females age 18 and over, there were 84.3 males.

The median income for a household in the CDP was $42,788, and the median income for a family was $48,302. Males had a median income of $36,884 versus $26,875 for females. The per capita income for the CDP was $24,041. About 6.2% of families and 8.0% of the population were below the poverty line, including 12.0% of those under age 18 and 4.6% of those age 65 or over.
