= Teaticket, Massachusetts =

- Census-designated place
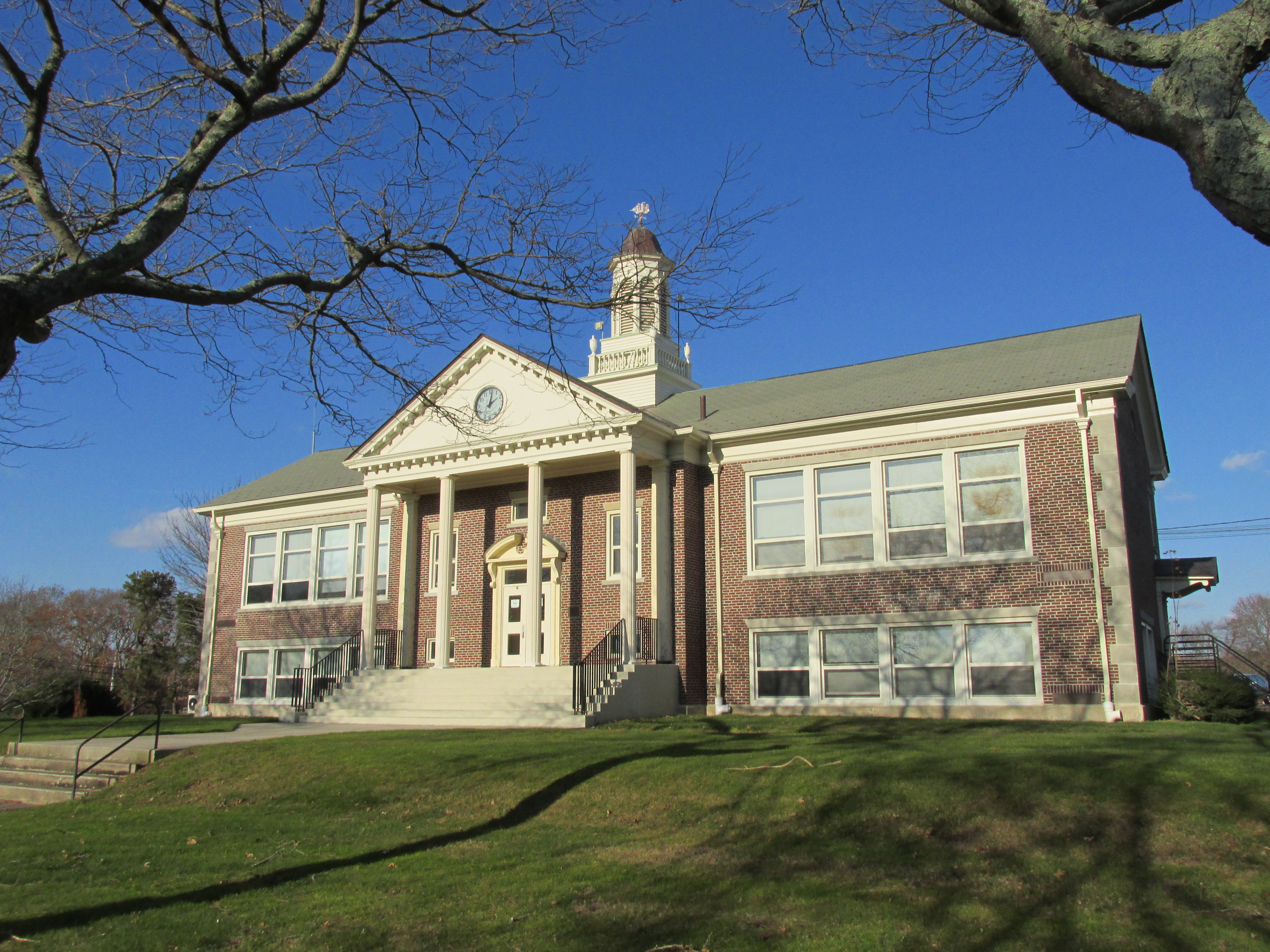
- School Administration building (Teaticket School 1927-Present)

- Location in Barnstable County and the state of Massachusetts.
- Coordinates: 41°33′29″N 70°35′13″W
- Country: United States
- State: Massachusetts
- County: Barnstable
- Town: Falmouth

Area
  - Total: 1.35 sq mi (3.49 km^{2})
  - Land: 1.05 sq mi (2.73 km^{2})
  - Water: 0.30 sq mi (0.77 km^{2})
- Elevation: 26 ft (8 m)

Population (2020)
  - Total: 1,663
  - Density: 1,578/sq mi (609.3/km^{2})
- Time zone: UTC-5 (Eastern (EST))
  - Summer (DST): UTC-4 (EDT)
- ZIP code: 02536
- Area code: 508
- FIPS code: 25-69205
- GNIS feature ID: 0616474

Teaticket /ˈtiːˌtɪkɪt/ is a census-designated place (CDP) in the town of Falmouth, Massachusetts. As of the 2020 census, Teaticket had a population of 1,663.

Its name comes from the Wampanoag word "Tataket," which translates roughly and appropriately as "at the principal tidal stream."

== Geography ==
Teaticket is located in the southern part of the town of Falmouth at 41°33′29″N 70°35′13″W (41.557934, -70.586815), between the villages of East Falmouth (to the east) and Falmouth (to the west). Massachusetts Route 28 runs east–west through the center of the village. South of 28, the CDP occupies a neck, bordered by Great Pond to the east and Little Pond to the west, that extends to Vineyard Sound. The neck is home to the Maravista neighborhood.

According to the United States Census Bureau, the Teaticket CDP has a total area of 1.4 square miles (3.5 km^{2}), of which 1.0 square mile (2.7 km^{2}) is land and 0.31 square miles (0.8 km^{2}), or 21.90%, is water.

== Demographics ==
Historical population
Census	Pop.	Note	%±
2020	1,663		—
U.S. Decennial Census

=== 2020 census ===
As of the 2020 census, Teaticket had a population of 1,663. The median age was 61.0 years. 11.2% of residents were under the age of 18 and 42.3% of residents were 65 years of age or older. For every 100 females there were 85.8 males, and for every 100 females age 18 and over there were 84.6 males age 18 and over.

100.0% of residents lived in urban areas, while 0.0% lived in rural areas.

There were 854 households in Teaticket, of which 16.3% had children under the age of 18 living in them. Of all households, 43.4% were married-couple households, 17.8% were households with a male householder and no spouse or partner present, and 32.1% were households with a female householder and no spouse or partner present. About 34.0% of all households were made up of individuals and 19.3% had someone living alone who was 65 years of age or older.

There were 1,627 housing units, of which 47.5% were vacant. The homeowner vacancy rate was 0.3% and the rental vacancy rate was 0.0%.

Racial composition as of the 2020 census
Race	Number	Percent
White	1,447	87.0%
Black or African American	44	2.6%
American Indian and Alaska Native	9	0.5%
Asian	29	1.7%
Native Hawaiian and Other Pacific Islander	1	0.1%
Some other race	28	1.7%
Two or more races	105	6.3%
Hispanic or Latino (of any race)	42	2.5%

=== 2000 census ===
As of the 2000 census, there were 1,907 people, 908 households, and 550 families residing in Teaticket. The population density was 701.2/km^{2} (1,813.6/mi^{2}). There were 1,558 housing units at an average density of 572.9/km^{2} (1,481.7/mi^{2}). The racial makeup of the CDP was 94.23% White, 1.00% African American, 0.37% Native American, 1.36% Asian, 1.36% from other races, and 1.68% from two or more races. Hispanic or Latino of any race were 1.21% of the population.

There were 908 households, out of which 15.4% had children under the age of 18 living with them, 48.0% were married couples living together, 9.9% had a female householder with no husband present, and 39.4% were non-families. 34.4% of all households were made up of individuals, and 18.8% had someone living alone who was 65 years of age or older. The average household size was 2.07 and the average family size was 2.63.

In the CDP, the population was spread out, with 16.2% under the age of 18, 4.4% from 18 to 24, 19.7% from 25 to 44, 28.7% from 45 to 64, and 31.0% who were 65 years of age or older. The median age was 53 years. For every 100 females, there were 77.6 males. For every 100 females age 18 and over, there were 77.7 males.

The median income for a household in the CDP was $41,272, and the median income for a family was $46,705. Males had a median income of $37,107 versus $25,642 for females. The per capita income for the CDP was $24,008. About 3.5% of families and 5.0% of the population were below the poverty line, including 5.8% of those under age 18 and 4.8% of those age 65 or over.
