= Massachusetts Route 151 =

State highway in Barnstable County, Massachusetts, US

Route 151
- Route 151 highlighted in red

Route information
- Maintained by MassDOT
- Length: 7 mi (11 km)

Major junctions
- West end: Route 28A in Falmouth
- Route 28 in Falmouth
- East end: Route 28 in Mashpee

Location
- Country: United States
- State: Massachusetts
- Counties: Barnstable

Highway system
- Massachusetts State Highway System; Interstate; US; State
← Route 150	→ Route 152

Route 151 is a 7-mile-long (11 km) east–west state highway in Massachusetts. The route is located on Cape Cod and runs through the towns of Falmouth and Mashpee.

Route 151 essentially acts as a bypass of the busier Route 28 through Falmouth and Mashpee centers. The route provides a more direct link for those wishing to travel from North Falmouth to Hyannis. In conjunction with Route 28, Route 151 also serves as an alternate route of U.S. Route 6 for those wishing to travel from the Bourne Bridge to Hyannis.

== Route description ==
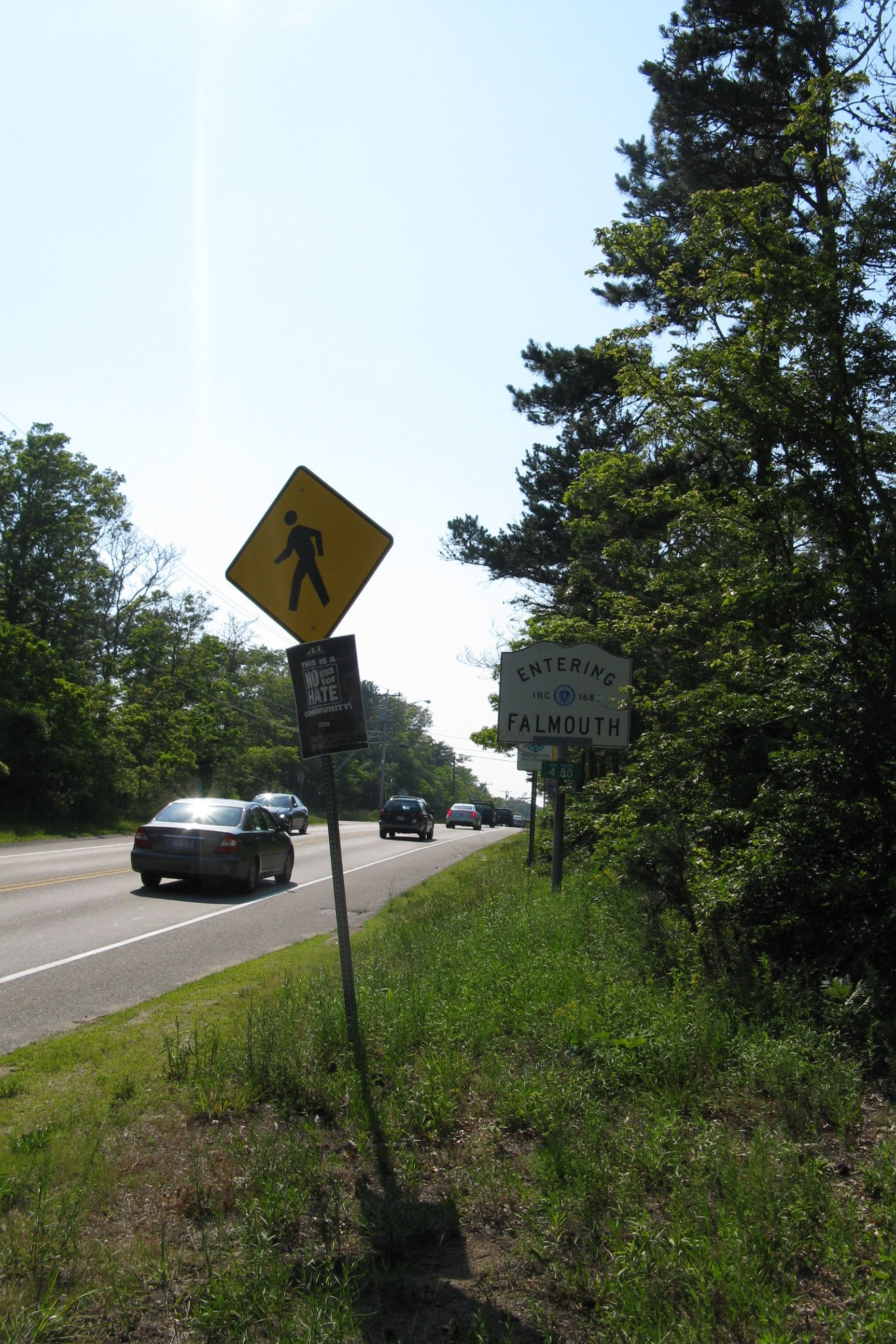
Route 151 westbound entering Falmouth

Route 151 begins at an intersection with Route 28A in North Falmouth. The roadway continues west from this intersection towards Buzzards Bay, but that portion is not signed as Route 151.

Route 151 proceeds east, and intersects with the freeway portion of Route 28 approximately 0.5-mile (0.80 km) thereafter. The highway then proceeds eastward through the northern portion of Falmouth, roughly parallel to the town line between Falmouth and Bourne. Route 151 passes the village of Hatchville and the Barnstable County Fairgrounds, continuing east until it enters the town of Mashpee.

The highway passes many of Mashpee's municipal buildings, including the fire department, the police department, and the town library. As Route 151 approaches its eastern terminus, it becomes much more heavily developed, passing between and dividing the north and south sections of the Mashpee Commons shopping center. Just past Mashpee Commons, Route 151 ends at a rotary close to the geographic center of town, where it once again intersects with Route 28 (which is now running east–west).

== Major intersections ==
The entire route is in Barnstable County.

Location	mi	km	Destinations	Notes
Falmouth	0.0	0.0	Route 28A (North Falmouth Highway) – Old Silver Beach, West Falmouth	Western terminus
Falmouth	0.4	0.64	Route 28 – Bourne Bridge, Boston, Falmouth, Woods Hole	Partial cloverleaf interchange; proposed exit 56
Mashpee	7.0	11.3	Route 28 – Falmouth, Woods Hole, Hyannis, Chatham	Eastern terminus; rotary
1.000 mi = 1.609 km; 1.000 km = 0.621 mi
