= Menauhant, Massachusetts =

Neighborhood in East Falmouth, Massachusetts, US

Coordinates: 41°33′15″N 70°33′00″W

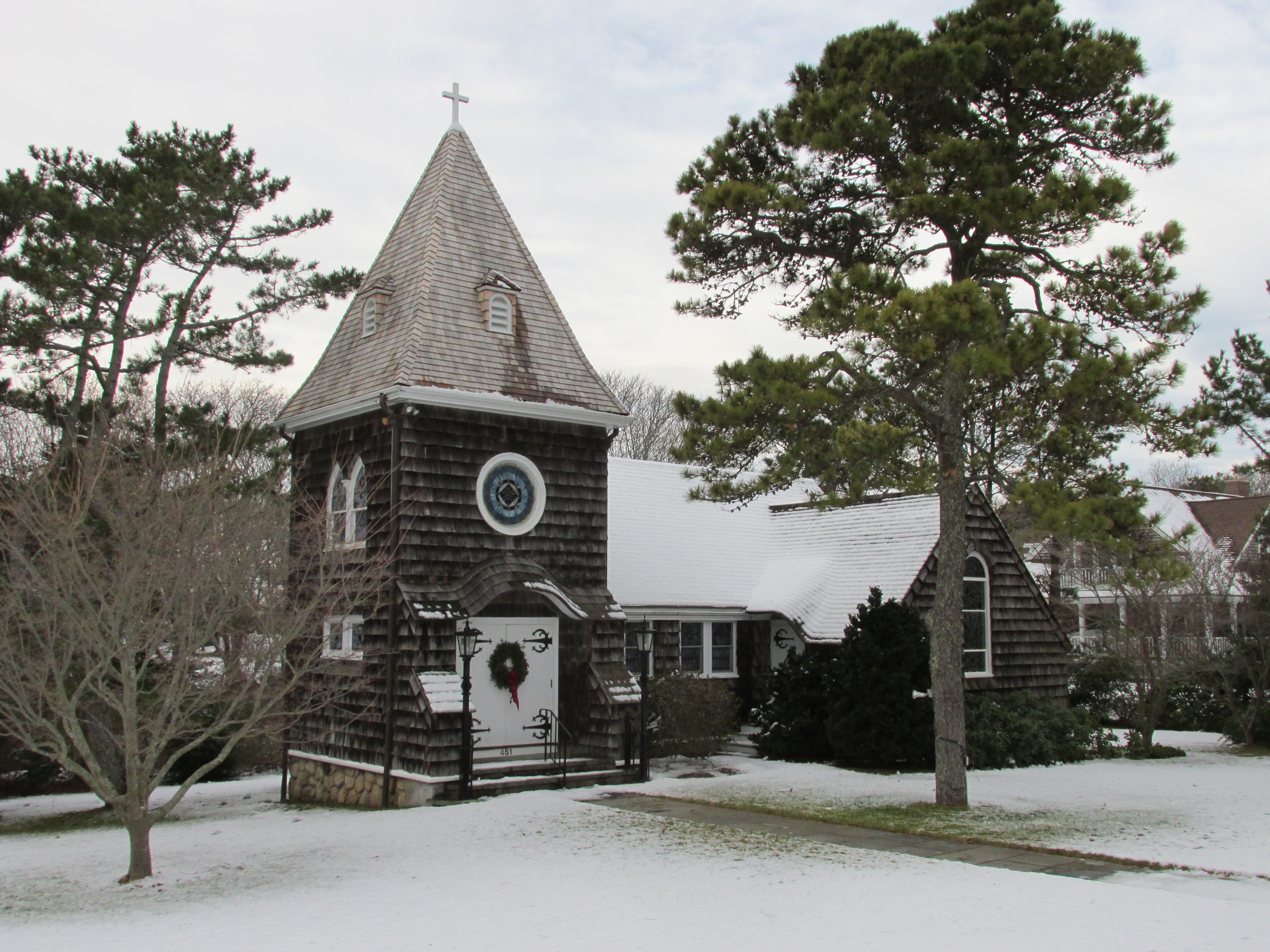
Chapel at corner of Bayberry Road and Central Avenue

Menauhant (/məˈnɒt/ mə-NOT) is a neighborhood at the southern end of Central Avenue in East Falmouth, Massachusetts, United States. The community, which lies between Bournes Pond on the west and Eel Pond on the east, is located across Vineyard Sound from Martha's Vineyard. The community has approximately 105 homes, the earliest of which date to the 1870s, a small chapel that serves the community during the summer months, and the public Menauhant Beach. The neighborhood is the home of the Menauhant Yacht Club, which owns two private beaches, tennis courts and several boats, and hosts a summer program for members.
