= Massachusetts Route 28 =

Highway in Massachusetts

Route 28
- Route 28 highlighted in red, Route 28A highlighted in blue

Route information
- Maintained by MassDOT
- Length: 151.93 mi (244.51 km)
- Existed: 1922–present

Major junctions
- South end: US 6 / Route 6A in Eastham
- US 6 / Route 25 in Bourne; I-195 in Wareham; I-495 in Middleborough; US 44 in Middleborough; I-93 / US 1 in Randolph; I-93 / US 1 / Route 2 / Route 3 / Route 9 in Boston; I-95 / Route 128 in Reading; I-495 in Andover; Route 213 in Methuen
- North end: NH 28 at the New Hampshire state line in Methuen

Location
- Country: United States
- State: Massachusetts
- Counties: Barnstable, Plymouth, Norfolk, Suffolk, Middlesex, Essex

Highway system
- Massachusetts State Highway System; Interstate; US; State
← Route 27	→ Route 30
← Route 26	N.E.	→ Route 30

Route 28 is a 151.93-mile-long (244.51 km) nominally south–north state highway in the U.S. state of Massachusetts, running from the town of Eastham via Boston to the New Hampshire state line in Methuen. Following the route from its nominally southern end, Route 28 initially heads south to the town of Chatham then turns west to follow along the south shore of Cape Cod. In Falmouth, Route 28 turns north and continues through the western part of Plymouth County and the eastern part of Norfolk County; it then passes through downtown Boston before heading north via Lawrence to the New Hampshire state line, where it continues as New Hampshire Route 28.

Route 28 was originally formed as a New England interstate route established in 1922 to run from Buzzards Bay to New Hampshire. The route itself was overlaid on several early turnpike roads constructed in the early 19th century. Except for an extension into Cape Cod in 1926, the overall highway layout and routing is largely unchanged from its original design. Route 28 has been realigned in several places when newer, higher quality roads were built. At a length of nearly 152 miles (245 km), Route 28 is the longest state numbered highway in Massachusetts, and the second longest highway, behind U.S. Route 20.

Route 28 is supplanted by interstate highways throughout most of the state, and is used mainly as a secondary and local highway. Throughout Cape Cod, particularly in Hyannis and Yarmouth, it passes through heavy development and is the primary navigation route along the south side of the Cape. This causes congestion and gridlock, especially during the summer months, when traffic is at its heaviest.

== Route description ==
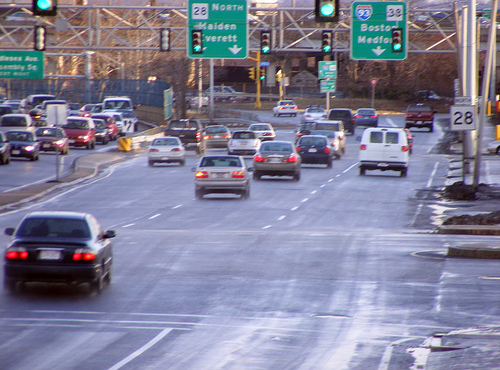
McGrath Highway (Route 28) in Somerville.

Route 28 is mostly a two or four-lane undivided highway, with several divided, four-lane sections in populated areas as well as three short freeway sections. The south end of Route 28 is at the Orleans Rotary just north of the Orleans-Eastham town line, where it intersects with U.S. Route 6 and Route 6A. Northbound Route 28 initially heads south towards the town of Chatham before turning west to run along the south shore of Cape Cod until Falmouth. From there, Route 28 turns north, running for several miles along a four-lane freeway, later downgrading to a four-lane arterial road. Route 28 then becomes a four-lane undivided freeway and crosses the Cape Cod Canal via the Bourne Bridge, from which it then overlaps with U.S. Route 6 as a two-lane highway until Wareham. North of Wareham, Route 28 heads north towards Boston passing through the southern suburbs of the city, including Middleborough, Bridgewater, Brockton, and Randolph. After crossing Interstate 93, Route 28 then goes through the Blue Hills Reservation and Milton before crossing into Boston over the Neponset River. 28 starts on Blue Hill Avenue and transfers to Seaver Street which turns into Columbus Avenue. It then transfers to Tremont St, Melnea Cass Blvd, and back into Columbus Avenue. In Boston proper, northbound Route 28 uses Columbus Avenue, Stuart Street, Charles Street South, and Beacon Street, then shifts via the David G. Mugar Way to Embankment Road. As Stuart Street and Charles Street South are both one way, the southbound routing runs west on Beacon Street from Mugar Way to Clarendon Street, where it turns south, meets routes 2 and 9, until it reaches Columbus Avenue. At the junction with the Longfellow Bridge, Route 28 is joined briefly by Route 3 on a wrong-way concurrency until the Charles River Dam Bridge. Route 28 crosses the Charles River on the Charles River Dam Bridge into Cambridge. After crossing the river, Route 28 runs along the six-lane divided highway known as Monsignor O'Brien Highway (in Cambridge) and McGrath Highway (in Somerville) to connect to the Fellsway. Roughly half of the McGrath Highway is an elevated freeway through East Somerville, while being supplemented by at-grade frontage roads. The four-lane Fellsway crosses the Mystic River into Medford. Route 28 continues north through the Middlesex Fells Reservation and the northern suburbs of Boston, including Reading, Andover, Lawrence (crossing the Merrimack River via the O'Leary Bridge), and Methuen, from which it then crosses into the state of New Hampshire.

== History ==
=== Early turnpikes ===
Many of the roads leading from Boston to the surrounding towns were first laid out as privately owned and operated turnpikes at the beginning of the 19th century. One of the roads used by modern Route 28 leading from the northern suburbs of Boston in the direction of Manchester, New Hampshire was the Andover and Medford Turnpike. The turnpike corporation was chartered in June 1805 and had authority to build from the marketplace in Medford to a point in the town of Andover. A committee of Middlesex County freeholders established the location of the road in 1806, and the road was constructed soon after at a cost of almost $49,000 for a length of about six miles, being built only as far north as the Reading-Stoneham town line, where a branch of the Essex Turnpike continued the road to Andover and the state of New Hampshire. An act by the General Court in February 1807 allowed the Andover and Medford company to maintain a toll gate at the Essex-Middlesex county line jointly with the Essex Turnpike corporation. The road continued collecting tolls until January 1836 when Middlesex county commissioners declared the road a public road and awarded the company $3,000 as compensation.

In March 1804, another turnpike corporation, the Blue Hill Turnpike Corporation, was chartered with authority to lay out an improved road from the meeting house in the town of Randolph, through the Blue Hills Reservation, to a point in the town of Milton. A second act in June 1805 allowed for a slight alteration in the terminus in Milton. The road cost approximately $78,300 to build the eight miles from Randolph Center to Milton Lower Mills in 1805. The turnpike used what is now North Main Street in Randolph and Randolph Avenue in Milton. The road from Milton Lower Mills into Boston was continued by the Dorchester Turnpike. In 1815, the Blue Hills Turnpike company was allowed to impose a fine on any persons who tried to avoid paying the tolls. The turnpike was discontinued in 1848, when the Norfolk county commissioners declared the road as a public highway. The company reported an average net income of 1-2 per cent per year during its existence.

Two other sections of modern Route 28 were also parts of early turnpikes. The section between Middleborough and Bridgewater, where Route 28 overlaps with Route 18, was part of the New Bedford and Bridgewater Turnpike. The portion along Blue Hill Avenue, between the village of Mattapan and Franklin Park Zoo, was the northern half of the Brush Hill Turnpike (the lower half is modern Route 138). In Cape Cod, most travel was by water and roads were not improved until late in the 19th century.

=== Route numbering and original alignment ===
In 1922, the New England states adopted a region-wide road marking system. Primary routes were to be assigned route numbers between 1 and 99 and marked as black numerals on yellow bands painted on poles along the route. The route running from Wareham, Massachusetts and Ossipee, New Hampshire via Boston and Manchester, New Hampshire was designated as New England Route 28. Route 28 utilized the main road between Wareham and Middleborough (Wareham Street), from which it then traveled along Everett Street and Summer Street until the center of Bridgewater. From Bridgewater, Route 28 used the main road to Brockton (Main Street). In Brockton, Route 28 shifted slightly west to use Warren Avenue (between Clifton and Pleasant streets) and North Main Street (to the town of Avon). From Randolph, it then went along the alignment of the old Blue Hill Turnpike but left the turnpike alignment before reaching Milton Village, shifting westward to a section of the Brush Hill Turnpike (Blue Hill Avenue) in Mattapan. In Mattapan, it joined with New England Route 6 (modern Route 203) and went west along Morton Street and the Arborway until they met with New England Route 1 at Centre Street in Jamaica Plain.

The triple-concurrency of Routes 1, 6, and 28 continued through the Emerald Necklace following the Jamaicaway, the Riverway, and a short section of Boylston Street to Charlesgate, and then crossed the Charles River using the Harvard Bridge. After crossing the river, Route 6 split off to the west along Memorial Drive, while Routes 1 and 28 followed local streets in Cambridge and Somerville (Windsor Avenue, Webster Avenue, Walnut Street) to reach the Fellsway. The two routes crossed the Mystic River on the Fellsway and split at the intersection with the Revere Beach Parkway. From there, Route 28 continued along the Fellsway towards Medford Center. North of Medford, Route 28 utilized the alignment of the old Andover and Medford Turnpike through the Middlesex Fells Reservation into Reading. It then continued on the Andover branch of the old Essex Turnpike through Andover and Lawrence to the New Hampshire state line.

The route on Cape Cod was also assigned in 1922 as a primary New England route. The road from Bourne to Orleans along the south shore of the Cape was the easternmost section of New England Route 3.Th

At the end of 1926, the U.S. Highway system was established and several of the primary New England routes were redesignated as U.S. routes. New England Route 28 was not renumbered but New England Route 1 became U.S. Route 1; New England Route 6 became U.S. Route 3 north of Boston and mostly State Route 3 south of Boston; and New England Route 3 became mostly U.S. Route 6. In Cape Cod, however, this was not the case. Former New England Route 3 was assigned as a southern extension of Route 28, while former New England Route 6 was assigned as an eastern extension of U.S. Route 6.

=== Realignments ===
Driving the entire length from New Hampshire to Orleans, the highway layout and design has not changed much since its construction and designation in the early 20th century. The major exceptions are in Boston, where some of the original routing was changed over the years, and on the Cape, where a freeway section between Falmouth and Bourne was completed in the mid-1960s.

In 1928, several projects to relieve congestion in the Boston area were completed. One of these was the opening of the Boston University Bridge (at the time known as Cottage Farm Bridge). The opening of this new bridge over the Charles River resulted in the relocation of the triple concurrency of US 1, US 3, and Route 28 onto it. The routes left the Riverway using Park Drive and Mountfort Street (both now designated as part of Route 2) to reach the bridge. In Cambridge and Somerville, a new boulevard known as the Northern Artery was built over part of Somerville Avenue and Medford Street, continuing north on a new roadway cutting across Somerville to Fellsway East, which was also paved over by the new Northern Artery. The Northern Artery provided a high speed connection between the Charles River and the Mystic River. US 1 and Route 28 were relocated off of local streets in Cambridge and Somerville onto the Northern Artery when it opened to traffic. From the Boston University Bridge, the two routes used Memorial Drive and Cambridge Parkway to reach the Northern Artery. The Northern Artery was later renamed as the Monsignor O'Brien Highway in Cambridge and the McGrath Highway in Somerville.

In the mid-1930s, the city of Boston marked several alternate routes of Routes 1, 9, 28, and 37 that ran through the downtown area. Route C28 left mainline Route 28 by continuing north into Dorchester along Blue Hill Avenue instead of turning west onto Morton Street with Route 3. Just beyond the Franklin Zoo, C28 turned west along Seaver Street, continuing through Roxbury along Columbus Avenue. C28 then followed Columbus Avenue up to Charles Street at the Boston Common, turning north along Charles Street to Cambridge Street, then crossing the Charles River using the Longfellow Bridge. C28 met back with mainline Route 28 at Memorial Drive in Cambridge. In 1971, the Boston 'C' routes were retired and mainline Route 28 was relocated onto the former C28 alignment through downtown Boston. Route 28 was also later shifted to use its modern alignment along Embankment Road and the Charles River Dam Bridge.

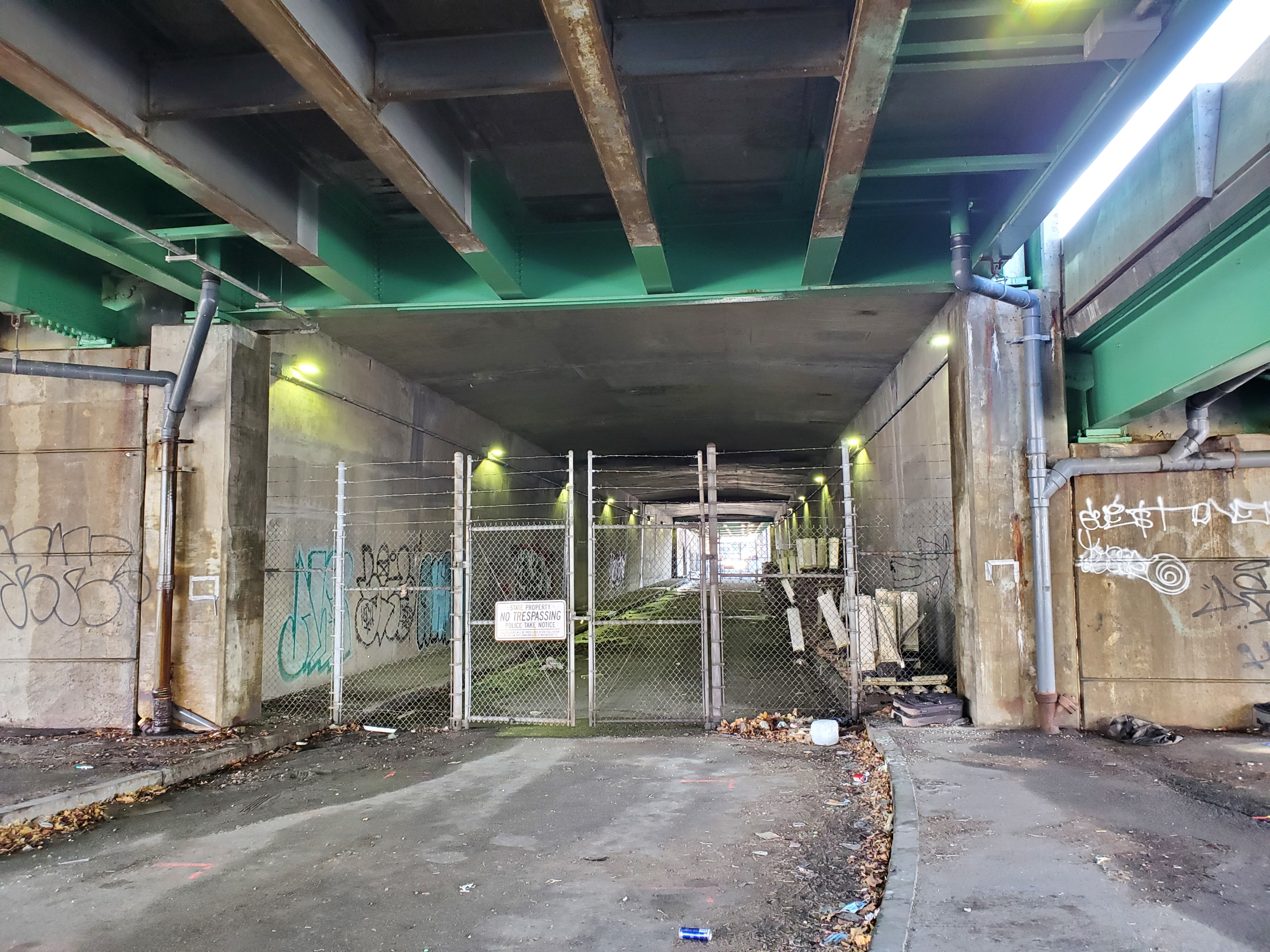
The 2016-closed McGrath Highway "tunnel"

The McCarthy Overpass, which carries Route 28 as McGrath Highway through part of Somerville, was built in the early 1950s, before Interstate 93. The parallel Northern Expressway segment connecting Medford (where I-93 ended in 1963) and the Central Artery was constructed between 1965 and 1973. As the McCarthy Overpass reached the end of its expected life, the Massachusetts Department of Transportation announced in 2013 the preferred replacement was a ground-level boulevard. The project is expected to cost $100 million and is programmed with state and federal money for 2027-2030; as of 2024, work on producing the 25% design was underway. Temporary repairs were made in the meantime to protect the structural integrity of the bridge. The southbound off-ramp to Somerville Avenue, and a northbound "tunnel" under the overpass north of Somerville Avenue, were closed on April 11, 2016.

In 1935, a new bridge over the Cape Cod Canal, the Bourne Bridge, was opened to traffic, replacing an earlier drawbridge at the same location. Between 1941 and 1943, the road south of the Bourne Bridge was widened to a four-lane, divided highway to the Pocasset Rotary and renamed General MacArthur Boulevard. The Route 28 expressway in Falmouth opened to traffic in 1961. Route 28 was relocated to the new expressway soon after, with the former surface alignment being renumbered to Route 28A.

Around 1940, several minor realignments had also taken place in Brockton, Bridgewater, and Middleborough. In Brockton, Route 28 followed Montello Street instead of Warren Avenue. South of Bridgewater, Route 28 was relocated onto an overlap with Route 18 until West Grove Street. Route 28 then followed West Grove Street and East Grove Street, bypassing Middleborough Center to the south. By 1951, a new bypass road in Buzzards Bay was completed and resulted in the relocation of Routes 6 and 28 to the new roadway.

Route 28 itself is no longer utilized as a long distance through route because of the opening of several parallel expressways along the Route 28 corridor since the 1950s. Interstate 93 serves the Route 28 corridor north of Boston, while the combination of Route 24, the southern end of Interstate 495, and Route 25 serves the corridor south of Boston to the Bourne Bridge. The construction of Route 25, in particular, resulted in a reconfiguration of the connection from the Bourne Corners traffic circle to the Route 25 expressway.

== Major intersections ==
County	Location	mi	km	Exit	Destinations	Notes
Barnstable	Eastham	0.00	0.00		US 6 / Route 6A east – Eastham, Provincetown, Hyannis, Boston	Orleans Rotary; southern terminus; access to Rock Harbor; southern end of Route 6A concurrency
Barnstable	Orleans	0.54	0.87		Route 6A west – Brewster	Northern end of Route 6A concurrency
Barnstable	Orleans	3.44	5.54		Route 39 south – Harwich, Hyannis	Northern terminus of Route 39
Barnstable	Chatham	12.99	20.91		Route 137 north – East Harwich, Brewster	Southern terminus of Route 137
Barnstable	Harwich	17.15	27.60		Route 39 north / Route 124 north – Harwich Center, Brewster, Orleans	Southern terminus of Route 39/Route 124
Barnstable	Dennis	20.23	32.56		Route 134 north – South Dennis, Dennis	Southern terminus of Route 134
Barnstable	Barnstable	28.33	45.59		Route 132 north to US 6 / Barnstable Road – Boston	Roundabout; southern terminus of Route 132
Barnstable	Barnstable	34.90	56.17		Route 149 north – Marstons Mills, West Barnstable	Southern terminus of Route 149
Barnstable	Barnstable	37.19	59.85		Route 130 north – Mashpee, Sandwich	Southern terminus of Route 130
Barnstable	Mashpee	39.50	63.57		Route 151 west / Great Neck Road – North Falmouth, Bourne	Roundabout; eastern terminus of Route 151
Barnstable	Falmouth	51.32	82.59	Southern end of freeway section		
Barnstable	Falmouth	51.32	82.59	–	Route 28A north – Sippewissett	Southbound exit and entrance; southern terminus of Route 28A; proposed Exit 51^{a}
Barnstable	Falmouth	52.02	83.72	–	Brick Kiln Road – West Falmouth, East Falmouth	No southbound entrance; proposed exit 52^{a}
Barnstable	Falmouth	53.62	86.29	–	Thomas B. Landers Road – West Falmouth, Old Silver Beach	Proposed exit 54^{a}
Barnstable	Falmouth	55.71	89.66	–	Route 151 – Mashpee, North Falmouth	Proposed exit 56^{a}
Barnstable	Bourne	58.59	94.29	Northern end of freeway section		
Barnstable	Bourne	58.59	94.29		Route 28A south / Conners Avenue – Joint Base Cape Cod	Roundabout; northern terminus of Route 28A
Barnstable	Bourne	62.72	100.94		To US 6 / Sandwich Road / Trowbridge Road – Hyannis, Bourne Village	Bourne Rotary
Barnstable	Bourne	62.72	100.94	Southern end of freeway section		
Barnstable	Bourne	63.06	101.49	Bourne Bridge over the Cape Cod Canal		
Barnstable	Bourne	63.46	102.13	Route 25 begins		
Barnstable	Bourne	63.81	102.69	10	Route 25 west to I-195 west / I-495 north – Boston	Northern end of Route 25 concurrency
Barnstable	Bourne	63.81	102.69	Northern end of freeway section		
Barnstable	Bourne	64.59	103.95		US 6 east to Route 3 north – Hyannis, Provincetown, Plymouth, Buzzards Bay	Buzzards Bay Rotary; southern end of US 6 concurrency
Plymouth	Wareham	68.85	110.80		Route 25 east – Cape Cod	Access via Glen Charlie Road
Plymouth	Wareham	69.05	111.13		US 6 west – Wareham, Marion	Northern end of US 6 concurrency
Plymouth	Wareham	69.29	111.51		Route 25 west – Providence, RI, Boston	Access via Maple Springs Road
Plymouth	Wareham	72.68	116.97		I-195 to I-495 north / Route 25 east – Marion, New Bedford	Exit 39 on I-195
Plymouth	Rochester	75.33	121.23		Route 58 north to I-495 – Carver, Plympton	Southern terminus of Route 58
Plymouth	Middleborough	80.77	129.99		I-495 – Wareham, Cape Cod, Taunton, Marlboro	Exit 8 on I-495
Plymouth	Middleborough	85.28	137.24		Route 105 – Middleborough, Plymouth, Lakeville	
Plymouth	Middleborough	87.74	141.20		US 44 / Route 18 south to I-495 – Plymouth, Taunton, Marlboro, Lakeville	Roundabout; southern end of Route 18 concurrency
Plymouth	Bridgewater	93.78– 93.85	150.92– 151.04		Route 104 west – Taunton	Southern end of Route 104 concurrency
Plymouth	Bridgewater	93.88	151.09		Route 18 north / Route 104 east – East Bridgewater, Quincy, Kingston	Northern end of Route 18/Route 104 concurrency
Plymouth	West Bridgewater	96.55	155.38		Route 106 – East Bridgewater, Kingston, Easton, Boston	
Plymouth	Brockton	99.83	160.66		Route 27 north / Route 123 east (Crescent Street) – Abington, Norwell	Southern end of Route 27 concurrency
Plymouth	Brockton	100.02	160.97		Route 123 west (Centre Street) – Easton, Attleboro	
Plymouth	Brockton	101.33	163.07		Route 27 south (Pleasant Street) – Whitman, Kingston	Northern end of Route 27 concurrency
Plymouth	Brockton	102.93	165.65		Route 37 north – Holbrook, Braintree	Southern terminus of Route 37
Norfolk	Randolph	106.99– 107.22	172.18– 172.55		Route 139 – Holbrook, Stoughton	
Norfolk	Randolph	110.20	177.35		I-93 / US 1 to I-95 (Route 128 north) – Braintree, Boston, Canton	Exit 5 on I-93; former Route 128
Norfolk	Milton	115.10	185.24		Route 138 south – Canton, Stoughton	Northern terminus of Route 138
Suffolk	Boston	116.42	187.36		Route 203 (Morton Street) – Quincy	
Suffolk	Boston	121.66	195.79		Clarendon Street	Southern terminus of directional split in Downtown Boston
Suffolk	Boston	121.94	196.24		Route 9 west (Stuart Street) to I-90 / Mass Pike – V.A. Hospital, Worcester	Eastern terminus of Route 9 at Route 28 south; no access from Route 28 north
Suffolk	Boston	122.24– 122.65	196.73– 197.39		Route 2 west (Commonwealth Avenue / Boylston Street) – Cambridge, Fitchburg	Eastern terminus of Route 2
Suffolk	Boston	122.67	197.42		David G. Mugar Way	Northern terminus of directional split
Suffolk	Boston				Storrow Drive west	Interchange
Suffolk	Boston	123.00	197.95		Route 3 north – Government Center, Kendall Square, Cambridge	Interchange; southern end of Route 3 concurrency
Suffolk	Boston	123.38	198.56		I-93 north / US 1 north (Tobin Bridge) – Concord, NH	Interchange; access via Leverett Connector
Suffolk	Boston	123.48	198.72		Route 3 south to I-93 / US 1 south / Callahan Tunnel south – Logan Airport, Quincy	Northern end of Route 3 concurrency
Charles River					Charles River Dam Bridge	
Middlesex	Somerville				Somerville Avenue	Interchange
Middlesex	Somerville				Washington Street	Interchange
Middlesex	Somerville	126.03	202.83		I-93 / Route 38 – Boston, Woburn	Exit 21 on I-93
Middlesex	Mystic River				Wellington Bridge (southern terminus of Fellsway)	
Middlesex	Medford	126.84	204.13		Route 16 – Chelsea, Revere, Arlington, Waltham	Wellington Circle
Middlesex	Malden				Fellsway East	Fellsway becomes Fellsway West
Middlesex	Medford	128.35	206.56		Route 60 – Malden, Revere, Medford, Waltham	
Middlesex	Medford	129.21	207.94		I-93 – Boston, Reading	Roosevelt Circle; exit 24 on I-93
Middlesex	Stoneham	130.84	210.57		I-93 south – Boston	Exit 25 on I-93; northern terminus of Fellsway West
Middlesex	Reading	134.47	216.41		I-95 / Route 128 – Peabody, Newburyport, Waltham, Providence, RI	Exits 56A-B on I-95
Middlesex	Reading	136.02	218.90		Route 129 (Salem Street)	
Middlesex	North Reading	139.67– 139.86	224.78– 225.08		Route 62 – North Reading, Beverly, Wilmington, Bedford	
Essex	Andover	141.67	228.00		Route 125 to I-93 – North Andover, Haverhill, Wilmington	Interchange
Essex	Andover	146.54	235.83		Route 133 – North Andover, Haverhill, Lowell, Georgetown	
Essex	Andover	147.05	236.65		I-495 – Haverhill, Salisbury, Lowell, Marlboro	Exit 99 on I-495
Essex	Lawrence	148.43	238.87		Route 114 east – North Andover, Middleton	Western terminus of Route 114
Essex	Lawrence	149.31	240.29		Route 110 – Lowell, Haverhill, Amesbury	
Essex	Methuen	150.90	242.85		Route 113	
Essex	Methuen	151.27	243.45		Route 213 to I-93 / I-495 – Boston, Concord, NH, Haverhill	Exit 2 on Route 213
Essex	Methuen	151.93	244.51		NH 28 north – Salem	Continuation into New Hampshire
1.000 mi = 1.609 km; 1.000 km = 0.621 mi: Concurrency terminus; Incomplete access

== Route 28A ==
Route 28A
- Location: Falmouth–Bourne
- Length: 7.9 mi (12.7 km)
- Existed: 1961–present

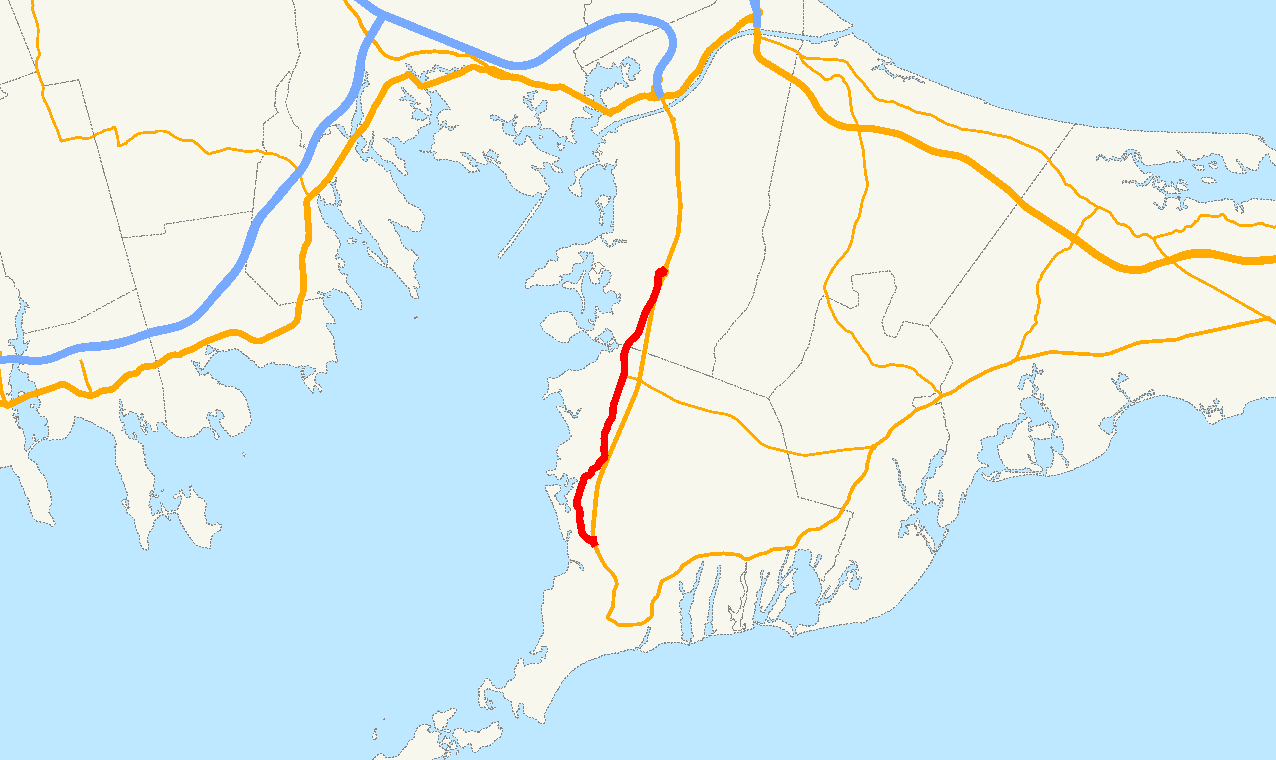
Map of Route 28A

Route 28A is a 7.9-mile (12.7 km) alternate route running from Falmouth in the south to the village of Pocasset in the north. Route 28A parallels the freeway section of Route 28 in the Upper Cape, providing a scenic alternative for travelers and direct access to the localities bypassed by the freeway. Route 28A begins and ends at Route 28 with an intermediate junction with Route 151.

The highway was part of Route 28 until paralleling General MacArthur Boulevard expressway opened to traffic in 1961.

Major intersections

The entire route is in Barnstable County.

Location	mi	km	Destinations	Notes
Falmouth	0.0	0.0	Route 28 south – Woods Hole, Falmouth	Right in/right out interchange with Route 28 south
Falmouth	2.8	4.5	To Route 28 – Falmouth, Boston	Via Thomas B Landers Road
Falmouth	4.9	7.9	Route 151 east – Mashpee, Hyannis, North Falmouth	Western terminus of Route 151
Bourne	7.9	12.7	Route 28 / Connery Avenue – Falmouth, Woods Hole, Bourne, Wareham, Joint Base Cape Cod	Otis Rotary
1.000 mi = 1.609 km; 1.000 km = 0.621 mi

== See also ==
- Route 28 (New England)
