= Falmouth (CDP), Massachusetts =

Falmouth, Massachusetts
- Census-designated place
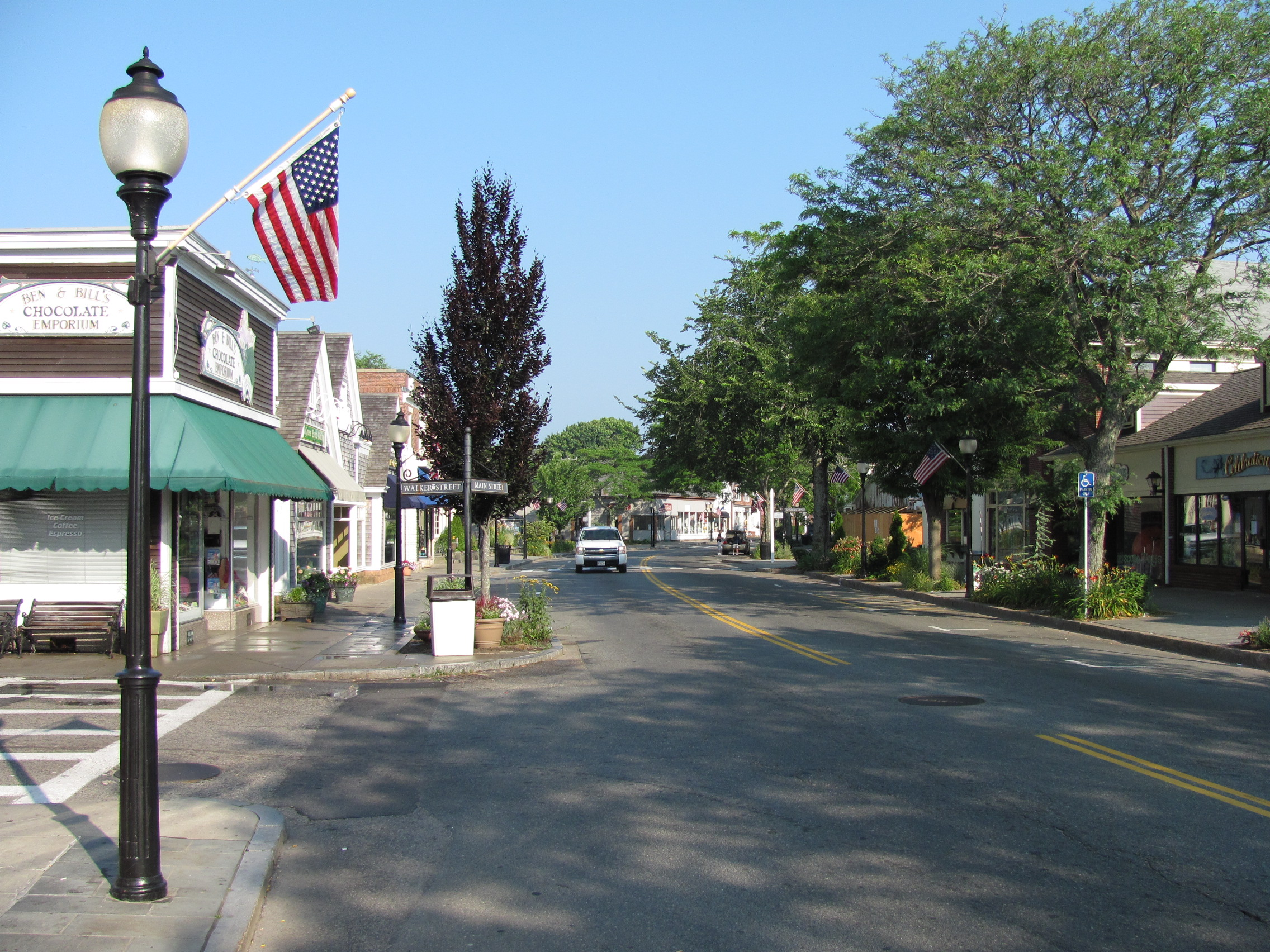
- Main Street

- Location in Barnstable County and the state of Massachusetts.
- Coordinates: 41°32′55″N 70°36′17″W
- Country: United States
- State: Massachusetts
- County: Barnstable
- Town: Falmouth

Area
  - Total: 2.25 sq mi (5.84 km^{2})
  - Land: 2.09 sq mi (5.41 km^{2})
  - Water: 0.17 sq mi (0.43 km^{2})
- Elevation: 6.6 ft (2 m)

Population (2020)
  - Total: 3,818
  - Density: 1,828.6/sq mi (706.03/km^{2})
- Time zone: UTC-5 (Eastern (EST))
  - Summer (DST): UTC-4 (EDT)
- ZIP Codes: 02540, 02541
- Area code: 508
- FIPS code: 25-23070
- GNIS feature ID: 0616278

Falmouth is a census-designated place (CDP) consisting of the primary settlement in the town of Falmouth in Barnstable County, Massachusetts, United States. The population of the CDP was 3,799 at the 2010 census, out of 31,532 in the town as a whole. It was named after Falmouth, Cornwall, England.

== Geography ==
Falmouth CDP is located in the southern part of Falmouth town at 41°32′54″N 70°36′17″W (41.548504, -70.604842). It is bordered to the east by the Teaticket CDP and to the south by Vineyard Sound. Woods Hole is to the southwest, and West Falmouth is to the northwest. Massachusetts Route 28 (Palmer Avenue and Main Street) is the main road through the community.

According to the United States Census Bureau, the CDP has a total area of 2.2 square miles (5.8 km^{2}), of which 2.1 square miles (5.4 km^{2}) is land, and 0.15 square miles (0.4 km^{2}) (7.50%) is water.

== Demographics ==
Historical population
Census	Pop.	Note	%±
2020	3,818		—
U.S. Decennial Census

As of the census of 2000, there were 4,115 people, 2,125 households, and 988 families residing in the CDP. The population density was 767.5 people/km^{2} (1,988 people/mi^{2}). There were 3,088 housing units at an average density of 576.0 units/km^{2} (1,492 units/mi^{2}). The racial makeup of the CDP was 94.97% White, 1.43% Black or African American, 0.44% Native American, 0.92% Asian, 1.17% from other races, and 1.07% from two or more races. Hispanic or Latino of any race were 1.29% of the population.

There were 2,125 households, out of which 13.3% had children under the age of 18 living with them, 36.5% were married couples living together, 8.1% had a female householder with no husband present, and 53.5% were non-families. 47.8% of all households were made up of individuals, and 26.7% had someone living alone who was 65 years of age or older. The average household size was 1.81 and the average family size was 2.57.

In the CDP, the population was spread out, with 12.5% under the age of 18, 3.2% from 18 to 24, 21.7% from 25 to 44, 26.5% from 45 to 64, and 36.1% who were 65 years of age or older. The median age was 54 years. For every 100 females, there were 76.7 males. For every 100 females age 18 and over, there were 72.5 males.

The median income for a household in the CDP was $34,286, and the median income for a family was $47,500. Males had a median income of $41,899 versus $30,088 for females. The per capita income for the CDP was $26,292. About 5.9% of families and 8.9% of the population were below the poverty line, including 8.2% of those under age 18 and 9.1% of those age 65 or over.
