= Rock Harbor (Massachusetts) =

Man-made harbor

Coordinates: 41°47′59″N 70°00′23″W

Rock Harbor is a man-made harbor on Cape Cod Bay located on the border between Orleans, Massachusetts, and Eastham, Massachusetts.

A small commercial and charter fishing fleet docks in the harbor. The harbor is an artificial harbor and is dredged to maintain a depth of 4 feet at low tide.

== Battle of Rock Harbor (also known as the Battle of Orleans) ==
Rock Harbor was the site of a skirmish during the War of 1812 between British soldiers and local militia December 19, 1814.

During the occupation of the British off the coast of Cape Cod, a naval ship by the name of HMS Newscastle ran aground in the Billingsgate Shoal of Wellfleet on December 12, 1814. Equipment was thrown overboard to lighten the load so the ship could get off the shoal. The equipment floated down Cape Cod Bay to Rock Harbor where citizens destroyed some and harbored other items. On December 13 the British sent a vessel to Orleans in an attempt to retrieve the equipment. Finding the sloop Camel that had evaded the British blockade, full of provisions for the militia. The Camel was seized and a prisoner was charged with piloting the boat, but the American ran the boat aground in Wellfleet, where the provisions were re-captured and British soldiers taken prison and sent to Boston.

On December 19 the British returned to Orleans and set fire to two boats in Rock Harbor which were extinguished by citizens. A schooner in the harbor, the Betsey, was captured by the British and an American prisoner charged with piloting it to Provincetown. The prisoner ran the seized boat aground at Yarmouth Beach, where the boat was recaptured, and British militia were imprisoned and sent to Salem.
