= Southeastern Massachusetts =

Region of Massachusetts in the United States

- Region of Massachusetts
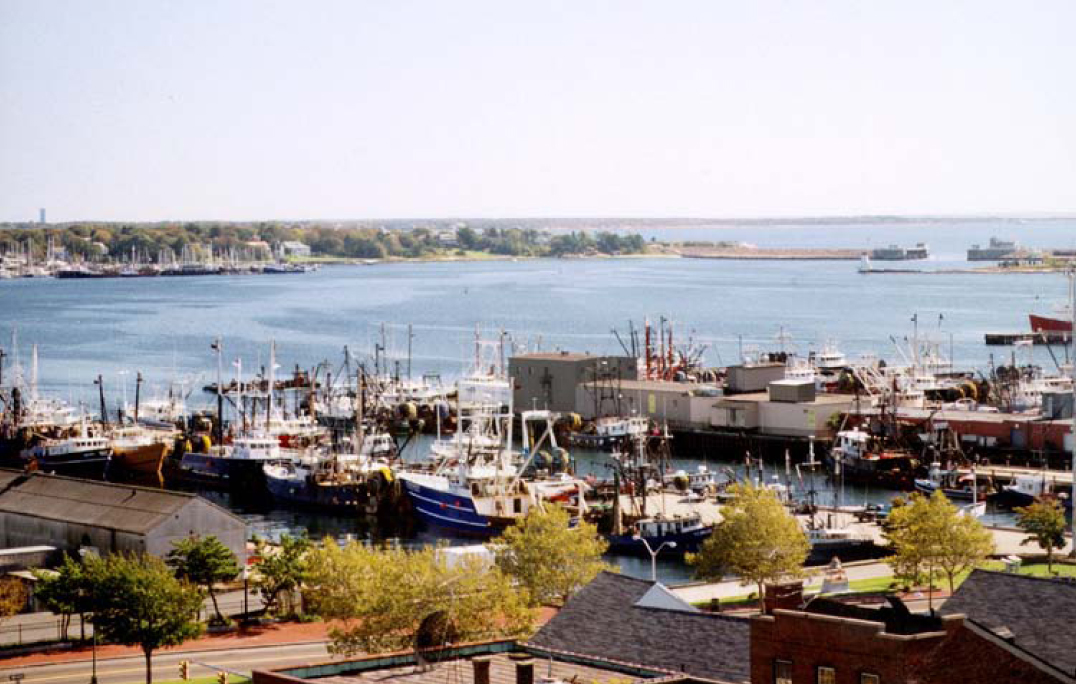
- A view from New Bedford overlooking Buzzards Bay
- Country: United States
- State: Massachusetts
- Largest city (population): Brockton (105,643)
- Largest town (area): Plymouth (134 square miles)
- Subregions: Cape Cod and Islands, South Coast, South Shore (Excluding Hingham and Norfolk County)

Area
  - Total: 4,336.4 sq mi (11,231 km^{2})
  - Land: 2,352.3 sq mi (6,092 km^{2})
  - Water: 1,983.9 sq mi (5,138 km^{2})

Population
  - Total: 2,099,851
  - Density: 892.68/sq mi (344.67/km^{2})

Southeastern Massachusetts is a region of Massachusetts located south of Boston and east of Rhode Island. It is commonly used to describe areas with cultural ties to both Boston and Providence, Rhode Island, and includes the cities of New Bedford and Fall River and their respective suburbs. Despite the location of Cape Cod and the islands to its south, which are the southeasternmost parts of the state, they are not often grouped in this designation. At its broadest definition, it includes all of Massachusetts south of Boston, southeast of Worcester, and east of Providence, Rhode Island, while at its narrowest definition, it is Bristol County and the Western portion of Plymouth County. The region including Cape Cod roughly corresponds with the location of the historic Plymouth Colony, which became part of Massachusetts in 1691.

== Definition ==
As Southeastern Massachusetts is not an official designation, its borders are not exactly defined.

At its broadest definition, it includes all of Plymouth and Bristol counties (particularly the South Coast along Buzzards Bay and the South Shore along Cape Cod Bay), most of the cities and towns in Norfolk County, and even some towns in Worcester County. At its narrowest definition, it includes all of Bristol County, the western part of Plymouth County and the southwestern part of Norfolk County, with the South Shore and Metro-South areas being counted separately.

The terms "Southeastern Massachusetts," "Southeastern New England", and "Southern New England" are much-used by Providence-area broadcasters and other local companies and organizations but are not used as frequently in other parts of Massachusetts.

== Characteristics ==
The Southeastern Regional Planning and Economic Development District (SRPEDD) task force, which concerns Southeastern Massachusetts in its broadest definition, describes:

For this effort, southeastern [sic] Massachusetts is defined as fifty-two cities and towns from Bristol, Plymouth and Norfolk Counties. The region is geographically defined by Massachusetts Bay, Buzzards Bay, The [sic] Taunton River watershed, and its location relative to Boston, Rhode Island and Cape Cod. Bristol County, Massachusetts and Bristol County, Rhode Island are contiguous and are the only counties in the nation where Portuguese Americans make up the plurality of the population. This is due to the Portuguese-American population, the Portuguese-Brazilian population, and the Portuguese-Cape Verdean population that came to Southern New England in the 19th century to do the much needed whaling work; in fact, New Bedford is called "the Whaling City."

...[it] is home to approximately one million people residing in over 1,300 square miles (3,400 km^{2}). We have been adding 10,000 new residents and consuming 4.7 square miles (12 km^{2}) of undeveloped land each year for the past thirty years, and new transportation improvements (commuter rail, Route 44 and Route 3 & 24 improvements) continue to attract more growth. Southeastern Massachusetts comprises several clearly defined sub-regions, including the South Shore, the South Coast and the Tri-City area around Brockton, Attleboro and Taunton. Despite the diversity within the region, the fifty-two cities and towns all have common concerns and opportunities.

Brockton, Taunton, Fall River, and New Bedford are the largest cities in Southeastern Massachusetts and are close to one another in size. All four have a strong Portuguese presence. In 2000, 43.9% of Fall River residents identified as being of Portuguese heritage. This is the highest percentage of Portuguese Americans in the country. Most of the population claims to be of Azorean origin, many from São Miguel Island. There are smaller, but significant presences of other Portuguese-speaking communities, such as other Azorean Islanders, Portuguese from mainland Portugal, Madeirans, Cape Verdeans, Brazilians, and Angolans. In 2000 New Bedford had the second highest percentage of Portuguese Americans with 38.6% of residents reporting that ancestry. New Bedford is also 8.0% Cape Verdean, 4.39% African American and 7.1% Puerto Rican, and 3% were other Hispanics, In 2000 it was 75% White alone.

Like most of the state, Southeastern Massachusetts is ethnically, racially, linguistically, and religiously diverse. However, Portuguese-speakers are especially well represented in this area (especially Bristol County) due to a pattern of immigration that began in the 19th century and was tied to the whaling industry. Today, many people in Southeastern Massachusetts, most notability Bristol County, trace their ancestry to mainland Portugal and the Azores. Irish Americans dominate Bristol County and Plymouth County which has been known as the "Irish Riviera". Cape Verdean Americans, Brazilian Americans, Angolan Americans, African Americans, Arab Americans, Irish Americans, British Americans, Scottish Americans, Portuguese Americans, Asian Americans, Latin Americans, Spanish Americans, Chinese Americans, Japanese Americans, Russian Americans, Turkish Americans, German Americans, Polish Americans, Swedish Americans, French Americans, Lebanese Americans, Italian Americans, and Greek Americans preside over Brockton, Taunton, Fall River and New Bedford.

== Cities and towns ==
| Municipality | Type | County | Form of government | Population (2010) | Year established |
|---|---|---|---|---|---|
| Abington | Town | Plymouth | Open town meeting | 15,985 | 1712 |
| Acushnet | Town | Bristol | Open town meeting | 10,303 | 1860 |
| Aquinnah | Town | Dukes | Open town meeting | 311 | 1870 |
| Attleboro | City | Bristol | Mayor-council | 43,593 | 1694 |
| Avon | Town | Norfolk | Open town meeting | 4,356 | 1888 |
| Barnstable | City | Barnstable | Council-manager | 45,193 | 1639 |
| Bellingham | Town | Norfolk | Open town meeting | 16,332 | 1719 |
| Berkley | Town | Bristol | Open town meeting | 6,411 | 1735 |
| Blackstone | Town | Worcester | Open town meeting | 9,026 | 1845 |
| Bourne | Town | Barnstable | Open town meeting | 19,754 | 1884 |
| Braintree | City | Norfolk | Mayor-council | 35,744 | 1640 |
| Brewster | Town | Barnstable | Open town meeting | 9,820 | 1803 |
| Bridgewater | City | Plymouth | Council-manager | 26,563 | 1656 |
| Brockton | City | Plymouth | Mayor-council | 105,643 | 1821 |
| Canton | Town | Norfolk | Open town meeting | 21,561 | 1797 |
| Carver | Town | Plymouth | Open town meeting | 11,509 | 1790 |
| Chatham | Town | Barnstable | Open town meeting | 6,125 | 1712 |
| Chilmark | Town | Dukes | Open town meeting | 866 | 1714 |
| Cohasset | Town | Norfolk | Open town meeting | 7,542 | 1775 |
| Dartmouth | Town | Bristol | Representative town meeting | 34,032 | 1664 |
| Dedham | Town | Norfolk | Representative town meeting | 24,729 | 1636 |
| Dennis | Town | Barnstable | Open town meeting | 14,207 | 1793 |
| Dighton | Town | Bristol | Open town meeting | 7,086 | 1712 |
| Douglas | Town | Worcester | Open town meeting | 8,471 | 1775 |
| Dover | Town | Norfolk | Open town meeting | 5,589 | 1836 |
| Duxbury | Town | Plymouth | Open town meeting | 15,059 | 1637 |
| East Bridgewater | Town | Plymouth | Open town meeting | 13,794 | 1823 |
| Eastham | Town | Barnstable | Open town meeting | 4,956 | 1646 |
| Easton | Town | Bristol | Open town meeting | 23,112 | 1725 |
| Edgartown | Town | Dukes | Open town meeting | 4,067 | 1671 |
| Fairhaven | Town | Bristol | Representative town meeting | 15,873 | 1812 |
| Fall River | City | Bristol | Mayor-council | 88,857 | 1803 |
| Falmouth | Town | Barnstable | Representative town meeting | 31,531 | 1686 |
| Foxborough | Town | Norfolk | Open town meeting | 16,865 | 1778 |
| Franklin | City | Norfolk | Council-administrator | 31,635 | 1778 |
| Freetown | Town | Bristol | Open town meeting | 8,870 | 1683 |
| Grafton | Town | Worcester | Open town meeting | 17,765 | 1735 |
| Gosnold | Town | Dukes | Open town meeting | 75 | 1864 |
| Halifax | Town | Plymouth | Open town meeting | 7,518 | 1734 |
| Hanover | Town | Plymouth | Open town meeting | 13,879 | 1727 |
| Hanson | Town | Plymouth | Open town meeting | 10,209 | 1820 |
| Harwich | Town | Barnstable | Open town meeting | 12,243 | 1694 |
| Hingham | Town | Plymouth | Open town meeting | 22,157 | 1635 |
| Holbrook | Town | Norfolk | Representative town meeting | 10,791 | 1872 |
| Hopedale | Town | Worcester | Open town meeting | 5,911 | 1886 |
| Hull | Town | Plymouth | Open town meeting | 10,293 | 1644 |
| Kingston | Town | Plymouth | Open town meeting | 12,629 | 1726 |
| Lakeville | Town | Plymouth | Open town meeting | 10,602 | 1853 |
| Mansfield | Town | Bristol | Open town meeting | 23,184 | 1775 |
| Marion | Town | Plymouth | Open town meeting | 4,907 | 1852 |
| Marshfield | Town | Plymouth | Open town meeting | 25,132 | 1640 |
| Mashpee | Town | Barnstable | Open town meeting | 14,006 | 1870 |
| Mattapoisett | Town | Plymouth | Open town meeting | 6,045 | 1857 |
| Medfield | Town | Norfolk | Open town meeting | 12,024 | 1651 |
| Medway | Town | Norfolk | Open town meeting | 12,752 | 1713 |
| Mendon | Town | Worcester | Open town meeting | 5,839 | 1667 |
| Middleborough | Town | Plymouth | Open town meeting | 23,116 | 1669 |
| Milford | Town | Worcester | Representative town meeting | 27,999 | 1780 |
| Millbury | Town | Worcester | Open town meeting | 13,261 | 1813 |
| Millis | Town | Norfolk | Open town meeting | 7,891 | 1885 |
| Millville | Town | Worcester | Open town meeting | 3,190 | 1916 |
| Milton | Town | Norfolk | Representative town meeting | 27,003 | 1662 |
| Nantucket | Town | Nantucket | Open town meeting | 10,172 | 1671 |
| New Bedford | City | Bristol | Mayor-council | 95,072 | 1787 |
| Norfolk | Town | Norfolk | Open town meeting | 11,227 | 1870 |
| North Attleborough | Town | Bristol | Representative town meeting | 28,712 | 1887 |
| Northbridge | Town | Worcester | Open town meeting | 15,707 | 1775 |
| Norton | Town | Bristol | Open town meeting | 19,031 | 1711 |
| Norwell | Town | Plymouth | Open town meeting | 10,506 | 1849 |
| Norwood | Town | Norfolk | Representative town meeting | 28,602 | 1872 |
| Oak Bluffs | Town | Dukes | Open town meeting | 4,527 | 1880 |
| Orleans | Town | Barnstable | Open town meeting | 5,890 | 1797 |
| Pembroke | Town | Plymouth | Open town meeting | 17,837 | 1712 |
| Plainville | Town | Norfolk | Open town meeting | 8,264 | 1905 |
| Plymouth | Town | Plymouth | Representative town meeting | 56,468 | 1620 |
| Plympton | Town | Plymouth | Open town meeting | 2,820 | 1707 |
| Provincetown | Town | Barnstable | Open town meeting | 2,942 | 1727 |
| Quincy | City | Norfolk | Mayor-council | 92,271 | 1792 |
| Randolph | City | Norfolk | Council-manager | 32,112 | 1793 |
| Raynham | Town | Bristol | Open town meeting | 13,383 | 1731 |
| Rehoboth | Town | Bristol | Open town meeting | 11,608 | 1645 |
| Rochester | Town | Plymouth | Open town meeting | 5,232 | 1686 |
| Rockland | Town | Plymouth | Open town meeting | 17,489 | 1874 |
| Sandwich | Town | Barnstable | Open town meeting | 20,675 | 1638 |
| Scituate | Town | Plymouth | Open town meeting | 18,133 | 1636 |
| Seekonk | Town | Bristol | Open town meeting | 13,722 | 1812 |
| Sharon | Town | Norfolk | Open town meeting | 17,612 | 1775 |
| Somerset | Town | Bristol | Open town meeting | 18,165 | 1790 |
| Stoughton | Town | Norfolk | Representative town meeting | 26,962 | 1726 |
| Sutton | Town | Worcester | Open town meeting | 8,963 | 1714 |
| Swansea | Town | Bristol | Open town meeting | 15,865 | 1667 |
| Taunton | City | Bristol | Mayor-council | 55,874 | 1639 |
| Tisbury | Town | Dukes | Open town meeting | 3,949 | 1671 |
| Truro | Town | Barnstable | Open town meeting | 2,003 | 1709 |
| Upton | Town | Worcester | Open town meeting | 7,542 | 1735 |
| Uxbridge | Town | Worcester | Open town meeting | 13,457 | 1727 |
| Walpole | Town | Norfolk | Representative town meeting | 24,070 | 1724 |
| Wareham | Town | Plymouth | Open town meeting | 21,822 | 1739 |
| Wellfleet | Town | Barnstable | Open town meeting | 2,750 | 1775 |
| West Bridgewater | Town | Plymouth | Open town meeting | 6,916 | 1822 |
| West Tisbury | Town | Dukes | Open town meeting | 2,740 | 1892 |
| Westport | Town | Bristol | Open town meeting | 15,532 | 1787 |
| Westwood | Town | Norfolk | Open town meeting | 14,618 | 1897 |
| Weymouth | City | Norfolk | Mayor-council | 53,743 | 1635 |
| Whitman | Town | Plymouth | Open town meeting | 14,489 | 1875 |
| Wrentham | Town | Norfolk | Open town meeting | 10,955 | 1673 |
| Yarmouth | Town | Barnstable | Open town meeting | 23,793 | 1639 |

The following tabular list shows the 12 government divisions of Southeastern Massachusetts which have been officially granted the right to use the city form of government along with the official name in use by each municipality. (Note: The main source for the table is the Massachusetts Municipal Association 2009-2010 Municipal Directory. The MMA Directory is not an official state document, but is more up to date and specific than the official list from the Massachusetts Secretary of the Commonwealth's office, which is dated 03-11-2008 and does not include Palmer, Randolph and Winthrop, which have since adopted the city form of government.)

| Municipality | Official name | Web reference |
|---|---|---|
| Attleboro | City of Attleboro | |
| Barnstable | Town of Barnstable | |
| Braintree | Town of Braintree | |
| Bridgewater | Town of Bridgewater | |
| Brockton | City of Brockton | |
| Fall River | City of Fall River | |
| Franklin | Town of Franklin | |
| New Bedford | City of New Bedford | |
| Quincy | City of Quincy | |
| Randolph | Town of Randolph | |
| Taunton | City of Taunton | |
| Weymouth | Town of Weymouth | |

=== Census-designated places ===
- Acushnet Center
- Bellingham
- Bliss Corner
- Bourne
- Brewster
- Bridgewater
- Buzzards Bay
- Cedar Crest
- Chatham
- Dennis
- Dennis Port
- Dover
- Duxbury
- East Dennis
- East Falmouth
- East Harwich
- East Sandwich
- East Taunton
- Edgartown
- Falmouth
- Forestdale
- Foxborough
- Green Harbor
- Hanson
- Harwich Center
- Harwich Port
- Kingston
- Mansfield Center
- Marion Center
- Marshfield
- Marshfield Hills
- Mashpee Neck
- Mattapoisett Center
- Medfield
- Middleborough Center
- Millis-Clicquot
- Monomoscoy Island
- Monument Beach
- New Seabury
- North Eastham
- North Falmouth
- North Lakeville
- North Pembroke
- North Plymouth
- North Scituate
- North Seekonk
- North Westport
- Northwest Harwich
- Norton Center
- Oak Bluffs
- Ocean Bluff-Brant Rock
- Ocean Grove
- Onset
- Orleans
- The Pinehills
- Plymouth ("Plymouth Center")
- Pocasset
- Popponesset
- Popponesset Island
- Provincetown
- Raynham Center
- Sagamore
- Sandwich
- Scituate
- Seabrook
- Seconsett Island
- Sharon
- Smith Mills
- South Dennis
- South Duxbury
- South Yarmouth
- Southfield, Massachusetts
- Teaticket
- Taunton
- Vineyard Haven
- Walpole
- Wareham Center
- West Chatham
- West Dennis
- West Falmouth
- West Wareham
- West Yarmouth
- Weweantic
- White Island Shores
- Woods Hole
- Yarmouth Port

== Education ==
Institutions of higher learning which serve Southeastern Massachusetts communities include:

- Bradford Durfee College of Technology
- Bridgewater State University
- Bristol Community College
- Cape Cod Community College
- Massachusetts Maritime Academy
- Massasoit Community College
- Stonehill College
- University of Massachusetts Dartmouth
- University of Massachusetts School of Law
- Wheaton College
- Woods Hole Oceanographic Institution
