= List of census-designated places in Massachusetts =

This article lists all 190 census-designated places in the U.S. State of Massachusetts.

== List ==
CDP	Population (2020)	County	City or town
Abington	17,062	Plymouth	Abington (Conterminous)
Acushnet Center	3,030	Bristol	Acushnet
Adams	5,466	Berkshire	Adams
Andover	9,735	Essex	Andover
Arlington	46,308	Middlesex	Arlington (Conterminous)
Athol	8,486	Worcester	Athol
Ayer	2,986	Middlesex	Ayer
Baldwinville	2,117	Worcester	Templeton
Barre	1,029	Worcester	Barre
Belchertown	3,129	Hampshire	Belchertown
Bellingham	4,782	Norfolk	Bellingham
Belmont	27,295	Middlesex	Belmont (Conterminous)
Blandford	363	Hampden	Blandford
Bliss Corner	5,480	Bristol	Dartmouth
Bourne	1,497	Barnstable	Bourne
Boxford	2,432	Essex	Boxford
Brewster	2,028	Barnstable	Brewster
Brookfield	824	Worcester	Brookfield
Brookline	63,191	Norfolk	Brookline (Conterminous)
Burlington	26,377	Middlesex	Burlington (Conterminous)
Buzzards Bay	4,279	Barnstable	Bourne
Cedar Crest	2,230	Plymouth	Marshfield
Chatham	1,551	Barnstable	Chatham
Cheshire	545	Berkshire	Cheshire
Chester	552	Hampden	Chester
Clinton	8,166	Worcester	Clinton
Cochituate	6,927	Middlesex	Wayland
Cordaville	2,703	Worcester	Southborough
Danvers	28,087	Essex	Danvers (Conterminous)
Dedham	25,364	Norfolk	Dedham (Conterminous)
Deerfield	479	Franklin	Deerfield
Dennis	2,399	Barnstable	Dennis
Dennis Port	3,487	Barnstable	Dennis
Devens	1,697	Middlesex & Worcester	Ayer, Harvard & Shirley
Dover	2,452	Norfolk	Dover
Duxbury	1,896	Plymouth	Duxbury
East Brookfield	1,292	Worcester	East Brookfield
East Dennis	2,585	Barnstable	Dennis
East Douglas	2,702	Worcester	Douglas
East Falmouth	6,278	Barnstable	Falmouth
East Harwich	5,250	Barnstable	Harwich
East Pepperell	2,120	Middlesex	Pepperell
East Sandwich	3,669	Barnstable	Sandwich
Edgartown	1,107	Dukes	Edgartown
Essex	1,517	Essex	Essex
Falmouth	3,818	Barnstable	Falmouth
Fiskdale	2,797	Worcester	Sturbridge
Forestdale	4,116	Barnstable	Sandwich
Foxborough	6,356	Norfolk	Foxborough
Granby	1,306	Hampshire	Granby
Great Barrington	2,234	Berkshire	Great Barrington
Green Harbor	394	Plymouth	Duxbury & Marshfield
Groton	1,353	Middlesex	Groton
Hanscom AFB	1,516	Middlesex	Bedford & Lincoln
Hanson	2,028	Plymouth	Hanson
Harwich Center	1,995	Barnstable	Harwich
Harwich Port	1,899	Barnstable	Harwich
Hatfield	1,453	Hampshire	Hatfield
Hingham	5,979	Plymouth	Hingham
Holbrook	11,405	Norfolk	Holbrook (Conterminous)
Holland	1,551	Hampden	Holland
Hopedale	3,939	Worcester	Hopedale
Hopkinton	2,651	Middlesex	Hopkinton
Housatonic	1,083	Berkshire	Great Barrington
Hudson	15,749	Middlesex	Hudson
Hull	10,072	Plymouth	Hull (Conterminous)
Huntington	857	Hampshire	Huntington
Ipswich	4,370	Essex	Ipswich
Kingston	5,700	Plymouth	Kingston
Lee	1,880	Berkshire	Lee
Lenox	1,639	Berkshire	Lenox
Lenox Dale	165	Berkshire	Lenox
Lexington	34,454	Middlesex	Lexington (Conterminous)
Littleton Common	3,065	Middlesex	Littleton
Longmeadow	15,853	Hampden	Longmeadow (Conterminous)
Lunenburg	1,789	Worcester	Lunenburg
Lynnfield	13,000	Essex	Lynnfield (Conterminous)
Madaket	377	Nantucket	Nantucket
Mansfield Center	7,830	Bristol	Mansfield
Marblehead	20,441	Essex	Marblehead (Conterminous)
Marion Center	1,172	Plymouth	Marion
Marshfield	4,653	Plymouth	Marshfield
Marshfield Hills	2,491	Plymouth	Marshfield
Mashpee Neck	1,076	Barnstable	Mashpee
Mattapoisett Center	3,190	Plymouth	Mattapoisett
Maynard	10,746	Middlesex	Maynard (Conterminous)
Medfield	6,939	Norfolk	Medfield
Middleborough Center	7,921	Plymouth	Middleborough
Milford	26,971	Worcester	Milford
Millers Falls	994	Franklin	Erving & Montague
Millis-Clicquot	4,499	Norfolk	Millis
Milton	28,630	Norfolk	Milton (Conterminous)
Monomoscoy Island	139	Barnstable	Mashpee
Monson Center	1,952	Hampden	Monson
Monument Beach	2,784	Barnstable	Bourne
Nahant	3,334	Essex	Nahant (Conterminous)
Nantucket	10,166	Nantucket	Nantucket
Needham	32,091	Norfolk	Needham (Conterminous)
New Seabury	852	Barnstable	Mashpee
Northborough	6,474	Worcester	Northborough
North Brookfield	2,256	Worcester	North Brookfield
North Eastham	2,296	Barnstable	Eastham
North Falmouth	3,293	Barnstable	Falmouth
North Lakeville	3,290	Plymouth	Lakeville
North Pembroke	3,490	Plymouth	Pembroke
North Plymouth	3,983	Plymouth	Plymouth
North Scituate	5,414	Plymouth	Scituate
North Seekonk	2,726	Bristol	Seekonk
North Westport	4,720	Bristol	Westport
Northfield	1,051	Franklin	Northfield
Northwest Harwich	4,296	Barnstable	Harwich
Norton Center	2,677	Bristol	Norton
Norwood	31,611	Norfolk	Norwood (Conterminous)
Oak Bluffs	2,324	Dukes	Oak Bluffs
Ocean Bluff-Brant Rock	4,744	Plymouth	Marshfield
Ocean Grove	2,904	Bristol	Swansea
Onset	1,617	Plymouth	Wareham
Orange	3,636	Franklin	Orange
Orleans	1,767	Barnstable	Orleans
Oxford	5,928	Worcester	Oxford
Pepperell	2,390	Middlesex	Pepperell
Petersham	225	Worcester	Petersham
Pinehurst	7,368	Middlesex	Billerica
Plymouth	7,667	Plymouth	Plymouth
Pocasset	2,843	Barnstable	Bourne
Popponesset	280	Barnstable	Mashpee
Popponesset Island	45	Barnstable	Mashpee
Provincetown	3,318	Barnstable	Provincetown
Raynham Center	4,365	Bristol	Raynham
Reading	25,518	Middlesex	Reading (Conterminous)
Rockport	5,010	Essex	Rockport
Rowley	1,523	Essex	Rowley
Russell	690	Hampden	Russell
Rutland	2,179	Worcester	Rutland
Sagamore	3,851	Barnstable	Bourne
Salisbury	5,629	Essex	Salisbury
Sandwich	2,998	Barnstable	Sandwich
Saugus	28,512	Essex	Saugus (Conterminous)
Scituate	5,620	Plymouth	Scituate
Seabrook	448	Barnstable	Mashpee
Seconsett Island	98	Barnstable	Mashpee
Sharon	6,184	Norfolk	Sharon
Shelburne Falls	1,719	Franklin	Buckland & Shelburne
Shirley	1,611	Middlesex	Shirley
Siasconset	191	Nantucket	Nantucket
Smith Mills	4,832	Bristol	Dartmouth
Somerset	18,303	Bristol	Somerset (Conterminous)
South Ashburnham	1,136	Worcester	Ashburnham
South Deerfield	1,930	Franklin	Deerfield
South Dennis	3,899	Barnstable	Dennis
South Duxbury	3,463	Plymouth	Duxbury
South Lancaster	1,642	Worcester	Lancaster
South Yarmouth	11,703	Barnstable	Yarmouth
Spencer	5,810	Worcester	Spencer
Stoneham	23,244	Middlesex	Stoneham (Conterminous)
Sturbridge	2,385	Worcester	Sturbridge
Swampscott	15,111	Essex	Swampscott (Conterminous)
Teaticket	1,663	Barnstable	Falmouth
The Pinehills	4,515	Plymouth	Plymouth
Topsfield	2,864	Essex	Topsfield
Townsend	1,213	Middlesex	Townsend
Turners Falls	4,512	Franklin	Montague
Upton	3,090	Worcester	Upton
Vineyard Haven	2,747	Dukes	Tisbury
Wakefield	27,090	Middlesex	Wakefield (Conterminous)
Walpole	5,989	Norfolk	Walpole
Ware	6,266	Hampshire	Ware
Wareham Center	2,972	Plymouth	Wareham
Warren	1,333	Worcester	Warren
Webster	12,194	Worcester	Webster
Wellesley	29,550	Norfolk	Wellesley (Conterminous)
Westborough	4,255	Worcester	Westborough
West Brookfield	1,375	Worcester	West Brookfield
West Chatham	1,619	Barnstable	Chatham
West Concord	6,320	Middlesex	Concord
West Dennis	2,304	Barnstable	Dennis
West Falmouth	1,812	Barnstable	Falmouth
West Wareham	2,224	Plymouth	Wareham
West Warren	721	Worcester	Warren
West Yarmouth	6,278	Barnstable	Yarmouth
Weweantic	2,109	Plymouth	Wareham
White Island Shores	2,180	Plymouth	Wareham
Whitinsville	6,750	Worcester	Northbridge
Wilbraham	4,003	Hampden	Wilbraham
Williamstown	4,308	Berkshire	Williamstown
Wilmington	23,349	Middlesex	Wilmington (Conterminous)
Winchendon	4,160	Worcester	Winchendon
Winchester	22,970	Middlesex	Winchester (Conterminous)
Woods Hole	834	Barnstable	Falmouth
Yarmouth Port	5,403	Barnstable	Yarmouth

== See also ==
- List of municipalities in Massachusetts
