= Marion Center =

Marion Center may refer to various communities in the United States:

- Marion Center, Massachusetts
- Marion Center, Pennsylvania
