= Hingham =

Hingham may refer to:

In the United Kingdom

- Hingham, Norfolk

In the United States

- Hingham, Massachusetts, a New England town
  - Hingham (CDP), Massachusetts, the central urban area in the town
- Hingham, Montana, a town
- Hingham, Wisconsin, an unincorporated community
