= Plymouth County, Massachusetts =

County in Massachusetts, United States

- County
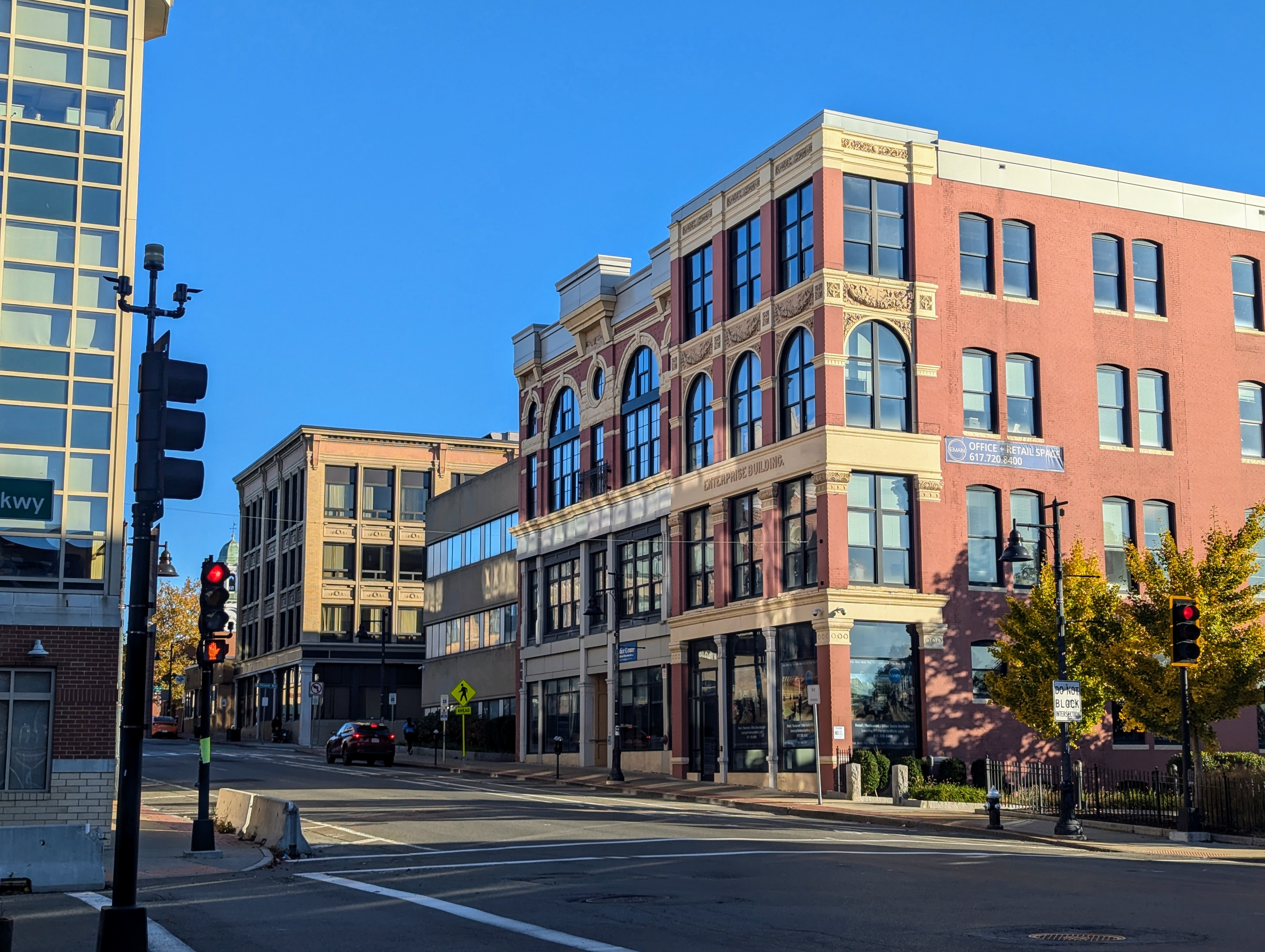
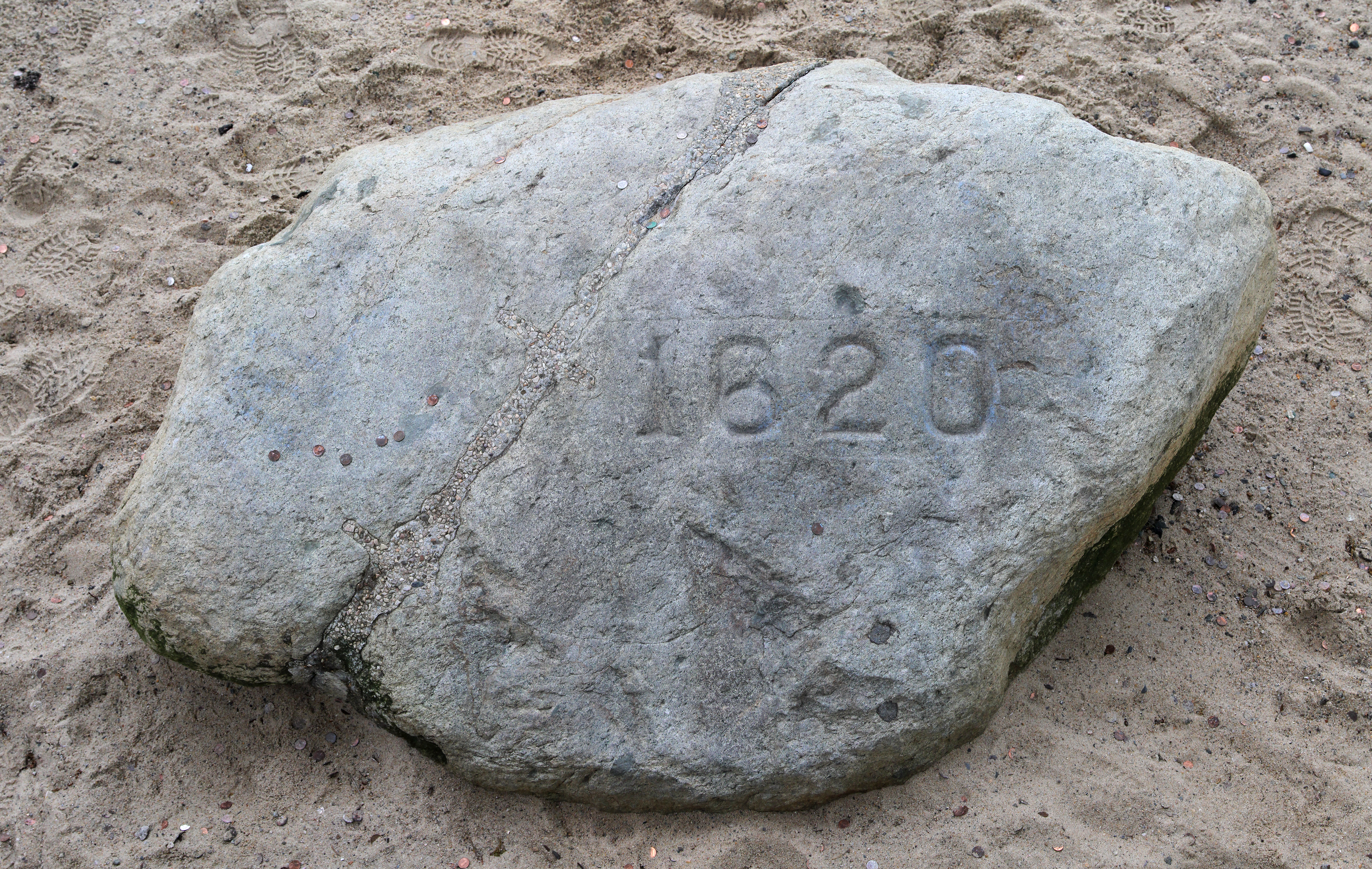
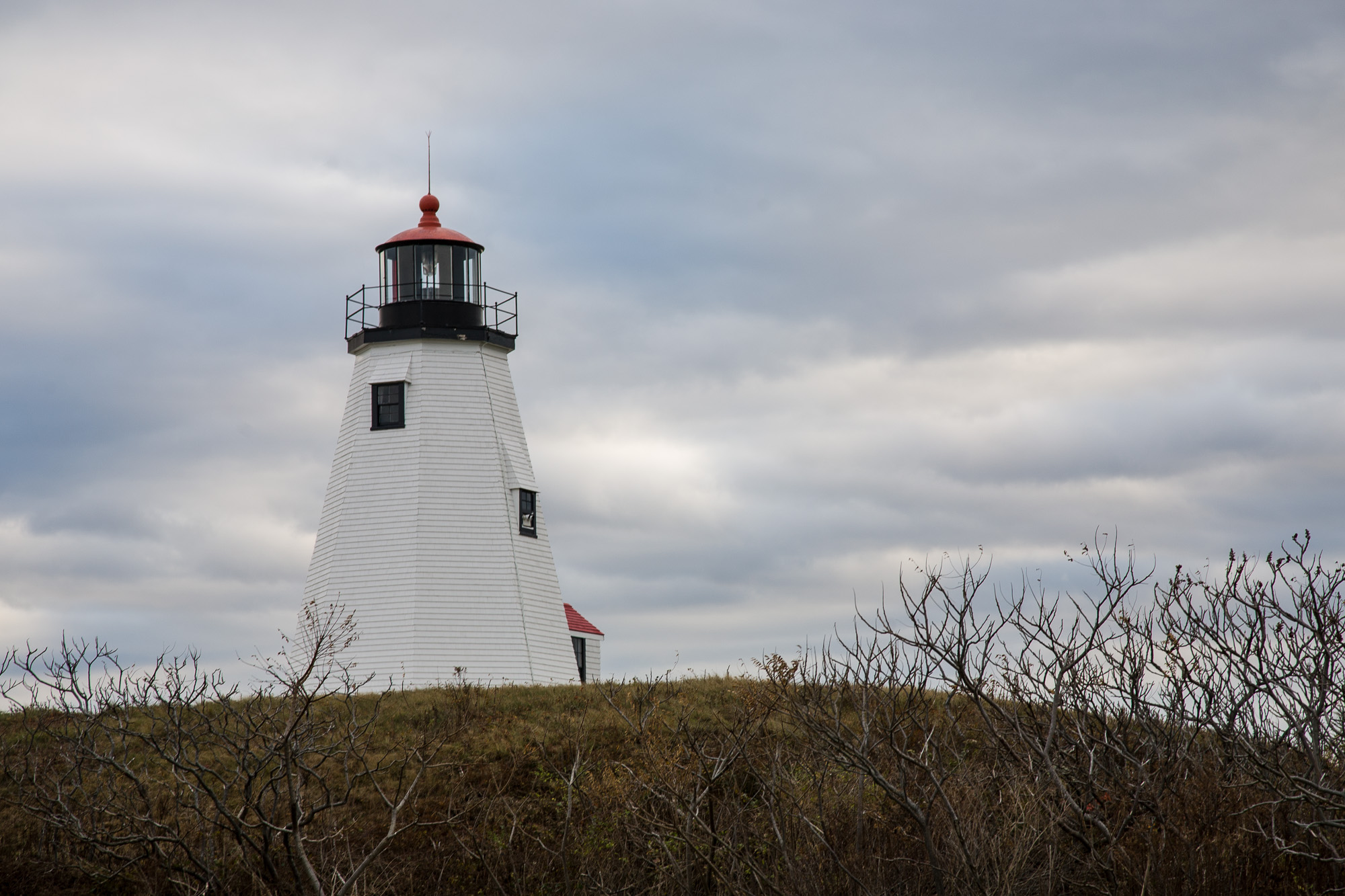
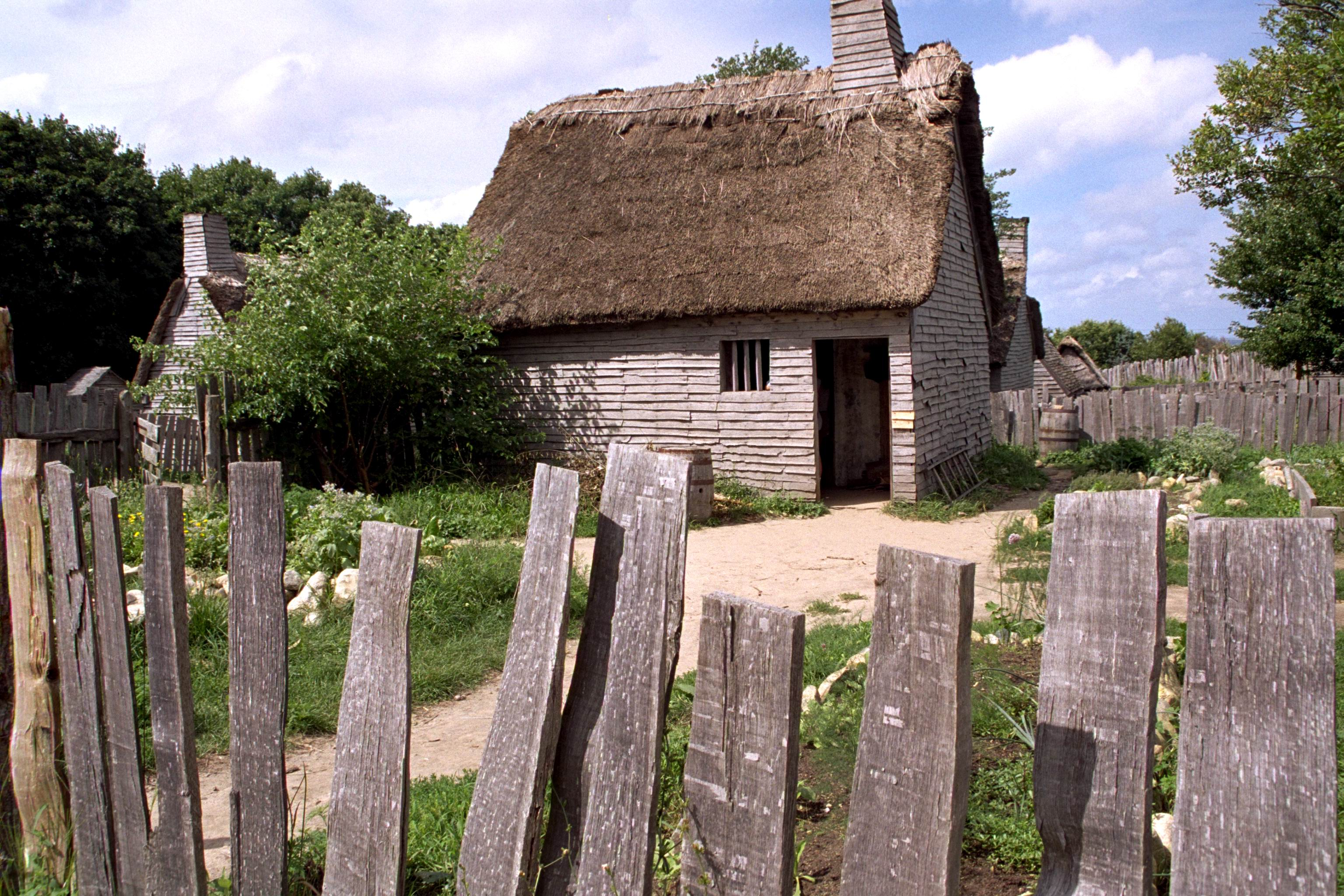
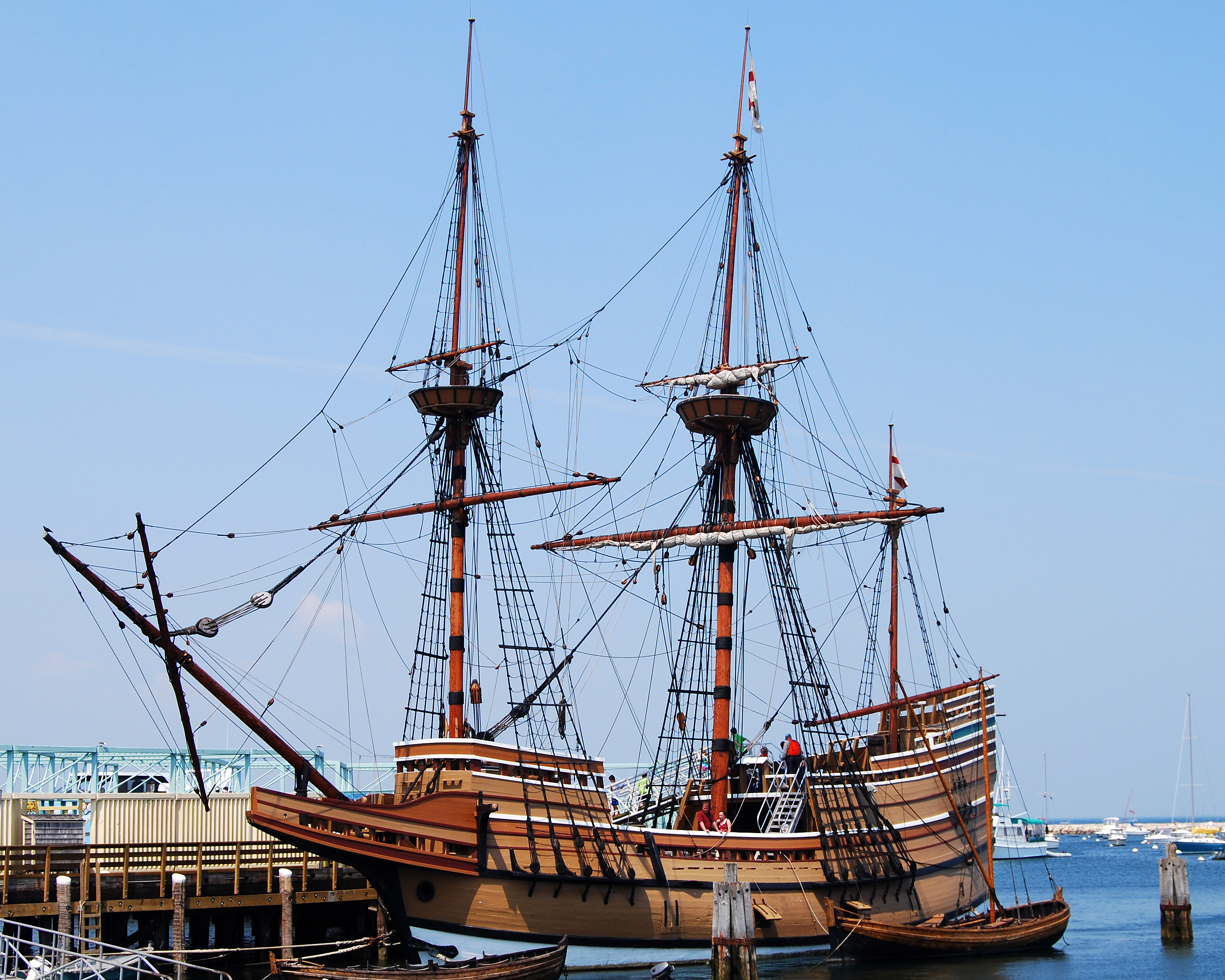
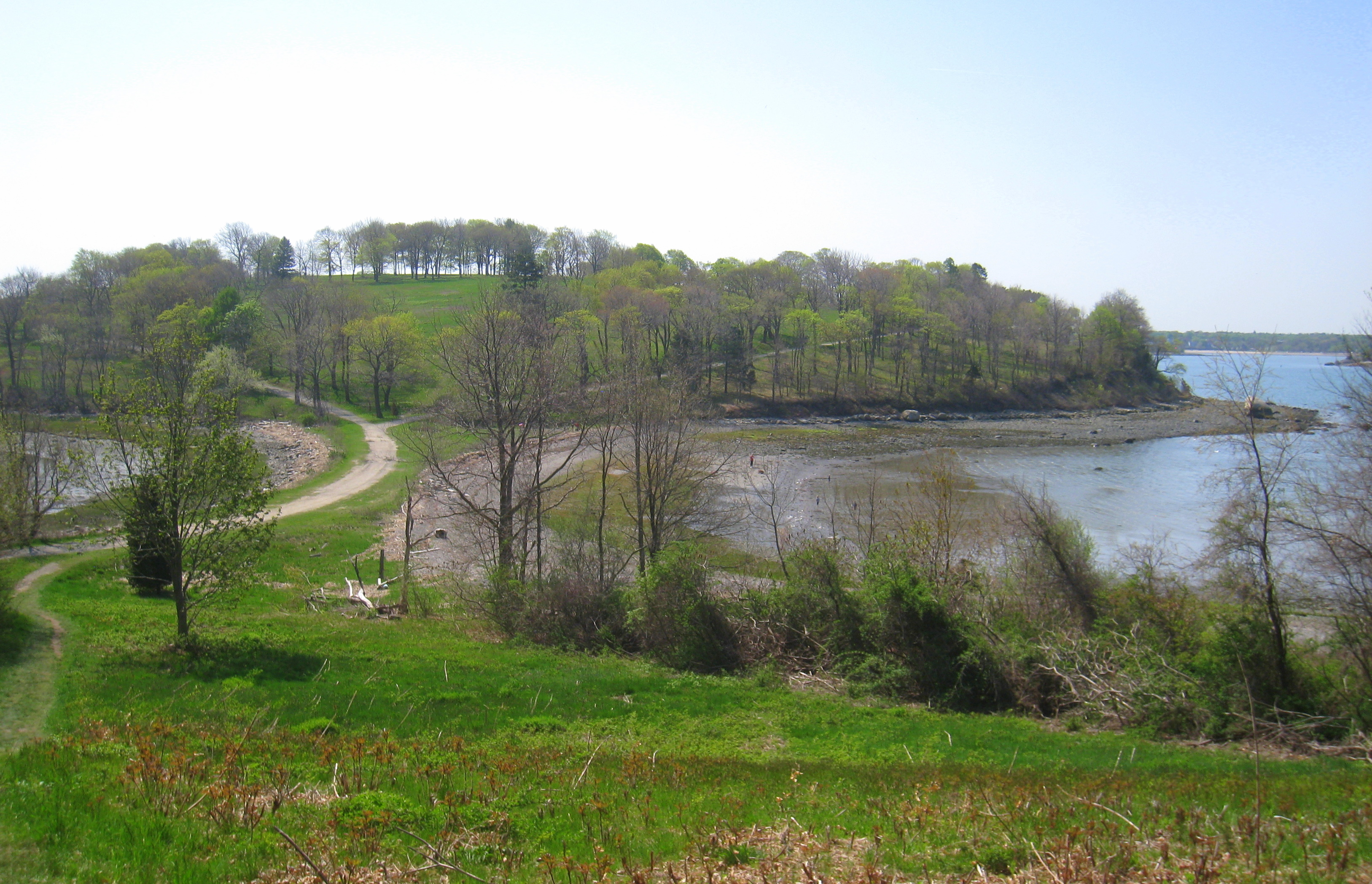
- Brockton Plymouth Rock Plymouth Light Plimoth Patuxet Mayflower II World's End

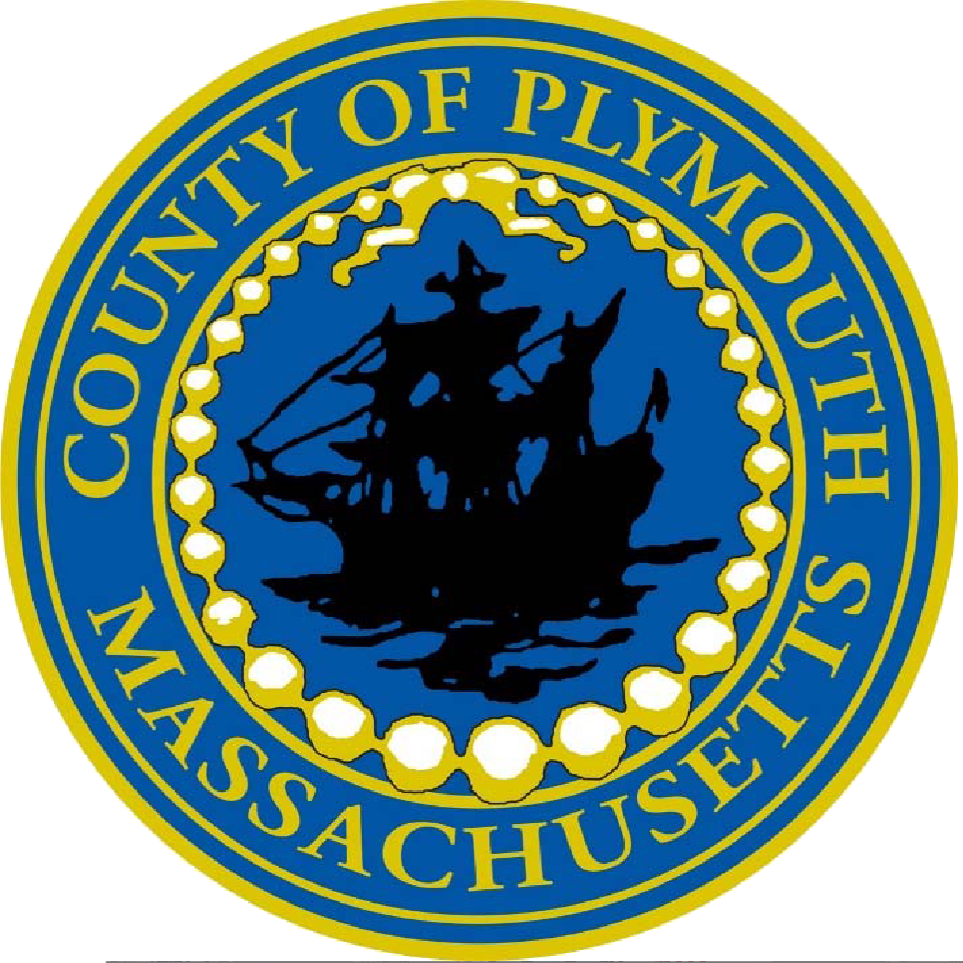
- Seal

- Location within the U.S. state of Massachusetts
- Coordinates: 41°58′44″N 70°49′08″W
- Country: United States
- State: Massachusetts
- Founded: June 2, 1685
- Seat: Plymouth and Brockton
- Largest city: Brockton

Area
  - Total: 1,093 sq mi (2,830 km^{2})
  - Land: 659 sq mi (1,710 km^{2})
  - Water: 434 sq mi (1,120 km^{2}) 40%

Population (2020)
  - Total: 530,819
  - Estimate (2024): 546,829 ▲
  - Density: 806.1/sq mi (311.2/km^{2})
- Time zone: UTC−5 (Eastern)
  - Summer (DST): UTC−4 (EDT)
- Congressional districts: 4th, 8th, 9th
- Website: www.plymouthcountyma.gov

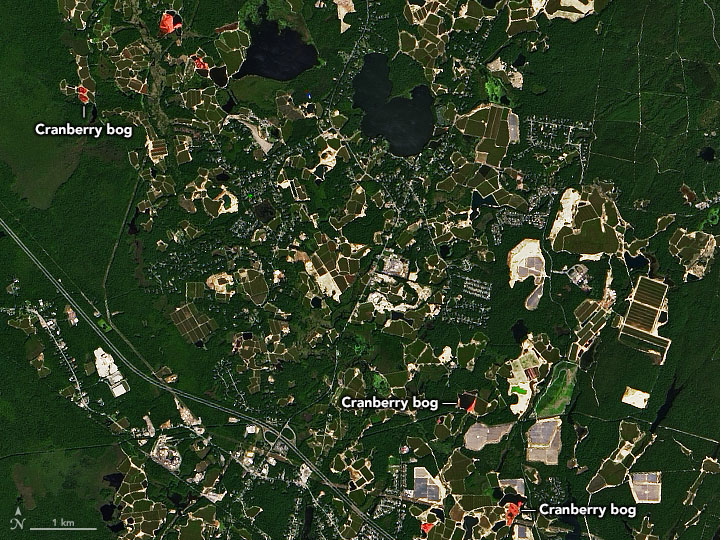
Cranberry Bogs in Plymouth County, September 24, 2022. The cranberries (bright pink in the image) are ready for harvest.

Plymouth County is a county in the U.S. state of Massachusetts, south of Boston. As of the 2020 census, the population was 530,819. Its county seats are Plymouth and Brockton. In 1685, the county was created by the Plymouth General Court, the legislature of Plymouth Colony, predating its annexation by the Massachusetts Bay Colony.

Plymouth County is part of the Boston–Cambridge–Newton, MA–NH Metropolitan Statistical Area.

== Geography ==
According to the U.S. Census Bureau, the county has a total area of 1,093 square miles (2,830 km^{2}), of which 659 square miles (1,710 km^{2}) is land and 434 square miles (1,120 km^{2}) (40%) is water. It is the third-largest county in Massachusetts by total area.

=== Adjacent counties ===
The towns of Hingham and Hull in Plymouth County extend north of Norfolk County and face onto Massachusetts Bay, sharing a northern water boundary with Suffolk County.

- Norfolk County (north)
- Barnstable County (southeast)
- Bristol County (west)

=== National protected area ===
- Boston Harbor Islands National Recreation Area (part)
- Massasoit National Wildlife Refuge

=== Major highways ===
- I-195
- I-495
- US 6
- US 44
- Route 3
  - Route 3A
- Route 14
- Route 18
- Route 24
- Route 25
- Route 27
- Route 28
- Route 36
- Route 37
- Route 53
- Route 58
- Route 79
- Route 80
- Route 104
- Route 105
- Route 106
- Route 123
- Route 139
- Route 140
- Route 228

== Demographics ==
Historical population
Census	Pop.	Note	%±
1790	29,512		—
1800	30,073		1.9%
1810	35,169		16.9%
1820	38,136		8.4%
1830	43,044		12.9%
1840	47,373		10.1%
1850	55,697		17.6%
1860	64,768		16.3%
1870	65,365		0.9%
1880	74,018		13.2%
1890	92,700		25.2%
1900	113,985		23.0%
1910	144,337		26.6%
1920	156,968		8.8%
1930	162,311		3.4%
1940	168,824		4.0%
1950	189,468		12.2%
1960	248,449		31.1%
1970	333,314		34.2%
1980	405,437		21.6%
1990	435,276		7.4%
2000	472,822		8.6%
2010	494,919		4.7%
2020	530,819		7.3%
2025 (est.)	546,829	▲	3.0%
U.S. Decennial Census; 1790–1960 1900–1990; 1990–2000 2010–2020

=== 2020 census ===
As of the 2020 census, the county had a population of 530,819. Of the residents, 21.0% were under the age of 18 and 19.4% were 65 years of age or older; the median age was 43.5 years. For every 100 females there were 94.1 males, and for every 100 females age 18 and over there were 91.2 males. 87.5% of residents lived in urban areas and 12.5% lived in rural areas.

The racial makeup of the county was 77.5% White, 8.5% Black or African American, 0.2% American Indian and Alaska Native, 1.5% Asian, 0.0% Native Hawaiian and Pacific Islander, 3.8% from some other race, and 8.5% from two or more races. Hispanic or Latino residents of any race comprised 4.5% of the population.

There were 197,288 households in the county, of which 30.9% had children under the age of 18 living with them and 26.9% had a female householder with no spouse or partner present. About 24.6% of all households were made up of individuals and 12.4% had someone living alone who was 65 years of age or older.

There were 214,770 housing units, of which 8.1% were vacant. Among occupied housing units, 75.4% were owner-occupied and 24.6% were renter-occupied. The homeowner vacancy rate was 0.9% and the rental vacancy rate was 5.2%.

=== Racial and ethnic composition ===
Plymouth County, Massachusetts – Racial and ethnic composition Note: the US Census treats Hispanic/Latino as an ethnic category. This table excludes Latinos from the racial categories and assigns them to a separate category. Hispanics/Latinos may be of any race.
Race / Ethnicity (NH = Non-Hispanic)	Pop 1980	Pop 1990	Pop 2000	Pop 2010	Pop 2020	% 1980	% 1990	% 2000	% 2010	% 2020
White alone (NH)	386,660	401,847	414,110	415,341	406,919	95.37%	92.32%	87.58%	83.92%	76.66%
Black or African American alone (NH)	7,817	15,003	20,449	33,991	43,482	1.93%	3.45%	4.32%	6.87%	8.19%
Native American or Alaska Native alone (NH)	678	805	889	1,024	796	0.17%	0.18%	0.19%	0.21%	0.15%
Asian alone (NH)	1,425	3,376	4,306	5,928	7,693	0.35%	0.78%	0.91%	1.20%	1.45%
Native Hawaiian or Pacific Islander alone (NH)	x	x	95	118	94	x	x	0.02%	0.02%	0.02%
Other race alone (NH)	4,428	4,674	10,625	11,647	11,966	1.09%	1.07%	2.25%	2.35%	2.25%
Mixed race or Multiracial (NH)	x	x	10,811	11,251	35,917	x	x	2.29%	2.27%	6.77%
Hispanic or Latino (any race)	4,429	9,571	11,537	15,619	23,952	1.09%	2.20%	2.44%	3.16%	4.51%
Total	405,437	435,276	472,822	494,919	530,819	100.00%	100.00%	100.00%	100.00%	100.00%

=== American Community Survey 2025 data ===
The United States Census Bureau estimated that in 2025, Plymouth County’s population was 546.829. It was also estimated that the county's population was 76,91% Non-Hispanic White, 5,60% Hispanic or Latino, 12,72% Non-Hispanic Black, 1,87% Asian, 0,18% Native American, 0,04% Pacific Islander, and 2,67% Multiracial.

Total	Population	Percentage
Non-Hispanic White	420.547	76,91%
Hispanic or Latino	30.633	5,60%
Non-Hispanic Black	69.566	12,72%
Asian	10.241	1,87%
Native American	991	0,18%
Pacific Islander	237	0,04%
Non-Hispanic Multiracial	14.614	2,67%

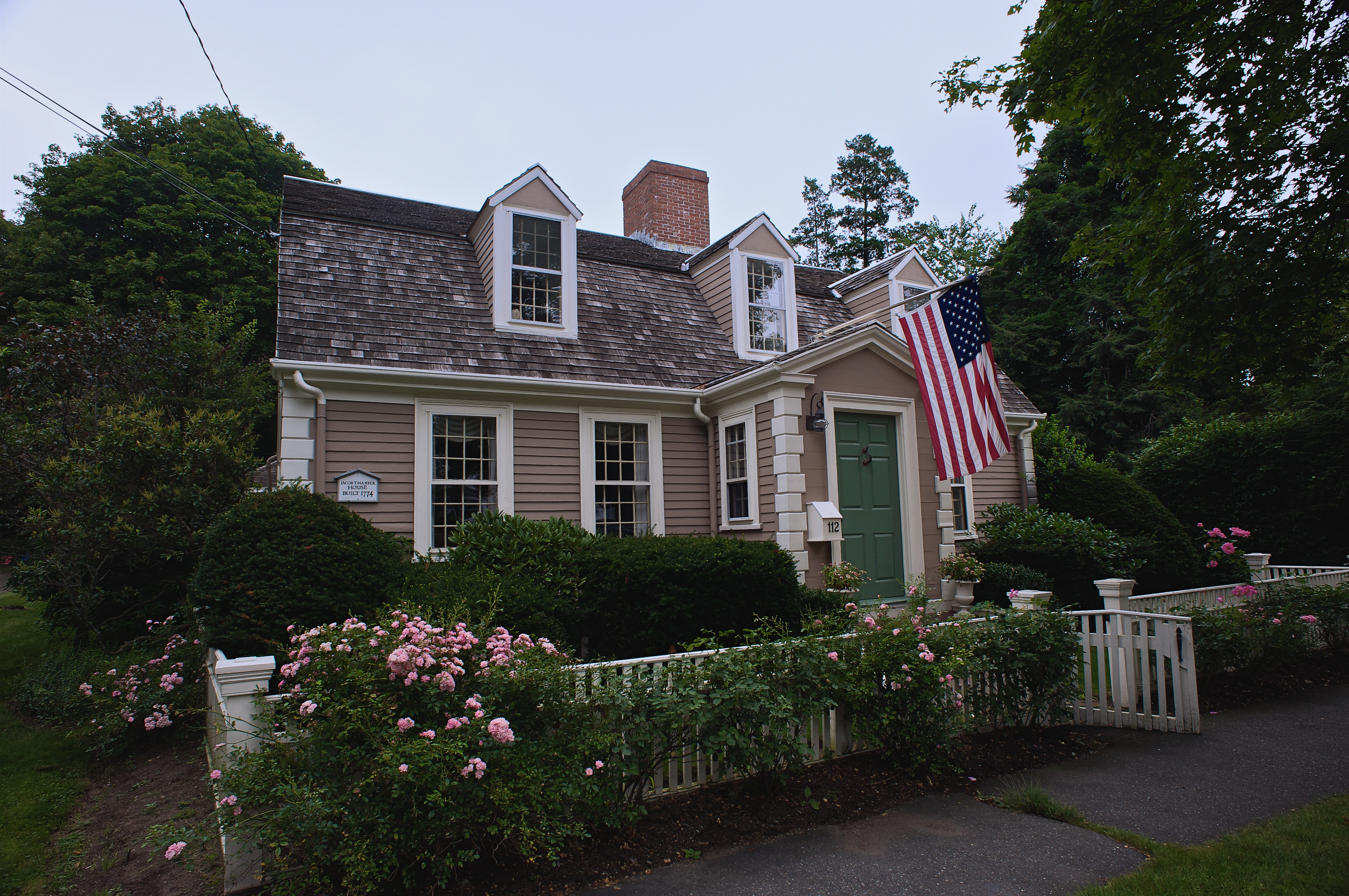
Jacob Thaxter House in Hingham

=== 2010 census ===
At the 2010 census, there were 494,919 people, 181,126 households, and 127,925 families in the county. The population density was 750.9 inhabitants per square mile (289.9/km^{2}). There were 200,161 housing units at an average density of 303.7 per square mile (117.3/km^{2}). The racial makeup of the county was 85.5% white, 7.2% black or African American, 1.2% Asian, 0.2% American Indian, 3.2% from other races, and 2.6% from two or more races. Those of Hispanic or Latino origin made up 3.2% of the population. In terms of ancestry, 33.7% were Irish, 15.8% were Italian, 15.3% were English, 7.3% were German, and 3.7% were American.

Of the 181,126 households, 35.1% had children under the age of 18 living with them, 53.6% were married couples living together, 12.6% had a female householder with no husband present, 29.4% were non-families, and 23.8% of households were made up of individuals. The average household size was 2.67 and the average family size was 3.18. The median age was 41.1 years.

The median household income was $73,131 and the median family income was $86,251. Males had a median income of $60,303 versus $43,837 for females. The per capita income for the county was $33,333. About 5.0% of families and 7.0% of the population were below the poverty line, including 8.3% of those under age 18 and 7.0% of those age 65 or over.

=== 2000 census ===
At the 2000 census there were 472,972 people, 168,361 households, and 122,398 families in the county. The population density was 716 inhabitants per square mile (276/km^{2}). There were 181,524 housing units at an average density of 275 per square mile (106/km^{2}). The racial makeup of the county was 88.70% White, 4.56% Black or African American, 0.21% Native American, 0.92% Asian, 0.02% Pacific Islander, 3.06% from other races, and 2.52% from two or more races. 2.44%. were Hispanic or Latino of any race. 28.0% were of Irish, 12.8% Italian, 10.6% English and 5.1% American ancestry, 90.1% spoke English, 2.5% Spanish, 2.3% Portuguese, 1.5% French Creole and 1.0% French as their first language.

Of the 168,361 households 36.30% had children under the age of 18 living with them, 57.00% were married couples living together, 11.90% had a female householder with no husband present, and 27.30% were non-families. 22.20% of households were one person and 9.00% were one person aged 65 or older. The average household size was 2.74 and the average family size was 3.23.

The age distribution was 26.80% under the age of 18, 7.20% from 18 to 24, 30.40% from 25 to 44, 23.90% from 45 to 64, and 11.80% 65 or older. The median age was 37 years. For every 100 females, there were 95.00 males. For every 100 females age 18 and over, there were 91.30 males.

The median household income was $55,615 and the median family income was $65,554 (these figures had risen to $70,335 and $82,560 respectively as of a 2007 estimate). Males had a median income of $45,535 versus $31,389 for females. The per capita income for the county was $24,789. About 4.90% of families and 6.60% of the population were below the poverty line, including 8.30% of those under age 18 and 7.90% of those age 65 or over.

The leading ancestry group in Plymouth County is Irish, with 31%. Plymouth County, along with Norfolk County, Massachusetts, claims the highest percentage of people with Irish ancestry in the United States.

=== Demographic breakdown by town ===
==== Income ====
The ranking of unincorporated communities that are included on the list are reflective if the census designated locations and villages were included as cities or towns. Data is from the 2007–2011 American Community Survey 5-Year Estimates.

Rank	Town		Per capita income	Median household income	Median family income	Population	Number of households
	Duxbury	CDP	$80,077	$113,672	$218,542	1,459	555
	South Duxbury	CDP	$68,911	$139,712	$169,671	3,435	1,260
	Hingham	CDP	$61,486	$104,926	$134,637	5,856	2,117
	The Pinehills	CDP	$58,507	$91,875	$115,819	922	488
1	Hingham	Town	$56,671	$99,318	$132,744	21,916	8,046
2	Duxbury	Town	$55,510	$122,396	$139,873	14,978	5,256
3	Norwell	Town	$48,440	$109,167	$118,679	10,430	3,468
	Green Harbor	CDP	$47,993	$128,828	$134,157	2,245	876
	Marshfield Hills	CDP	$47,593	$102,344	$135,396	2,485	916
4	Scituate	Town	$47,122	$89,485	$111,893	18,115	6,957
	Marion Center	CDP	$45,404	$83,413	$97,102	1,081	435
5	Marion	Town	$43,383	$87,793	$90,536	4,926	1,873
6	Hull	Town	$43,290	$72,036	$95,964	10,391	4,672
	North Scituate	CDP	$43,214	$84,712	$107,606	5,394	1,955
	Ocean Bluff-Brant Rock	CDP	$42,296	$77,245	$89,940	4,705	1,920
7	Marshfield	Town	$42,269	$93,743	$110,756	25,059	9,322
	Scituate	CDP	$40,337	$69,388	$107,647	5,201	2,169
8	Hanover	Town	$39,631	$100,982	$114,484	13,813	4,729
	North Lakeville	CDP	$39,363	$67,361	$103,456	2,174	840
9	Mattapoisett	Town	$39,312	$82,065	$95,568	6,073	2,436
10	Kingston	Town	$37,783	$77,288	$86,489	12,556	4,624
11	Plympton	Town	$37,755	$93,882	$102,773	2,799	991
	Kingston	CDP	$36,335	$67,292	$75,671	5,695	2,250
	Marshfield	CDP	$36,112	$71,938	$100,855	4,501	1,838
12	Pembroke	Town	$35,228	$82,064	$98,156	17,740	6,291
	Massachusetts	State	$35,051	$65,981	$83,371	6,512,227	2,522,409
13	Lakeville	Town	$35,010	$93,260	$104,416	10,533	3,586
	Plymouth Center	CDP	$34,997	$51,463	$80,924	6,900	3,177
14	Rochester	Town	$34,994	$98,728	$104,496	5,159	1,699
15	Halifax	Town	$34,880	$83,522	$89,456	7,516	2,798
	Mattapoisett Center	CDP	$34,877	$65,034	$85,758	2,898	1,223
	Plymouth County	County	$34,285	$74,698	$88,110	492,934	178,996
16	Plymouth	Town	$33,891	$76,631	$90,764	56,011	20,946
17	West Bridgewater	Town	$33,590	$80,729	$95,182	6,896	2,432
18	Abington	Town	$33,386	$81,677	$92,839	15,841	5,962
19	Hanson	Town	$32,864	$89,000	$96,705	10,148	3,436
	North Pembroke	CDP	$32,239	$74,866	$80,776	3,090	1,180
20	East Bridgewater	Town	$31,802	$79,676	$98,113	13,704	4,682
21	Whitman	Town	$31,378	$74,610	$87,713	14,430	5,192
22	Middleborough	Town	$31,179	$73,490	$85,769	22,807	8,059
	West Wareham	CDP	$31,166	$43,029	$63,452	2,178	963
	Hanson	CDP	$30,630	$88,750	$95,085	1,932	666
23	Rockland	Town	$30,325	$63,896	$74,203	17,515	6,912
24	Bridgewater	Town	$29,460	$88,697	$101,641	26,508	7,927
25	Carver	Town	$29,176	$70,608	$85,996	11,481	4,286
26	Wareham	Town	$28,066	$52,556	$64,891	21,673	9,176
	United States	Country	$27,915	$52,762	$64,293	306,603,772	114,761,359
	Weweantic	CDP	$27,543	$45,833	$51,563	2,008	870
	North Plymouth	CDP	$27,533	$54,000	$77,952	3,740	1,452
	Onset	CDP	$27,391	$41,458	$44,507	1,026	605
	Wareham Center	CDP	$27,391	$45,392	$54,357	3,122	1,533
	Middleborough Center	CDP	$26,763	$59,112	$76,111	6,593	2,407
	White Island Shores	CDP	$25,656	$88,519	$91,250	2,186	680
	Bridgewater	CDP	$22,994	$60,744	$79,621	7,724	2,359
27	Brockton	City	$22,312	$49,848	$57,228	93,916	33,238

== Government and politics ==
=== Elected Officials ===
Plymouth County is governed by three County Commissioners:

Chairman Jared L. Valanzola (R-Plymouth), Commissioner Sandra M. Wright (R-Bridgewater), and Commissioner Gregory M. Hanley (D-Abington)

Other county elected officials include Sheriff Joseph D. McDonald Jr. (R-Kingston), District Attorney Timothy Cruz (R-Marshfield), Treasurer Thomas J. O'Brien (D-Plymouth), Register of Deeds John R. Buckley Jr. (D-Scituate), Register of Probate Matthew McDonough (D-Marshfield), and Clerk of Courts Robert Creedon (D-Brockton)

=== Presidential election results ===
From the late 19th to the mid 20th centuries, Plymouth County was a Republican Party stronghold in presidential elections. From 1876 to 1988, only three Democrats carried the county: Lyndon Johnson, Hubert Humphrey, and Jimmy Carter. Since 1992, however, it has become solidly Democratic, though less so relative to other counties in the state. In 2012, Mitt Romney lost the county by 4.2 points, the closest a Republican had come to winning a county in Massachusetts since 1988. However, it has become more Democratic afterwards, and in 2020, Joe Biden carried the county by 17 points, the largest margin of victory for a Democrat since 1996, only for Kamala Harris to carry it by only 9% four years later. At the state level, Plymouth County is more of a swing county and frequently splits its tickets in local and state elections.

United States presidential election results for Plymouth County, Massachusetts
Year	Republican		Democratic		Third party(ies)	
Year	No.	%	No.	%	No.	%
1804	2,034	63.15%	1,187	36.85%	0	0.00%
1812	2,912	64.34%	1,614	35.66%	0	0.00%
1820	7,610	75.18%	2,512	24.82%	0	0.00%
1824	2,169	87.64%	306	12.36%	0	0.00%
1828	1,642	92.04%	142	7.96%	0	0.00%
1832	1,857	45.74%	797	19.63%	1,406	34.63%
1836	2,843	51.59%	2,668	48.41%	0	0.00%
1840	5,065	58.04%	3,548	40.66%	114	1.31%
1844	4,449	51.92%	3,315	38.69%	805	9.39%
1848	3,569	41.48%	1,848	21.48%	3,188	37.05%
1852	2,993	39.62%	2,082	27.56%	2,480	32.83%
1856	7,228	68.86%	1,772	16.88%	1,496	14.25%
1860	6,703	65.17%	1,423	13.83%	2,160	21.00%
1864	7,610	75.18%	2,512	24.82%	0	0.00%
1868	7,909	74.54%	2,701	25.46%	0	0.00%
1872	7,012	77.70%	2,013	22.30%	0	0.00%
1876	8,310	64.68%	4,518	35.17%	19	0.15%
1880	8,942	64.07%	4,659	33.38%	355	2.54%
1884	7,653	52.71%	4,455	30.69%	2,410	16.60%
1888	9,366	58.28%	6,086	37.87%	618	3.85%
1892	10,501	56.97%	7,296	39.58%	637	3.46%
1896	13,405	76.53%	3,396	19.39%	716	4.09%
1900	10,813	60.68%	4,665	26.18%	2,343	13.15%
1904	12,671	60.89%	5,746	27.61%	2,392	11.50%
1908	13,236	62.42%	5,295	24.97%	2,674	12.61%
1912	5,590	23.63%	6,991	29.56%	11,072	46.81%
1916	13,515	52.48%	11,009	42.75%	1,228	4.77%
1920	33,582	73.54%	9,373	20.53%	2,708	5.93%
1924	34,728	68.97%	8,863	17.60%	6,764	13.43%
1928	41,362	61.95%	24,887	37.27%	517	0.77%
1932	37,729	57.39%	26,137	39.76%	1,878	2.86%
1936	41,942	53.76%	30,466	39.05%	5,602	7.18%
1940	48,617	58.15%	34,481	41.24%	508	0.61%
1944	47,245	59.27%	32,290	40.51%	174	0.22%
1948	48,925	57.46%	34,765	40.83%	1,456	1.71%
1952	67,922	67.22%	32,815	32.48%	305	0.30%
1956	75,575	71.19%	30,377	28.61%	209	0.20%
1960	60,977	51.52%	57,175	48.31%	197	0.17%
1964	37,941	31.53%	82,007	68.15%	387	0.32%
1968	54,644	42.70%	67,771	52.96%	5,562	4.35%
1972	76,062	52.07%	69,124	47.32%	878	0.60%
1976	74,684	45.42%	83,663	50.88%	6,086	3.70%
1980	85,593	49.40%	58,772	33.92%	28,883	16.67%
1984	105,230	60.21%	68,923	39.44%	618	0.35%
1988	105,684	54.62%	84,587	43.72%	3,209	1.66%
1992	69,514	33.47%	79,160	38.11%	59,036	28.42%
1996	64,626	33.31%	106,072	54.67%	23,313	12.02%
2000	82,751	39.11%	115,376	54.53%	13,450	6.36%
2004	105,603	45.27%	125,178	53.66%	2,516	1.08%
2008	112,904	45.19%	131,817	52.77%	5,096	2.04%
2012	121,086	47.20%	131,845	51.40%	3,600	1.40%
2016	115,369	42.54%	135,513	49.97%	20,295	7.48%
2020	121,227	40.17%	173,630	57.53%	6,959	2.31%
2024	133,544	44.50%	159,962	53.30%	6,623	2.21%

=== County seal ===
The seal was adopted by the Plymouth County Commissioners on March 31, 1931, under the authority of the General Laws, Chapter 34, Section 14, and was designed by Frederic T. Bailey of North Scituate who was, at that time and for many years, chairman of the county commissioners.

Voter registration and party enrollment as of October 17, 2018
Party	Number of voters	Percentage
Democratic	93,571	25.91%
Republican	46,856	12.97%
Unenrolled	215,247	59.59%
Minor Parties	1,322	0.37%
Total	361,186	100%

== Media ==
For television, the city is served by the Boston and Providence media markets; no television stations are located within the county.

Radio stations located in Plymouth County include:

Call sign	Frequency	City of license	Licensee	Format	Notes
WATD-FM	95.9 FM	Marshfield	Marshfield Broadcasting Co., Inc.	Adult contemporary	
WBMS	1460 AM	Brockton	Marshfield Broadcasting Co., Inc.	Adult contemporary	
WBIM-FM	91.5 FM	Bridgewater	Bridgewater State University	College radio, alternative	
WPLM	1390 AM	Plymouth	Plymouth Rock Broadcasting Co., Inc.	Various	Currently silent since February 15, 2024
WPLM-FM	99.1 FM	Plymouth	Plymouth Rock Broadcasting Co., Inc.	Adult contemporary	
WRPS	88.3 FM	Rockland	Rockland Public Schools	High school radio	
WSMA	90.5 FM	Scituate	Calvary Chapel of Twin Falls, Inc.	Religious	
WVBF	1530 AM	Middleborough Center	Steven J. Callahan	Talking Information Center	
WWTA	88.5 FM	Marion	Tabor Academy	High school radio	Defunct since April 1, 2014
WZRM	97.7 FM	Brockton	iHM Licenses, LLC	Spanish CHR	

The first radio broadcast in history was made in 1906, from the Brant Rock neighborhood in the town of Marshfield.

The Brockton Enterprise is the only daily newspaper published in the county, although the Quincy Patriot Ledger has extensive coverage of the South Shore of Massachusetts generally and Plymouth County in particular.

There are numerous weekly newspapers published in the county, including:

- Abington Mariner – Abington
- Duxbury Clipper – Duxbury
- The Hingham Journal – Hingham
- Marshfield Mariner - – Marshfield
- Old Colony Memorial – Plymouth
- Plympton-Halifax-Kingston Express – Plympton, Halifax, and Kingston.
- Rockland Standard – Rockland
- Scituate Mariner – Scituate
- The Sentinel – Marion and Rochester

Many were operated by the Memorial Press Group, based in Plymouth, until the chain was sold to GateHouse Media in 2006. The flagship of the group was the Old Colony Memorial, the oldest continually published weekly newspaper in New England, first published in 1822.

== Communities ==
=== Cities ===
- Bridgewater
- Brockton (traditional county seat)

=== Towns ===
- Abington
- Carver
- Duxbury
- East Bridgewater
- Halifax
- Hanover
- Hanson
- Hingham
- Hull
- Kingston
- Lakeville
- Marion
- Marshfield
- Mattapoisett
- Middleborough
- Norwell
- Pembroke
- Plymouth (traditional county seat) (note that Plymouth has surpassed the population of most cities in Massachusetts but continues to use a town-meeting form of government and is still recognized as a town.)
- Plympton
- Rochester
- Rockland
- Scituate
- Wareham
- West Bridgewater
- Whitman

=== Census-designated places ===
- Bridgewater
- Cedar Crest
- Duxbury
- Green Harbor
- Hanson
- Hingham
- Kingston
- Marion Center
- Marshfield
- Marshfield Hills
- Mattapoisett Center
- Middleborough Center
- North Lakeville
- North Pembroke
- North Plymouth
- North Scituate
- Ocean Bluff-Brant Rock
- Onset
- The Pinehills
- Plymouth ("Plymouth Center")
- Scituate
- South Duxbury
- Wareham Center
- West Wareham
- Weweantic
- White Island Shores

=== Other villages ===
- Cedarville
- Chiltonville
- Ellisville
- Elmwood
- Greenbush
- Manomet
- Micajah Heights
- Monponsett
- Plymouth Beach
- Priscilla Beach
- Saquish
- South Carver
- South Middleborough
- South Plymouth
- South Pond
- Vallerville
- Wellingsley
- West Plymouth
- West Wind Shores
- White Horse Beach

== See also ==
- List of Massachusetts locations by per capita income
- Registry of Deeds (Massachusetts)
- National Register of Historic Places listings in Plymouth County, Massachusetts
