= North Lakeville, Massachusetts =

- Census-designated place
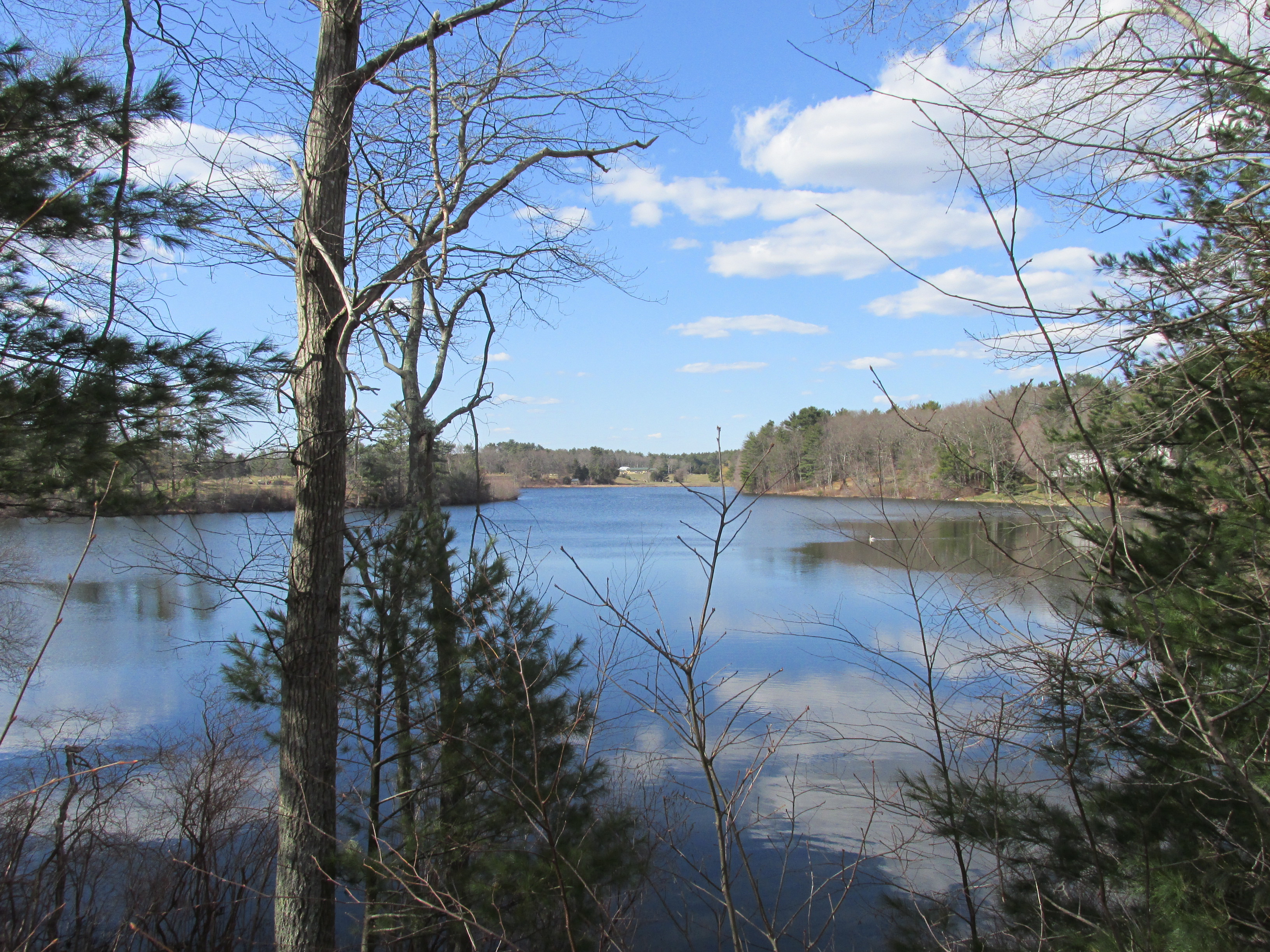
- The Reservoir

- Location in Plymouth County in Massachusetts
- Coordinates: 41°51′55″N 70°56′42″W
- Country: United States
- State: Massachusetts
- County: Plymouth

Area
  - Total: 5.17 sq mi (13.40 km^{2})
  - Land: 5.05 sq mi (13.07 km^{2})
  - Water: 0.13 sq mi (0.34 km^{2})
- Elevation: 79 ft (24 m)

Population (2020)
  - Total: 3,290
  - Density: 652.1/sq mi (251.78/km^{2})
- Time zone: UTC-5 (Eastern (EST))
  - Summer (DST): UTC-4 (EDT)
- ZIP Code: 02347 (Lakeville)
- FIPS code: 25-48220
- GNIS feature ID: 1867308

North Lakeville is a census-designated place (CDP) in the town of Lakeville in Plymouth County, Massachusetts, United States. As of the 2020 census, North Lakeville had a population of 3,290.

It is roughly bounded by the Middleboro-Lakeville town line to the east, Assawompset Pond to the south, Precinct Street to the southwest, and Rhode Island Road (Route 79) to the north/northwest.

== Geography ==
North Lakeville is located at 41°51′55″N 70°56′42″W (41.865338, -70.944901).

According to the United States Census Bureau, the CDP has a total area of 13.4 km^{2} (5.2 mi^{2}), of which 13.3 km^{2} (5.1 mi^{2}) is land and 0.2 km^{2} (0.1 mi^{2}) (1.16%) is water.

== Demographics ==
Historical population
Census	Pop.	Note	%±
2020	3,290		—
U.S. Decennial Census

=== 2020 census ===
As of the 2020 census, North Lakeville had a population of 3,290. The median age was 45.3 years. 20.3% of residents were under the age of 18 and 22.0% of residents were 65 years of age or older. For every 100 females there were 86.5 males, and for every 100 females age 18 and over there were 85.5 males age 18 and over.

75.1% of residents lived in urban areas, while 24.9% lived in rural areas.

There were 1,346 households in North Lakeville, of which 28.2% had children under the age of 18 living in them. Of all households, 49.6% were married-couple households, 14.1% were households with a male householder and no spouse or partner present, and 30.4% were households with a female householder and no spouse or partner present. About 25.3% of all households were made up of individuals and 14.0% had someone living alone who was 65 years of age or older.

There were 1,423 housing units, of which 5.4% were vacant. The homeowner vacancy rate was 1.5% and the rental vacancy rate was 0.0%.

Racial composition as of the 2020 census
Race	Number	Percent
White	2,905	88.3%
Black or African American	70	2.1%
American Indian and Alaska Native	8	0.2%
Asian	46	1.4%
Native Hawaiian and Other Pacific Islander	1	0.0%
Some other race	50	1.5%
Two or more races	210	6.4%
Hispanic or Latino (of any race)	100	3.0%

=== 2000 census ===
As of the census of 2000, there were 2,233 people, 821 households, and 640 families residing in the CDP. The population density was 168.1/km^{2} (435.2/mi^{2}). There were 861 housing units at an average density of 64.8/km^{2} (167.8/mi^{2}). The racial makeup of the CDP was 86.37% White, 0.22% African American, 0.18% Native American, 1.07% Asian, 0.04% Pacific Islander, 0.90% from other races, and 1.21% from two or more races. Hispanic or Latino of any race were 10.3% of the population.

There were 821 households, out of which 30.6% had children under the age of 18 living with them, 65.5% were married couples living together, 9.1% had a female householder with no husband present, and 22.0% were non-families. 18.0% of all households were made up of individuals, and 9.5% had someone living alone who was 65 years of age or older. The average household size was 2.72 and the average family size was 3.07.

In the CDP, the population was spread out, with 23.3% under the age of 18, 6.5% from 18 to 24, 29.3% from 25 to 44, 25.8% from 45 to 64, and 15.0% who were 65 years of age or older. The median age was 40 years. For every 100 females, there were 92.8 males. For every 100 females age 18 and over, there were 93.7 males.

The median income for a household in the CDP was $11,176, and the median income for a family was $17,026. Males had a median income of $5,094 versus $3,813 for females. The per capita income for the CDP was $4,906. About 72.2% of families and 84.2% of the population were below the poverty line, including 51.0% of those under age 18 and 71.0% of those age 65 or over.
