= Bliss Corner, Massachusetts =

- Census-designated place
- Location in Bristol County in Massachusetts
- Coordinates: 41°36′23″N 70°56′31″W
- Country: United States
- State: Massachusetts
- County: Bristol
- Town: Dartmouth

Area
  - Total: 2.00 sq mi (5.19 km^{2})
  - Land: 2.00 sq mi (5.18 km^{2})
  - Water: 0 sq mi (0.00 km^{2})
- Elevation: 66 ft (20 m)

Population (2020)
  - Total: 5,480
  - Density: 2,738.4/sq mi (1,057.31/km^{2})
- Time zone: UTC-5 (Eastern (EST))
  - Summer (DST): UTC-4 (EDT)
- ZIP Code: 02748 (South Dartmouth)
- FIPS code: 25-06170
- GNIS feature ID: 0614393

Bliss Corner is a census-designated place (CDP) in the town of Dartmouth in Bristol County, Massachusetts, United States. As of the 2020 census, Bliss Corner had a population of 5,480.

== Geography ==
Bliss Corner is located at 41°36′23″N 70°56′31″W (41.606464, -70.941827).

According to the United States Census Bureau, the CDP has a total area of 5.2 km^{2} (2.0 sq mi), all land.

== Demographics ==
Historical population
Census	Pop.	Note	%±
2020	5,480		—
U.S. Decennial Census

=== 2020 census ===
As of the 2020 census, Bliss Corner had a population of 5,480. The median age was 51.1 years. 16.8% of residents were under the age of 18 and 29.3% of residents were 65 years of age or older. For every 100 females there were 91.2 males, and for every 100 females age 18 and over there were 87.5 males age 18 and over.

100.0% of residents lived in urban areas, while 0.0% lived in rural areas.

There were 2,329 households in Bliss Corner, of which 22.6% had children under the age of 18 living in them. Of all households, 44.7% were married-couple households, 17.9% were households with a male householder and no spouse or partner present, and 31.0% were households with a female householder and no spouse or partner present. About 33.2% of all households were made up of individuals and 18.9% had someone living alone who was 65 years of age or older.

There were 2,486 housing units, of which 6.3% were vacant. The homeowner vacancy rate was 0.5% and the rental vacancy rate was 3.0%.

Racial composition as of the 2020 census
Race	Number	Percent
White	4,866	88.8%
Black or African American	62	1.1%
American Indian and Alaska Native	9	0.2%
Asian	115	2.1%
Native Hawaiian and Other Pacific Islander	1	0.0%
Some other race	114	2.1%
Two or more races	313	5.7%
Hispanic or Latino (of any race)	176	3.2%

=== 2000 census ===
As of the census of 2000, there were 5,466 people, 2,309 households, and 1,477 families residing in the CDP. The population density was 1,050.0 people /km^{2} (2,719 people/mi^{2}). There were 2,410 housing units at an average density of 462.9 units /km^{2} (1,199 units/mi^{2}). The racial makeup of the CDP was 94.88% White, 0.70% African American, 0.15% Native American, 0.99% Asian, 1.02% from other races, and 2.27% from two or more races. Hispanic or Latino of any race were 0.93% of the population.

There were 2,309 households, out of which 22.6% had children under the age of 18 living with them, 51.0% were married couples living together, 9.4% had a female householder with no husband present, and 36.0% were non-families. 32.6% of all households were made up of individuals, and 23.1% had someone living alone who was 65 years of age or older. The average household size was 2.32 and the average family size was 2.95.

In the CDP, the population was spread out, with 18.1% under the age of 18, 6.5% from 18 to 24, 23.8% from 25 to 44, 23.5% from 45 to 64, and 28.1% who were 65 years of age or older. The median age was 46 years. For every 100 females, there were 85.6 males. For every 100 females age 18 and over, there were 81.3 males.

The median income for a household in the CDP was $36,610, and the median income for a family was $48,125. Males had a median income of $36,026 versus $26,726 for females. The per capita income for the CDP was $22,109. About 2.8% of families and 6.7% of the population were below the poverty line, including 3.4% of those under age 18 and 17.0% of those age 65 or over.
