= Oak Bluffs (CDP), Massachusetts =

Oak Bluffs, Massachusetts
- Census-designated place
- Location in Dukes County in Massachusetts
- Coordinates: 41°27′17″N 70°33′31″W
- Country: United States
- State: Massachusetts
- County: Dukes
- Town: Oak Bluffs

Area
  - Total: 1.91 sq mi (4.94 km^{2})
  - Land: 1.81 sq mi (4.69 km^{2})
  - Water: 0.097 sq mi (0.25 km^{2})
- Elevation: 16 ft (4.9 m)

Population (2020)
  - Total: 2,324
  - Density: 1,284/sq mi (495.6/km^{2})
- Time zone: UTC-5 (Eastern (EST))
  - Summer (DST): UTC-4 (EDT)
- ZIP Codes: 02557 (Oak Bluffs); 02568 (Vineyard Haven)
- Area codes: 508/774
- FIPS code: 25-50425
- GNIS feature ID: 2806312

Oak Bluffs is a census-designated place (CDP) in the town of Oak Bluffs, Dukes County, Massachusetts, United States, on the island of Martha's Vineyard. The Oak Bluffs CDP comprises the most densely settled part of the town, including the neighborhoods of Vineyard Highlands, Harthaven, and part of Eastville.

Oak Bluffs was first listed as a CDP prior to the 2020 census with a population of 2,324.

== Demographics ==
Historical population
Census	Pop.	Note	%±
2020	2,324		—
U.S. Decennial Census; 2020

=== 2020 census ===
Oak Bluffs CDP, Massachusetts – Racial and ethnic composition Note: the US Census treats Hispanic/Latino as an ethnic category. This table excludes Latinos from the racial categories and assigns them to a separate category. Hispanics/Latinos may be of any race.
Race / Ethnicity (NH = Non-Hispanic)	Pop 2020 2020	% 2020
White alone (NH)	1,672	71.94%
Black or African American alone (NH)	201	8.65%
Native American or Alaska Native alone (NH)	32	1.38%
Asian alone (NH)	31	1.33%
Native Hawaiian or Pacific Islander alone (NH)	4	0.17%
Other race alone (NH)	77	3.31%
Mixed race or Multiracial (NH)	232	9.98%
Hispanic or Latino (any race)	75	3.23%
Total	2,324	100.00%
