= Weweantic, Massachusetts =

- Census-designated place
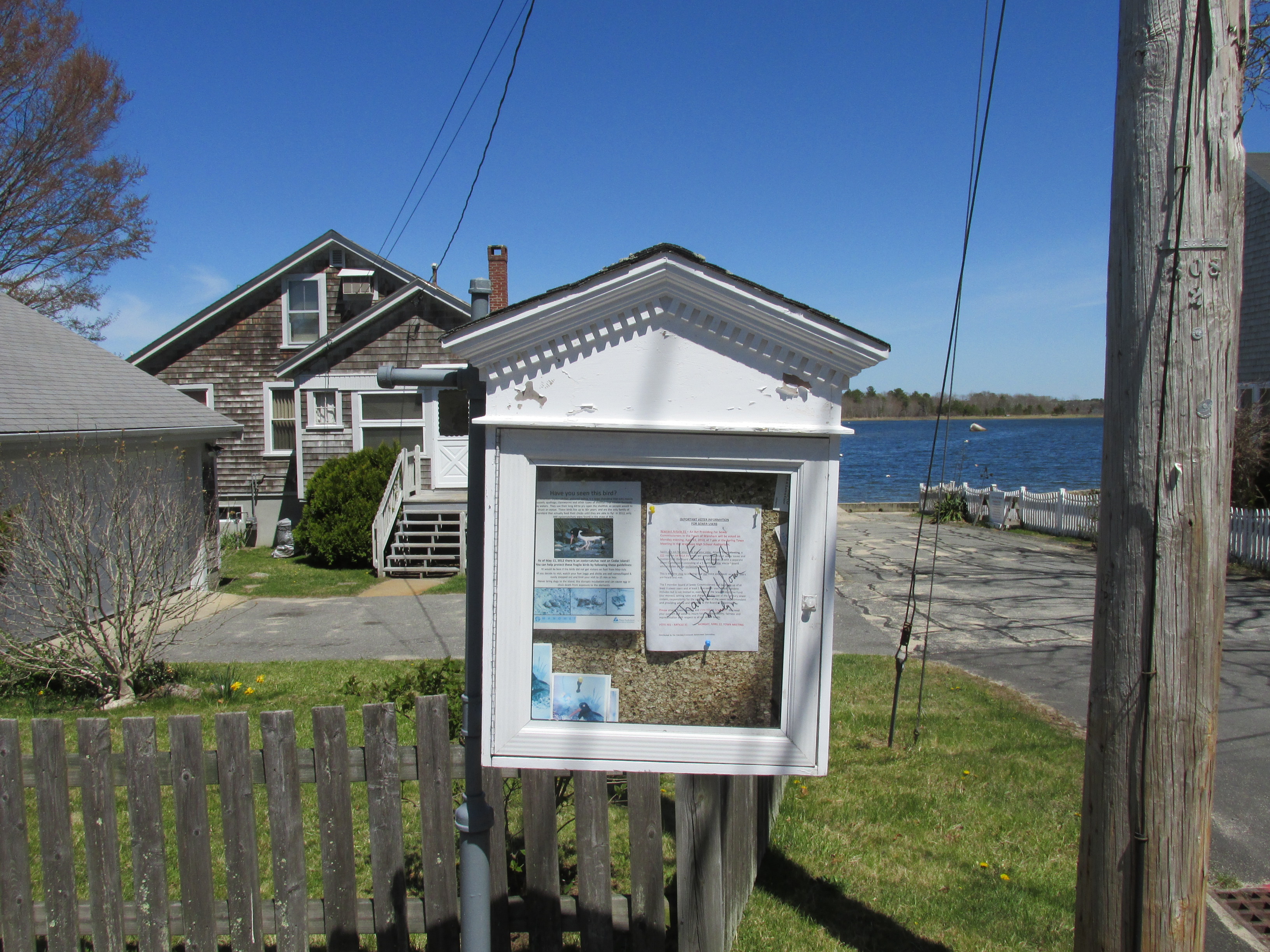
- Community notices

- Location in Plymouth County in Massachusetts
- Coordinates: 41°44′29″N 70°44′21″W
- Country: United States
- State: Massachusetts
- County: Plymouth

Area
  - Total: 1.68 sq mi (4.36 km^{2})
  - Land: 1.27 sq mi (3.29 km^{2})
  - Water: 0.41 sq mi (1.07 km^{2})
- Elevation: 16 ft (5 m)

Population (2020)
  - Total: 2,109
  - Density: 1,662.4/sq mi (641.85/km^{2})
- Time zone: UTC-5 (Eastern (EST))
  - Summer (DST): UTC-4 (EDT)
- ZIP Code: 02571 (Wareham)
- FIPS code: 25-78850
- GNIS feature ID: 1867311

Weweantic is a census-designated place (CDP) in the town of Wareham in Plymouth County, Massachusetts, United States. As of the 2020 census, Weweantic had a population of 2,109.

== Geography ==
Weweantic is located at 41°44′29″N 70°44′21″W (41.741503, -70.739099).

According to the United States Census Bureau, the CDP has a total area of 4.6 km^{2} (1.8 mi^{2}), of which 3.3 km^{2} (1.3 mi^{2}) is land and 1.3 km^{2} (0.5 mi^{2}) (27.84%) is water.

== Demographics ==
Historical population
Census	Pop.	Note	%±
2020	2,109		—
U.S. Decennial Census

=== 2020 census ===
As of the 2020 census, Weweantic had a population of 2,109. The median age was 48.4 years. 17.3% of residents were under the age of 18 and 24.9% of residents were 65 years of age or older. For every 100 females there were 99.5 males, and for every 100 females age 18 and over there were 98.6 males age 18 and over.

100.0% of residents lived in urban areas, while 0.0% lived in rural areas.

There were 862 households in Weweantic, of which 20.6% had children under the age of 18 living in them. Of all households, 46.5% were married-couple households, 16.4% were households with a male householder and no spouse or partner present, and 29.2% were households with a female householder and no spouse or partner present. About 29.8% of all households were made up of individuals and 15.4% had someone living alone who was 65 years of age or older.

There were 1,021 housing units, of which 15.6% were vacant. The homeowner vacancy rate was 0.9% and the rental vacancy rate was 5.0%.

Racial composition as of the 2020 census
Race	Number	Percent
White	1,802	85.4%
Black or African American	49	2.3%
American Indian and Alaska Native	6	0.3%
Asian	9	0.4%
Native Hawaiian and Other Pacific Islander	0	0.0%
Some other race	61	2.9%
Two or more races	182	8.6%
Hispanic or Latino (of any race)	51	2.4%

=== 2000 census ===
As of the census of 2000, there were 1,903 people, 730 households, and 522 families residing in the CDP. The population density was 578.5/km^{2} (1,500.0/mi^{2}). There were 857 housing units at an average density of 260.5/km^{2} (675.5/mi^{2}). The racial makeup of the CDP was 89.07% White, 2.79% African American, 0.95% Native American, 0.47% Asian, 3.84% from other races, and 2.89% from two or more races. Hispanic or Latino of any race were 1.26% of the population.

There were 730 households, out of which 27.8% had children under the age of 18 living with them, 53.8% were married couples living together, 12.3% had a female householder with no husband present, and 28.4% were non-families. 24.8% of all households were made up of individuals, and 11.1% had someone living alone who was 65 years of age or older. The average household size was 2.61 and the average family size was 3.08.

In the CDP, the population was spread out, with 24.7% under the age of 18, 6.8% from 18 to 24, 27.9% from 25 to 44, 25.5% from 45 to 64, and 15.1% who were 65 years of age or older. The median age was 40 years. For every 100 females, there were 95.4 males. For every 100 females age 18 and over, there were 88.6 males.

The median income for a household in the CDP was $47,895, and the median income for a family was $50,192. Males had a median income of $45,188 versus $27,303 for females. The per capita income for the CDP was $23,286. About 6.0% of families and 9.0% of the population were below the poverty line, including 20.8% of those under age 18 and 3.7% of those age 65 or over.
