= Bellingham (CDP), Massachusetts =

Bellingham, Massachusetts
- Census-designated place
- Location in Norfolk County in Massachusetts
- Coordinates: 42°5′53″N 71°28′36″W
- Country: United States
- State: Massachusetts
- County: Norfolk
- Town: Bellingham

Area
  - Total: 5.49 sq mi (14.22 km^{2})
  - Land: 5.39 sq mi (13.96 km^{2})
  - Water: 0.097 sq mi (0.25 km^{2})
- Elevation: 300 ft (90 m)

Population (2020)
  - Total: 4,782
  - Density: 886.9/sq mi (342.43/km^{2})
- Time zone: UTC-5 (Eastern (EST))
  - Summer (DST): UTC-4 (EDT)
- ZIP code: 02019
- Area code: 508
- FIPS code: 25-04965
- GNIS feature ID: 0611653

Bellingham is a census-designated place (CDP) in the town of Bellingham in Norfolk County, Massachusetts, United States. The population was 4,854 at the 2010 census.

== Geography ==
Bellingham is located at 42°5′53″N 71°28′36″W (42.098072, -71.476715).

According to the United States Census Bureau, the CDP has a total area of 13.9 km^{2} (5.4 sq mi), of which 13.7 km^{2} (5.3 sq mi) is land and 0.2 km^{2} (0.077 sq mi) (1.49%) is water.

== Demographics ==
Historical population
Census	Pop.	Note	%±
2020	4,782		—
U.S. Decennial Census

As of the census of 2000, there were 4,497 people, 1,675 households, and 1,254 families residing in the CDP. The population density was 328.8 people/km^{2} (852 people/mi^{2}). There were 1,691 housing units at an average density of 123.7 units/km^{2} (320 units/mi^{2}). The racial makeup of the CDP was 96.18% White, 1.20% Black or African American, 0.13% Native American, 0.76% Asian, 0.07% Pacific Islander, 0.53% from other races, and 1.13% from two or more races. Hispanic or Latino of any race were 1.42% of the population.

There were 1,675 households, out of which 36.7% had children under the age of 18 living with them, 62.0% were married couples living together, 9.1% had a female householder with no husband present, and 25.1% were non-families. 20.9% of all households were made up of individuals, and 7.7% had someone living alone who was 65 years of age or older. The average household size was 2.68 and the average family size was 3.13.

In the CDP, the population was spread out, with 26.4% under the age of 18, 5.5% from 18 to 24, 34.8% from 25 to 44, 24.0% from 45 to 64, and 9.3% who were 65 years of age or older. The median age was 36 years. For every 100 females, there were 93.1 males. For every 100 females age 18 and over, there were 89.3 males.

The median income for a household in the CDP was $64,167, and the median income for a family was $71,344. Males had a median income of $47,113 versus $29,871 for females. The per capita income for the CDP was $24,633. About 1.2% of families and 2.6% of the population were below the poverty line, including 2.9% of those under age 18 and 11.2% of those age 65 or over.
