= Mattapoisett Center, Massachusetts =

- Census-designated place
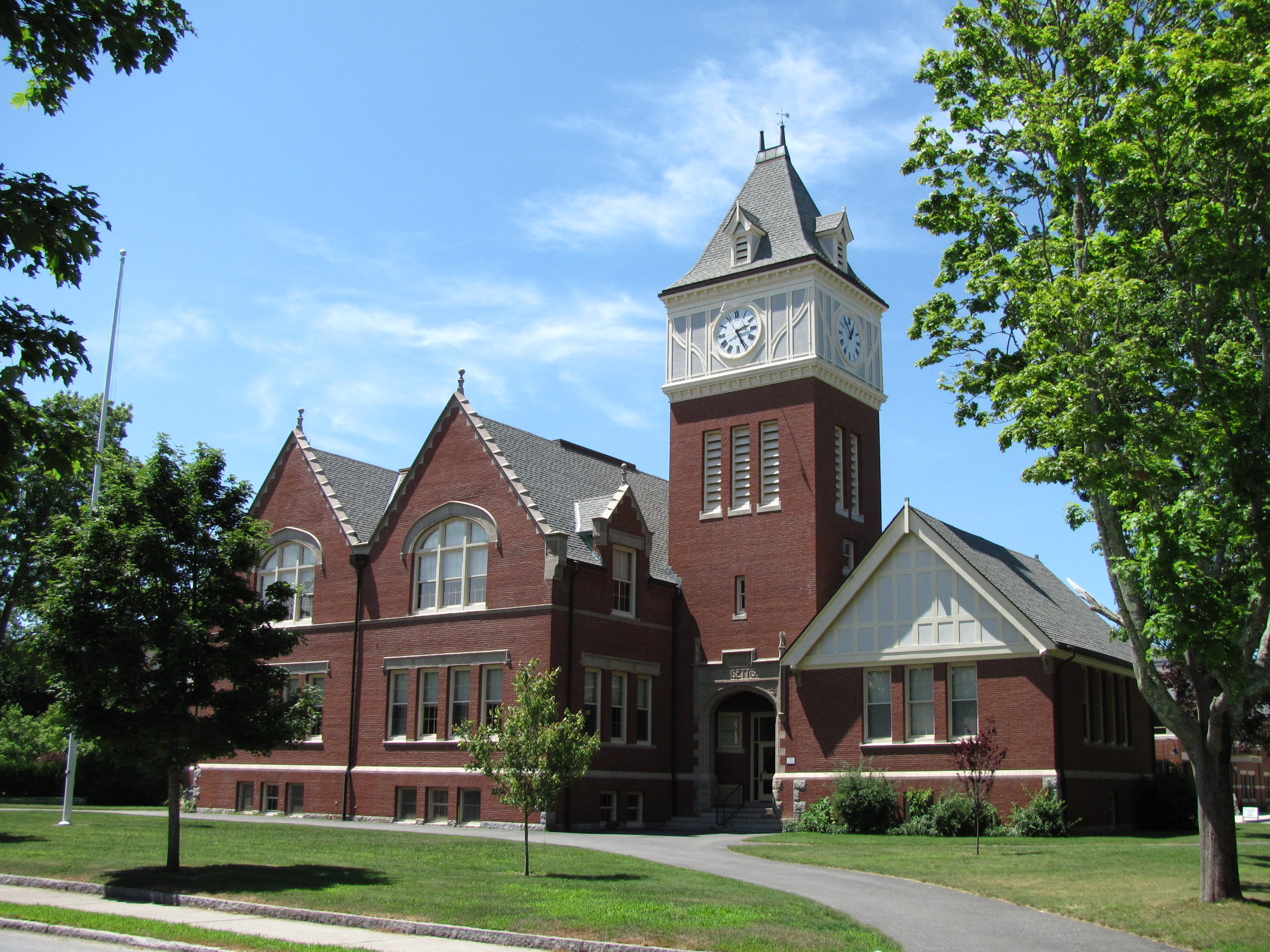
- Center School, the K-3 public school in Mattapoisett.

- Location in Plymouth County in Massachusetts
- Coordinates: 41°39′38″N 70°48′8″W
- Country: United States
- State: Massachusetts
- County: Plymouth

Area
  - Total: 4.95 sq mi (12.83 km^{2})
  - Land: 4.89 sq mi (12.67 km^{2})
  - Water: 0.066 sq mi (0.17 km^{2})

Population (2020)
  - Total: 3,190
  - Density: 652.2/sq mi (251.82/km^{2})
- Time zone: UTC-5 (Eastern (EST))
  - Summer (DST): UTC-4 (EDT)
- ZIP Code: 02739 (Mattapoisett)
- FIPS code: 25-39485

Mattapoisett Center is a census-designated place (CDP) in the town of Mattapoisett in Plymouth County, Massachusetts. As of the 2020 census, Mattapoisett Center had a population of 3,190.

== Geography ==
Mattapoisett Center is located at 41°39′38″N 70°48′8″W (41.660688, -70.802310).

According to the United States Census Bureau, the CDP has a total area of 4.4 square miles (11 km^{2}).

== Demographics ==
Historical population
Census	Pop.	Note	%±
2020	3,190		—
U.S. Decennial Census

=== 2020 census ===
As of the 2020 census, Mattapoisett Center had a population of 3,190. The median age was 53.7 years. 16.1% of residents were under the age of 18 and 30.6% of residents were 65 years of age or older. For every 100 females there were 86.5 males, and for every 100 females age 18 and over there were 84.4 males age 18 and over.

89.0% of residents lived in urban areas, while 11.0% lived in rural areas.

There were 1,466 households in Mattapoisett Center, of which 22.1% had children under the age of 18 living in them. Of all households, 50.3% were married-couple households, 15.6% were households with a male householder and no spouse or partner present, and 28.4% were households with a female householder and no spouse or partner present. About 32.9% of all households were made up of individuals and 18.9% had someone living alone who was 65 years of age or older.

There were 1,805 housing units, of which 18.8% were vacant. The homeowner vacancy rate was 1.4% and the rental vacancy rate was 3.3%.

Racial composition as of the 2020 census
Race	Number	Percent
White	2,975	93.3%
Black or African American	8	0.3%
American Indian and Alaska Native	9	0.3%
Asian	33	1.0%
Native Hawaiian and Other Pacific Islander	2	0.1%
Some other race	39	1.2%
Two or more races	124	3.9%
Hispanic or Latino (of any race)	51	1.6%

=== 2000 census ===
At the 2000 census, there were 2,966 people, 1,283 households and 822 families residing in the CDP. The population density was 666.8 inhabitants per square mile (257.5/km^{2}). There were 1,571 housing units at an average density of 353.2 per square mile (136.4/km^{2}). The racial makeup of the CDP was 96.12% White, 0.98% African American, 0.07% Native American, 0.91% Asian, 1.21% from other races, and 0.71% from two or more races. Hispanic or Latino of any race were 0.78% of the population.

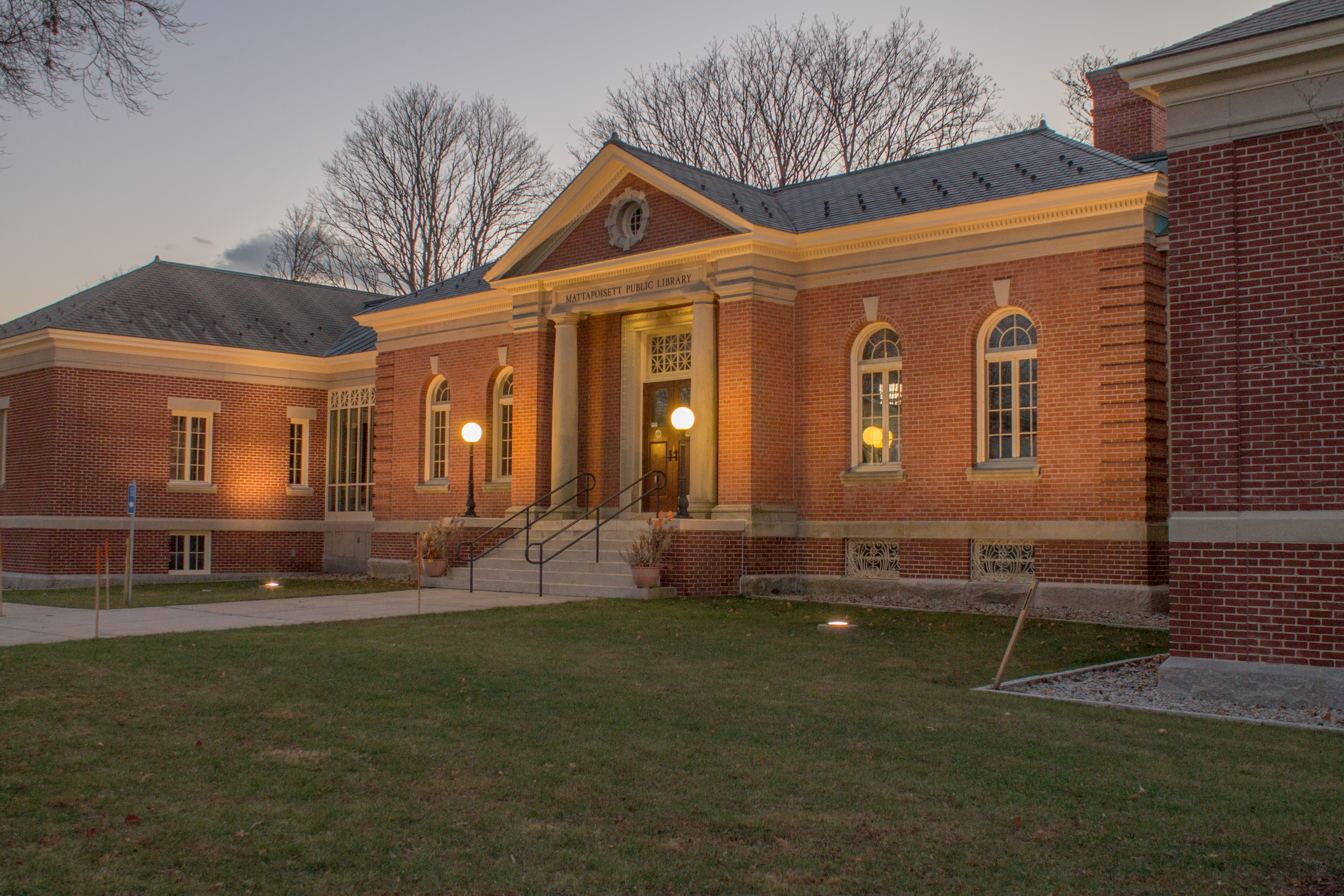
The Mattapoisett Free Public Library

There were 1,283 households, of which 27.3% had children under the age of 18 living with them, 50.0% were married couples living together, 10.8% had a female householder with no husband present, and 35.9% were non-families. 31.0% of all households were made up of individuals, and 16.0% had someone living alone who was 65 years of age or older. The average household size was 2.29 and the average family size was 2.87.

22.5% of the population were under the age of 18, 4.2% from 18 to 24, 25.8% from 25 to 44, 28.3% from 45 to 64, and 19.3% who were 65 years of age or older. The median age was 44 years. For every 100 females, there were 87.1 males. For every 100 females age 18 and over, there were 82.4 males.

The median household income was $54,107 and the median family income was $65,893. Males had a median income of $51,477 versus $35,950 for females. The per capita income for the CDP was $28,758. About 3.6% of families and 5.3% of the population were below the poverty line, including 4.3% of those under age 18 and 4.7% of those age 65 or over.
