= Wareham Center, Massachusetts =

- Census-designated place
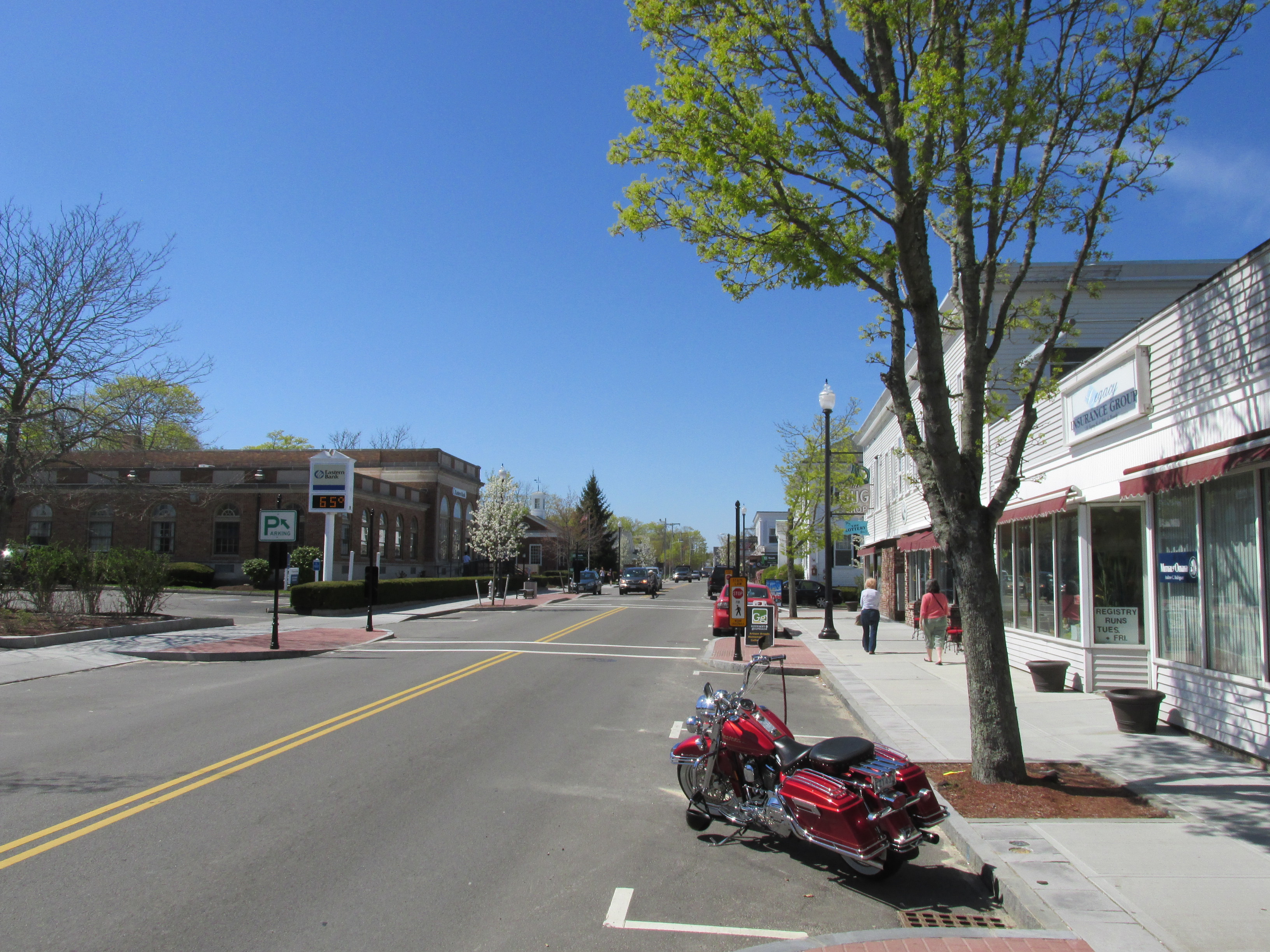
- Main Street

- Location in Plymouth County in Massachusetts
- Coordinates: 41°44′47″N 70°43′5″W
- Country: United States
- State: Massachusetts
- County: Plymouth

Area
  - Total: 2.15 sq mi (5.56 km^{2})
  - Land: 1.62 sq mi (4.19 km^{2})
  - Water: 0.53 sq mi (1.37 km^{2})
- Elevation: 36 ft (11 m)

Population (2020)
  - Total: 2,972
  - Density: 1,838.2/sq mi (709.73/km^{2})
- Time zone: UTC-5 (Eastern (EST))
  - Summer (DST): UTC-4 (EDT)
- ZIP Code: 02571 (Wareham)
- FIPS code: 25-73020
- GNIS feature ID: 0615457

Wareham Center is a census-designated place (CDP) in the town of Wareham in Plymouth County, Massachusetts, United States. As of the 2020 census, Wareham Center had a population of 2,972.

== Geography ==
Wareham Center is located at 41°44′47″N 70°43′5″W (41.746332, -70.718018).

According to the United States Census Bureau, the CDP has a total area of 5.1 km^{2} (2.0 mi^{2}), of which 3.9 km^{2} (1.5 mi^{2}) is land and 1.2 km^{2} (0.4 mi^{2}) (23.08%) is water.

== Demographics ==
Historical population
Census	Pop.	Note	%±
2020	2,972		—
U.S. Decennial Census

=== 2020 census ===
As of the 2020 census, Wareham Center had a population of 2,972. The median age was 50.0 years. 15.8% of residents were under the age of 18 and 23.4% of residents were 65 years of age or older. For every 100 females there were 94.1 males, and for every 100 females age 18 and over there were 91.7 males age 18 and over.

100.0% of residents lived in urban areas, while 0.0% lived in rural areas.

There were 1,447 households in Wareham Center, of which 19.4% had children under the age of 18 living in them. Of all households, 30.3% were married-couple households, 23.9% were households with a male householder and no spouse or partner present, and 37.1% were households with a female householder and no spouse or partner present. About 39.7% of all households were made up of individuals and 19.2% had someone living alone who was 65 years of age or older.

There were 2,082 housing units, of which 30.5% were vacant. The homeowner vacancy rate was 0.8% and the rental vacancy rate was 3.3%.

Racial composition as of the 2020 census
Race	Number	Percent
White	2,490	83.8%
Black or African American	63	2.1%
American Indian and Alaska Native	19	0.6%
Asian	42	1.4%
Native Hawaiian and Other Pacific Islander	0	0.0%
Some other race	105	3.5%
Two or more races	253	8.5%
Hispanic or Latino (of any race)	85	2.9%

=== 2000 census ===
As of the census of 2000, there were 2,874 people, 1,254 households, and 719 families residing in the CDP. The population density was 734.9/km^{2} (1,907.2/mi^{2}). There were 1,871 housing units at an average density of 478.4/km^{2} (1,241.6/mi^{2}). The racial makeup of the CDP was 90.33% White, 2.33% African American, 0.49% Native American, 0.24% Asian, 0.03% Pacific Islander, 2.71% from other races, and 3.86% from two or more races. Hispanic or Latino of any race were 1.11% of the population.

There were 1,254 households, out of which 27.1% had children under the age of 18 living with them, 37.1% were married couples living together, 15.0% had a female householder with no husband present, and 42.6% were non-families. 35.6% of all households were made up of individuals, and 15.2% had someone living alone who was 65 years of age or older. The average household size was 2.27 and the average family size was 2.96.

In the CDP, the population was spread out, with 23.7% under the age of 18, 6.9% from 18 to 24, 28.8% from 25 to 44, 24.0% from 45 to 64, and 16.6% who were 65 years of age or older. The median age was 39 years. For every 100 females, there were 92.6 males. For every 100 females age 18 and over, there were 87.6 males.

The median income for a household in the CDP was $31,042, and the median income for a family was $43,984. Males had a median income of $39,315 versus $28,715 for females. The per capita income for the CDP was $24,803. About 11.0% of families and 14.0% of the population were below the poverty line, including 19.0% of those under age 18 and 17.4% of those age 65 or over.
