= Dover (CDP), Massachusetts =

Dover, Massachusetts
- Census-designated place
- Location in Norfolk County in Massachusetts
- Coordinates: 42°14′28″N 71°16′35″W
- Country: United States
- State: Massachusetts
- County: Norfolk
- Town: Dover

Area
  - Total: 4.36 sq mi (11.28 km^{2})
  - Land: 4.24 sq mi (10.98 km^{2})
  - Water: 0.11 sq mi (0.29 km^{2})
- Elevation: 174 ft (53 m)

Population (2020)
  - Total: 2,452
  - Density: 578.2/sq mi (223.23/km^{2})
- Time zone: UTC-5 (Eastern (EST))
  - Summer (DST): UTC-4 (EDT)
- ZIP code: 02030
- Area code: 508
- FIPS code: 25-17370
- GNIS feature ID: 0611917

Dover is a census-designated place (CDP) in the town of Dover in Norfolk County, Massachusetts, United States. The population was 2,265 at the 2010 census.

== Geography ==
Dover is located at 42°14′27″N 71°16′35″W (42.241021, -71.276515).

According to the United States Census Bureau, the CDP has a total area of 11.3 km^{2} (4.4 sq mi), all land.

== Demographics ==
Historical population
Census	Pop.	Note	%±
2020	2,452		—
U.S. Decennial Census

As of the census of 2000, there were 2,216 people, 745 households, and 625 families residing in the CDP. The population density was 195.8 people/km^{2} (507 people/mi^{2}). There were 760 housing units at an average density of 67.1 units/km^{2} (174 units/mi^{2}). The racial makeup of the CDP was 96.39% White, 0.09% Black or African American, 2.98% Asian, 0.05% from other races, and 0.50% from two or more races. Hispanic or Latino of any race were 1.04% of the population.

There were 745 households, out of which 45.1% had children under the age of 18 living with them, 74.6% were married couples living together, 6.7% had a female householder with no husband present, and 16.1% were non-families. 14.1% of all households were made up of individuals, and 7.0% had someone living alone who was 65 years of age or older. The average household size was 2.97 and the average family size was 3.29.

In the CDP, the population was spread out, with 31.4% under the age of 18, 3.8% from 18 to 24, 23.5% from 25 to 44, 29.9% from 45 to 64, and 11.4% who were 65 years of age or older. The median age was 40 years. For every 100 females, there were 91.7 males. For every 100 females age 18 and over, there were 91.0 males.

The median income for a household in the CDP was $143,312, and the median income for a family was $153,789. Males had a median income of $100,000 versus $62,500 for females. The per capita income for the CDP was $64,922. About 2.2% of families and 2.4% of the population were below the poverty line, including 3.9% of those under age 18 and 2.5% of those age 65 or over.
