= Hingham (CDP), Massachusetts =

Hingham, Massachusetts
- Census-designated place
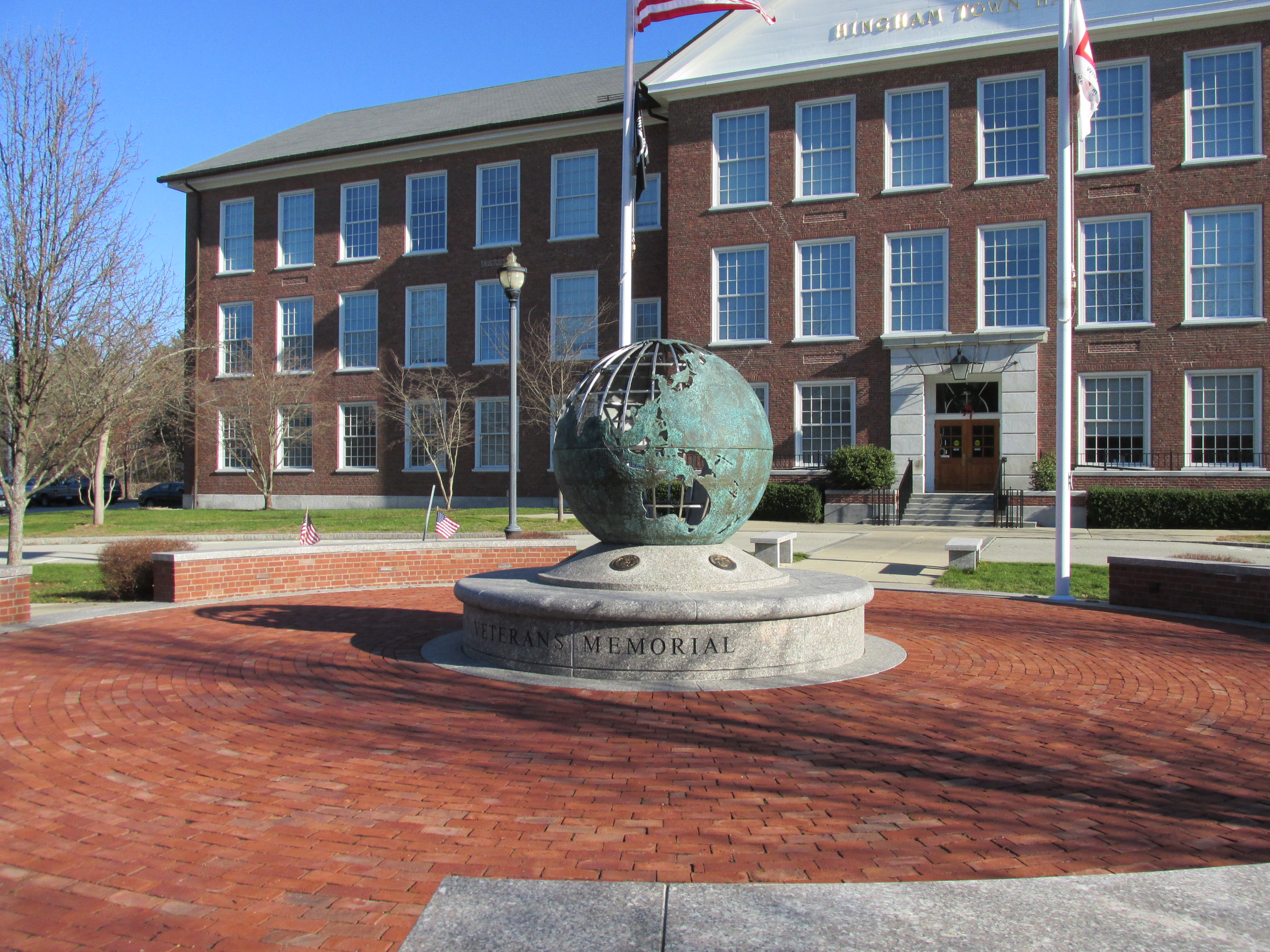
- Veterans Memorial and Town Hall

- Location in Plymouth County in Massachusetts
- Coordinates: 42°14′14″N 70°53′14″W
- Country: United States
- State: Massachusetts
- County: Plymouth

Area
  - Total: 3.16 sq mi (8.18 km^{2})
  - Land: 3.10 sq mi (8.02 km^{2})
  - Water: 0.062 sq mi (0.16 km^{2})
- Elevation: 16 ft (5 m)

Population (2020)
  - Total: 5,979
  - Density: 1,930.1/sq mi (745.21/km^{2})
- Time zone: UTC-5 (Eastern (EST))
  - Summer (DST): UTC-4 (EDT)
- ZIP codes: 02043, 02044
- Area code: 781
- FIPS code: 25-30175
- GNIS feature ID: 0613354

Hingham is a census-designated place (CDP) in the town of Hingham in Plymouth County, Massachusetts, United States. The population was 5,650 at the 2010 census.

== Geography ==
Hingham is located at 42°14′14″N 70°53′13″W (42.237299, -70.887152).

According to the United States Census Bureau, the CDP has a total area of 8.2 km^{2} (3.2 sq mi), of which 8.1 km^{2} (3.1 sq mi) is land and 0.1 km^{2} (0.039 sq mi) (0.95%) is water.

== Demographics ==
Historical population
| Census | Pop. | Note | %± |
|---|---|---|---|
| 2020 | 5,979 | | — |
U.S. Decennial Census

As of the census of 2000, there were 22,157 people, 2,023 households, and 1,476 families residing in the CDP. The population density was 662.3 people/km^{2} (1,715 people/mi^{2}). There were 2,071 housing units at an average density of 256.3 units/km^{2} (664 units/mi^{2}). The racial makeup of the CDP was 98.34% White, 0.15% Black or African American, 0.02% Native American, 0.39% Asian, 0.30% from other races, and 0.80% from two or more races. Hispanic or Latino of any race were 0.47% of the population.

There were 2,023 households, out of which 36.7% had children under the age of 18 living with them, 63.5% were married couples living together, 7.7% had a female householder with no husband present, and 27.0% were non-families. 24.4% of all households were made up of individuals, and 13.5% had someone living alone who was 65 years of age or older. The average household size was 2.64 and the average family size was 3.18.

In the CDP, the population was spread out, with 28.0% under the age of 18, 4.3% from 18 to 24, 27.5% from 25 to 44, 26.2% from 45 to 64, and 14.0% who were 65 years of age or older. The median age was 40 years. For every 100 females, there were 88.6 males. For every 100 females age 18 and over, there were 85.5 males.

The median income for a household in the CDP was $86,574, and the median income for a family was $102,536. Males had a median income of $72,467 versus $47,868 for females. The per capita income for the CDP was $43,980. About 2.7% of families and 5.8% of the population were below the poverty line, including 10.0% of those under age 18 and 6.2% of those age 65 or over.
