= Edgartown (CDP), Massachusetts =

Edgartown, Massachusetts
- Census-designated place
- Location in Dukes County in Massachusetts
- Coordinates: 41°23′22″N 70°31′3″W
- Country: United States
- State: Massachusetts
- County: Dukes
- Town: Edgartown

Area
  - Total: 1.20 sq mi (3.11 km^{2})
  - Land: 1.20 sq mi (3.10 km^{2})
  - Water: 0.0039 sq mi (0.01 km^{2})
- Elevation: 16 ft (4.9 m)

Population (2020)
  - Total: 1,107
  - Density: 926.3/sq mi (357.63/km^{2})
- Time zone: UTC-5 (Eastern (EST))
  - Summer (DST): UTC-4 (EDT)
- ZIP Code: 02539
- Area codes: 508/774
- FIPS code: 25-21115
- GNIS feature ID: 2631319

Edgartown is a census-designated place (CDP) comprising the primary settlement in the town of Edgartown, Dukes County, Massachusetts, United States, on the island of Martha's Vineyard. The CDP also includes the neighborhood of Clevelandtown.

Edgartown was first listed as a CDP after the 2010 census with a population of 1,107

== Demographics ==
Historical population
Census	Pop.	Note	%±
2020	1,107		—
U.S. Decennial Census 2020

=== 2020 census ===
Edgartown CDP, Massachusetts – Racial and ethnic composition Note: the US Census treats Hispanic/Latino as an ethnic category. This table excludes Latinos from the racial categories and assigns them to a separate category. Hispanics/Latinos may be of any race.
Race / Ethnicity (NH = Non-Hispanic)	Pop 2020	% 2020
White alone (NH)	891	80.49%
Black or African American alone (NH)	20	1.81%
Native American or Alaska Native alone (NH)	3	0.27%
Asian alone (NH)	10	0.90%
Native Hawaiian or Pacific Islander alone (NH)	1	0.09%
Other race alone (NH)	33	2.98%
Mixed race or Multiracial (NH)	104	9.39%
Hispanic or Latino (any race)	45	4.07%
Total	1,107	100.00%
