= Marion Center, Massachusetts =

Community in Massachusetts, US

- Census-designated place
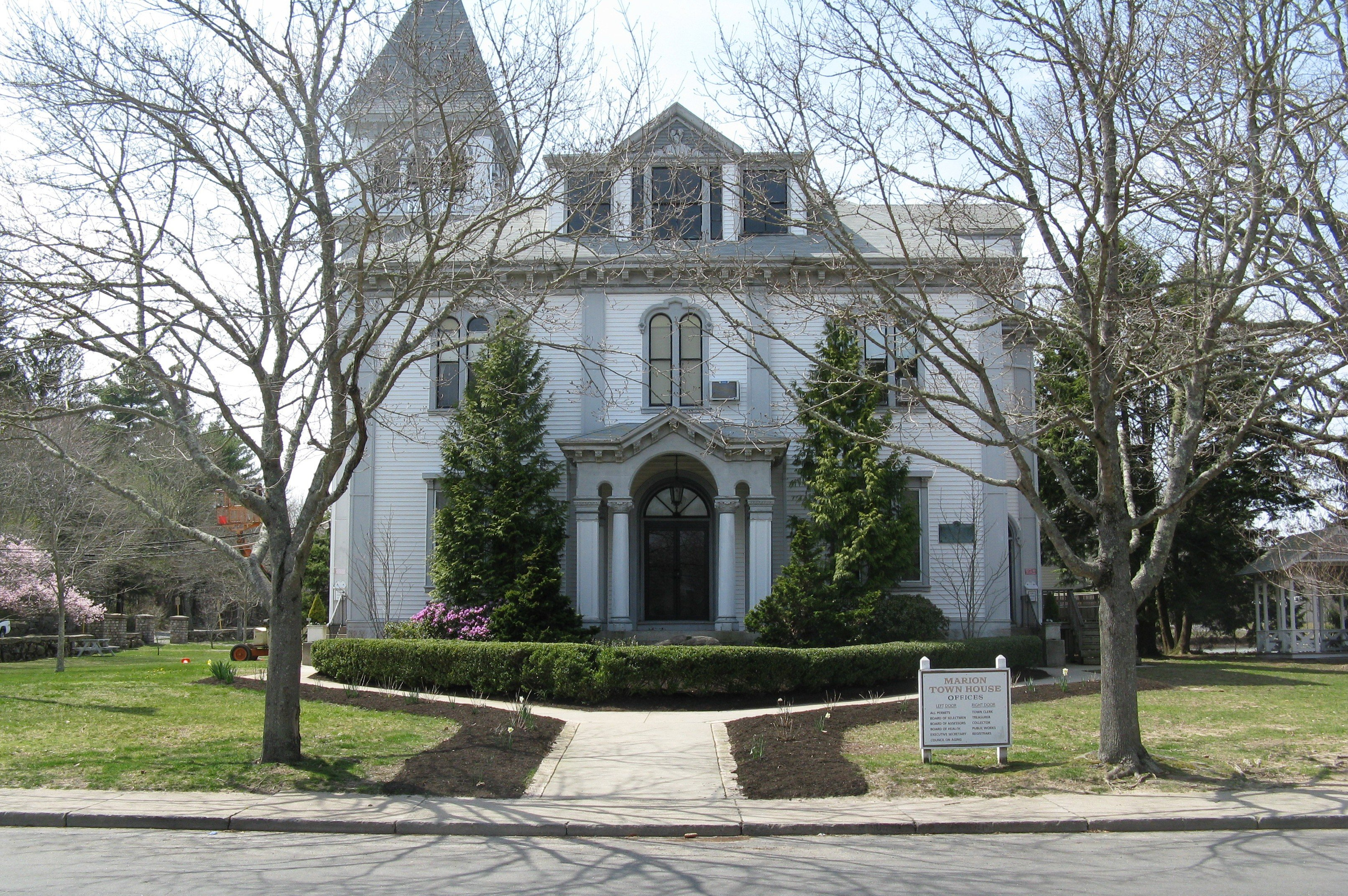
- Marion Town House

- Location in Plymouth County in Massachusetts
- Coordinates: 41°42′5″N 70°45′51″W
- Country: United States
- State: Massachusetts
- County: Plymouth

Area
  - Total: 1.12 sq mi (2.90 km^{2})
  - Land: 1.02 sq mi (2.65 km^{2})
  - Water: 0.093 sq mi (0.24 km^{2})

Population (2020)
  - Total: 1,172
  - Density: 1,143.8/sq mi (441.61/km^{2})
- Time zone: UTC-5 (Eastern (EST))
  - Summer (DST): UTC-4 (EDT)
- ZIP Code: 02738 (Marion)
- FIPS code: 25-38575

Marion Center is a census-designated place (CDP) in the town of Marion in Plymouth County, Massachusetts, United States. As of the 2020 census, Marion Center had a population of 1,172.

== Geography ==
Marion Center is located at 41°42′5″N 70°45′51″W (41.701360, -70.764074).

C According to the United States Census Bureau, the CDP has a total area of 2.9 km^{2} (1.1 mi^{2}) of which 2.7 km^{2} (1.0 mi^{2}) is land and 0.3 km^{2} (0.1 mi^{2}) (8.85%) is water.

== Climate ==
The town of Marion, Massachusetts is a part of the South Coast (Massachusetts) of Massachusetts, has a Humid continental climate, bordering on either an Oceanic climate, or Subtropics, typical of its location. Which is characterized by warm, humid summers, and cold to freezing winters, according to NOAA Weather Radio, with temperatures regularly dropping below freezing throughout the season. The maritime influence helps regulate the temperatures somewhat, leading to milder winters, and cooler summers, as the town of Marion is bordering on the Buzzards Bay.

== Demographics ==
Historical population
Census	Pop.	Note	%±
2020	1,172		—
U.S. Decennial Census

As of the census of 2000, there were 1,202 people, 542 households, and 337 families residing in the CDP. The population density was 450.6/km^{2} (1,172.2/mi^{2}). There were 640 housing units at an average density of 239.9/km^{2} (624.1/mi^{2}). The racial makeup of the CDP was 97.84% White, 0.42% African American, 0.08% Native American, 0.17% Asian, 1.25% from other races, and 0.25% from two or more races. Hispanic or Latino of any race were 0.33% of the population.

There were 542 households, out of which 24.4% had children under the age of 18 living with them, 53.7% were married couples living together, 7.0% had a female householder with no husband present, and 37.8% were non-families. 34.5% of all households were made up of individuals, and 16.2% had someone living alone who was 65 years of age or older. The average household size was 2.22 and the average family size was 2.89.

In the CDP, the population was spread out, with 22.5% under the age of 18, 3.2% from 18 to 24, 22.7% from 25 to 44, 30.3% from 45 to 64, and 21.3% who were 65 years of age or older. The median age was 46 years. For every 100 females, there were 92.9 males. For every 100 females age 18 and over, there were 82.9 males.

The median income for a household in the CDP was $59,583, and the median income for a family was $82,503. Males had a median income of $41,587 versus $36,875 for females. The per capita income for the CDP was $40,856. About 3.3% of families and 1.7% of the population were below the poverty line, including none of those under the age of eighteen or sixty-five or over.
