= Shawkemo, Massachusetts =

Shawkemo
- Village
- Location within the state of Massachusetts
- Coordinates: 41°17′40″N 70°3′28″W
- Country: United States
- State: Massachusetts
- County: Nantucket
- Elevation: 16 ft (4.9 m)
- Time zone: UTC-5 (Eastern (EST))
  - Summer (DST): UTC-4 (EDT)
- GNIS feature ID: 616958

Shawkemo (also Middle Field Land, Shawaukema, or The) is a village in Nantucket, Massachusetts, United States. Its elevation is 16 feet (4.9 m). The name Shawkemo is an Indian word meaning "middle field of land". Shawkemo lies 4 miles (6.4 km) west-northwest of Siasconset.
