= Adamsville, Colrain, Massachusetts =

Settlement in Colrain, Massachusetts, U.S.

Coordinates: 42°40′52″N 72°45′1″W

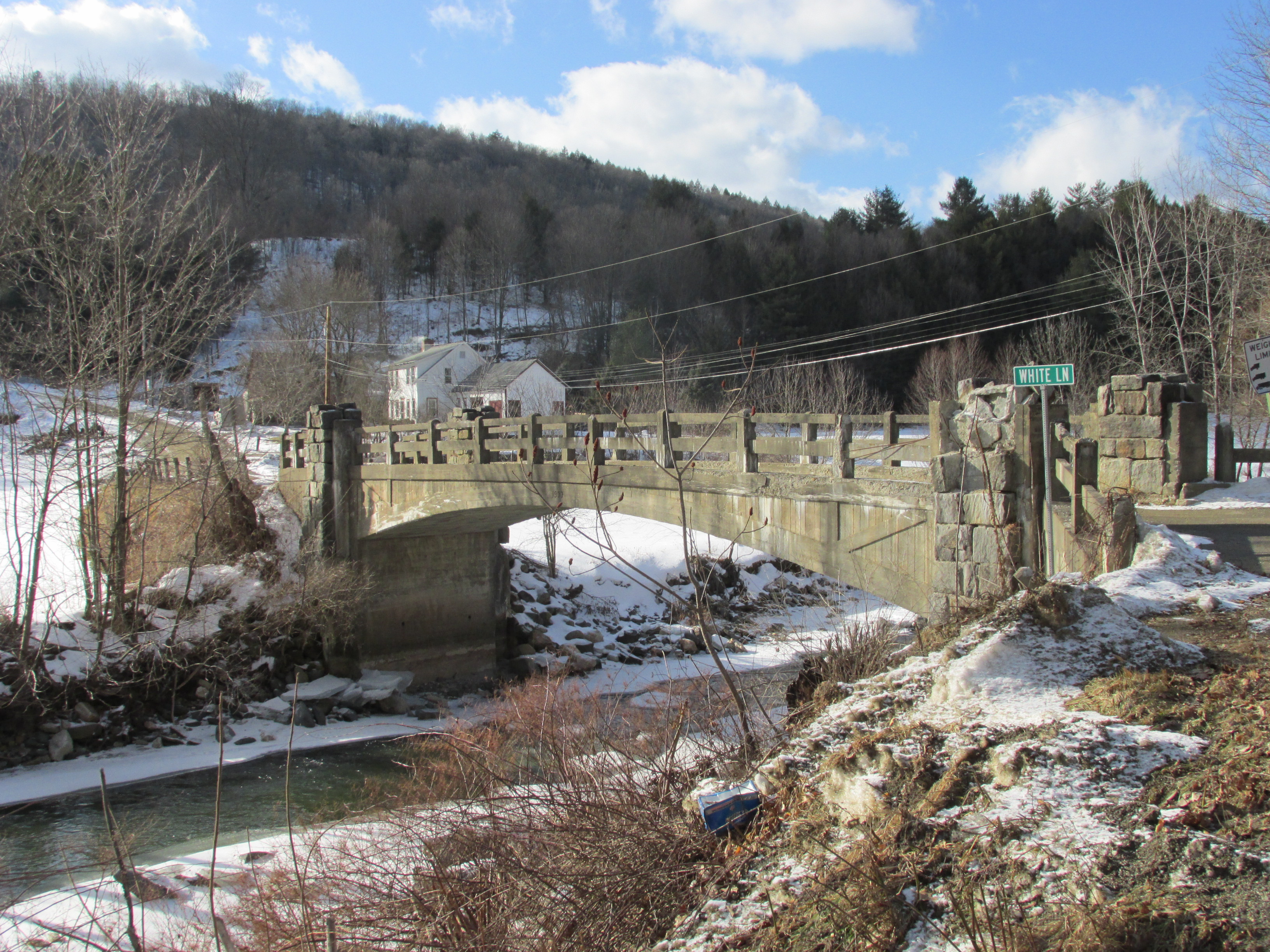
Bridge over the West Branch North River

Adamsville is a settlement in the municipality of Colrain, Massachusetts.

== Geography ==
Adamsville is bounded by Heath to the west, Shelburne to the south, Halifax to the north, and the Leyden border to the east. It is connected via a bridge over the Connecticut River to Greenfield. Greenfield is famous for Rocky Mountain Park, the Stoneleigh-Burnham School and Greenfield Community College.

== Amenities ==
Around Colrain visitors can find a diverse landscape of valleys, low hills and slopes, and farms with fertile plain. The various villages have buildings clustered and scattered. The small Adamsville community is the extreme northwest corner of Colrain, not far from the Vermont and Massachusetts border and the Town of Heath. From Adamsville one can hike northeast to H.O. Cook State Forest to an elevation of 722 feet, or west through the Town of Heath to reach Pelham Lake Park in the Town of Rowe, Massachusetts.
