= List of villages in Massachusetts =

This is a list of villages in Massachusetts, arranged alphabetically.

In Massachusetts, villages usually do not have any official legal status; all villages are part of an incorporated municipality (town or city - see List of municipalities in Massachusetts) which is the smallest official form of government. The terms "community", "district", "neighborhood", and "section" are often used to describe these non-municipal entities, which vary considerably in size and relative geographic isolation. Boundaries are sometimes ambiguous, though the United States Census uses the term census-designated place when it assigns boundaries to these entities (based on local usage) for the purpose of tabulating community demographics. Many villages have neighborhood associations.

== Active ==
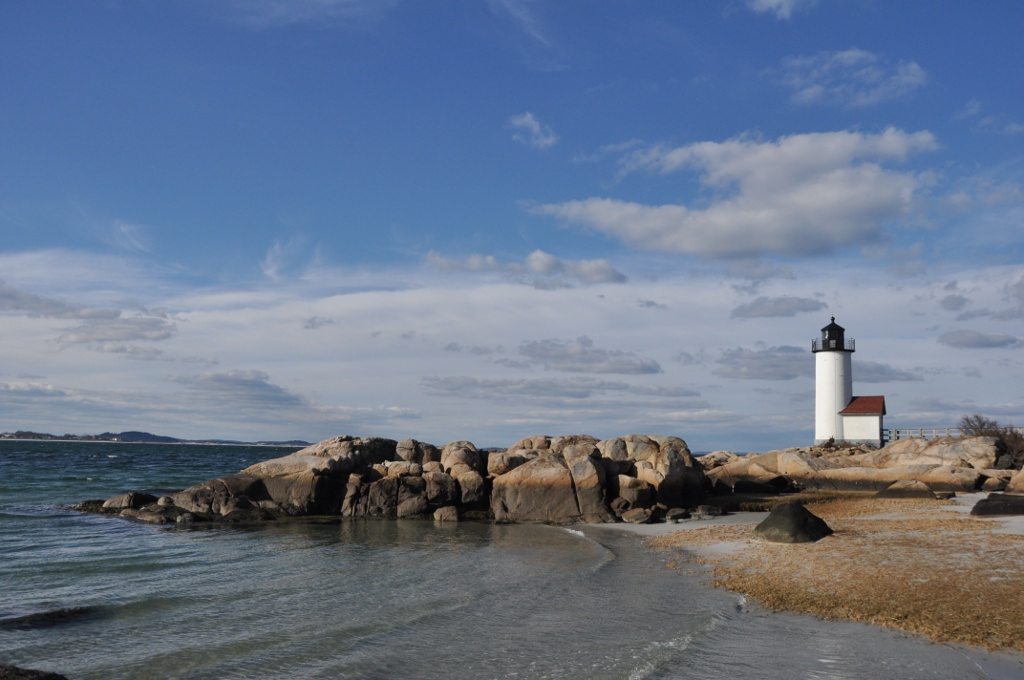
Annisquam

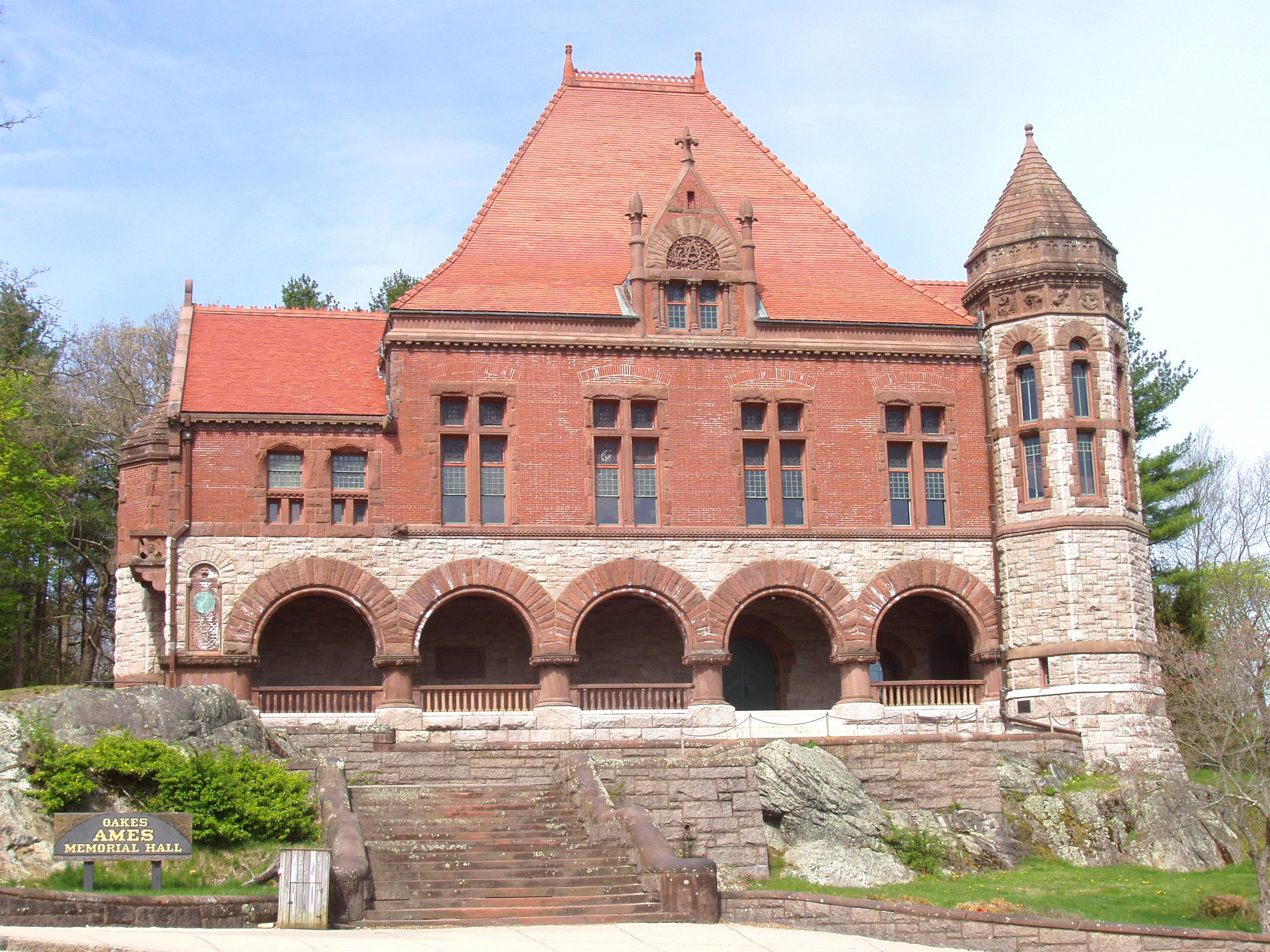
North Easton

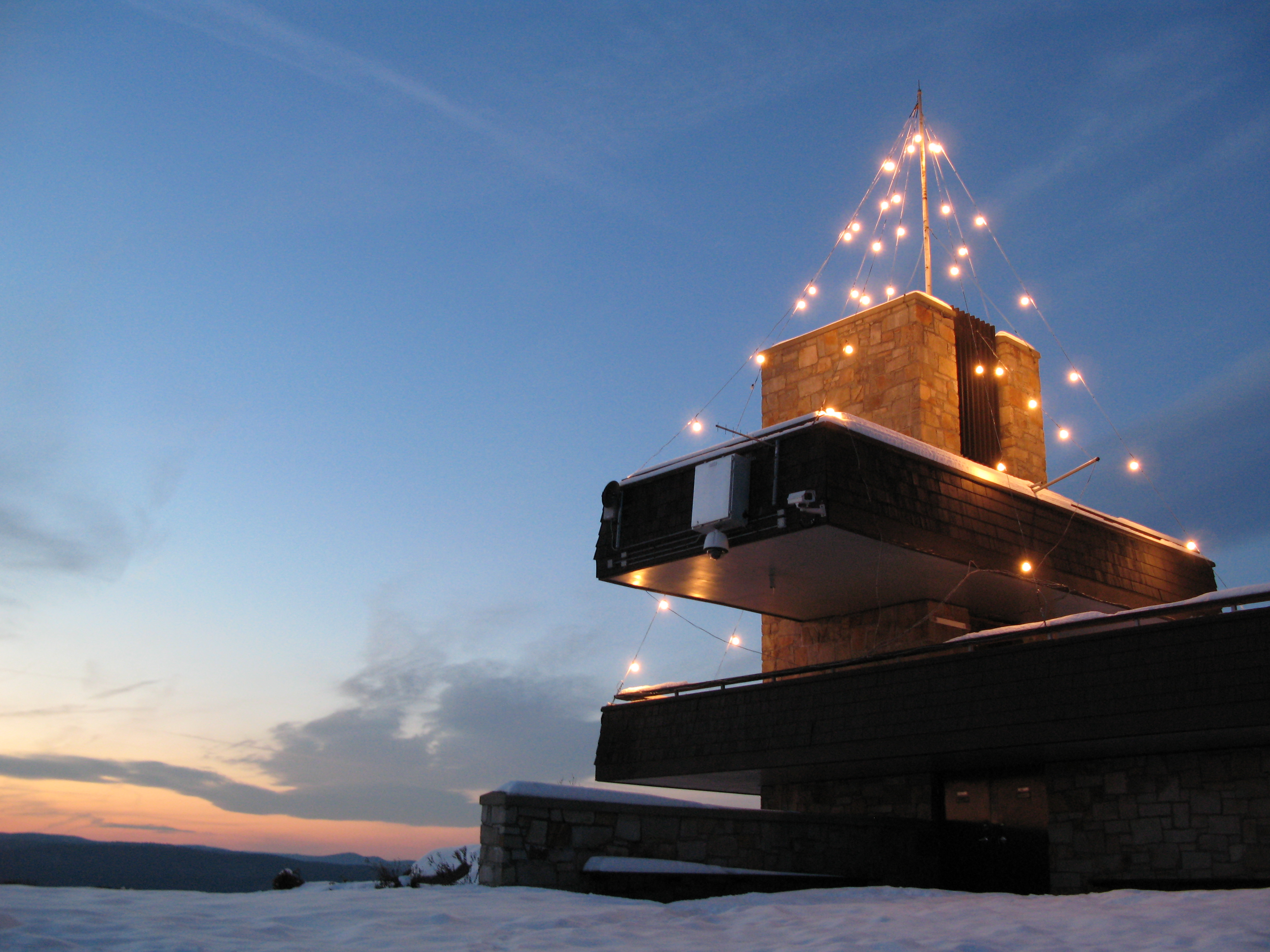
South Deerfield

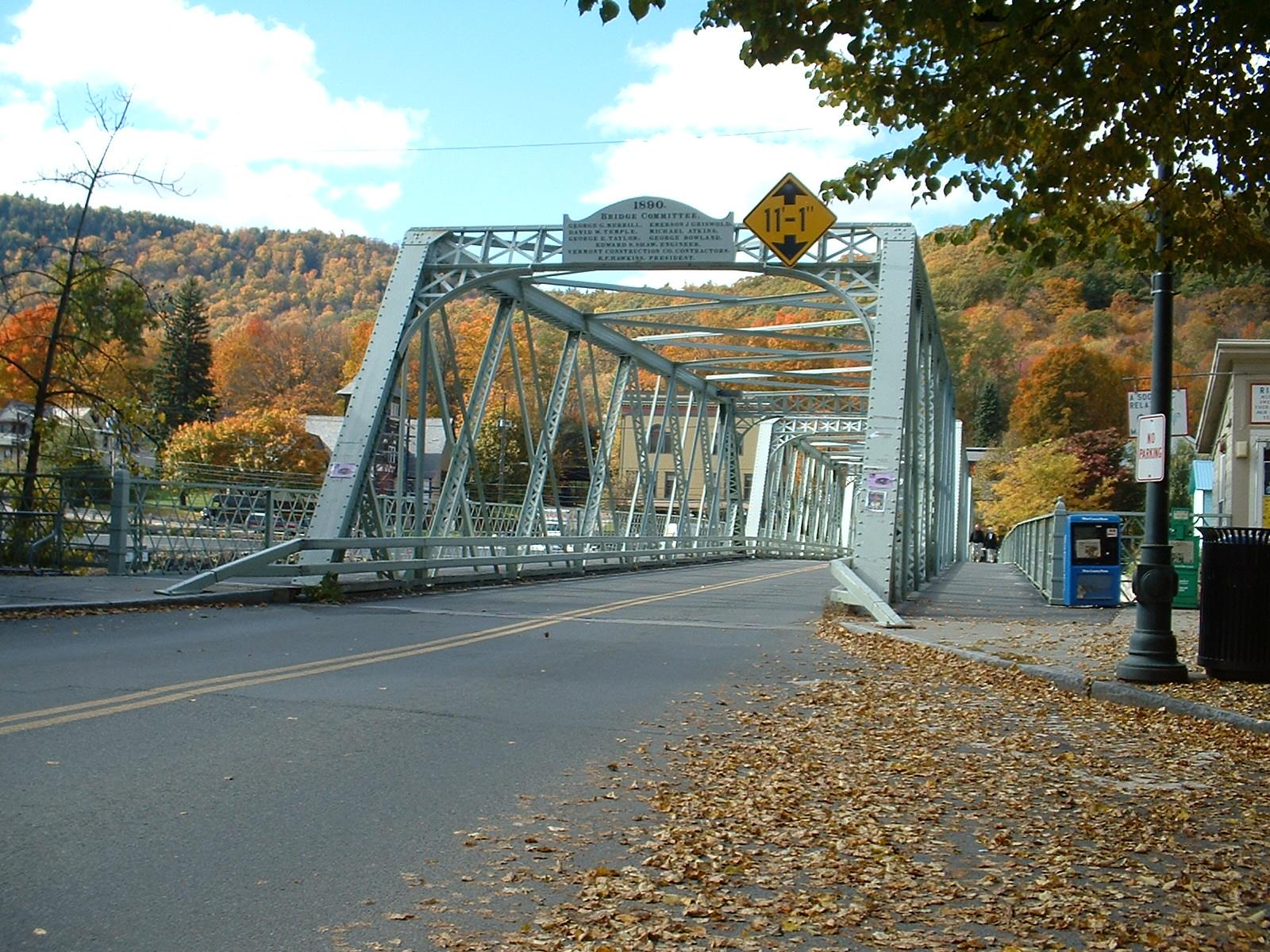
Shelburne Falls

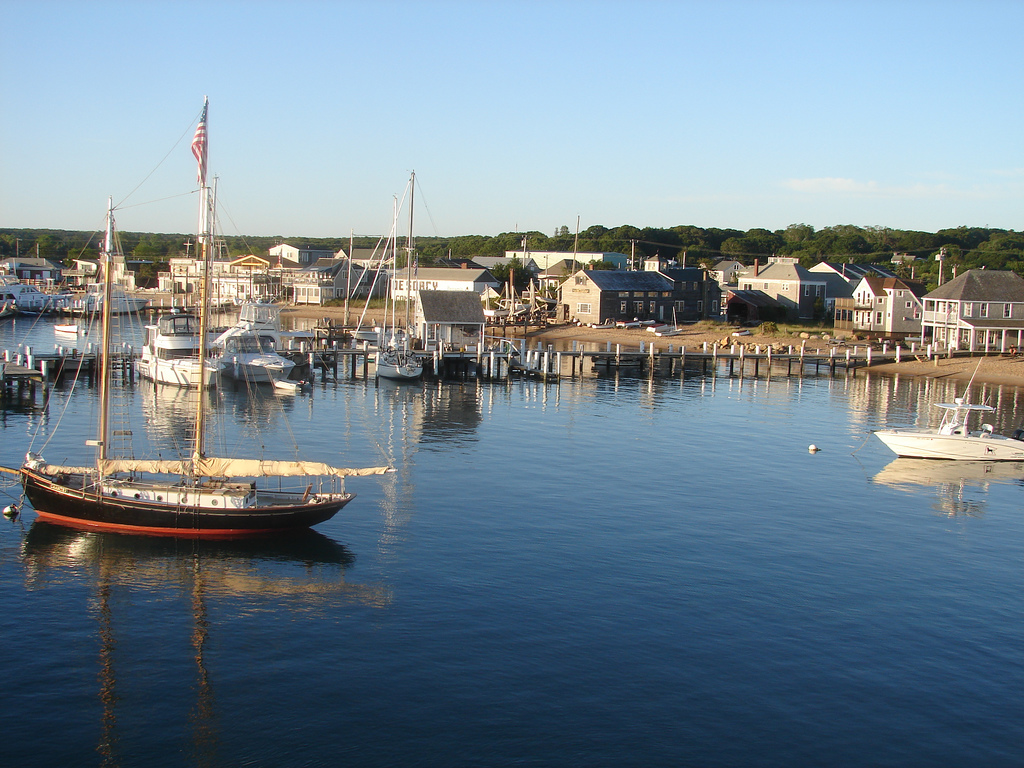
Vineyard Haven

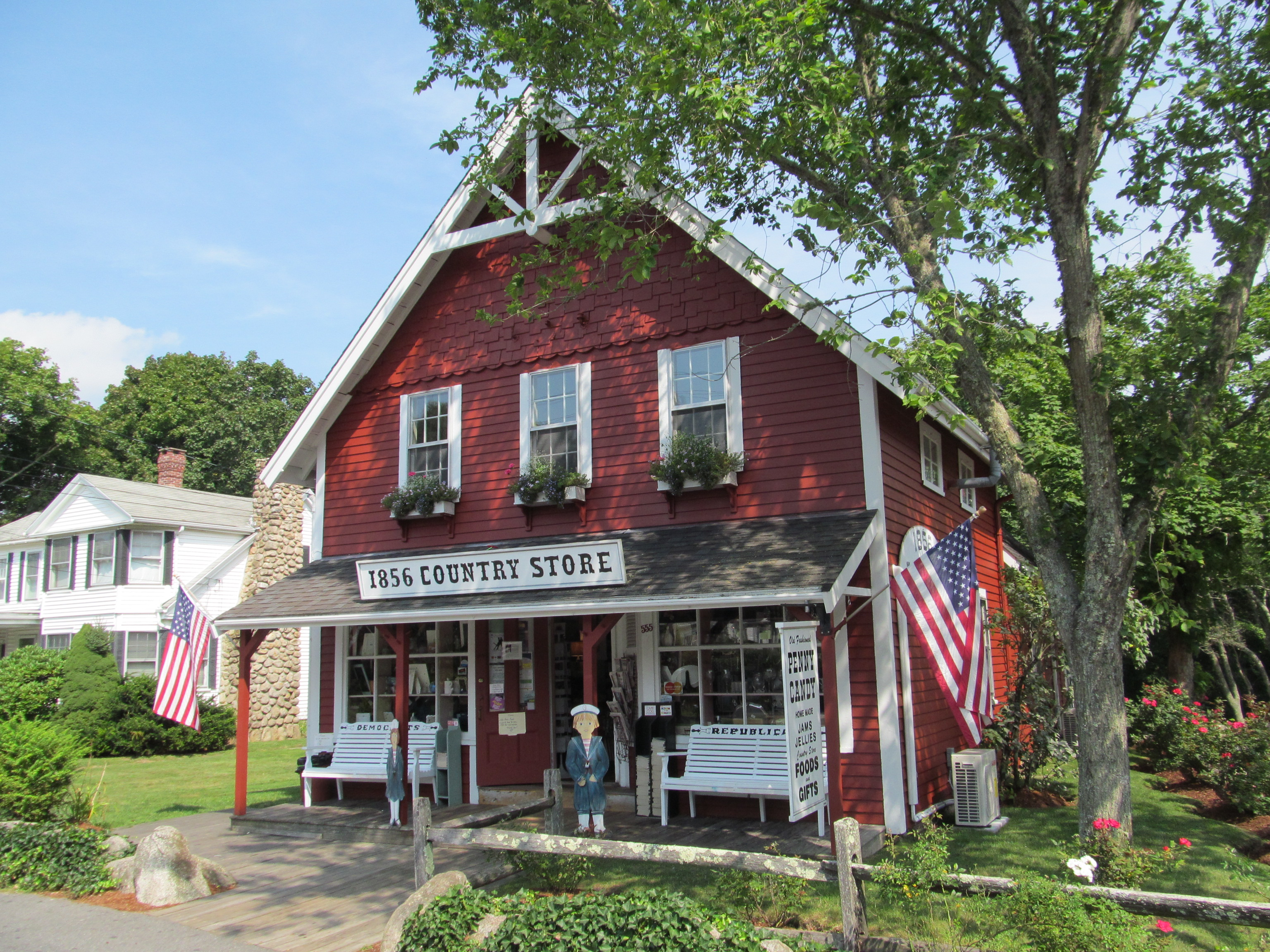
Centerville

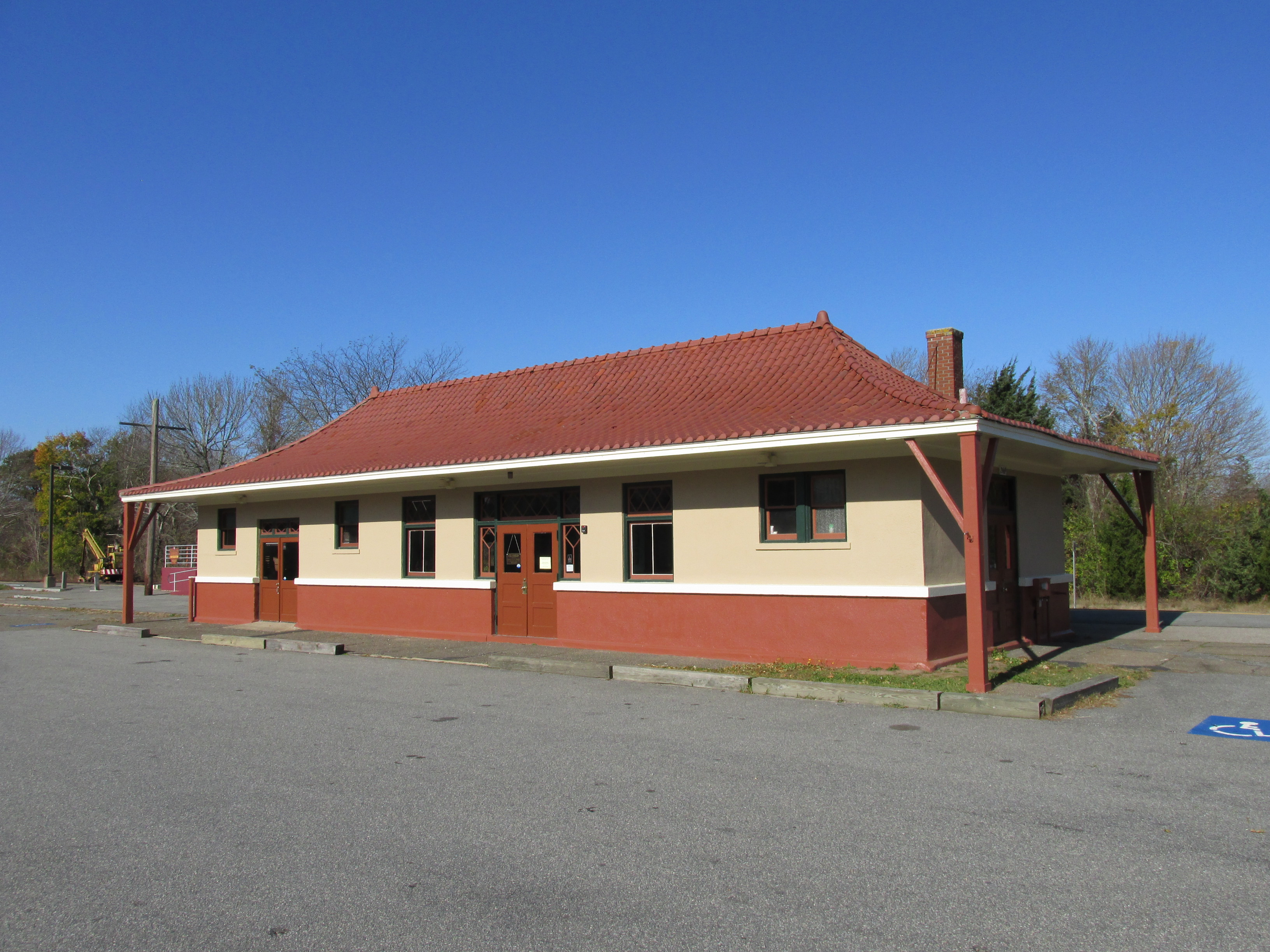
West Barnstable

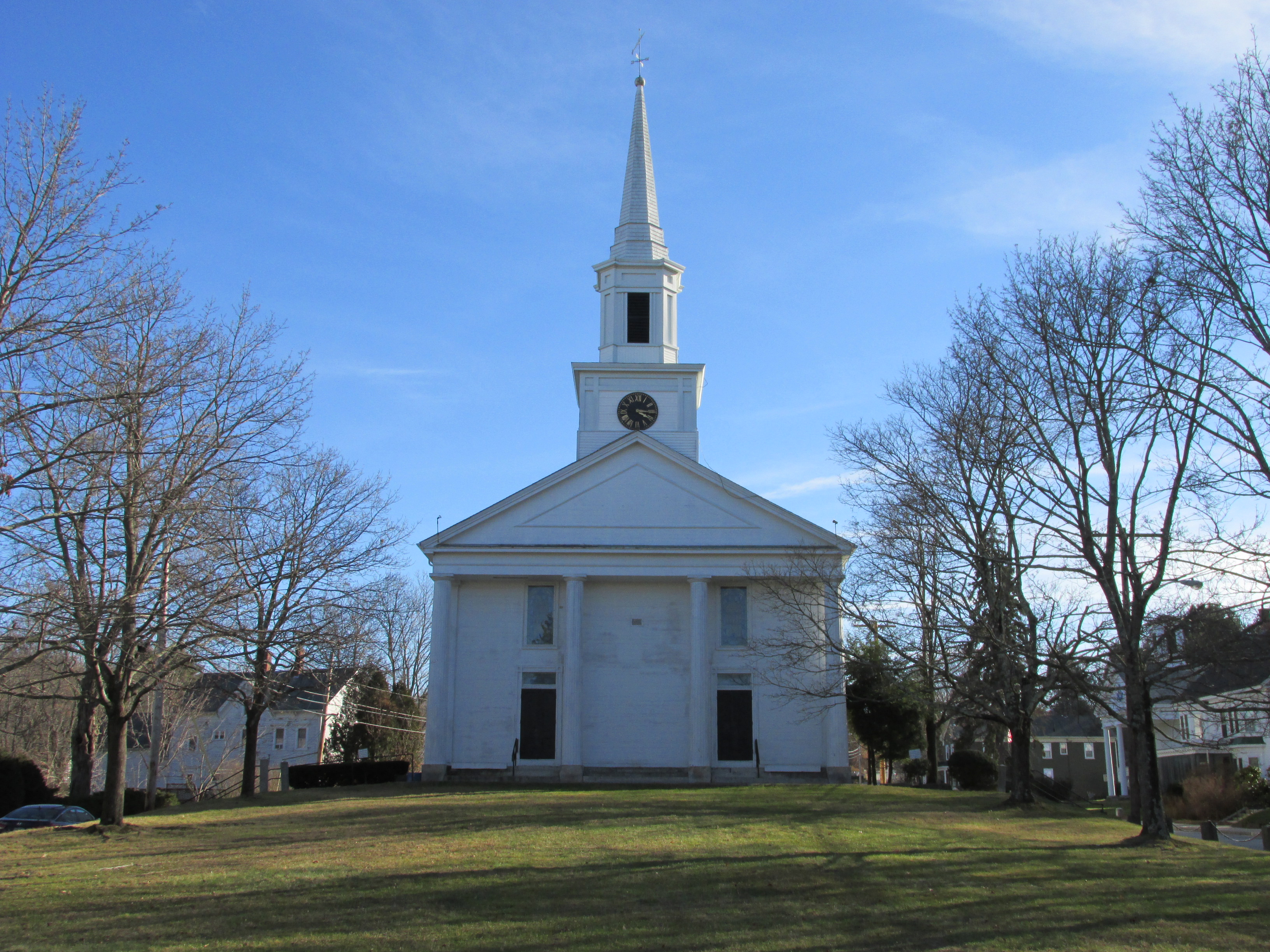
East Douglas

Village Name	Town/City	County
Acushnet Center	Acushnet	Bristol
Adamsdale	North Attleborough	Bristol
Amherst Center	Amherst	Hampshire
Annisquam	Gloucester	Essex
Assonet	Freetown	Bristol
Auburndale	Newton	Middlesex
Ayers Village	Haverhill	Essex
Baldwinville (Baldwinsville)	Templeton	Worcester
Barnstable	Barnstable	Barnstable
Berkshire	Lanesborough	Berkshire
Beverly Farms	Beverly	Essex
Bliss Corner	Dartmouth	Bristol
Bondsville	Palmer	Hampden
Braggville	Holliston	Middlesex
Braggville	Medway	Norfolk
Braggville	Milford	Worcester
Buzzards Bay	Bourne and Wareham	Barnstable
Cedar Crest	Marshfield	Plymouth
Centerville	Barnstable	Barnstable
Coltsville	Pittsfield	Berkshire
Chartley	Norton	Bristol
Chestnut Hill	Belchertown	Hampshire
Chestnut Hill	Blackstone	Worcester
Chestnut Hill	Boston	Suffolk
Chestnut Hill	Brookline	Norfolk
Chestnut Hill	Newton	Middlesex
Churchill	Holyoke	Hampden
Cordaville	Southborough	Worcester
Cotuit	Barnstable	Barnstable
Dennis Port (Dennisport)	Dennis	Barnstable
East Dennis	Dennis	Barnstable
East Douglas	Douglas	Worcester
East Falmouth	Falmouth	Barnstable
East Freetown	Freetown	Bristol
East Harwich	Harwich	Barnstable
East Sandwich	Sandwich	Barnstable
East Taunton	Taunton	Bristol
East Templeton	Templeton	Worcester
Elmwood	Holyoke	Hampden
The Flats	Holyoke	Hampden
Fiskdale (Fiskedale)	Sturbridge	Worcester
Florence	Northampton	Hampshire
Forestdale	Sandwich	Barnstable
Glendale	Stockbridge	Berkshire
Green Harbor	Duxbury	Plymouth
Green Harbor	Marshfield	Plymouth
Greenbush	Scituate	Plymouth
Greendale	Worcester	Worcester
Harwich Center	Harwich	Barnstable
Harwich Port	Harwich	Barnstable
Haydenville	Williamsburg	Hampshire
Highlands	Holyoke	Hampden
Highland Park	Holyoke	Hampden
Homestead Avenue	Holyoke	Hampden
Housatonic	Great Barrington	Berkshire
Humarock	Scituate	Plymouth
Hyannis	Barnstable	Barnstable
Indian Orchard	Springfield	Hampden
Ingleside	Holyoke	Hampden
Interlaken	Stockbridge	Berkshire
Jarvis Avenue	Holyoke	Hampden
Jefferson	Holden	Worcester
Leeds	Northampton	Hampshire
Mansfield Center	Mansfield	Bristol
Marion Center	Marion	Plymouth
Marshfield Hills	Marshfield	Plymouth
Marstons Mills	Barnstable	Barnstable
Mashpee Neck	Mashpee	Barnstable
Mattapoisett Center	Mattapoisett	Plymouth
Menemsha	Chilmark	Dukes
Metcalf	Holliston	Middlesex
Middleborough Center	Middleborough	Plymouth
Millers Falls	Montague	Franklin
Minot	Scituate	Plymouth
Monson Center	Monson	Hampden
Monument Beach	Bourne	Barnstable
Nagog Woods	Acton	Middlesex
New Seabury	Mashpee	Barnstable
Newton Centre	Newton	Middlesex
Newton Corner	Newton	Middlesex
Newton Highlands	Newton	Middlesex
Newton Lower Falls	Newton	Middlesex
Newton Upper Falls	Newton	Middlesex
Newtonville	Newton	Middlesex
Nonantum	Newton	Middlesex
North Amherst	Amherst	Hampshire
North Attleborough Center	North Attleborough	Bristol
North Billerica	Billerica	Middlesex
North Falmouth	Falmouth	Barnstable
North Harwich	Harwich	Barnstable
North Lakeville	Lakeville	Plymouth
North Pembroke	Pembroke	Plymouth
North Plymouth	Plymouth	Plymouth
North Scituate (formerly Gannett Corner)	Scituate	Plymouth
North Seekonk	Seekonk	Bristol
North Uxbridge	Uxbridge	Worcester
North Westport	Westport	Bristol
Norton Center	Norton	Bristol
Oakdale	West Boylston	Worcester
Oakdale	Holyoke	Hampden
Oak Hill	Newton	Middlesex
Ocean Grove	Swansea	Bristol
Onset	Wareham	Plymouth
Osterville	Barnstable	Barnstable
Otter River	Templeton	Worcester
Pleasant Lake	Harwich	Barnstable
Pocasset	Bourne	Barnstable
Popponesset	Mashpee	Barnstable
Prides Crossing	Beverly	Essex
Quinsigamond Village	Worcester	Worcester
Raynham Center	Raynham	Bristol
Rock Valley	Holyoke	Hampden
Sagamore	Bourne	Barnstable
Seabrook	Mashpee	Barnstable
Shelburne Falls	Shelburne and Buckland	Franklin
Smith's Ferry	Holyoke	Hampden
Smith Mills	Dartmouth	Bristol
South Acton	Acton	Middlesex
South Amherst	Amherst	Hampshire
South Ashburnham	Ashburnham	Worcester
South Attleboro	Attleboro	Bristol
South Deerfield	Deerfield	Franklin
South Dennis	Dennis	Barnstable
South Duxbury	Duxbury	Plymouth
South Holyoke	Holyoke	Hampden
South Lancaster	Lancaster	Worcester
South Harwich	Harwich	Barnstable
South Yarmouth	Yarmouth	Barnstable
Springdale	Holyoke	Hampden
Tatnuck	Worcester	Worcester
Teaticket	Falmouth	Barnstable
Templeton Center	Templeton	Worcester
Three Rivers	Palmer	Hampden
Thompsonville	Newton	Middlesex
Townsend Harbor	Townsend	Middlesex
Turners Falls	Montague	Franklin
Vernon Hill	Worcester	Worcester
Vineyard Haven	Tisbury	Dukes
Waban	Newton	Middlesex
Wareham Center	Wareham	Plymouth
West Barnstable	Barnstable	Barnstable
West Dennis	Dennis	Barnstable
West Falmouth	Falmouth	Barnstable
West Newton	Newton	Middlesex
West Wareham	Wareham	Plymouth
West Yarmouth	Yarmouth	Barnstable
West Harwich	Harwich	Barnstable
Weweantic	Wareham	Plymouth
White Island Shores	Plymouth	Plymouth
Whiting Farms	Holyoke	Hampden
Whitinsville	Northbridge	Worcester
Williamsville	Hubbardston	Worcester
Woods Hole	Falmouth	Barnstable
Wyben (formerly West Farms)	Westfield	Hampden
Yarmouth Port	Yarmouth	Barnstable

== Inactive ==
The following names are also currently or were formerly used to describe places in Massachusetts:

Named place	Municipality	County	Notes
Abbott Village	Andover	Essex	
Abel's Hill	Chilmark	Dukes	
Aberdeen	Boston	Suffolk	In Brighton
Academy Hill	Boston	Suffolk	
Acapesket	Falmouth	Barnstable	
Acre	Clinton	Worcester	
Acton Center	Acton	Middlesex	
Adamsville	Colrain	Franklin	
Agassiz	Cambridge	Middlesex	
Agawam Center	Agawam	Hampden	
Albee Corners	Charlton	Worcester	
Aldenville	Chicopee	Hampden	
Aldrich Lake	Granby	Hampden	aka Granby Hollow
Aldrich Village	Millbury	Worcester	
Alford Center	Alford	Berkshire	
Algeria	Otis	Berkshire	
Allen's Corner	Amesbury	Essex	
Allen's Corner	Walpole	Norfolk	
Allendale	Pittsfield	Berkshire	
Allenville	Woburn	Middlesex	
Allerton	Hull	Plymouth	
Allston	Boston	Suffolk	In Brighton
Allston Heights	Boston	Suffolk	In Brighton
Alpine Place	Franklin	Norfolk	
Amesbury Ferry	Amesbury	Essex	
Amherst Fields	Amherst	Hampshire	
Amherst Woods	Amherst	Hampshire	
Amory Hill	Springfield	Hampden	
Amostown	West Springfield	Hampden	
Anawan	Rehoboth	Bristol	
Andover North Parish	Andover	Essex	
Andover South Parish	Andover	Essex	
Andover Village	Andover	Essex	
Andover West Parish	Andover	Essex	
Andrew Square	Boston	Suffolk	in South Boston
Annasnappet	Carver	Plymouth	
Antassawamock	Mattapoisett	Plymouth	
Antassawamock Neck	Mattapoisett	Plymouth	
Apple Valley	Ashfield	Franklin	
Aquashenet	Mashpee	Barnstable	
Arlington District	Lawrence	Essex	
Arlington District	Methuen	Essex	
Arlington Heights	Arlington	Middlesex	
Arlington Heights	Methuen	Essex	
Arrowhead	Pittsfield	Berkshire	
Arsenal	Watertown	Middlesex	(See Watertown Arsenal)
Artichoke	Newburyport	Essex	
Asbury Grove	Hamilton	Essex	
Ashby Center	Ashby	Middlesex	
Ashcroft	Dedham	Norfolk	
Ashdod	Duxbury	Plymouth	
Ashfield Plain	Ashfield	Franklin	
Ashley Falls	Sheffield	Berkshire	
Ashleyville	West Springfield	Hampden	
Ashmont	Boston	Suffolk	part of Dorchester
Ashumet Park	Falmouth	Barnstable	
Ashumet Pond	Falmouth	Barnstable	
Aspinwall Hill	Brookline	Norfolk	
Assabet Park	Maynard	Middlesex	
Assinippi	Hanover & Norwell	Plymouth	Post Office in Hanover; also known as Snappy
Assonet Neck	Berkley	Bristol	
Hatherly	Scituate	Plymouth	
Athol Center	Athol	Worcester	
Atlantic	Salem	Essex	
Atlantic Hill	Hull	Plymouth	
Atlantic Station	Quincy	Norfolk	
Attitash	Amesbury	Essex	
Attleboro Falls	North Attleborough	Bristol	
Attleborough City	Attleboro	Bristol	
Auburn Center	Auburn	Worcester	
Auburn Station	Auburn	Worcester	
Auburnville	Whitman	Plymouth	
Aucoot	Mattapoisett	Plymouth	
Avon Hill	Cambridge	Middlesex	
Ayers City	Lowell	Middlesex	
Ayers Village	Haverhill	Essex	
Babbatasset	Pepperell	Middlesex	
Back Bay	Boston	Suffolk	
Baconsville	Shutesbury	Franklin	
Bailey	Andover	Essex	
Bailey's Hill	Saugus	Essex	
Baker Bridge Station	Lincoln	Middlesex	
Baker Hill	Malden	Middlesex	
Bakers Corner	Seekonk	Bristol	
Bakerville	Dartmouth	Bristol	
Bald Mountain	Bernardston	Franklin	
Baldpate Station	Georgetown	Essex	
Baldwin Hill	Egremont	Berkshire	
Ball Square	Somerville	Middlesex	
Ball's Corner	Acushnet	Bristol	
Ballard Hill	Lancaster	Worcester	
Ballardvale	Andover	Essex	
Bancroft	Becket	Berkshire	
Baptist Corner	Ashfield	Franklin	
Baptist Hill	Conway	Franklin	
Baptist Village	East Longmeadow	Hampden	
Barber Hill	Warwick	Franklin	
Barber's Station	Worcester	Worcester	
Barden Hill	Middleborough	Plymouth	
Bardwell	Belchertown	Hampshire	
Bardwell	Shelburne	Franklin	
Bardwell's Ferry	Deerfield	Franklin	train station & locality
Barecove	Hingham	Plymouth	
Barker Hill	Townsend	Middlesex	
Barkers	Plymouth	Plymouth	
Barkerville	Pittsfield	Berkshire	
Barley Neck	Orleans	Barnstable	
Barmardville	Worcester	Worcester	
Barney's Point	Wareham	Plymouth	
Barneyville	Swansea	Bristol	
Barrack Hill	Rutland	Worcester	
Barre Center	Barre	Worcester	
Barre Falls	Barre	Worcester	
Barre Four Corners	Barre	Worcester	
Barre Plains	Barre	Worcester	
Barrett's Junction	Belchertown	Hampshire	
Barrowsville	Norton	Bristol	
Barry's Corner	Boston	Suffolk	in Allston
Barry's Corner	Quincy	Norfolk	
Bartlett's Village	Oxford	Worcester	
Bartonville	Dalton	Berkshire	
Bass Point	Nahant	Essex	
Bass River	Yarmouth	Barnstable	
Bass Rocks	Gloucester	Essex	
Bate's Pond	Carver	Plymouth	
Batesville	Goshen	Hampshire	
Bath House Station	Revere	Suffolk	
Battery Station	Winthrop	Suffolk	
Bay State	Northampton	Hampshire	
Bay View	Boston	Suffolk	in South Boston
Bay View	Dartmouth	Bristol	
Bay View	Gloucester	Essex	
Bay Village	Boston	Suffolk	
Bayberry Hill	Townsend	Middlesex	
Baylies Corner	Charlton	Worcester	
Bayside Station	Hull	Plymouth	
Bayview	Dartmouth	Bristol	
Beach Bluff	Swampscott	Essex	
Beach Point	Truro	Barnstable	
Beachmont	Revere	Suffolk	
Beacon Hill	Boston	Suffolk	
Baldwin	Tewksbury	Middlesex	former station
Beacon Park	Webster	Worcester	former station
Beaconsfield	Brookline	Norfolk	
Bean Crossing	Rowley	Essex	
Bean Porridge Hill	Westminster	Worcester	
Bear Hill	Merrimac	Essex	
Bear Hole	Taunton	Bristol	
Bear Meadow	North Reading	Middlesex	
Bear Town	Lee	Berkshire	
Bearcroft	Attleboro	Bristol	former RR station
Bearfoot District	Charlton	Worcester	
Bearskin Neck	Rockport	Middlesex	
Beaulah Park	Randolph	Norfolk	
Beaver	East Bridgewater	Plymouth	
Beaver	North Adams	Berkshire	
Beaver Brook Station	Waltham	Middlesex	
Beaver Brown's Crossing	East Bridgewater	Plymouth	
Beaver Meadow	Leyden	Franklin	
Becket Center	Becket	Berkshire	
Bedford Springs	Bedford	Middlesex	
Beech Grove	Pittsfield	Berkshire	
Beech Hill	Blandford	Hampden	
Beech Plain	Sandisfield	Berkshire	
Beechdale	Williamstown	Berkshire	
Beechwood	Cohasset	Norfolk	
Beechwoods	Lakeville	Plymouth	
Bel Air	Pittsfield	Berkshire	
Belcher's Corner	Stoughton	Norfolk	
Belchertown Center	Belchertown	Hampshire	
Bell Rock Station	Malden	Middlesex	
Belle Grove	Dracut	Middlesex	
Belle Isle	Boston	Suffolk	
Belle Isle	Winthrop	Suffolk	former station
Belleview	Boston	Suffolk	
Belleview Park	Brockton	Plymouth	
Belleville	Newburyport	Essex	
Bellevue Station	Boston	Suffolk	
Bellingham	Chelsea	Suffolk	
Bellingham Center	Bellingham	Norfolk	
Bellingham Four Corners	Bellingham	Norfolk	
Bellingham Junction	Bellingham	Norfolk	
Belmont	Malden	Middlesex	
Belvidere	Lowell	Middlesex	
Bemis Station	Watertown	Middlesex	
Bennett Hall	Billerica	Middlesex	former RR station
Benton Hill	Becket	Berkshire	
Berkley Bridge	Berkley	Bristol	
Berkley Common	Berkley	Bristol	
Berkshire	Lanesborough	Berkshire	
Berkshire Heights	Great Barrington	Berkshire	
Berlin Station	Berlin	Worcester	
Berry's Corner	Charlton	Worcester	
Berrymans Four Corners	Westport	Bristol	
Bethlehem District	Otis	Berkshire	
Beverly Cove	Beverly	Essex	
Bigelow Hollow	North Brookfield	Worcester	
Billerica Center	Billerica	Middlesex	
Billingsgate	Wellfleet	Barnstable	
Billington Sea	Plymouth	Plymouth	
Birch Meadow	Merrimac	Essex	
Birchville	Huntington	Hampshire	
Bird Street Station	Boston	Suffolk	
Bird's Hill Station	Needham	Norfolk	
Bisbee	Chesterfield	Hampshire	
Bisbee's Corner	Rochester	Plymouth	
Black Rock	Cohasset	Norfolk	
Black Rock Station	Cohasset	Norfolk	
Blackburn Village	Ashburnham	Worcester	
Blackinton	North Adams and Williamstown	Berkshire	a locality on the town line
Blackstone Village	Blackstone	Worcester	
Blackwater	Kingston	Plymouth	
Blanchardville	Palmer	Hampden	
Blandford Center	Blandford	Hampden	
Blaneyville	North Attleborough	Bristol	
Bleachery	Peabody	Essex	
Bleachery	Somerville	Middlesex	
Bleachery Station	Lowell	Middlesex	
Bleachery Station	Waltham	Middlesex	
Bliss Corner	Colrain	Franklin	
Blissville	Orange	Franklin	
Blithewood	Worcester	Worcester	
Bloomingdale	Worcester	Worcester	
Blubber Hollow	Salem	Essex	
Blue Hill	Milton	Norfolk	
Blue Meadow	Belchertown	Hampshire	
Bobtown	Pittsfield	Berkshire	
Bofat Hill	Chesterfield	Hampshire	
Bogue	Barre	Worcester	
Bolton Center	Bolton	Worcester	
Bolton Station	Bolton	Worcester	
Bonney Ridge Four Corners	Chester	Hampden	
Bonny Rig	Becket	Berkshire	
Border City	Fall River	Bristol	
Bourndale	Bourne	Barnstable	P.O.
Bowen’s Corner	Adams	Berkshire	
Bowenville	Fall River	Bristol	
Bowkerville	Saugus	Essex	
Bowlder Grange	Becket	Berkshire	
Box Factory	Middleton	Essex	
Boxboro Station	Boxborough	Middlesex	former RR station
Boxford First Parish	Boxford	Essex	
Boxford Second Parish	Boxford	Essex	
Boxford Village	Boxford	Essex	
Boylston	Boston	Suffolk	
Boylston Center	Boylston	Worcester	
Boylston Common	West Boylston	Worcester	
Bozrah	Hawley	Franklin	
Bradford	Haverhill	Essex	
Bradley Station	Worcester	Worcester	former station
Bradstreet	Hatfield	Hampshire	P.O.
Bragg Hill	Westminster	Worcester	
Braintree Highlands	Braintree	Norfolk	formerly Monatiquot Highlands
Braley's Station	Freetown	Bristol	former RR station
Bramanville	Millbury	Worcester	
Brandon	Dudley	Worcester	
Brandon	Webster	Worcester	
Brant Rock	Marshfield	Plymouth	P.O. locality
Brattle Station	Arlington	Middlesex	
Brayton Point	Somerset	Bristol	
Braytonville	North Adams	Berkshire	Former Factory Village
Brennon's Hill	Lanesborough	Berkshire	
Brewster Station	Brewster	Barnstable	
Brick City	Leicester	Worcester	
Brickbottom	Somerville	Middlesex	
Brickett Hill	Haverhill	Essex	
Bridgewater Iron Works	Bridgewater	Plymouth	
Bridgewater Junction	Bridgewater	Plymouth	
Brier	Savoy	Berkshire	
Brier Hill	Ashfield	Franklin	
Briggs Corner	Attleboro	Bristol	
Briggsville	Clarksburg	Berkshire	
Brightside	Holyoke	Hampden	
Brightwood	Springfield	Hampden	P.O. & locality
Brimestone Hill	Ware	Hampshire	
Brimfield Center	Brimfield	Hampden	
Britannia	Taunton	Bristol	
Broad Cove	Dighton	Bristol	
Broad Cove	Hingham	Plymouth	
Broadway Station	Malden	Middlesex	
Brockton Heights	Brockton	Plymouth	
Brookline Hills	Brookline	Norfolk	
Brookline Village	Brookline	Norfolk	
Brooks Station	Princeton	Worcester	
Brooks Village	Templeton	Worcester	
Brookside	Charlton	Worcester	
Brookside	Dracut	Middlesex	
Brookside	Dracut	Middlesex	
Brookside	Great Barrington	Berkshire	
Brookside	Southbridge	Worcester	
Brookside Station	Westford	Middlesex	
Brookville	Fall River	Bristol	
Brookville	Holbrook	Norfolk	
Broomshire	Conway	Franklin	
Brown	Wilmington	Middlesex	former station
Browns Station	East Bridgewater	Plymouth	
Brush Hill	Milton	Norfolk	
Brush Valley	Warwick	Franklin	
Bryantville	Holden	Worcester	
Bryantville	Pembroke	Plymouth	P.O. & locality on Hanson line
Buckland Center	Buckland	Franklin	
Buckland Four Corners	Buckland	Franklin	
Bucks Village	Millbury	Worcester	
Buffum's	Charlton	Worcester	
Buffum's Corner	Salem	Essex	
Buffville	Oxford	Worcester	
Bull's Eye Crossing	Middleborough	Plymouth	
Bullardville	Winchendon	Worcester	
Bumpus Corner	Brockton	Plymouth	
Burdickville	North Adams	Berkshire	
Burditt Hill	Clinton	Worcester	
Burke Flat	Bernardston	Franklin	
Burke's Corner	Rowley	Essex	
Burkinshaw	Pepperell	Middlesex	
Burkville	Conway	Franklin	
Burleigh	Palmer	Hampden	
Burnt Hill	Heath	Franklin	
Burnt Swamp Corner	Plainville	Norfolk	
Burrage	Holbrook	Norfolk	
Burrage Station	Hanson	Plymouth	
Burrageville	Ashburnham	Worcester	
Burt’s Corner	Berkley	Bristol	
Burtt's Crossing	Tewksbury	Middlesex	R.R. station
Bush	Brockton	Plymouth	
Bush Corner	Middleton	Essex	
Bush Factory	Norfolk	Norfolk	
Butlerville	Wilbraham	Hampden	
Buxton	Williamstown	Berkshire	
Byfield	Newbury	Essex	
Byfield Parish	Georgetown	Essex	
Cadman's Neck	Westport	Bristol	
Calf Pasture	Boston	Suffolk	in Dorchester
California	Clinton	Worcester	
Calumet	Uxbridge	Worcester	
Cambridge Highlands	Cambridge	Middlesex	
Cambridge Street	Worcester	Worcester	former station
Cambridgeport	Cambridge	Middlesex	
Camp Devens	Ayer	Middlesex	aka Fort Devens
Camp Hebron	Attleboro	Bristol	
Camp Merrill	Pittsfield	Berkshire	P.O.
Camp Station	Yarmouth	former RR station	
Campello	Brockton	Plymouth	
Canada	Sunderland	Franklin	
Canaumet	Bourne	Barnstable	
Candlewood	Ipswich	Essex	
Cannonville	Mattapoisett	Plymouth	
Cannonville	New Bedford	Bristol	
Canobieola	Methuen	Essex	
Canterbury	Boston	Suffolk	in Dorchester
Canton Center	Canton	Norfolk	
Canton Corner	Canton	Norfolk	
Canton Farms	Canton	Norfolk	
Canton Junction	Canton	Norfolk	
Cape Poge	Edgartown	Duke	
Caper Corner	Townsend	Middlesex	
Capron	Attleboro	Bristol	
Captain's Hill	Duxbury	Plymouth	
Card's Corner	Williamstown	Berkshire	
Carey's Crossing	Ashburnham	Worcester	former RR station
Caryville	Bellingham	Norfolk	
Carlisle Station	Carlisle	Middlesex	
Carltonville	Lawrence	Essex	
Carltonville Station	Salem	Essex	
Carsonville	Dalton	Berkshire	
Carters Station	Berlin	Worcester	former RR station
Cary Hill	Brockton	Plymouth	
Caryville	Bellingham	Norfolk	near Bellingham line
Cashman's Crossing	Ashburnham	Worcester	former station
Castle Hill Station	Salem	Essex	
Castle Island	Boston	Suffolk	Once an island, now part of South Boston
Castle Park	Nahant	Essex	
Catamount Hill	Colrain	Franklin	
Catville	Hubbardston	Worcester	
Cedar Grove	Boston	Suffolk	former station in Dorchester
Cedar Station	Walpole	Norfolk	former station
Cedarville	Plymouth	Plymouth	
Centennial Grove Station	Hamilton	Essex	
Center Abington	Abington	Plymouth	
Center Street	Brockton	Plymouth	P.O.
Center Village	Wareham	Plymouth	
Centerville	Beverly	Essex	
Centerville	Douglas	Worcester	
Centerville	Douglas	Worcester	
Centerville	Grafton	Worcester	
Centerville	Uxbridge	Worcester	
Centerville	Winchendon	Worcester	
Central Avenue	Boston	Suffolk	former station in Dorchester
Central District	Boston	Suffolk	
Central Hill	Somerville	Middlesex	
Central Square	Cambridge	Middlesex	
Central Square Station	Woburn	Middlesex	
Central Village	Blackstone	Worcester	
Central Village	Seekonk	Bristol	
Central Village	West Boylston	Worcester	
Central Village	Westport	Bristol	
Centralville	Lowell	Middlesex	
Centre	Andover	Essex	
Centreville	Beverly	Essex	
Centreville	Brockton	Plymouth	
Chace's	Freetown	Bristol	
Chaces Station	Taunton	Bristol	
Chaffee	Oxford	Worcester	
Chaffinville	Holden	Worcester	
Chamberlain's Corner	Westford	Middlesex	
Chandler	Andover	Essex	
Chandler Hill	Colrain	Franklin	
Chapaquoit	Falmouth	Barnstable	
Chappaquiddick Island (Chappequiddick Island)	Edgartown	Dukes	
Chapinsville	Lawrence	Essex	
Chapinville	Northborough	Worcester	
Chaplinville	Rowley	Essex	
Charcoal City	Becket	Berkshire	
Charityville	Williamstown	Berkshire	
Charles River	Needham	Norfolk	P.O.
Charles River Heights	Dedham	Norfolk	
Charles River Village	Needham	Norfolk	near Dover line
Charlton Center	Charlton	Worcester	
Charlton City	Charlton	Worcester	
Charlton Depot	Charlton	Worcester	
Chartley	Norton	Bristol	
Chase's	Taunton	Bristol	
Chase's Village	Oxford	Worcester	
Chaseville	Dudley	Worcester	
Chaseville	Webster	Worcester	
Chatham Port	Chatham	Barnstable	
Chattanooga	Ashland	Middlesex	
Cheapside	Deerfield	Franklin	
Cheapside	Greenfield	Franklin	
Chebacco Pond	Essex	Essex	
Cheever	West Stockbridge	Berkshire	
Chelmsford Center	Chelmsford	Middlesex	
Chemistry	Waltham	Middlesex	
Cherry Brook Station	Weston	Middlesex	
Cherry Valley	Leicester	Worcester	
Cherry Valley	Ludlow	Hampshire	former locality name now Reservoir Section
Cheshire Corner	Cheshire	Berkshire	
Cheshire Harbor	Adams & Cheshire	Berkshire	on the town line
Cheshire Village	Cheshire	Berkshire	
Chester Center	Chester	Hampden	
Chester Village	Chester	Hampden	
Chesterfield Center	Chesterfield	Hampshire	
Chickemoo	Chilmark	Dukes	
Chicopee Center	Chicopee	Hampden	
Chicopee Falls	Chicopee	Hampden	
Chicopee Junction	Chicopee	Hampden	
Chiltonville	Plymouth	Plymouth	
China Town	Boston	Suffolk	
Chinquist	Mashpee	Barnstable	
Chocksett	Sterling	Worcester	
Christian Hill	Barre	Worcester	
Christian Hill	Colrain	Franklin	
Cinder Hill	East Bridgewater	Plymouth	
City Center	Attleboro	Bristol	
City Hall	Lawrence	Essex P.O.	
City Line	West Boylston	Worcester	
City Line	Auburn	Worcester	
City Mills	Norfolk	Norfolk	
City Point	Boston	Suffolk	in South Boston
Clafinville	Hopkinton	Middlesex	
Clarendon Hills	Boston	Suffolk	in Hyde Park
Clarendon Hills	Somerville	Middlesex	
Clark Point	New Bedford	Bristol	
Clayton	New Marlborough	Berkshire	
Clear River	Douglas	Worcester	
Clematis Brook Station	Waltham	Middlesex	
Cleveland Circle	Boston	Suffolk	in Brighton
Clevelandtown	Edgartown	Dukes	
Clicquot Station	Millis	Norfolk	
Clifford	Freetown	Bristol	
Clifford	New Bedford	Bristol	P.O.
Clifton	Marblehead	Essex	
Clifton Heights	Brockton	Plymouth	
Cliftondale	Saugus	Essex	
Coatue	Nantucket	Nantucket	
Cobb's Tavern	Stoughton	Norfolk	
Cobbetts Corners	Saugus	Essex	
Coburnville	Framingham	Middlesex	
Coburnville	Lynnfield	Essex	
Cochesett	West Bridgewater	Plymouth	
Cochituate	Wayland	Middlesex	
Codman Square	Boston	Suffolk	in Dorchester
Cohasset Cove	Cohasset	Norfolk	
Cold Hill	Granby	Hampshire	
Cold Spring	Otis	Berkshire	
Coldbrook	Barre	Worcester	
Coldbrook	Oakham	Worcester	
Coldbrook Springs	Oakham	Worcester	
Coldspring	Westwood	Norfolk	
Cole Hill	Granby	Hampshire	
Coles Station	Swansea	Bristol	former name; now Touisset
Colesville	Williamstown	Berkshire	
College Hill	Medford	Middlesex	
College Hill	Worcester	Worcester	
Collidgeville	Hudson	Middlesex	
Collins Station	Ludlow	Hampden	former name; now Miller Street
Collins Street Station	Danvers	Middlesex	
Collinsville	Dracut	Middlesex	P.O.
Colrain Center	Colrain	Franklin	
Columbus Park	Worcester	Worcester	
Comins Village	Oxford	Worcester	
Commercial Point	Boston	Suffolk	
Commercial Street	Brockton	Plymouth	
Concord Junction	Concord	Middlesex	
Congamuck	Southwick	Hampden	
Connecticut Corner	Dedham	Norfolk	
Conomo	Essex	Essex	former RR station
Conomo Point	Essex	Essex	
Cookshire	Sterling	Worcester	
Cooleyville	New Salem	Franklin	
Coolidge Corner	Brookline	Norfolk	
Coolidge Hill	Cambridge	Middlesex	
Copecut	Fall River	Bristol	
Copicut	Fall River	Bristol	
Coppville	Charlton	Worcester	
Cordage	Plymouth	Plymouth	formerly Seaside
Corey Hill	Brookline	Norfolk	
Corn Hill	Truro	Barnstable	
Cotley	Taunton	Bristol	
Cottage Farm	Brookline	Norfolk	
Cottage Farm Station	Boston	Suffolk	former station
Coulomb Manor	Acushnet	Bristol	
Cove Landing	Hudson	Middlesex	P.O.
Cove Village	Beverly	Essex	
Cove Village	Dartmouth	Bristol	
Craigville	Barnstable	Barnstable	
Cranes Norton	Bristol	former station	
Craneville	Dalton	Berkshire	
Creamery Station	Hardwick	Worcester	
Crescent Avenue Station	Boston	Suffolk	former station
Crescent Beach	Mattapoisett	Plymouth	
Crescent Beach	Revere	Suffolk	
Crescent Mills	Russell	Hampden	
Crickett Hill	Conway	Franklin	
Crimpville	Bellingham	Norfolk	
Crockertown	Pembroke	Plymouth	
Crockerville	Fitchburg	Worcester	
Crook’s Corner	Bellingham	Norfolk	
Cross Street Station	Winchester	Middlesex	
Crow Hill	Easthampton	Hampshire	
Crow Point	Hingham	Plymouth	
Crow Village	Peabody	Essex	
Crowleyville	Chicopee	Hampden	
Crystal Lake	Gardner	Worcester	
Crystal Springs Station	Freetown	Bristol	
Cummaquid	Barnstable	Barnstable	
Cummingsville	Woburn	Middlesex	
Cumston Village	Burlington	Middlesex	
Curtis Crossing Station	Hanover	Plymouth	
Curtisville	East Bridgewater	Plymouth	
Curtisville	Stockbridge	Berkshire	former name, now Interlaken
Cushing	Salisbury	Essex	P.O.
Cutter Village	Winchester	Middlesex	
Cuttyhunk	Gosnold	Dukes	P.O.
Cyrus	Heath	Franklin	
Daltonville	Newburyport	Essex	
Danielsville	Rowley	Essex	
Danvers Centre	Danvers	Essex	also known as Salem Village
Danvers Highlands	Danvers	Essex	
Danvers Plains	Danvers	Essex	
Danversport	Danvers	Essex	also known as Newmills also known as Neck of Land
Darby	Plymouth	Plymouth	
Davis	Rowe	Hampshire	
Davis Corner	Foxborough	Norfolk	
Davisville	Falmouth	Barnstable	
Dawson Station	Holden	Worcester	
Dayville	Chester	Hampden	
Deantown	Attleboro	Bristol	
Deanville	Norfolk	Norfolk	
Dedham Island	Dedham	Norfolk	
Dedham Road Station	Canton	Norfolk	near Norwood line
Deer Island	Boston	Suffolk	P.O.
Deerfield Center	Deerfield	Franklin	
Deershorn	Lancaster	Worcester	
Dell	Heath	Franklin	
Dennison District	Southbridge	Worcester	
Dennisport	Dennis	Barnstable	
Dennyville	Barre	Worcester	
Depot Hill	Holyoke	Hampden	
Depot Village	West Boylston	Worcester	
Devens	Ayer	Middlesex	
Devereux	Marblehead	Essex	
Dighton Rock Park	Dighton	Bristol	
Doane	Hawley	Franklin	
Dodge	Charlton	Worcester	P.O.
Dodgeville	Attleboro	Bristol	
Dog Corner	Stoughton	Norfolk	
Dogtown	Wellfleet	Barnstable	
Dogtown Commons	Rockport and Gloucester	Essex	on town line
Dole Corner	Rowley	Essex	
Donkeyville	Foxborough	Norfolk	former name; now Lakeview
Dorchester Heights	Boston	Suffolk	now South Boston
Dorchester Lower Mills	Boston	Suffolk	
Douglas Center	Douglas	Worcester	
Douglas Park	Brockton	Plymouth	
Douglas Station	Douglas	Worcester	
Dover Center	Dover	Norfolk	
Dowse's Corner	Sherborn	Middlesex	
Dracut Center	Dracut	Middlesex	
Dresser Hill	Charlton	Worcester	
Drinkwater	Hanover	Plymouth	
Drury	Florida	Berkshire	P.O.
Drury	Florida	Berkshire	
Drury Square	Auburn	Worcester	
Dry Pond	Stoughton	Norfolk	
Dublin	Bridgewater	Plymouth	
Dublin	Peabody	Essex	former name, now East End
Duck Harbor	Clinton	Worcester	
Duckville	Palmer	Hampden	
Dudley Center	Dudley	Worcester	
Dudley Hill	Dudley	Worcester	
Dudley Square	Boston	Suffolk	
Dudleyville	Leverett	Franklin	
Durenville	Woburn	Middlesex	
Duxbury Beach	Duxbury	Plymouth	
Dwight	Belchertown	Hampshire	
Eagleville	Athol	Worcester	
East Acton	Acton	Middlesex	
East Alford	Alford	Berkshire	
East Amherst	Amherst	Hampshire	
East Arlington	Arlington	Middlesex	
East Attleboro	Attleboro	Bristol	
East Barre	Barre	Worcester	
East Becket	Becket	Berkshire	
East Berlin	Berlin	Worcester	
East Bernardston	Bernardston	Franklin	
East Billerica	Billerica	Middlesex	
East Blackstone	Bellingham	Norfolk	former RR station
East Blackstone	Blackstone	Worcester	
East Boston	Boston	Suffolk	
East Boxford	Boxford	Essex	
East Braintree	Braintree	Norfolk	
East Brewster	Brewster	Barnstable	
East Brimfield	Brimfield	Hampden	
East Buckland	Buckland	Franklin	
East Cambridge	Cambridge	Middlesex	
East Carver	Carver & part of Plymouth	Plymouth	
East Charlemont	Charlemont	Franklin	
East Chelmsford	Chelmsford	Middlesex	
East Cheshire	Cheshire	Berkshire	
East Chop	Oak Bluffs	Dukes	
East Colrain	Colrain	Franklin	
East Danvers	Danvers	Essex	
East Dedham	Dedham	Norfolk	
East Deerfield	Deerfield	Franklin	
East Dracut	Dracut	Middlesex	
East End	Bolton	Worcester	
East End	Peabody	Essex	formerly Dublin
East End	Provincetown	Barnstable	
East Everett	Everett	Middlesex	
East Fairhaven	Fairhaven	Bristol	
East Farms	Westfield	Hampden	
East Fitchburg	Fitchburg	Worcester	
East Foxborough	Foxborough	Norfolk	
East Gardner	Gardner	Worcester	
East Hill	Belchertown	Hampshire	
East Junction	Attleboro	Bristol	
East Junction	Seekonk	Bristol	
East Lexington	Lexington	Middlesex	
East Parish	Haverhill	Essex	
East Quarter	Concord	Middlesex	
East Section	Boylston	Worcester	
East Side	Melrose	Middlesex	
East Village	Webster	Worcester	
East Wilbraham	Wilbraham	Hampden	formerly Ellis Mills
Eastham Center	Eastham	Barnstable	
Easton Center	Easton	Bristol	
Easton Furnace	Easton	Bristol	
Eastondale	Easton	Bristol	
Eastside	Uxbridge	Worcester	
Eastville	Bridgewater	Plymouth	
Eastville	East Bridgewater	Plymouth	
Eastville	Oak Bluffs	Dukes	
Echo Hill	Amherst	Hampshire	
Eddyville	Middleborough	Plymouth	
Edgeworth	Malden	Middlesex	
Egleston Square	Boston	Suffolk	Part of Roxbury
Egremont Plain	Egremont	Berkshire	
Egypt	Scituate	Plymouth	
Elesmere	Dracut	Middlesex	
Eliot	Newton	Middlesex	former RR station
Elizabeth Island	Chilmark	Dukes	
Ellis	Westwood and Norwood	Norfolk	near town line
Ellis Furnace	Carver	Plymouth	
Ellis Mills	Monson	Hampden	
Ellis Mills	Wilbraham	Hampden	former name, now East Wilbraham
Ellis Park	Brockton	Plymouth	
Ellis Station	Dedham	Norfolk	
Ellisville	Plymouth	Plymouth	
Elm Grove	Colrain	Franklin	
Elmdale	Uxbridge	Worcester	
Elmhurst	Brockton	Plymouth	
Elmville	West Bridgewater	Plymouth	
Elmwood	Dedham	Norfolk	
Elmwood	East Bridgewater	Plymouth	P.O.
Endicott	Dedham	Norfolk	former RR station, formerly Elmwood
Essex Falls	Essex	Essex	
Eveningside	Pittsfield	Berkshire	
Everettville	Princeton	Worcester	
Ewingville	Holyoke	Hampden	
Factory Hollow	Amherst	Hampshire	
Factory Village	Ashburnham	Worcester	
Factory Village	Brockton	Plymouth	
Factory Village	Easthampton	Hampshire	
Factory Village	Greenfield	Franklin	
Factory Village	Middlefield	Hampshire	
Factory Village	Westport	Bristol	
Fairbank's Park	Dedham	Norfolk	
Fairfield	Russell	Hampden	
Fairlawn	Shrewsbury	Worcester	P.O.
Fairlawn	Tewksbury	Middlesex	
Fairmount	Boston	Suffolk	in Hyde Park
Fairmount	Worcester	Worcester	
Fairview	Athol	Worcester	P.O. & locality
Fairview	Chicopee	Hampden	
Fall Brook	Middleborough	Plymouth	
Falls	South Hadley	Hampshire	
Falls Village	North Attleborough	Bristol	
Falls Woods	South Hadley	Hampshire	
Falmouth Heights	Falmouth	Barnstable	
Falmouth Village	Falmouth	Barnstable	
Faneuil Hall	Boston	Suffolk	
Farley Village	Erving	Franklin	
Farm Bridge	Milford	Worcester	
Farm Hill Station	Stoneham	Middlesex	
Farm Street Station	Dover	Norfolk	
Farmer’s	Attleboro	Bristol	
Farmersville	Sandwich	Barnstable	
Farnams	Cheshire	Berkshire	
Farnum’s Gate	Blackstone	Worcester	
Farnumsville	Grafton	Worcester	
Faulkner	Malden	Middlesex	
Faunce Corner	Dartmouth	Bristol	
Fayville	Southborough	Worcester	
Federal	Belchertown	Hampshire	
Federal Hill	Dedham	Norfolk	
Felchville	Natick	Middlesex	
Felix Neck	Edgartown	Dukes	
Fells	Malden	Middlesex	former station
Fenno's Corner	Revere	Suffolk	
Fentonville	Brimfield	Hampden	
Fenway	Boston	Suffolk	
Ferncroft	Danvers	Essex	
Ferncroft Station	Danvers	Essex	formerly Beaver Brook
Fernwood	Gloucester	Essex	
Ferry Hill	Marshfield	Plymouth	
Ferry Street	Fall River	Bristol	former RR station
Fiberloid	Springfield	Hampden	
Fiddler's Green	Bolton	Worcester	
Fields Corner	Boston	Suffolk	in Dorchester
Fieldston	Marshfield	Plymouth	
Financial District	Boston	Suffolk	
Findlen	Dedham	Norfolk	P.O.
First Cliff	Scituate	Plymouth	
First Parish	Boxford	Essex	also known as East Parish
Fisher Hill	Brookline	Norfolk	
Fisherville	Attleboro	Bristol	
Fisherville	Grafton	Worcester	
Five Corners	Blackstone	Worcester	
Five Corners	Braintree	Norfolk	
Five Corners	Granby	Hampshire	
Five Paths	Wayland	Middlesex	
Five Points	Gloucester	Essex	
Flagg Street	Bridgewater	Plymouth	
Flat Hill	Amherst	Hampshire	
Flat Iron Point	Newburyport	Essex	
Flint Village	Fall River	Bristol	P.O. & locality
Forbes	Chelsea	Suffolk	
Forbes Station	Revere	Suffolk	
Forbush Hill	Bolton	Worcester	
Fordsville	Duxbury	Plymouth	
Forest Hills	Boston	Suffolk	in Jamaica Plain
Forest Park	Springfield	Hampden	P.O.
Forest River Station	Salem	Essex	
Forge Pond District	Granby	Hampshire	
Forge Village	Westford	Middlesex	
Fort Devens Station	Ayer	Middlesex	
Fort Hill	Boston	Suffolk	in Roxbury
Fort Hill	Eastham	Barnstable	
Fort Hill	Oxford	Worcester	
Fort Hill	Weymouth and Hingham	Norfolk	near town line
Foskett's Mills	Brimfield	Hampden	
Fosterville	Pembroke	Plymouth	
Foundry Village	Colrain	Franklin	
Four Corners	Becket	Berkshire	
Four Corners	Boston	Suffolk	
Four Corners	Chester	Hampden	
Four Corners	Clarksburg	Berkshire	
Four Corners	Dedham	Norfolk	
Four Corners	Greenwich	Hampshire	
Four Corners	Hanover	Plymouth	
Four Corners	Palmer	Hampden	
Fox Hill	Bernardston	Franklin	
Foxborough Center	Foxborough	Norfolk	
Foxtown	Shelburne	Franklin	
Foxvale	Foxborough	Norfolk	also known as Paineburg
Foxvale	Mansfield	Bristol	former RR station
Framingham Center	Framingham	Middlesex	
Franconia	Springfield	Hampden	
Franklin	Belchertown	Hampshire	
Franklin Park	Boston	Suffolk	borders Dorchester, Jamaica Plain, Roslindale & Roxbury
Franklin Park	Revere and part of Saugus	Suffolk	
French Hill	Marlborough	Middlesex	
French King	Gill	Franklin	
Fresh Brook	Wellfleet	Barnstable	
Fresh Pond Station	Cambridge	Middlesex	
Freshwater Cove Village	Gloucester	Essex	
Frye Village	Andover	Essex	also known as Abbott Village
Fryeville	Athol	Worcester	
Fryeville	Bolton	Worcester	
Fryville	Orange	Franklin	
Fullerville	Clinton	Worcester	
Fullerville	Hawley	Franklin	P.O. & locality
Furnace	Hardwick	Worcester	P.O.
Furnace	Orange	Franklin	
Furnace Hill	Cheshire	Berkshire	
Furnace Village	Easton	Bristol	
Furnace Village	Freetown	Bristol	
Garden City	Dudley and Webster	Worcester	on town line
Garden City	Newton	Middlesex	
Gardner Center	Gardner	Worcester	
Gardnerville	Duxbury	Plymouth	
Gates Crossing	Leominster	Worcester	former station
Gay Head Neck	Aquinnah	Dukes	
Germantown	Boston	Suffolk	in West Roxbury
Germantown	Clinton	Worcester	
Germantown	Dedham	Norfolk	
Germantown	New Bedford	Bristol	former name
Germantown	Quincy	Norfolk	
Gibbs Crossing	Ware	Hampshire	
Gibson Corner	Ayer	Middlesex	
Gilbertville	Hardwick	Worcester	
Gilboa	Douglas	Worcester	
Gilead	Charlemont	Franklin	
Gill's Corner	Stoughton	Norfolk	
Gleason Junction	Hudson	Middlesex	
Gleasondale	Stow	Middlesex	
Glen Mills	Georgetown	Essex	
Glenallan	Winchendon	Worcester	
Glendale	Easthampton	Hampshire	
Glendale	Everett	Middlesex	
Glendale	Middlefield	Hampshire	
Glendale	Wilbraham	Hampden	
Glendale Village	Easthampton	Hampshire	
Glenmere	Charlton	Worcester	
Glenmere	Lynn	Essex	former name, now East Lynn
Glennonville	Dalton	Berkshire	
Glennonville	Dalton	Berkshire	
Glenwood	Oxford	Franklin	former RR station
Glenwood	Springfield	Hampden	
Glenwood	Webster	Worcester	
Glenwood Station	Medford	Middlesex	
Globe	Southbridge	Worcester	
Globe Village	Fall River	Bristol	
Glover's Corner	Boston	Suffolk	in Dorchester
Golden Cove	Chelmsford	Middlesex	
Gomorrah	New Marlborough	Berkshire	
Goodell Hollow	Williamstown	Berkshire	
Goodrichville	Lunenburg	Worcester	
Goodyear Park	Holyoke	Hampden	
Gore	Blandford	Hampden	
Gore	Oxford	Worcester	
Goulding Village	Phillipston	Worcester	
Granby Hollow	Granby	Hampshire	also known as Aldrich Lake
Grand Island	Barnstable	Barnstable	
Granite Bridge	Boston	Suffolk	
Graniteville	Westford	Middlesex	
Gray Gables	Bourne	Barnstable	
Great Island	Gill	Franklin	
Great Plains	Edgartown	Dukes	
Great Pond	Eastham	Barnstable	
Great River	Deerfield	Franklin	
Green Lodge	Westwood	Norfolk	former RR station
Greenlodge	Dedham	Norfolk	
Greenville	Leicester	Worcester	
Greenville	Sandwich	Barnstable	former name, now Forestdale
Greenwater Pond	Becket	Berkshire	
Greenwich Plains	Greenwich	Hampshire	(town no longer exists)
Greenwich Village	Greenwich	Hampshire	P.O. see above
Greenwood	Millbury	Worcester	
Greenwood	Wakefield	Middlesex	
Greenwood Park	Westwood	Norfolk	
Greylock	North Adams	Berkshire	former station
Griswoldville	Colrain	Franklin	
Grove Hall	Boston	Suffolk	in Dorchester
Guinea	Newburyport	Essex	
Guinea	Plainville	Norfolk	
Gun Rock	Hull	Plymouth	
Gunn's Grove	Lanesborough	Berkshire	
Gurnet	Plymouth	Plymouth	
Gurney Corner	Hanson	Plymouth	
Hadley	Merrimac	Essex	
Hadley Acres	South Hadley	Hampshire	
Hagarville	New Salem	Franklin	
Haggetts Station	Andover	Essex	former station
Hall's Corner	Duxbury	Plymouth	
Hall's Ground	Clarksburg	Berkshire	
Hallockville	Hawley	Franklin	
Hallsville	Lawrence	Essex	
Hamerock	Charlton	Worcester	
Hammond Street	Worcester	Worcester	former RR station
Hammondtown	Mattapoisett	Plymouth	
Hampshire Village	Amherst	Hampshire	
Hampton Hill	Hull	Plymouth	
Hampton Mills	Easthampton	Hampshire	former RR station
Happy Hollow	Brockton	Plymouth	
Harbor View	Boston	Suffolk	in South Boston
Harbor View	Fairhaven	Bristol	
Harbor View Station	Boston	Suffolk	in East Boston
Harding	Medfield	Norfolk	P.O.
Harding Corner Station	Chatham	Barnstable	
Harmony	East Bridgewater	Plymouth	
Harness Shop Hill	Concord	Middlesex	
Harris	Rehoboth	Bristol	
Harrison Square	Boston	Suffolk	former RR station in Dorchester
Harrisville	West Boylston	Worcester	
Harrisville	Winchendon	Worcester	
Hartbrook	Hadley	Hampshire	
Hartsville	New Marlborough	Berkshire	
Harvard Lawn	Belmont	Middlesex	
Harvard Square	Cambridge	Middlesex	
Harwichport	Harwich	Barnstable	P.O. & locality
Harwoods Crossing	Barre	Worcester	
Haskins	Middleborough	Plymouth	former RR station
Hasting's Heights	Holyoke	Hampden	
Hastings Station	Weston	Middlesex	
Hastingsville	Framingham	Middlesex	
Hatchville	Duxbury	Plymouth	
Hatchville	Falmouth	Barnstable	P.O. & locality
Hatherly	Rockland	Plymouth	P.O.
Hathorne	Danvers	Essex	
Hathorne Station	Danvers	Essex	P.O. & locality
Hawes	Oxford	Worcester	
Hawks Brook	Methuen	Essex	
Hayden Row	Hopkinton	Middlesex	P.O.
Hazelwood Highland	Boston	Suffolk	
Hazelwood Station	Boston	Suffolk	
Head O'Pamet	Truro	Barnstable	
Head of the Bay	Bourne	Barnstable	
Head of the Meadow	Truro	Barnstable	
Head of Westport	Westport	Bristol	
Heald Village	Barre	Worcester	
Hebronville	Attleboro	Bristol	
Hecla	Uxbridge	Worcester	
Hell's Kitchen	Cheshire	Berkshire	
Herrick New	Salem	Franklin	
Heywood Station	Gardner	Worcester	
Heywoods	Gardner	Worcester	
Heywoods	Rowe	Franklin	
Hicksville	Dartmouth	Bristol	
High Head	Provincetown	Barnstable	also known as Peaked Hill
High Plains	Barre	Worcester	
High Rocks	Blackstone	Worcester	
Highland	Norfolk	Norfolk	
Highland	Springfield	Hampden	P.O.
Highland	Truro	Barnstable	
Highland Lake Station	Norfolk	Norfolk	
Highland Light	Truro	Barnstable	
Highland Park	Avon	Norfolk	
Highland Terrace	Brockton	Plymouth	
Highlands	Fall River	Bristol	
Highlands	Haverhill	Essex	
Highlands	Lowell	Middlesex P.O.	
Highlands	Lynn	Essex	
Highlands	Marshfield	Plymouth	now Marshfield Hills
Highlands	Melrose	Middlesex	
Highlands	Merrimac	Essex	
Highlands	Middleborough	Plymouth	
Highlands	Norfolk	Norfolk	
Highlands	Oak Bluffs	Dukes	
Highlands Lake	Norfolk	Norfolk	
Highlands Station	Winthrop	Suffolk	
Highlands Station	Woburn	Middlesex	RR station & locality
Highlandville	Needham	Norfolk	
Hill Crossing	Belmont	Middlesex	former RR station
Hillsboro	Leverett	Franklin	P.O.
Hillside	Athol	Worcester	
Hillside	Deerfield	Franklin	
Hillside	North Attleborough	Bristol	former station
Hillsville	Spencer	Worcester	
Hockanum	Hadley	Hampshire	
Hockanum	Yarmouth	Barnstable	
Hodges Village	Oxford	Worcester	
Hoggsback	Truro	Barnstable	
Hollingsworth Station	Pepperell	Middlesex	former RR station
Hollywood	Mattapoisett	Plymouth	
Holmes Neighborhood	North Attleborough	Bristol	
Holt	Andover	Essex	
Holtshire	Orange	Franklin	
Holyoke	Belchertown	Hampshire	
Homestead	Chelmsford	Middlesex	
Honeypot	Norfolk	Norfolk	
Hooker District	Southbridge	Worcester	
Hoosac	Deerfield	Franklin	
Hoosac Tunnel Station	Florida	Berkshire	
Hoosac Tunnel Village	Florida	Berkshire	
Hopeville	Taunton	Bristol	
Hopeville	Worcester	Worcester	
Horn Pond	Becket	Berkshire	
Horn Pond	Woburn	Middlesex	
Horse Neck Beach	Westport	Bristol	
Horton Signal	Rehoboth	Bristol	
Hortonville	Swansea	Bristol	
Hough's Neck	Quincy	Norfolk	
Houghtonville	Clarksburg	Berkshire	
Houghtonville	North Adams	Berkshire	
Hovenden Park	Brockton	Plymouth	
Howarths Station	Oxford	Worcester	former RR station
Howe Station	Middleton	Essex	former station
Howe Village	Boxford	Essex	
Howesville	Ashfield	Franklin	
Howland Station	Lakeville	Plymouth	former RR station
Howlands	Adams	Berkshire	former name, now Zylonite
Hubbard Corners	Agawam	Hampden	
Huckle Hill	Bernardston	Franklin	
Huff's Mill	Pepperell	Middlesex	
Huntsville	Huntington	Hampshire	
Hut Meadow	Cheshire	Berkshire	
Hyannis Port	Barnstable	Barnstable	
Hyde Park	Boston	Suffolk	
Hydeville	Winchendon	Worcester	
Iceville	Springfield	Hampden	
Indian Hill	Worcester	Worcester	
Indian Meeting House	Mashpee	Barnstable	
Indian Town	Fall River	Bristol	
Ingalls Station	North Andover	Essex	station & locality
Ingalls Station	Winthrop	Suffolk	
Inglewood	Methuen	Essex	
Inman Square	Cambridge	Middlesex	
Interlachen	Fall River	Bristol	
Intervale	Athol	Worcester	
Intervale Park	Brockton	Plymouth	
Ireland Parish	Holyoke	Hampden	former locality name
Ireland Street	Chesterfield	Hampshire	
Iron Works	Bridgewater and West Bridgewater	Plymouth	on town line
Ironstone	Uxbridge	Worcester	
Island Creek	Duxbury	Plymouth	
Island Park Station	Haverhill	Essex	
Islington	Westwood	Norfolk	near Dedham line
Jacksonville	Fitchburg	Worcester	
Jamaica Plain	Boston	Suffolk	
Jamesville	Worcester	Worcester	
Japan	Bridgewater	Plymouth	
Jefferson	Holden	Worcester	
Jeffries Point	Boston	Suffolk	in East Boston
Jenksville	Springfield	Hampden	
Jericho	Dalton	Berkshire	
Jericho	Dudley	Worcester	
Jerusalem	Dedham	Norfolk	
Jerusalem	Tyringham	Berkshire	
Jerusalem	West Bridgewater	Plymouth	
John's Pond	Carver	Plymouth	
Jones' Nose	Cheshire	Berkshire	
Joppa	Gloucester	Essex	
Joppa	Newburyport	Essex	
Joslinville	Townsend	Middlesex	
Judson	Raynham	Bristol	
Junction Station	Pittsfield	Berkshire	
Justice Hill	Sterling	Worcester	
Katama	Edgartown	Dukes	near South Beach
Keephikkon	Chilmark	Dukes	
Kempton Park	Dartmouth	Bristol	
Kempville	North Adams	Berkshire	
Kenberma	Hull	Plymouth	P.O. & locality
Kendall Green Station	Weston	Middlesex	
Kendall Hill	Sterling	Worcester	
Kendall Square	Cambridge	Middlesex	P.O. & locality
Kenersonville	New Bedford	Bristol	former locality name
Kenkaport	New Marlborough	Berkshire	
Kenmore Square	Boston	Suffolk	
Kenney Mills	Wareham	Plymouth	
Kenwood	Dracut	Middlesex	
Kenwood	Saugus	Essex	
Kettle Cove	Manchester-by-the-Sea	Essex	
Kingdom	Peabody	Essex	
Kingsbury District	Webster	Worcester	
Kingscroft	Peabody	Essex	
Kittredgeville	Dalton	Berkshire	
Klondike	Groveland	Essex	
Knightville	Huntington	Hampshire	
Knollmere	Fairhaven	Bristol	
Knollwood	Sharon	Norfolk	former RR station
Konkapot	New Marlborough	Berkshire	
Lake Attitash	Amesbury	Essex	
Lake Boone Station	Stow	Middlesex	
Lake Crossing	Wellesley	Norfolk	former RR station
Lake Mahkeenac	Stockbridge	Berkshire	also known as Stockbridge Bowl
Lake Park	Athol	Worcester	
Lake Pearl Station	Wrentham	Norfolk	
Lake Pleasant	Montague	Franklin	
Lake Street Station	Arlington	Middlesex	
Lake View	Worcester	Worcester	
Lake Walden	Concord	Middlesex	
Lakemont	Worcester	Worcester	
Lakeside	Lakeville	Plymouth	
Lakeside	Lynn	Essex	
Lakeview	Foxborough	Norfolk	
Lakeview	Foxborough	Norfolk	formerly Donkeyville
Lakeview	Tewksbury	Middlesex	
Lakeville	Belchertown	Hampshire	
Lakeville	Essex	Essex	
Lakeville	Shirley	Middlesex	
Lamb City	Phillipston	Worcester	
Lambert's Cove	West Tisbury	Dukes	
Lamedville	Auburn	Worcester	
Lane Village	Ashburnham	Worcester	
Lanesville	Gloucester	Essex	
Lanesville	North Attleborough	Bristol	renamed to Adamsdale in 1875
Larchwood	Cambridge	Middlesex	
Larnedville	Oxford	Worcester	
Laurel	Belchertown	Hampshire	
Laurel Park	Northampton	Hampshire	
Lawrence Station	Taunton	Bristol	
Leadmine	Sturbridge	Worcester	
Lebanon Mills	Seekonk	Bristol	
Lechmere Point	Cambridge	Middlesex	
Lechmere Square	Cambridge	Middlesex	
Ledgeville	Petersham	Worcester	
Leesville	Worcester	Worcester	
Lelandsville	Charlton	Worcester	
Lenox Dale	Lenox	Berkshire	
Lensdale	Southbridge	Worcester	
Leyden Park	Brockton	Plymouth	
Liberty	Belchertown	Hampshire	
Liberty Plain	Hingham	Plymouth	
Lighting Bug	Cummington	Hampshire	
Lincoln Hill	Cohasset	Norfolk	
Lincoln Square	Worcester	Worcester	
Linden Station	Malden	Middlesex	
Lindenwood Station	Stoneham	Middlesex	
Line	Colrain	Franklin	
Line Brook	Ipswich	Essex	
Linwood	Northbridge	Worcester	
Linwood	Uxbridge	Worcester	
Lithia	Goshen	Hampshire	
Little Bridge	Marshfield	Plymouth	
Little Canada	Lowell	Middlesex	
Little Neck	Ipswich	Essex	P.O.
Little Pond	Edgartown	Dukes	
Little Rest	Brimfield	Hampden	
Little River	Westfield	Hampden	
Littleton Common	Littleton	Middlesex	
Littletown	Marshfield	Plymouth	
Littleville	Chester	Hampden	
Loblolley	Gloucester	Essex	
Lock Village	Shutesbury	Franklin	
Lockerville	Framingham	Middlesex	
Lokerville	Wayland	Middlesex	
Long Hill	Bolton	Worcester	
Long Hill	Edgartown	Dukes	
Long Island	Boston	Suffolk	P.O.
Long Nook	Truro	Barnstable	
Long Plain	Acushnet	Bristol	
Long Point	Provincetown	Barnstable	
Long Pond	Eastham	Barnstable	
Longwood	Brookline	Norfolk	
Longwood Medical Area	Boston	Suffolk	
Lonicut	Attleboro	Bristol	
Loraine	North Adams	Berkshire	
Loring Avenue Station	Salem	Essex	
Loudville	Easthampton	Hampshire	
Loudville	Northampton	Hampshire	
Loudville	Westhampton	Hampshire	
Lovell Corners	Weymouth	Norfolk	
Lovell’s Island	Boston	Suffolk	
Lovellville	Holden	Worcester	
Lowell Junction Station	Andover	Essex	
Lower Bakersville	Pittsfield	Berkshire	
Lower Falls	Newton	Middlesex	
Lower Mills	Milton and Boston (Dorchester)	Norfolk and Suffolk	
Lower Plain	Hingham	Plymouth	
Lower Port	Cambridge	Middlesex	
Lower Village	Stow	Middlesex	
Lower Wire Village	Spencer	Worcester	also known as Proutyville
Ludlow City	Granby	Hampshire	
Lymanville	North Attleborough	Bristol	
Lynnhurst	Lynn	Essex	
Lynnhurst	Saugus	Essex	
Lyons Village	Monson	Hampden	
Lyonsville	Colrain	Franklin	
Machine Shop	North Andover	Essex	former RR station
Madaket	Nantucket	Nantucket	
Magnolia	Gloucester	Essex	P.O. & locality
Main Street	Billerica	Middlesex	former RR station
Manchaug Sutton	Worcester	P.O. & locality	
Mann's Crossing	Ashburnham	Worcester	
Mannville	Leicester	Worcester	
Manomet	Plymouth	Plymouth	P.O.
Maple Grove	Adams	Berkshire	formerly Arnoldsville
Maple Terrace	Holyoke	Hampden	
Mapleville	Wenham	Essex	
Maplewood	Fall River	Bristol	
Maplewood Station	Malden	Middlesex	RR station & locality
Maravista	Falmouth	Barnstable	
Marble Village	Sutton	Worcester	
Marblehead Neck	Marblehead	Essex	
Marbleridge Station	North Andover	Essex	
Marland Village	Andover	Essex	
Marlborough	Georgetown	Essex	
Marlborough Junction	Marlborough	Middlesex	
Mars Hill	Marshfield	Plymouth	
Marshall's Corner	Brockton	Plymouth	
Marshfield Hills	Marshfield	Plymouth	formerly Highlands
Martin Park	Franklin	Norfolk	
Martin's Pond	North Reading	Middlesex	
Mashnee Island	Bourne	Barnstable	
Matfield	East Bridgewater	Plymouth	
Mattapan	Boston	Suffolk	
Mattapoisette Neck	Mattapoisett	Plymouth	
Mayflower Heights	Provincetown	Barnstable	
Mayflower Park	Braintree	Norfolk	
Maywood	Auburn	Worcester	former RR station
Meadow Brook	Amesbury	Essex	
Meadowbrook	Norton	Bristol	former RR station
Meadows	Sunderland	Franklin	
Meadowview	North Reading	Middlesex	former RR station
Mechanicsville	Attleboro	Bristol	
Mechanicsville	Bellingham	Norfolk	
Mechanicsville	Fall River	Bristol	
Medford Hillside	Medford	Middlesex	
Meeting House Hill	Boston	Suffolk	in Dorchester
Meeting House Hill	Sterling	Worcester	
Megansett	Falmouth	Barnstable	
Menauhant	Falmouth	Barnstable	
Menemsha-Indian Wawaytick	Chilmark	Dukes	
Menlo Park	Brockton	Plymouth	
Merino Village	Webster	Worcester	
Merrick	West Springfield	Hampden	
Merrimacport	Merrimac	Essex	
Merrymount	Quincy	Norfolk	
Mica Mill	Chester	Hampden	
Mid Cambridge	Cambridge	Middlesex	
Middlesex Fells	Malden	Middlesex	
Middlesex Village	Lowell	Middlesex	
Middleton	Yarmouth	Barnstable	
Miles River Station	Hamilton	Essex	
Mill & Barre	Deerfield	Franklin	
Mill Hill	Edgartown	Dukes	
Mill Pond Bluff	Chatham	Barnstable	
Mill River	Deerfield	Franklin	
Mill River	New Marlborough	Berkshire	
Mill Valley	Amherst	Hampshire	
Mill Valley	Belchertown	Hampshire	
Mill Village	Ashby	Middlesex	
Mill Village	Dedham	Norfolk	
Mill Village	Deerfield	Franklin	
Mill Village	Sudbury	Middlesex	
Millbrook	Duxbury	Plymouth	P.O.
Miller Street Station	Ludlow	Hampden	
Millers Falls	Erving	Franklin	near Montague line
Millerville	Blackstone	Worcester	
Millington	New Salem	Franklin	P.O.
Millvale	Haverhill	Essex	
Millville	Blackstone	Worcester	
Millwood	Framingham	Middlesex	
Milward	Charlton	Worcester	
Milwood	Rowley	Essex	
Mishamet Point	Dartmouth	Bristol	
Mishawum Station	Woburn	Middlesex	
Mission Hill	Boston	Suffolk	
Mitchellville	Ayer	Middlesex	
Mittineague	West Springfield	Hampden	
Monatiquot Heights	Braintree	Norfolk	now Braintree Highlands
Money Hill	Wellfleet	Barnstable	
Money Hole Hill	Holyoke	Hampden	
Monomoy Island	Chatham	Barnstable	
Monponset Station	Hanson	Plymouth	P.O.
Montclair Station	Quincy	Norfolk	
Montello	Brockton	Plymouth	P.O. & locality
Montrose	Wakefield	Middlesex	
Montserrat	Beverly	Essex	
Montvale Station	Woburn	Middlesex	
Montville	Sandisfield	Berkshire	P.O. & locality
Montwait	Framingham	Middlesex	former RR station
Montwayte	Framingham	Middlesex	
Moody Corner	Granby	Hampshire	
Moores Corner	Leverett	Franklin	
Morgan's Crossing	New Salem	Franklin	former RR station
Morningdale	Boylston	Worcester	P.O.
Morningside	Pittsfield	Berkshire	
Morningside	Worcester	Worcester	
Morrils Station	Norwood	Norfolk	
Morse District	Southbridge	Worcester	
Morse's Corner	Brockton	Plymouth	
Morseville	Charlton	Worcester	
Morseville	Natick	Middlesex	
Morton Station	Charlton	Worcester	
Moscow	West Stockbridge	Berkshire	
Moultonville	Newburyport	Essex	
Mount Auburn Station	Cambridge	Middlesex	near Watertown line
Mount Bowdoin	Boston	Suffolk	
Mount Hermon	Gill	Franklin	
Mount Hermon	Northfield	Franklin	
Mount Hood	Melrose	Middlesex	
Mount Hope Station	Boston	Suffolk	West Roxbury
Mount Pleasant	Boston	Suffolk	Roxbury
Mount Pleasant	Dracut	Middlesex	
Mount Saint James	Worcester	Worcester	
Mount Section	Franklin	Norfolk	
Mount Tom	Easthampton and Northampton	Hampshire	
Mount Wachusett	Princeton	Worcester	
Mount Washington	Everett	Middlesex	
Muddy Brook	Cheshire	Berkshire	
Muggett	Charlton	Worcester	
Munroe Station	Lexington	Middlesex	
Muschopauge	Rutland	Worcester	former RR station
Musterfield	Abington	Plymouth	
Muttock	Middleborough	Plymouth	
Myricks	Berkley	Bristol	
Nabnasset	Westford	Middlesex	P.O.
Namequoit	Orleans	Barnstable	
Namskaket	Orleans	Barnstable	
Nanapashemet	Marblehead	Essex	
Nantasket	Hull	Plymouth	
Nantasket Beach	Hull	Plymouth	
Nantasket Junction	Hingham	Plymouth	R. R. Station
Nashaquitsa	Chilmark	Dukes	
Nashawena	Gosnold	Dukes	
Nashoba	Westford	Middlesex	
Nasketucket	Fairhaven	Bristol	
Naukeag	Ashburnham	Worcester	former RR station
Nauset Beach	Eastham	Barnstable	
Nausett	Eastham	Barnstable	
Naushon	Gosnold	Dukes	
Navy Yard	Dracut	Middlesex	
Navy Yard	Natick	Middlesex	
Nebnasset	Westford	Middlesex	
Nebraska Plain	Natick	Middlesex	
Neck	Chatham	Barnstable	
Needham Corner	Peabody	Essex	
Needham Highlands	Needham	Norfolk	also known as Highlandville
Neighborly Newton	Worcester	Worcester	
Nemasket	Middleborough	Plymouth	
Neponset	Boston	Suffolk	former station in Dorchester
New Boston	Dennis	Barnstable	
New Boston	Dracut	Middlesex	
New Boston	Fairhaven	Bristol	
New Boston	Fall River	Bristol	
New Boston	Framingham	Middlesex	now known as Nobscot
New Boston	North Attleborough	Bristol	
New Boston	Rutland	Worcester	
New Boston	Sandisfield	Berkshire	P.O. & locality
New Boston	Winchendon	Worcester	
New City	Blackstone	Worcester	
New City	Easthampton	Hampshire	
New Dublin	Cheshire	Berkshire	
New England Village	Grafton	Worcester	
New Jerusalem	Clinton	Worcester	
New Lenox	Lenox	Berkshire	P.O.
New Leverett	Leverett	Franklin	
New Maine	Foxborough	Norfolk	
New State	Foxborough	Norfolk	
Newell	Groton	Middlesex	former station
Newton Street	Waltham	Middlesex	former station
Nichewaug	Petersham	Worcester	
Nicholsville	Hubbardston	Worcester	
Nine Acre Corner	Concord	Middlesex	
Nine Acre Corner	Sudbury	Middlesex	
Nippenicket Park	Bridgewater	Plymouth	
Nissitisset	Pepperell	Middlesex	
Nobscot	Framingham	Middlesex	
Nockset	Gosnold	Dukes	
Nonantum Hill	Boston	Suffolk	
Nonquitt	Dartmouth	Bristol	
Norfolk Downs	Quincy	Norfolk	P.O. & locality
North Abington	Abington	Plymouth	
North Acton	Acton	Middlesex	
North Ashburnham	Ashburnham	Worcester	
North Becket	Becket	Berkshire	
North Bellingham	Bellingham	Norfolk	
North Bernardston	Bernardston	Franklin	
North Beverly	Beverly	Essex	
North Blandford	Blandford	Hampden	
North Brewster	Brewster	Barnstable	
North Bridge	Huntington	Hampshire	
North Cambridge	Cambridge	Middlesex	
North Carver	Carver	Plymouth	P.O.
North Charlton	Charlton	Worcester	
North Chatham	Chatham	Barnstable	
North Chelmsford	Chelmsford	Middlesex	
North Cheshire	Cheshire	Berkshire	
North Chester	Chester	Hampden	
North Chicopee	Chicopee	Hampden	
North Cohasset	Cohasset	Norfolk	
North Common	Westminster	Worcester	
North Dartmouth	Dartmouth	Bristol	
North Dennis	Dennis	Barnstable	
North Dighton	Dighton	Bristol	
North Duxbury	Duxbury	Plymouth	
North Easton	Easton	Bristol	P.O.
North Egremont	Egremont	Berkshire	
North End	Boston	Suffolk	
North End	Essex	Essex	
North Farms	Northampton	Hampshire	
North Foxborough	Foxborough	Norfolk	
North Framingham	Framingham	Middlesex	
North Franklin	Franklin	Norfolk	
North Hadley	Hadley	Hampshire	
North Hanover	Hanover	Plymouth	
North Longyard	Southwick	Hampden	
North Parish	Greenfield	Franklin	
North Pocasset	Bourne	Barnstable	
North Quarter	Concord	Middlesex	
North River	Colrain	Franklin	
North Side	Charlton	Worcester	
North Street Station	Salem	Essex	
North Tisbury	West Tisbury	Dukes	
North Village	Lancaster	Worcester	
North Village	Pepperell	Middlesex	
North Village	Webster	Worcester	
North Wilbraham	Wilbraham	Hampden	
North Woods	Holden	Worcester	
North Yarmouth	Manchester-by-the-Sea	Essex	
Northville	East Bridgewater	Plymouth	
Northville	Whitman	Plymouth	
Northville	Worcester	Worcester	
Norumbega Park	Newton	Middlesex	
Norwich	Huntington	Hampshire	
Norwottuck	Hadly	Hampshire	
Notch	North Adams	Berkshire	
Notown	Fitchburg	Worcester	
Notown	Westminster	Worcester	
Nourse's Corner	Lancaster	Worcester	
Nutting Lake	Billerica	Middlesex	
Nutting's Pond	Billerica	Middlesex	P.O.
Oak Grove	Malden	Middlesex	station & locality
Oak Grove Village	Fall River	Bristol	
Oak Hill	Brockton	Plymouth	
Oak Hill	Attleboro	Bristol	
Oak Island Station	Revere	Suffolk	
Oak Square	Boston	Suffolk	in Brighton
Oak Street Station	Springfield	Hampden	
Oakdale	Dedham	Norfolk	
Oakdale	Wareham	Plymouth	
Oakdale	West Boylston	Worcester	
Oakland	Taunton	Bristol	
Oakland	West Boylston	Worcester	
Oakland Station	Woburn	Middlesex	
Oaklands	Lowell	Middlesex	
Oaklands	Springfield	Hampden	
Oakside	Methuen	Essex	
Ocean Bluff	Marshfield	Plymouth	P.O. & locality
Ocean Heights	Edgartown	Dukes	
Ocean Spray Station	Winthrop	Suffolk	
Ocean View	Rockport	Essex	
Old Cambridge	Cambridge	Middlesex	
Old City	Townsend	Middlesex	
Old Colony House	Hingham	Plymouth	former RR station near Nantasket Junction
Old Common	Millbury	Worcester	
Old Deerfield	Deerfield	Franklin	
Old Furnace	Hardwick	Worcester	
Old Harbor	Chatham	Barnstable	
Old Harbor Village	Boston	Suffolk	
Old Spain	Weymouth	Norfolk	
Old Town	Newbury	Essex	
Old Town	North Attleborough	Bristol	
Olney Corners	Charlton	Worcester	
Orchard Valley	Amherst	Hampshire	
Ordway Station	Hudson	Middlesex	
Oregon	Ashland	Middlesex	
Oregon	Southborough	Worcester	in Fayville
Orient Heights	Boston	Suffolk	in East Boston
Osgood	Andover	Essex	
Otis Air Force Base	Falmouth	Barnstable	
Outer Brewster	Hull	Plymouth	
Over the River District	Brookfield	Worcester	
Overbrook	Wellesley	Norfolk	
Oxford	Fairhaven	Bristol	
Oxford Heights	Auburn	Worcester	
Oxford Heights	Fairhaven	Bristol	
Oyster Harbors	Barnstable	Barnstable	
Packachoag Hill	Auburn	Worcester	
Packardsville	Pelham	Hampshire	
Packertown	Wellfleet	Barnstable	
Padanaram	Dartmouth	Bristol	
Paineburg	Foxborough	Norfolk	also known as Foxvale
Pan	Bolton	Worcester	
Pansy Park	Belchertown	Hampshire	former RR station
Paper Mill	Haverhill	Essex	former RR station
Paper Mill Village	Bridgewater	Plymouth	also known as Pratt Town
Paper Mill Village	Groton	Middlesex	
Paper Mills	Peabody	Essex	
Park Hill	Easthampton	Hampshire	
Park Street	North Reading	Middlesex	former RR station
Park's Corner	Framingham	Middlesex	
Parker District	Charlton	Worcester	
Parker Hill	Boston	Suffolk	
Parker School House	Charlton	Worcester	
Parker's Mills	Oakham	Worcester	
Parker's Mills	Wareham	Plymouth	
Parkerville	Westford	Middlesex	
Parksville	Brimfield	Hampden	
Parkwood Beach	Wareham	Plymouth	P.O.
Parley Vale	Boston	Suffolk	
Parlowtown	Wareham	Plymouth	
Parting Ways	Acushnet	Bristol	
Partridge Hill	Charlton	Worcester	
Partridgeville	Athol	Worcester	
Partridgeville	Templeton	Worcester	
Pasque	Gosnold	Dukes	
Patch	Auburn	Worcester	
Pattenville	Billerica	Middlesex	on Tewksbury line
Paugatuck	West Springfield	Hampden	
Pawmet	Wellfleet	Barnstable	
Pawtucketville	Lowell	Middlesex	
Payson Park	Belmont	Middlesex	
Peaked Hill	Chilmark	Dukes	
Peaked Hill	Provincetown	Barnstable	
Pearl City	Hadley	Hampshire	
Peasville	Middleborough	Plymouth	
Pecksville	Shelburne	Franklin	
Pecousic	Springfield	Hampden	
Pelham Hollow	Pelham	Hampshire	
Pemberton	Hull	Plymouth	
Penikese	Gosnold	Dukes	
Perrins	Seekonk	Bristol	
Perry Hill	Acushnet	Bristol	
Perryville	Dudley	Worcester	
Perryville	Rehoboth	Bristol	
Perryville	Webster	Worcester	
Peter Hill	Ashfield	Franklin	
Petty's Plain	Deerfield	Franklin	
Phelps District	Blandford	Hampden	
Phelps Mills	Peabody	Essex	former RR station
Phillipdale	Charlton	Worcester	
Phillips	Andover	Essex	
Phillips Beach	Swampscott	Essex	
Piccadilly	Westborough	Worcester	
Pico Beach	Mattapoisett	Plymouth	
Pierces Bridge Station	Arlington	Middlesex	
Pierceville	Rochester	Plymouth	
Pigeon Cove	Rockport	Essex	
Pilgrim Heights	Truro	Barnstable	
Pill Hill	Brookline	Norfolk	
Pimlico	Barnstable	Barnstable	
Pine Grove	Newton	Middlesex	former RR station
Pine Heights	Dedham	Norfolk	
Pine Island	Mattapoisett	Plymouth	
Pine Neck	Deerfield	Franklin	
Pine Nook	Deerfield	Franklin	
Pine Point	Springfield	Hampden	
Pine Ridge	Dedham	Norfolk	
Pine Ridge Station	Concord	Middlesex	
Pinedale	Athol	Worcester	
Pinehurst	Billerica	Middlesex	
Pinehurst Beach	Wareham	Plymouth	P.O.
Pingreyville	Ayer	Middlesex	P.O. and locality
Pitcherville	Hubbardston	Worcester	
Plains	Edgartown	Dukes	
Plainville	Hadley	Hampshire	
Plainville	New Bedford	Bristol	
Playstead	Winthrop	Suffolk	
Pleasant Hill Station	Saugus	Essex	
Pleasant Lake	Harwich	Barnstable	P.O.
Pleasant Park	Brockton	Plymouth	
Pleasant Street Station	Stoneham	Middlesex	
Pleasant Street Station	Winthrop	Suffolk	
Pleasant Valley	Amesbury	Essex	
Pleasant Valley	Athol	Worcester	
Pleasant Valley	Methuen	Essex	
Pleasantville	Brockton	Plymouth	
Pleasantville	Freetown	Bristol	
Plimptonville	Walpole	Norfolk	
Plum Island	Newburyport	Essex	
Plum Trees	Sunderland	Franklin	
Plummer's	Northbridge	Worcester	
Pochassic	Westfield	Hampden	
Pocket	Orleans	Barnstable	
Podunk	Brookfield	Worcester	
Pohoganut	Edgartown	Dukes	
Point Independence	Wareham	Plymouth	
Point Of Pines	Revere	Suffolk	
Point Pleasant	Webster	Worcester	former RR station
Point Shirley	Winthrop	Suffolk	
Poland	Conway	Franklin	
Polandville	Webster	Worcester	
Polpis	Nantucket	Nantucket	
Pomeroy	Pittsfield	Berkshire	
Pond District	Amesbury	Essex	
Pondville	Auburn	Worcester	
Pondville	Norfolk	Norfolk	
Poniken	Lancaster	Worcester	
Ponkapoag	Canton	Norfolk	P.O. & locality
Pontoosuc	Pittsfield	Berkshire	
Poor	Andover	Essex	
Pope’s Hill	Boston	Suffolk	former RR station
Popes Point	Carver	Plymouth	
Poquanticut	Easton	Bristol	
Pork Lane	Cheshire	Berkshire	
Porter Square	Cambridge	Middlesex	
Porter's Pass	Brockton	Plymouth	
Porter's Station	Cambridge	Middlesex	
Portnomequot	Orleans	Barnstable	
Potenska Point	Dartmouth	Bristol	
Potomska	Dartmouth	Bristol	
Potopoag	Brookfield	Worcester	
Pottersville	Somerset	Bristol	P.O. & locality
Powder Horn Hill	Chelsea	Suffolk	
Powder Mill	Barre	Worcester	
Powder Point	Duxbury	Plymouth	
Powers Corner	Brimfield	Hampden	
Powers Mills	Phillipston	Worcester	
Pratt Town	Bridgewater	Plymouth	also known as Paper Mill Village
Pratts Junction	Sterling	Worcester	former station
Prattsville	Bridgewater	Plymouth	
Prattville	Chelsea	Suffolk	
Prattville	Raynham	Bristol	
Precinct	Lakeville	Plymouth	
Precinct	Taunton	Bristol	former RR station
Pride’s Crossing	Beverly	Essex	
Primus	Pepperell	Middlesex	former RR station
Pringeyville	Ayer	Middlesex	
Privilege	Blackstone	Worcester	
Proctor's Crossing	Peabody	Essex	former RR station
Proctorville	Athol	Worcester	
Prospect Hill	Brockton	Plymouth	
Prospect Hill	Chilmark	Dukes	
Prospect Hill	Somerville	Middlesex	former RR station
Prospect Park	Brockton	Plymouth	
Prospectville	Waltham	Middlesex	
Proutyville	Spencer	Worcester	also known as Lower Wire Village
Puddingshire	Middleborough	Plymouth	
Pumpkin Hollow	Conway	Franklin	
Pumpkin Hook	Cheshire	Berkshire	
Purchade	Middleborough	Plymouth	
Puritan Heights	Provincetown	Barnstable	former RR station
Putnam's Village	Charlton	Worcester	
Putnams	Middleborough	Plymouth	
Putnamville	Danvers	Essex	
Quabbin	Sutton	Worcester	former name, now South Sutton
Quaboag Village	North Brookfield	Worcester	
Quaker City	Uxbridge	Worcester	
Quaker District	Northbridge	Worcester	
Quaker Hill	Foxborough	Norfolk	
Quampacha	Edgartown	Dukes	
Quansoo	Chilmark	Dukes	
Quarry	Becket	Berkshire	
Quarry	West Stockbridge	Berkshire	
Queen Anne's Corner	Hingham	Plymouth	
Quenames	Chilmark	Dukes	
Quepeggue	Chilmark	Dukes	
Quidnet	Nantucket	Nantucket	
Quinapoxet	Holden	Worcester	
Quincy Adams Station	Quincy	Norfolk	
Quinebaug	Dudley	Worcester	
Quinsigamond Lake	Shrewsbury	Worcester	
Quisset	Falmouth	Barnstable	
Quitsey	Chilmark	Dukes	
Quitticus	Carver	Plymouth	
Race Point	Provincetown	Barnstable	
Raddin Station	Saugus	Essex	
Raddins	Lynn	Essex	
Rakeville	Bellingham	Norfolk	
Ram's Horn	Dudley	Worcester	
Randall Town	Mattapoisett	Plymouth	discontinued name
Rangeley Park	Brockton	Plymouth	
Rarkers Mills	Oakham	Worcester	
Rattlesnake Gutter	Leverett	Franklin	
Raymond	Plymouth	Plymouth	
Readville	Boston	Suffolk	
Readville Manor	Dedham	Norfolk	near Readville line
Red Bridge	Ludlow	Hampden	former RR station
Red Bridge	Stoughton	Norfolk	
Red Mills	Clarksburg	Berkshire	
Red School Station	Winchendon	Worcester	
Reformatory Station	Concord	Middlesex	
Renaud Heights	Fall River	Bristol	
Renfrew	Adams	Berkshire	
Renfrew	Dalton	Berkshire	
Renfrew	Dana now part of Quabbin Reservoir Reservation		
Reservoir	Becket	Berkshire	
Reservoir	Brookline	Norfolk	
Reservoir	Ludlow	Hampden	formerly Cherry Valley
Reservoir Hill	Cambridge	Middlesex	
Revere Beach	Revere	Suffolk	
Revere Street Station	Revere	Suffolk	
Rexhame	Marshfield	Plymouth	
Reynolds' Rock	Cheshire	Berkshire	
Rice Corner District	Brookfield	Worcester	
Rice Crossing	Wellesley	Norfolk	
Rice Village	Barre	Worcester	
Riceville	Athol	Worcester	
Richardson's Corner	Charlton	Worcester	
Richmond	Taunton	Bristol	
Richmond Furnace Station	Richmond	Berkshire	
Richmond Summit Station	Richmond	Berkshire	
Ricka Village	Haverhill	Essex	also known as Rock Village
Ridge Hill	Brockton	Plymouth	
Rings Corner	Amesbury	Essex	
Rings Island	Salisbury	Essex	
Ringville	Worthington	Hampshire	
Rising Corners	Southwick	Hampden	
Risingdale	Great Barrington	Berkshire	
Riverbank	Deerfield	Franklin	
Riverdale	Dedham	Norfolk	
Riverdale	Dracut	Middlesex	
Riverdale	Gloucester	Essex	
Riverdale	Northbridge	Worcester	
Riverdale	West Springfield	Hampden	
Riverdale	Whately and Deerfield	Franklin	
Rivermoore	Scituate	Plymouth	
Riverside	Cambridge	Middlesex	
Riverside	Gill	Franklin	
Riverside	Hatfield	Hampshire	
Riverside	Haverhill	Essex	
Riverside	Weston	Middlesex	
Riverside	Williamstown	Berkshire	
Riverside	Worthington	Hampshire	
Riverside Heights	Dedham	Norfolk	
Riverside Park	Concord	Middlesex	
Riverside Station	Holyoke	Hampden	
Riverside Station	Newton	Middlesex	in Auburndale
Riverview	Waltham	Middlesex	
Riverview Heights	Dedham	Norfolk	
Rivulet	Uxbridge	Worcester	
Roberts Station	Waltham	Middlesex	
Robinsonville	Attleboro	Bristol	
Robinsonville	Mansfield	Bristol	
Robinsonville	North Attleborough	Bristol	
Rochdale	Leicester	Worcester	
Rock Harbor	Orleans	Barnstable	
Rock Rimmon	Granby	Hampshire	
Rock Station	Middleborough	Plymouth	
Rock Village	Haverhill	Essex	
Rockbottom	Stow	Middlesex	
Rockdale	New Bedford	Bristol	
Rockdale	Northbridge	Worcester	
Rockdale Mills	West Stockbridge	Berkshire	
Rocky Hill	Amesbury	Essex	
Rocky Hill	Boston	Suffolk	
Rocky Hill Station	Milford	Worcester	
Rocky Neck	Gloucester	Essex	
Rocky Nook	Kingston	Plymouth	
Rogers Square	Lowell	Middlesex	
Rollstone Hill	Fitchburg	Worcester	
Rooty Plain	Rowley	Essex	
Rose Hill	Becket	Berkshire	
Rosemont Station	Haverhill	Essex	
Roslindale	Boston	Suffolk	
Round Hill Point	Dartmouth	Bristol	
Rowley Hill	Sterling	Worcester	
Roxbury Crossing	Boston	Suffolk	in Roxbury
Rugby	Boston	Suffolk	in Dorchester, former R.R. station
Rural District	Blackstone	Worcester	
Rushville	Springfield	Hampden	
Russell Mills	Dartmouth	Bristol	
Russell's	Pittsfield	Berkshire	
Russellville	Hadley	Hampshire	
Russellville	Southampton	Hampshire	
Rutland Heights	Rutland	Worcester	
Ryal Side	Beverly	Essex	
Ryder Village	Barre	Worcester	
Saccarapa	Oxford	Worcester	
Sacconeesett	Bourne	Barnstable	
Saconnesset	Falmouth	Barnstable	
Sagamore Beach	Bourne	Barnstable	
Sagamore City	Fall River	Bristol	
Sagamore Highlands	Bourne	Barnstable	
Sagamore Hill	Hull	Plymouth	
Salem Village	Danvers	Essex	also known as Danvers Centre
Salisbury Beach	Salisbury	Essex	
Salisbury Heights	Brockton	Plymouth	
Salisbury Plains	Salisbury	Essex	
Salisbury Point	Amesbury	Essex	
Salisbury Square	Brockton	Plymouth	
Salter's Point	Dartmouth	Bristol	
Sampsonville	Worthington	Hampshire	
Sand Hill	Sandwich	Barnstable	
Sandersdale	Southbridge	Worcester	
Sandhill Scituate	Plymouth	P.O.	
Sandsprings	Williamstown	Berkshire	
Sandy Hill	Chicopee	Hampden	
Sandy Neck	Barnstable	Barnstable	
Sandy Pond	Ayer	Middlesex	
Sandy Valley	Dedham	Norfolk	
Sanford's Bound	Westport	Bristol	near Tiverton, R.I. town line
Sankaty Bluff	Nantucket	Nantucket	
Santuit	Barnstable	Barnstable	
Saquis	Plymouth	Plymouth	
Satucket	East Bridgewater	Plymouth	
Saundersdale	Southbridge	Worcester	
Saundersville	Grafton	Worcester	
Savaryville	Groveland	Essex	
Savin Hill	Boston	Suffolk	in Dorchester, formerly known as Rocky Hill
Sawtelleville	Brockton	Plymouth	
Saxonville	Framingham	Middlesex	P.O. & locality
Scaden	Uxbridge	Worcester	
Scantic	Hampden	Hampden	
Scargo Hill	Dennis	Barnstable	
Schooset	Pembroke	Plymouth	
Schooset	Taunton	Bristol	
Sconticut Neck	Fairhaven	Bristol	
Scorton	Sandwich	Barnstable	
Scotland	Andover	Essex	
Scotland	Bridgewater	Plymouth	
Scott Hill	Bellingham	Norfolk	
Scrabbletown	Cheshire	Berkshire	
Sea View	Marshfield	Plymouth	
Searsville	Dennis	Barnstable	
Searsville	Williamsburg	Hampshire	
Seaside	Plymouth	Plymouth	former name, now Cordage
Second Parish	Boxford	Essex	also known as West Parish
Seconnet	Mashpee	Barnstable	
Seekonk	Great Barrington	Berkshire	
Segreganset	Berkley	Bristol	
Segreganset	Dighton	Bristol	
Shaboken	Harvard	Worcester	
Shady Hill	Bedford	Middlesex	former RR station
Shaker Village	Ayer	Middlesex	
Shaker Village	Harvard	Worcester	
Shaker Village	Pittsfield	Berkshire	
Shaker Village	Shirley	Middlesex	
Shakers	Enfield now part of Quabbin Reservoir Reservation		
Shattuckville	Colrain	Franklin	
Shaw's Corner	Brockton	Plymouth	
Shawmut	New Bedford	Bristol	
Shawsheen Village	Andover	Essex	
Shawville	Wales	Hampden	
Sheldonville	Wrentham	Norfolk	
Shepardville	Plainville	Norfolk	
Sherwood	Williamstown	Berkshire	
Shirkshire	Conway	Franklin	
Shoe String District or Village	Carver	Plymouth	
Shore Acres	Scituate	Plymouth	
Shorley	Palmer	Hampden	
Shuttleville	Southbridge	Worcester	
Siasconset	Nantucket	Nantucket	P.O.
Sibleyville	Attleboro	Bristol	
Siggsville	Adams	Berkshire	
Silver Beach	Falmouth	Barnstable	P.O.
Silver Hill Station	Weston	Middlesex	
Silver Lake Station	Wilmington	Middlesex	
Simpson's Village	Millbury	Worcester	
Sippecan	Marion	Plymouth	
Sippewisset	Falmouth	Barnstable	
Sixteen Acres	Springfield	Hampden	
Skinner	Shelburne	Franklin	
Skinner Hill	Boston	Suffolk	in Roslindale
Skinnerville	Williamsburg	Hampshire	
Slab City	Belchertown	Hampshire	
Slab City	Leverett	Franklin	
Slocum	Acushnet	Bristol	
Smith Crossing Station	Hardwick	Worcester	near New Braintree line
Smith's Neck	Dartmouth	Bristol	
Smith's Station	Enfield	Hampshire	
Smiths	Enfield	now incorporated into the Quabbin Reservoir	
Smithville	Barre	Worcester	former name, now White Valley
Smithville	Spencer	Worcester	
Snake Hill	Charlton	Worcester	
Snellville	Sturbridge	Worcester	
Soapstone	New Salem	Franklin	former RR station
Sodam	Hanson	Plymouth	
Sodam	Rowley	Essex	
Sodam	Tyringham	Berkshire	
Sodham	Scituate	Plymouth	
Soldiers Field	Boston	Suffolk	in Allston
Somerset Junction	Fall River	Bristol	
South	Fall River	Bristol	P.O.
South Ashfield	Ashfield	Franklin	
South Athol	Athol	Worcester	
South Barre	Barre	Worcester	
South Beach	Edgartown	Dukes	
South Becket	Becket	Berkshire	
South Belchertown	Belchertown	Hampshire	
South Bellingham	Bellingham	Norfolk	
South Berlin	Berlin	Worcester	
South Billerica	Billerica	Middlesex	
South Bolton	Bolton	Worcester	
South Boston	Boston	Suffolk	
South Boylston	Boylston	Essex	
South Braintree	Braintree	Norfolk	
South Braintree Heights	Braintree	Norfolk	
South Byfield	Newbury	Essex	
South Carver	Carver	Plymouth	P.O.
South Charlton	Charlton	Worcester	
South Chatham	Chatham	Barnstable	
South Chelmsford	Chelmsford	Middlesex	
South Colrain	Colrain	Franklin	
South Cove	Boston	Suffolk	also known as Bay Village
South Dartmouth	Dartmouth	Bristol	
South Dedham	Dedham	Norfolk	
South Dighton	Dighton	Bristol	
South Douglas	Douglas	Worcester	
South Eastham	Eastham	Barnstable	
South Easton	Easton	Bristol	P.O.
South Easton Green	Easton	Bristol	
South Egremont	Egremont	Berkshire	
South End	Boston	Suffolk	
South Essex	Essex	Essex	
South Everett	Everett	Middlesex	
South Fitchburg	Fitchburg	Worcester	
South Foxborough	Foxborough	Norfolk	
South Framingham	Framingham	Middlesex	
South Franklin	Franklin	Norfolk	
South Gardner	Gardner	Worcester	
South Georgetown	Georgetown	Essex	
South Hill	Ashburnham	Worcester	
South Hopedale	Hopedale	Worcester	
South Longyard	Southwick	Hampden	
South Park	Athol	Worcester	
South Part	Conway	Franklin	
South Pocasset	Bourne	Barnstable	
South Pond Village	Plymouth	Plymouth	
South River	Deerfield	Franklin	former RR station
South Rowe	Townsend	Middlesex	
South Vernon	Northfield	Franklin	
South Village	Ashby	Middlesex	
South Village	Dennis	Barnstable	
South Village	Webster	Worcester	
Southfield	New Marlborough	Berkshire	
Southville	Southborough	Worcester	
Southwick District	Uxbridge	Worcester	
Spectacle Island	Boston	Suffolk	
Spindleville	Hopedale	Worcester	
Spotless Town	Randolph	Norfolk	
Sprague's Hill	Bridgewater	Plymouth	
Spring Hill	Somerville	Middlesex	
Spring Road Crossing	Bedford	Middlesex	former RR station
Springdale	Canton	Norfolk	
Springdale	Holden	Worcester	
Springdale	Westfield	Hampden	
Springhill	Sandwich	Barnstable	
Spruce Corner	Ashfield	Franklin	
Squamacook Junction	Groton	Middlesex	
Squantum	Quincy	Norfolk	
Squareshire	Sterling	Worcester	
Squawbetty	Taunton	Bristol	
Squibnocket	Chilmark	Dukes	
St. Moritz	Quincy	Norfolk	
Stafford's Hill	Cheshire	Berkshire	
Standish	Pembroke	Plymouth	
Standish	Marshfield	Plymouth	
Stanley	Bridgewater	Plymouth	former RR station
State Alms House	Monson	Hampden	
State Farm	Bridgewater	Plymouth	
State Line	Monson	Hampden	
State Line	West Stockbridge	Berkshire	P.O. & RR station
Steep Brook	Fall River	Bristol	
Sternsville	Pittsfield	Berkshire	
Steven's Village	Dudley	Worcester	
Stevens	North Andover	Essex	former RR station
Stevensville	Webster	Worcester	
Stevensville	Worthington	Hampshire	
Stickneyville	Groveland	Essex	
Still River	Bolton	Worcester	
Still River	Harvard	Worcester	P.O. & locality
Stillwater	Deerfield	Franklin	
Stockbridge Bowl	Stockbridge	Berkshire	also known as Lake Mahkeenac
Stone Factory	Canton	Norfolk	
Stone Haven	Dedham	Norfolk	
Stone’s Crossing	Auburn	Worcester	former RR station
Stonehaven	Rockport	Essex	
Stoneville	Auburn	Worcester	
Stonewall	Chilmark	Dukes	
Stoney Beach	Plymouth	Plymouth	
Stoney Brook	Boston	Suffolk	in Jamaica Plain
Stoney Brook	Weston	Middlesex	P.O. & locality
Stoney Brook Reservation	Boston	Suffolk	in Hyde Park
Stormy Hill	Dedham	Norfolk	
Storrowton	West Springfield	Hampden	Historic "village" at the Eastern States Exposition
Straits Pond	Hull	Plymouth	P.O.
Straw Hollow	Boylston	Worcester	
Strawberry Hill	Cambridge	Middlesex	
Strawberry Hill	Hull	Plymouth	
Succonesset	Mashpee	Barnstable	
Suffolk Downs	Boston	Suffolk	in East Boston
Sugar Hill	Chesterfield	Hampshire	
Sullivan Square	Boston	Suffolk	in Charlestown
Summit	Worcester	Worcester	
Summit Grove	Dartmouth	Bristol	
Sunnyside	Athol	Worcester	
Sunnyside	Boston	Suffolk	in Hyde Park
Sunset Point	Hull	Plymouth	
Suntaug	Lynnfield	Essex	
Surfside	Hull	Plymouth	
Surfside	Nantucket	Nantucket	
Swan's Tavern	Stoughton	Norfolk	
Sweeneyville	Topsfield	Essex	
Sweet's Corner	Williamstown	Berkshire	
Swift River	Cummington	Hampshire	
Swifts Beach	Wareham	Plymouth	
Sylvester Corner	Brockton	Plymouth	
Symmes Corner	Winchester	Middlesex	
Taber Hill	Acushnet	Bristol	
Tack Factory	Middleborough	Plymouth	
Taconic	Pittsfield	Berkshire	
Taft's Mills	Oxford	Worcester	
Taggart	Blandford	Hampden	
Talbot	Northborough	Worcester	
Talbot Corner	Stoughton	Norfolk	
Tallawanda	Worcester	Worcester	
Tanner District	Webster	Worcester	
Tapleyville	Danvers	Essex	
Tar Hill	Fitchburg	Worcester	
Tarklin	Duxbury	Plymouth	
Tasseltop	Douglas	Worcester	
Tatham	West Springfield	Hampden	
Taylor's Bridge	Chesterfield	Hampshire	
Tempest Knob Station	Wareham	Plymouth	
Tennyville	Palmer	Hampden	
Terry's	Freetown	Bristol	former RR station
Texas Village	Oxford	Worcester	
The Bars	Deerfield	Franklin	
The Bars	Deerfield	Franklin	
The Bars	Pittsfield	Berkshire	
The Bluffs	Ipswich	Essex	
The Castle	Truro	Barnstable	
The Cleghorn	Fitchburg	Worcester	
The Cobbles	Cheshire	Berkshire	
The Glades	Scituate	Plymouth	
The Graves	Hull	Plymouth	
The Green	Middleborough	Plymouth	
The Highlands	Danvers	Essex	
The Hopper	Williamstown	Berkshire	
The Kitchen	Cheshire	Berkshire	
The Point	Brookline	Norfolk	
The Quag	Sterling	Worcester	
Boston Theater District	Boston	Suffolk	
Thermopylae	South Hadley	Hampshire	
Thicket	Abington	Plymouth	
Thomaston Park	Brockton	Plymouth	
Thomastown	Middleborough	Plymouth	
Thompson Corners	Charlton	Worcester	
Thompson Island	Essex	Essex	
Thompson’s Island	Boston	Suffolk	
Thomsonville	Enfield	Hampshire	
Thorndike	Palmer	Hampden	
Thornton	Winthrop	Suffolk	
Three Roads	Newburyport	Essex	
Thunder	Cheshire	Berkshire	
Thwaites	Freetown	Bristol	
Tihonet	Wareham	Plymouth	
Tilden Island	Marshfield	Plymouth	
Tillotson's	Pittsfield	Berkshire	
Tinkertown	Duxbury	Plymouth	
Tinkhamtown	Mattapoisett	Plymouth	
Titicut	Middleborough	Plymouth	
Tonset	Orleans	Barnstable	
Touisset	Swansea	Bristol	P.O. & locality formerly known as Coles Station
Tower Hill	Brockton	Plymouth	
Tower Hill	Wayland	Middlesex	
Town Green	Brookline	Norfolk	
Town Hill	Topsfield	Essex	
Town House	Dennis	Barnstable	
Town House	Yarmouth	Barnstable	
Townsend Hill	Townsend	Middlesex	
Traskville	Fitchburg	Worcester	
Tremont	Wareham	Plymouth	
Trinity Place Station	Boston	Suffolk	
Trouant's Island	Marshfield	Plymouth	
Trowbridgeville	Worcester	Worcester	
Tuckernuck	Nantucket	Nantucket	
Tufts	Dudley	Worcester	
Tufts College	Medford	Middlesex	P.O.
Tufts Village	Dudley	Worcester	
Tullyville	Orange	Franklin	
Turkey Hill	Arlington	Middlesex	
Turkey Hill	Belchertown	Hampshire	
Turnpike	Billerica	Middlesex	former RR station
Two Mile Purchase	Swansea	Bristol	
Twopenny Loaf	Gloucester	Essex	
Tylerville	Belchertown	Hampshire	
U.S. Navy Yard	Boston	Suffolk	in Charlestown
Uncatena	Gosnold	Dukes	
Union Market Station	Watertown	Middlesex	
Union Square	Boston	Suffolk	in Allston
Union Square	Gardner	Worcester	
Union Square	Somerville	Middlesex	
Uniondale	Holden	Worcester	
Unionville	Colrain	Franklin	
Unionville	Easton	Bristol	
Unionville	Franklin	Norfolk	
Unionville	Holden	Worcester	
Uphams Corner	Boston	Suffolk	in Dorchester
Upper Dedham	Dedham	Norfolk	
Upper Falls	Newton	Middlesex	
Upper Plains	Hingham	Plymouth	
Vallerville	Plymouth	Plymouth	
Valley Falls	Worcester	Worcester	
Van Deusenville	Great Barrington	Berkshire	
Vaughn’s Hill	Bolton	Worcester	
Vesper Country Club	Tyngsborough	Middlesex	former RR station
Vineyard Grove	Edgartown	Dukes	
Vose	Groton	Middlesex	
Wachogue	Springfield	Hampden	
Wachusett	Fitchburg	Worcester	
Wachusett Station	Fitchburg	Worcester	
Wachusett Village	Westminster	Worcester	
Wadsworth	Franklin	Norfolk	
Waite's Corner	Fitchburg	Worcester	
Wakeby	Sandwich	Barnstable	
Walker	Taunton	Bristol	
Walkerville	Natick	Middlesex	
Wallace Hill	Townsend	Middlesex	
Wallum Pond	Douglas	Worcester	
Walnut Bottom	Brockton	Plymouth	
Walnut Hill	Woburn	Middlesex	
Wamesit	Tewksbury	Middlesex	
Wampum Station	Wrentham	Norfolk	
Wandville	Ashfield	Franklin	
Wapping	Deerfield	Franklin	
Wapping Road Village	Kingston	Plymouth	
Waquoit	Falmouth	Barnstable	
Ward Hill	Haverhill	Essex	P.O. & locality
Wardville	Ashfield	Franklin	
Wares	Plymouth	Plymouth	
Washacum	Sterling	Worcester	former station
Washington	Belchertown	Hampshire	
Washington Park	Everett	Middlesex	
Washington Square	Brookline	Norfolk	
Washington Square	Worcester	Worcester P.O.	
Washington Street	Whitman	Plymouth	former RR station
Washington Village	Boston	Suffolk	in South Boston
Waterford	Blackstone	Worcester	
Waters River	Danvers	Essex	
Waterville	Middleborough	Plymouth	
Waterville	Winchendon	Worcester	
Watson	Ashfield	Franklin	
Wattoquotoc	Bolton	Worcester	
Watuppa	Fall River	Bristol	
Wauwinet	Nantucket	Nantucket	
Waveland	Hull	Plymouth	
Waverley	Belmont	Middlesex	
Wayside Inn Station	Wayland	Middlesex	
Webster Junction	Auburn	Worcester	also known as Oxford Heights
Webster Mills	Webster	Worcester	former station
Wedgemere	Winchester	Middlesex	
Weedenville	Fairhaven	Bristol	
Weepeckets	Gosnold	Dukes	
Weir	Taunton	Bristol	
Weir River	Hull	Plymouth	former RR station
Weir Village	Taunton	Bristol	
Weir Village	Yarmouth	Barnstable	
Weld Street Station	New Bedford	Bristol	
Wellesley Farms	Wellesley	Norfolk	area and RR Station
Wellesley Hills	Wellesley	Norfolk	area and RR Station
Wellesley Square	Wellesley	Norfolk	area and RR Station
Wellingsly	Plymouth	Plymouth	
Wellington	Medford	Middlesex	
Wellington Hill	Boston	Suffolk	
Wenammet Neck	Bourne	Barnstable	also known as Wing's Neck
Wendell Station	Wendell	Franklin	
Wenham	Carver	Plymouth	
Wessagusett	Weymouth	Norfolk	
Wessonville	Westborough	Worcester	Lyman School section
West Abington	Abington	Plymouth	
West Acton	Acton	Middlesex	
West Alford	Alford	Berkshire	
West Andover	Andover	Essex	
West Auburn	Auburn	Worcester	
West Attleboro	Attleboro	Bristol	
West Barre	Barre	Worcester	
West Beach	Beverly	Essex	
West Becket	Becket	Berkshire	
West Bedford	Bedford	Middlesex	
West Berlin	Berlin	Worcester	
West Billerica	Billerica	Middlesex	
West Boxford	Boxford	Essex	
West Brimfield	Brimfield	Hampden	
West Brook	Hatfield	Hampshire	
West Brook Village	Newton	Middlesex	
West Cambridge	Cambridge	Middlesex	
West Chatham	Chatham	Barnstable	
West Chelmsford	Chelmsford	Middlesex	
West Chesterfield	Chesterfield	Hampshire	P.O. & locality
West Chop	Tisbury	Dukes	
West Concord	Concord	Middlesex	
West Corners	Randolph	Norfolk	
West Crook	East Bridgewater	Plymouth	
West Cummington	Cummington	Hampshire	
West Dedham	Dedham	Norfolk	
West Deerfield	Deerfield	Franklin	
West Dighton	Dighton	Bristol	
West Douglas	Douglas	Worcester	
West Dudley	Dudley	Worcester	
West Duxbury	Duxbury	Plymouth	
West Egremont	Egremont	Berkshire	
West End	Bolton	Worcester	
West End	Boston	Suffolk	
West End	Provincetown	Barnstable	
West Everett	Everett	Middlesex	
West Farms	Beverly	Essex	
West Farms	Northampton	Hampshire	
West Farms	Westfield	Hampden	
West Fitchburg	Fitchburg	Worcester	
West Foxborough	Foxborough	Norfolk	
West Gardner	Gardner	Worcester	
West Hamilton	Framingham	Middlesex	
West Hill	Belchertown	Hampshire	
West Hanover	Hanover	Plymouth	
West Hyannis	Barnstable	Barnstable	
West Mountain	Bernardston	Franklin	
West Mountain	Cheshire	Berkshire	
West Parish	Granby	Hampshire	
West Parish	Haverhill	Essex	
West Parish	Newton	Middlesex	
West Parish	Westfield	Hampden	
West Park	Beverly	Essex	
West Scituate	Norwell	Plymouth	
West Somerville	Somerville	Middlesex	
West Street Station	Everett	Middlesex	
West Tatnuck	Worcester	Worcester	
West Village	North Reading	Middlesex	
Westdale	East Bridgewater	Plymouth	
Westdale	West Bridgewater	Plymouth	
Westlake	East Bridgewater	Plymouth	
Westlands	Chelmsford	Middlesex	
Westlands	Saugus	Essex	
Westover Air Base (USAF)	Chicopee	Hampden	
Westport Factory	Dartmouth	Bristol	
Westport Mills	Dartmouth	Bristol	
Westside	West Springfield	Hampden	
Westvale	Concord	Middlesex	
Westville	Sturbridge	Worcester	
Westville	Taunton	Bristol	
Westwood Hills	Worcester	Worcester	
Weymouth Landing	Weymouth and part of Braintree	Norfolk	
Whalom	Lunenburg	Worcester	
Wheeler Park	Brockton	Plymouth	
Wheeler Village	Millbury	Worcester	
Wheeler’s Hill	Berlin	Worcester	
Wheelerville	Orange	Franklin	
Wheelockville	Blackstone	Worcester	
Wheelockville	Uxbridge	Worcester	
Wheelwright	Hardwick	Worcester	P.O. also known as Hardwick Depot
Whipples Station	Palmer	Hampden	
White City	Boston	Suffolk	in Jamaica Plain
White City	Hopedale	Worcester	
White City	Shrewsbury	Worcester	
White Hall	Rutland	Worcester	
White Horse Beach	Plymouth	Plymouth	P.O.
White Oaks	Williamstown	Berkshire	
White Valley	Barre	Worcester	formerly Smithville
Whitehead	Hull	Plymouth	
Whiteville	Mansfield	Bristol	
Whitins Station	Northbridge	Worcester	
Whitmanville	Truro	Barnstable	
Whitmanville	Westminster	Worcester	
Whitney	Sherborn	Middlesex	
Whitney District	Washington	Berkshire	
Whittenton	Taunton	Bristol	
Wianno	Barnstable	Barnstable	
Wickfield	South Hadley	Hampshire	
Wigginville	Lowell	Middlesex	
Wilbur's Point	Fairhaven	Bristol	
Wilkinsonville	Sutton	Worcester	P.O. & locality
Wilkinsville	Hudson	Middlesex	
Williamsville	West Stockbridge	Berkshire	
Willimansett	Chicopee	Hampden	P.O. & locality
Willis Place	Colrain	Franklin	
Williston Mills	Easthampton	Hampshire	
Willowdale	Ipswich	Essex	
Willows	Ayer	Middlesex	former RR station
Wilson Hill	Colrain	Franklin	
Wilson's Mountain	Dedham	Norfolk	
Winchendon Springs	Winchendon	Worcester	
Winchester Park	Brockton	Plymouth	
Windmere	Chatham	Barnstable	
Windmere	Hull	Plymouth	
Windsor Park	Boylston	Worcester	
Wing's Neck	Bourne	Barnstable	also known as Wenammet Neck
Winheconnet	Norton	Bristol	
Winlows Crossing	Hanover	Plymouth	
Winlows Station	Norwood	Norfolk	
Winnetuxet	Plympton	Plymouth	
Winnmere	Burlington	Middlesex	
Winter Hill	Somerville	Middlesex	
Winter's Corner	Brockton	Plymouth	
Winterville	New Bedford	Bristol	
Wintucket	Edgartown	Dukes	
Wipples Station	Palmer	Hampden	
Wire Village	Spencer	Worcester	also known as Upper Wire Village
Wollaston Station	Quincy	Norfolk	P.O. & locality
Wood End	Provincetown	Barnstable	
Wood Island	Boston	Suffolk	
Wood Island Station	Boston	Suffolk	East Boston
Wood's Hole	Falmouth	Barnstable	
Woodbourne	Boston	Suffolk	in Jamaica Plain
Woodburys Station	Hamilton	Essex	
Woodland Station	Newton	Middlesex	
Woodlawn	Everett	Middlesex	
Woodlawn	South Hadley	Hampshire	
Woodruff Heights	Clinton	Worcester	
Woodside Mills	Northborough	Worcester	
Woodsville	Shirley	Middlesex	
Woodville	Hopkinton	Middlesex	
Woonsocket Junction	Blackstone	Worcester	
Worcester Heights	Newburyport	Essex	
World's End	Hingham	Plymouth	
Woronoco	Russell	Hampden	
Wyckoff Park	Holyoke	Hampden	
Wyoma	Lynn	Essex	
Wyoming	Melrose	Middlesex	
Yarmouthport	Yarmouth	Barnstable	
Yellow Town	Wareham	Plymouth	
Yokum Pond	Becket	Berkshire	
York	Canton	Norfolk	
Zylonite	Adams	Berkshire	formerly Howlands

== See also ==
- List of municipalities in Massachusetts
- Category:Census-designated places in Massachusetts
