= West Parish Center District =

Historic district in Massachusetts, United States

- U.S. National Register of Historic Places
- U.S. Historic district
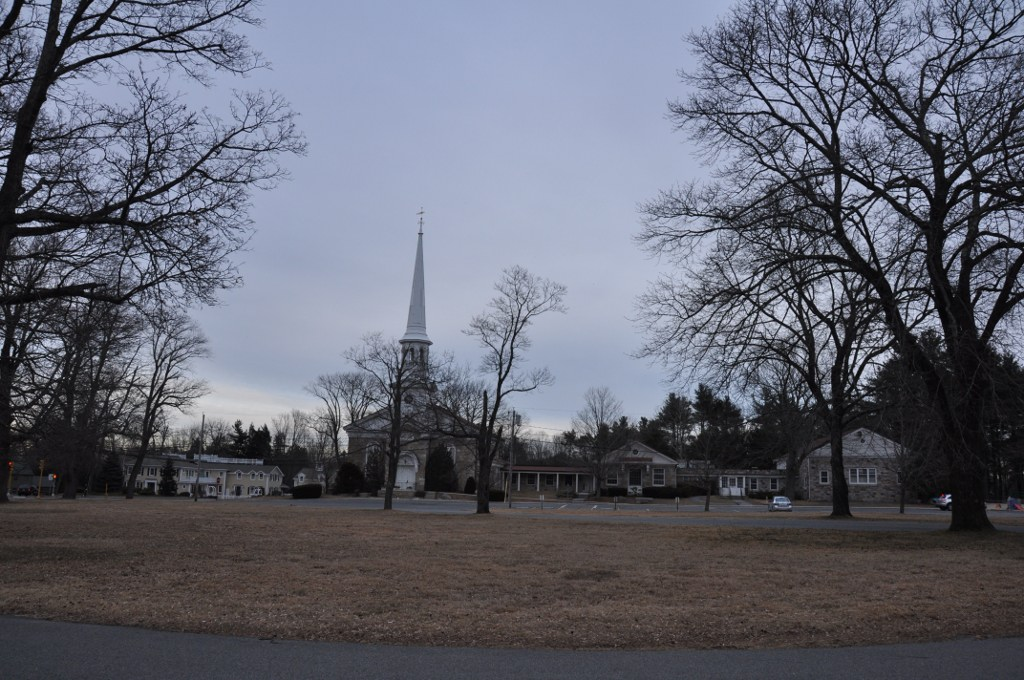
- West Parish Common and Church

- Location within Massachusetts Location within the United States
- Location: Andover, Massachusetts
- Coordinates: 42°39′26″N 71°9′56″W
- Area: 90 acres (36 ha)
- Architect: Multiple
- Architectural style: Greek Revival, Georgian, Federal
- MPS: Town of Andover MRA
- NRHP reference No.: 82000480
- Added to NRHP: October 7, 1982

The West Parish Center District encompasses the social and religious center of the part of Andover, Massachusetts, that is located west of the Shawsheen River. It is mostly spread along Lowell Street (Massachusetts Route 133) on either side of a major intersection with four other roads: Shawsheen Road, Reservation Road, Beacon Street, and High Plain Road. The centerpiece of the district is the 1826 West Parish Church, which is the oldest church standing in Andover. It is an elegant Federal style granite structure topped with a wooden steeple, added in 1863. The roof is made of Spanish tile, which was probably part of changes made around 1908. Opposite the church on the south side of the common is the West Parish Cemetery, which began as a small burying ground in the 1790s, and was substantially enlarged and restyled (including the addition of the large arch at its main entrance) in the early 1900s.

In addition to the church, common, and cemetery, a number of period houses line Lowell Street and the nearby streets. Most of them were built between 1780 and 1830, and are in Federal or Greek Revival styles. One notable exception is the C. A. Holt House at 202 Shawsheen Road, which is a fine Queen Anne style Victorian. The newest house in the district, 181 Lowell Street, is a Bungalow-style 1-1/2 story house built about 1920, and the oldest is an early Federal style house built about 1780, at 173 Lowell.

The district was listed on the National Register of Historic Places in 1982.

== See also ==
- National Register of Historic Places listings in Andover, Massachusetts
- National Register of Historic Places listings in Essex County, Massachusetts
