= Acushnet =

Acushnet may refer to:

== Places ==
- Acushnet, Massachusetts, U.S.
  - Acushnet Center, Massachusetts
- Acushnet Heights Historic District, New Bedford, Massachusetts
- Acushnet River, in Massachusetts

== Other uses ==
- Acushnet Company, golf equipment manufacturer
- Acushnet, a whaling ship on which Herman Melville served
