= Bristol County, Massachusetts =

County in Massachusetts, United States

- County
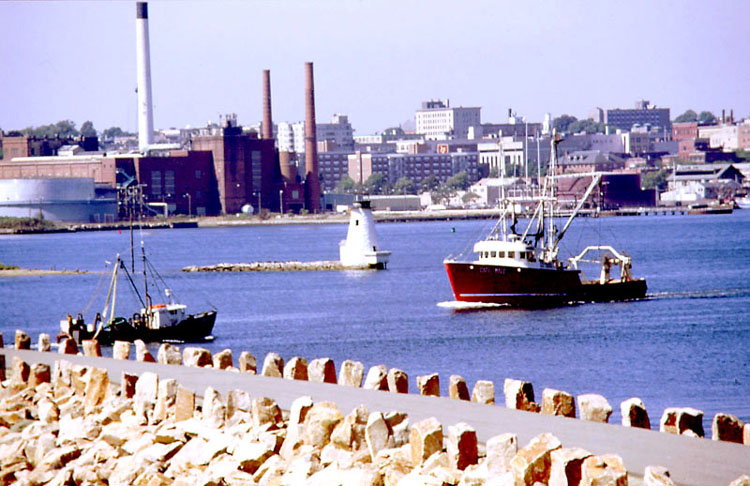
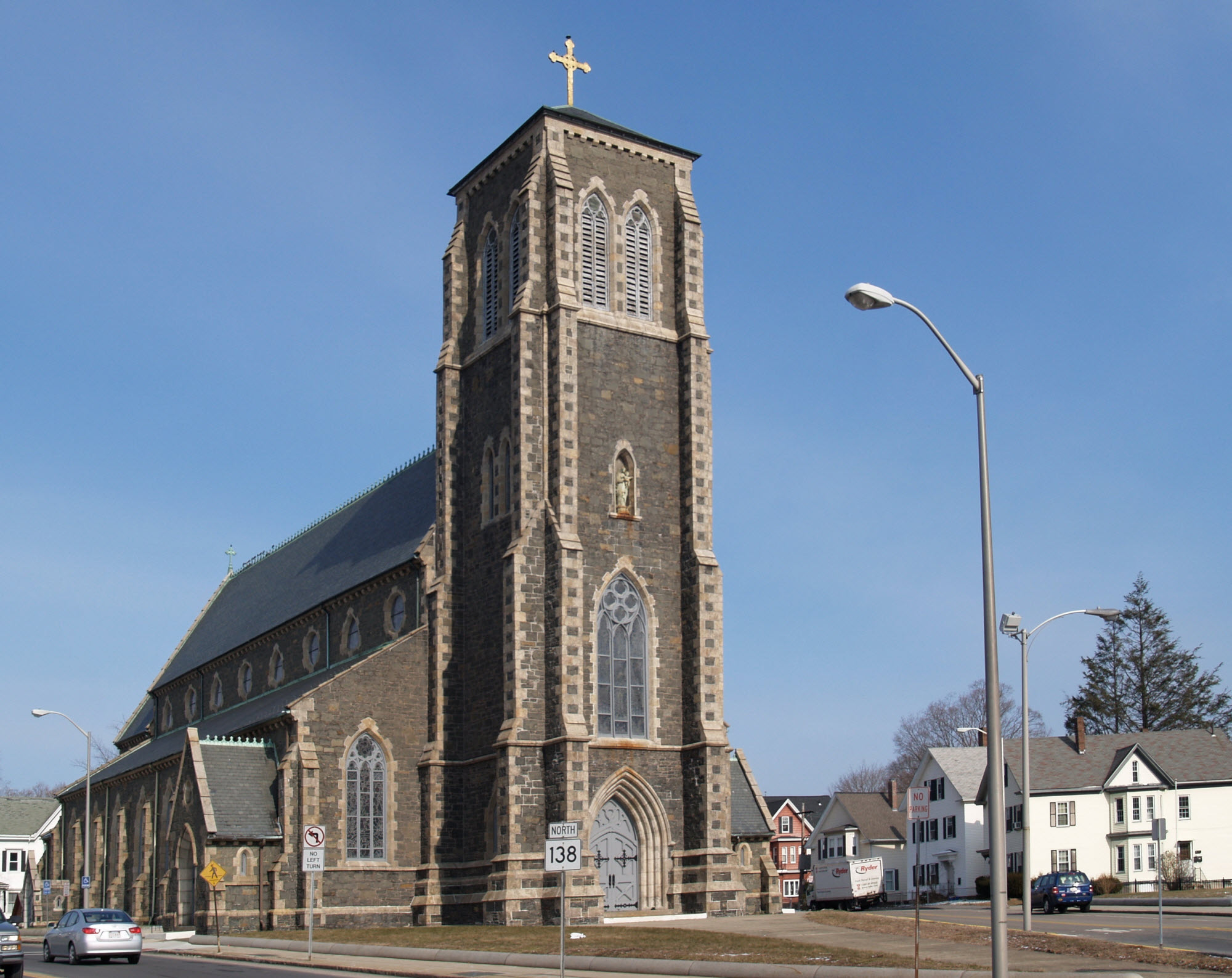
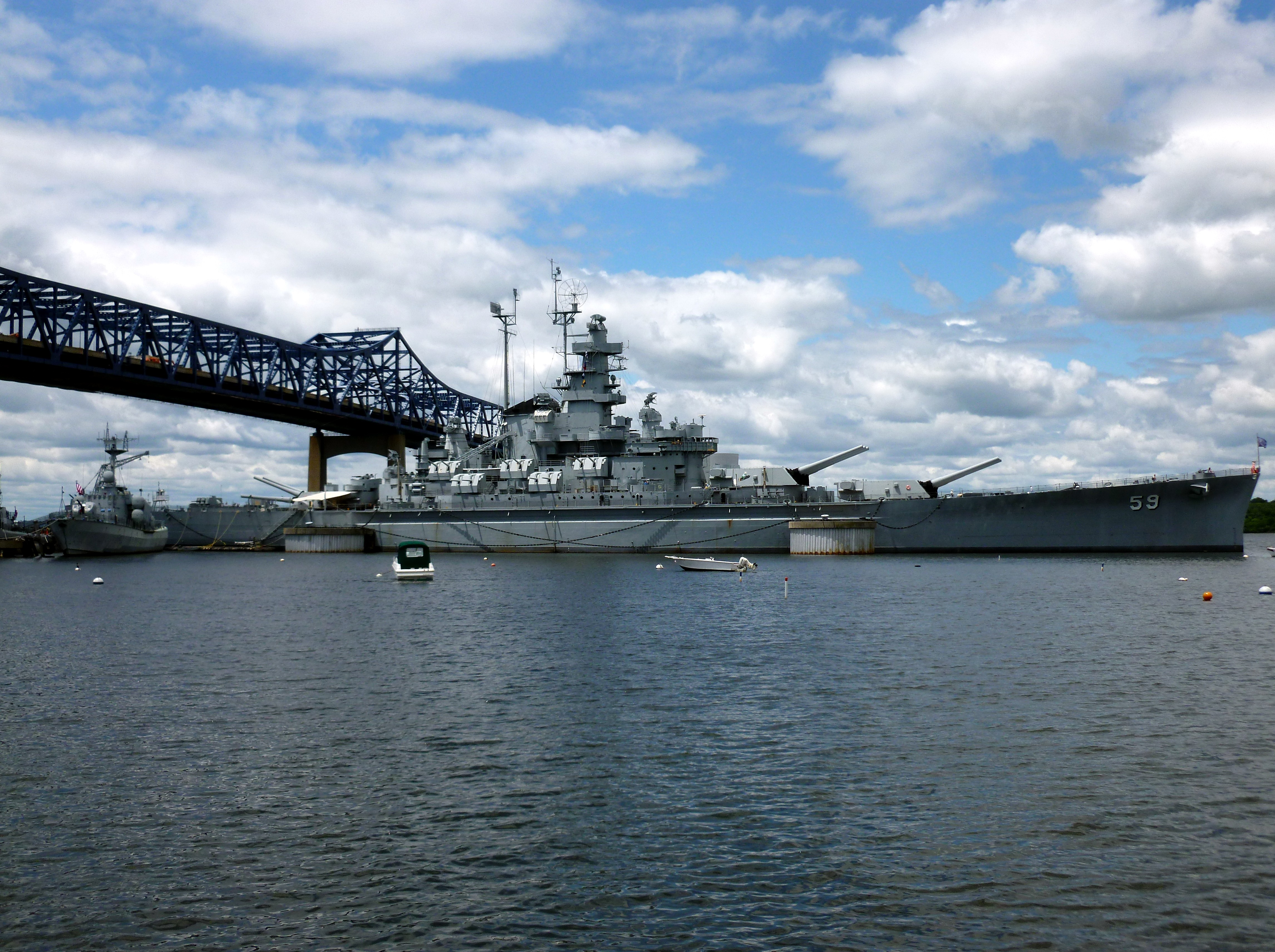
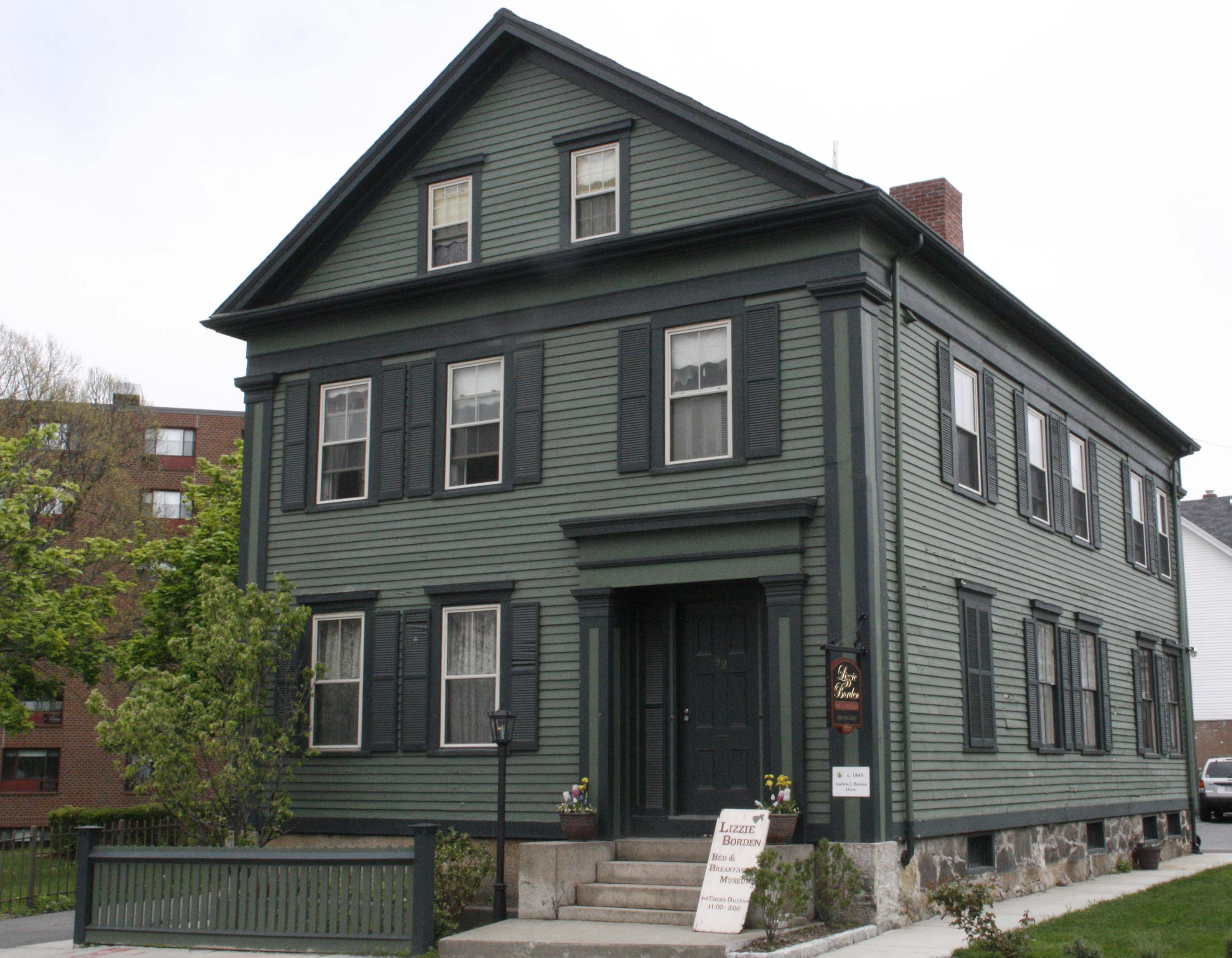
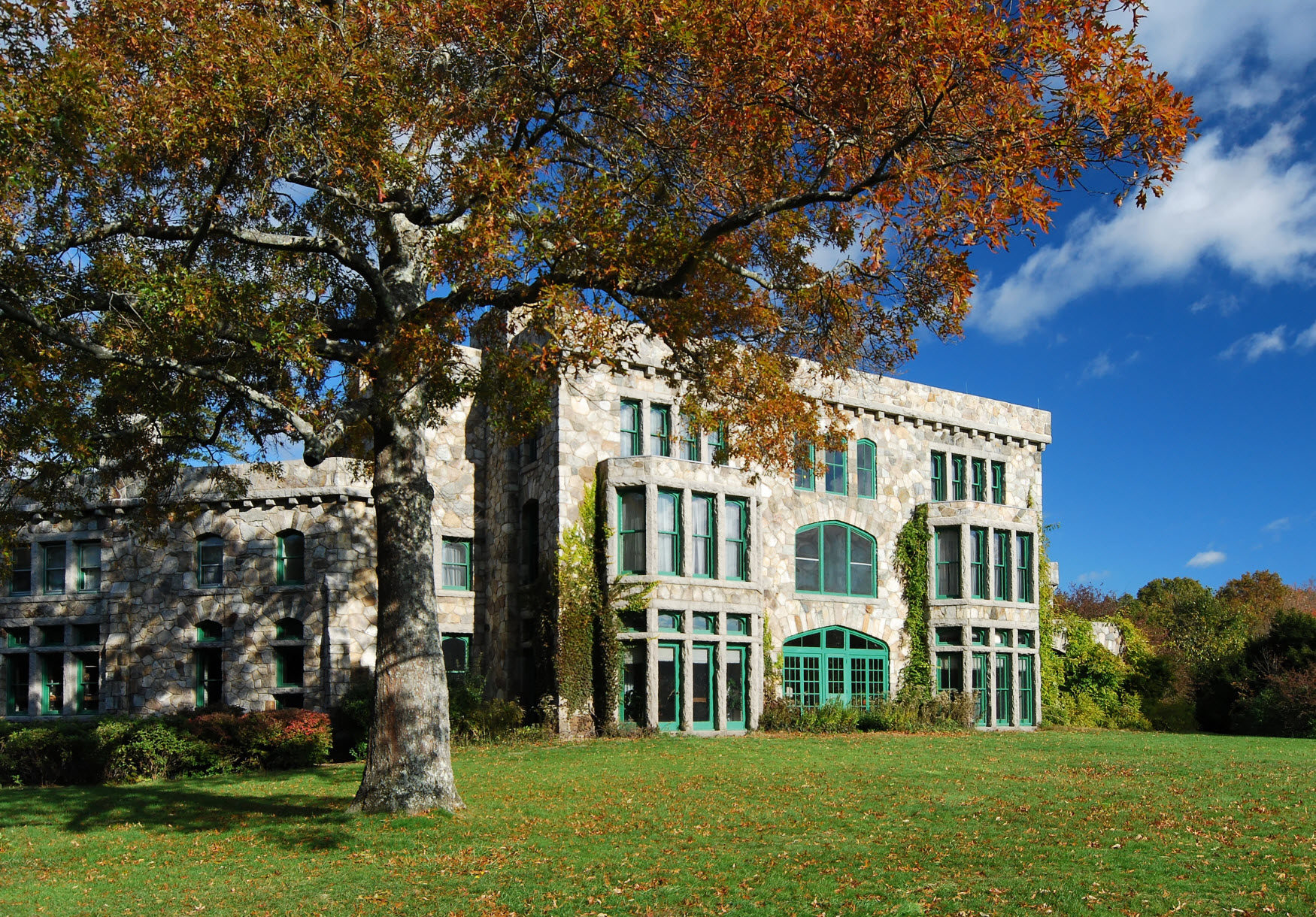
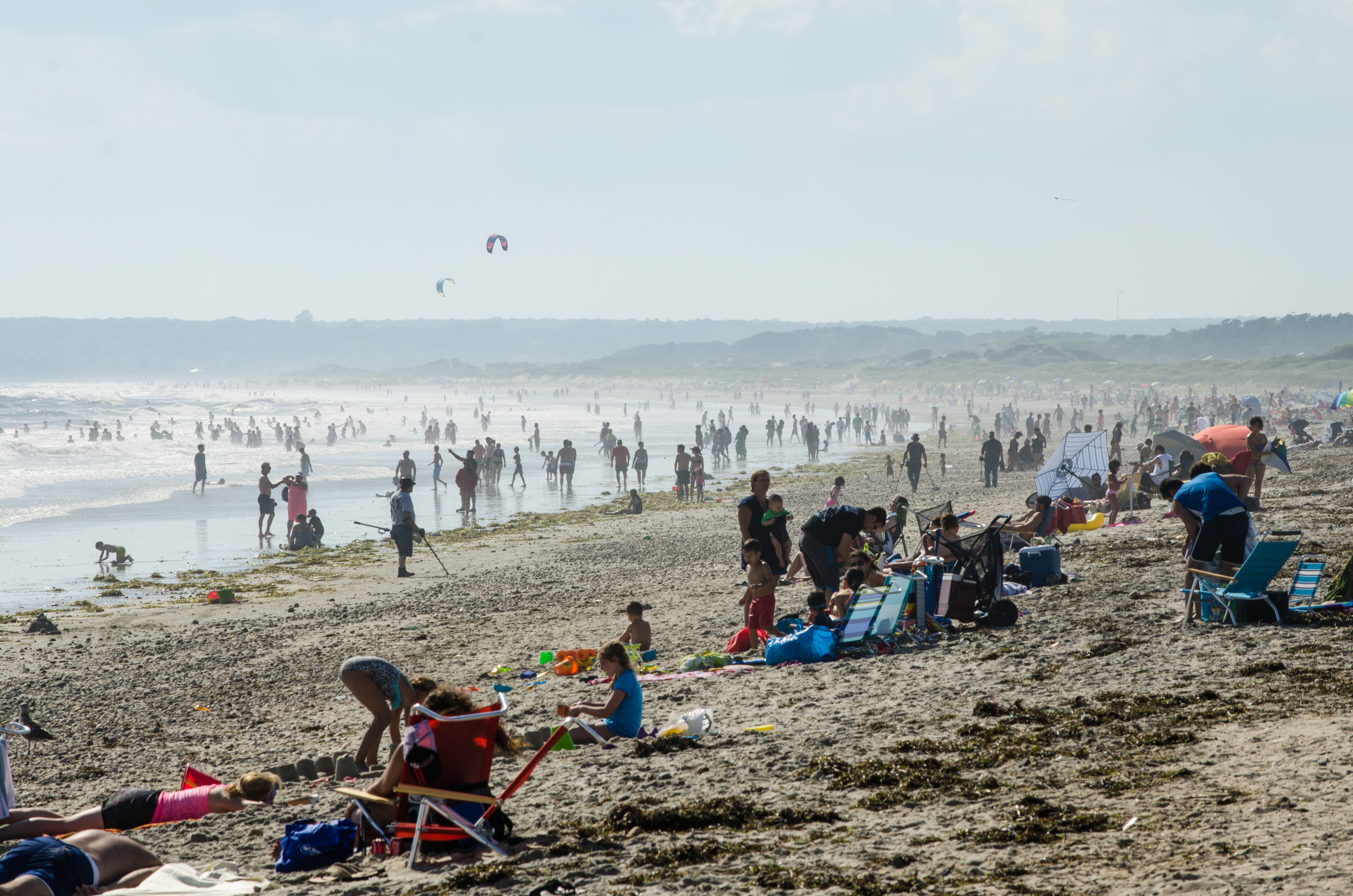
- New Bedford St. Mary's Complex Battleship Cove Lizzie Borden House Ames Mansion Horseneck Beach

- Seal

- Location within the U.S. state of Massachusetts
- Coordinates: 41.75°N 71.09°W
- Country: United States
- State: Massachusetts
- Founded: June 2, 1685 (from Plymouth Colony)
- Named for: Bristol, Rhode Island
- Seat: Taunton
- Largest city: New Bedford

Area
  - Total: 691 sq mi (1,790 km^{2})
  - Land: 553 sq mi (1,430 km^{2})
  - Water: 138 sq mi (360 km^{2}) 20%

Population (2020)
  - Total: 579,200
  - Estimate (2025): 593,640 ▲
  - Density: 1,050/sq mi (404/km^{2})
- Time zone: UTC−5 (Eastern)
  - Summer (DST): UTC−4 (EDT)
- Congressional districts: 4th, 8th, 9th
- Website: https://www.countyofbristol.net/

Bristol County is a county in the Commonwealth of Massachusetts, United States. As of the 2020 census, the population was 579,200. The shire town is Taunton. Some governmental functions are performed by the Commonwealth of Massachusetts, others by the county, and others by local towns and cities. The county is the sixth most populous county in Massachusetts. Bristol County is part of the Providence metropolitan area, which is also included in Greater Boston. The county is adjacent to the state of Rhode Island. It is geographically adjacent to the Massachusetts counties of Plymouth, Norfolk, and Dukes (via water), and the Rhode Island counties of Bristol, Newport, and Providence.

== History ==
Bristol County was created by the Plymouth Colony on June 2, 1685, and named after its "shire town" (county seat), Bristol. The Plymouth Colony, along with the Massachusetts Bay Colony, the Maine Colony and several other small settlements were rechartered in 1691, by King William III, to become The Province of Massachusetts Bay.

The towns of Bristol, Barrington, and Warren were awarded to Rhode Island in 1746 as part of the settlement of a long-running boundary dispute (see History of Massachusetts), forming Bristol County, Rhode Island. At the same time, Cumberland, Rhode Island was carved out of Attleborough, Massachusetts and annexed to Providence County, Rhode Island; Tiverton and Little Compton were transferred to Newport County, Rhode Island. East Freetown was officially purchased by Freetown, Massachusetts, from Tiverton in 1747, and so remained on the Massachusetts side.

After the departure of Bristol, Taunton was made the shire town of the county. A second county courthouse was constructed in 1828 in the growing town of New Bedford (designed a "half-shire town"). In 1862, a part of Seekonk (that portion of which is now East Providence, Rhode Island) and the entirety of East Pawtucket were transferred to Providence County, Rhode Island. At the same time, land ceded from Rhode Island was added to Fall River and Westport. The growing Fall River became the site of the third county courthouse in 1877.

== Geography ==
According to the U.S. Census Bureau, the county has a total area of 691 square miles (1,790 km^{2}), of which 553 square miles (1,430 km^{2}) is land and 138 square miles (360 km^{2}) (20%) is water. The highest point in Bristol County is Sunrise Hill (Watery Hill) at 390 feet (120 m) above sea level located in World War I Memorial Park in North Attleborough. It is also to note that Bristol, Plymouth and Taunton are all places in South West England. Their Massachusetts cousins were named after the originals as South West England was the focal point for sailing and discovery at the time of America's discovery. John Cabot set sail from Bristol and sailed down the Severn on which lies Newport in Wales.

=== Adjacent counties ===
- Norfolk County—north
- Plymouth County—east
- Newport County, Rhode Island—southwest
- Bristol County, Rhode Island—west
- Providence County, Rhode Island—northwest

To the south, Dukes County is opposite Buzzards Bay from Bristol County.

=== National protected area ===
- New Bedford Whaling National Historical Park

== Demographics ==
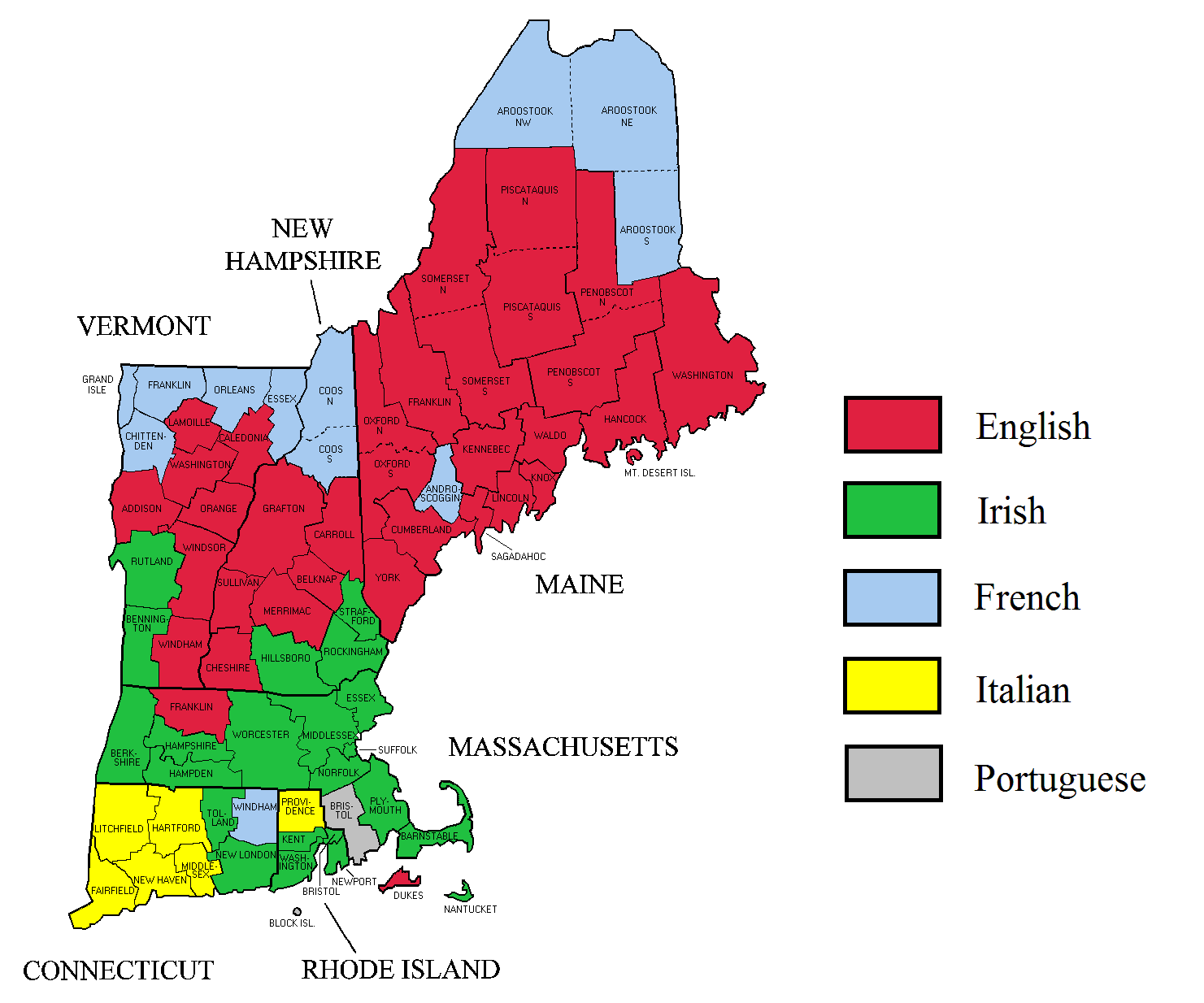
Largest self-reported ancestry groups in New England. Americans of Portuguese descent plurality shown in grey.

Historical population
Census	Pop.	Note	%±
1790	31,696		—
1800	33,880		6.9%
1810	37,168		9.7%
1820	40,908		10.1%
1830	49,592		21.2%
1840	60,164		21.3%
1850	76,192		26.6%
1860	93,794		23.1%
1870	102,886		9.7%
1880	139,040		35.1%
1890	186,465		34.1%
1900	252,029		35.2%
1910	318,573		26.4%
1920	359,005		12.7%
1930	364,590		1.6%
1940	364,637		0.0%
1950	381,569		4.6%
1960	398,488		4.4%
1970	444,301		11.5%
1980	474,641		6.8%
1990	506,325		6.7%
2000	534,678		5.6%
2010	548,285		2.5%
2020	579,200		5.6%
2025 (est.)	593,640	▲	2.5%
U.S. Decennial Census; 1790–1960 1900–1990; 1990–2000 2010–2020

=== 2020 census ===
As of the 2020 census, the county had a population of 579,200. Of the residents, 20.3% were under the age of 18 and 17.8% were 65 years of age or older; the median age was 41.5 years. For every 100 females there were 94.1 males, and for every 100 females age 18 and over there were 91.8 males. 89.6% of residents lived in urban areas and 10.4% lived in rural areas.

The racial makeup of the county was 78.7% White, 4.4% Black or African American, 0.4% American Indian and Alaska Native, 2.4% Asian, 0.0% Native Hawaiian and Pacific Islander, 5.3% from some other race, and 8.8% from two or more races. Hispanic or Latino residents of any race comprised 9.5% of the population.

There were 229,293 households in the county, of which 29.0% had children under the age of 18 living with them and 28.9% had a female householder with no spouse or partner present. About 28.6% of all households were made up of individuals and 12.2% had someone living alone who was 65 years of age or older.

There were 243,464 housing units, of which 5.8% were vacant. Among occupied housing units, 61.0% were owner-occupied and 39.0% were renter-occupied. The homeowner vacancy rate was 0.9% and the rental vacancy rate was 4.5%.

=== Racial and ethnic composition ===
Bristol County, Massachusetts – Racial and ethnic composition Note: the US Census treats Hispanic/Latino as an ethnic category. This table excludes Latinos from the racial categories and assigns them to a separate category. Hispanics/Latinos may be of any race.
Race / Ethnicity (NH = Non-Hispanic)	Pop 1980	Pop 1990	Pop 2000	Pop 2010	Pop 2020	% 1980	% 1990	% 2000	% 2010	% 2020
White alone (NH)	450,032	474,032	477,938	469,344	445,658	94.82%	93.62%	89.39%	85.60%	76.94%
Black or African American alone (NH)	4,606	7,203	9,788	15,736	23,123	0.97%	1.42%	1.83%	2.87%	3.99%
Native American or Alaska Native alone (NH)	598	861	1,028	1,089	938	0.13%	0.17%	0.19%	0.20%	0.16%
Asian alone (NH)	1,489	4,403	6,673	10,140	13,651	0.31%	0.87%	1.25%	1.85%	2.36%
Native Hawaiian or Pacific Islander alone (NH)	x	x	114	119	102	x	x	0.02%	0.02%	0.02%
Other race alone (NH)	7,481	6,248	9,081	7,206	8,730	1.58%	1.23%	1.70%	1.31%	1.51%
Mixed race or Multiracial (NH)	x	x	10,814	11,631	32,247	x	x	2.02%	2.12%	5.57%
Hispanic or Latino (any race)	10,435	13,578	19,242	33,020	54,751	2.20%	2.68%	3.60%	6.02%	9.45%
Total	474,641	506,325	534,678	548,285	579,200	100.00%	100.00%	100.00%	100.00%	100.00%

=== American Community Survey 2025 data ===
The United States Census Bureau estimated that in 2025, Bristol County’s population was 593.640. It was also estimated that the county's population was 74,73% Non-Hispanic White, 11,37% Hispanic or Latino, 7,89% Non-Hispanic Black, 2,80% Asian, 0,21% Native American, 0,05% Pacific Islander, and 2,95% Multiracial.

Total	Population	Percentage
Non-Hispanic White	443.647	74,73%
Hispanic or Latino	67.500	11,37%
Non-Hispanic Black	46.824	7,89%
Asian	16.596	2,80%
Native American	1.221	0,21%
Pacific Islander	319	0,05%
Non-Hispanic Multiracial	17.533	2,95%

=== 2010 census ===
At the 2010 census, there were 548,285 people, 213,010 households, and 141,338 families in the county. The population density was 991.3 inhabitants per square mile (382.7/km^{2}). There were 230,535 housing units at an average density of 416.8 per square mile (160.9/km^{2}). The racial makeup of the county was 88.4% white, 3.3% black, 1.9% Asian, 0.4% American Indian, 3.4% from other races, and 2.6% from two or more races. Those of Hispanic or Latino origin made up 6.0% of the population. The largest ancestry groups were:

- 30.1% Portuguese
- 19.2% Irish
- 13.1% French
- 12.5% English
- 9.3% Italian
- 5.7% French Canadian
- 5.0% German
- 4.5% Polish
- 3.4% Puerto Rican
- 3.3% Sub-Saharan African
- 2.5% American
- 2.0% Scottish
- 1.4% Swedish
- 1.3% Scotch-Irish
- 1.0% Arab

Of the 213,010 households, 32.6% had children under the age of 18 living with them, 47.5% were married couples living together, 14.0% had a female householder with no husband present, 33.6% were non-families, and 27.4% of households were made up of individuals. The average household size was 2.50 and the average family size was 3.06. The median age was 39.8 years.

The median household income was $54,955 and the median family income was $70,161. Males had a median income of $51,785 versus $39,714 for females. The per capita income for the county was $27,736. About 8.8% of families and 11.3% of the population were below the poverty line, including 15.7% of those under age 18 and 10.4% of those age 65 or over.

=== 2000 census ===
At the 2000 census there were 534,678 people, 205,411 households, and 140,706 families in the county. The population density was 962 inhabitants per square mile (371/km^{2}). There were 216,918 housing units at an average density of 390 per square mile (150/km^{2}). The racial makeup of the county was 90.98% White, 2.03% Black or African American, 0.24% Native American, 1.26% Asian, 0.03% Pacific Islander, 3.12% from other races, and 2.34% from two or more races. 3.60% was Hispanic or Latino of any race. 29.7% were of Portuguese, 13.0% Irish, 8.9% French, 8.2% English, 6.8% Italian and 6.4% French Canadian ancestry according to Census 2000. 79.1% spoke English, 13.9% Portuguese, 2.9% Spanish and 1.6% French as their first language. The United States Census Bureau reported Bristol County as being one of two counties in the United States with a plurality of people of Portuguese ancestry (the other being the contiguous Bristol County, Rhode Island).

Of the 205,411 households 33.00% had children under the age of 18 living with them, 51.60% were married couples living together, 13.00% had a female householder with no husband present, and 31.50% were non-families. Of all households 26.50% were one person and 11.00% were one person aged 65 or older. The average household size was 2.54 and the average family size was 3.08.

The age distribution was 24.60% under the age of 18, 8.50% from 18 to 24, 30.50% from 25 to 44, 22.20% from 45 to 64, and 14.10% 65 or older. The median age was 37 years. For every 100 females, there were 92.40 males. For every 100 females age 18 and over, there were 88.50 males.

The median household income was $43,496 and the median family income was $53,733. Males had a median income of $39,361 versus $27,516 for females. The per capita income for the county was $20,978. About 7.80% of families and 10.00% of the population were below the poverty line, including 13.00% of those under age 18 and 12.00% of that age 65 or over.

=== Income breakdown by town ===
The ranking of unincorporated communities that are included on the list are reflective if the census designated locations and villages were included as cities or towns. Data is from the 2007–2011 American Community Survey 5-Year Estimates.

Rank	Town		Per capita income	Median household income	Median family income	Population	Number of households
1	Mansfield	Town	$39,792	$98,182	$112,788	23,094	8,161
2	Easton	Town	$39,751	$89,714	$111,045	23,061	7,852
3	Rehoboth	Town	$38,415	$87,563	$97,711	11,470	4,093
4	Westport	Town	$35,337	$73,736	$83,289	15,396	5,867
	Massachusetts	State	$35,051	$65,981	$83,371	6,512,227	2,522,409
5	Raynham	Town	$34,904	$82,855	$96,190	13,208	4,739
6	North Attleborough	City	$34,374	$80,757	$94,469	28,593	10,426
7	Dighton	Town	$34,258	$85,284	$94,044	7,003	2,386
8	Swansea	Town	$33,910	$71,716	$79,486	15,886	6,173
	North Westport	CDP	$33,858	$67,614	$82,827	4,188	1,700
9	Seekonk	Town	$33,136	$78,032	$89,833	13,700	4,752
10	Freetown	Town	$32,437	$82,208	$93,773	8,828	3,150
11	Dartmouth	Town	$32,138	$73,007	$86,650	33,759	12,119
	Raynham Center	CDP	$32,034	$84,028	$91,154	4,619	1,563
	Mansfield Center	CDP	$31,762	$71,685	$98,902	7,946	3,022
12	Somerset	Town	$31,718	$69,449	$80,795	18,172	6,983
13	Norton	Town	$30,772	$75,538	$91,636	18,970	6,297
	North Seekonk	CDP	$30,705	$65,804	$81,111	2,552	941
14	Attleboro	City	$30,398	$65,298	$76,563	43,459	16,393
	Smith Mills	CDP	$30,207	$67,907	$79,123	5,030	1,965
15	Acushnet	Town	$30,084	$64,695	$81,643	10,299	3,818
	Bliss Corner	CDP	$29,569	$52,285	$63,554	6,063	2,534
	Bristol County	County	$28,682	$55,813	$71,416	547,305	210,536
16	Fairhaven	Town	$28,658	$60,179	$77,089	15,915	6,444
17	Berkley	Town	$28,206	$81,094	$83,228	6,336	1,970
	United States	Country	$27,915	$52,762	$64,293	306,603,772	114,761,359
18	Taunton	City	$26,309	$53,401	$67,447	55,930	21,799
	Acushnet Center	CDP	$26,295	$51,782	$64,750	2,737	1,159
	Ocean Grove	CDP	$25,058	$60,267	$72,594	3,098	1,230
19	New Bedford	City	$21,558	$37,493	$46,881	95,006	38,869
20	Fall River	City	$21,118	$34,789	$44,635	89,220	38,245
	Norton Center	CDP	$16,578	$83,465	$84,781	2,977	446

== Politics and government ==
Bristol County has voted for the presidential nominee of the Democratic Party in every election since 1960 and, with the exception of Dwight D. Eisenhower's victorious campaigns of 1952 and 1956, for the Democratic nominee since 1928, before which it was a Republican stronghold.

However, in 2024, Republican Donald Trump came the closest to winning the county since 1984 (when Ronald Reagan came within less than 800 votes of winning), with Democrat Kamala Harris winning only 49.6% of the vote. It was also the closest any Massachusetts county came to flipping Republican since 1988, as all counties have been won by the Democratic candidate since 1992.

United States presidential election results for Bristol County, Massachusetts
Year	Republican / Whig		Democratic		Third party(ies)	
Year	No.	%	No.	%	No.	%
1804	1,729	60.33%	1,137	39.67%	0	0.00%
1812	3,189	69.74%	1,384	30.26%	0	0.00%
1820	2,394	69.51%	1,050	30.49%	0	0.00%
1824	2,065	86.73%	316	13.27%	0	0.00%
1828	1,740	84.26%	325	15.74%	0	0.00%
1832	1,194	29.46%	499	12.31%	2,360	58.23%
1836	1,732	40.28%	2,568	59.72%	0	0.00%
1840	4,855	49.16%	4,904	49.66%	117	1.18%
1844	4,872	46.76%	4,903	47.06%	644	6.18%
1848	4,841	49.18%	2,170	22.05%	2,832	28.77%
1852	3,827	41.61%	3,269	35.54%	2,102	22.85%
1856	8,845	72.23%	2,465	20.13%	936	7.64%
1860	7,980	73.78%	1,713	15.84%	1,123	10.38%
1864	9,736	81.75%	2,173	18.25%	0	0.00%
1868	10,125	78.80%	2,724	21.20%	0	0.00%
1872	10,003	79.34%	2,605	20.66%	0	0.00%
1876	11,578	66.43%	5,814	33.36%	38	0.22%
1880	13,418	67.51%	6,136	30.87%	323	1.62%
1884	12,291	60.03%	6,475	31.62%	1,710	8.35%
1888	14,570	60.39%	8,972	37.19%	584	2.42%
1892	15,732	57.72%	10,825	39.72%	699	2.56%
1896	21,629	76.06%	6,022	21.18%	784	2.76%
1900	19,396	64.77%	9,355	31.24%	1,196	3.99%
1904	18,742	60.00%	11,103	35.55%	1,390	4.45%
1908	20,683	60.58%	10,719	31.39%	2,742	8.03%
1912	13,279	34.98%	12,420	32.72%	12,264	32.31%
1916	22,578	53.69%	18,065	42.96%	1,407	3.35%
1920	56,734	73.65%	17,719	23.00%	2,579	3.35%
1924	58,929	66.23%	19,802	22.25%	10,249	11.52%
1928	55,205	47.69%	59,257	51.19%	1,293	1.12%
1932	50,846	43.58%	62,474	53.55%	3,355	2.88%
1936	49,754	35.25%	80,805	57.25%	10,586	7.50%
1940	60,143	37.97%	97,571	61.60%	677	0.43%
1944	60,880	40.13%	90,529	59.68%	283	0.19%
1948	63,216	36.64%	106,741	61.86%	2,594	1.50%
1952	98,105	51.09%	93,444	48.67%	462	0.24%
1956	109,542	57.85%	79,357	41.91%	466	0.25%
1960	64,290	33.02%	130,049	66.79%	383	0.20%
1964	39,230	21.02%	146,885	78.70%	521	0.28%
1968	56,672	30.87%	119,439	65.06%	7,458	4.06%
1972	84,390	44.71%	103,163	54.65%	1,215	0.64%
1976	69,957	36.48%	116,318	60.65%	5,496	2.87%
1980	77,545	41.12%	83,460	44.25%	27,600	14.63%
1984	93,232	49.58%	94,010	49.99%	797	0.42%
1988	83,797	43.30%	107,854	55.73%	1,879	0.97%
1992	52,370	24.73%	102,406	48.36%	56,978	26.91%
1996	47,164	23.79%	127,725	64.44%	23,324	11.77%
2000	62,848	29.74%	136,325	64.51%	12,164	5.76%
2004	82,524	35.44%	147,854	63.49%	2,500	1.07%
2008	90,531	37.24%	146,861	60.41%	5,728	2.36%
2012	93,898	38.88%	143,433	59.39%	4,178	1.73%
2016	105,443	41.82%	129,540	51.38%	17,157	6.80%
2020	119,872	42.92%	153,377	54.92%	6,030	2.16%
2024	134,196	48.27%	137,786	49.56%	6,035	2.17%

Gubernatorial elections results

Gubernatorial elections results
Year	Republican	Democratic	Third parties
2022	44.19% 81,033	53.97% 98,969	1.84% 3,388
2018	70.76% 132,371	29.02% 54,280	0.23% 423
2014	49.70% 72,641	45.19% 66,045	5.11% 7,471
2010	42.66% 73,220	47.23% 81,059	10.11% 17,340
2006	34.32% 57,233	57.33% 95,623	8.36% 13,925
2002	44.99% 71,189	50.73% 80,275	4.28% 6,779

- Paul B. Kitchen—County Commissioner
- John R. Mitchell—County Commissioner
- John T. Saunders—County Commissioner
- Thomas M. Quinn, III—District Attorney
- Paul Heroux—Sheriff
- Christopher T. Saunders—County Treasurer
- Barry Amaral—Register of Deeds, Northern District
- Bernard McDonald—Register of Deeds, Fall River District
- Frederick M. Kalisz—Register of Deeds, Southern District
- Marc Santos—Clerk of Courts

The Bristol County Sheriff's Office maintains its administrative headquarters and operates several jail facilities in the Dartmouth Complex in North Dartmouth in Dartmouth. Jail facilities in the Dartmouth Complex include the Bristol County House Of Correction and Jail, the Bristol County Sheriff's Office Women's Center, and the C. Carlos Carreiro Immigration Detention Center. The office also operates the Ash Street Jail and Regional Lock-Up and the Juvenile Secure Alternative Lock Up Program (JALP) in New Bedford.

The Bristol County House Of Correction and Jail has room for 1,100 prisoners. It houses men convicted of crimes who have been sentenced to 2 1/2 years or less. It also houses high-security male pre-trial prisoners, high-security female prisoners, and pre-trial female prisoners.

The women's center, a medium security jail, can house up to 106 women. The self-contained women's center had opened as a minimum security pre-release center for male prisoners in 1990 which could house up to 106 prisoners. When it was a pre-release facility it only housed an average of 60 prisoners because the county sheriff imposed strict conditions upon the pre-release program. In 1999 the sheriff received a federal grant to convert the pre-release center into a women's center, and he moved the pre-release program to modular units at the main jail.

The Carreiro jail houses detained individuals who are scheduled for deportation and individuals who are engaging in proceedings with the Immigration and Customs Enforcement (ICE). The Ash Street jail houses over 200 pre-trial prisoners and a few sentenced inmate workers for the system. JALP houses up to 12 pre-arraingment juvenile prisoners.

=== Voter registration ===
Voter registration and party enrollment as of February 2024
Unenrolled	280,908	66.61%
Democratic	95,921	22.75%
Republican	39,270	9.31%
Libertarian	1,810	0.43%
Other parties	3,795	0.9%
Total	421,704	100%

=== Twin town ===
The county is twinned with the municipality of Lagoa in the Azores.

== Transportation ==
Transportation authorities providing public bus service include the Greater Attleboro Taunton Regional Transit Authority; and the Southeastern Regional Transit Authority serving the Fall River and New Bedford areas.

Airports include the Mansfield Municipal Airport, Myricks Airport, New Bedford Municipal Airport and Taunton Municipal Airport; of these, the New Bedford airport is a commercial airport, with flights serving the Cape Cod, Nantucket and Martha's Vineyard area.

The Providence/Stoughton Line of the MBTA commuter rail has stops in Mansfield, Attleboro, and South Attleboro. The line provides connections to Providence and Boston (at Back Bay Station and South Station), as well as intermediate stops. An extension has been completed that connects to T. F. Green Airport.

The Fall River/New Bedford Line also runs through Bristol County. With stops at East Taunton station, Freetown station, Fall River Depot, Church Street Station and New Bedford station.

=== Major highways ===
- I-95
- I-195
- I-295
- I-495
- US 1
- US 6
- US 44
- Route 1A
- Route 18
- Route 24
- Route 79
- Route 81
- Route 88
- Route 103
- Route 104
- Route 105
- Route 106
- Route 114A
- Route 118
- Route 120
- Route 123
- Route 136
- Route 138
- Route 140
- Route 152
- Route 177
- Route 240

== Communities ==
Bristol County Superior Courthouse in Taunton.

An 1851 map of Bristol County, Massachusetts

=== Cities ===
- Attleboro
- Fall River
- New Bedford
- Taunton (county seat)

=== Towns ===
- Acushnet
- Berkley
- Dartmouth
- Dighton
- Easton
- Fairhaven
- Freetown
- Mansfield
- North Attleborough
- Norton
- Raynham
- Rehoboth
- Seekonk
- Somerset
- Swansea
- Westport

=== Census-designated places ===
- Acushnet Center
- Bliss Corner
- Mansfield Center
- North Seekonk
- North Westport
- Norton Center
- Ocean Grove
- Raynham Center
- Smith Mills

=== Other villages ===
- Assonet
- Attleboro Falls
- Bowensville
- Britannia
- East Freetown
- East Taunton
- Fall River Station
- Five Corners
- Flint Village
- Four Corners
- Globe Village
- Gushee Pond
- Highlands
- Hixville
- Hornbine
- Hortonville
- Kingmans Corner
- Myricks
- North Attleborough Center
- North Raynham
- North Rehoboth
- North Taunton
- Oakland
- Padanaram
- Pecks Corner
- Perrys Corner
- Perryville
- Pleasantfield
- Pleasant Street
- Pottersville
- Prattville
- Ramblewood
- Rehoboth
- Sassaquin
- South Attleboro
- South Rehoboth
- Squawbetty
- Steep Brook
- Titicut
- Tracy Corner
- Wade's Corner
- Weir Village
- Westville
- Whittenton
- Whittenton Junction

=== Ghost town ===
- Norton Furnace

== Education ==
School districts include:

K–12:

- Attleboro School District
- Bridgewater-Raynham School District
- Dartmouth School District
- Dighton-Rehoboth School District
- Easton School District
- Fairhaven School District - Takes Acushnet for secondary school
- Fall River School District
- Freetown-Lakeville School District
- Mansfield School District
- New Bedford School District - Takes Acushnet for secondary school
- North Attleborough School District
- Norton School District
- Seekonk School District
- Swansea School District
- Taunton School District
- Westport School District

Secondary:

- Somerset-Berkley School District

Elementary:

- Acushnet School District
- Berkley School District
- Somerset School District

Greater New Bedford Regional Vocational-Technical High School is also in the county.

University of Massachusetts Dartmouth and Stonehill College are in the county.

== See also ==
- Administrative divisions of Massachusetts
- Registry of Deeds (Massachusetts)
- Bristol Community College
- Horseneck Beach State Reservation
- Freetown-Fall River State Forest
- National Register of Historic Places listings in Bristol County, Massachusetts
- Southern New England School of Law
- Taunton River
- Taunton River Watershed
- University of Massachusetts Dartmouth
- Wheaton College
