= Mansfield Center =

Mansfield Center can refer to a community in the United States:

- Mansfield Center, Connecticut
- Mansfield Center, Massachusetts
