= Gideon Nye =

American diplomat

Gideon Nye Jr. (1812 – January 25, 1888) was an American diplomat, art collector, writer and merchant in the East Indian and China trade, known both for his art collection and for his books on China.

He was born in Fairhaven (now Acushnet), Massachusetts, in 1812.

== Career ==
Nye went to China in 1831, where he worked for various companies in the East Indian and Chinese trade. In 1843 he opened the House of Nye, Parkin & Co. In 1851 the firm name changed its name to Nye Brothers & Co. and operated until 1856. In this time period, it was also known as Bull, Nye, & Co. due to the brief involvement of Isaac Bull. Nye Brothers suffered a collapse in 1856 after over-investing during a down market.

== Family ==
Nye was a descendant of Benjamin Nye, who settled in Sandwich, Mass., in 1637. He was an eldest child. His father, Gideon Nye, was born in 1786 and died in 1875. His mother, Sylvia S. Hathaway, was born in 1790, and died in 1883. Mr Nye was married in 1846, to Mary E. Washburn, who died in New York in 1870. Their only child was a daughter, born in Paris in 1846, Ellen E. Washburn.

== Residence in Canton ==
Nye was a merchant in China for over fifty years and the American Vice Consul at Canton (now Guangzhou) for the last ten years of his life. He was a scholarly man with a reputation for integrity, active as a Vice President of the Medical Missionary Society, and as a corresponding member of the American Geographical Society. He was known as one of the oldest foreign residents of Canton, having spent 55 years in that city since his arrival in 1831. He died in the city on January 25, 1888 and afterwards "the flags of the consulates, custom house and foreign ships in port were at half mast two days in token of public esteem and sorrow."

== Art collection ==
Nye purchased a large collection of valuable paintings in England between 1845–1850, which were exhibited in New York. Attempts were made to keep his collection intact, but it was dispersed to locations such as the Metropolitan Museum of Art. The paintings were considered important American artistic treasures of the time.

== Books and writings on the Opium Wars ==
Nye published many books and pamphlets as an eyewitness to the events which led up to the First Opium War, based on his acquaintance with both Chinese people and foreigners living in China.

- Nye, Gideon (1873). The morning of my life in China, comprising an outline of the history of foreign intercourse from the last year of the regime of honorable East India Company, 1833, to the imprisonment of the foreign community in 1839. Canton: [s.n., Internet Archive]. "gideon nye."
- Nye, Gideon (1873). The morning of my life in China ... Canton: [s.n., Internet Archive]. OCLC 263177675.
- Nye, Gideon (1850). Tea: and the tea trade Parts first and second. New York: Printed by G.W. Wood. OCLC 262465848.
- Nye, Gideon (1857). The rationale of the China question: comprising an inquiry into the repressive policy of the Imperial Government, with considerations of the duties of the three treaty powers, England, France, & America, in regard to it;- and a glance at the origins of the first and second wars with China, with incidental notices of the rebellion. By an American. 3rd ed. Macao.
- Nye, Gideon (1873). Peking the goal, --the sole hope of peace. Comprising an inquiry into the origin of the pretension of universal supremacy by China and into the causes of the first war: with incidents of the imprisonment of the foreign community and of the first campaign of Canton. 1841. Canton.
- Nye, Gideon (1875). The opium question and the Northern campaigns: including notices of some strictures by reviewers of the former; and indications of the salient points of the latter, down to the Treaty of Nanking. Canton.
