= Smith Mills, Massachusetts =

- Census-designated place
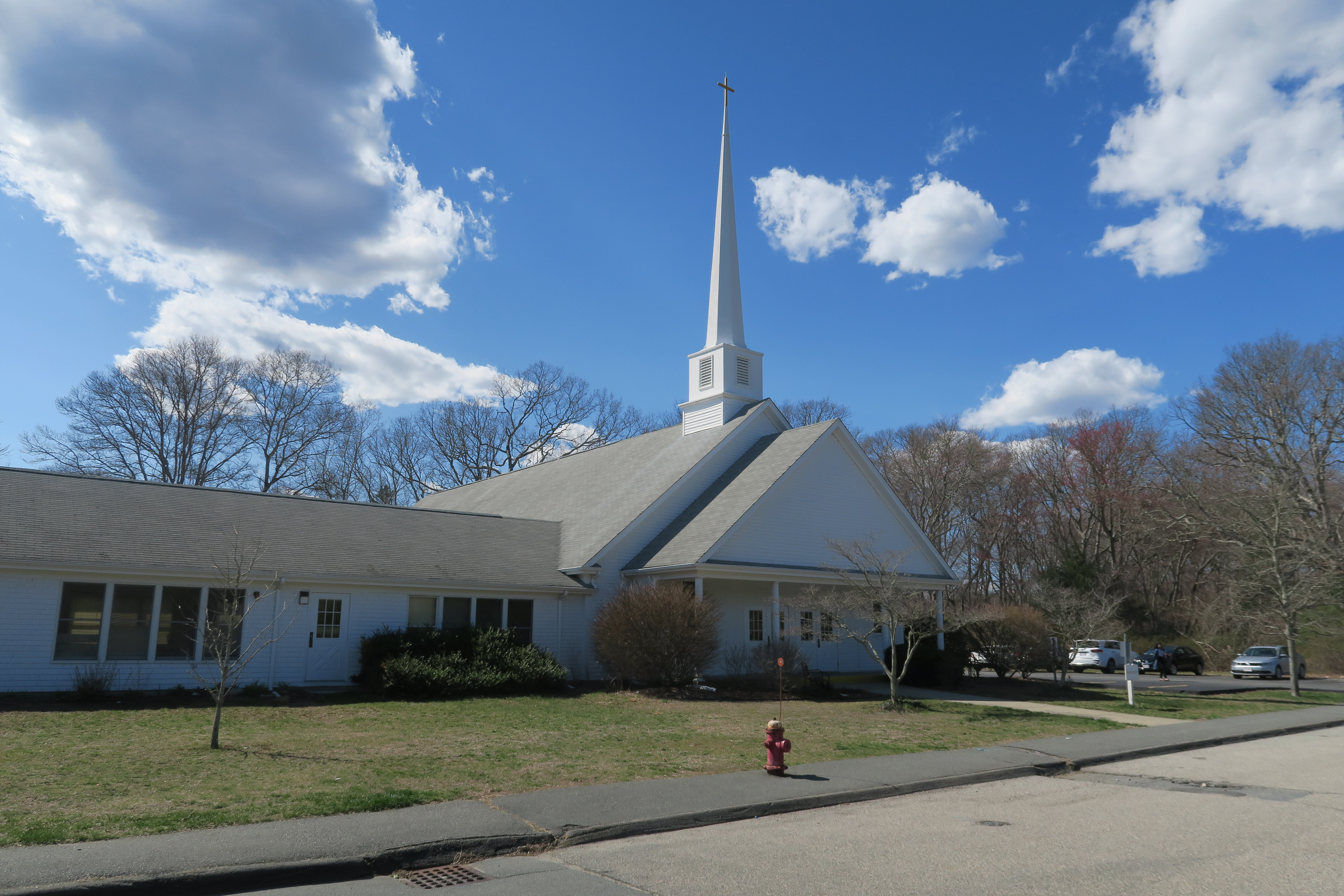
- Smith Mills Congregational Church

- Location in Bristol County in Massachusetts
- Coordinates: 41°38′23″N 70°59′4″W
- Country: United States
- State: Massachusetts
- County: Bristol
- Town: Dartmouth

Area
  - Total: 4.75 sq mi (12.30 km^{2})
  - Land: 4.67 sq mi (12.09 km^{2})
  - Water: 0.081 sq mi (0.21 km^{2})
- Elevation: 69 ft (21 m)

Population (2020)
  - Total: 4,832
  - Density: 1,035.2/sq mi (399.68/km^{2})
- Time zone: UTC-5 (Eastern (EST))
  - Summer (DST): UTC-4 (EDT)
- ZIP Code: 02747 (North Dartmouth)
- FIPS code: 25-62300
- GNIS feature ID: 0613755

Smith Mills is a census-designated place (CDP) in the town of Dartmouth in Bristol County, Massachusetts, United States. As of the 2020 census, Smith Mills had a population of 4,832.

== Geography ==
Smith Mills is located at 41°38′23″N 70°59′4″W (41.639807, -70.984491).

According to the United States Census Bureau, the CDP has a total area of 12.4 km^{2} (4.8 mi^{2}), of which 12.3 km^{2} (4.7 mi^{2}) is land and 0.2 km^{2} (0.1 mi^{2}) (1.46%) is water.

== Demographics ==
Historical population
Census	Pop.	Note	%±
1990	4,593		—
2000	4,432		−3.5%
2010	4,760		7.4%
2020	4,832		1.5%
U.S. Decennial Census

=== Racial and ethnic composition ===
Smith Mills CDP, Massachusetts – Racial composition Note: the US Census treats Hispanic/Latino as an ethnic category. This table excludes Latinos from the racial categories and assigns them to a separate category. Hispanics/Latinos may be of any race.
Race (NH = Non-Hispanic)	% 2020	% 2010	% 2000	Pop 2020	Pop 2010	Pop 2000
White alone (NH)	86.6%	90.9%	94.8%	4,186	4,325	4,201
Black alone (NH)	0.9%	1.2%	0.2%	45	58	9
American Indian alone (NH)	0.1%	0.2%	0.3%	3	8	12
Asian alone (NH)	3%	2.5%	1.1%	143	119	47
Pacific Islander alone (NH)	0%	0.1%	0%	0	3	2
Other race alone (NH)	1.2%	1.3%	0.9%	60	60	40
Multiracial (NH)	5.2%	1.8%	1.4%	252	85	62
Hispanic/Latino (any race)	3%	2.1%	1.3%	143	102	59

=== 2020 census ===
As of the 2020 census, Smith Mills had a population of 4,832. The median age was 46.5 years. 20.1% of residents were under the age of 18 and 23.7% of residents were 65 years of age or older. For every 100 females there were 88.7 males, and for every 100 females age 18 and over there were 87.1 males age 18 and over.

98.3% of residents lived in urban areas, while 1.7% lived in rural areas.

There were 1,905 households in Smith Mills, of which 29.2% had children under the age of 18 living in them. Of all households, 47.9% were married-couple households, 13.6% were households with a male householder and no spouse or partner present, and 30.9% were households with a female householder and no spouse or partner present. About 26.6% of all households were made up of individuals and 14.2% had someone living alone who was 65 years of age or older.

There were 2,054 housing units, of which 7.3% were vacant. The homeowner vacancy rate was 1.3% and the rental vacancy rate was 7.1%.

The most reported ancestries in 2020 were:

- Portuguese (37.9%)
- English (17.2%)
- Irish (15.9%)
- French (12.6%)
- Polish (5.5%)
- Italian (5.2%)
- German (4.2%)
- French Canadian (2.1%)
- Scottish (2%)
- Cabo Verdean (1.8%)

=== 2000 census ===
As of the census of 2000, there were 4,432 people, 1,861 households, and 1,269 families residing in the CDP. The population density was 361.8/km^{2} (936.9/mi^{2}). There were 1,931 housing units at an average density of 157.6/km^{2} (408.2/mi^{2}). The racial makeup of the CDP was 95.62% White, 0.27% African American, 0.27% Native American, 1.06% Asian, 0.05% Pacific Islander, 1.31% from other races, and 1.42% from two or more races. Hispanic or Latino of any race were 1.33% of the population.

There were 1,861 households, out of which 27.2% had children under the age of 18 living with them, 49.9% were married couples living together, 15.3% had a female householder with no husband present, and 31.8% were non-families. 27.4% of all households were made up of individuals, and 16.7% had someone living alone who was 65 years of age or older. The average household size was 2.37 and the average family size was 2.87.

In the CDP, the population was spread out, with 21.0% under the age of 18, 7.4% from 18 to 24, 24.3% from 25 to 44, 25.2% from 45 to 64, and 22.1% who were 65 years of age or older. The median age was 43 years. For every 100 females, there were 85.3 males. For every 100 females age 18 and over, there were 79.5 males.

The median income for a household in the CDP was $41,272, and the median income for a family was $50,558. Males had a median income of $40,558 versus $25,788 for females. The per capita income for the CDP was $20,820. About 6.6% of families and 6.4% of the population were below the poverty line, including 7.9% of those under age 18 and 3.3% of those age 65 or over.
