= Norton Center, Massachusetts =

- Census-designated place
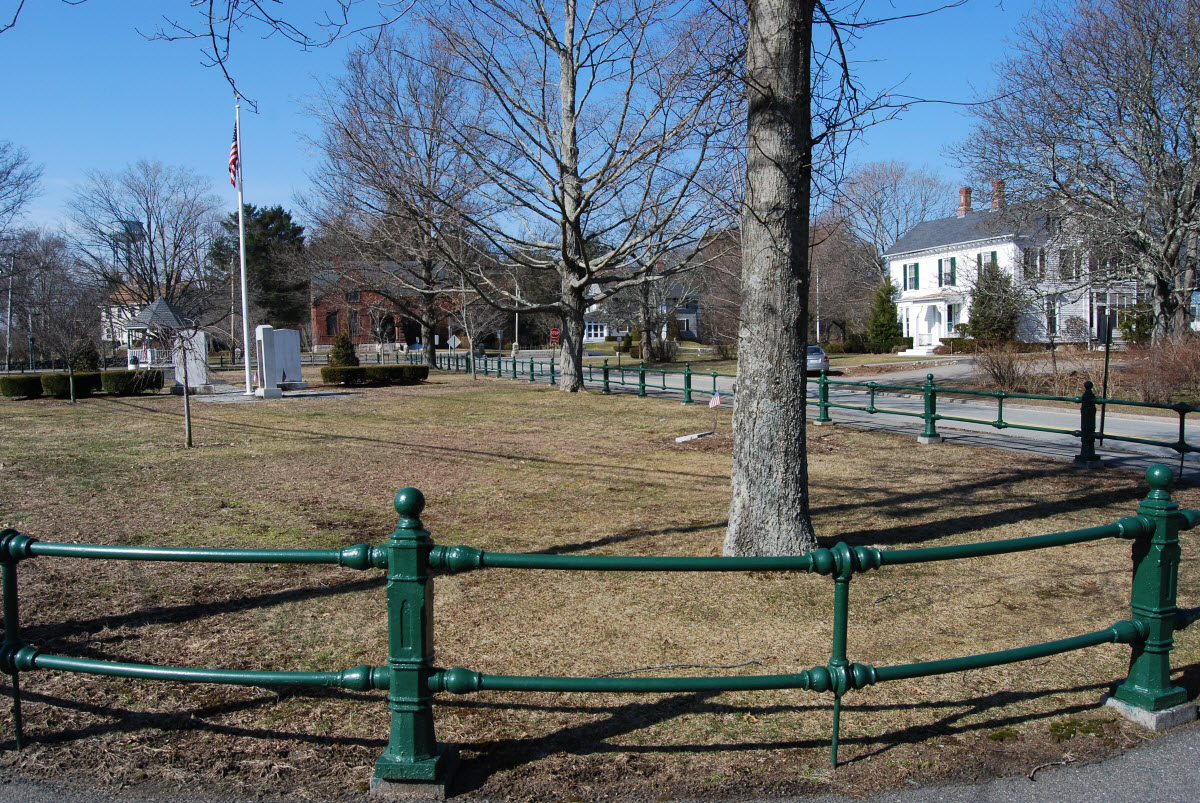
- Norton Town Common

- Location in Bristol County in Massachusetts
- Coordinates: 41°58′11″N 71°11′1″W
- Country: United States
- State: Massachusetts
- County: Bristol
- Town: Norton

Area
  - Total: 1.80 sq mi (4.67 km^{2})
  - Land: 1.69 sq mi (4.39 km^{2})
  - Water: 0.10 sq mi (0.27 km^{2})

Population (2020)
  - Total: 2,677
  - Density: 1,578/sq mi (609.1/km^{2})
- Time zone: UTC-5 (Eastern (EST))
  - Summer (DST): UTC-4 (EDT)
- ZIP Code: 02766 (Norton)
- FIPS code: 25-50005

Norton Center is a census-designated place (CDP) in the town of Norton, Massachusetts, United States. As of the 2020 census, Norton Center had a population of 2,677.

== Geography ==
Norton Center is located at 41°58′11″N 71°11′1″W (41.969851, -71.183657).

According to the United States Census Bureau, the CDP has a total area of 4.7 km^{2} (1.8 sq mi), all land.

== Demographics ==
Historical population
| Census | Pop. | Note | %± |
|---|---|---|---|
| 2020 | 2,677 | | — |
U.S. Decennial Census

=== 2020 census ===
As of the 2020 census, Norton Center had a population of 2,677. The median age was 21.8 years. 8.4% of residents were under the age of 18 and 7.4% of residents were 65 years of age or older. For every 100 females there were 90.1 males, and for every 100 females age 18 and over there were 89.2 males age 18 and over.

100.0% of residents lived in urban areas, while 0.0% lived in rural areas.

There were 433 households in Norton Center, of which 26.6% had children under the age of 18 living in them. Of all households, 58.2% were married-couple households, 14.1% were households with a male householder and no spouse or partner present, and 21.9% were households with a female householder and no spouse or partner present. About 24.9% of all households were made up of individuals and 12.3% had someone living alone who was 65 years of age or older.

There were 463 housing units, of which 6.5% were vacant. The homeowner vacancy rate was 0.5% and the rental vacancy rate was 13.1%.

Racial composition as of the 2020 census
| Race | Number | Percent |
|---|---|---|
| White | 2,234 | 83.5% |
| Black or African American | 132 | 4.9% |
| American Indian and Alaska Native | 3 | 0.1% |
| Asian | 156 | 5.8% |
| Native Hawaiian and Other Pacific Islander | 0 | 0.0% |
| Some other race | 59 | 2.2% |
| Two or more races | 93 | 3.5% |
| Hispanic or Latino (of any race) | 139 | 5.2% |

=== 2000 census ===
As of the census of 2000, there were 2,618 people, 436 households, and 312 families residing in the CDP. The population density was 555.4 people /km^{2} (1,438 people/mi^{2}). There were 442 housing units at an average density of 93.8 units /km^{2} (243 units/mi^{2}). The racial makeup of the CDP was 65.66% White, 1.57% African American, 0.27% Native American, 1.45% Asian, 29.37% from other races, and 1.68% from two or more races. Hispanic or Latino of any race were 3.48% of the population.

There were 436 households, out of which 36.0% had children under the age of 18 living with them, 59.6% were married couples living together, 9.4% had a female householder with no husband present, and 28.4% were non-families. 20.6% of all households were made up of individuals, and 4.6% had someone living alone who was 65 years of age or older. The average household size was 2.64 and the average family size was 3.06.

In the CDP, the population was spread out, with 11.2% under the age of 18, 55.6% from 18 to 24, 18.0% from 25 to 44, 12.0% from 45 to 64, and 3.2% who were 65 years of age or older. The median age was 21 years. For every 100 females, there were 73.6 males. For every 100 females age 18 and over, there were 71.0 males.

The median income for a household in the CDP was $66,176, and the median income for a family was $84,624. Males had a median income of $44,609 versus $36,736 for females. The per capita income for the CDP was $16,533. None of the families and 8.8% of the population were below the poverty line. None of those under the age of 18 or those 65 and older were living below the poverty line.
