= Raynham Center, Massachusetts =

- Census-designated place
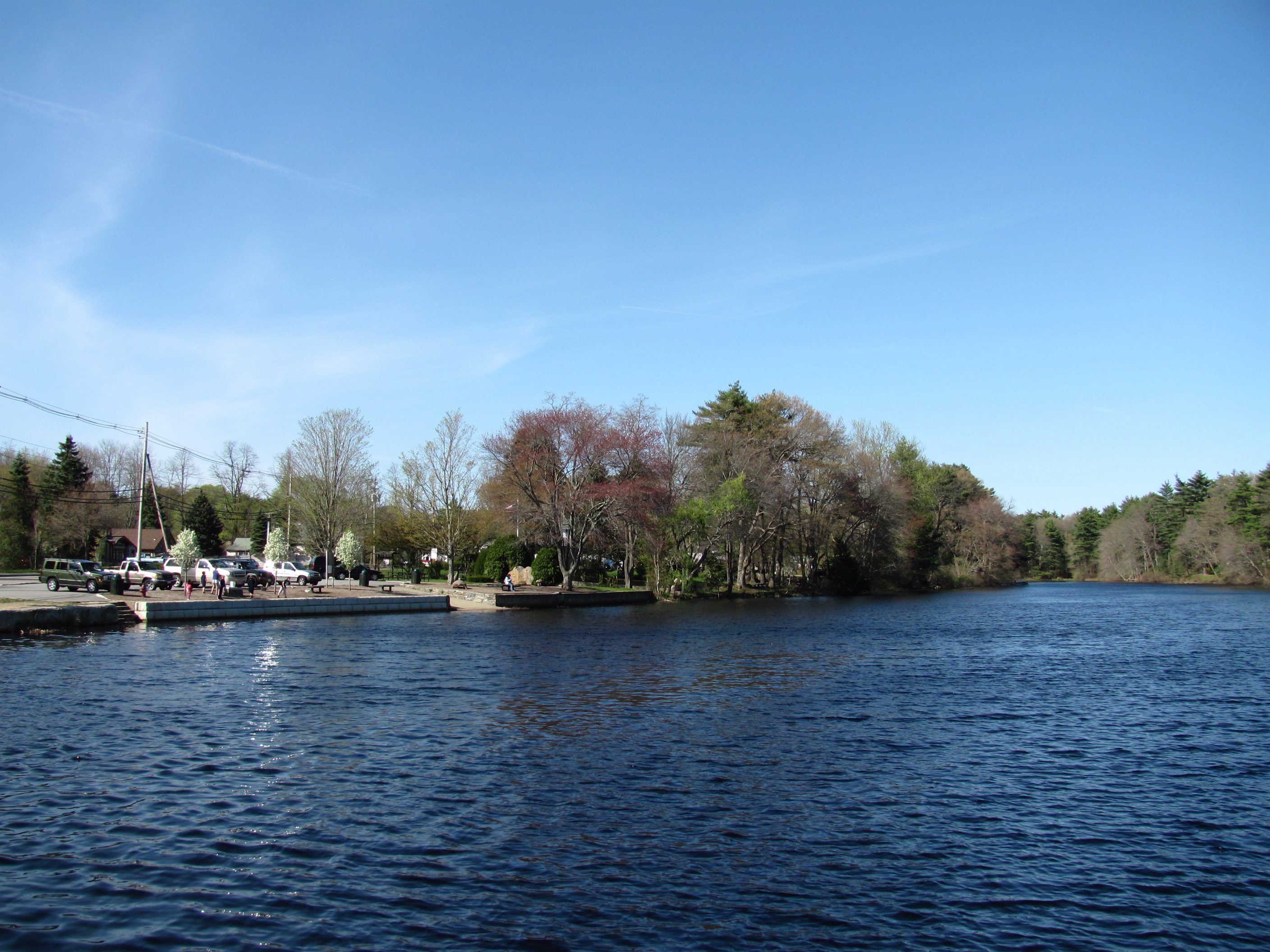
- Johnson Pond

- Location in Bristol County in Massachusetts
- Coordinates: 41°55′55″N 71°2′35″W
- Country: United States
- State: Massachusetts
- County: Bristol
- Town: Raynham

Area
  - Total: 4.34 sq mi (11.25 km^{2})
  - Land: 4.22 sq mi (10.92 km^{2})
  - Water: 0.13 sq mi (0.33 km^{2})
- Elevation: 39 ft (12 m)

Population (2020)
  - Total: 4,365
  - Density: 1,035.4/sq mi (399.76/km^{2})
- Time zone: UTC-5 (Eastern (EST))
  - Summer (DST): UTC-4 (EDT)
- ZIP Codes: 02768 (Raynham Center); 02767 (Raynham)
- Area code: 508 / 774
- FIPS code: 25-56095
- GNIS feature ID: 0613137

Raynham Center is a census-designated place (CDP) in the town of Raynham, Massachusetts, United States. As of the 2020 census, Raynham Center had a population of 4,365.

== Geography ==
Raynham Center is located at 41°55′55″N 71°2′35″W (41.931854, -71.043151).

According to the United States Census Bureau, the CDP has a total area of 11.3 km^{2} (4.4 mi^{2}), of which 11.0 km^{2} (4.3 mi^{2}) is land and 0.3 km^{2} (0.1 mi^{2}) (2.51%) is water.

== Demographics ==
Historical population
| Census | Pop. | Note | %± |
|---|---|---|---|
| 2020 | 4,365 | | — |
U.S. Decennial Census

=== 2020 census ===
As of the 2020 census, Raynham Center had a population of 4,365. The median age was 40.0 years. 23.0% of residents were under the age of 18 and 17.9% of residents were 65 years of age or older. For every 100 females there were 92.3 males, and for every 100 females age 18 and over there were 90.9 males age 18 and over.

100.0% of residents lived in urban areas, while 0.0% lived in rural areas.

There were 1,549 households in Raynham Center, of which 36.0% had children under the age of 18 living in them. Of all households, 54.2% were married-couple households, 13.0% were households with a male householder and no spouse or partner present, and 24.6% were households with a female householder and no spouse or partner present. About 18.6% of all households were made up of individuals and 8.5% had someone living alone who was 65 years of age or older.

There were 1,585 housing units, of which 2.3% were vacant. The homeowner vacancy rate was 0.3% and the rental vacancy rate was 2.1%.

Racial composition as of the 2020 census
| Race | Number | Percent |
|---|---|---|
| White | 3,623 | 83.0% |
| Black or African American | 246 | 5.6% |
| American Indian and Alaska Native | 4 | 0.1% |
| Asian | 107 | 2.5% |
| Native Hawaiian and Other Pacific Islander | 4 | 0.1% |
| Some other race | 66 | 1.5% |
| Two or more races | 315 | 7.2% |
| Hispanic or Latino (of any race) | 166 | 3.8% |

=== 2000 census ===
As of the census of 2000, there were 3,633 people, 1,235 households, and 1,037 families residing in the CDP. The population density was 329.3/km^{2} (852.5/mi^{2}). There were 1,252 housing units at an average density of 113.5/km^{2} (293.8/mi^{2}). The racial makeup of the CDP was 96.20% White, 1.05% African American, 0.03% Native American, 1.13% Asian, 0.08% Pacific Islander, 0.61% from other races, and 0.91% from two or more races. Hispanic or Latino of any race were 0.74% of the population.

There were 1,235 households, out of which 38.9% had children under the age of 18 living with them, 70.7% were married couples living together, 10.2% had a female householder with no husband present, and 16.0% were non-families. 13.0% of all households were made up of individuals, and 6.1% had someone living alone who was 65 years of age or older. The average household size was 2.94 and the average family size was 3.21.

In the CDP, the population was spread out, with 25.9% under the age of 18, 8.3% from 18 to 24, 28.7% from 25 to 44, 27.4% from 45 to 64, and 9.8% who were 65 years of age or older. The median age was 38 years. For every 100 females, there were 93.5 males. For every 100 females age 18 and over, there were 90.6 males.

The median income for a household in the CDP was $64,464, and the median income for a family was $66,531. Males had a median income of $43,718 versus $32,772 for females. The per capita income for the CDP was $24,131. About 3.7% of families and 2.3% of the population were below the poverty line, including 2.0% of those under age 18 and 4.9% of those age 65 or over.
