= Administrative divisions of Massachusetts =

Massachusetts shares with the five other New England states a governmental structure known as the New England town. Only the southeastern third of the state has functioning county governments; in western, central, and northeastern Massachusetts, traditional county-level government was eliminated in the late 1990s. Generally speaking, there are four kinds of public school districts in Massachusetts: local schools, regional schools, vocational/technical schools, and charter schools.

== Municipalities ==
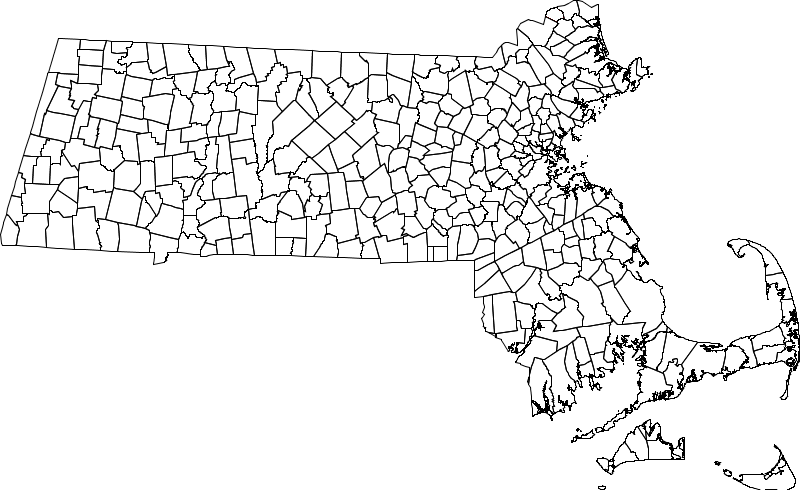
Massachusetts cities and towns. All territory of the state is within the bounds of a municipality.

In many other states, a town is a compact incorporated area; between the towns are unincorporated areas, usually quite large, that do not belong to any town. Such states are completely apportioned into counties, and county governments have significant importance, particularly to those living outside towns, and often perform major functions such as providing police and fire services and operating airports.

In contrast, with the possible exception of the Graves Light, all of the land in Massachusetts is divided up among the cities and towns and there are no "unincorporated" areas or population centers, nor townships. (This is generally true of most of the New England states, and is described at length at New England town.) This complicates comparisons with other non-New England states. The U.S. Census Bureau considers Massachusetts cities and towns to be minor civil divisions, equivalent to townships in other states, but townships usually have weaker forms of government. Many Massachusetts residents also identify with neighborhoods, villages, or other districts of their towns and cities.

=== Services ===
Nearly all municipalities have their own police departments with a couple now sharing services, as do many Massachusetts colleges and universities. The Massachusetts State Police have sole authority under state law for investigating homicides, except for Boston, Worcester, and Springfield but will assist those agencies when needed. Fire protection is generally also provided by municipal fire departments but may be divided among multiple smaller departments servicing just individual villages and population centers. Examples of multiple departments servicing the same towns include Dartmouth (three districts), Palmer (three districts) and Barnstable (five districts, plus an airport department). Massport has its own fire department, and its Crash Fire Rescue organization provides protection on agency property. Fire departments have mutual aid agreements, such as the Massachusetts Metro Fire District in Greater Boston, which facilitate emergency response across department boundaries.

Water and sewer districts are generally operated at the municipal level, providing retail service to residential and business customers, and making provisions for sewage treatment and acquiring water from wells, rivers, or wholesaler. Some local water districts have been consolidated across municipal boundaries and some operate at the sub-municipal (village) level. Running water and sewer service is not necessarily available to all buildings, especially in low-density areas; building owners in these areas must obtain their own water and dispose of their own sewage. The Massachusetts Water Resources Authority provides wholesale water and sewer services to many cities and towns, mostly in Greater Boston, in cooperation with DCR watershed land management. Combined sewers in some areas are being separated to reduce water pollution.

State laws delegate limited control over building, alcohol, marijuana, gambling, and taxi licenses to municipal governments. Municipal governments own most roads, and many use police and traffic control officers to enforce their own parking regulations, and set speed limits and various restrictions on local roads within state parameters. Maintenance of state-owned roads (typically major), setting the rules of the road, driver and vehicle licenses, and public transportation are MassDOT responsibilities, though regional transportation agencies such as the MBTA are funded partly by fees paid by municipalities.

=== Limits to municipal government ===
Many Massachusetts towns were established during the British colonial period, long before the existence of an independent United States. The Massachusetts Constitution was written before the end of the American Revolution (1780). This constitution re-established the relationship between the state government and the towns which was originally specified by the charter which was granted to the Massachusetts Bay Company by King Charles I in 1629.

As in most of New England, the powers of Massachusetts cities and towns are set forth in the state constitution, state statutes, and municipal charters. However, the laws regulating their authority have historically been very broadly construed, and there is a long-standing tradition of local autonomy.

In 1966, the Home Rule Amendment to the Massachusetts Constitution created a limited home rule mechanism explicitly granting certain powers to cities and towns. According to the Amendment:

- Municipalities may adopt charters without needing state approval
- Municipalities may not regulate elections, collect taxes, borrow money, define civil laws or regulations, define felonies or set imprisonment as a punishment for any offense, or dispose of park land; except as provided by the legislature
- Whether or not it has adopted a charter, a municipality may exercise any power that the legislature has the power to delegate to it, except in cases where the legislature has already acted, explicitly or implicitly. (Given the large number of matters on which the state legislature has acted, this means the actual powers of municipalities are quite limited, and sometimes uncertain until tested in court.)

The legislature is prohibited from passing any special laws that affect fewer than two municipalities, except in any of the following circumstances:

- Approval of a Home Rule Petition from the municipal government
- By two-thirds supermajority and the consent of the Governor
- Establishing metropolitan or regional agencies with borders different from existing municipalities
- Creation, dissolution, and merger of municipalities, and adjustment of boundaries

Many municipalities seek approval for special legislation giving them desired powers, which may or may not be available to them under the blanket grant of Home Rule, due to potentially conflicting state laws. The 1966 amendment continued and expanded upon the long-standing tradition of local autonomy.

The Zoning Act grants substantial zoning powers to municipalities. The Massachusetts Subdivision Control Law also concerns land use regulation.

=== Form of government: city vs. town ===
Notable municipalities by population (2002)		Population
Largest city	Boston	667,137
Largest town	Brookline	58,732
Smallest city	North Adams	13,708
Smallest town	Gosnold	75

As in most of New England, the distinction between a "city" and "town" as defined in Massachusetts law is primarily related to the form of government that the municipality has chosen. A town is governed under a town meeting form of government–either via an open town meeting or representative town meeting, with a board of selectmen handling town affairs between meetings. A city has a council or board of aldermen (and may or may not have a mayor, a city manager, or both).

Prior to 1821, the only recognized form of government in Massachusetts was the town meeting. On April 9, 1821, an amendment to the state constitution was approved that permitted municipalities to choose other forms of government. On February 23, 1822, the Governor approved an act that granted a city form of government to Boston. The new charter for "the City of Boston" was drafted by Lemuel Shaw, later Justice of the Massachusetts Supreme Judicial Court. The voters of Boston approved the acceptance of the proposed city charter on March 4, 1822.

The state Constitution stipulates that any municipality that has a population under 12,000 cannot adopt "city" form of government and charter; any "town" with less than 6,000 population cannot adopt a representative town meeting charter and form of government. This applies whether or not the municipality has adopted a home rule charter. Other details of city and town government are left to the legislature.

State law defines six possible options for city governments:

- Plan A - "Strong mayor" - Mayor and a city council, the councilors being elected at large. Party primaries prohibited.
- Plan B - "Weak mayor" - Mayor and city council, the councilors being elected partly at large and partly from districts or wards of the city. Party primaries prohibited.
- Plan C - "Commission" - Mayor and commissioners. Party primaries prohibited.
- Plan D - "Council-manager"- City council of seven or nine (one of whom is the mayor), and a city manager. Party primaries prohibited.
- Plan E - "Council-manager"- City council of seven or nine (one of whom is the mayor), a city manager; members of the council and the school committee elected at large by proportional representation.
- Plan F - "Partisan mayor-council" - Mayor and city council, the councilors being elected partly at large and partly from wards of the city, with political party primaries.

There are also certain operational differences between cities and towns. For instance, changes to town by-laws require approval by the Massachusetts Attorney General, but changes to city ordinances do not.

A 1966 amendment to the Massachusetts Constitution affirmed the right of local municipalities to self-government and to the exercise of powers not inconsistent with state law. It also prohibited the state legislature from abolishing or combining cities and towns without their consent, and made it illegal for the legislature to enact legislation affecting only one municipality without that community's request or consent.

As part of the amendment, Massachusetts for the first time allowed cities and towns to draft and adopt their own home rule charters without receiving permission or approval from the state. The legislature adopted the state Home Rule Procedures Act to establish a process to accomplish the constitutional mandate.

For towns without a home rule charter, changes in the structure of the local government must be approved by petitioning the General Court for special legislation giving it that authority, or through adoption of one of the so-called Acceptance Act Charters, A through F. Communities with home rule charters must also request a Special Act in order to exercise a power the state has reserved to itself, such as increase the number of liquor licenses allowed in a city or town.

As of 2000, 71 municipalities had adopted home-rule charters under the Home Rule Amendment procedure, 13 operated under charters granted by Special Acts of the legislature passed before the Home Rule Amendment, and 19 operated under Special Acts pass after the Home Rule Amendment.

Out of 53 cities in the Commonwealth, there are now eleven that are legally cities and have city councils, but retained "Town of" in their names. This distinction derives from provisions of state law that reference the town meeting form of government and that provide for greater self-governance authority for the class of communities governed by a form of chief executive and council which are referred to as cities in state law.

Communities adopting a city form while retaining "Town of" as their name are: Agawam, Amesbury, Barnstable, Braintree, Franklin, Palmer, Southbridge, Watertown, West Springfield, Weymouth, and Winthrop.

Legal opinions provided to charter commissions in some of first of the 11 communities adopting a style of government that the General Laws referred to as a city form suggested that for clarity the community be referenced as "the City Known as the Town of X" as its legal name. The term "town" was retained in many cases because a suburban community did not desire to be known as a "city" with the urban issues the name implies, but wished to adopt the city form of government.

How a municipality refers to itself has been said to be a decision that is up to the community. The Massachusetts Supreme Judicial Court has ruled that what a municipality calls itself doesn't matter: "It is the substance of the thing done, and not the name given to it, which controls". Opinion of the Justices to the Senate, 229 Mass. 600 (Mass. 1918). The "City known as the Town of" reference was intended in communities adopting it to assert its right to exercise the authority of a city in governance, municipal finance and procurement. In the early days of the spread of the council-based municipal government to towns, it served to eliminate confusion as to a town's ability to do a particular thing.

Prior to the adoption of the Home Rule Amendment, no town had become a city in Massachusetts for 45 years, while four made the change in the first 10 years following the adoption of home rule.

=== Revenues ===
- Local property tax. The Legislature has authorized local governments to administer the property tax under state supervision, and to set property tax rates locally. A 1980 law, passed by popular ballot and known as "Proposition 2½," sets limits on property tax and automotive excise tax rates. There are three parts to the property tax limit calculation.
  - Levy Ceiling: A community may not, in any one year, collect more than 2.5% of the total full and fair cash value of all taxable real and personal property in the community.
  - Levy (Increase) Limit. The annual increase of the amount collected cannot exceed 2.5% over the previous year, plus the amount corresponding to increased property values.
  - New Growth. Each year, the state Department of Revenue calculates a "new growth" figure for each municipality, allowing that community to increase its levy a certain amount beyond the 2.5% limit to account for value-adding improvements in the local property stock, such as the subdivision of farms to build high-priced homes.

A municipality is permitted but not required to tax up to the levy limit. If a city or town wants to raise more money than it is allowed under either the ceiling or the increase limit, it must get voter approval for a "Proposition 2½ override" or a "Proposition 2½ debt exclusion." An exception is granted for water and sewer debt. Tax increases voted through a debt exclusion must be tied to a certain cost and expire on a future date; an override increase sets a new benchmark for all future 2.5 percent rises.
Some municipalities have a state-authorized property tax exemption for low-price owner-occupied residences of up to 30%.
Other exemptions include hospitals, schools, churches, seniors, veterans, surviving spouses, and blind people

- Local income tax. The Massachusetts Constitution was modified in 1915 to permit a state income tax. However, the constitution requires that "such tax ... shall be levied at a uniform rate." This means that local municipalities may not impose a local income tax.
- Local sales tax. The Massachusetts Constitution requires tax rate uniformity, which means that municipal governments may not institute local sales taxes. However, some exceptions have been granted. In 1985, the Legislature granted cities and towns the right to impose sales tax on aviation fuel and hotel/motel occupancy, as a local option.
- Local aid. A significant portion of the income of cities and towns comes from the state government's general fund, and is known as "local aid".
- Fees. Some municipal fees, such as parking fines and towing fees, are limited by state law.
- Unfunded mandates. State laws which place requirements on cities and towns without increasing financial support to cover increased costs are often criticized as "unfunded mandates" and are a controversial issue in local relations. In theory, Proposition 2½ disallowed unfunded mandates after 1981, and in some cases this has been successfully enforced in court. However, the courts have ruled that the legislature may condition other aid on acceptance of the mandates, partially circumventing the law.

== School districts ==
Primary and secondary school attendance is compulsory and free for Massachusetts residents aged 6–16. Massachusetts has a school choice law which allows students to attend a school in a district outside their municipality if the other district has space and approves. K-12 students may also attend private schools. Private schools are not state-funded and generally charge tuition. Many are parochial schools operated by subdivisions of the Roman Catholic Church.

Generally speaking, there are four kinds of public school districts in Massachusetts: local schools, regional schools, vocational/technical schools, and charter schools.

=== Organization ===
Local schools are funded by one municipality. 50% of the municipalities in Massachusetts use local schools for grades Kindergarten through 12. Local schools are administered by the municipality through an elected or appointed school committee, and are considered a department of the city or town government. In some cities, such as Worcester, Cambridge and Malden, the city charter specifies that the mayor has a permanent seat on the school committee. The capital city of Boston is subject to a special state law which allows the mayor to appoint a school committee of seven. The final budget control for local schools is held by the municipality (Mayor or Town Meeting, respectively), although the school committee receives an annual lump sum appropriation from the municipality, and "town-side" or "city-side" officials have no control over the allocation of School Department funds within the annual appropriation, which is controlled by the school committee.

Any two or more municipalities may combine their public schools into one district and form regional schools. 27% of the municipalities in Massachusetts have K-12 regional schools, while many other communities are served by local primary Schools and regional secondary schools. Regional schools are administered by a school committee that consists of representatives of the municipalities in the region. Final budget control for a regional district is still held by the voters of its member municipalities, however. Participating mayors and Town Meetings still vote on the bottom line of their share of the regional budget. If municipalities within a school district disagree (e.g., if one town funds 100% of the regional school committee's request, and another funds only 75%), a second round of decisions is taken. If the disagreement persists, registered voters within the regional district's boundaries assemble for a "district meeting," similar to a town meeting, at which a majority vote of attendees prevails. Each member city or town must then adjust its own budget to accommodate the voted assessments.

Several regional school districts overlay the "academic" school district system and provide vocational and technical high schools for students from several communities. Vocational/technical schools are administered by a regional school committee. The structure of this committee is established in the regional agreement. Like any regional school committee, vocational committees have final budget control for school spending decisions, but still depend on local authorities for funding.

Charter schools are publicly funded schools that are subject to different administrative structures from traditional public schools. There are two types of charter schools in Massachusetts. Massachusetts law specifies governance and entities eligible to apply for a charter, or operate a charter school as follows:

Persons or entities eligible to submit an application to establish a charter school shall include, but not be limited to a non-profit business or corporate entity, two or more certified teachers or ten or more parents; provided, however, that no for profit business or corporate entity shall be eligible to apply for a charter. Said application may be filed in conjunction with a college, university, museum or other similar non-profit entity. Private and parochial schools shall not be eligible for charter school status.

Commonwealth Charter Schools were created as part of Education Reform in 1993. Commonwealth Charter Schools are formed by the approval of a charter that defines its administrative structure. Charter Schools are not subject to the collective bargaining agreements that are negotiated for other public schools. There are 51 Commonwealth Charter Schools in Massachusetts. Commonwealth Charter Schools are administered by a board of trustees of the private entity that received the charter authority to operate the school.

Horace Mann Charter Schools were defined in 1997. The charter for these schools must be approved by the local school committee and the local union. There are 8 Horace Mann Charter Schools in Massachusetts. A Horace Mann Chater school is run operated and managed by a board of trustees independent of the school committees which approve said schools. The board of trustees may include a member of the school committee. The board of trustees may include a municipal school committee member.

All school districts in Massachusetts must employ a superintendent and business (or finance) manager. Many districts also have assistant or associate superintendents, pupil services directors, special education directors, and other administrators, although these are not required by state law. State law is developed into regulations by the Massachusetts Board of Education to govern local, regional, vocational, and charter schools.

=== School funding and construction ===
The cost of operating public schools comes from two sources: local government, funded primarily by the property tax, and payments from the state Legislature (out of the state general fund), calculated to provide more aid to economically weaker school districts and thereby equalize educational opportunity across the state. These "Chapter 70" payments are in addition to separate local aid payments to town and city governments' general funds.

Cities and towns are required by state law to spend a minimum amount on education. This required amount is referred to as "Net School Spending" and is calculated as part of the Chapter 70 funding formula.

Each school district is allocated a certain amount of funding through a foundational budget, which is based on the number of students that community is required to educate according to enrollment figures as of October 1 of the previous year, as well as the calculated wealth of a community. However, when a student transfers out of district to another public district, to a charter school, a public vocational school, etc., a certain amount of funding is transferred along with them.

School construction and renovation projects fall under the budgetary and land use powers of the municipalities rather than the school boards.

== Counties ==
District attorneys and sheriffs are elected by constituencies that mostly, but not entirely, follow county boundaries; they are funded by the state budget. Though most county governments have been abolished, each county still has a Sheriff's Department which operates jails and correctional facilities and service of process within the county.

By the 1990s, most functions of county governments (including operation of courts and road maintenance) had been taken over by the state, and most county governments were seen as inefficient and outmoded. The government of Suffolk County was substantially integrated with the city government of Boston more than one hundred years ago, to the extent that the members of the Boston city council are ex officio the Suffolk County Commissioners, and Boston's treasurer and auditor fulfill the same offices for the county. Thus, residents of the other three Suffolk County communities do not have a voice on the county commission, but all the county expenses are paid by the city of Boston.

The government of Nantucket County, which is geographically coterminous with the Town of Nantucket, is operated as a consolidated town and county government — the town selectmen (executive branch) act as the county commissioners. This is the only such example of a true consolidated city-county in New England.

Mismanagement of Middlesex County's public hospital in the mid-1990s left that county on the brink of insolvency, and in 1997 the Massachusetts legislature stepped in by assuming all assets and obligations of the county. The government of Middlesex County was officially abolished on July 11, 1997. Later that year, the Franklin County Commission voted itself out of existence. The law abolishing Middlesex County also provided for the elimination of Hampden County and Worcester County on July 1, 1998. This law was later amended to abolish Hampshire County on January 1, 1999; Essex County and Suffolk County on July 1 of that same year; and Berkshire County on July 1, 2000. Chapter 34B of the Massachusetts General Laws allows other counties either to abolish themselves, or to reorganize as a "regional council of governments", as Hampshire and Franklin Counties have done. The governments of Bristol, Plymouth, and Norfolk Counties remain substantially unchanged. Barnstable and Dukes Counties have adopted modern county charters, enabling them to act as efficient regional governments. Dukes County in particular has a strong regional planning agency known as the Martha's Vineyard Commission.

== Quasi-public state agencies ==
Historically Massachusetts has had numerous specially chartered quasi-public state agencies that operated outside of the executive branch of the state government. These organizations provide either statewide or regional services. They are created to provide a measure of flexibility for administration, avoiding many of the regulations that other public agencies are subject to. Independent organizations such as the Pioneer Institute and private media entities have sought to report or research these agencies in the interest of the taxpaying public.

Such agencies are organized under such legislation such as MGL § 7 (14). Examples include the Commonwealth Health Insurance Connector Authority, which provides a platform for maintaining Massachusetts' statewide healthcare insurance platform.

List of some Massachusetts quasi-public agencies:

- the Massachusetts Industrial Finance Agency, established by 496 (3) -- 1978.
- the Community Development Finance Corporation, established by 866 (2) -- 1975.
- the Massachusetts Technology Development Corporation, established by 497 (1) -- 1978.
- the Government Land Bank, established by 212 -- 1975.
- the Massachusetts Product Development Corporation, established by 40 (K).

== Official websites ==
- Official website
