= Benjamin Nye Homestead =

Historic house in Massachusetts, United States

- U.S. National Register of Historic Places
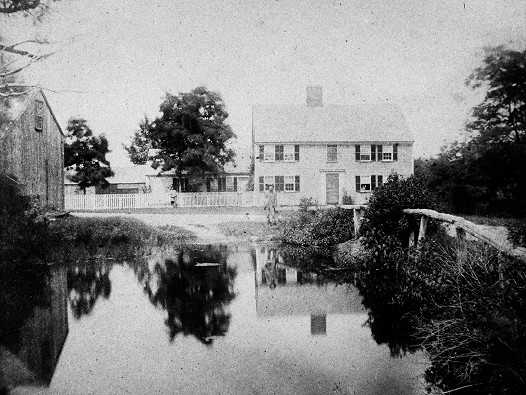
- The house c. 1880

- Location within Cape Cod Location within Massachusetts Location within the United States
- Location: 85 Old County Road, Sandwich, Massachusetts
- Coordinates: 41°43′43″N 70°25′55″W
- Built: 1678
- Architectural style: Colonial, Federal
- NRHP reference No.: 91001899
- Added to NRHP: January 6, 1992

The Benjamin Nye Homestead is a historic house museum in Sandwich, Massachusetts. The earliest portion of the 2.5-story timber-frame house was built in 1678 by Benjamin Nye, and has remained in the hands of his descendants for most of the time since then. It was apparently originally built as a saltbox style house with an integral leanto section, with the rear of the house being raise to a full two stories, probably in the 19th century. The house was sold out of the Nye family to the state of Massachusetts in 1924, but was poorly maintained by the state. With the house threatened with demolition in 1962, the Nye Family Association acquired the property and restored the house. The house was listed on the National Register of Historic Places in 1992. A dendrochronology team conducted a study in 2012 establishing the build date.

The Nye Family Association now operates the property as a historic house museum, featuring 18th century furnishings, and is open for tours from June through October.

== See also ==
- National Register of Historic Places listings in Barnstable County, Massachusetts
