= Westville, Massachusetts =

Coordinates: 41°53′10″N 71°08′08″W

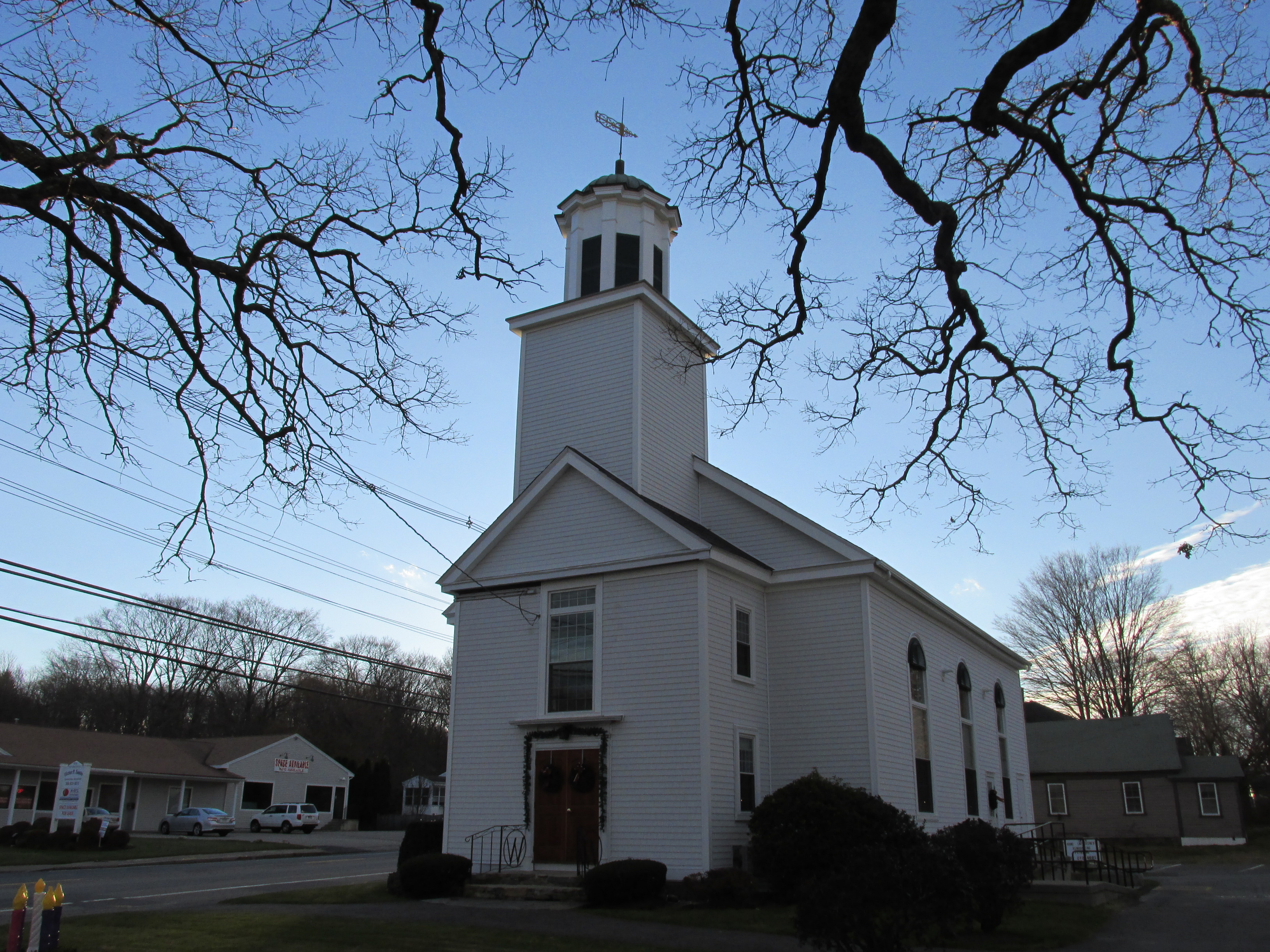
West Congregational Church

Westville is one of five primary historic neighborhoods of the city of Taunton, Massachusetts. Although these neighborhoods are not census-designated areas, they are municipally designated populated regions of the city.

== Location ==
Westville is located on the west end of the city bordering the Oakland and Weir neighborhoods, and the towns of Rehoboth and Dighton.

== Transportation ==
US Route 44 is the only major route within the Westville neighborhood. Route 44 serves as the main connecting road between Taunton and Providence, Rhode Island.
