= Mansfield Center, Massachusetts =

- Census-designated place
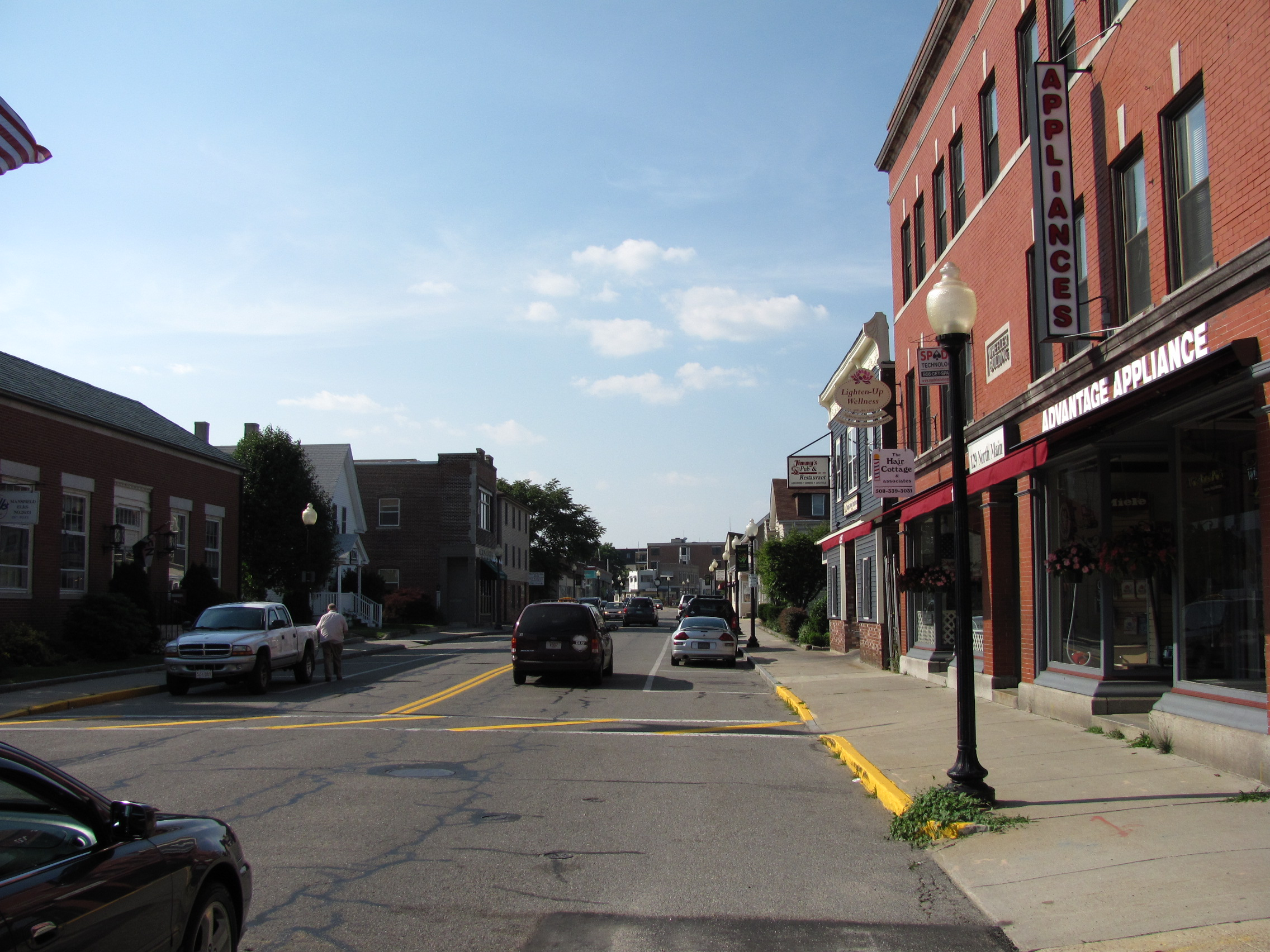
- North Main Street

- Location in Bristol County in Massachusetts
- Coordinates: 42°1′42″N 71°13′8″W
- Country: United States
- State: Massachusetts
- County: Bristol
- Town: Mansfield

Area
  - Total: 2.82 sq mi (7.30 km^{2})
  - Land: 2.76 sq mi (7.14 km^{2})
  - Water: 0.062 sq mi (0.16 km^{2})

Population (2020)
  - Total: 7,830
  - Density: 2,841.2/sq mi (1,097.01/km^{2})
- Time zone: UTC-5 (Eastern (EST))
  - Summer (DST): UTC-4 (EDT)
- ZIP code: 02048
- Area codes: 508 and 774
- FIPS code: 25-38230

Mansfield Center is a census-designated place (CDP) in the town of Mansfield, Massachusetts, United States. As of the 2020 census, Mansfield Center had a population of 7,830.

== Geography ==
Mansfield Center is located at 42°1′42″N 71°13′8″W (42.028249, -71.218807).

According to the United States Census Bureau, the CDP has a total area of 7.5 km^{2} (2.9 sq mi), of which 7.4 km^{2} (2.9 sq mi) is land and 0.1 km^{2} (0.039 sq mi) (1.04%) is water.

== Demographics ==
Historical population
Census	Pop.	Note	%±
2020	7,830		—
U.S. Decennial Census

=== 2020 census ===
As of the 2020 census, Mansfield Center had a population of 7,830. The median age was 40.2 years. 19.6% of residents were under the age of 18 and 14.4% of residents were 65 years of age or older. For every 100 females there were 94.1 males, and for every 100 females age 18 and over there were 93.9 males age 18 and over.

100.0% of residents lived in urban areas, while 0.0% lived in rural areas.

There were 3,368 households in Mansfield Center, of which 28.9% had children under the age of 18 living in them. Of all households, 45.3% were married-couple households, 19.2% were households with a male householder and no spouse or partner present, and 27.7% were households with a female householder and no spouse or partner present. About 31.9% of all households were made up of individuals and 11.4% had someone living alone who was 65 years of age or older.

There were 3,510 housing units, of which 4.0% were vacant. The homeowner vacancy rate was 1.0% and the rental vacancy rate was 3.5%.

Racial composition as of the 2020 census
Race	Number	Percent
White	6,568	83.9%
Black or African American	272	3.5%
American Indian and Alaska Native	7	0.1%
Asian	403	5.1%
Native Hawaiian and Other Pacific Islander	3	0.0%
Some other race	108	1.4%
Two or more races	469	6.0%
Hispanic or Latino (of any race)	306	3.9%

=== 2000 census ===
As of the 2000 census, there were 7,320 people, 3,039 households, and 1,841 families residing in the CDP. The population density was 988.2 people /km^{2} (2,559 people/mi^{2}). There were 3,147 housing units at an average density of 424.8 units /km^{2} (1,100 units/mi^{2}). The racial makeup of the CDP was 94.43% White, 2.39% African American, 0.23% Native American, 1.48% Asian, 0.04% Pacific Islander, 0.51% from other races, and 0.93% from two or more races. Hispanic or Latino of any race were 1.73% of the population.

There were 3,039 households, out of which 30.8% had children under the age of 18 living with them, 47.1% were married couples living together, 10.4% had a female householder with no husband present, and 39.4% were non-families. 32.7% of all households were made up of individuals, and 10.2% had someone living alone who was 65 years of age or older. The average household size was 2.39 and the average family size was 3.11.

In the CDP, the population was spread out, with 25.0% under the age of 18, 6.2% from 18 to 24, 39.7% from 25 to 44, 18.9% from 45 to 64, and 10.2% who were 65 years of age or older. The median age was 34 years. For every 100 females, there were 98.1 males. For every 100 females age 18 and over, there were 92.8 males.

The median income for a household in the CDP was $51,082, and the median income for a family was $68,191. Males had a median income of $42,151 versus $36,015 for females. The per capita income for the CDP was $25,693. About 3.2% of families and 6.0% of the population were below the poverty line, including 3.4% of those under age 18 and 14.7% of those age 65 or over.
