= Acushnet, Massachusetts =

- Town
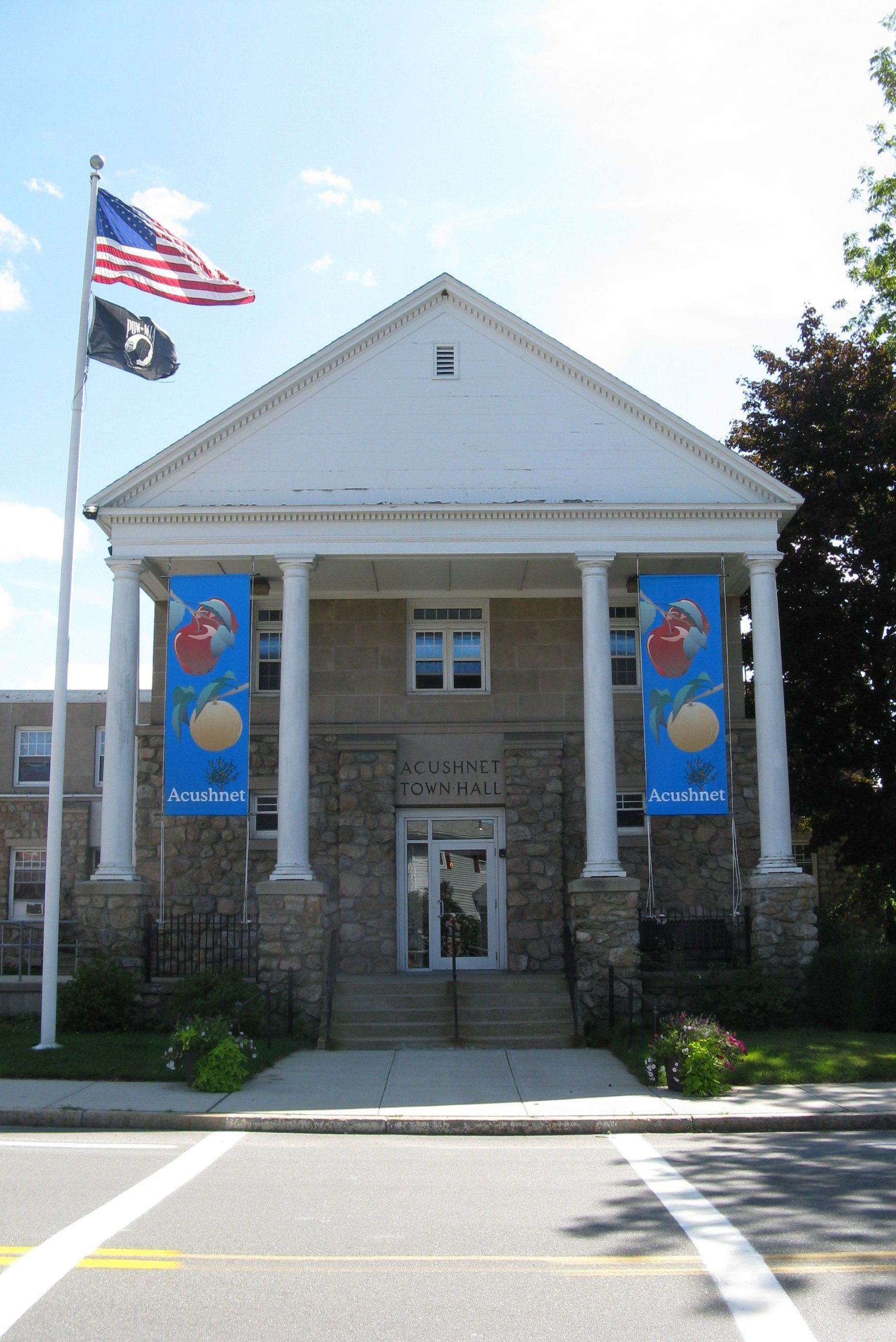
- Acushnet Town Hall

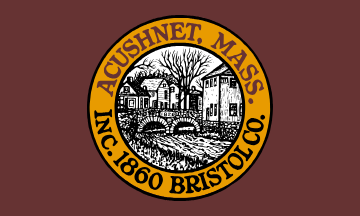
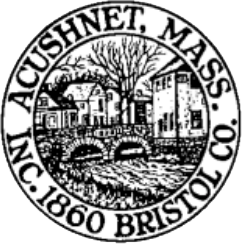
- Flag Seal

- Location in Bristol County in Massachusetts
- Coordinates: 41°40′50″N 70°54′30″W
- Country: United States
- State: Massachusetts
- County: Bristol
- Settled: 1659
- Incorporated: 1860

Government
  - Type: Open town meeting

Area
  - Total: 19.0 sq mi (49.1 km^{2})
  - Land: 18.4 sq mi (47.7 km^{2})
  - Water: 0.54 sq mi (1.4 km^{2})
- Elevation: 72 ft (22 m)

Population (2020)
  - Total: 10,559
  - Density: 573/sq mi (221/km^{2})
- Time zone: UTC-5 (Eastern)
  - Summer (DST): UTC-4 (Eastern)
- ZIP code: 02743
- Area code: 508 / 774
- FIPS code: 25-00520
- GNIS feature ID: 1729673
- Website: www.acushnet.ma.us

Acushnet (/əˈkʊʃnət/) is a town in Bristol County, Massachusetts, United States. The population was 10,559 at the 2020 census.

Acushnet is a part of the South Coast region of Massachusetts which encompasses the cities and towns that surround Buzzards Bay (excluding the Elizabeth Islands, Bourne and Falmouth), Mount Hope Bay and the Sakonnet River.

== History ==
Acushnet was purchased from the Wampanoag in 1652. It has been included as a part of three separate towns throughout its history. It was formerly the northeastern section of the town of Dartmouth, as well as Old Dartmouth, which included the towns of Westport, New Bedford, and Fairhaven. In 1787, New Bedford separated from Dartmouth, and included the lands of Fairhaven and Acushnet. In 1812, Fairhaven was incorporated as a separate town, again including the lands of Acushnet. Finally, the town was officially incorporated in 1860. The name "Acushnet", which is also the name of the river the town lies on, comes from the Wampanoag Cushnea, meaning "peaceful resting place near water", originally designating the fact that the tribe which sold the land to the Puritans inhabited the lands leading up to the river.

In 1841, Herman Melville joined the crew of the whaler Acushnet. He later wrote about his travels at sea culminating in the novel Moby Dick.

In 1910, the Acushnet Process Company (now the Acushnet Company), was founded in the town, and continues to be one of Southeastern Massachusetts's most enduring industries. The Acushnet Company owns the Titleist brand name, under which golf balls, golf clubs, and other golf paraphernalia are marketed.

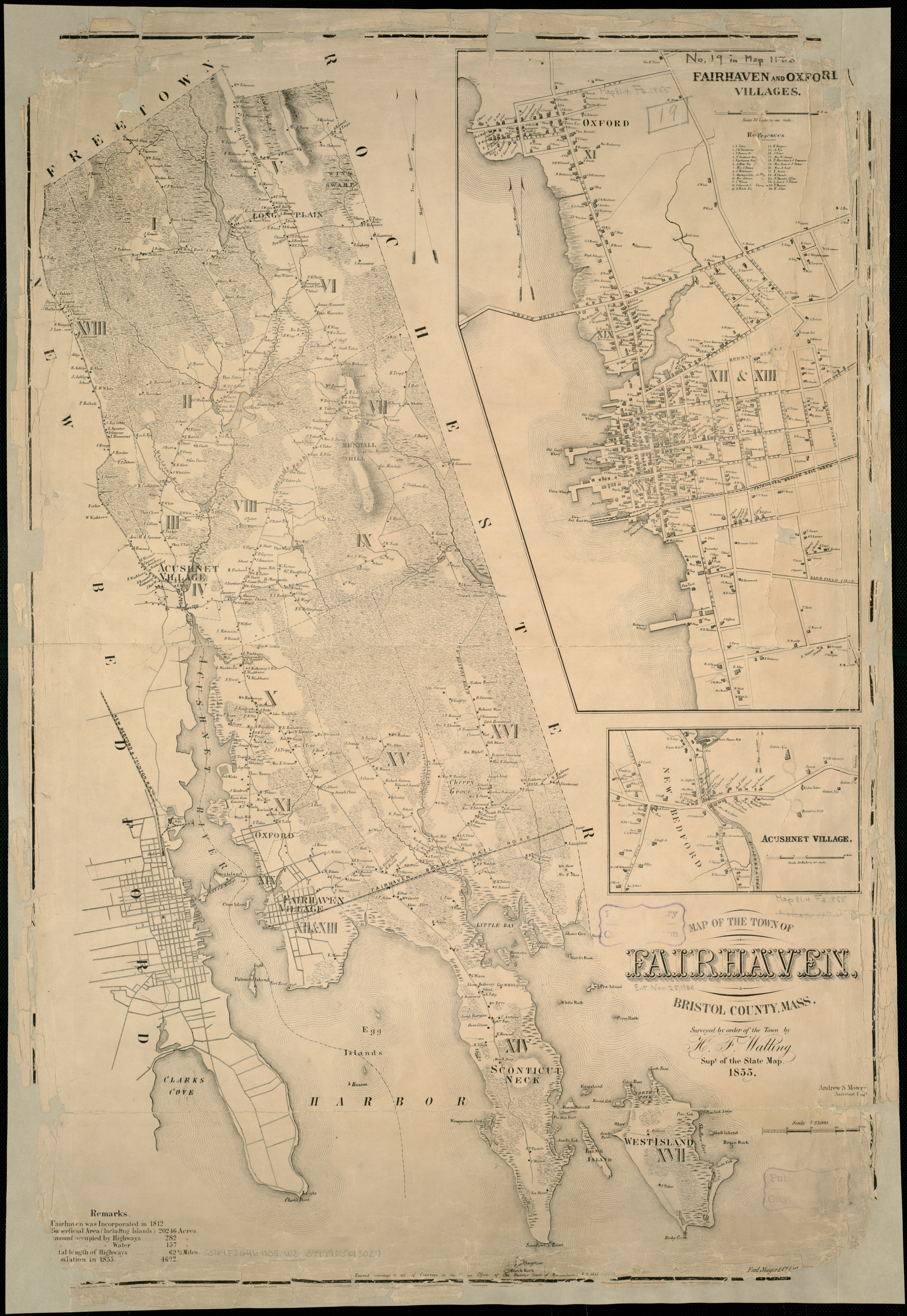
Map from 1855 showing Acushnet as part of Fairhaven

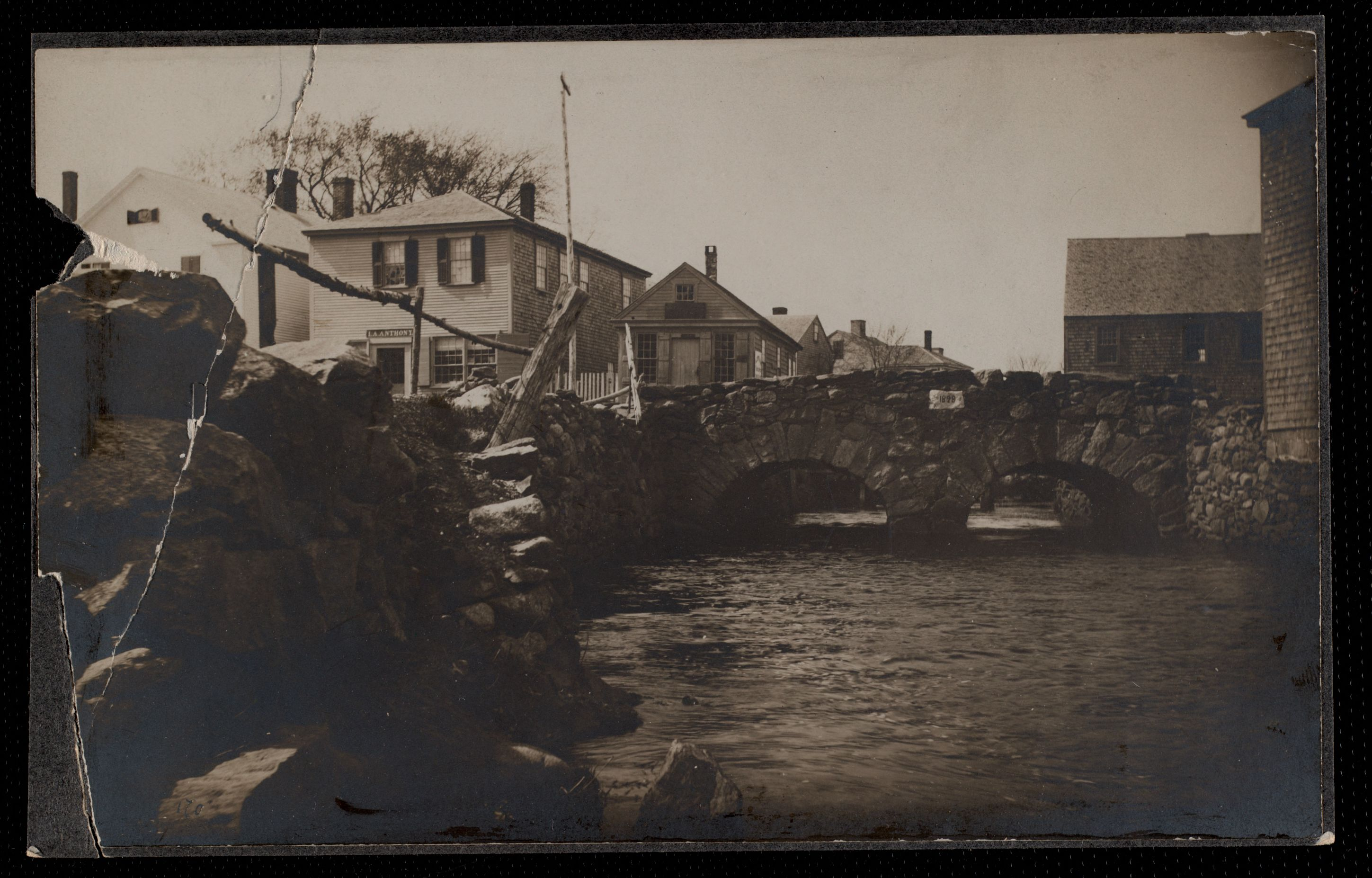
Stone bridge over the Acushnet River looking north

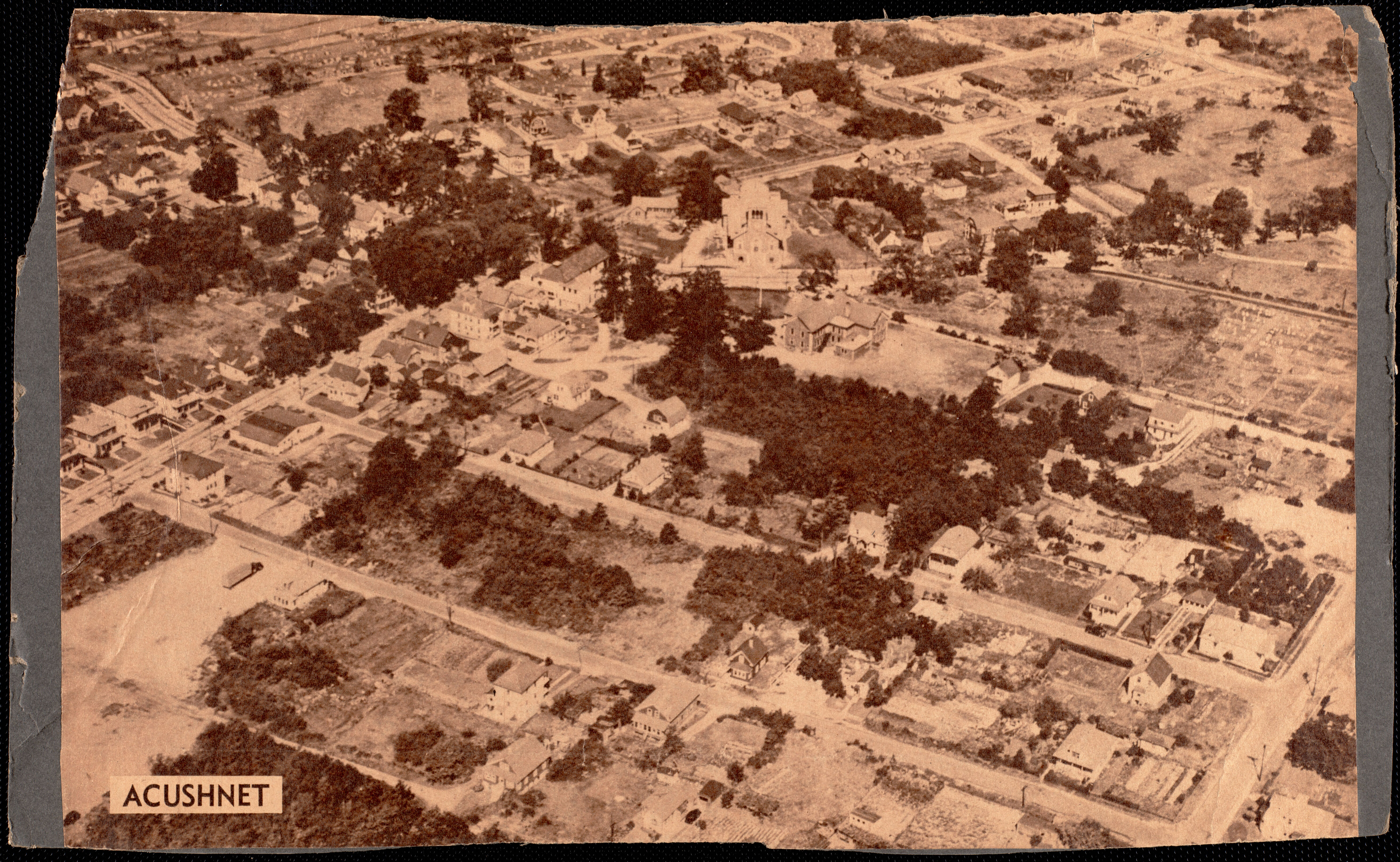
Aerial view of Acushnet Center showing St. Francis Xavier Church in center

== Geography ==
According to the United States Census Bureau, the town has a total area of 19.0 square miles (49.1 km^{2}), of which 18.4 square miles (47.7 km^{2}) is land and 0.54 square miles (1.4 km^{2}), or 2.76%, is water. Acushnet is bordered to the east and northeast by Rochester, to the southeast by Mattapoisett, to the south by Fairhaven, to the west by New Bedford, and to the northwest by Freetown. The town line between Acushnet, Rochester and Mattapoisett forms a portion of the border between Bristol and Plymouth counties. Acushnet lies approximately 50 miles (80 km) south of Boston, 20 miles (32 km) west of Cape Cod, 4 miles (6 km) north of Buzzards Bay, and 30 miles (48 km) southeast of Providence, Rhode Island.

Acushnet contains the Acushnet Center census-designated place, which is the most densely populated part of town. The CDP contains 28.7% of the town's overall population and just 7.7% of its land area.

Acushnet lies along the Acushnet River and its tributaries, including the Keene River and Squinn Brook, which feed the New Bedford Reservoir, in turn feeding the Acushnet. The Acushnet River is the town line between it and New Bedford south of Main Street. There are several other ponds in the town, including Hamlin's Mill Pond (along the Acushnet), East Pond and a portion of Tinkham Pond, which lies along the Mattapoisett town line. The town lies within the coastal plain, mostly below 80 feet (24 m) elevation, with higher points around Mendon and Perry Hills in the southeast of town and in the Sassaquin area in the northwest corner of town, where the highest point in town rises slightly above 160 feet (49 m) above sea level. Most of the town's population lies along the New Bedford line, with the biggest area being in the southwest corner of the town, near the town hall.

== Transportation ==
A short, 2.8-mile (4.5 km) stretch of Route 105 passes through the northeast corner of town, both entering and exiting through Rochester. Otherwise, the town contains no state or federal highways. Route 18 and Route 140 both pass through New Bedford to the west of town, with the former passing within feet of the town line as it enters Freetown. Interstate 195, the nearest interstate to the town, passes just south of the town through Fairhaven, with the nearest exits being Exits 27–29.

SRTA operates a short bus route through the southern part of town, which links to Fairhaven. The nearest MBTA Commuter Rail station is Church Street. New Bedford also has the nearest airport, the New Bedford Regional Airport. The nearest airport with national service is T.F. Green Airport in Rhode Island, 40 mi (64 km) to the west.

According to the U.S. Census Bureau, the mean travel time to work among residents was 28.4 minutes.

== Demographics ==
Historical population
| Year | Pop. | ±% |
|---|---|---|
| 1860 | 1,387 | — |
| 1870 | 1,132 | −18.4% |
| 1880 | 1,105 | −2.4% |
| 1890 | 1,027 | −7.1% |
| 1900 | 1,221 | +18.9% |
| 1910 | 1,692 | +38.6% |
| 1920 | 3,075 | +81.7% |
| 1930 | 4,092 | +33.1% |
| 1940 | 4,145 | +1.3% |
| 1950 | 4,401 | +6.2% |
| 1960 | 5,755 | +30.8% |
| 1970 | 7,767 | +35.0% |
| 1980 | 8,704 | +12.1% |
| 1990 | 9,554 | +9.8% |
| 2000 | 10,161 | +6.4% |
| 2010 | 10,303 | +1.4% |
| 2020 | 10,558 | +2.5% |
| 2025* | 10,800 | +2.3% |
* = population estimate. Source: United States census records and Population Estimates Program data.

As the 2020 census, there were 10,558 residents in the town, with a population density of 573.0 inhabitants per square mile (221.2/km^{2}).

18.3% of residents were under 18 years of age, with 3.7% under 5 years. 21.5% of residents were age 65 or older. 52.3% of the population was female.

The racial makeup of the town was 93.9% White, 0.3% African American, 0.1% Native American, 0.5% Asian, 0.0% Pacific Islander, and 4.4% from two or more races. Hispanic or Latino of any race were 2.9% of the population. 8.3% of residents were born outside the United States. 13.1% of residents aged 5 years or older spoke a language other than English at home.

There were 4,108 households, with an average household size was 2.57.

In 2022, the median income for a household in the town was $88,196, and the median income per capita was $44,630. About 6.4% of the population was below the poverty line.

== Government ==
Acushnet uses the town meeting form of government, with open town meetings and the Board of Selectmen leading the Town Administrator. The town has its own police, and two fire stations near the population center of town and in the northeast corner of town.

Acushnet is divided into three electoral precincts. Precinct 1 contains the southern part of town, including Acushnet Center. Precincts 2 and 3 encompass the northwestern and northeastern sections of the town, respectively.

On the state level, Acushnet is represented in the Massachusetts House of Representatives by William Straus in Precinct 1 (10th Bristol District) and by Paul Schmid in Precincts 2 and 3 (8th Bristol district); it is represented in the Massachusetts Senate by Mark Montigny (2nd Bristol and Plymouth district). On the federal level, Acushnet is part of Massachusetts's 9th congressional district, which is represented by William R. Keating; it is represented in the United States Senate by Elizabeth Warren and Ed Markey.

== Library ==
The town of Acushnet first established a free library in 1896. The town's Russell Memorial Library, dedicated to a member of the prominent Russell family of New Bedford, lies in the town's population center. In fiscal year 2008, the town of Acushnet spent 0.87% ($189,813) of its budget on its public library—some $18 per person.

On December 5, 2015, Russell Memorial Library closed its doors to relocate to the former Marie S. Howard School on Middle Road. The Acushnet Public Library opened on December 21, 2015.

== Education ==
The Acushnet Public School District contains two public schools, an elementary school and a middle school. The Acushnet Elementary School serves students from preschool to fourth grade, and the Albert F. Ford Middle School serves students from fifth to eighth grade. The schools are located next to each other on Middle Road, near the geographic center of town.

High school students may choose to attend either Fairhaven High School or New Bedford High School, and are also eligible to apply to attend Old Colony Regional Vocational Technical High School in Rochester or Bristol County Agricultural High School in Dighton.

The town is also home to Saint Francis Xavier School, a private Catholic school serving kindergarten through eighth grade.

== Notable people ==
- Pat Flynn, Frontman of Straight Edge Hardcore band Have Heart and post-hardcore band Fiddlehead
- Antonio Gattorno (1904–1980), leader in the Cuban Modern Art
- Gideon Nye (1812–1888), merchant in the China trade
- Clement Nye Swift (1846–1918), painter
