= Acushnet Center, Massachusetts =

- Census-designated place
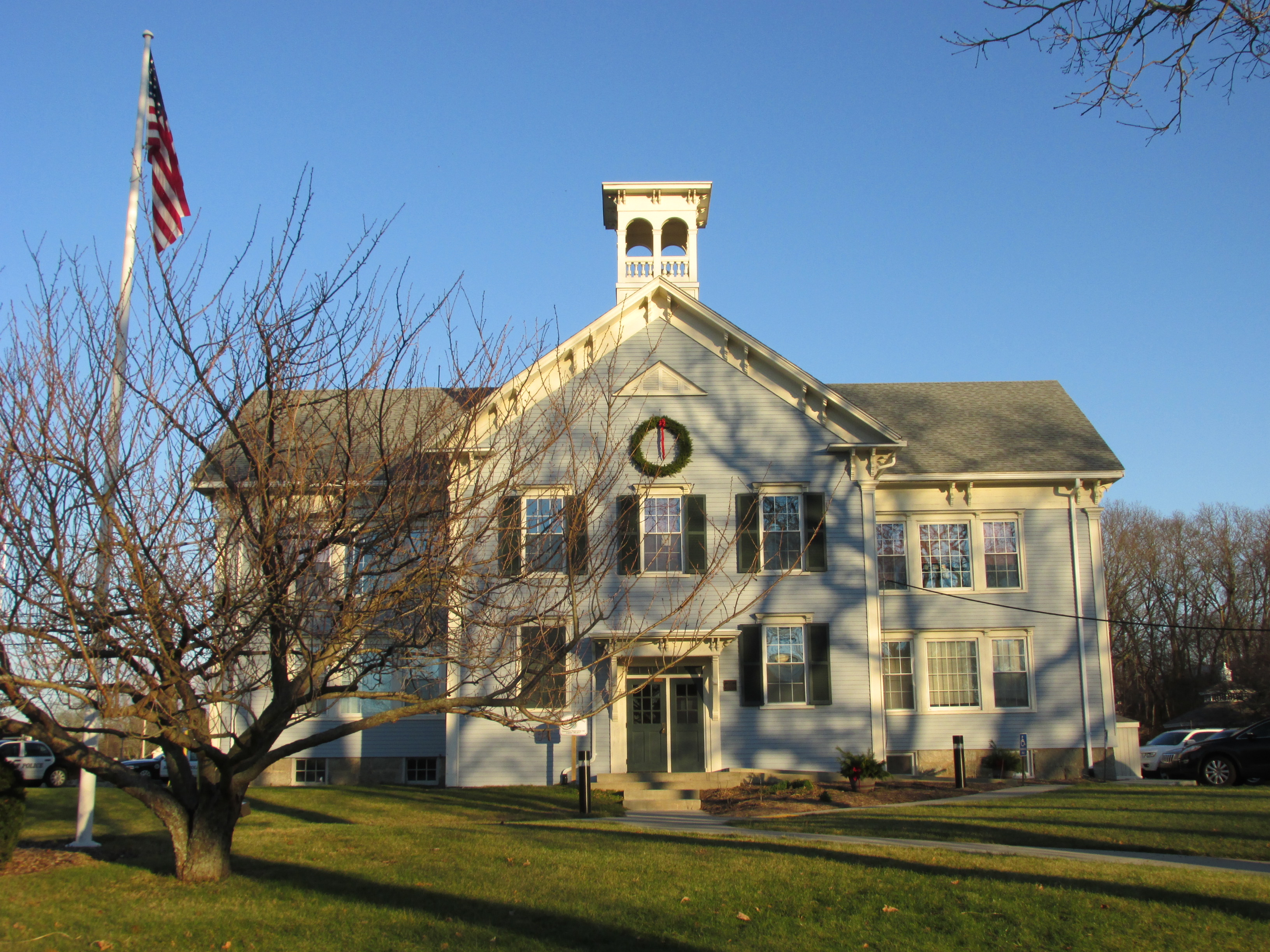
- Parting of the Ways Building

- Location in Bristol County in Massachusetts
- Coordinates: 41°40′57″N 70°54′21″W
- Country: United States
- State: Massachusetts
- County: Bristol
- Town: Acushnet

Area
  - Total: 1.44 sq mi (3.74 km^{2})
  - Land: 1.42 sq mi (3.67 km^{2})
  - Water: 0.031 sq mi (0.08 km^{2})

Population (2020)
  - Total: 3,030
  - Density: 2,141.0/sq mi (826.63/km^{2})
- Time zone: UTC-5 (Eastern (EST))
  - Summer (DST): UTC-4 (EDT)
- ZIP Code: 02743 (Acushnet)
- FIPS code: 25-00530

Acushnet Center is a census-designated place (CDP) in the town of Acushnet in Bristol County, Massachusetts, United States. The population was 3,030 at the 2020 census, which was 28.7% of the population of the entire town.

== Geography ==
Acushnet Center is located entirely within the town of Acushnet.

According to the United States Census Bureau, the CDP has a total area of 1.4 square miles (3.7 km^{2}), of which 0.02 square miles (0.05 km^{2}), or 1.30%, is water.

== Demographics ==
Historical population
Census	Pop.	Note	%±
2020	3,030		—
U.S. Decennial Census

=== 2020 census ===
As of the 2020 census, Acushnet Center had a population of 3,030. The median age was 45.8 years. 18.5% of residents were under the age of 18 and 21.6% of residents were 65 years of age or older. For every 100 females there were 95.7 males, and for every 100 females age 18 and over there were 92.4 males age 18 and over.

100.0% of residents lived in urban areas, while 0.0% lived in rural areas.

There were 1,280 households in Acushnet Center, of which 25.3% had children under the age of 18 living in them. Of all households, 45.4% were married-couple households, 17.2% were households with a male householder and no spouse or partner present, and 30.5% were households with a female householder and no spouse or partner present. About 32.5% of all households were made up of individuals and 14.5% had someone living alone who was 65 years of age or older.

There were 1,358 housing units, of which 5.7% were vacant. The homeowner vacancy rate was 2.0% and the rental vacancy rate was 3.2%.

Racial composition as of the 2020 census
Race	Number	Percent
White	2,818	93.0%
Black or African American	16	0.5%
American Indian and Alaska Native	9	0.3%
Asian	15	0.5%
Native Hawaiian and Other Pacific Islander	0	0.0%
Some other race	33	1.1%
Two or more races	139	4.6%
Hispanic or Latino (of any race)	66	2.2%

=== 2000 census ===
As of the census of 2000, there were 3,171 people, 1,266 households, and 862 families residing in the CDP. The population density was 838.6/km^{2} (2,178.8/mi^{2}). There were 1,305 housing units at an average density of 345.1/km^{2} (896.7/mi^{2}). The racial makeup of the CDP was 96.88% White, 0.66% African American, 0.32% Native American, 0.09% Asian, 0.03% Pacific Islander, 0.73% from other races, and 1.29% from two or more races. Hispanic or Latino of any race were 1.01% of the population.

There were 1,266 households, out of which 28.3% had children under the age of 18 living with them, 54.4% were married couples living together, 10.2% had a female householder with no husband present, and 31.9% were non-families. 27.3% of all households were made up of individuals, and 14.0% had someone living alone who was 65 years of age or older. The average household size was 2.50 and the average family size was 3.06.

In the CDP, the population was spread out, with 21.9% under the age of 18, 7.1% from 18 to 24, 28.1% from 25 to 44, 23.8% from 45 to 64, and 19.0% who were 65 years of age or older. The median age was 41 years. For every 100 females, there were 89.0 males. For every 100 females age 18 and over, there were 85.8 males.

The median income for a household in the CDP was $41,890, and the median income for a family was $52,446. Males had a median income of $36,321 versus $24,087 for females. The per capita income for the village was $21,181. About 2.4% of families and 5.7% of the population were below the poverty line, including 5.0% of those under age 18 and 11.2% of those age 65 or over.
