= Slater Park Zoo =

Former zoo in Pawtucket, Rhode Island, US

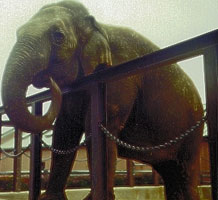
- Fanny the elephant at Slater Park Zoo
- Interactive map of Slater Park Zoo
- 41°52′15″N 71°20′45″W
- Date opened: 1916
- Date closed: 1993
- Location: Slater Park, Pawtucket, Rhode Island, U.S.
- Owner: City of Pawtucket

Slater Park Zoo is a former zoo in Pawtucket, Rhode Island that operated until the mid-1990s.

== History ==
Early in Slater Park's development, a small collection of animals was put on display just across from the Daggett House. In 1916, this miniature zoo housed only pigeons, rabbits, and deer which roamed in a fenced run. A small herd of elk were in residence by 1936 but not until the late 1950s were any really exotic animals added to the park's menagerie. At that time some of the deer were traded for a lion, a leopard, an Arctic wolf, a baboon, two barbary sheep, and several monkeys. A series of concrete-block shelters with fenced runs were constructed to house the new arrivals and others soon to be purchased from the Ringling Brothers, Barnum & Bailey Circus.

At one time, the City of Pawtucket had an arrangement with the circus to quarter numerous animals in the zoo for several months of the year.

Its most famous resident was Fanny the elephant, who lived at the zoo for more than three decades.

Suffering financially, much of the zoo was closed in the 1990s. Today, while many of the original enclosures are still there, the area now serves as a petting zoo called Daggett Farm.
