= Looff Carousel =

Carousel

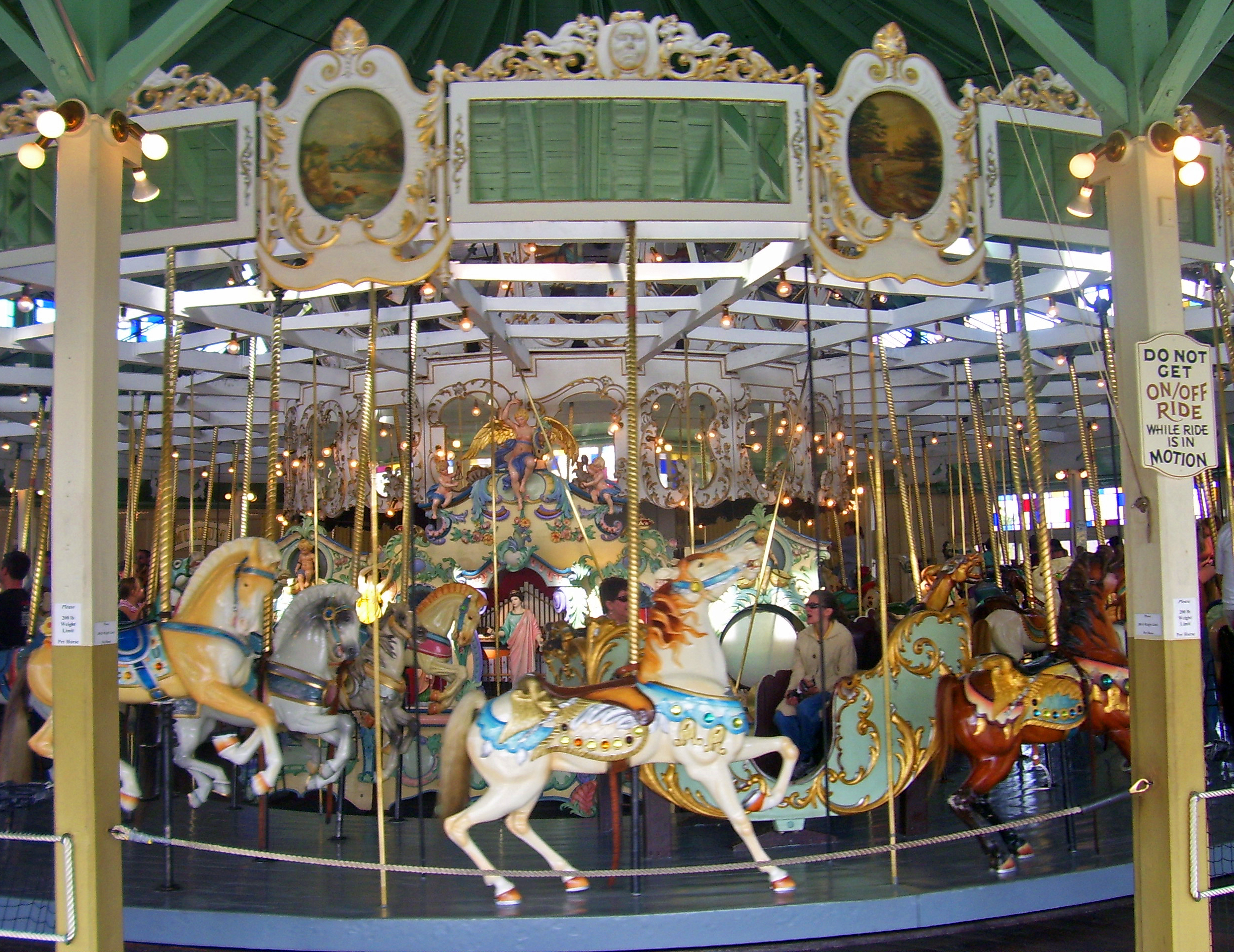
Crescent Park was Looff's showpiece carousel, located in his adopted hometown of Riverside, Rhode Island

Looff Carousels are carousels built by Charles I. D. Looff (1852–1918), a master carver and builder of hand-carved carousels and amusement rides in America. Looff, whose factory was based in Riverside, Rhode Island, is credited with making about forty carousels between 1876 and 1916, only about ten of which survive.

Looff Carousels are known for their lavish decoration, including animals with real horse hair tails, elaborate gold and silver highlights, and sparkling mirrors and jewels.

Surviving examples include:

- Seaport Village Carousel at Seaport Village in San Diego, California
- Children's Creativity Museum Looff Carousel, San Francisco, California
- Santa Cruz Looff Carousel, California
- Crescent Park Looff Carousel, East Providence, Rhode Island
- Pawtucket Looff Carousel, Slater Park, Pawtucket, Rhode Island
- Riverfront Park Carousel, Spokane, Washington
- Eldridge Park, Elmira, New York
- Heritage Museums and Gardens, Sandwich, Massachusetts
- Carousel of Happiness, Nederland, Colorado (mechanical components only)
- Woodbine Fantasy Fair in Ontario, Canada
