= Seekonk Meadows Park =

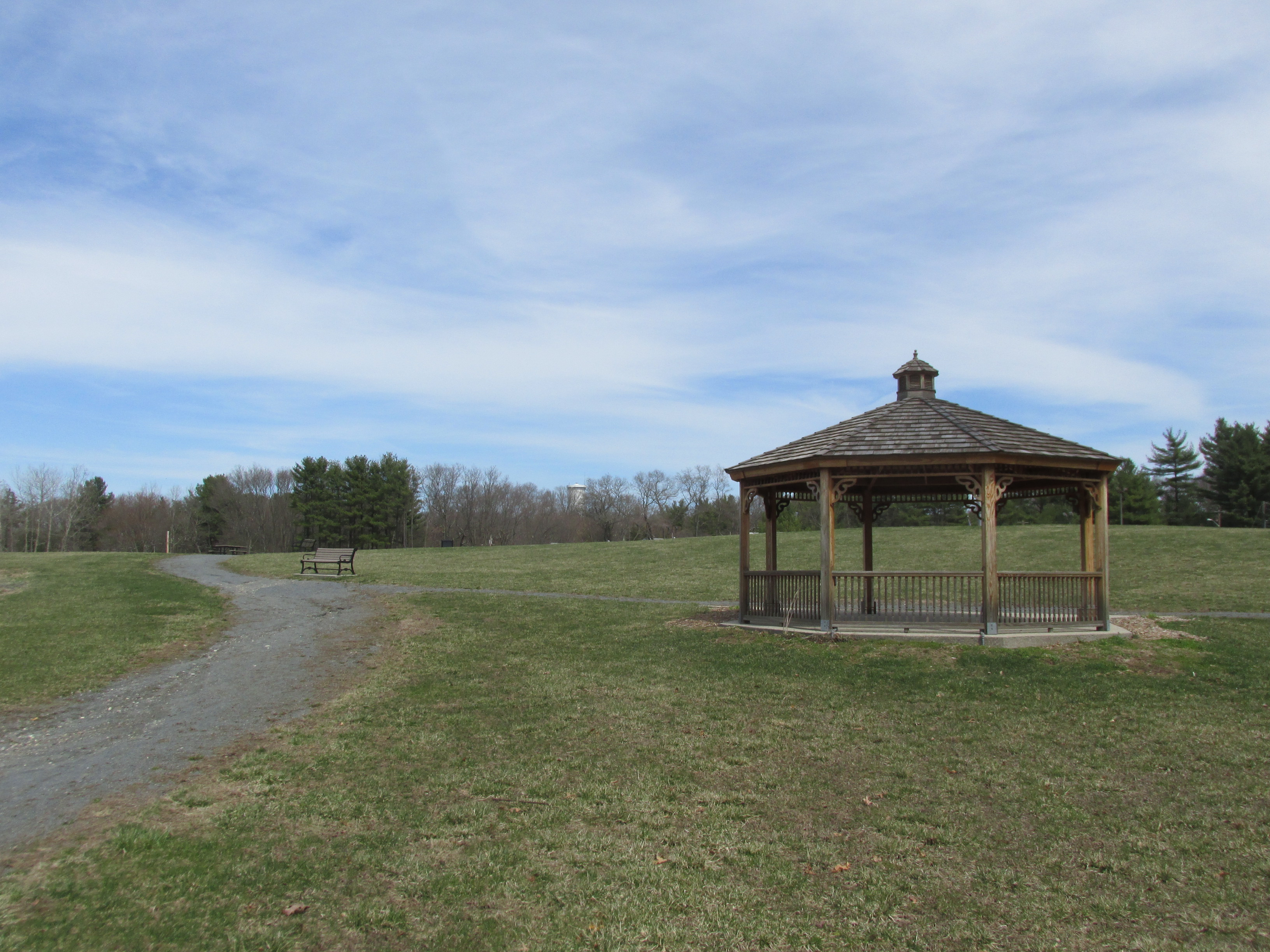
- The Seekonk Meadows Park in April 2014.

- Location within Massachusetts Location within the United States
- Type: Town park privately owned and operated.
- Location: Seekonk, Massachusetts
- Coordinates: 41°51′08″N 71°19′46″W
- Area: 8.000 acres (0.012500 mi^{2})
- Opened: 2012
- Administrator: Local

The Seekonk Meadows Park (or simply The Meadows) is a park located in Seekonk, Massachusetts. It is located in the central portion of the town, on an eight-acre former landfill, surrounding the Seekonk Public Library. Upon its official opening on June 23, 2012, it became the towns first park.

== Construction ==
The planning for the park began in June 2008, and the work on the park began in the spring of 2009. The first component of building the park included preparation of the area, which had served as a landfill years prior. A fundraiser called the "Seekonk Meadows Dinner Dance" was held at the Johnson and Wales Inn in Seekonk on January 16, 2010, in an effort to raise enough money for the parks equipment. The fundraiser was successful, and so the waste relocating, capping and venting the land, drainage work, sub-grades and cover, hard finishes, and loam and seed finishes took place. The final step in the creation of the park was adding a fence along the parks' boundaries, which separate the Seekonk Meadows from the Seekonk Library parking lot. In addition, gravel pathways were created, which run all through the meadows. The project continued into the spring and summer of 2010.

== Opening ==
Construction continued through the spring of 2012, and on June 23, 2012 the park was officially opened to the public. The park contains a wildflower and native plant garden, walkways, benches, and an amphitheater. The amphitheater within the park features musical performances, and there are also a variety of crafts and nature walks that take place in the area. Musical groups include the "Swing Orchestra" which specializes in songs from the 30s, 40s, and 50s. There are also a variety of local music groups in the towns school system which perform at the park.

The official opening of the park coincided with the celebration of the town's bicentennial. During this time, various events were held at the park. Some of the events that were featured include kite flying, barbecues, and musical performances by various groups.

== See also ==
- Slater Park - a nearby park in the neighboring city of Pawtucket

General

- List of Massachusetts state parks
