= Fanny (elephant) =

20th century zoo elephant

Fanny (1952-2003), known late in her life as Tara, was a female Asian elephant who spent the majority of her life in a very small exhibit at the Slater Park Zoo in Pawtucket, Rhode Island before being released to a sanctuary in 1993.

== Biography ==
Born in the wild in Asia, Fanny was purchased from the Ringling Brothers and Barnum & Bailey Circus in 1958 by the City of Pawtucket for $2,500. Fanny became a symbol of the city and spent more than three decades in Pawtucket at the Slater Park Zoo, now called Daggett Farm. While at the Slater Park Zoo, once named one of the worst zoos in America by the TV show 60 Minutes, Fanny was housed in a small barn, with only a tiny, barren enclosure in which to walk and was also chained by her back leg.

In 1993, the city council closed the zoo, but citizens clashed over Fanny's fate. Mayor Robert Metvier was accused of playing politics for trying to keep her there after the council voted to let her leave Pawtucket. A coalition of groups including the HSUS, the Free Fanny Coalition, and the Fund for Animals eventually won her freedom, and, during the night of June 7, 1993, she began her 36-hour journey to the Cleveland Amory Black Beauty Ranch in Murchison, Texas. While at the ranch, Fanny, renamed Tara, dropped 1,800 lb (820 kg) of unhealthy weight and was given something she had not had in decades—an elephant companion named Conga.

Fanny lived at the Black Beauty ranch until her death in August 2003. She was 63 years old, according to the ranch, though other sources give her birth year as 1952, which would make her 51 years old. Upon learning of her death, The Providence Journal ran an obituary for Fanny. In 2007, the City of Pawtucket dedicated a fiberglass sculpture to her, which stands within sight of Fanny's barn.

== Gallery ==
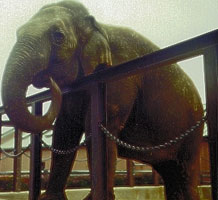
Fanny at Slater Park

Fanny's original bill of sale to the City of Pawtucket, 1958

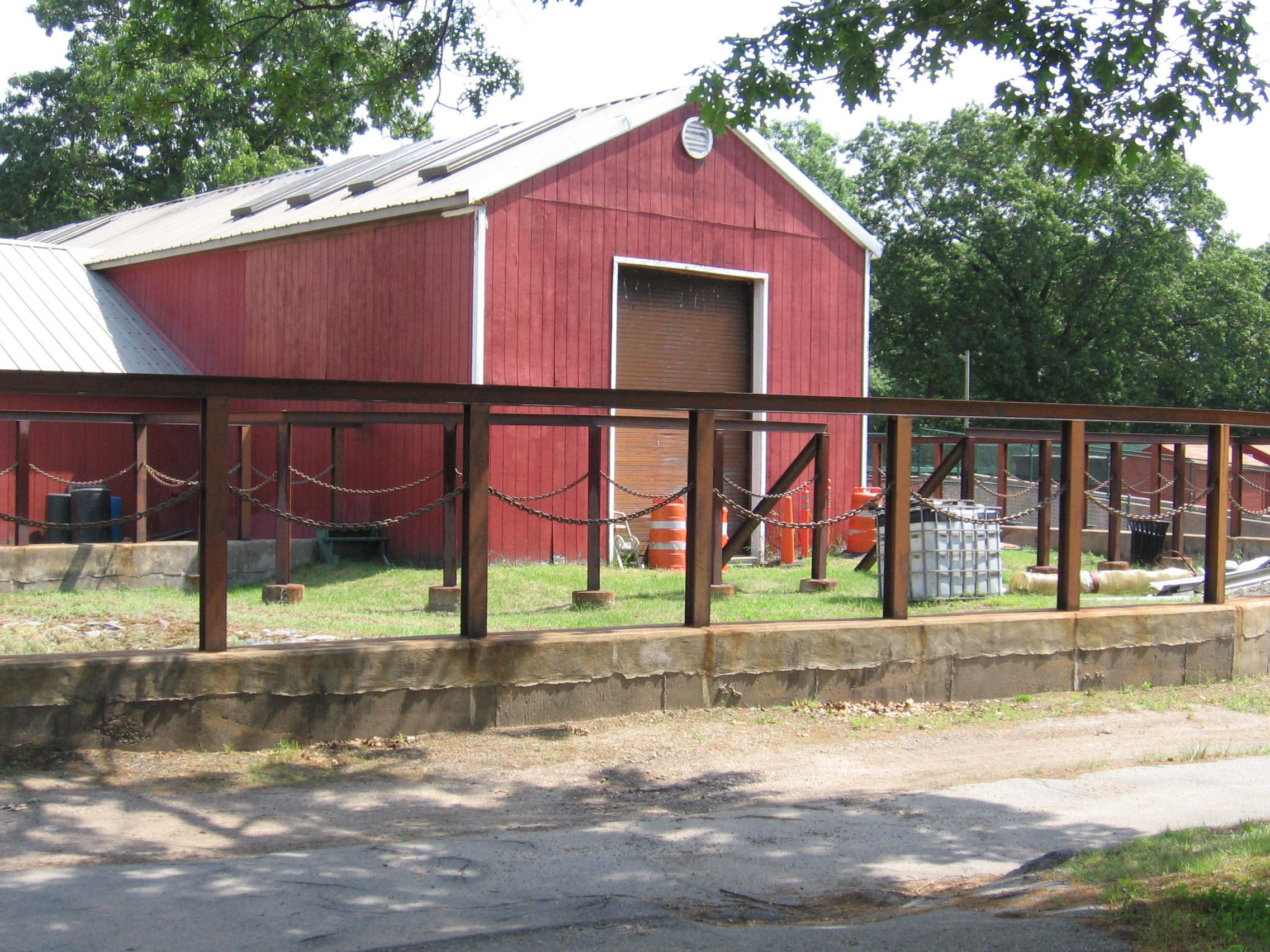
Fanny's now vacant barn & enclosure in Pawtucket, 2009

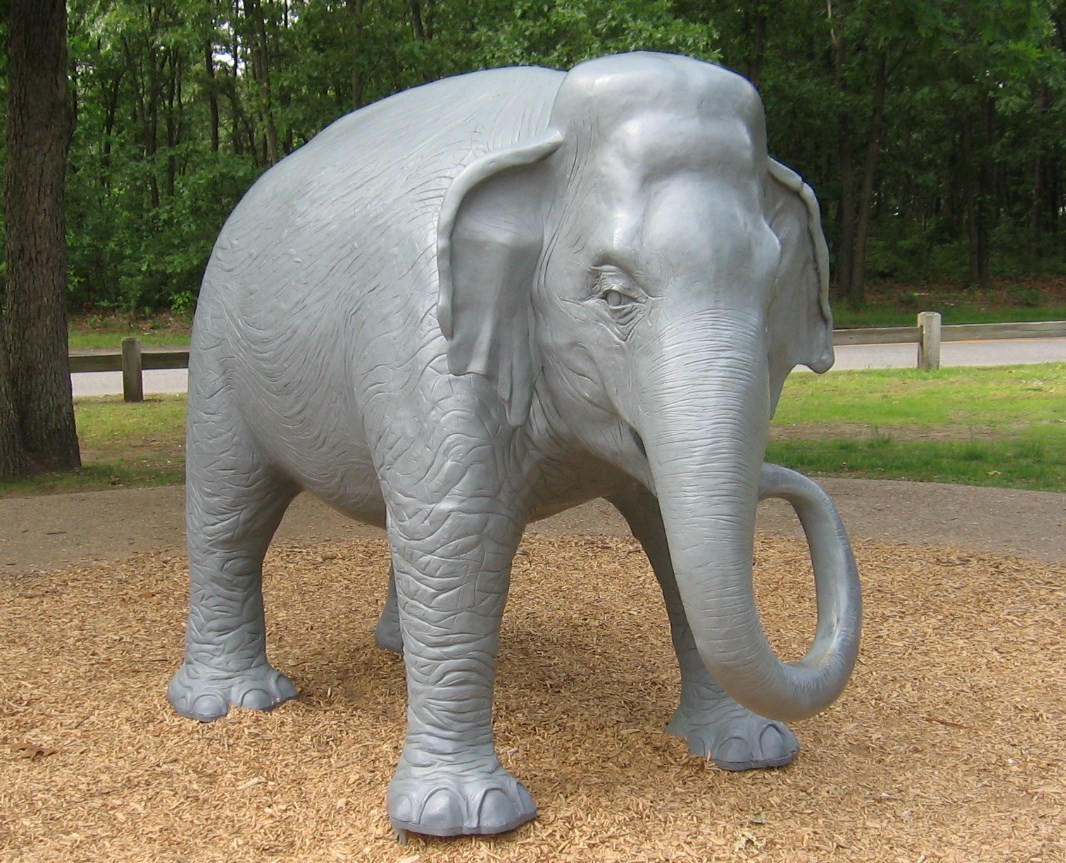
Sculpture of Fanny in Slater Park

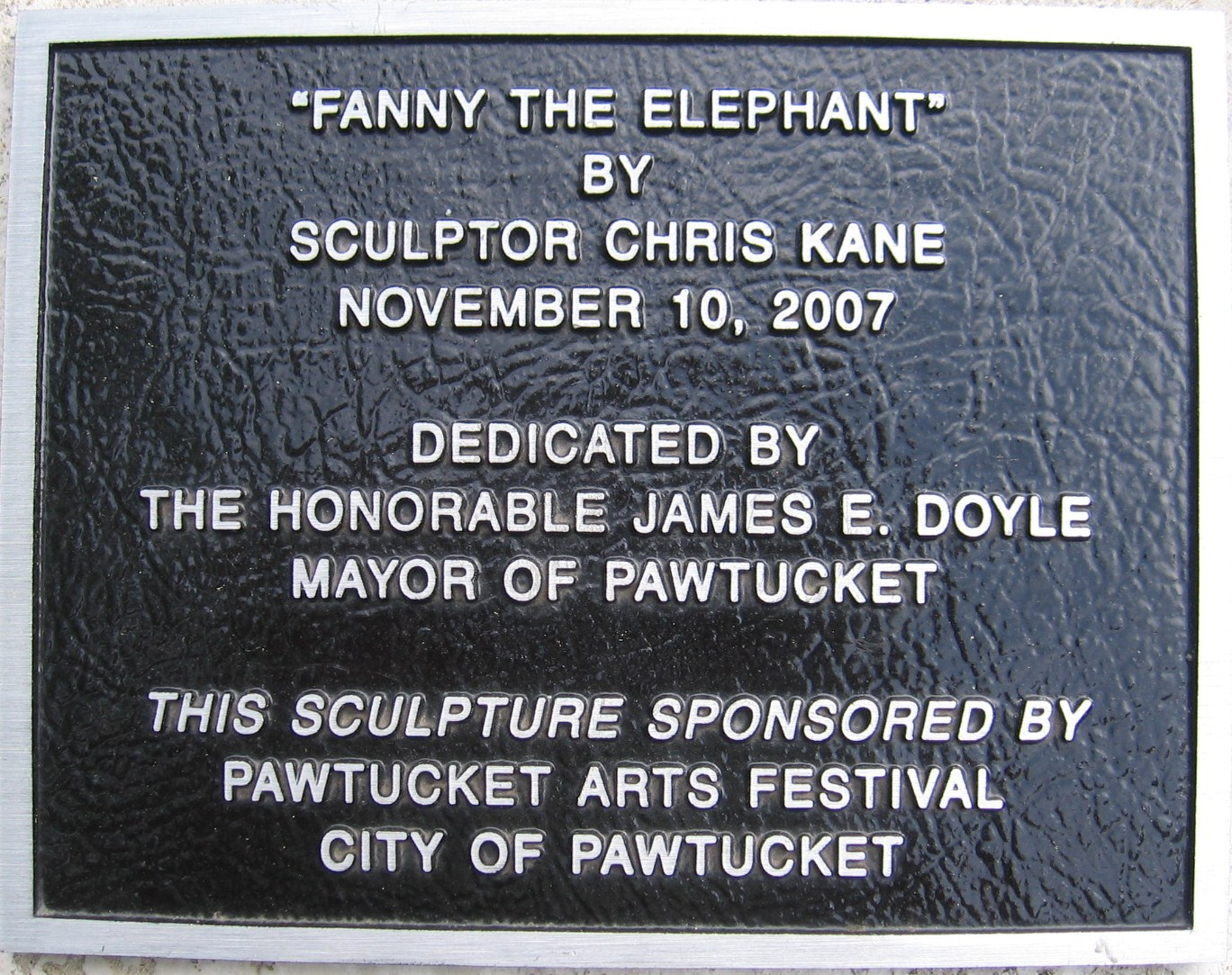
Fanny sculpture dedication plaque

== See also ==
- List of individual elephants
