= Martin Elementary School =

Martin Elementary School may refer to:

- Martin Elementary School (Santa Ana, California)
- Martin Elementary School (Bronwood, Georgia), a National Register of Historic Places listing in Terrell County, Georgia
- Martin Elementary School, a school in the Consolidated School District 158 in Lake in the Hills, Illinois
- George R. Martin Elementary School, a school in Seekonk, Massachusetts
- Martin Elementary School (Laredo, Texas), a school in the Laredo Independent School District
- Martin Elementary School (Green Bay, Wisconsin), a school in Green Bay, Wisconsin
- Martin Elementary School (South San Francisco, California), a school in the South San Francisco Unified School District in South San Francisco, California

Marvin Elementary School (San Diego, California)
