= James C. Potter =

- Born: 1 May 1855; Glasgow, Scotland
- Died: 30 October 1925 (aged 70); Pawtucket, Rhode Island
- Occupation: engineer
- Known for: Business and civic leadership in Pawtucket, Rhode Island

James C. Potter (1 May 1855 – 30 October 1925) was an American engineer, inventor, businessman and civic leader in Pawtucket, Rhode Island. A native of Scotland, he was schooled at the Mechanics' Institutes in Glasgow and was also a member of the 5th Battalion of the Royal Rifles. Potter came to the United States in 1874 and later became a citizen on 31 October 1892.

Potter, also known as J.C. Potter, thrived in Pawtucket, helping to found two successful companies. In 1887 he started the Potter and Atherton Machine Company in Pawtucket. In 1893 he organized and was later President of the Howard & Bullough American Machine Company., also in Pawtucket, which went on to employ up to 1000 people.

Also a successful inventor, Potter was granted several patents, including a Stripping Mechanism for Carding-Machines (filed 27 Feb 1885), the Turret Lathe (filed 27 March 1905) and the Automatic Turret Lathe (filed 11 Mar 1919).

In 1879 he was married in Baltimore, Md., to Charlotte Holland and had six children: Wallace and Clara born in Lowell, and Charlotte, Elizabeth, James and Mary born in Pawtucket.

In 1917, Potter served as the chairman of the Pawtucket Park Commission.

Numerous buildings in Pawtucket are named after Potter, including the Potter-Burns Elementary School (formerly J.C. Potter Elementary), and the Potter Casino building in Slater Park.
