= Pawtucket Looff Carousel =

Coordinates: 41.871623°N 71.343547°W

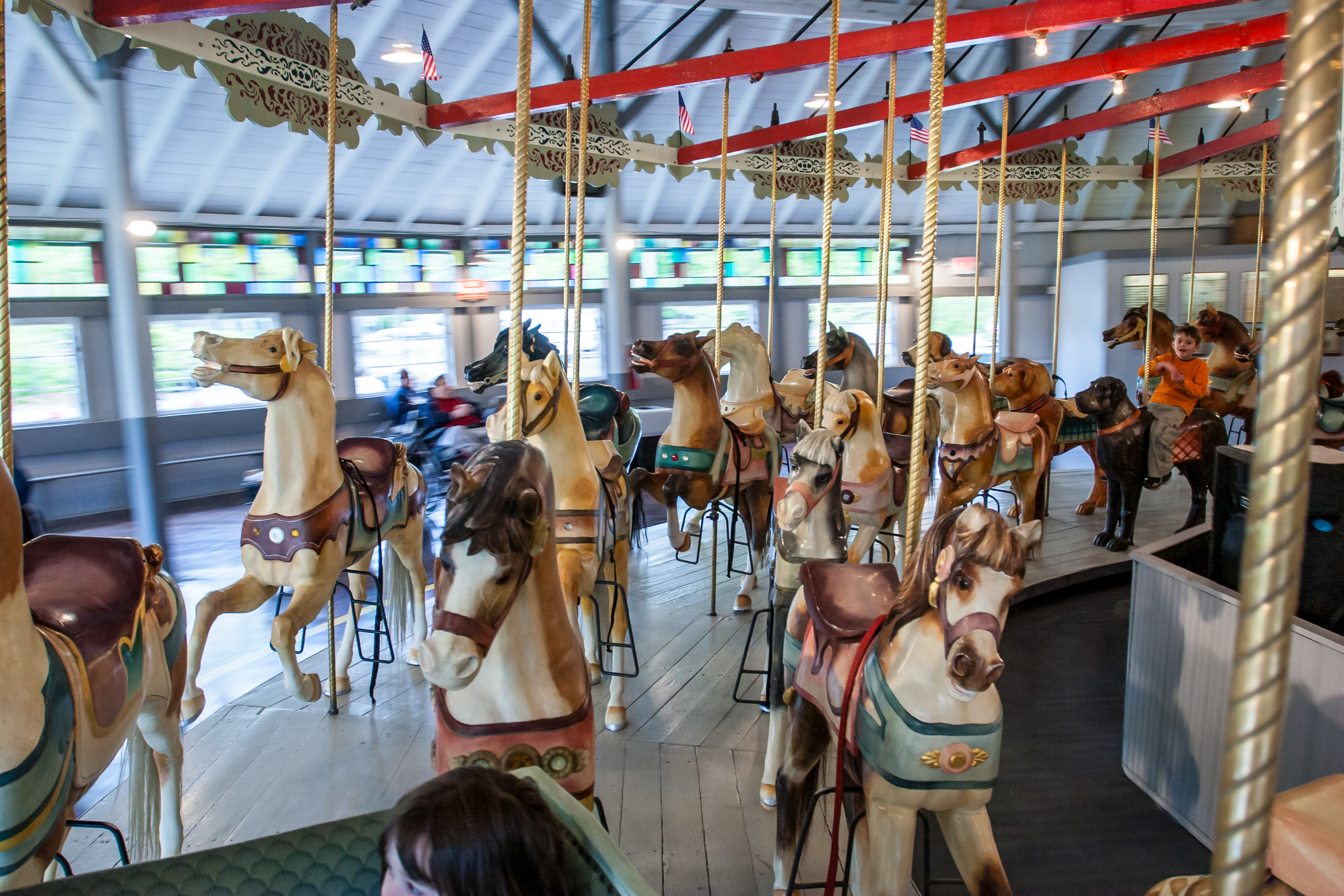
Looff Carousel

The Looff Carousel in Pawtucket, Rhode Island is a historic carousel which was built in 1895 by Charles I. D. Looff. The carousel was originally located in a carnival called Lee Funland in upstate, New York. The carousel was relocated to its present location at Slater Park in 1910. It is one of only six historic carousels in the United States which still resides in its original building.

== Notable features ==
The carousel features 44 standing horses, 6 menagerie animals (1 camel, 3 dogs, 1 giraffe, 1 lion), and 2 chariots. Dogs were among Looff's favorite menagerie animals to carve.

The horses are carved in Looff's "Coney Island" style, featuring slender legs, bodies carved to look as if they are in motion, and expressive faces-- often displaying flared nostrils, open mouths, and exposed teeth. The horses are adorned with Czechoslovak cut glass jewels, small mirrors, tails made from real horsehair, and ornately carved saddles and harnesses; many featuring carved rosettes, tassels, and draped fabric. The building features stained glass windows featuring Sandwich Glass.

The 1990's saw extensive restoration of the carousel, with a focus on restoring the carousel to its original appearance. An antique Model 187 North Tonawanda Musical Instruments Works band organ, dating from 1909, was installed at the carousel in 1996.

The carousel's turntable rotates at speeds well above a typical carousel speed of less than 6 miles per hour (9.7 km/h); it is capable of reaching speeds of 14 miles per hour (23 km/h), but currently operates at an average of 9 miles per hour (14 km/h).

The carousel is the oldest operating Looff "standing" carousel, with animals attached to the carousel turntable in a stationary position.

== History ==
In 1910 the City of Pawtucket leased a small lot just southeast of the Daggett House to John Walker of Providence, a noted carousel concessionaire. Walker quickly erected a ten-sided wooden canopy and had the Looff carousel moved from New York to Pawtucket. The carousel began operation in Slater Park by July 1910. Locals referred to the site as "The Darby Horses".

In 1969 the carousel ceased operations; the city slated the carousel for demolition in 1971 and arranged a sealed-bid auction of the carousel's horses, menagerie animals, and chariots. After the demolition plans were announced, the Pawtucket Junior Women's Club mounted an effort to save the carousel. Minutes before the commencement of the auction, community members presented Pawtucket's mayor with a petition to save the carousel; after the petition was received, the auction and demolition were called off.

Through grants, donations, city funds, and state funds, the carousel was restored during the 1970's and was reopened to the public in 1979.

On July 3, 2010, the carousel celebrated 100 years of operation in Slater Park.

The carousel was reported to be still well maintained in 2024. Everything is hand painted. Twelve animals are cycled off each year for rehabilitation, and touched up with an eye toward historical accuracy. The admission fee is $1 per person. The carousel can be rented for parties and private events through the city's department of parks and recreation. The carousel is open seasonally; on weekends in May, June, September, and October; and daily in July and August. Additionally, the carousel opens for limited hours during Pawtucket's annual Winter Wonderland Festival held each December in Slater Park.

In 2018, the Friends of the Looff Carousel at Slater Park formed as a 501c3 nonprofit organization focused on preserving and maintaining the carousel.

== Gallery ==
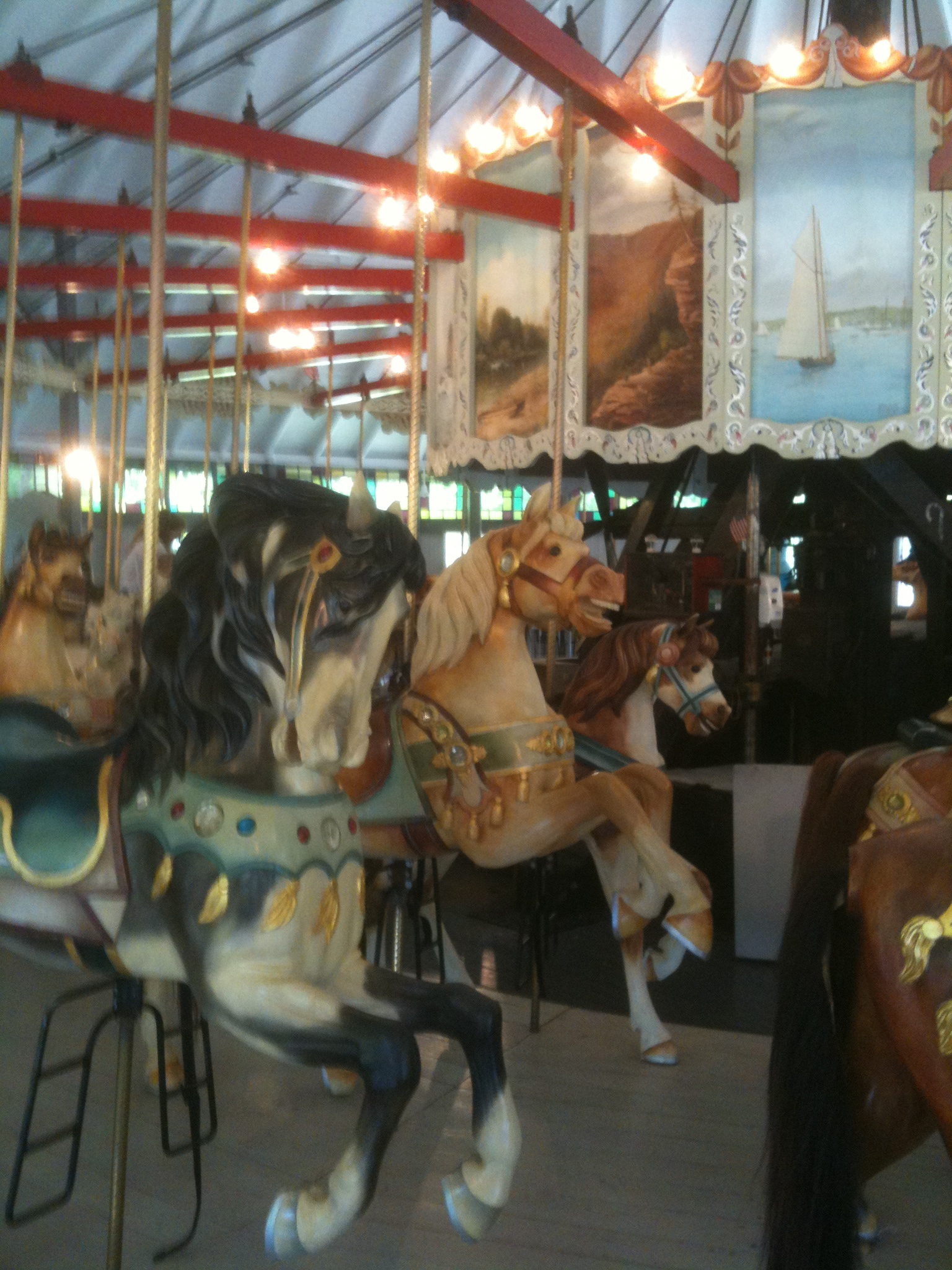
Some of the original hand carved horses.

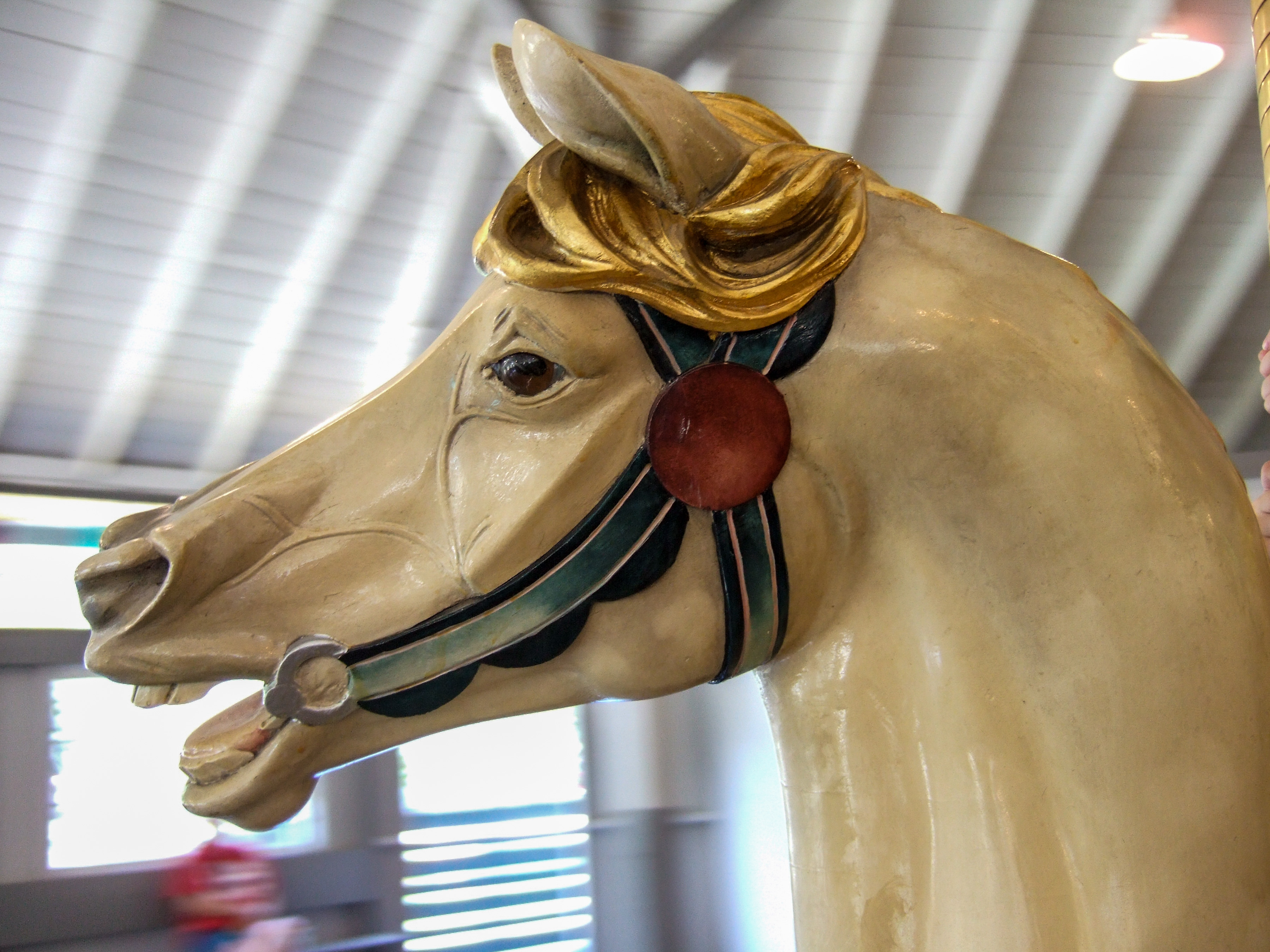
Horse head detail

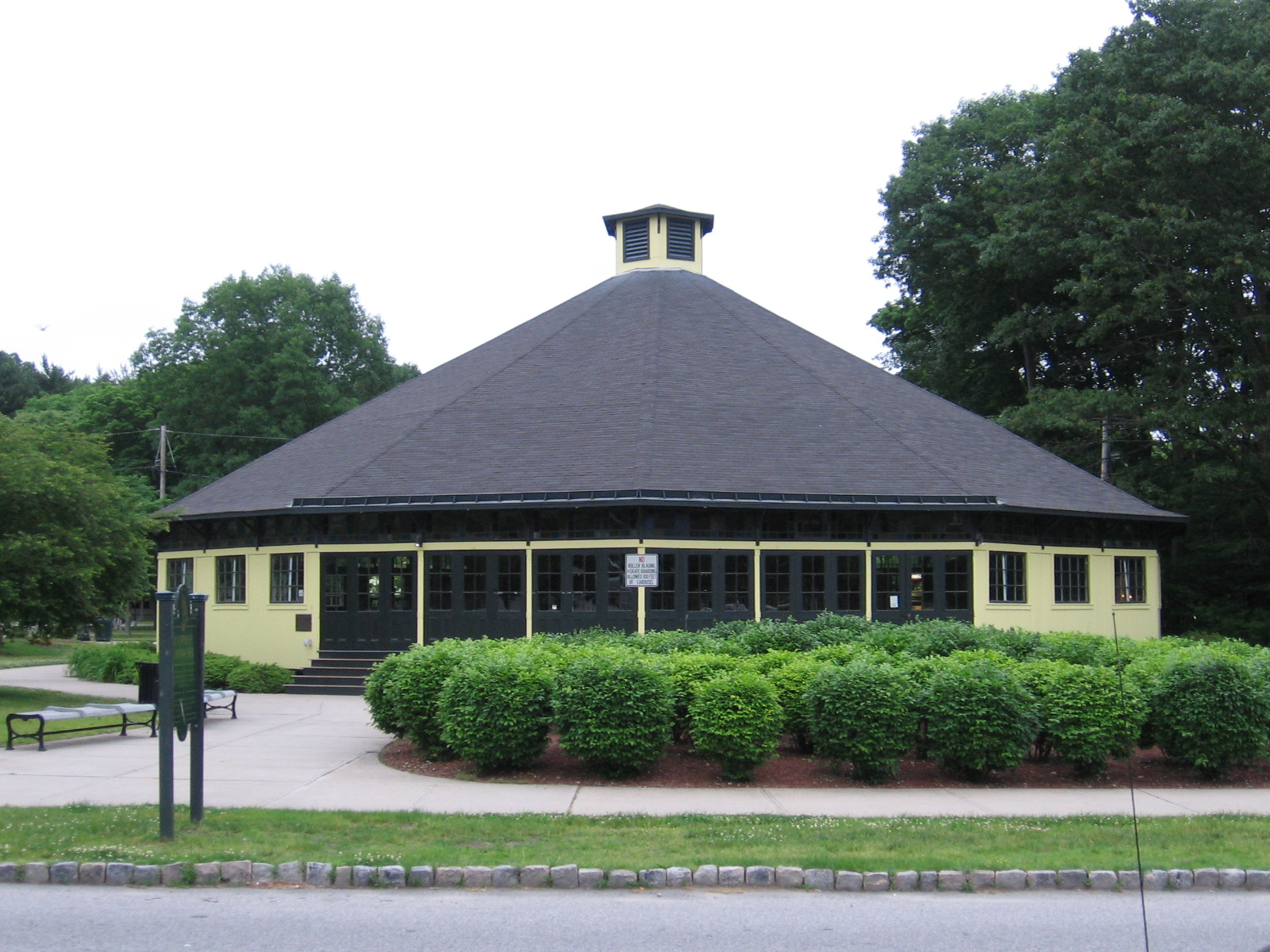
Exterior
