= North Seekonk, Massachusetts =

- Census-designated place
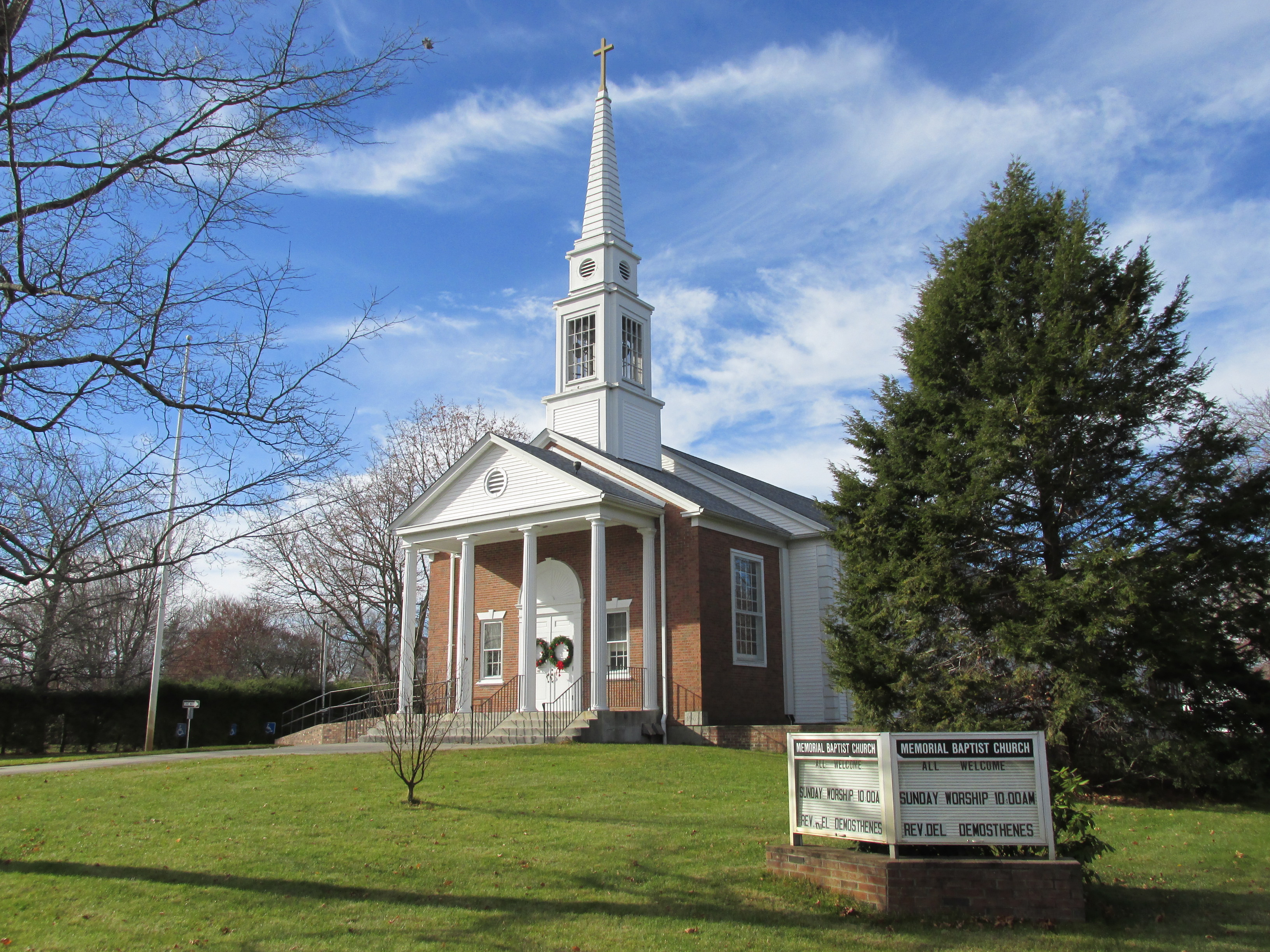
- Memorial Baptist Church

- Location in Bristol County in Massachusetts
- Coordinates: 41°53′32″N 71°19′41″W
- Country: United States
- State: Massachusetts
- County: Bristol
- Town: Seekonk

Area
  - Total: 1.42 sq mi (3.69 km^{2})
  - Land: 1.40 sq mi (3.62 km^{2})
  - Water: 0.027 sq mi (0.07 km^{2})
- Elevation: 85 ft (26 m)

Population (2020)
  - Total: 2,726
  - Density: 1,948.4/sq mi (752.28/km^{2})
- Time zone: UTC-5 (Eastern (EST))
  - Summer (DST): UTC-4 (EDT)
- ZIP Code: 02771 (Seekonk)
- FIPS code: 25-49200
- GNIS feature ID: 1867309

North Seekonk is a census-designated place (CDP) in the town of Seekonk in Bristol County, Massachusetts, United States. As of the 2020 census, North Seekonk had a population of 2,726.

== Geography ==
North Seekonk is located at 41°53′32″N 71°19′41″W (41.892199, -71.328174).

According to the United States Census Bureau, the CDP has a total area of 3.4 km^{2} (1.3 mi^{2}), of which 3.4 km^{2} (1.3 mi^{2}) is land and 0.1 km^{2} (0.04 mi^{2}) (1.50%) is water.

== Demographics ==
Historical population
Census	Pop.	Note	%±
2020	2,726		—
U.S. Decennial Census

=== 2020 census ===
As of the 2020 census, North Seekonk had a population of 2,726. The median age was 44.7 years. 20.5% of residents were under the age of 18 and 17.8% of residents were 65 years of age or older. For every 100 females there were 96.4 males, and for every 100 females age 18 and over there were 90.6 males age 18 and over.

100.0% of residents lived in urban areas, while 0.0% lived in rural areas.

There were 1,061 households in North Seekonk, of which 30.3% had children under the age of 18 living in them. Of all households, 56.7% were married-couple households, 12.6% were households with a male householder and no spouse or partner present, and 23.1% were households with a female householder and no spouse or partner present. About 18.4% of all households were made up of individuals and 9.8% had someone living alone who was 65 years of age or older.

There were 1,094 housing units, of which 3.0% were vacant. The homeowner vacancy rate was 1.2% and the rental vacancy rate was 6.7%.

Racial composition as of the 2020 census
Race	Number	Percent
White	2,480	91.0%
Black or African American	9	0.3%
American Indian and Alaska Native	5	0.2%
Asian	47	1.7%
Native Hawaiian and Other Pacific Islander	0	0.0%
Some other race	40	1.5%
Two or more races	145	5.3%
Hispanic or Latino (of any race)	88	3.2%

=== 2000 census ===
As of the 2000 census, there were 2,598 people, 985 households, and 761 families residing in the CDP. The population density was 759.9/km^{2} (1,975.1/mi^{2}). There were 1,009 housing units at an average density of 295.1/km^{2} (767.1/mi^{2}). The racial makeup of the CDP was 97.61% White, 0.42% African American, 0.15% Native American, 1.23% Asian, 0.35% from other races, and 0.23% from two or more races. Hispanic or Latino of any race were 1.04% of the population.

There were 985 households, out of which 31.6% had children under the age of 18 living with them, 62.8% were married couples living together, 10.1% had a female householder with no husband present, and 22.7% were non-families. 19.1% of all households were made up of individuals, and 10.5% had someone living alone who was 65 years of age or older. The average household size was 2.64 and the average family size was 3.00.

In the CDP, the population was spread out, with 23.9% under the age of 18, 5.9% from 18 to 24, 29.9% from 25 to 44, 22.9% from 45 to 64, and 17.4% who were 65 years of age or older. The median age was 40 years. For every 100 females, there were 95.0 males. For every 100 females age 18 and over, there were 94.6 males.

The median income for a household in the CDP was $42,176, and the median income for a family was $52,643. Males had a median income of $39,438 versus $27,875 for females. The per capita income for the CDP was $20,303. About 2.3% of families and 1.9% of the population were below the poverty line, including none of those under age 18 and 1.6% of those age 65 or over.

== See also ==
- Seekonk, Massachusetts
