= George R. Martin Elementary School =

Coordinates: 41°50′56.78″N 71°19′03.90″W

- 445 Cole St. Seekonk, MA 02771

Information
- Type: Public
- Opened: 1968
- School district: Seekonk Public Schools
- Principal: Jennifer McKay
- Grades: K-5
- Mascot: Eagles
- Nickname: Martin School
- Website: School website

George R. Martin Elementary School (formerly Lena and George R. Martin Elementary School) is an elementary school in Seekonk, Massachusetts. It serves the K-5 student population of the town located south of Route 44.

The building is named for donor George Rutherford Martin (1877-1961). Martin was a Shipping Foreman at the Universal Winding Company in East Providence. He left $135,000 in his will to the town of Seekonk for the building of a school, which was built on land purchased from the Kent family.
