= Seekonk High School =

Coordinates: 41.835°N 71.333°W

Location
- 261 Arcade Avenue; Seekonk, Massachusetts 02771; United States

Information
- Type: Public
- Established: 1967
- Principal: Dr. William Whalen
- Teaching staff: 47.60 (FTE)
- Grades: 9-12
- Enrollment: 505 (2024-2025)
- Student to teacher ratio: 10.61
- Colors: Navy Blue, Columbia Blue and White
- Mascot: Warrior
- Rival: Dighton-Rehoboth Regional High School
- Website: Seekonk High School

Seekonk High School is a public high school operated by Seekonk Public Schools in Seekonk, Massachusetts, United States. Located on the corner of Arcade Avenue and Ledge Road, It serves the district's grade 9–12 student population.

== History ==
The class of 1967 was the first to graduate from Seekonk High (June, 1967). Seekonk students prior to this attended high school at nearby East Providence High School in East Providence, Rhode Island or Tolman High School in Pawtucket, Rhode Island depending on the area of town they resided in or private high schools. When East Providence High School was unable to continue accepting Seekonk students the class of 1966 students from the south end of town attended Dighton-Rehoboth High School. The newly constructed Seekonk High School was finished in time for class of 1967 to return for their Junior year (1965–66). Some of the students chose to remain at Dighton-Rehoboth or other schools. In 2001, the school was renovated and a larger pool was added.

== Athletics ==
Seekonk High School competes in the South Coast Conference (SCC). Divisions in sports range from D2-D4 depending on the sport. The mascot is the Warrior. Seekonk is usually a top contender in their conference in almost all sports offered.

- Fall Sports:
  - Boys golf
  - Boys soccer
  - Football
  - Girls cross-country
  - Boys cross-country
  - Volleyball
  - Cheerleading
  - Field hockey
  - Girls soccer
- Winter Sports:
  - Boys basketball
  - Girls basketball
  - Girls indoor track
  - Boys indoor track
  - Boys swimming
  - Girls swimming
  - Gymnastics (Case/Seekonk)
  - Ice hockey (D.R./Seekonk)
- Spring Sports:
  - Baseball
  - Softball
  - Boys and girls outdoor track
  - Boys tennis
  - Girls tennis
  - Boys Lacrosse
  - Girls Lacrosse

The football team was noted for an undefeated regular season in 2007–2008. A highlight of the sports season is the annual Thanksgiving "Turkey Day" game against their rivals from neighboring Dighton-Rehoboth (Dighton, MA).

The baseball field is split between two states. Most of the field is in Seekonk, Massachusetts, but a small portion including third base is located in East Providence, Rhode Island.

== Band program ==
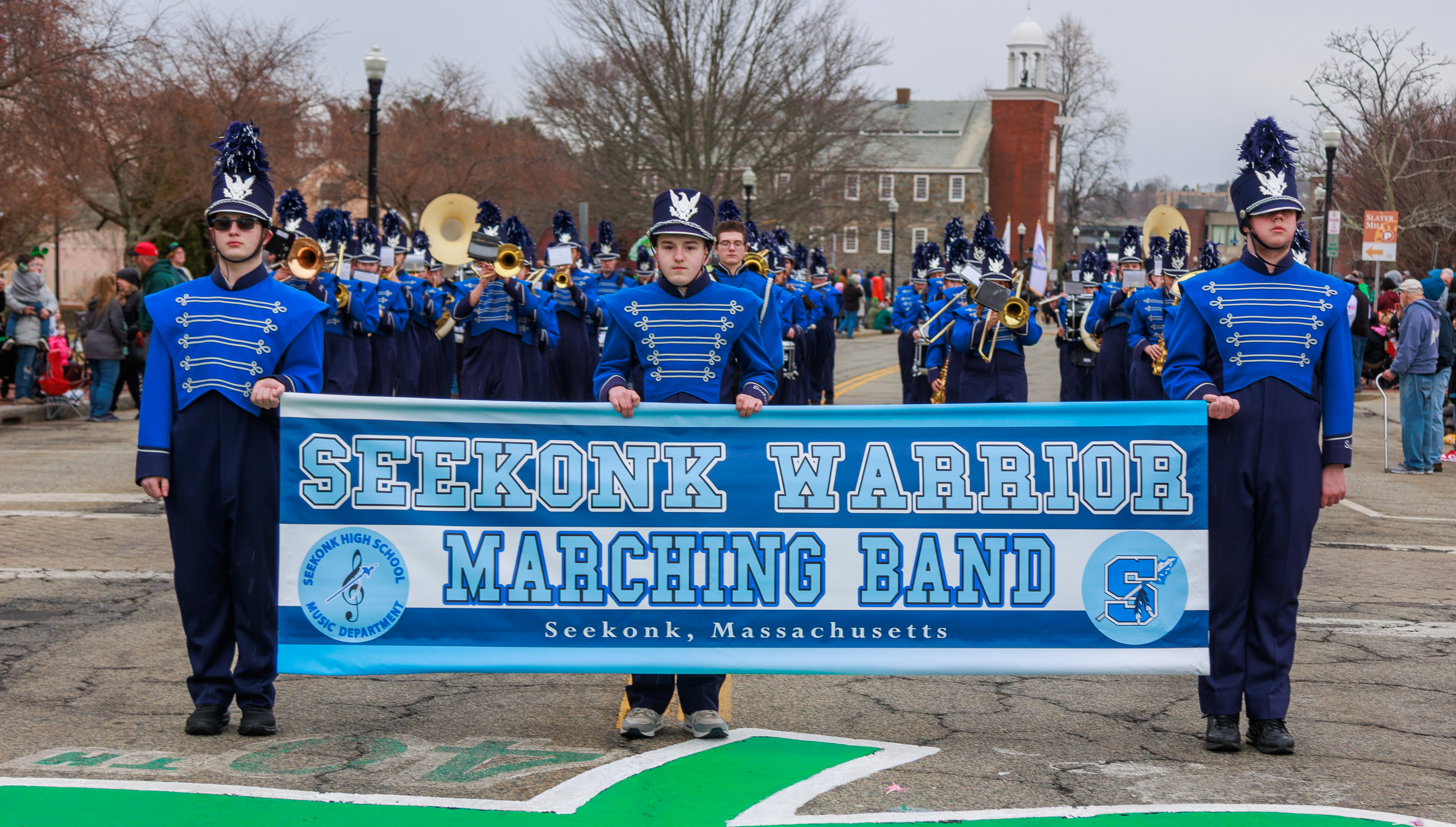
Seekonk Warrior Marching Band

The Seekonk High School band program has received multiple awards and honors. As of 2016, the band has received nine Platinum awards in ten years at the annual Great East Festival in Westfield, Massachusetts; this is the highest honor awarded at the festival. In 2011, the band earned the Overall Grand Championship Award for wind ensembles at the 2010-11 Cruise Festivals; this represents the highest score overall from all Cruise Festival events on Royal Caribbean and Carnival cruises during 2010-11.

== Notable alumni ==
- Jon Blais, also known as Blazeman, was an American triathlete noted for his fight against amyotrophic lateral sclerosis (ALS) and is the namesake of the Blazeman Foundation.
- John Gregorek Jr., middle distance runner
- Cristina Nardozzi, Miss Massachusetts USA 2005
- Latroya Pina, swimmer who was selected to represent Cape Verde at the 2018 African Swimming Championships, the 2019 World Aquatics Championships, and the 2020 Summer Olympics
- Ken Ryan, former Major League Baseball pitcher
- Andrew Skurka, professional backpacker and National Geographic "Adventurer of the Year" 2007
- Jason Swepson, American college football coach (Elon University, N.C. State, Boston College) and former player at Boston College

== See also ==
- Seekonk Public Schools
