= Carousel of Happiness =

Carousel in Nederland, Colorado

The Carousel of Happiness is a menagerie carousel and work of public art in Nederland, Colorado built by artist Scott Harrison. It is built on a Looff carousel base originally from Great Saltair Park in Utah and has over 50 unique animals carved by Harrison from wood, as well a Wurlitzer music player.

== History ==
The carousel's builder, Scott Harrison, was stationed at Con Thien with the United States Marines during the Vietnam War. He said he used a music box, which played Chopin's "Tristesse", to cope with the war, and "would close [his] eyes and [he] would think of a carousel in a mountain meadow".

In 1986, many years after returning from Vietnam, Harrison purchased a Looff carousel that had previously been an attraction at Great Saltair Park. The horses had already been sold, so he moved the carousel to Nederland and began carving new animals. The carousel opened in 2010 in a specially designed building and is open year-round.

=== 2025 fire ===
On October 9, 2025, a fire broke out in Nederland's Caribou Village shopping center, next to the carousel building. All of the businesses were destroyed, including a nature center where several animals were killed. The carousel sustained minor damage in the fire, the third one it had survived since being installed at Great Saltair Park.

== Carousel design ==
The carousel is decorated with 35 ridable animals, as well as additional decorative animals, carvings, and paintings by other artists. Each animal took about six to nine months to complete. In addition to the animals that can be ridden, there are benches and a wheelchair ramp on the carousel to make it more accessible.

The music is played by a Wurlitzer from a repertoire that includes traditional and contemporary songs.

=== List of animals ===
- Bear (bench seat)
- Calico cat
- Camel
- Cheetah
- Cow
- Coyote
- Dolphin
- Donkey with monkeys
- Dragon-shaped boat
- Duck
- Elephant with howdah (small children only)
- Tropical fish
- Frog
- Giraffe with snake
- Gorilla (bench seat)
- Kangaroo
- Lion
- Mermaid
- Moose
- Ostrich
- Panda
- Pig
- Peacock
- Rooster
- Sheep
- St. Bernard dog
- Swan (bench seat)
- Swan (saddle)
- Tiger
- Zebra
