= Seekonk Public Schools =

School district in Massachusetts, United States

Seekonk Public Schools is a school district that serves Seekonk, Massachusetts. It currently operates four schools, and serves Pre-K to 12th grade. The superintendent of schools is Rebecca Kidwell.

== History ==
One of the school district's oldest schools was Anne C. Greene Elementary school, which opened in the late 19th or early 20th century. This school served the town's southern student population. North Elementary School was opened in 1916, and served the North section of town. Also around this time, Pleasant Street Elementary School was opened in the South end. In the 1930s, the district opened Monroe Corners school in the south end. Newman Avenue school was in operation prior to 1923. The Seekonk Intermediate School opened in 1952. A second building was opened at the Newman Avenue School in 1959. Some time after, it was named after its longtime principal, Mildred H. Aitken. In the mid 1960s, the high school students who attended school at East Providence High School in nearby East Providence, Rhode Island were moved to the newly opened Seekonk High School.

By 1968, the elementary schools in the south end were crowded, and the students were incorporated into George R. Martin Elementary school. An addition to Martin School was added soon after construction, along with small expansions to the junior high school and North School. The school administration was moved to the closed Monroe Corners school.

By the 1990s, the district's schools had fallen into disrepair and a district-wide renovation project was started, with North School the first to be completed in 1992. In 1997, the Intermediate School (then renamed Seekonk Middle School) and Aitken School were renovated and expanded. To make room for Aitken School's addition, the original 1930s annex building was torn down. Martin School and the High School were the last to be completed, in 2001.

In 2004, the district's longtime assistant superintendent, Dr. Kevin Hurley, died from cancer at age 52. The Middle School was renamed in his honor. In 2006, the town of Seekonk ran into a budget crisis and, after a town vote, the school department laid off many staff and was forced to close North Elementary School and the Administration Building. Superintendent Buchanan then left, and was temporarily replaced with former Middle School principal, Dr. Peter Andreozzi and then the High School's disciplinarian, Dr. Emile Chevrette. However, in August 2009, Cheverette retired and was succeeded by Ms. Madeline Meyer of New Jersey.

== Schools ==
=== Elementary schools ===
- George R. Martin Elementary School (Grades K-5)
- Mildred H. Aitken Elementary School (Grades K-5)

=== Middle schools ===
- Dr. Kevin M. Hurley Middle School (Grades 6-8)

=== High schools ===
- Seekonk High School (Grades 9-12)

=== Former schools ===
- Anne C. Greene Elementary School (closed 1980)
- Pleasant Street Elementary School (closed)
- Monroe Corners Elementary School (closed 1968)
- North Elementary School (closed 2006)

== Transportation ==
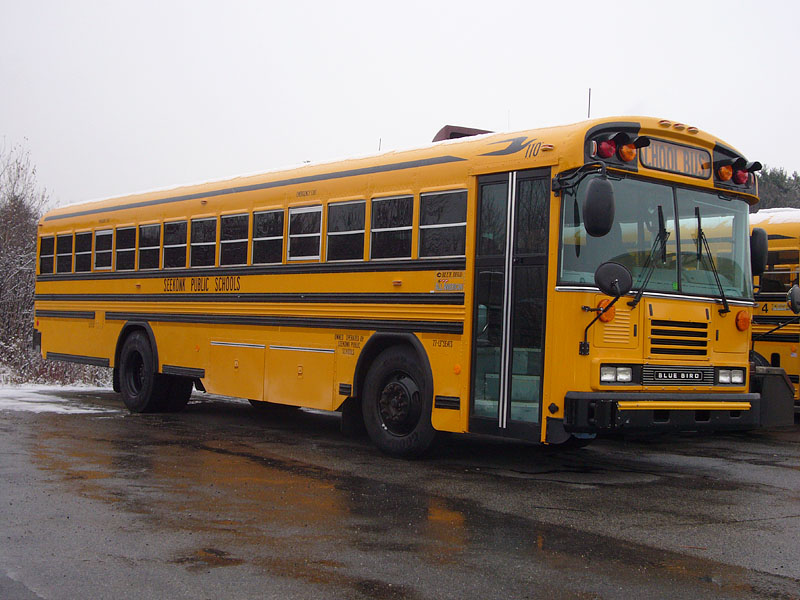
A Blue Bird "All American FE" school bus, owned and operated by Seekonk Public Schools.

The Seekonk Public School department operates a fleet of 22 buses, currently 14 of these are 77 passenger (full-size). Starting in the 1980s, mini passenger buses were used to transport special education students out of the district. Buses equipped with wheel chair lifts are also used. From the 2004 to 2006 school years, transportation fees were required, however in 2007, extra money was allocated to provide free transportation again; most sports fees were also dropped. Starting with the 2011-2012 school year, transportation for the school district is provided by Tremblay's Bus Co. LLC.

== See also ==
- List of school districts in Massachusetts
