= Seekonk, Massachusetts =

- Town
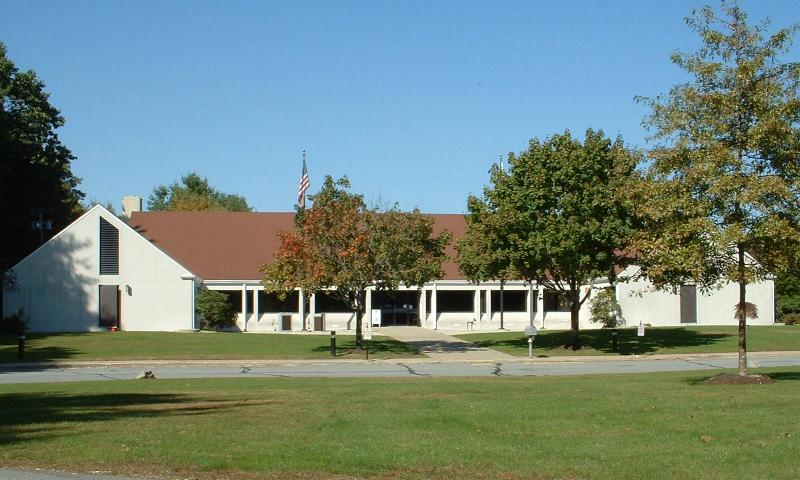
- Seekonk Town Hall

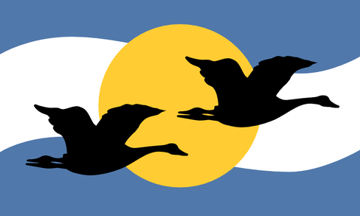
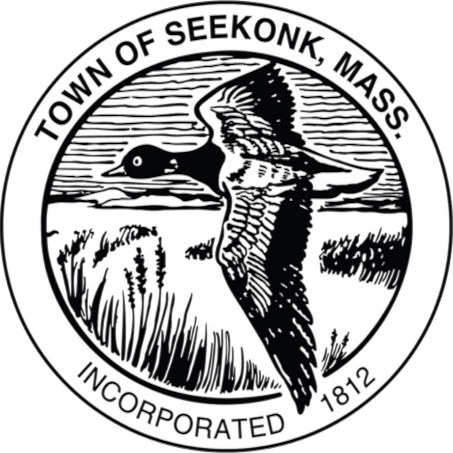
- Flag Seal

- Location in Bristol County in Massachusetts
- Coordinates: 41°48′30″N 71°20′15″W
- Country: United States
- State: Massachusetts
- County: Bristol
- Settled: 1636
- Incorporated: 1812

Government
  - Type: Open town meeting
  - Administrator: Shawn E. Cadime

Area
  - Total: 18.4 sq mi (47.7 km^{2})
  - Land: 18.3 sq mi (47.4 km^{2})
  - Water: 0.12 sq mi (0.3 km^{2})
- Elevation: 49 ft (15 m)

Population (2020)
  - Total: 15,531
  - Density: 849/sq mi (328/km^{2})
- Time zone: UTC−5 (Eastern)
  - Summer (DST): UTC−4 (Eastern)
- ZIP Code: 02771
- Area code: 508 / 774
- FIPS code: 25-60645
- GNIS feature ID: 0618286
- Website: www.seekonk-ma.gov

Seekonk is a town in Bristol County, Massachusetts, United States, on the Massachusetts border with Rhode Island. It was incorporated in 1812 from the western half of Rehoboth. The population was 15,531 at the 2020 census. It contains the census-designated place of North Seekonk. In 1862, under a U.S. Supreme Court decision resolving a longstanding border dispute between Massachusetts and Rhode Island, a portion of Tiverton, Rhode Island was awarded to Massachusetts to become part of Fall River, while two-thirds of Seekonk (now eastern Pawtucket and East Providence) was awarded to Rhode Island.

== History ==
=== Early years ===
The earliest known inhabitants of Seekonk were Native Americans from the Wampanoag Tribe. The name Wampanoag means People of the Morning Light. This name refers to the geographical area of the tribe. Living in the East they would be the first people to greet the sun each morning. The area now known as Seekonk and Rehoboth provided agricultural and water resources with abundant food supplies. During the warm summer months the Natives spent time near the rivers and oceans in what is now Southeastern Massachusetts. In the winter months the Natives lived inland, including several locations in Seekonk. At one time there were three Native American villages in the area we now call Seekonk.

There have been many spellings of the name Seekonk. Some of the various spellings include Seconch, Sink Hunk, Secquncke, Seaconke, and Squannakonk. The symbol of the goose in flight is used on the Town Seal.

=== Chief Massasoit ===
The chief of the Wampanoags at the time the colonists settled in Southeastern Massachusetts was known as Massasoit Ossamequin and had been seriously affected by a plague just prior to the arrival of the Pilgrims at Plymouth. A large number of Wampanoag Indians had been killed by this illness. Most historians believe this plague to have been yellow fever.

Massasoit decided to make a peace treaty with the new immigrants for a number of reasons. Perhaps the most important factor was that the Wampanoags were fearful of being overtaken by the Narragansett Indians who lived nearby. Ossamequin believed an alliance with the English would help to secure the safety of his people.

In 1641, the local Native Americans had granted a large part of modern-day Seekonk to purchasers from Hingham, including Edward Gilman Sr., Joseph Peck, John Leavitt and others. In 1653 Ossamequin and his son Wamsetto, also known as Alexander to the English, signed a deed granting the land that is now Seekonk and the surrounding communities to Thomas Willitt, Myles Standish and Josiah Winslow.

The Wampanoags were paid 35 pounds sterling by the English settlers, for instance, for the sale to Willitt, Standish and Winslow.

Three of the earliest English men to settle in the area now known as Seekonk and Providence were William Blackstone, Roger Williams and Samuel Newman. These men and their followers proved it was possible to provide a living away from the coastal areas. This allowed groups of individuals to separate themselves from Puritan control. In turn this led to a greater diversity of culture and religious and philosophical freedom. It was only by forming alliances with the Native Americans in both the Wampanoag and Narragansett tribes that these early settlements were able to flourish.

=== King Philip's War ===
Massasoit lived until he was 80 years old. While he lived, his people and the settlers lived in relative peace. He was followed in power by his son Wamsetto, also known as Alexander. This chief died shortly after his father and was replaced by his brother Metacomet, also known as King Philip.

In 1675, King Philip's War began and both sides saw this as an opportunity to claim the land for their people and their way of life. Metacomet and his people ultimately lost the war, and the chief was killed by a mixed group of English and Indian fighters led by Benjamin Church. He was beheaded and his head stayed on public display on a pole in Plymouth for 25 years.

=== Incorporation to today ===
For the next 200 years, the area now known as Seekonk was primarily a farming community. Accounts of Town Meetings during these years communicate just how contentious deciding what was best for this area could be. Boundary disputes were common and the land that is now Rehoboth, East Providence, Pawtucket and Seekonk was claimed by both Rhode Island and Massachusetts. In 1812, the border disputes were settled by the Massachusetts courts and the present town of Seekonk was incorporated. Two industrial villages developed to supplement the agricultural economy, with such businesses as the Rumford Chemical Works. But what had become the industrial area of Seekonk in the late-18th and early-19th century was lost when East Providence was incorporated in 1862, taking half of the town's territory, two-thirds of its valuation and more than two-thirds of its population. The town remained basically agricultural into the 20th century, although the Kent Manufacturing Company did make tennis racquets and croquet sets on the upper reaches of the Tenmile River. With the opening of the Providence and Taunton street railway in 1891, Seekonk became an increasingly residential suburb of Providence.

Very few farms still exist in Seekonk. Developers have turned the farms into housing divisions and Seekonk is used largely as a suburban home community for people who work in the Rhode Island and Boston areas. It is now well known for its retail area along Route 6, which includes several different chain stores and restaurants, Seekonk Speedway, a 1/3 mile oval track located along Route 6, as well as Seekonk Grand Prix, with multiple amusement rides and miniature golf. A longtime cinema on Route 6 closed in 2025. Although there has been a great deal of building in Seekonk since the Wampanoags first lived here, one can still see many of the "black" Canada geese which give the town its name.

== Geography ==
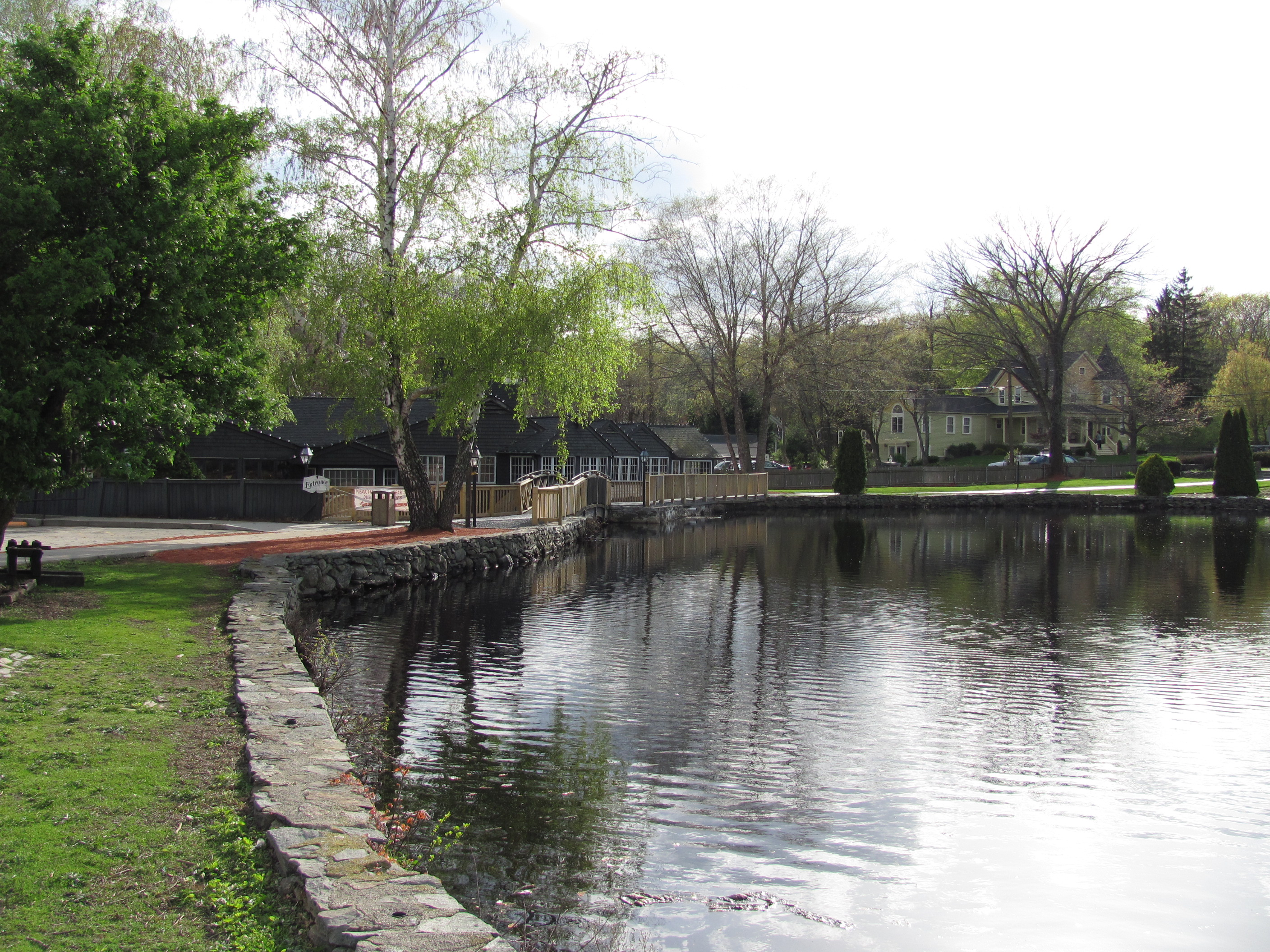
Old Grist Mill Pond

According to the United States Census Bureau, the town has a total area of 18.4 square miles (48 km^{2}), of which 18.3 square miles (47 km^{2}) is land and 0.1 square miles (0.26 km^{2}) is water. The total area is 0.54% water. It is bordered by Rehoboth to the east, Barrington, Rhode Island and Swansea to the south, East Providence and Pawtucket, Rhode Island to the west, and Attleboro to the north. Much of the population is concentrated in two areas; one, the Lebanon Mills and Perrins Crossing neighborhoods in the north, and the other, the southern neighborhoods of Luthers Corners and South Seekonk, mostly located between Interstate 195 and Route 44. Seekonk is just five miles (8 km) east of Providence, Rhode Island, and is 48 miles (77 km) southwest of Boston.

The town has three golf courses Ledgemont Country Club (private), Pawtucket Country Club (private) and Firefly Golf Course (public). Slater Memorial Park in Pawtucket lies just over the Seekonk line, next to Pawtucket Country Club. The Town lies within two watershed areas, the Ten Mile River Watershed and the Narragansett Bay Watershed.

== Transportation ==
The town can be accessed through one interstate, I-195, as well as Route 6, Route 44, Route 152 and Route 114A. Seekonk has its own exit on I-195, Massachusetts Exit 1, Route 114A, which provides easy access to Route 6 to the south and Route 44 to the north. Route 152, while not connected to any other state route in town, is a major route running between East Providence and Attleboro.

From the south end of town, access can be had by the Rhode Island Public Transit Authority (RIPTA) stop on Commerce Way.

From the north end of town, easy access can be had to Interstate 95 and the South Attleboro stop of the MBTA's commuter line between Providence and Boston. That end of town is also served by a regional transit authority, the Greater Attleboro Taunton Regional Transit Authority (GATRA). The town's nearest airport is T.F. Green Airport in Warwick, Rhode Island, near Providence 13 miles (21 km) away. Logan International Airport is the nearest international airport, 50 miles (80 km) away in Boston.

== Demographics ==
Historical population
Year	Pop.	±%
1850	2,243	—
1860	2,662	+18.7%
1870	1,021	−61.6%
1880	1,227	+20.2%
1890	1,317	+7.3%
1900	1,673	+27.0%
1910	2,397	+43.3%
1920	2,898	+20.9%
1930	4,762	+64.3%
1940	4,912	+3.1%
1950	6,104	+24.3%
1960	8,399	+37.6%
1970	11,116	+32.3%
1980	12,269	+10.4%
1990	13,046	+6.3%
2000	13,425	+2.9%
2010	13,722	+2.2%
2020	15,531	+13.2%
2023	15,725	+1.2%
Source: United States census records and Population Estimates Program data.

As of the census of 2020, there were 15,531 people and 5,847 households in the town. The population density was 844.3 inhabitants per square mile (326.0/km^{2}). There were 6,057 housing units in the town. The racial makeup of the town was 87.96% White, 1.40% African American, 0.20% Native American, 2.88% Asian, 0.02% Pacific Islander, 1.80% from other races, and 5.74% from two or more races. 3.59% of the population were Hispanic or Latino of any race.

There were 5,847 households, out of which 30.9% had children under the age of 18 living with them, 63.9% were married couples living together, 19.6% had a female householder with no spouse present, and 10.7% had a male householder with no spouse present. Of all households, 7.3% were made up of individuals, and 4.0% had someone living alone who was 65 years of age or older. The average household size was 2.66 and the average family size was 3.02.

In the town, the population was spread out, with 20.1% under the age of 18, 6.1% from 18 to 24, 22.3% from 25 to 44, 34.2% from 45 to 64, and 17.4% who were 65 years of age or older. The median age was 46 years.

The median income for a household in the town was $116,310, and the median income for a family was $139,621. The per capita income for the town was $50,340. 4.4% of the population was below the poverty line. 3.5% of those under the age of 18 and 10.6% of those 65 and older were living below the poverty line.

In the year 2000 the population was 13,425, with 6,517 males (48.5%) and 6,908 females (51.5%). Popular ancestries of the population include Portuguese (22.0%), Irish (21.4%), English (16.7%), French (14.4%), Italian (11.9%) and French Canadian (6.4%).

== Government ==
On the state level, Seekonk is part of the Fourth Bristol state representative district, including Rehoboth and parts of Norton and Swansea, and the Bristol and Norton state senatorial district, including part of the city of Attleboro and all or parts of the towns of Dover, Foxborough, Mansfield, Medfield, Norton, Rehoboth, Sharon and Walpole. Seekonk's state representative is Steve Howitt representing the 4th Bristol District. Seekonk is patrolled by Troop D (Southeast District), 4th Barracks (located in Middleborough) of the Massachusetts State Police. On the national level, the town is part of Massachusetts Congressional District 4, which is represented by Jake Auchincloss. The state's Senior (Class I) Senator is Elizabeth Warren, and the state's Junior (Class II) Senator, is Ed Markey.

Seekonk is governed by an Open Town Meeting led by a Board of Selectmen. The town has a central police station on Route 44, and a central post office at the corner of Routes 44 and 114A. The Seekonk Public Library is located near the center of town along Route 152. The town also has a branch of the YMCA.

Seekonk's current board of selectmen are: Justin Sullivan (Chairman), Christopher Zorra (Vice Chairman), Adam Petronio (Clerk), David J. Andrade, and Michael P. Healy. The current Town Administrator is Shawn E. Cadime.

Seekonk is typically a moderately Democratic town; Despite this, Donald Trump flipped the town in the 2024 election, marking the first time it voted for a Republican since 1984.

Seekonk presidential election results
Year	Democratic	Republican	Third parties	Total Votes	Margin
2024	48.27% 4,392	49.27% 4,483	2.46% 224	9,099	1.00%
2020	53.45% 4,786	44.33% 3,970	2.22% 199	8,955	9.11%
2016	47.80% 3,663	46.61% 3,572	5.59% 428	7,663	1.19%
2012	51.82% 3,788	46.37% 3,390	1.81% 132	7,310	5.44%
2008	55.80% 4,067	42.00% 3,061	2.20% 160	7,288	13.80%
2004	55.69% 3,956	43.09% 3,061	1.21% 86	7,103	12.60%
2000	56.65% 3,750	36.31% 2,404	7.04% 466	6,620	20.33%
1996	55.97% 3,452	31.50% 1,943	12.53% 773	6,168	24.46%
1992	42.53% 2,735	31.12% 2,001	26.35% 1,694	6,430	11.42%
1988	50.88% 2,986	47.98% 2,816	1.14% 67	5,869	2.90%
1984	41.65% 2,288	57.96% 3,184	0.38% 21	5,493	16.31%
1980	37.05% 2,101	42.95% 2,435	20.00% 1,134	5,670	5.89%
1976	49.29% 2,717	47.77% 2,633	2.94% 162	5,512	1.52%
1972	42.83% 2,257	56.77% 2,992	0.40% 21	5,270	13.95%
1968	52.63% 2,505	43.09% 2,051	4.29% 204	4,760	9.54%
1964	70.99% 3,027	28.85% 1,230	0.16% 7	4,264	42.14%
1960	49.54% 1,950	50.28% 1,979	0.18% 7	3,936	0.74%
1956	26.34% 858	73.41% 2,391	0.25% 8	3,257	47.07%
1952	34.18% 1,001	65.69% 1,924	0.14% 4	2,929	31.51%
1948	37.84% 786	59.99% 1,246	2.17% 45	2,077	22.15%
1944	40.31% 809	59.24% 1,189	0.45% 9	2,007	18.93%
1940	40.07% 783	59.62% 1,165	0.31% 6	1,954	19.55%

=== Fire Department ===
The Seekonk Fire Department provides all fire and paramedic services to the town. The Department responded to 4,662 calls for emergency services in fiscal year 2025. There are 44 career firefighters, consisting of 4 groups of 10 firefighters. 2 Monday–Friday daytime Captains and Chief of the Department, Shaun Whalen.

The Fire Department operates the following stations and apparatus.

Station	Desig.	Location	Staffing	Year built
Seekonk Fire Department Company No. 1	1	170 County Street	Not staffed	1942
Richard C. Banna Memorial Fire Station	2	30 Pine Street	Career-staffing of 1 engine and ALS rescue	2014
Seekonk Public Safety Headquarters	3	500 Taunton Avenue	Full-time career personnel	2005

== Education ==
Seekonk has its own public school system, with four active schools. The town has two elementary schools: Mildred H. Aitken Elementary School (serving the north and central parts of town), and George R. Martin Elementary School (serving the south). North Elementary School closed during the summer of 2006 after 95 years of service due to budget cuts. Dr. Kevin M. Hurley Middle School, named for a popular town educator, is located along Route 152 and serves the town's 6th through 8th grade population. Seekonk High School is located near the center of town. Seekonk athletics teams are nicknamed the "Warriors," and its school colors are Columbia blue, navy blue, and white though traditionally the school colors are Columbia blue and white. The school uses the "spear" logo made famous by Florida State University and, formerly, the Washington Redskins. Seekonk is the southernmost member of the Tri-County Regional Vocational Technical High School district, which is centered in Franklin. High school students may also choose to attend Bristol County Agricultural High School in Dighton, or any of a number of religious schools in the surrounding communities (the closest school in-state being Bishop Feehan High School in Attleboro).

== Notable people ==
- Jon Blais, also known as Blazeman, was an American triathlete noted for his fight against amyotrophic lateral sclerosis (ALS) and is the namesake of the Blazeman Foundation
- John Gregorek, former middle distance runner
- John Gregorek Jr., middle distance runner
- Bill Harley, musician, storyteller, and entertainer
- Cristina Nardozzi, Miss Massachusetts USA 2005
- Latroya Pina, Troy Pina and Jayla Pina, sibling swimmers who were selected to represent Cape Verde at the 2018 African Swimming Championships, the 2019 World Aquatics Championships, and the 2020 Summer Olympics
- Ken Ryan, former Major League Baseball pitcher
- Andrew Skurka, professional backpacker and National Geographic "Adventurer of the Year" 2007
- Jason Swepson, American college football coach (Elon University, N.C. State, Boston College) and former player at Boston College

== See also ==
- North Seekonk, Massachusetts
- Seekonk Meadows Park
- Seekonk Public Schools
