= Slater Park =

Historic house in Rhode Island, United States

- U.S. National Register of Historic Places
- U.S. Historic district
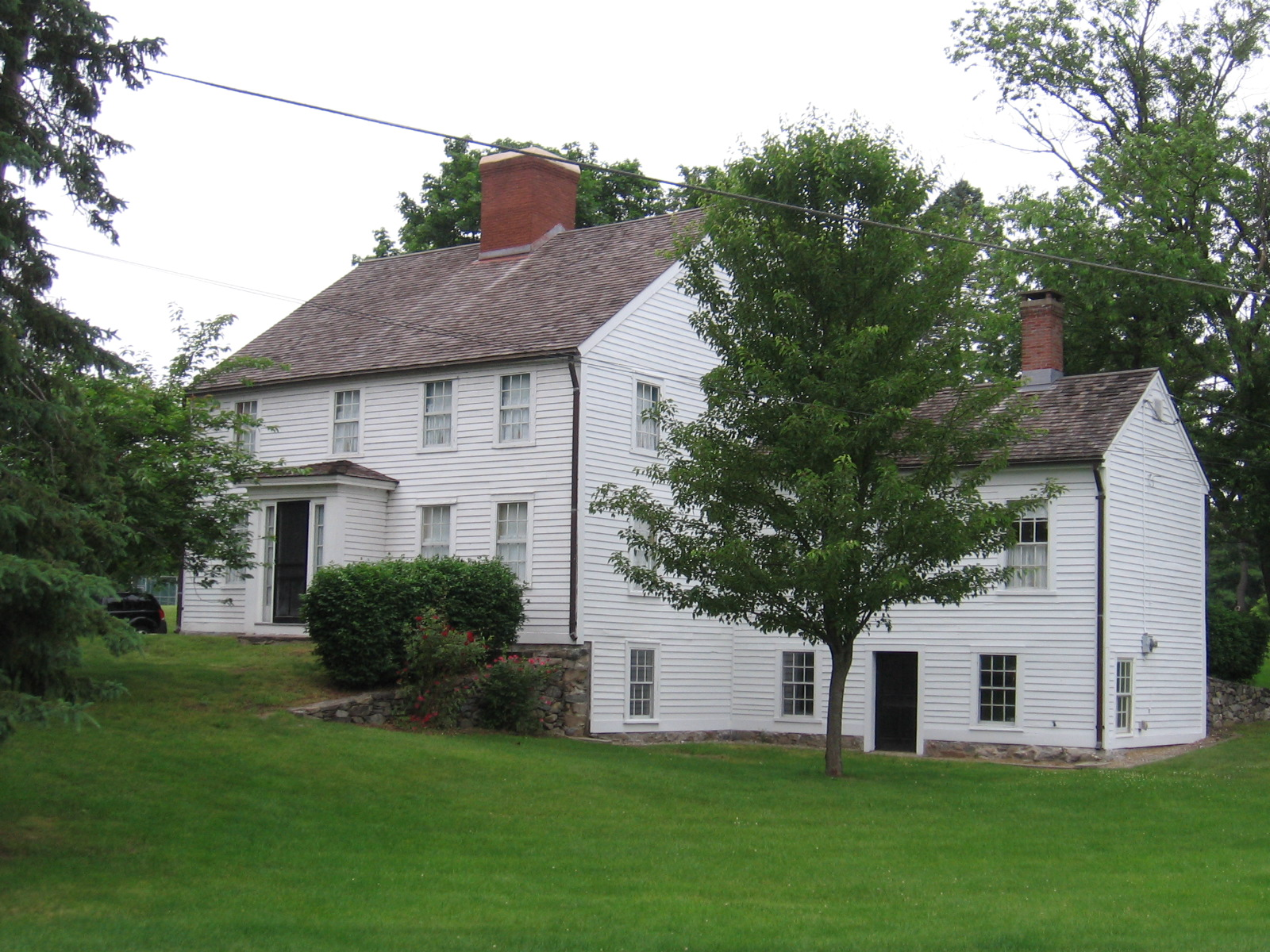
- Daggett House, built circa 1685, is located within the park

- Location within Rhode Island Location within the United States
- Location: Pawtucket, Rhode Island
- Coordinates: 41°52′15″N 71°20′45″W
- Built: 1685
- NRHP reference No.: 76000004
- Added to NRHP: June 30, 1976

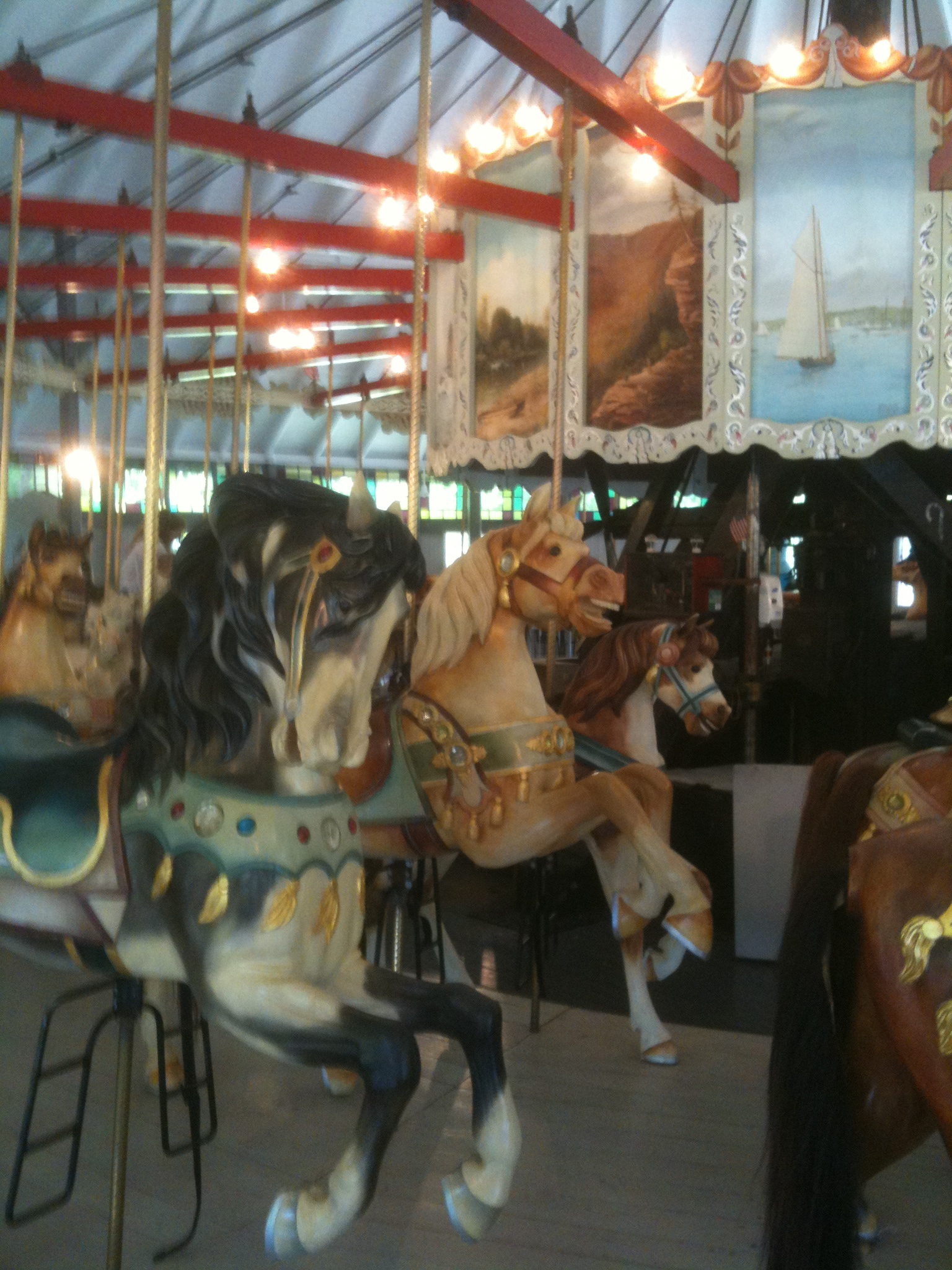
The Looff Carousel

Slater Park is the oldest and largest public park in Pawtucket, Rhode Island. The park is named after Samuel Slater, a famous American industrialist who constructed America's first water-powered textile mill in Pawtucket. The park lies on the banks of the beautiful Ten Mile River and features the 1685 Daggett House, the oldest house in Pawtucket. The park was added to the National Register of Historic Places in 1976. It also features an original Looff Carousel.

== History ==
Covering 197 acres (0.80 km^{2}), the majority of the land (formerly known as the Daggett farm) was purchased by the city in 1894. The land of the original Daggett farm bore little resemblance to the park that exists today. The Providence Journal described the original tract as "...part swamp and part remains of a wornout farm... In its primitive state less than one-quarter of this area was open to the public. The rest was either densely wooded or so swampy that it was impossible to penetrate anywhere without sinking deep into the mud." Initial development of the park did not begin until 1907 when major improvements were made to this situation. All the swamp growth was removed in the process of turning the low-lying areas into ponds. The heavy underbrush on higher ground was also cleared out, while the established pines and maples were carefully preserved. At the same time, hundreds of oak and pine saplings were set out in selected areas, and grass was coaxed to grow once more on the abandoned fields. The result of these programs is a park which today displays a nearly even balance between grassy fields and open woods.

In 1894, the only roadway on the Daggett farm ran in a straight line from Armistice Boulevard (then Brook Street) to the Daggett House. A major project in the first years of park development was the building of a network of winding drives which opened most of the park to the driving public. At the same time, a system of paths was begun, with emphasis on walks along the river bank, the shores of the ponds, and out across a pair of bridges to the island in the Ten Mile River.

Between 1909 and 1917, several buildings were also erected within the park. This early development was largely directed by three men: the City Engineer, George Carpenter; the president of the Park Commission, James C. Potter; and the first Park Superintendent, George Saunders.

== Notable features of the Park ==
In addition to the Daggett House and Looff Carousel, the park contains other buildings and features:

- Slater Park Zoo: Early in Slater Park's development, a small collection of animals was put on display just across from the Daggett House. In 1916, this miniature zoo housed only pigeons, rabbits, and deer which roamed in a fenced run. Suffering financially, much of the zoo was closed in the 1990s. Today, while many of the original enclosures are still there, the area now serves as a petting zoo called Daggett Farm.
- Potter Casino: Built in 1917, the "casino" or "resthouse" was constructed on the shores of the central pond. The building was the gift of James C. Potter, a member of the Pawtucket Park Commission since its inception, and its president since 1904. A Pawtucket architect, R. C. N. Monahan, designed the rest house in the Colonial Revival style, with walls of red tapestry brick, and a low hipped roof covered with green Ludowici tile. Its lower floor opened to the lake and was largely given over to an "aquatic room" to serve canoeists and skaters; the upper floor contained lavatories at the ends, separated by a wide "rest room" finished in oak and furnished with easy chairs and popular magazines. The building now houses the Rhode Island Watercolor Society and serves as a gallery. It is also used for various seasonal events such as Pawtucket's Winter Wonderland.
- Bandstand: Also erected during the building campaign of 1917, the bandstand was erected at the opposite end of the pond from the Potter Casino. Of granolithic composition construction, the bandstand is in the form of a circular open temple, 24' in diameter, with ten columns carrying a steel dome and tile roof. The dome's underside is sheathed in quartered oak, and the temple's frieze carries the names of ten famous composers. The location of the new bandstand, and the layout of the paths leading to it, were determined in consultation with John C. Olmsted, nephew and former partner of the more famous Frederick Law Olmsted.
- Park Superintendent's house: A story-and-a-half cottage, built for the Daggett family about 1874, was remodeled in the early twentieth century to serve as offices for the Parks department.
- Cogswell Fountain: Located in the triangle at the Newport Avenue entrance. Its shaft of polished gray granite once bore aloft a bronze stork while pure water gushed from the carved figures at each side of its triangular base, the fountain was presented to the citizens of Pawtucket and Central Falls by Dr. Henry D. Cogswell in 1880, and was originally set up in front of the Miller Block at the corner of Main and Mill Streets, (now Main Street and Roosevelt Avenue). The fountain was relocated to Oak Grove Cemetery for a brief period before it was finally transferred to Slater Park about 1904. In 1990 it was returned to its original spot at Main Street and Roosevelt Avenue.
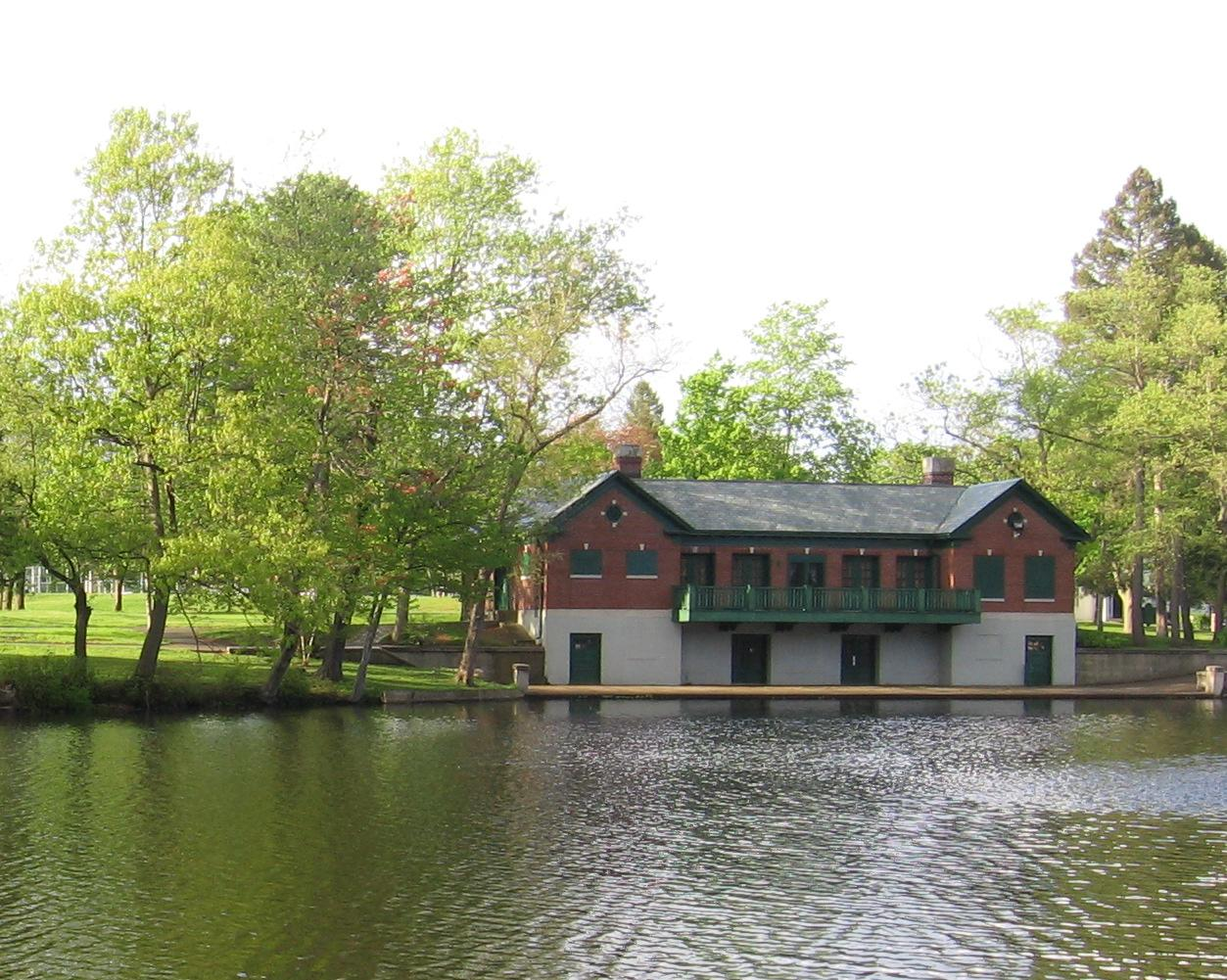
Potter Casino

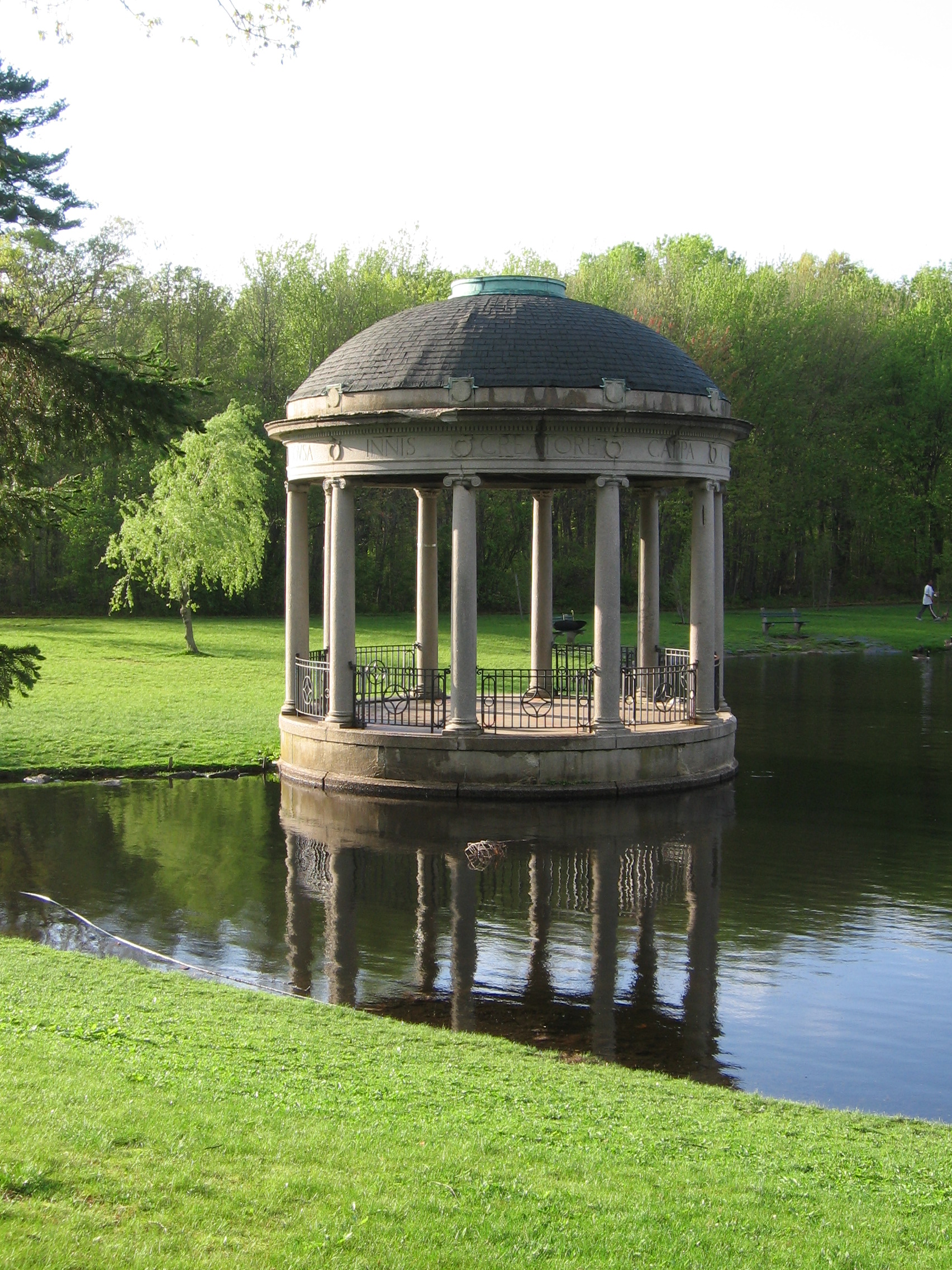
Bandstand

== See also ==
- National Register of Historic Places listings in Pawtucket, Rhode Island
- Pawtucket Looff Carousel
- Seekonk Meadows Park - a nearby park in Seekonk, Massachusetts
