= Daggett House =

- U.S. Historic district – Contributing property
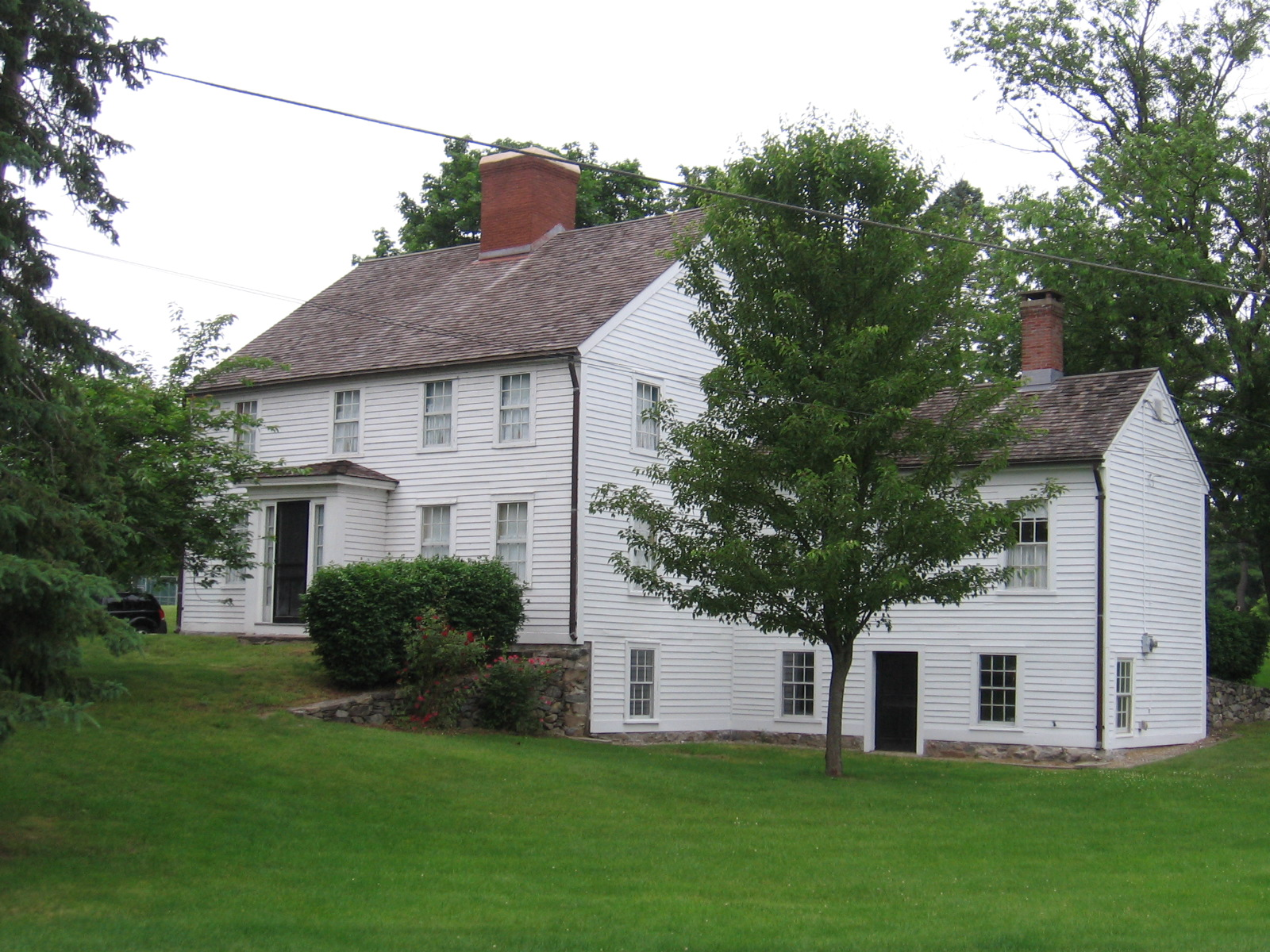
- Daggett House in 2009

- Location within Rhode Island Location within the United States
- Location: Armistice Blvd., Pawtucket, Rhode Island
- Coordinates: 41°53′19.2″N 71°20′38.6″W
- Area: 197 acres (80 ha)
- Built: 1685
- Part of: Slater Park (ID76000004)
- Added to NRHP: June 30, 1976

The Daggett House is an historic house in Slater Park in Pawtucket, Rhode Island. The house is the oldest standing house in Pawtucket and one of the oldest surviving buildings in the state.

== History ==
The large farmhouse was built around 1685 for John Daggett, Jr. near the previous site of his father's house. The father's house is said to have been destroyed during King Philip's War.

The house was probably inherited in 1707 by Daggett's eldest surviving son, Joseph Daggett, a doctor of medicine, a wheelwright, and a miller. The farm is presumed to have been inherited by Joseph's son Israel, a cooper, in 1727. The house passed to various members of the Daggett family by inheritance or purchase, ending with Jefferson Daggett and his eldest son, Edwin O. Daggett. They continued to farm the property at least until 1870, when Jefferson died. The farm went into decline after the death of Jefferson Dagget, and was purchased as a "wornout farm" by the city in 1894.

The house was restored by the Daughters of the American Revolution starting in 1902 and opened as a museum in 1905. Advance notice is required for a tour. Contact the park office M-F 8:30-4:30 or the Pawtucket Chapter of the DAR 722-6931 or 724-4758 as per the information posted on the exterior of the house July 2, 2017.

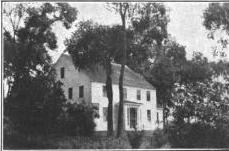
Daggett House in 1905

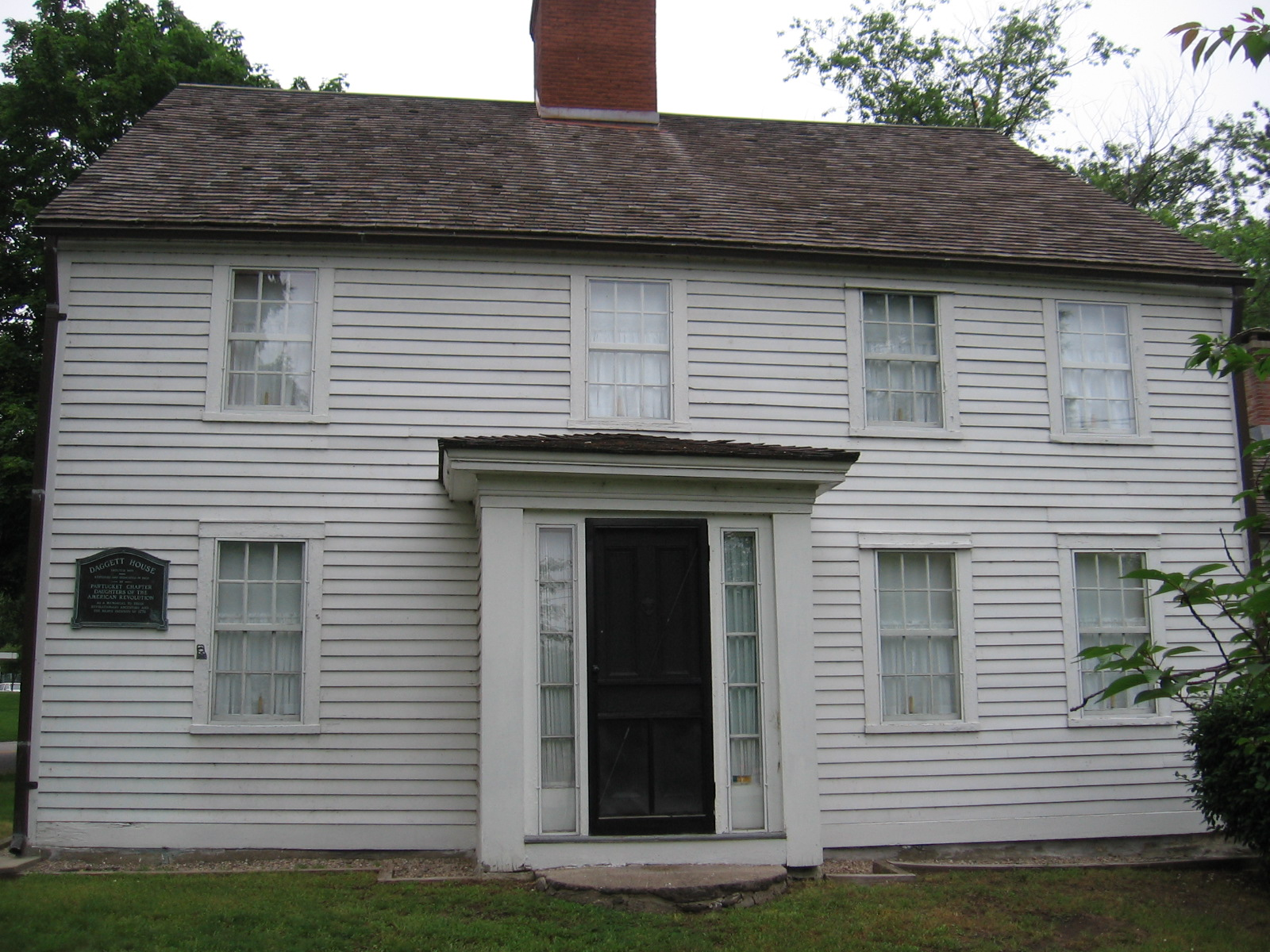
Daggett House in 2009

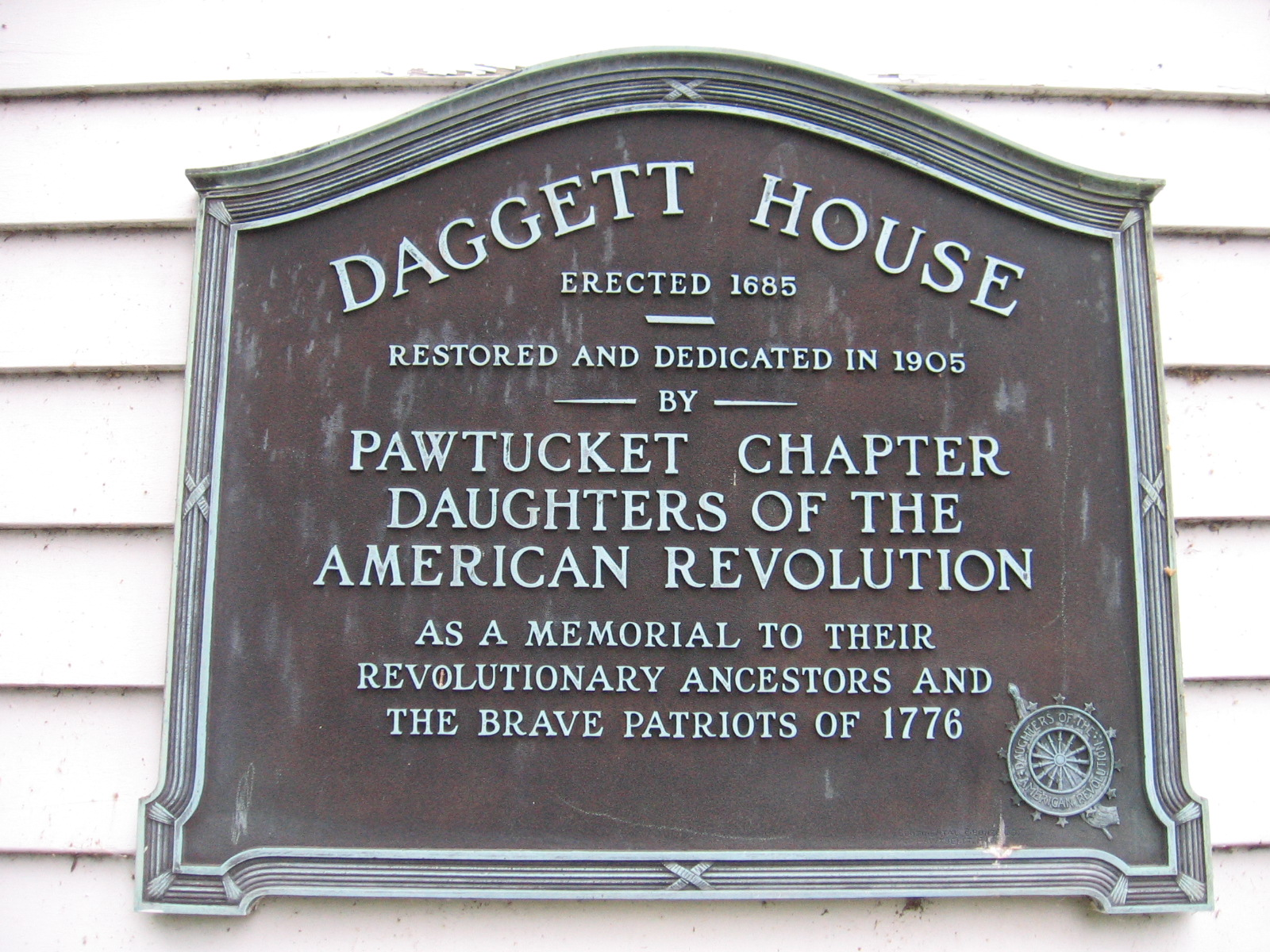
Plaque on the house in 2009
