= National Register of Historic Places listings in Little Compton, Rhode Island =

This is a list of Registered Historic Places in Little Compton, Rhode Island, which has been transferred from and is an integral part of National Register of Historic Places listings in Newport County, Rhode Island.

Contents: Counties in Rhode Island

Bristol | Kent | Newport | Providence | Washington

This National Park Service list is complete through NPS recent listings posted April 3, 2026.

	Name on the Register	Image	Date listed	Location	City or town	Description
1	Friends Meeting House and Cemetery	Friends Meeting House and Cemetery	March 6, 2007 (#07000124)	234 W. Main Rd. 41°31′33″N 71°11′38″W	Little Compton	
2	Little Compton Common Historic District	Little Compton Common Historic District	May 3, 1974 (#74000041)	Little Compton; 41°30′33″N 71°10′21″W	Little Compton	
3	Rhode Island Red	Rhode Island Red	October 19, 2001 (#01000465)	Junction of Adamsville, Westport Harbor, Main and Stone Church Rds. 41°33′13″N 71°07′44″W	Little Compton	part of the Outdoor Sculpture of Rhode Island Multiple Property Submission (MPS)
4	Sakonnet Light Station	Sakonnet Light Station	February 10, 1983 (#83000179)	South of Little Compton on Little Cormorant Rock; 41°27′11″N 71°12′11″W	Little Compton	part of the Lighthouses of Rhode Island TR
5	Stone House Inn	Stone House Inn	April 2, 2008 (#08000255)	122 Sakonnet Rd. 41°27′58″N 71°11′11″W	Little Compton	
6	William Whalley Homestead	William Whalley Homestead	August 3, 1988 (#88001127)	33 Burchard Ave. 41°32′37″N 71°10′09″W	Little Compton	
7	Wilbor House	Wilbor House	March 6, 2007 (#07000125)	548 W. Main Rd. 41°29′43″N 71°11′11″W	Little Compton	

== See also ==
- National Register of Historic Places listings in Newport County, Rhode Island
- List of National Historic Landmarks in Rhode Island
