= West Island (Rhode Island) =

Island and Former Fishing Club

Geography
- Coordinates: 41°26′59″N 71°11′54″W
- Area: 0.015 sq mi (0.039 km^{2})
- Highest elevation: 16 ft (4.9 m)

Administration
- United States
- State: Rhode Island
- County: Newport County

West Island is a 9.6 acre (0.015 sq mi) uninhabited island located approximately 0.25 miles (0.4 km) off the coast of Sakonnet Point and roughly 900 feet (274.3 m) east of the Sakonnet Point Lighthouse in Little Compton, Rhode Island, United States. The island is the former site of the West Island Club, an exclusive sport fishing club and hotel, between 1865 and 1906. The island is currently managed by the Sakonnet Preservation Association for use as a nesting sanctuary for shorebirds.

Three stone columns and a chimney are the only surviving ruins of the former West Island Club that remain on the island. Public access to the island is permitted during the nesting off-season.

== History ==
West Island was purchased by the West Island Association in 1853 for the purposes of establishing a sporting and leisure club on the island. The West Island Club opened in 1865 and primarily appealed to elite socialites for its striped bass fishing and luxury amenities. During this time, West Island consisted of a two-story hotel and clubhouse complex. Membership was capped at thirty individuals at any given time; notable visitors to the West Island Club include Grover Cleveland, J.P. Morgan, Cornelius Vanderbilt, Chester A. Arthur and Charles Tiffany.

The West Island Club ceased operations in 1906 due to declining membership. West Island was sold to Joseph Wainwright in 1907 who subsequently donated the land to the Episcopal Diocese of Rhode Island; the now-vacated island was later sold to Marion Eppley in 1929. The remaining structures on West Island sustained damage by arson before being mostly destroyed by the Hurricane of 1938.

West Island was purchased by Jessie Lloyd O'Connor in 1949 who donated the island to the Sakonnet Preservation Association in 1983 for preservation and conservation purposes.
