= Sakonnet =

Native Americans in the United States

Regions with significant populations
- Little Compton, Rhode Island

Languages
- Massachusett language

Related ethnic groups
- Wampanoag people

The Sakonnet people are Native Americans in the United States, related to the Wampanoag people who spoke a dialect of the Massachusett language. The tribal name was applied to Little Compton, Rhode Island's Sakonnet River, Sakonnet Harbor, and other geographic features.

== Alternate spellings ==
The spelling "Sakonnet" has become accepted because of long use on maps, but the name is sometimes written as 'Sekonnet', 'Seaconnet', 'Sakonnet', 'Saconnet', 'Sakonett', or 'Segonet'.
