= Little Compton Common Historic District =

Historic church in Rhode Island, United States

Coordinates: 41.50949°N 71.17194°W

- Little Compton Commons Historic District
- U.S. National Register of Historic Places
- U.S. Historic district
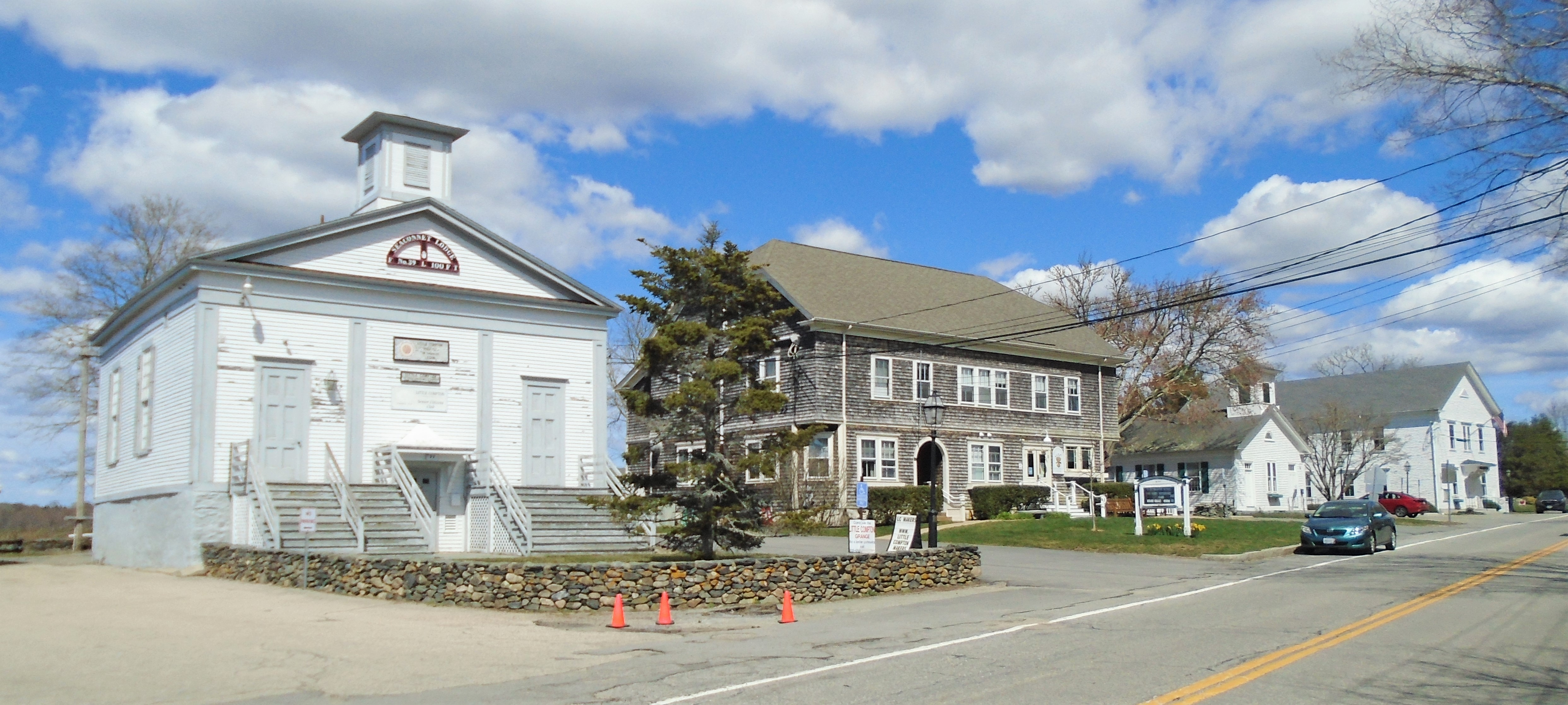
- Buildings on School House Lane in the district: Sakonnet Lodge (formerly the Methodist Church), Community Center (Grange Hall), former schoolhouse, Town Hall (2021)

- Location within Rhode Island Location within the United States
- Location: Little Compton, Rhode Island
- Architectural style: Greek Revival; Early and Late Victorian others
- NRHP reference No.: 74000041
- Added to NRHP: May 3, 1974

The Little Compton Commons Historic District, or Little Compton Commons, is a historic district in Little Compton, Rhode Island. It is a triangular area roughly bounded by School House Lane to the north, South Commons Road to the east, and Meeting House Lane to the south. Properties continue to the west on West Road.

== History ==
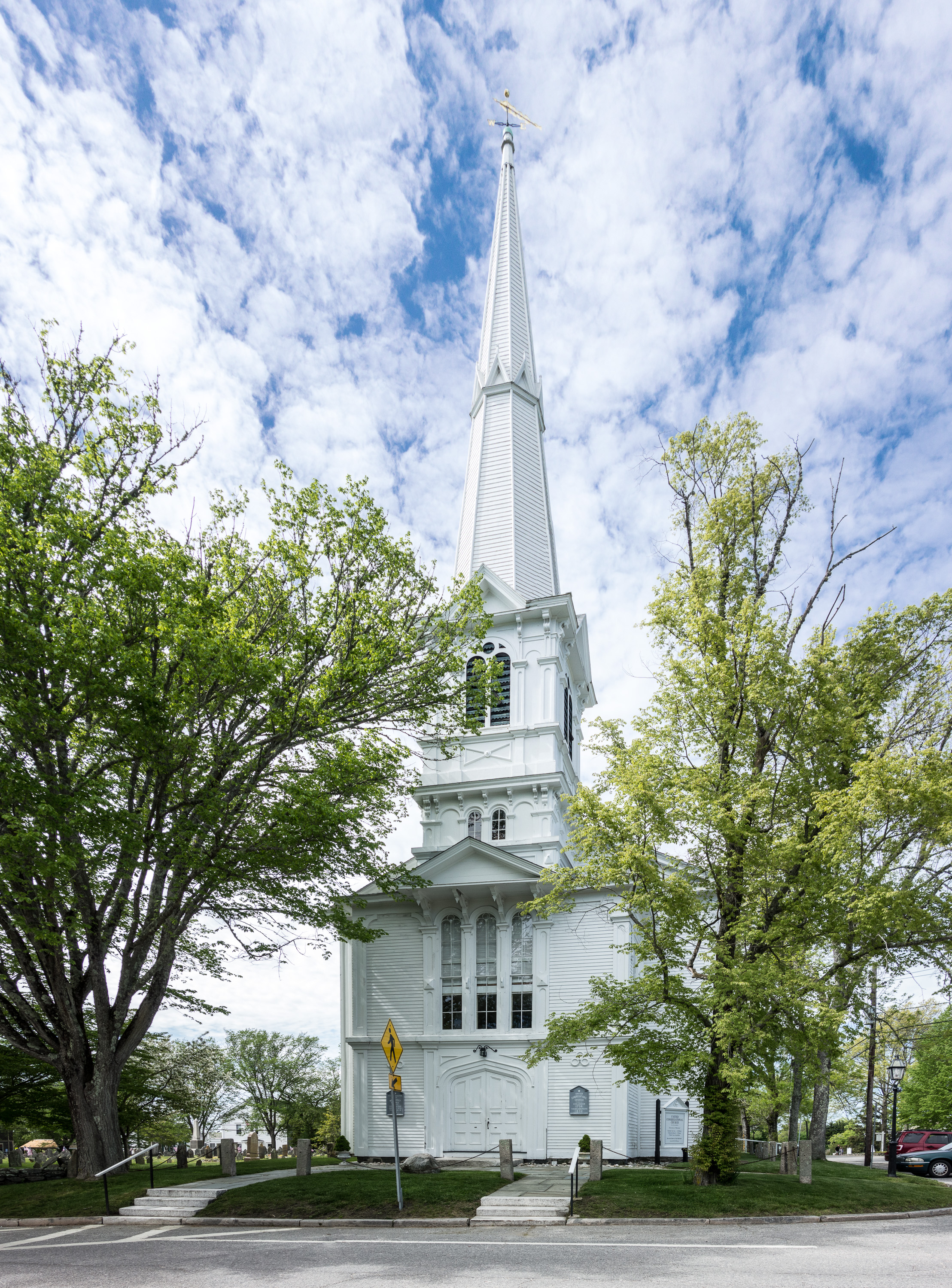
The United Congregational Church (built 1832)

The district features a variety of Greek Revival and Victorian buildings, including the United Congregational Church, whose tall steeple dominates the landscape; the First Methodist Meeting House; the Little Compton Town Hall and a former schoolhouse, now connected; Sakonnet Lodge, formerly a Methodist church; the Little Compton Community Center, formerly Grange Hall; the Brownell Library; a restaurant; and C. R. Wilbur's General Merchandise store; among others.

At the center of the district is the town common itself; one of only two remaining in Rhode Island. It contains a large colonial cemetery with many graves, including those of American Revolutionary War veterans and other notable individuals. Nearby is Union Cemetery – also part of the historic district – which features a Civil War Memorial.

The district was added to the National Register of Historic Places in 1974.

== Notable burials ==
- Benjamin Church, hero of King Philip's War, father of United States Army Rangers
- Elizabeth Pabodie, the first European woman born in New England, the daughter of Mayflower Pilgrims

== Gallery ==
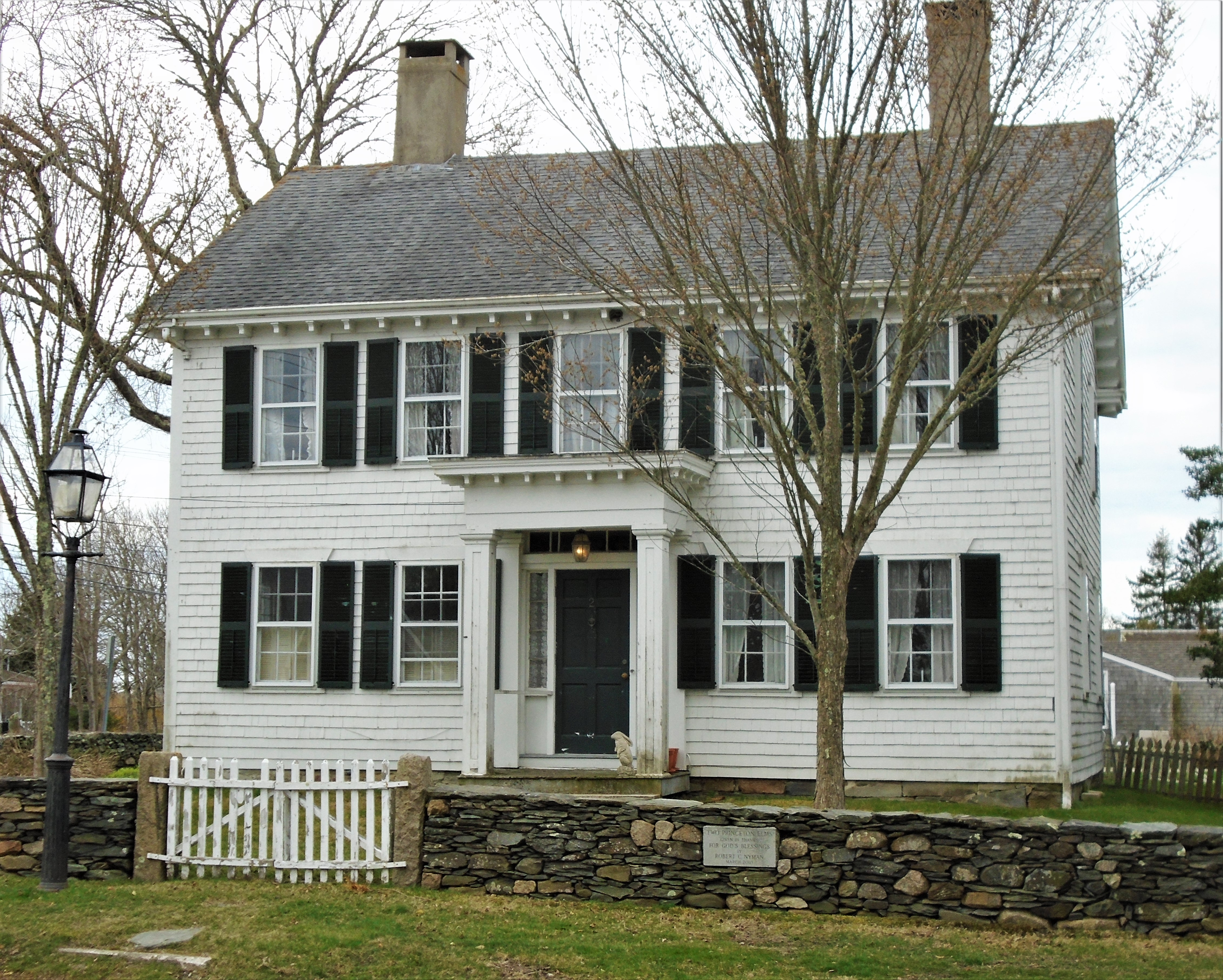
Parsonage of the Congregational Church, originally the First Methodist Meeting House (built in 1824 and moved in 1839)

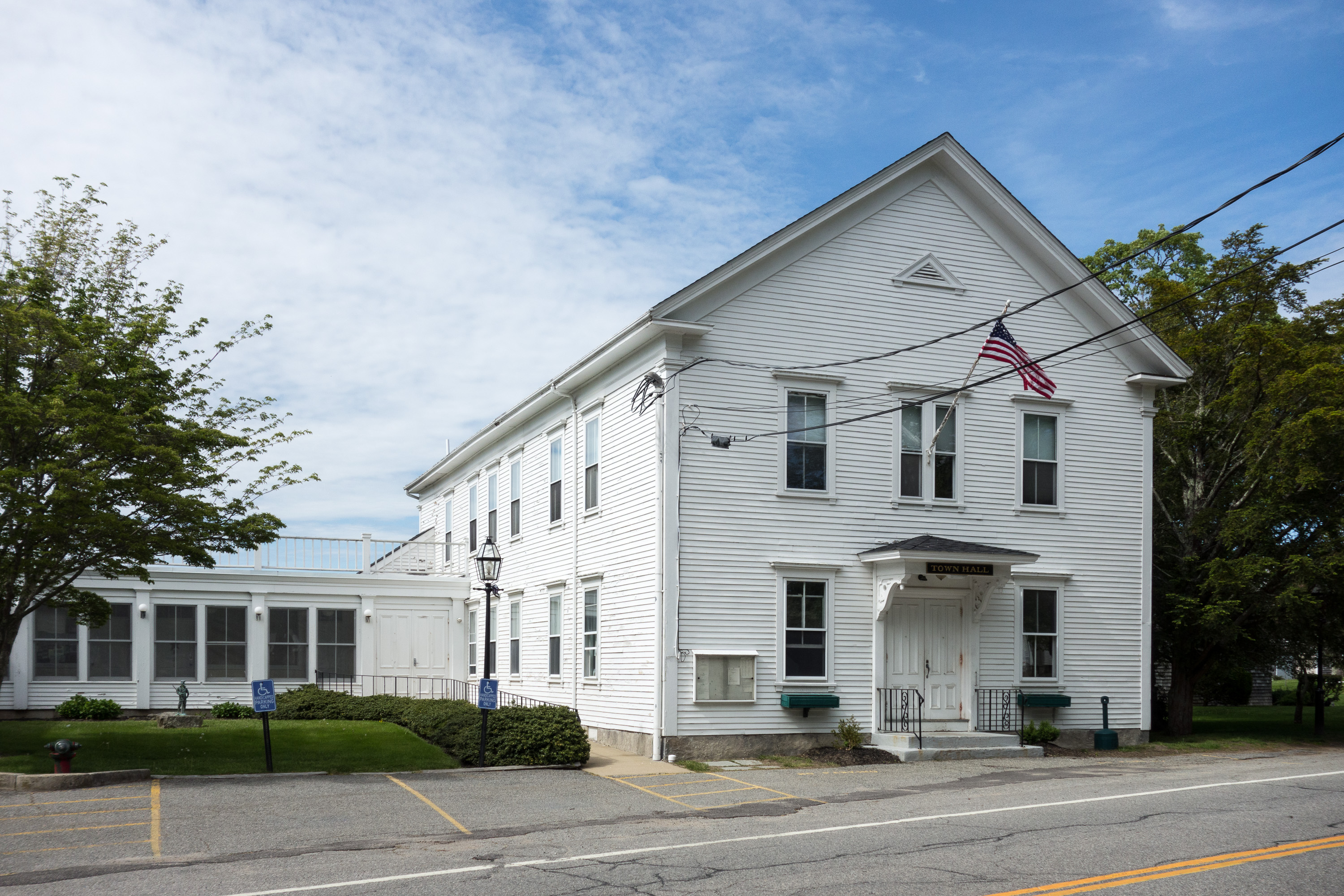
The Little Compton Town Hall (1880)

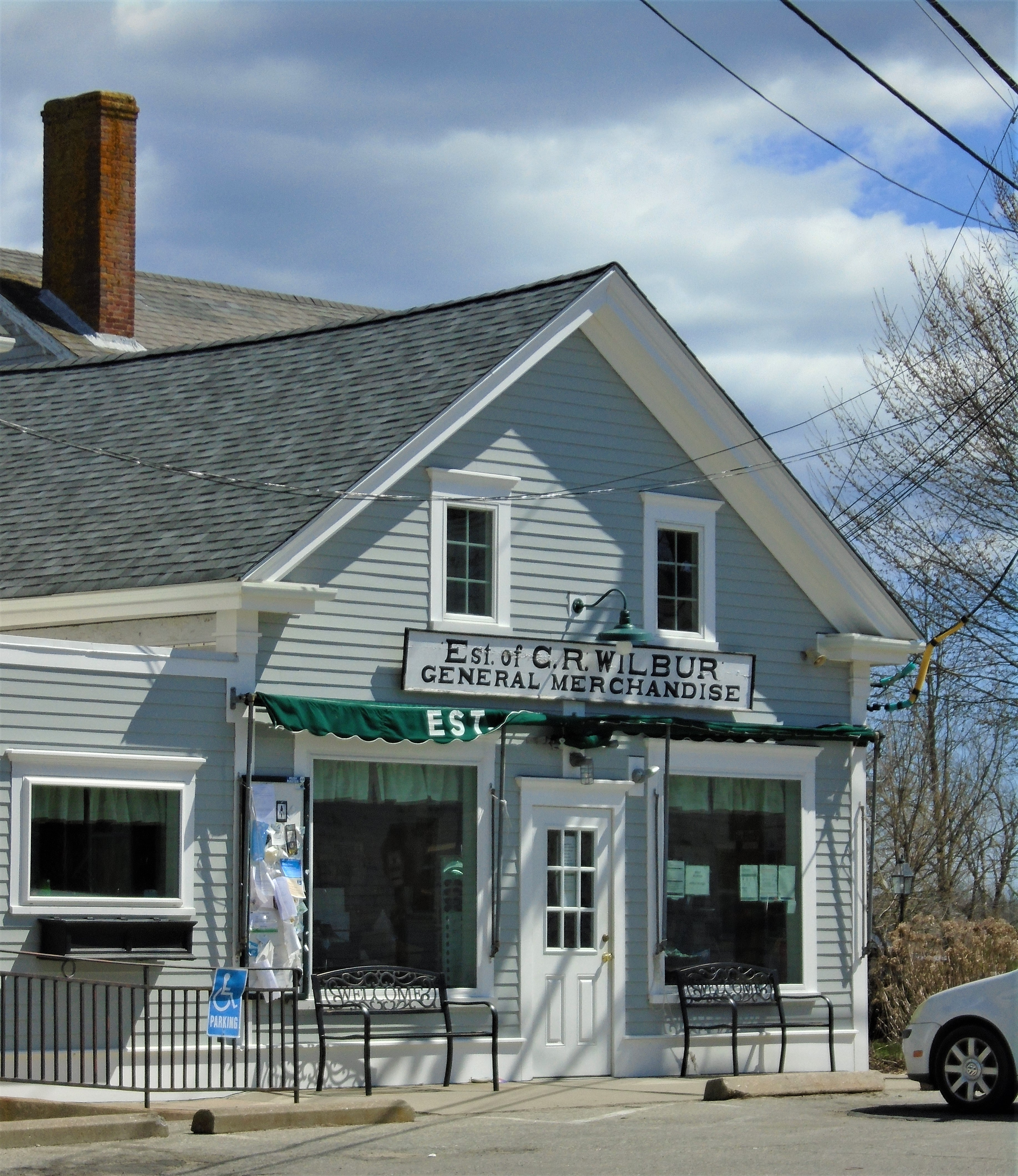
C. R. Wilbur's General Merchandise (built c. 1840)

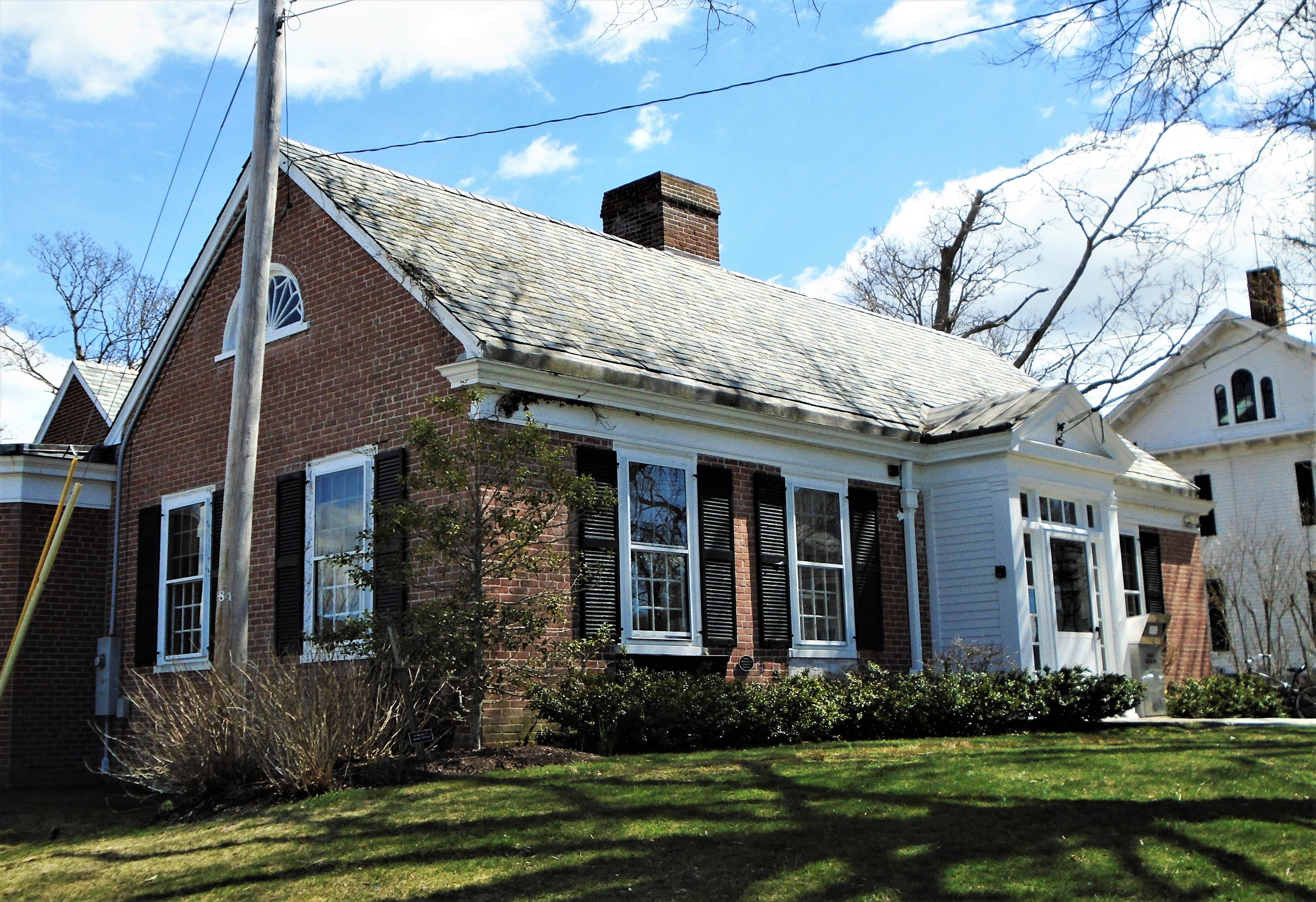
The Brownell Library (built 1929), home of the Little Compton Public Library

== See also ==
- National Register of Historic Places listings in Newport County, Rhode Island
