= Friends Meeting House and Cemetery =

Historic meetinghouse in Rhode Island, United States

- U.S. National Register of Historic Places
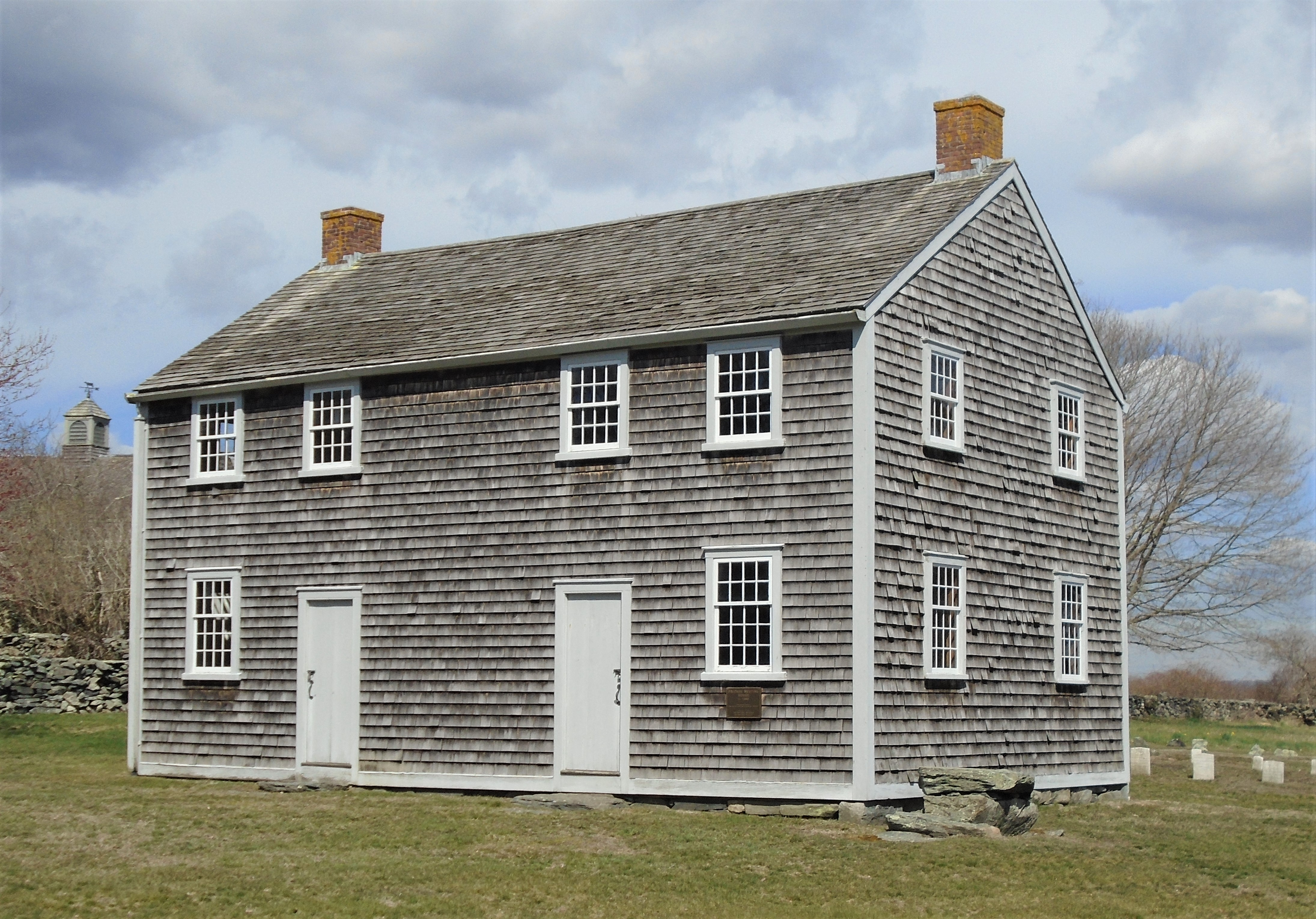
- (2021)

- Location within Rhode Island Location within the United States
- Location: 228A W. Main Rd., Little Compton, Rhode Island
- Coordinates: 41°31′33″N 71°11′38″W
- Area: less than one acre
- Built: 1815
- NRHP reference No.: 07000124
- Added to NRHP: March 06, 2007

The Friends Meeting House and Cemetery is a historic Quaker meeting house and cemetery at 228A W. Main Road in Little Compton, Rhode Island. The meeting house is a two-story wood-frame structure built in 1815 by the Religious Society of Friends, commonly known as Quakers, on the site of their first meeting house built in 1700 on land granted to John Irish. The new meeting house used some materials from the original one. It was then modified in 1870.

The meeting house was used by Quakers until 1903, and was maintained by members of the Apponegansett Meeting House in Dartmouth, Massachusetts until 1946, when it was donated to the Little Compton Historical Society. It was the Society's first acquisition, and was subjected to a careful restoration beginning in 1963 to restore it to the condition it was in during 1815.

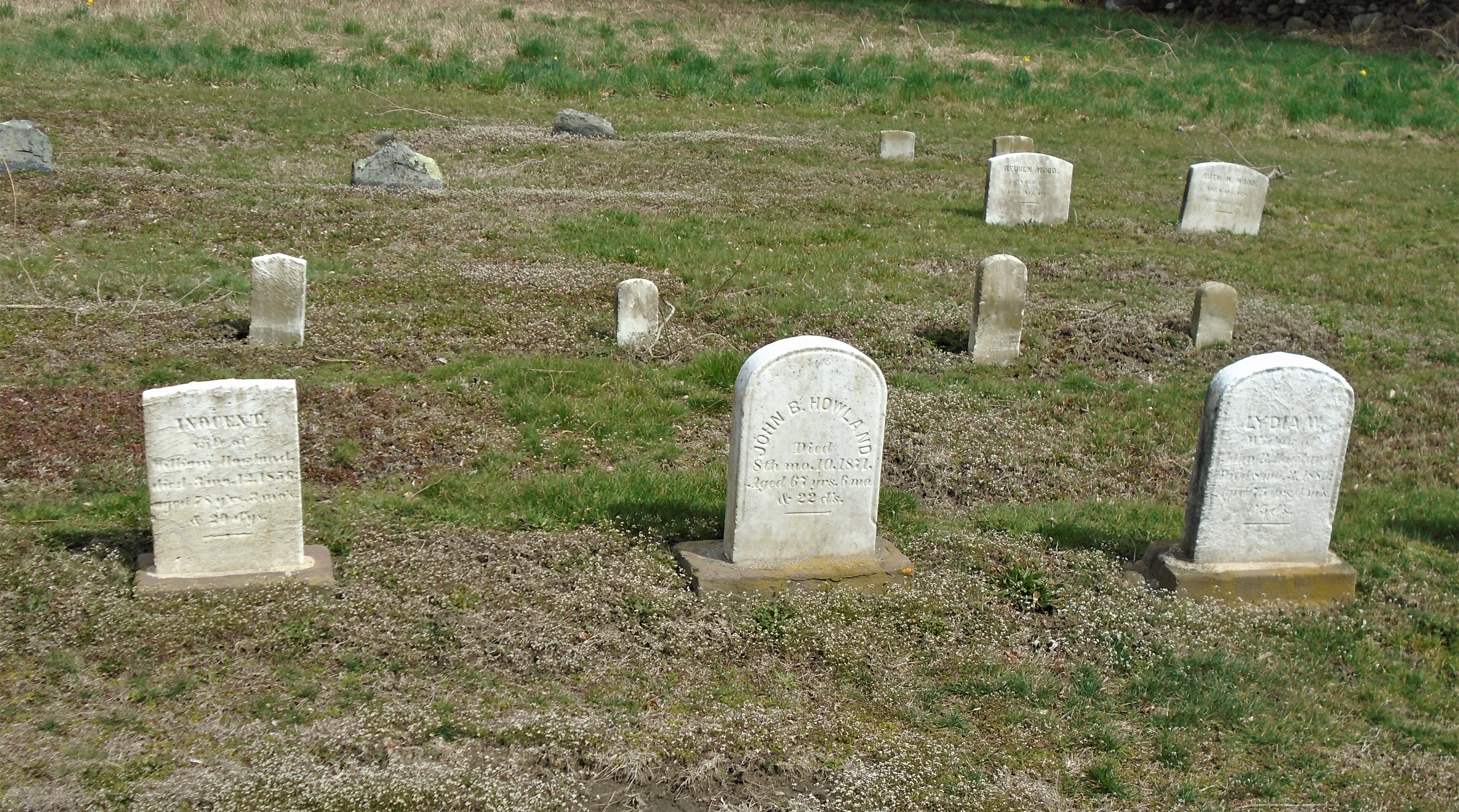
Gravestones in the cemetery

The cemetery, designated Rhode Island Historic Cemetery No. 7, is approximately a 71 foot by 41 foot (21.64m x 12.5m) rectangle located to the east (rear) of the meeting house. The earliest dated burials are from 1714 and 1729, and the latest is from 1903. There are 18 inscribed headstones in total, plus multiple uninscribed fieldstone and slate headstones.

The meeting house and cemetery were listed on the National Register of Historic Places in 2007.

== See also ==
- National Register of Historic Places listings in Newport County, Rhode Island
- Wilbor House, another property of the Little Compton Historical Society
