= William Whalley Homestead =

Historic house in Rhode Island, United States

- U.S. National Register of Historic Places
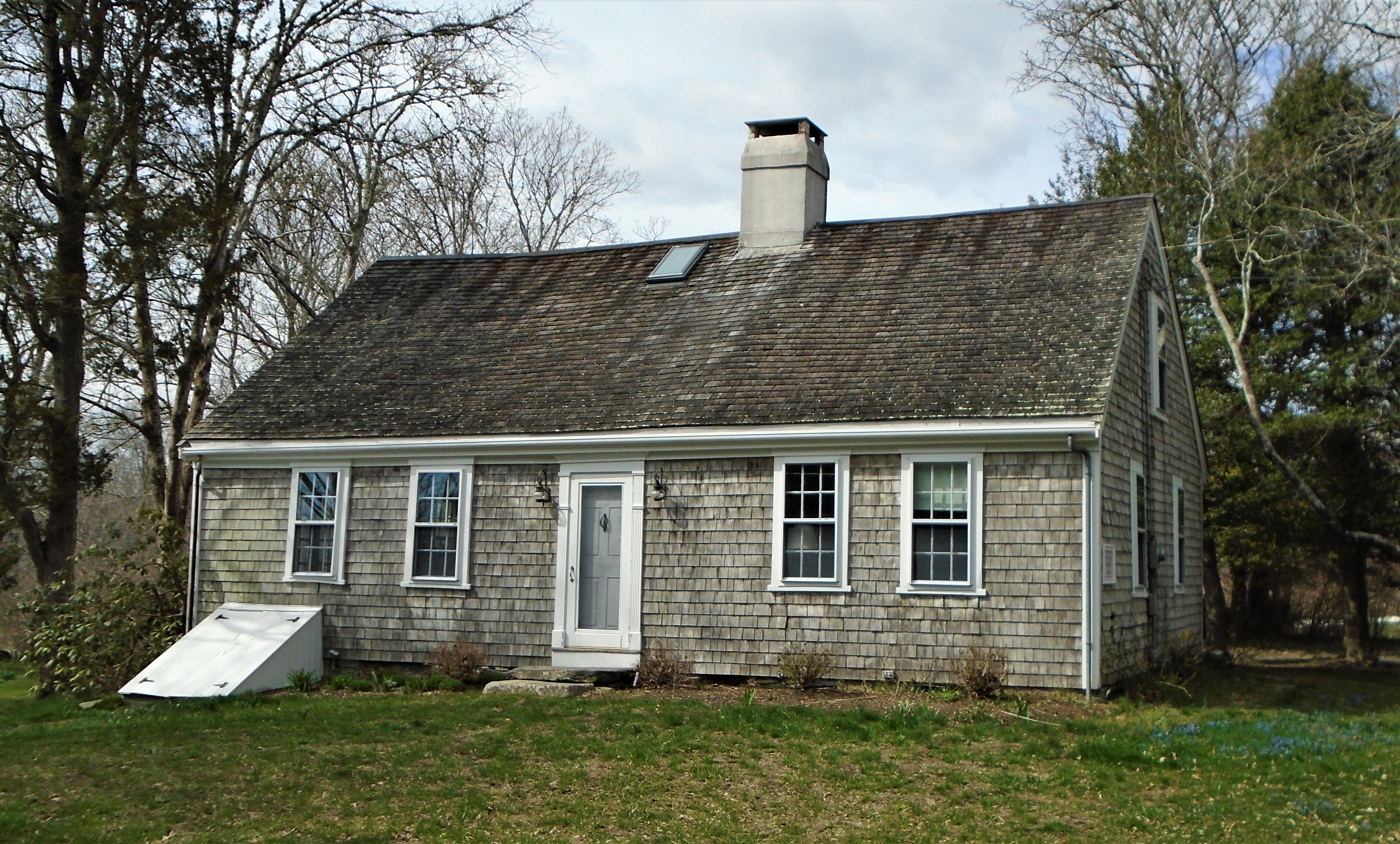
- (2021)

- Location within Rhode Island Location within the United States
- Location: 33 Burchard Avenue, Little Compton, Rhode Island
- Coordinates: 41°32′37″N 71°10′9″W
- Area: 2.1 acres (0.85 ha)
- Architectural style: Federal
- NRHP reference No.: 88001127
- Added to NRHP: August 3, 1988

The William Whalley Homestead is an historic farmstead in Little Compton, Rhode Island. The main house is a 1 1/2-story wood-frame structure, probably built sometime between 1815 and 1830. The property includes a late 19th century gabled barn and a stone and wood outbuilding, and is bounded by a low stone wall. The main house is a fairly typical Cape style house, five bays wide, with a central chimney. The property as a whole is a well-preserved example of a typical 19th-century farmstead in the area.

The homestead was listed on the National Historic Register in 1988.

== See also ==
- National Register of Historic Places listings in Newport County, Rhode Island
