= Little Compton, Rhode Island =

- Town
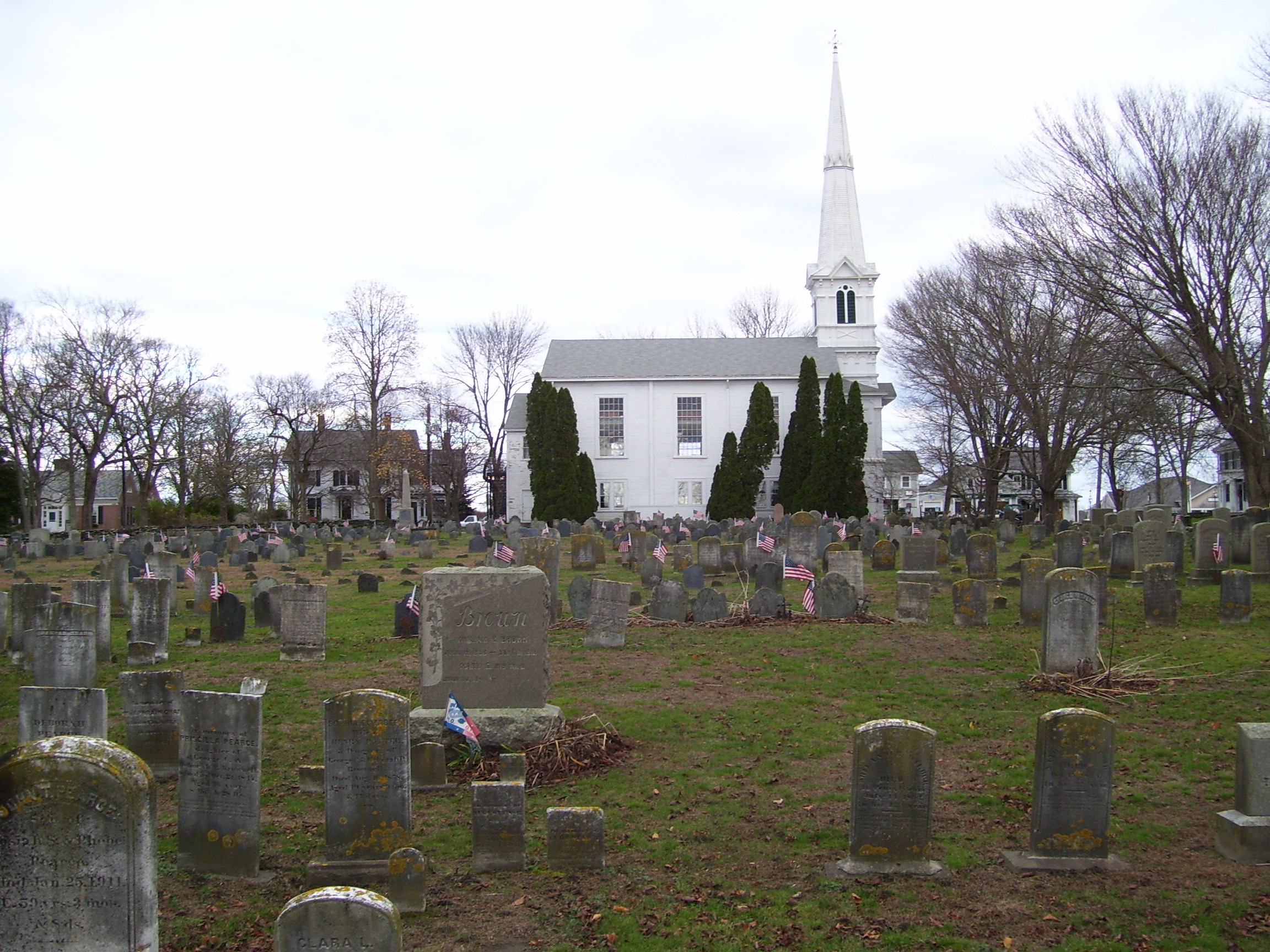
- Town Common and the United Congregational Church

- Coat of arms

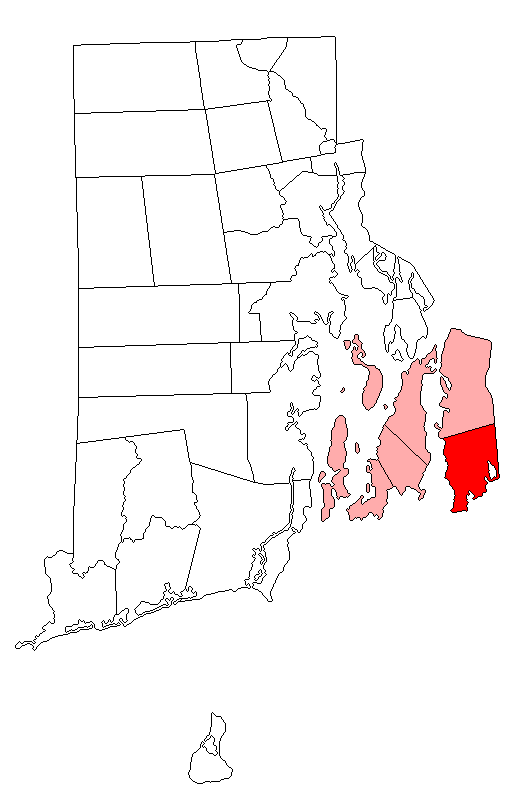
- Location of Little Compton in Newport County, Rhode Island
- Coordinates: 41°30′N 71°10′W
- Country: United States
- State: Rhode Island
- County: Newport
- Settled: 1675
- Incorporated: June 6, 1682
- Annexed by Rhode Island: January 27, 1747

Government
  - Type: Town Council-Town Administrator
  - Town Council President: Patrick A. McHugh (D); Gary S. Mataronas (R); Victoria G. Talbot (D); Paul J. Golembeske (R); Andrew W. Iriarte-Moore (D)
  - Town Clerk: Heather J. Cook (R)
  - Town Administrator: Anya Rader Wallack
  - Town Moderator: Lawrence G. Anderson

Area
  - Total: 28.9 sq mi (74.9 km^{2})
  - Land: 20.9 sq mi (54.1 km^{2})
  - Water: 8.0 sq mi (20.8 km^{2})
- Elevation: 85 ft (26 m)

Population (2020)
  - Total: 3,616
  - Density: 173/sq mi (66.8/km^{2})
- Time zone: UTC−5 (Eastern)
  - Summer (DST): UTC−4 (Eastern)
- ZIP Code: 02837
- Area code: 401
- FIPS code: 44-42400
- GNIS feature ID: 1220062
- Website: Town website

Little Compton is a coastal town in Newport County, Rhode Island, United States, bounded on the south by the Atlantic Ocean, on the west by the Sakonnet River, on the north by the town of Tiverton, and on the east by the town of Westport, Massachusetts. The population was 3,589 as of 2022 town records.

== History ==
Little Compton was originally inhabited by the Sakonnet Indians and their settlement was called Sakonnet or Saughonet. The name has been interpreted in a variety of ways including "where the water pours forth".

The first European settlers were from Duxbury, Massachusetts in the Plymouth Colony, which granted them their charter. The ruler of the Native Americans was a female sachem named Awashonks who resisted English colonization until forced by English forces to compromise, allowing some of her soldiers to join the English in exchange for a promise that the women and children not be sold into slavery during King Phillip's War. After the war, new settlers divided the land into standard-sized lots for farms, taking back land that had been promised to the Awashonks and her people. Among the 29 original proprietors was Colonel Benjamin Church, who would become well known for his role in the late 17th-century conflicts with surrounding Indian tribes, initially the Wampanoags and later, the Narragansetts. In 1675, Church built a house in Little Compton, just prior to King Philip's War. Today, a plaque marks the location on West Main Road.

In 1682, Sakonnet was incorporated by the Plymouth Colony and was renamed Little Compton, presumably in reference to Little Compton in Warwickshire, England. After the "Old Colony" was merged into the Massachusetts Bay Colony to the north, a local colonial representative to the General Court in Boston boasted that all the stone walls in Little Compton would stretch to the State House and back, if laid end to end. A Royal commission changed the state border in 1747, and Little Compton along with Tiverton and Bristol became part of Rhode Island, setting them off from the area of Old Dartmouth. All probate and land records prior to 1746 are kept in Taunton and New Bedford, Massachusetts. Beginning in the late Victorian era, the town became a destination for summer visitors drawn to its beaches and farms seemingly untouched by modernity, and for its relatively cool, maritime climate.

== Historic sites ==
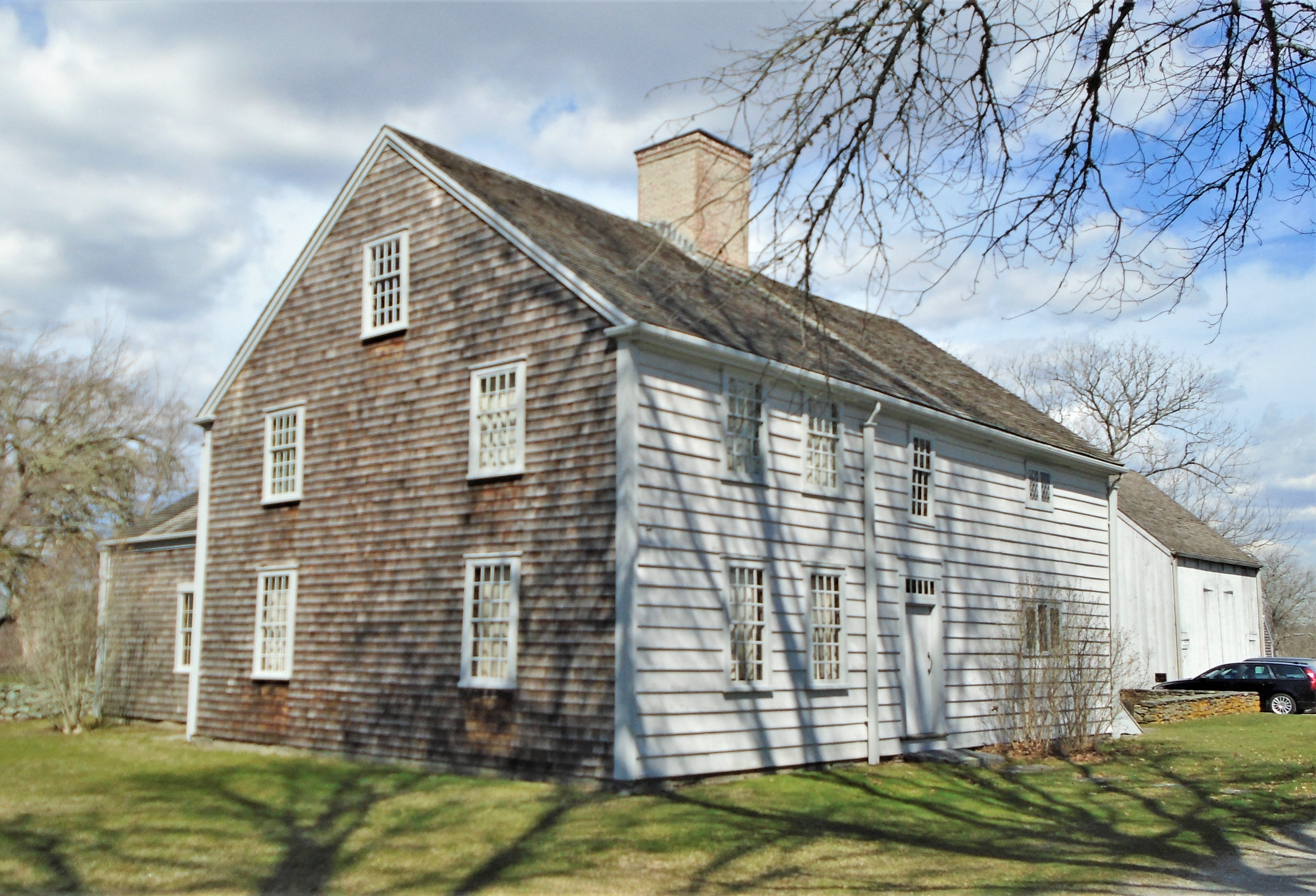
Wilbor House, built in 1692, is now the headquarters of the Little Compton Historical Society and a museum

Sites of historic interest in Little Compton include the Wilbor House, built in 1692 by Samuel Wilbore (1664–1740) (grandson of Samuel Wilbore), and now the home of the Little Compton Historical Society, the Friends Meeting House and Cemetery, and the William Whalley Homestead. There are about 57 historic cemeteries in the town.

Little Compton is home to one of only three town commons surviving in Rhode Island; the others are in Bristol and Warren. Land for the common was designated in August 1677 and has been used ever since as both a religious and civic center, the location of churches, a school, the town hall, town library, and other government buildings and civic institutions. The Common contains a large cemetery. Benjamin Church and his family are buried in the cemetery, as is Elizabeth Pabodie, the eldest daughter of John Alden and Priscilla Mullins of Mayflower fame. The stones in the cemetery reflect a style of carving similar to that found both in Newport and Boston during the same time period. The entire common is listed in the National Register of Historic Places as an historic district.

Another distinctive feature of the town is the c.1905 "Spite Tower" found in the hamlet of Adamsville. Built as a water tower, local lore claims that it was constructed to obscure the sight-lines of a rival abutting neighbor.

The Sakonnet Point Lighthouse is situated off the coast of Sakonnet Point in the southwest corner of Little Compton; the lighthouse was constructed in 1884 and was extensively restored in 2012.

The West Island Club was a prestigious sport fishing club that formerly occupied West Island, which is located roughly half a mile (0.8 km) south off the coast of Sakonnet Point. The exclusive club operated between 1864 and 1906, with notable members including the likes of Grover Cleveland, J.P. Morgan and Cornelius Vanderbilt. The remaining structures on the island were destroyed by the Hurricane of 1938, save for three stone support columns that are still extant.

Fort Church was built near Sakonnet Point during World War II and was named for Benjamin Church. The largest of the four batteries was Battery Gray with two 16-inch guns, an area that became the Sakonnet Golf Club.

== Demographics ==
Historical population
Census	Pop.	Note	%±
1790	1,542		—
1800	1,577		2.3%
1810	1,553		−1.5%
1820	1,580		1.7%
1830	1,378		−12.8%
1840	1,327		−3.7%
1850	1,462		10.2%
1860	1,304		−10.8%
1870	1,166		−10.6%
1880	1,202		3.1%
1890	1,128		−6.2%
1900	1,132		0.4%
1910	1,273		12.5%
1920	1,389		9.1%
1930	1,382		−0.5%
1940	1,492		8.0%
1950	1,556		4.3%
1960	1,702		9.4%
1970	2,385		40.1%
1980	3,085		29.4%
1990	3,339		8.2%
2000	3,593		7.6%
2010	3,492		−2.8%
2020	3,616		3.6%
U.S. Decennial Census

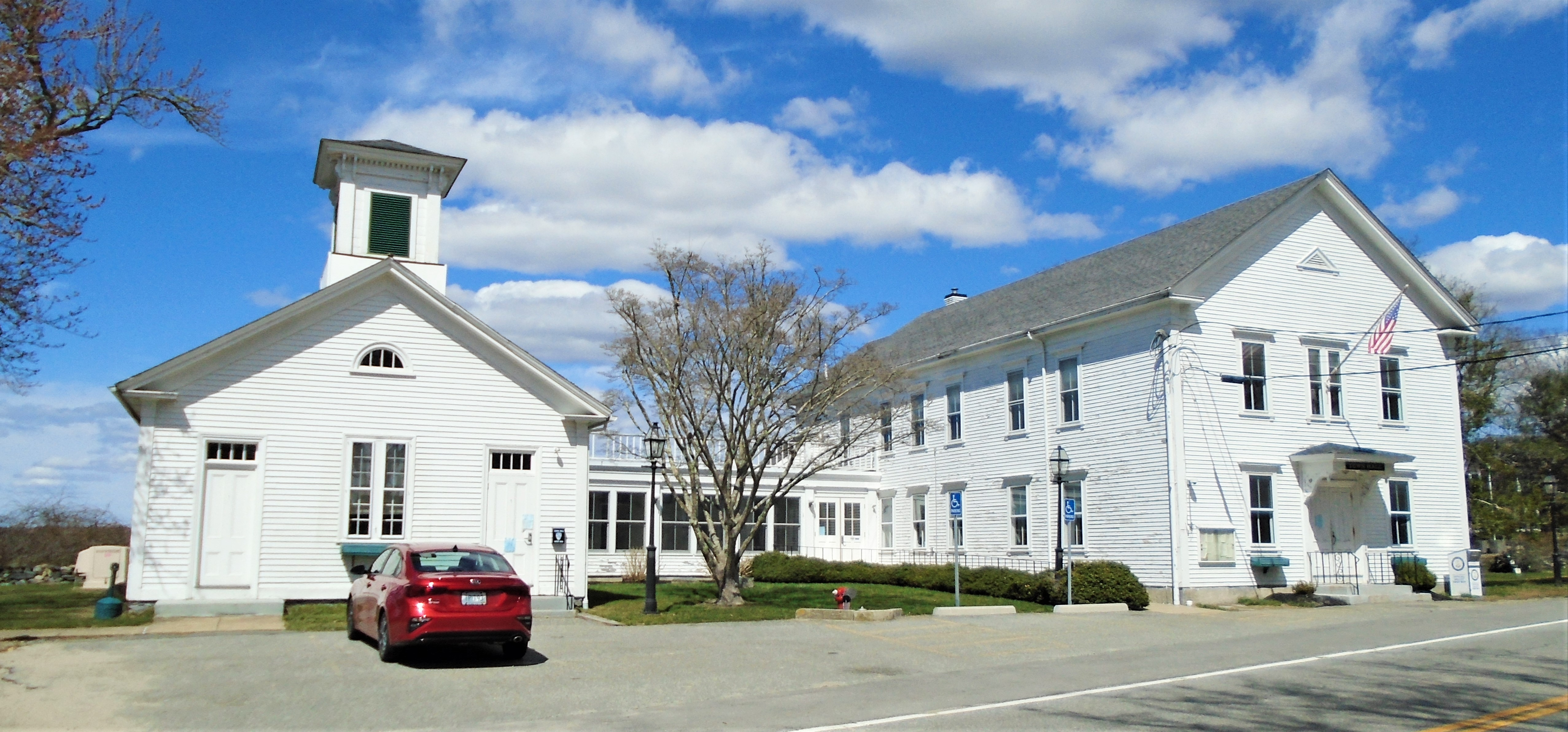
Town Hall (right) and the former schoolhouse which is now connected to it are part of the Little Compton Common Historic District

In 2022, there were 3,622 people in 1,578 households. Of the 2,444 housing units in Little Compton in 2021, only 62% were reported as occupied, leaving 928 units (38%) vacant for seasonal use only.

The population density of Little Compton was 175 people per square mile, which classifies as rural. In 2021, 98% of residents were White, 2% were Hispanic or Latino. More than half (59%) had earned a bachelor's degree or higher, which was 1.5 times greater than the rate of Rhode Island (34%). The median age in town was 58 years, considerably older than Rhode Island as a whole (40 years). The largest plurality of people (21% of the town) was between the ages of 60–69. And the largest plurality of residents moved to town in 2015 or later (28%). Only 2% of the town's population was under 10 years of age, far below the statewide average of 10%, and zero percent of women of childbearing age (ages 15–50) gave birth in 2021.

In 2022, the median value of owner occupied units was $797,000, more than double the value in Rhode Island as a whole ($319,000). A household needed an annual income of $174,000 to afford a median priced home in Little Compton, placing the town among the three most expensive zip codes in Rhode Island, ranking third most expensive behind only Block Island (New Shoreham) and Providence (East Side).

As of 2022, the median household income in Little Compton was $129,750, which was 1.5 times higher than Rhode Island ($86,372). The per capita income in Little Compton was $94,064, double that of Rhode Island ($45,919). Of Little Compton's households, 405 (or 25%) were classified as cost-burdened for having to spend more than 30% of their income on housing costs. About 3% of the population lived below the poverty line, which was one-fourth the rate of Rhode Island (12%).

Rhode Island State Law 45-5356 establishes a goal that 10 percent of every city or town's housing stock qualify as Low- and Moderate-Income Housing. In 2022, only 0.56% of Little Compton's housing stock qualified as meeting that goal, the lowest of any municipality in Rhode Island, leaving Little Compton as the most unaffordable town in Rhode Island and 235 units shy of the state target of 10 percent.

== Geography ==
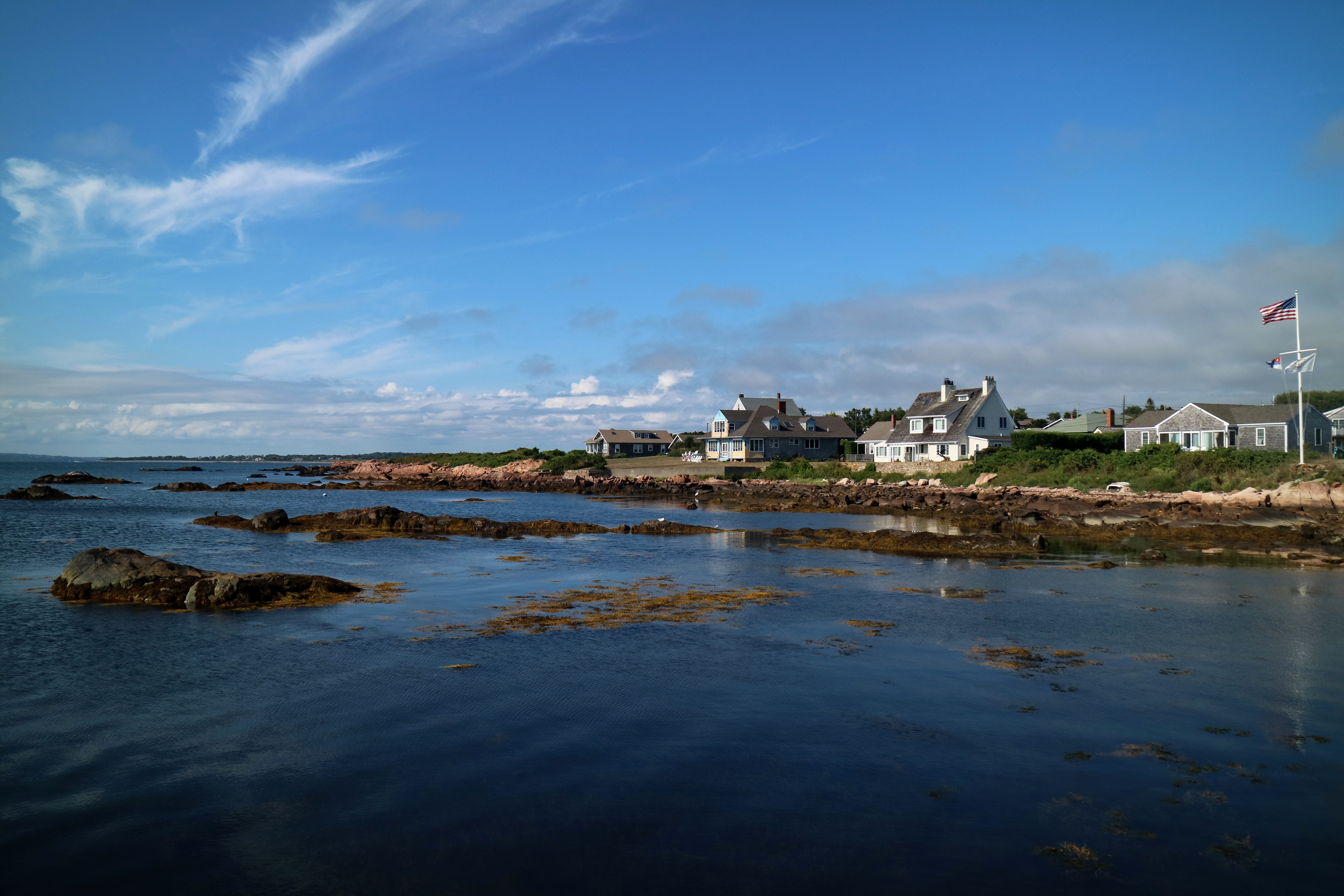
View of Sakonnet Harbor

According to the United States Census Bureau, the town has a total area of 28.9 square miles (75 km^{2}), of which, 20.9 square miles (54 km^{2}) is land and 8.0 square miles (21 km^{2}) (27.79%) is water. One of the largest bodies of fresh water in Little Compton is Quicksand Pond. Sakonnet Point is the town's southernmost point, offering views of the Sakonnet Point Lighthouse and several small rocky islands, including East Island and West Island. On a clear day, it is possible to view the inhabited islands of Martha's Vineyard, Cuttyhunk and Nashawena in Buzzards Bay, as well as Newport, Rhode Island to the west.

Along with its scenic coastline, another defining feature of Little Compton's landscape is its abundant stonewalls. According to Bruce Irving, author of the book New England Icons, "There were once some 250,000 miles of stone walls in the Northeast, enough to stretch to the moon, their epicenter generally sited in a fifty-mile radius around the meeting point of Rhode Island and Massachusetts, with the Rhode Island town of Little Compton especially rich in stone walls."

At times, Little Compton has been considered a part of the South Coast region of Massachusetts despite the town residing entirely within Rhode Island. By its most literal definition, the South Coast encompasses the geographic area of Massachusetts that borders Buzzards Bay (excluding the Elizabeth Islands, Bourne and Falmouth), Mount Hope Bay and the Sakonnet River. It has been argued that Little Compton and Tiverton share more in common with the regional identities of the South Coast communities of Westport and Dartmouth (and to an extent Fall River) than the rest of Newport County.

In recent years, Little Compton has also been included within a sub-region of the South Coast known as the Farm Coast which consists of several surrounding rural towns that are considered the last coastal farming communities left in Southern New England.

=== Localities ===
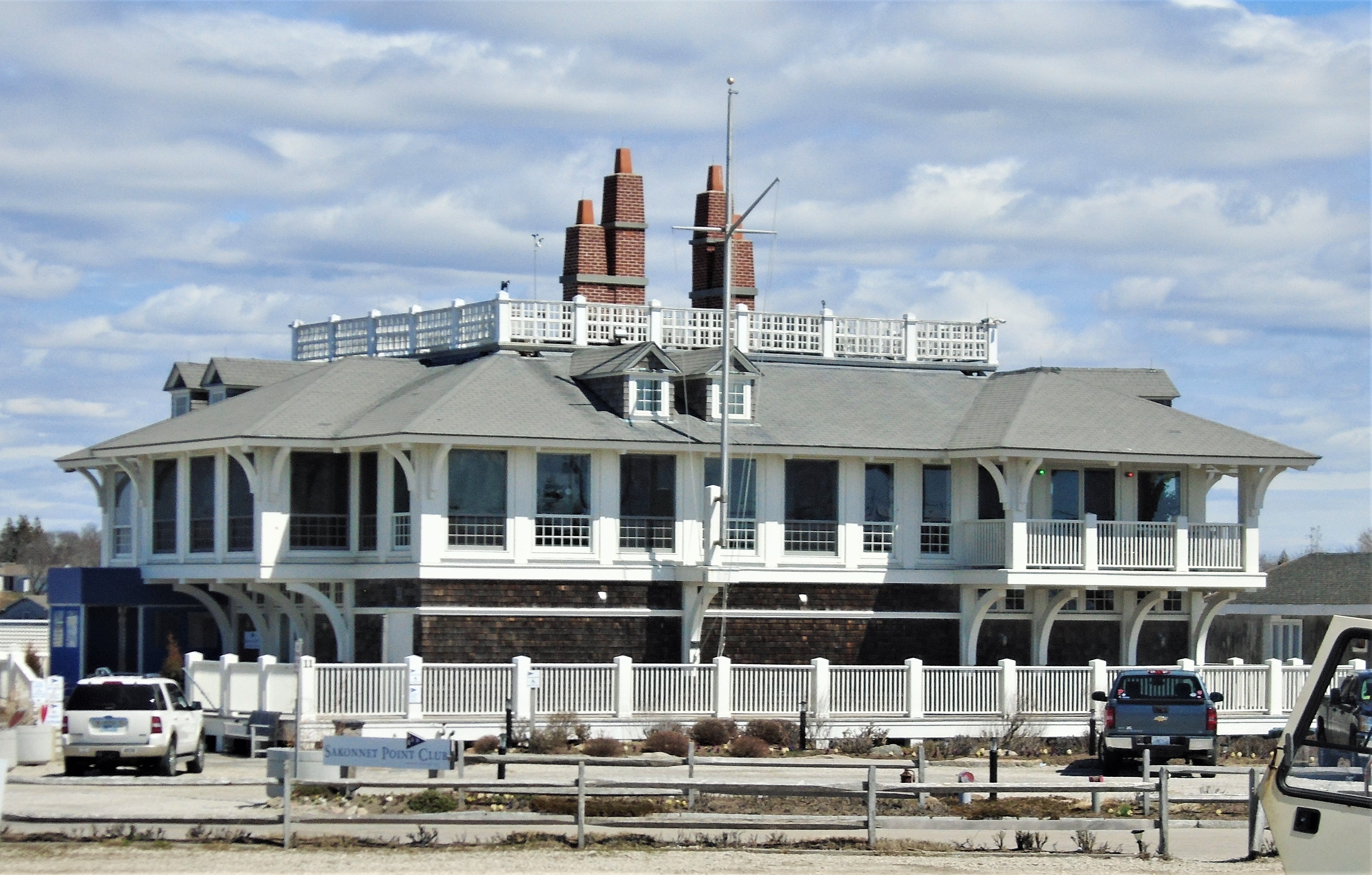
The Sakonnet Point Club is a member-only club located in the Sakonnet locale of Little Compton

There are several localities located in Little Compton, however, none are considered census-designated places: Adamsville, Pottersville, the Commons, Sakonnet, Warren Point and Chase Point. Adamsville is a village situated in the northeast corner of Little Compton and overlaps with the towns of Tiverton and Westport in Rhode Island and Massachusetts respectively. Adamsville is the only locality in Little Compton that has its own regional post office. Pottersville is a sparsely settled hamlet located south of Adamsville and is concentrated at the junction of Pottersville Road, John Dyer Road and Mullin Hill Road.

The Little Compton Commons encompasses the area that includes and surrounds the historic town common. The majority of Little Compton's civic buildings are located in the Commons, and the town hosts many events in this area. The Sakonnet neighborhood consists of the area located within and surrounding Sakonnet Point, which is situated at the mouth of the Sakonnet River. Several exclusive leisure clubs are located at Sakonnet Point - this includes the Sakonnet Golf Club, the Sakonnet Yacht Club and the Sakonnet Point Club.

Warren Point is located east of Sakonnet Point and is composed of residential waterfront properties; the exclusive Warren's Point Beach Club is located at Tappens Beach on Warren Point. Chase Point is located at the southeastern point of Little Compton and is composed of private roadways and residential properties which occupy former sheep pastures.

=== Beaches ===
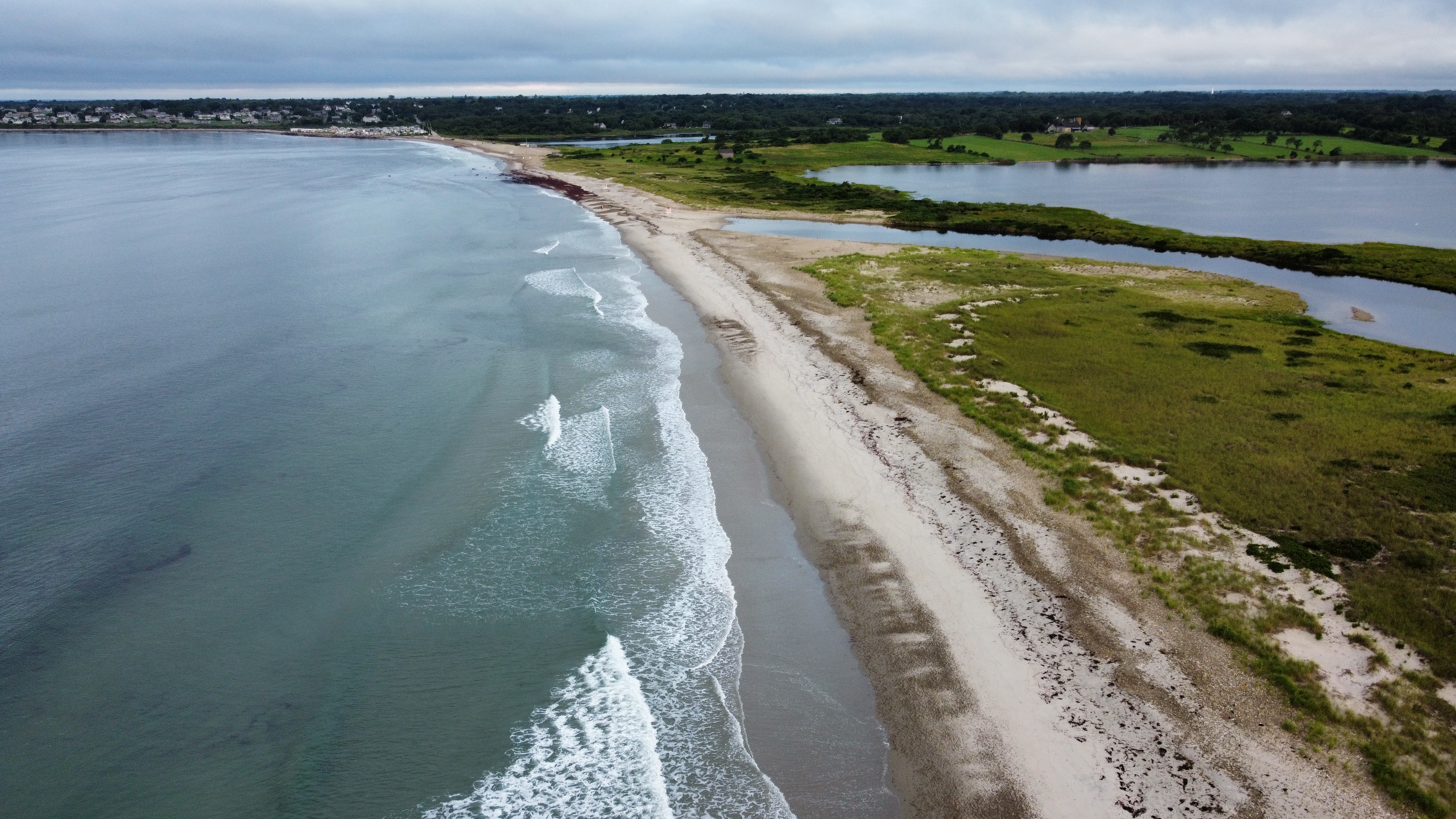
View of South Shore Beach, Goosewing Beach and Quicksand Pond

There are five beaches in Little Compton; however, only two are permitted for public use. South Shore Beach and Goosewing Beach, which are located adjacent to each other, are considered the only public beaches in Little Compton. South Shore Beach requires either a season pass, day pass, or proof of residency for parking access.

Briggs Beach and Tappens Beach are private beach clubs and are only permitted for members and their guests. Briggs Beach is located adjacent to Briggs Marsh and offers amenities such as changing rooms and parking. Tappens Beach is the shoreline property for the Warren's Point Beach Club which offers concessions, parking and changing rooms for members.

Lloyd's Beach, a gravel beach located near Sakonnet Point, is only accessible to residents of the surrounding Sakonnet neighborhood and requires proof of residency for entry.

== Agricultural Conservancy Trust ==
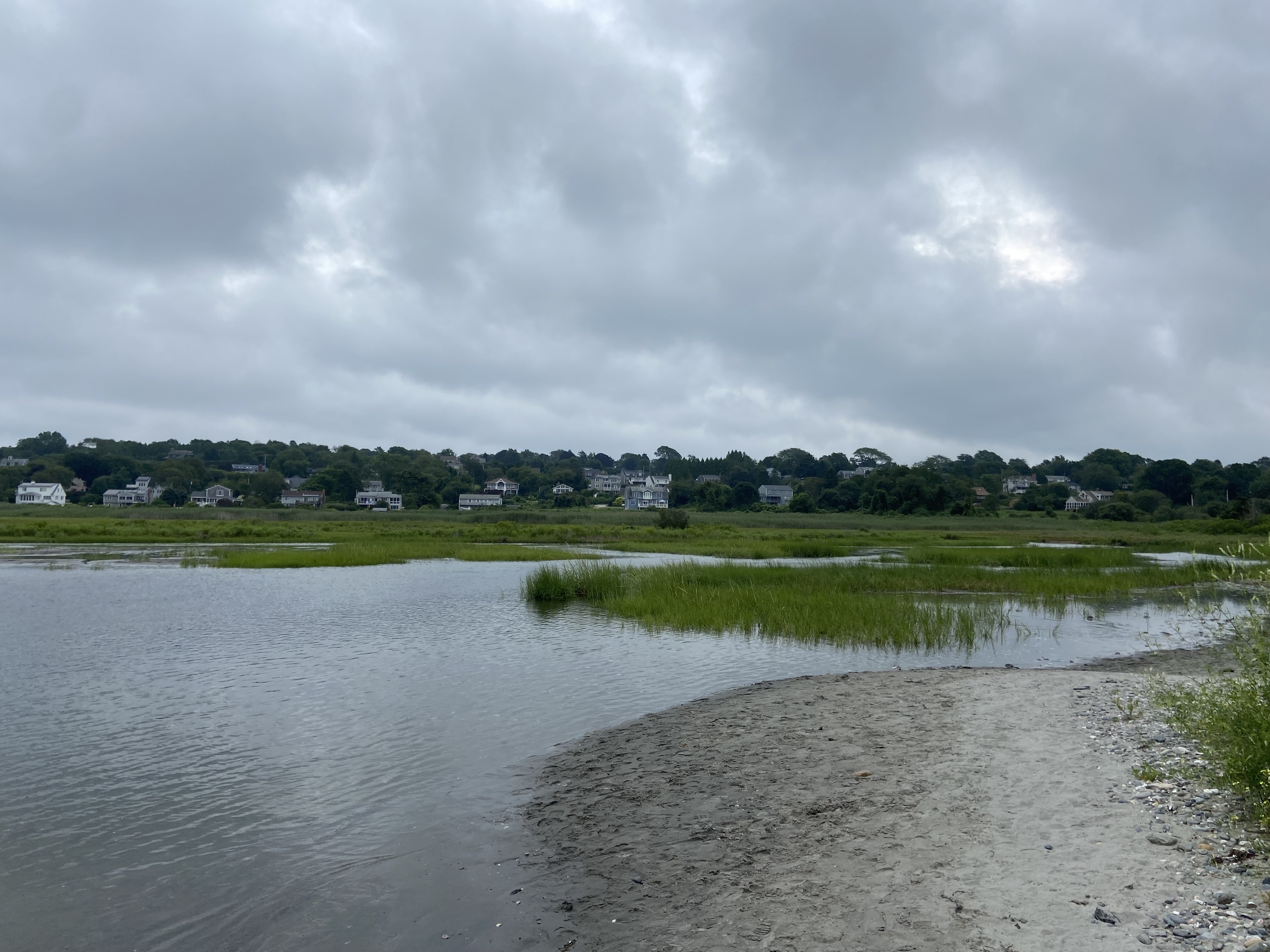
Almy Creek became Agricultural Conservancy Trust property in 2021

Little Compton is unique for its real estate transfer tax, which was enabled by state statute in 1985 to preserve farmland in town and protect limited drinking water resources from overdevelopment. Effective July 1, 2016, real estate property transfers are taxed at a 4% rate, with the first $300,000 is exempted, paid by the buyer in the transaction to the town's Agricultural Conservancy Trust. As of 2021, the Ag Trust has preserved 2,162 acres of land, more than 671 acres of that owned outright by the Ag Trust, with 133 acres of that leased to local farmers.

Easements are emplaced on Agricultural Conservancy Trust property which allows public access on preserved land in the form of maintained public rights-of-way; this is a unique practice that is not often seen in the United States and is more commonly associated with English Law.

== Education ==
There is one school in Little Compton, the Wilbur and McMahon School on School House Lane near the Common, originally known as the Josephine Wilbur (or Central) School; residents simply refer to it as "Wilbur School." It had 12 classrooms and housed the town's K–12 facilities. It was renamed after additions were built in the mid 1900s. Approximately 208 students attend classes in Kindergarten through 8th grade. High school students usually attend Portsmouth High School in Portsmouth, Rhode Island, about a 25 minute drive away, as well as other options like Bishop Stang High School in Dartmouth, Massachusetts. The school has 2 floors; one for Elementary and the second floor for 4-8. The biggest room in the Wilbur McMahon School is the Gymnasium or historically, "Mr Mac's Gym." Followed by the Art Room until further renovations were made in Late 2023 to construct a conjoined Spanish and Design room. The school also implements the International Baccalaureate or, (IB) Program. Wilbur School is the only Middle School in Rhode Island to host this program.

== Library ==
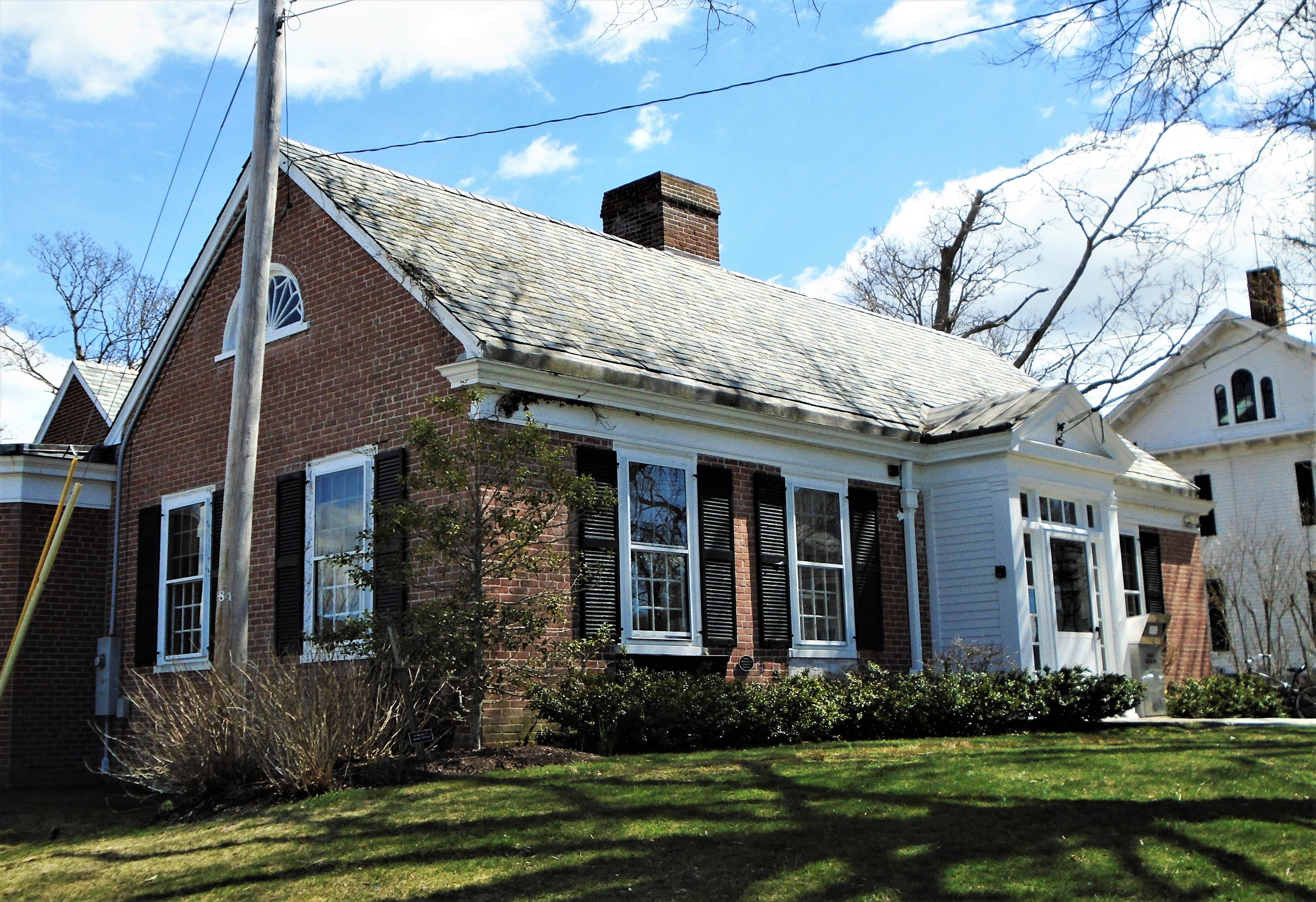
The Brownell Library is located within the Little Compton Commons

The Little Compton Public Library was first founded 1879 and was formerly located within the Little Compton Town Hall. The Brownell Library was a separate library constructed in 1929 and was designed by Charles Loring in the Georgian Revival style. The Little Compton Public Library moved out of the Town Hall and consolidated with the Brownell library in 1963. The Brownell Library currently serves as Little Compton's only public library. In addition to book borrowing, the library offers programs, events, information resources, and other materials for library members.

== Rhode Island Red ==
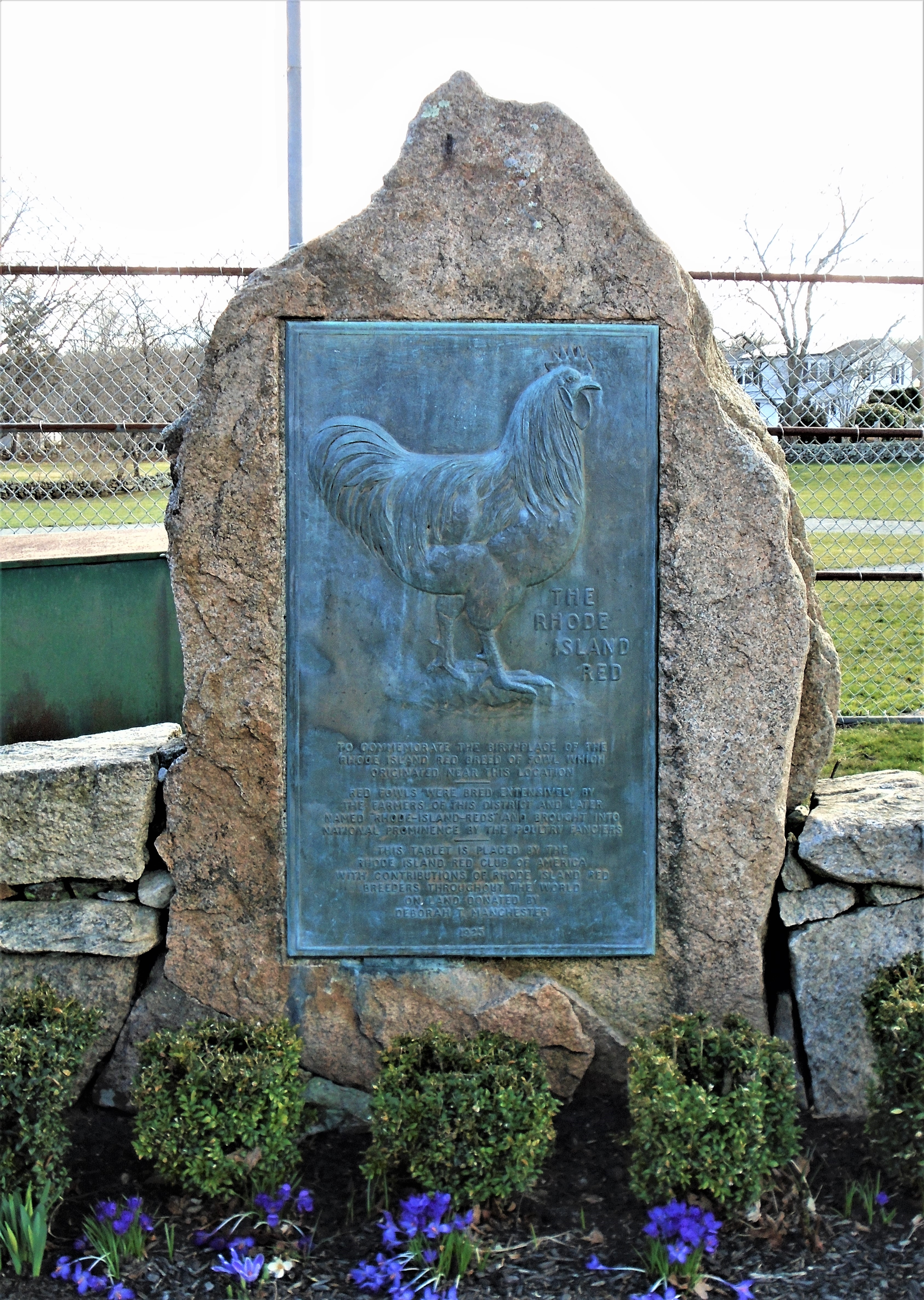
The Rhode Island Red Monument

The Rhode Island Red is a native breed of poultry first bred by William Tripp in Adamsville. According to The Livestock Conservancy, "The Rhode Island Red is not only America's best known breed, but is perhaps the world's best known fowl. It is the most successful dual purpose bird [raised for both eggs and meat], and remains an excellent farm chicken [or non-industrial breed]." In 1925, the Rhode Island Red Club of America donated funds for a monument to the Rhode Island Red in Adamsville, at the intersection of Main Street and Westport River Road. Another plaque honoring the Rhode Island Red was erected by the state on the breed's 100th anniversary in 1954, 1-mile (1.6 km) south of Adamsville on the wall of what was William Tripp's farm. The two memorials reflect a dispute between poultry fanciers and farmers over who should have received credit for the breed's success.

== Transportation ==
Little Compton is one of four towns in Rhode Island that is not served by RIPTA bus service. Route 77 runs 14 miles (23 km) from Rhode Island Road in southern Little Compton to Route 24 in Tiverton. Route 81 runs from Route 179 in southern Little Compton and continues as Massachusetts Route 81 near Fall River.

Historically, railroads and streetcar lines were never constructed in Little Compton. Overland transportation in Little Compton has always been limited to roads. The closest passenger rail station is Fall River Depot, located on the MBTA's Fall River/New Bedford Line.

== Notable people ==
- Awashonks (c. 1620–c. 1684), female sachem (chief) of the Sakonnet tribe
- Evangeline Wilbour Blashfield (1858–1918), writer
- Jack Brennan (1937–2023), president Richard Nixon's post-resignation chief of staff; had a summer home in Little Compton
- Sydney Richmond Burleigh (1853–1931), painter and illustrator; building and furniture designer; born in Little Compton
- J. C. Chandor (born 1974), writer, director, and Academy Award nominee for the screenplay of Margin Call; summer resident of Little Compton
- Colonel Benjamin Church (c. 1639–1718), founder of Little Compton. Known as the father of the United States Army Rangers and commander of Colonial forces during King Philip's War (1675–1676); died and is buried in Little Compton
- Isaiah Davenport (1784–1827), master builder
- Sylvester Graham, pastor, early vegetarian, namesake of the Graham Cracker
- Christopher R. Hill (born 1952), former Assistant Secretary of State for East Asian and Pacific Affairs and former United States Ambassador to Iraq; lived in Little Compton
- Henry Demarest Lloyd (1847–1903), political activist and muckraking journalist; lived in Little Compton
- J. William Middendorf (1924–2025), United States Ambassador to the Netherlands, Permanent Representative to the Organization of American States, Secretary of the Navy, composer, and artist; lives in Little Compton
- Arden Myrin (born 1973), comedian and actress (MADtv, Chelsea Lately); born in Little Compton
- Elizabeth Pabodie (1623–1717), daughter of Plymouth Colony settlers John Alden and Priscilla Mullins, recognized as the first white girl born in New England; buried in Little Compton
- Abel Head "Shanghai" Pierce (1834–1900), a Texas rancher and cattleman; known as an authority on cattle; born in Little Compton
- Jacob Frank Schulman (1927–2006), Unitarian Universalist minister, theologian, and author of several books. Summer resident with wife Alice Southworth Schulman, descendant of John Alden, Priscilla Mullins and Constant Southworth, one of the original 16th century settlers
- Charles Upham Shepard (1804–1886), mineralogist; born in Little Compton
- John Simmons (1796–1870), clothing manufacturer; founder of Simmons College; born in Little Compton
- Henry Tillinghast Sisson (1831–1910), American Civil War era colonel in the Union Army; Lieutenant Governor of Rhode Island; inventor of the three-ring binder; lived and died in Little Compton
- Paul Suttell (born 1949), current Chief Justice of the Rhode Island Supreme Court; lives in Little Compton
- John Cunningham Whitehead (1922-2015), former chairman of Goldman Sachs; Deputy Secretary of State, 1985–89; former chairman of the New York Federal Reserve Bank; chairman of post-9/11 Lower Manhattan Development Corporation; summer resident of Little Compton.
- Rupert von Trapp (1911–1992), eldest son of the Trapp Family Singers, whose family story inspired The Sound of Music; lived in Little Compton
- Charles Edwin Wilbour (1833–1896), journalist and Egyptologist who produced the first English translation of Les Misérables; born in Little Compton
- Isaac Wilbour (1763–1837), 6th governor of Rhode Island; US congressman; 34th chief justice of the Rhode Island Supreme Court; born and died in Little Compton

== Attractions and sites on National Register of Historic Places ==
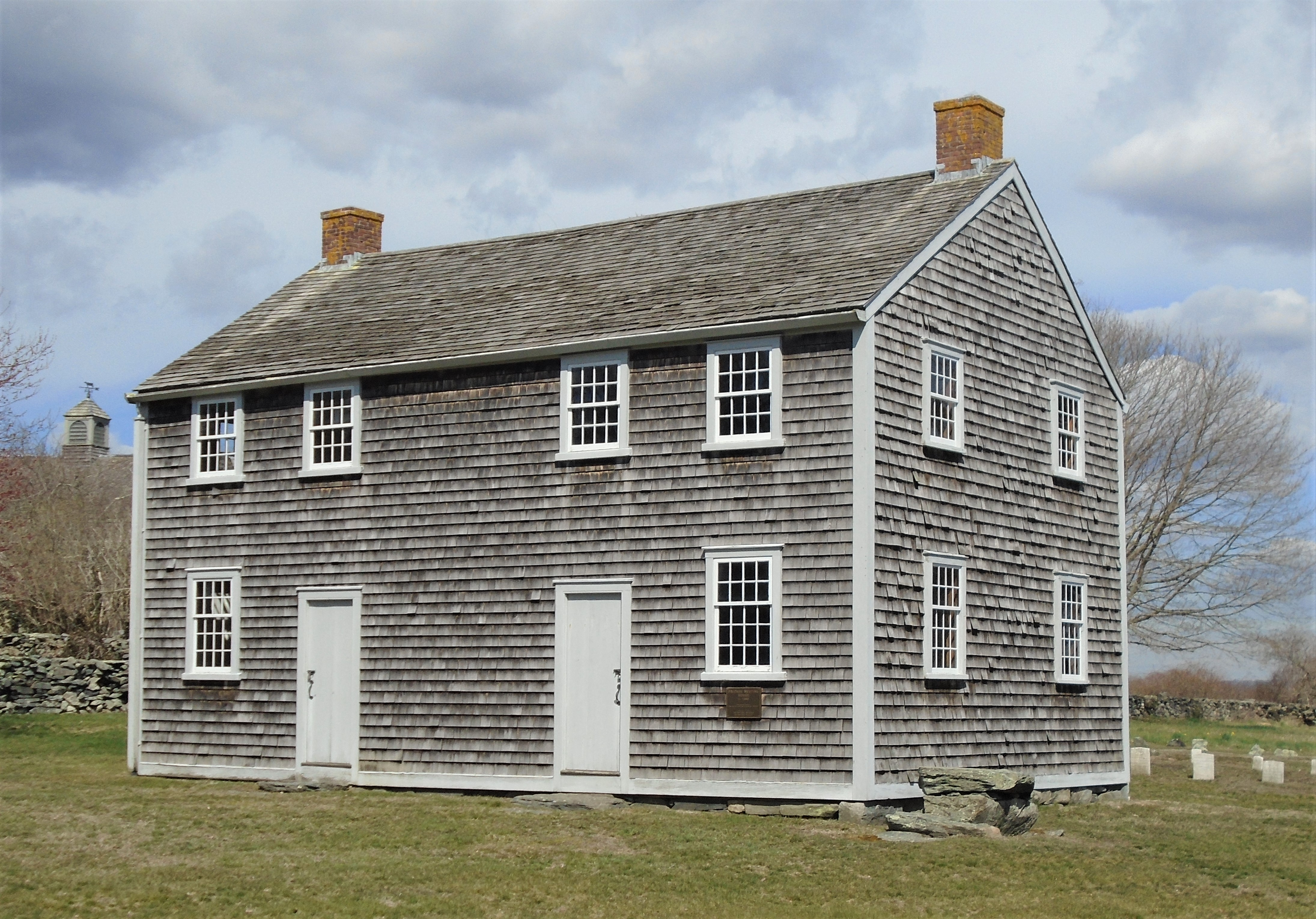
Friends Meeting House and Cemetery, built in 1815

- Friends Meeting House and Cemetery (1815)
- Little Compton Common Historic District, including the United Congregational Church and the Town Hall, among other buildings
- Rhode Island Red Monument (1925)
- Sakonnet Light Station (1884)
- Stone House Inn (1854)
- Wilbor House Museum (1692)
- William Whalley Homestead

== Gallery ==
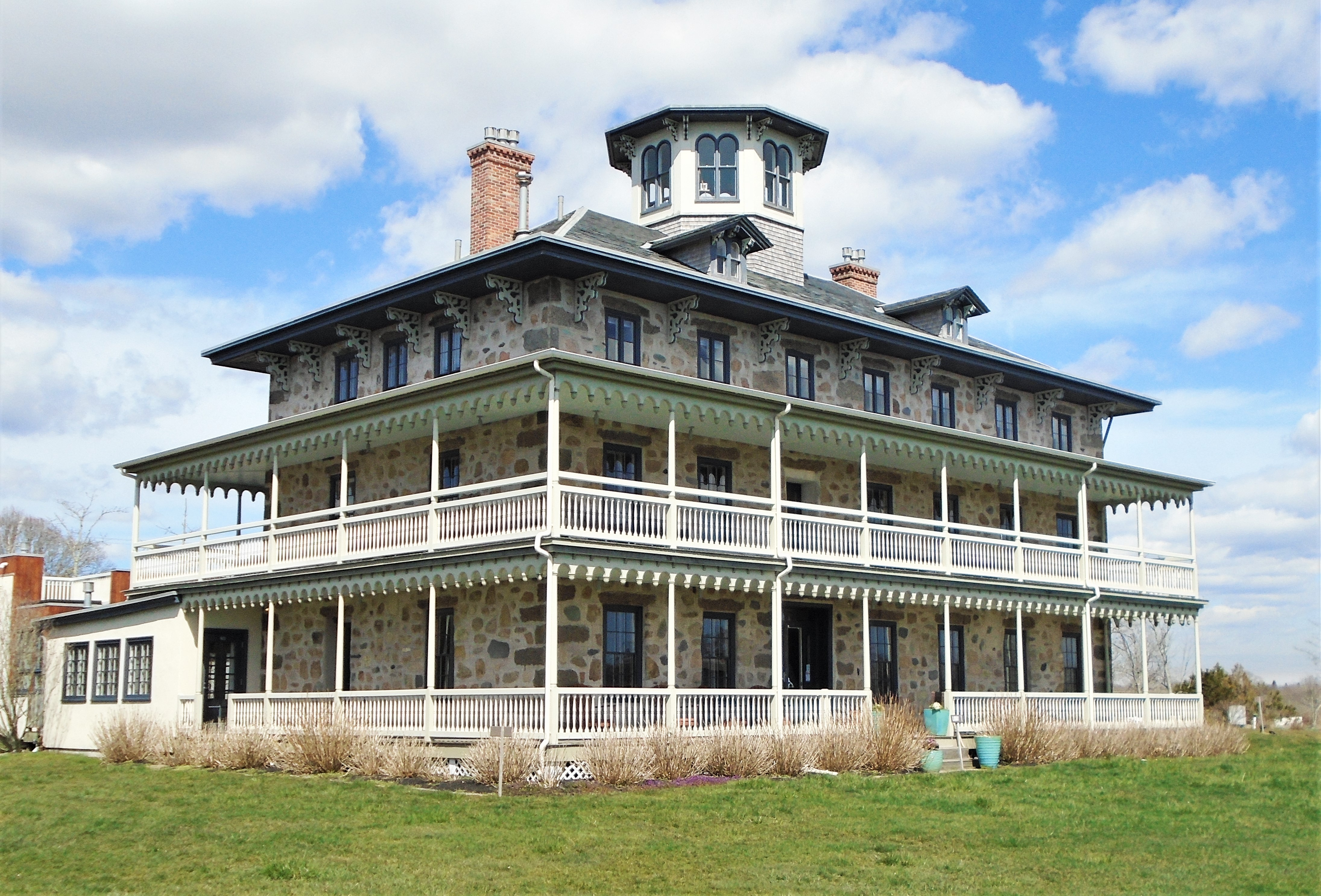
The Stone House Inn was built in 1854 as a home for industrialist David Sisson. At the time of completion, it was the biggest residence in the area.

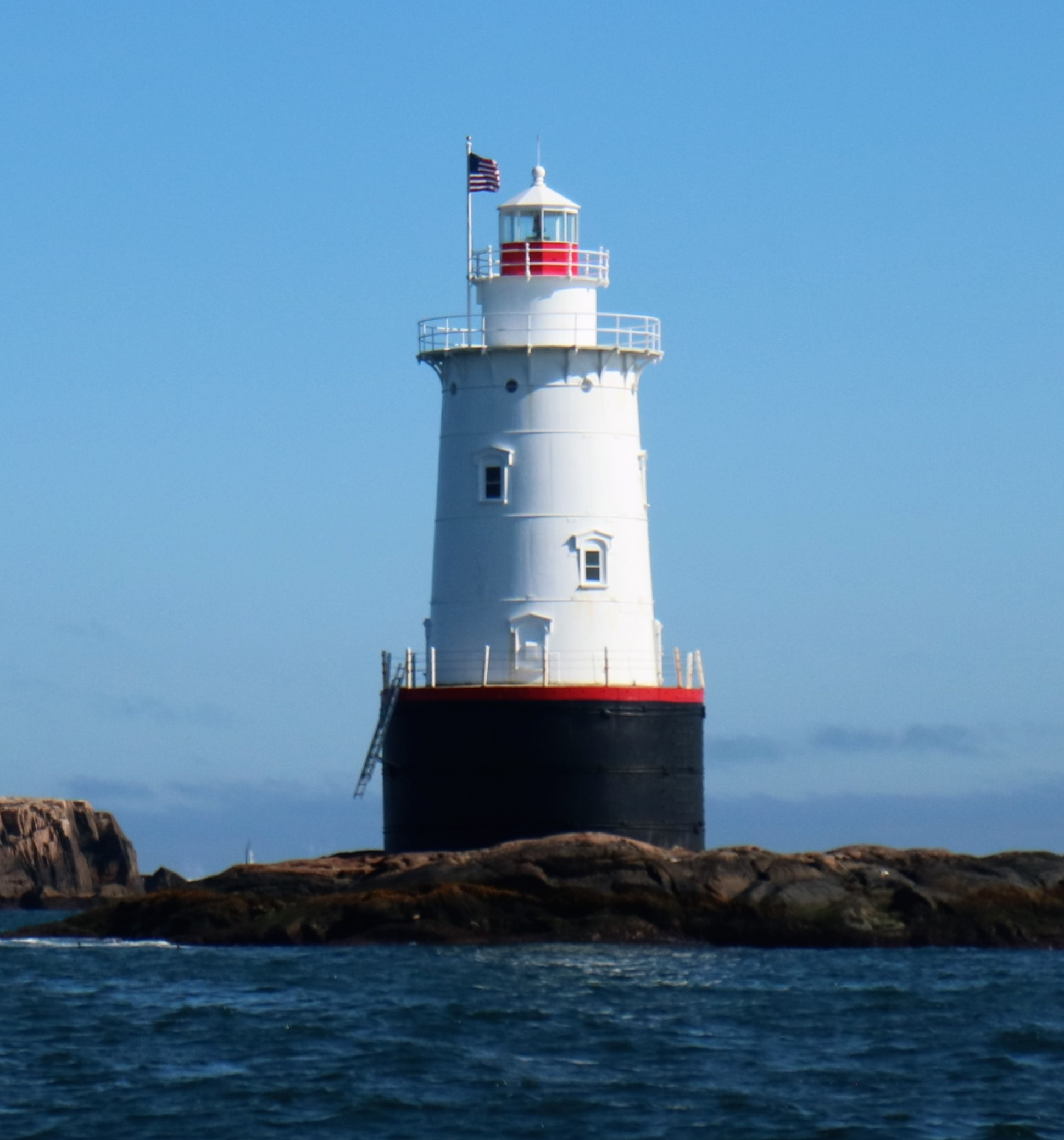
The Sakonnet Light Station was built in 1885 and renovated in 2012. It sits on a rock in the Sakonnet River off of Sakonnet Point

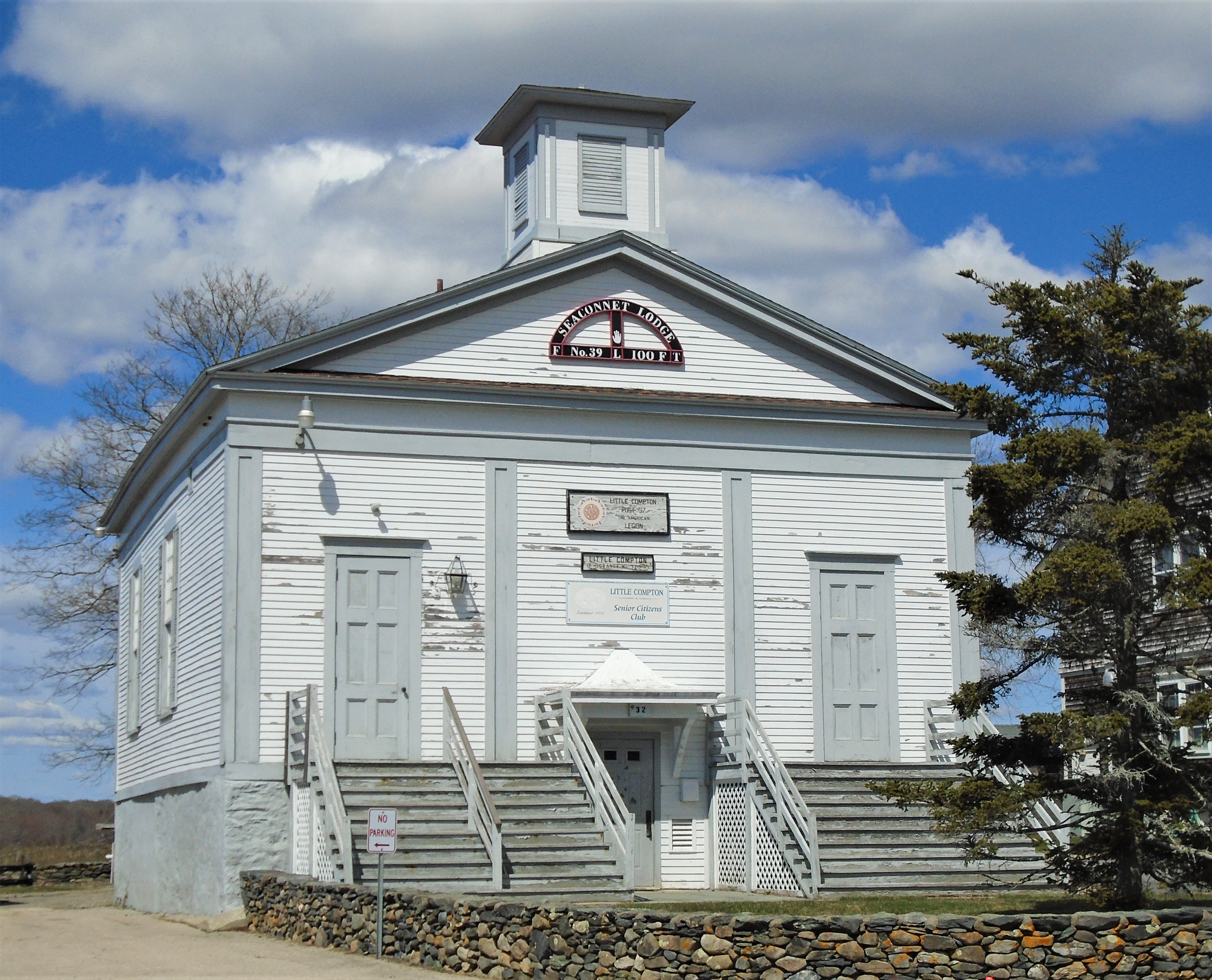
The Sakonnet Lodge was built in 1840 as a Methodist church. It is part of the Little Compton Common Historic District

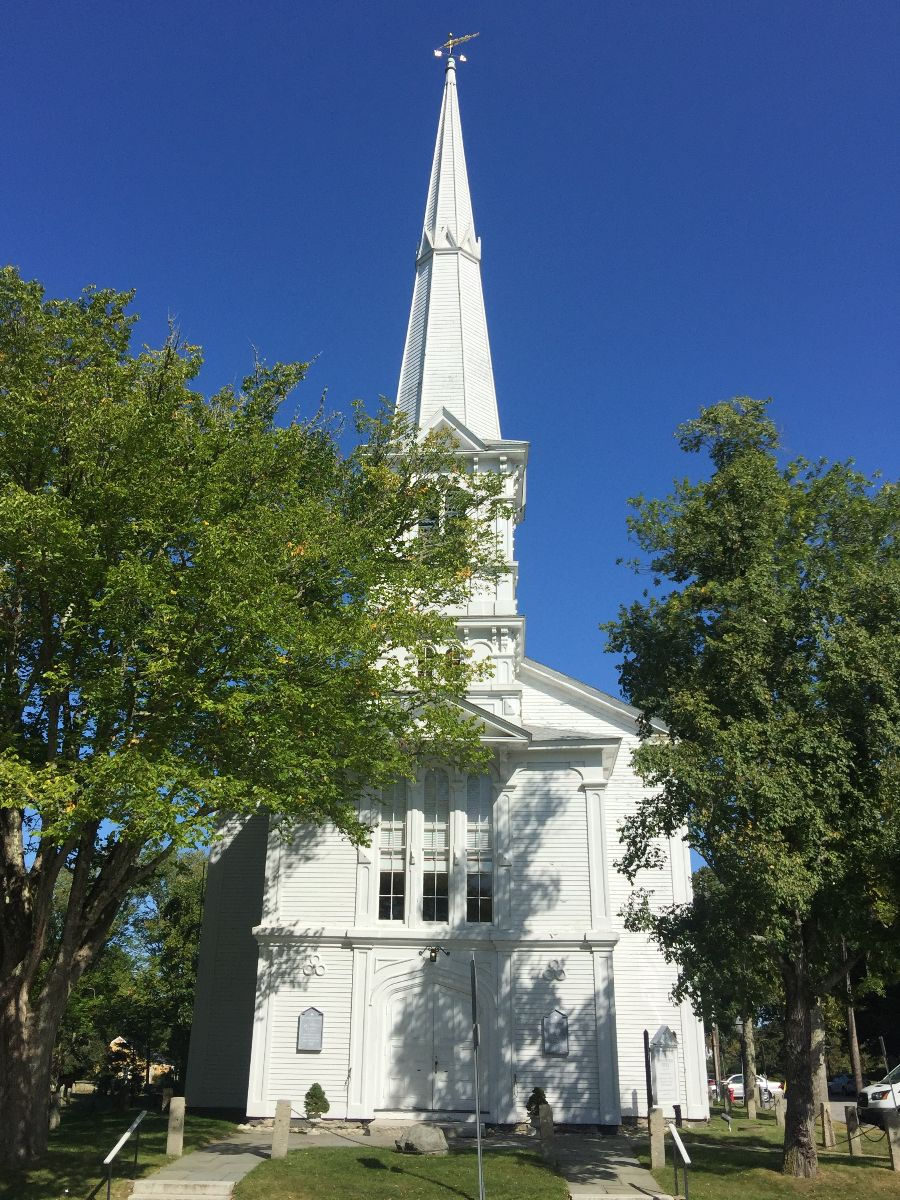
The United Congregational Church dates to 1704. The current meeting house was built in 1832. Its 100' steeple is the tallest structure in town.

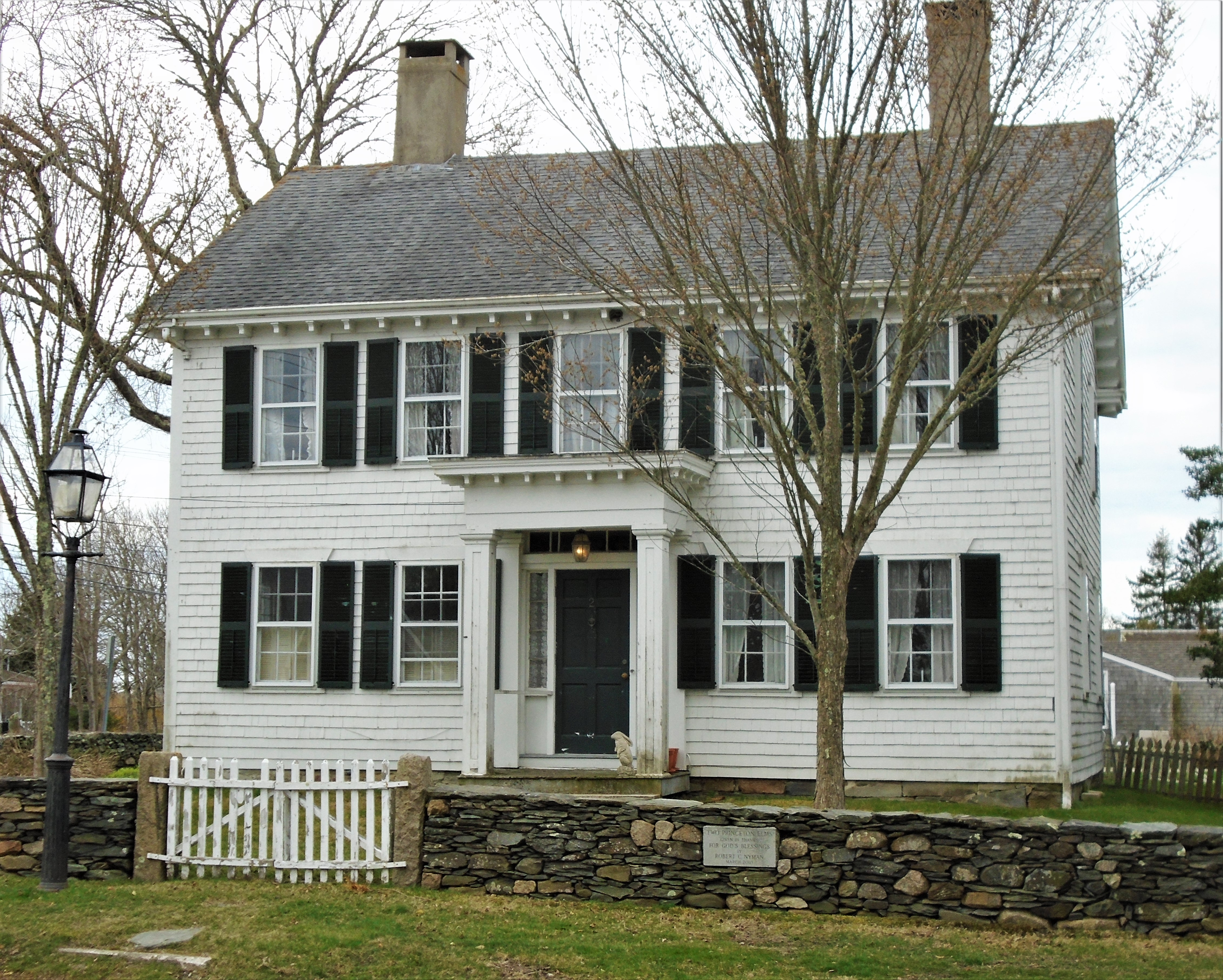
The First (or Old) Methodist Meeting House was originally built in another location in 1825, and moved to its current location in 1839 and a new front section was added.

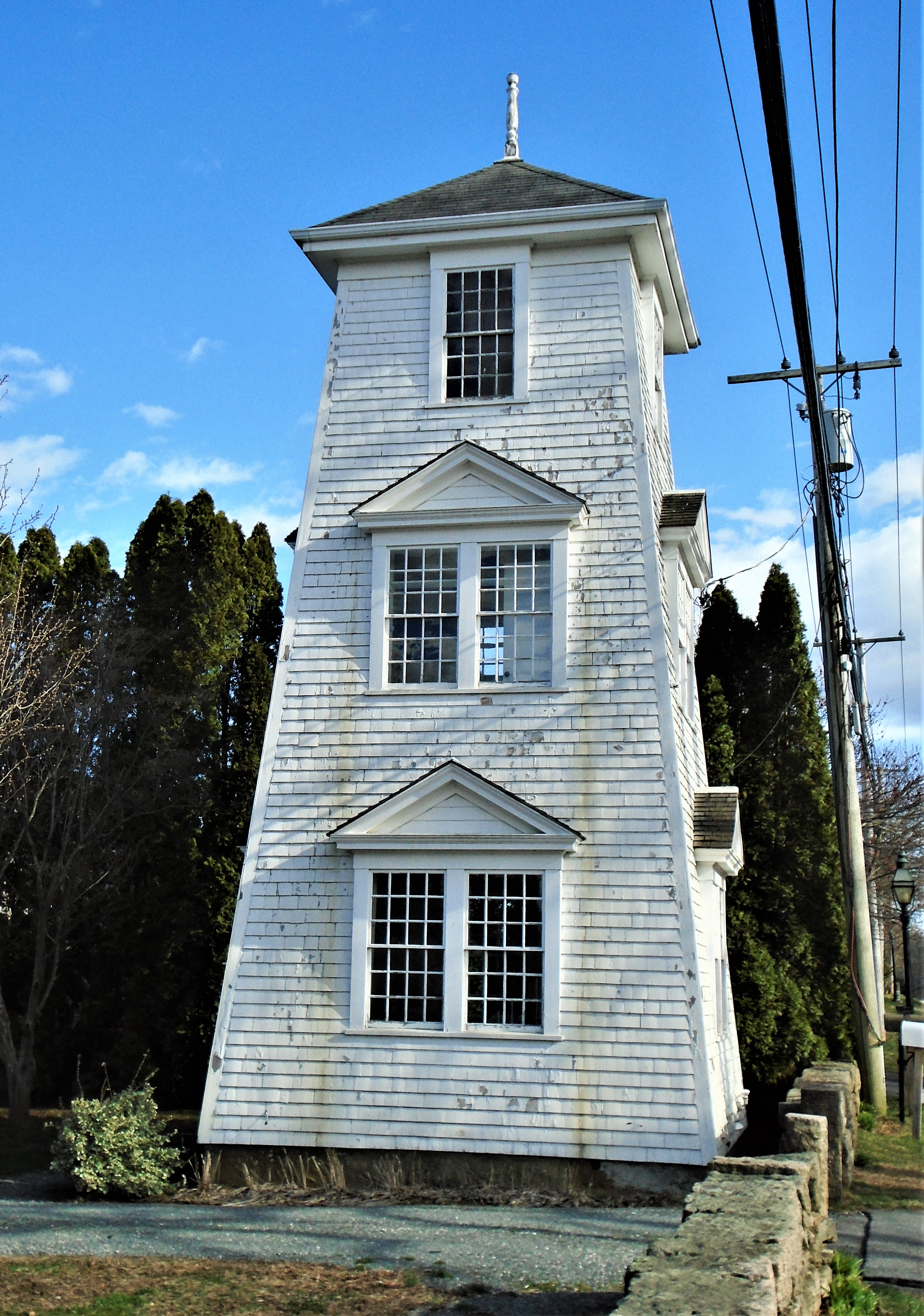
The "Spite Tower" in Adamsville, a hamlet of Little Compton, is a water tower which is purported to have been built out of spite.

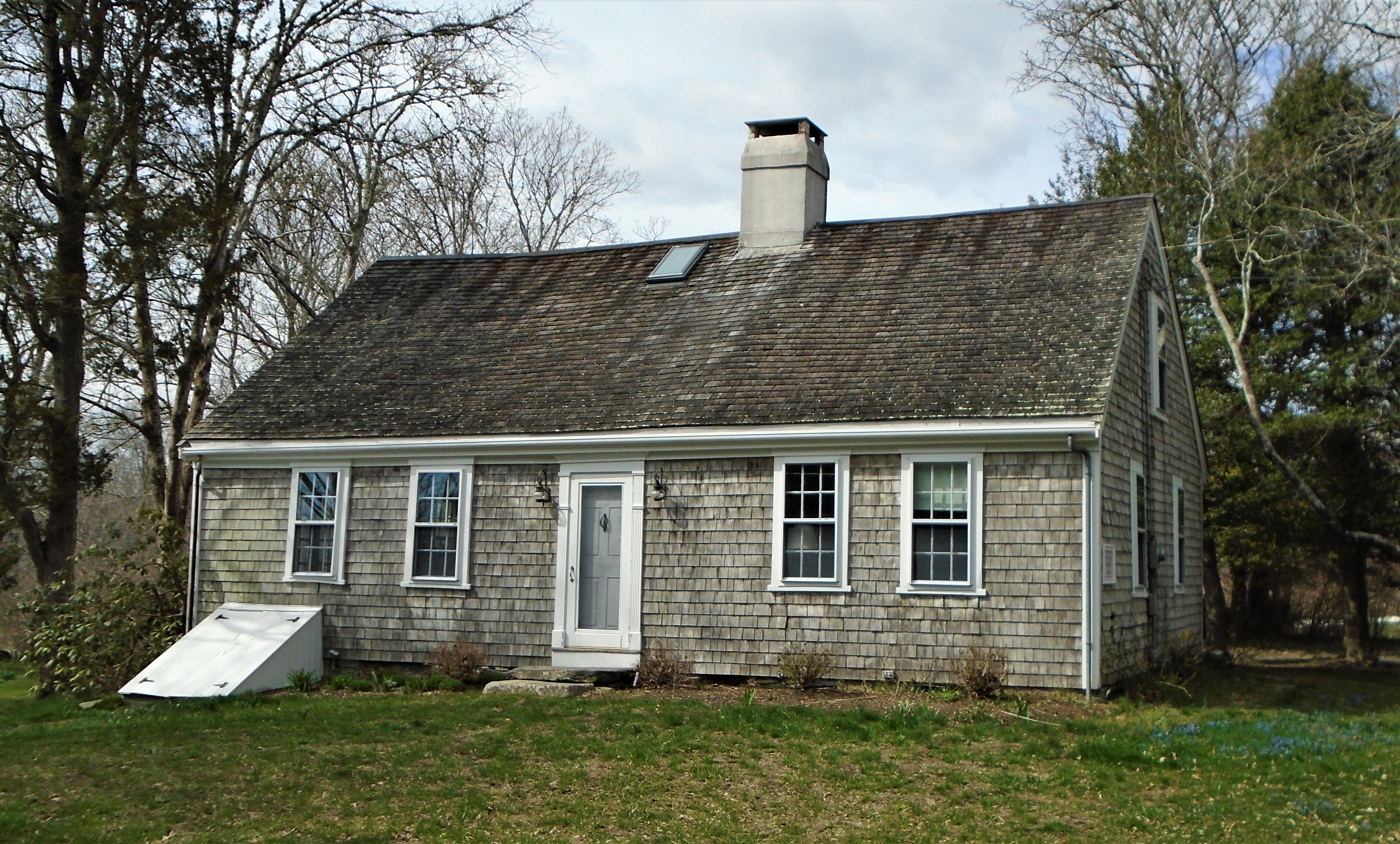
The William Whalley Homestead is a 19th-century farmstead which includes a house, barn and outbuilding.

== See also ==
- National Register of Historic Places listings in Newport County, Rhode Island
