= Stone House Inn =

Historic house in Rhode Island, United States

- U.S. National Register of Historic Places
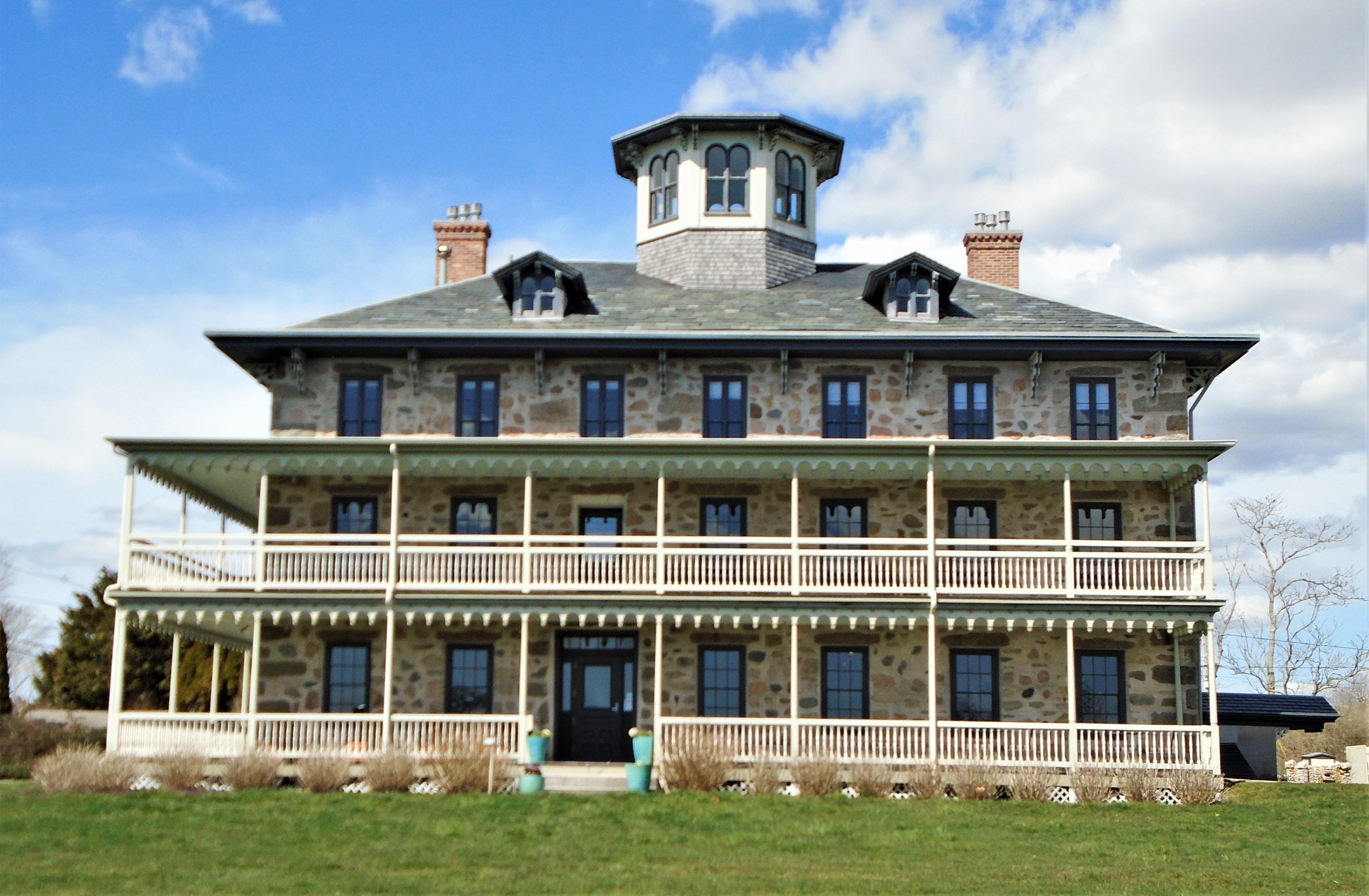
- (2021)

- Location within Rhode Island Location within the United States
- Location: 122 Sakonnet Rd., Little Compton, Rhode Island
- Coordinates: 41°27′58″N 71°11′11″W
- Built: 1854
- NRHP reference No.: 08000255
- Added to NRHP: April 2, 2008

The Stone House Inn, also known as the David Sisson House, located at 122 Sakonnet Point Road in Little Compton, Rhode Island, is a large four-story fieldstone residence – built in 1854 for David Sisson, a Providence-based industrialist – and its associated c.1886 barn. The structures sit on 2 acres (0.81 ha) of land overlooking Round Pond to the south, with a view of the Sakonnet River and Sakonnet Harbor to the west. When the house was completed, it was the largest single-family dwelling in that region and the only one built of stone.

The building was listed on the National Register of Historic Places in 2008.

== History ==
The four-story stone home was constructed in 1854 by David Sisson, an iron and textile manufacturer from Providence, Rhode Island, and was home also to his son Henry Tillinghast Sisson, a Civil War hero and Lt. Governor of Rhode Island from 1875 to 1877.

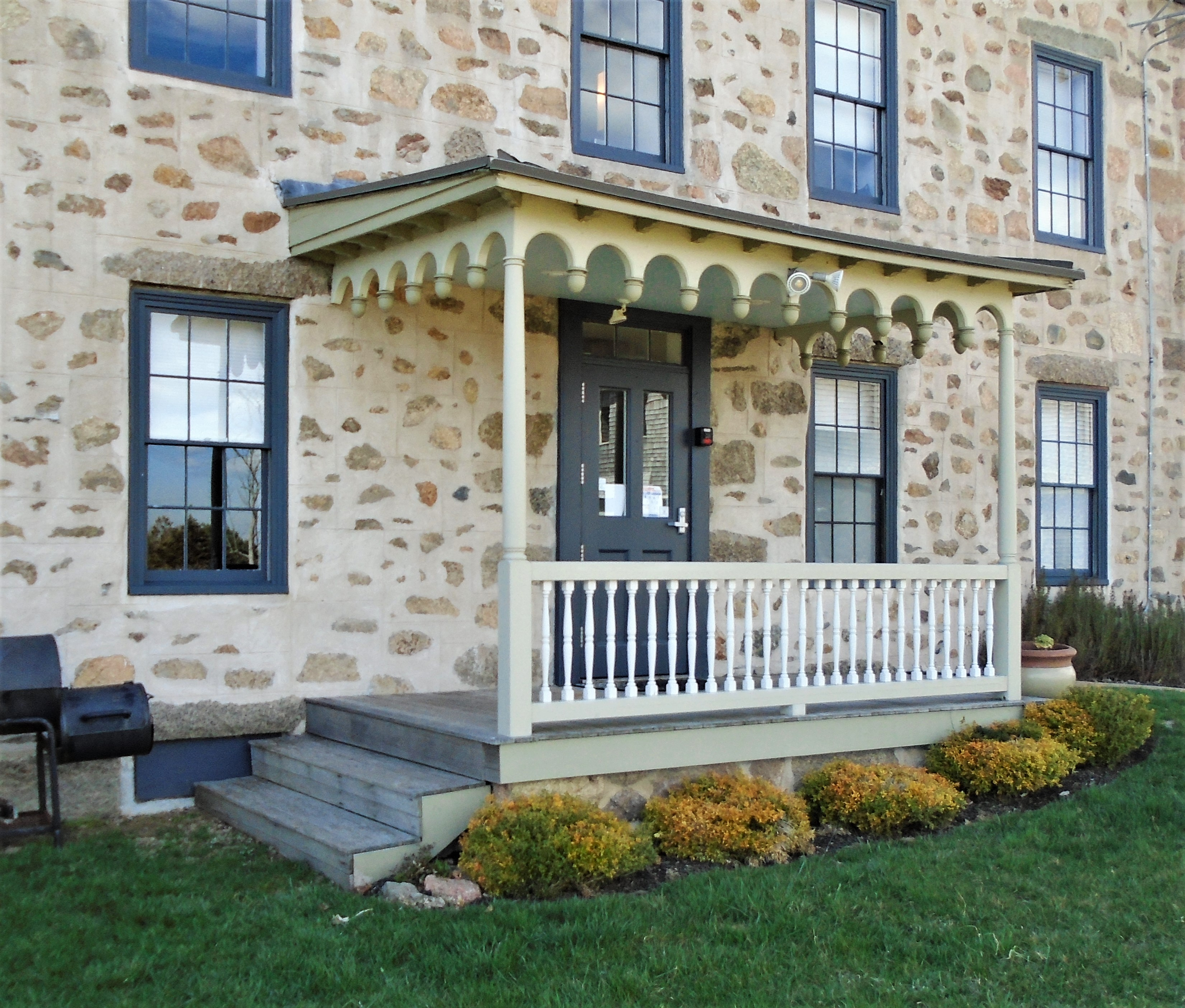
The entrance to the Tap Room

In 1902 the property was auctioned off, and was subsequently used as a boarding house and a country inn. A tavern called The Tap Room, designed Richard Kunnicutt, was built in the cellar in 1933, after the end of Prohibition. The Hurricane of 1938 flooded the building, destroyed the cupola and damaged the porches, and the Stone House remained closed for several decades.

In 1962, new owners renovated the building and opened it as the members-only Stone House Club. At around this time the barn was made over into an event space, with bar and catering kitchen. The property was sold in 1972 and again in 1975 to owners who operated it as an inn for over 30 years, after which it was bought by Stone House LLC, which reconstructed the porches and cupola.

Currently, the Stone House Inn is a bed and breakfast. Many green technologies have been incorporated—the heating and cooling systems rely on geothermal technology. It no longer hosts weddings or parties. There are five modern rooms in the barn, four suites on the inside of the main house and two two-bedroom suites in the main house.

== See also ==
- National Register of Historic Places listings in Newport County, Rhode Island
