= Sakonnet Light =

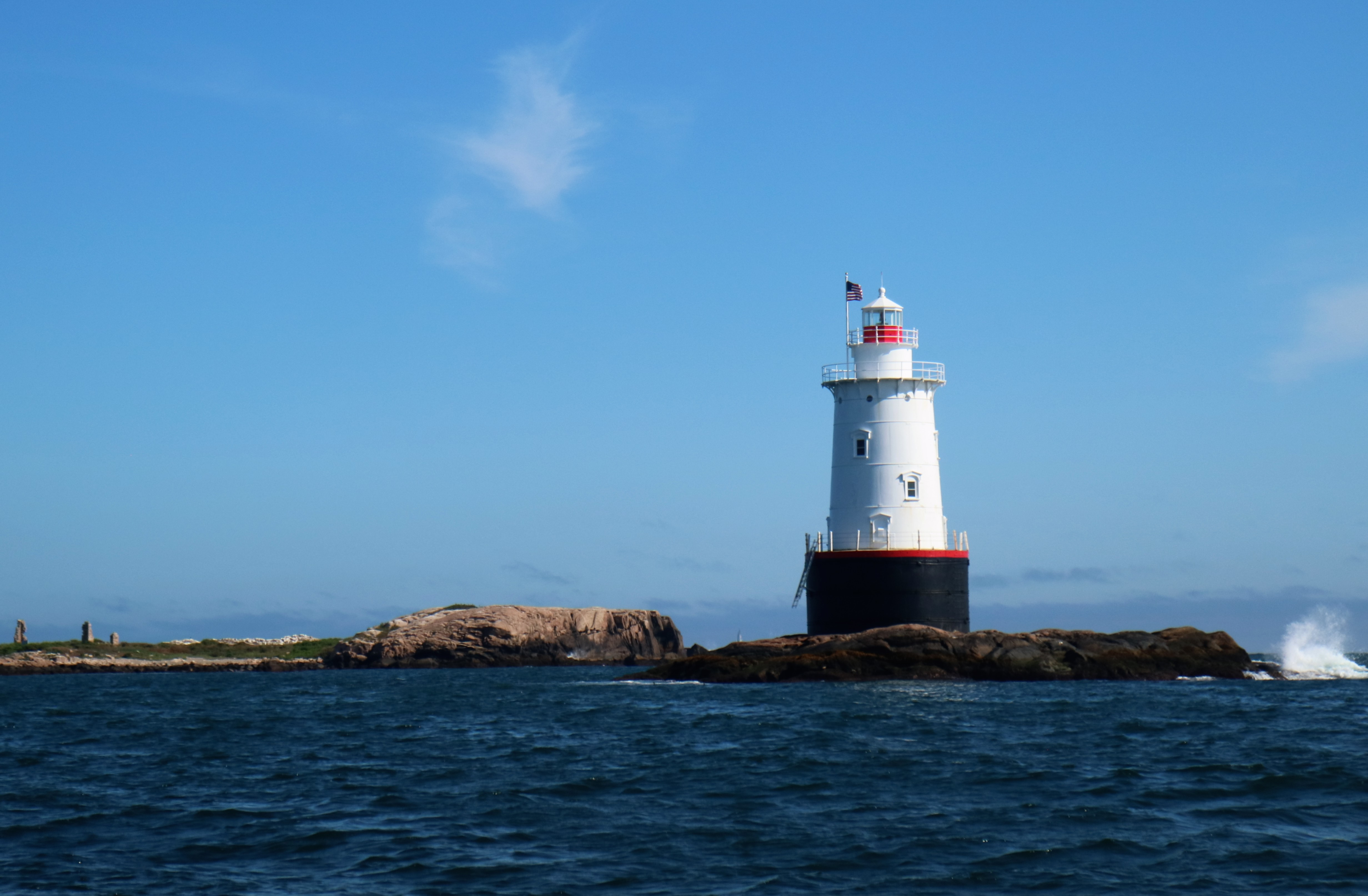
- Post-renovation (2012)
- Location: Newport County, United States
- Coordinates: 41°27′11.4″N 71°12′8.9″W

Tower
- Constructed: 1884
- Foundation: Concrete / Iron caisson on rock
- Construction: Cast iron with brick lining
- Height: 20 m (66 ft)
- Shape: Conical tower on cylindrical base
- Markings: White on black base
- Heritage: National Register of Historic Places listed place
- Fog signal: none

Light
- First lit: 1997
- Deactivated: 1955-1997
- Focal height: 58 feet (18 m)
- Lens: 4th order Fresnel lens, 1884
- Range: White sector 7 nautical miles (13 km; 8.1 mi) red 5 nautical miles (9.3 km; 5.8 mi)
- Characteristic: Flashing white, 6 seconds red sector
- Sakonnet Light Station
- U.S. National Register of Historic Places
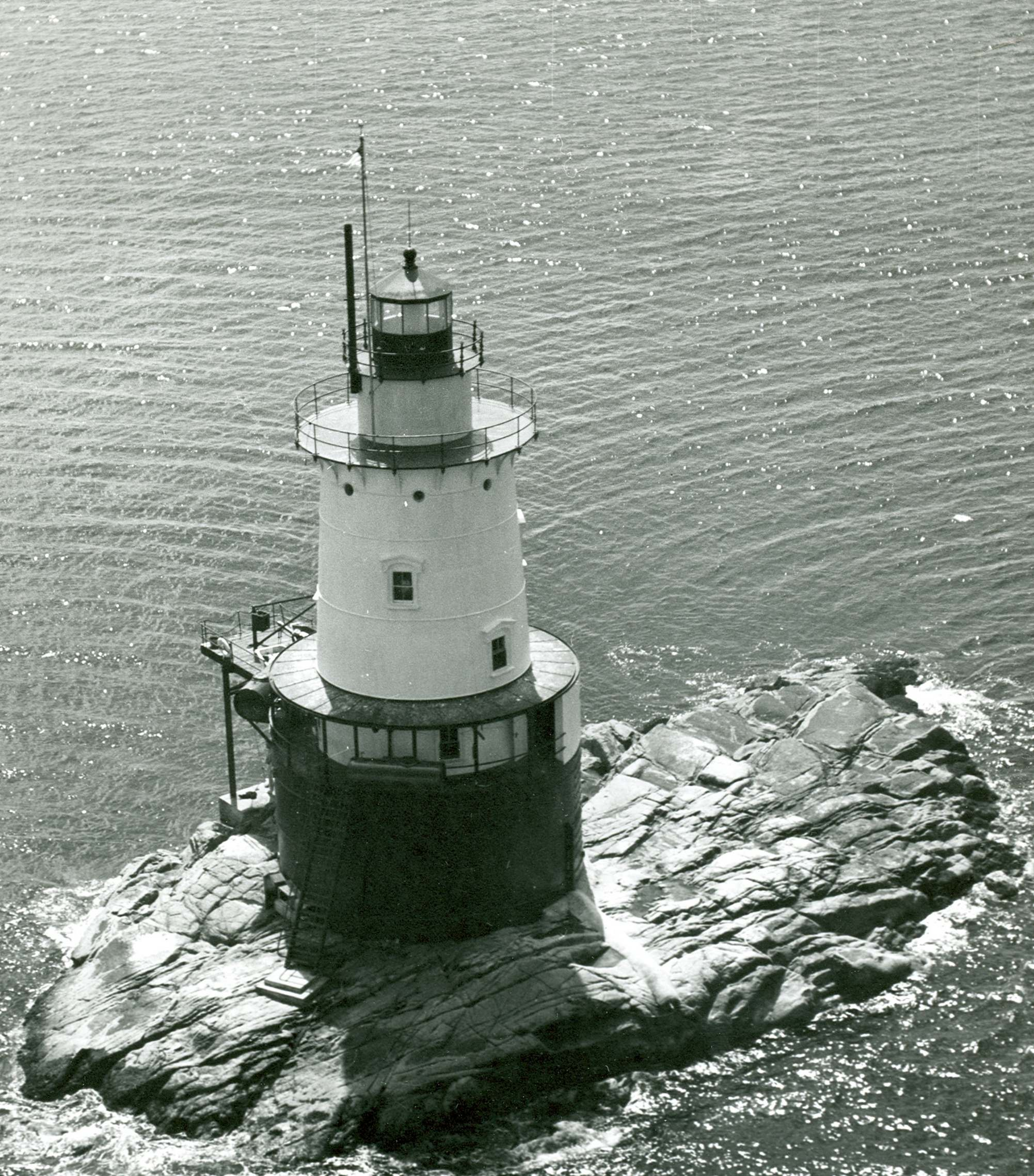
- Sakonnet Light in 2008
- Nearest city: Little Compton, Rhode Island
- MPS: Lighthouses of Rhode Island TR (AD)
- NRHP reference No.: 83000179
- Added to NRHP: February 10, 1983

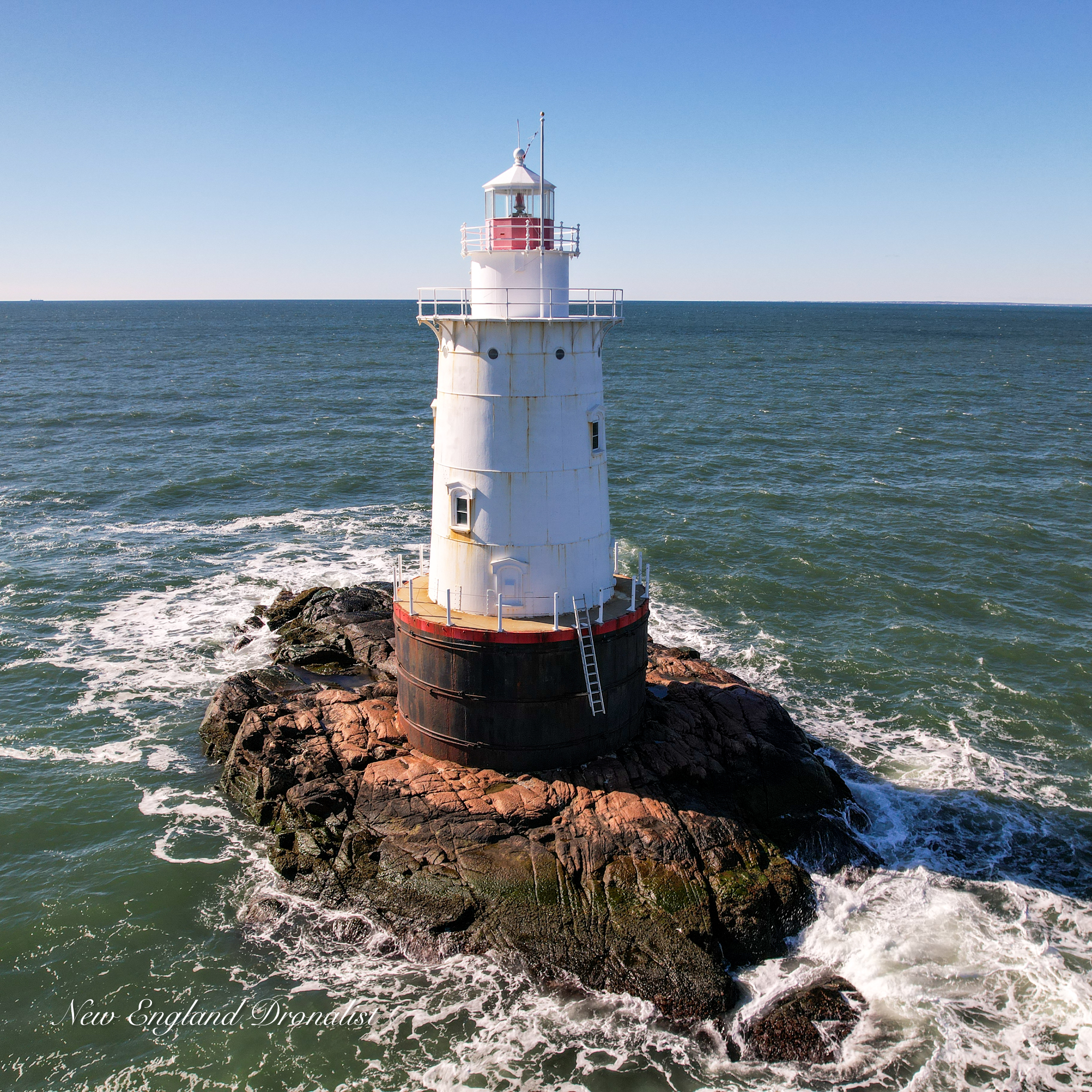

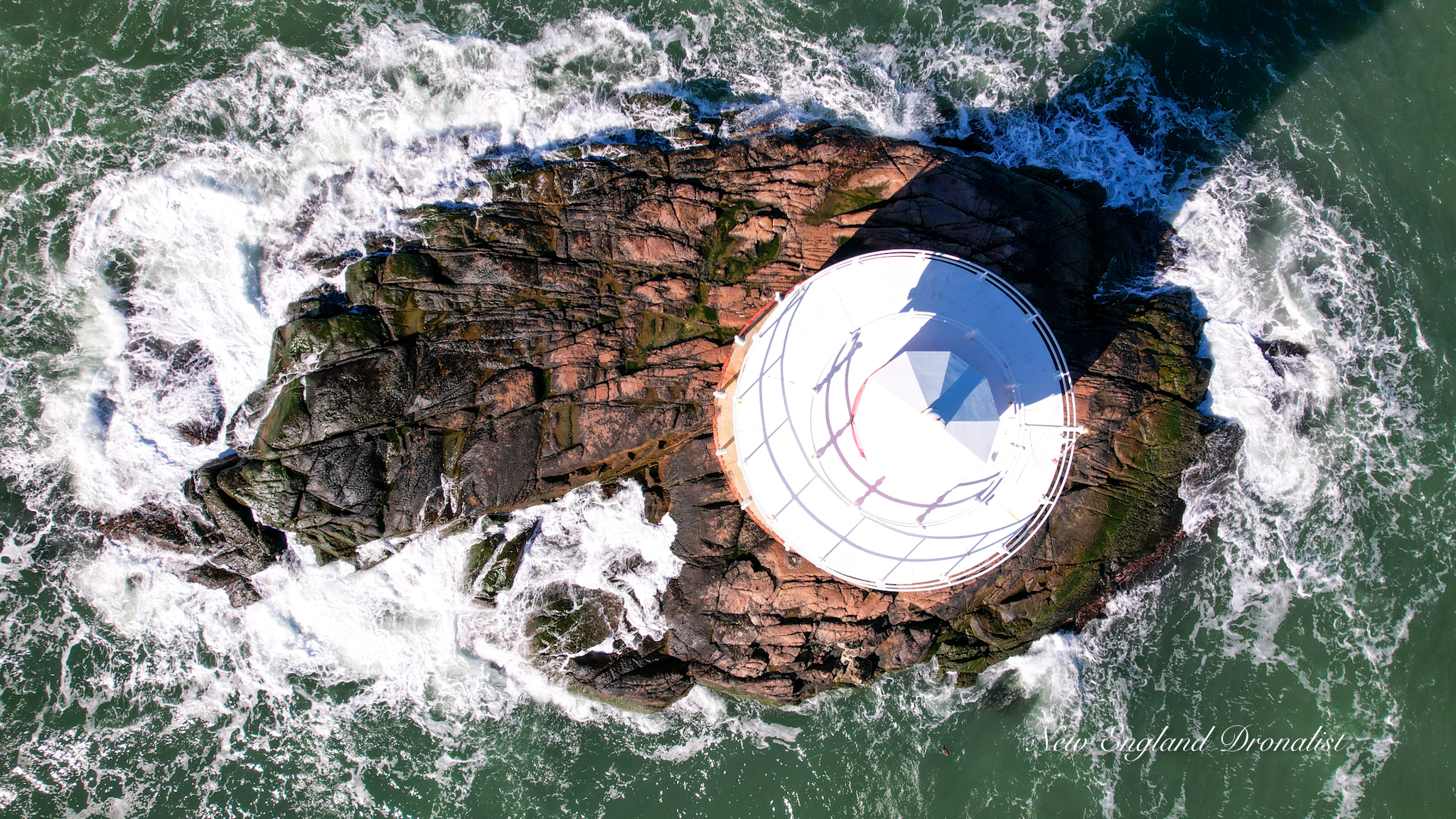

Sakonnet Light, built in 1884, is a sparkplug lighthouse near Sakonnet Point, Little Compton, Rhode Island, on the eastern side of the state.

The light was deactivated in 1954 after Hurricane Carol and was going to be destroyed, but local citizens protested, and eventually Carl and Carolyn Haffenreffer bought the lighthouse in 1961. Explaining his decision to purchase the lighthouse, Carl Haffenreffer said, "I was afraid someone was going to paint it pink or haul it away for scrap." The lighthouse was listed on the National Register of Historic Places in 1983. The Friends of Sakonnet Lighthouse acquired the lighthouse in 1985, and it was reactivated by the United States Coast Guard in 1997. A $1.45 million restoration of the lighthouse it was completed in 2012. The Friends of the Sakonnet Light were awarded the 2012 Rhody Award by the Rhode Island Historical Preservation and Heritage Commission for their work.

== See also ==
- National Register of Historic Places listings in Newport County, Rhode Island
