= National Register of Historic Places listings in Tiverton, Rhode Island =

This is a list of Registered Historic Places in Tiverton, Rhode Island, which has been transferred from and is an integral part of National Register of Historic Places listings in Newport County, Rhode Island.

Contents: Counties in Rhode Island

Bristol | Kent | Newport | Providence | Washington

This National Park Service list is complete through NPS recent listings posted April 3, 2026.

	Name on the Register	Image	Date listed	Location	City or town	Description
1	Bourne Mill	Bourne Mill	December 22, 2006 (#06001189)	844 State Ave. 41°40′12″N 71°10′41″W	Tiverton	Often grouped with the mills of nearby Fall River, Mass., but entirely within Rhode Island
2	Cook-Bateman Farm	Cook-Bateman Farm	October 11, 1979 (#79003775)	Fogland and Puncatest Neck Rds. 41°33′23″N 71°12′07″W	Tiverton	
3	First Baptist Church of Tiverton	First Baptist Church of Tiverton	July 30, 2013 (#13000569)	7 Old Stone Church Rd. 41°33′42″N 71°08′34″W	Tiverton	
4	Fort Barton Site	Fort Barton Site	March 7, 1973 (#73000056)	Lawton and Highland Aves. 41°37′47″N 71°12′37″W	Tiverton	
5	Osborn-Bennett Historic District	Osborn-Bennett Historic District	December 22, 2005 (#05001460)	1137, 1148, 1168, 1188 Main Rd. 41°38′35″N 71°11′55″W	Tiverton	
6	Tiverton Four Corners Historic District	Tiverton Four Corners Historic District	June 20, 1974 (#74000042)	Roughly bounded by Main, West and East Rds. 41°34′17″N 71°11′18″W	Tiverton	

== See also ==
- National Register of Historic Places listings in Newport County, Rhode Island
- List of National Historic Landmarks in Rhode Island
