= Quaket River =

Tidal inlet in Rhode Island, USA

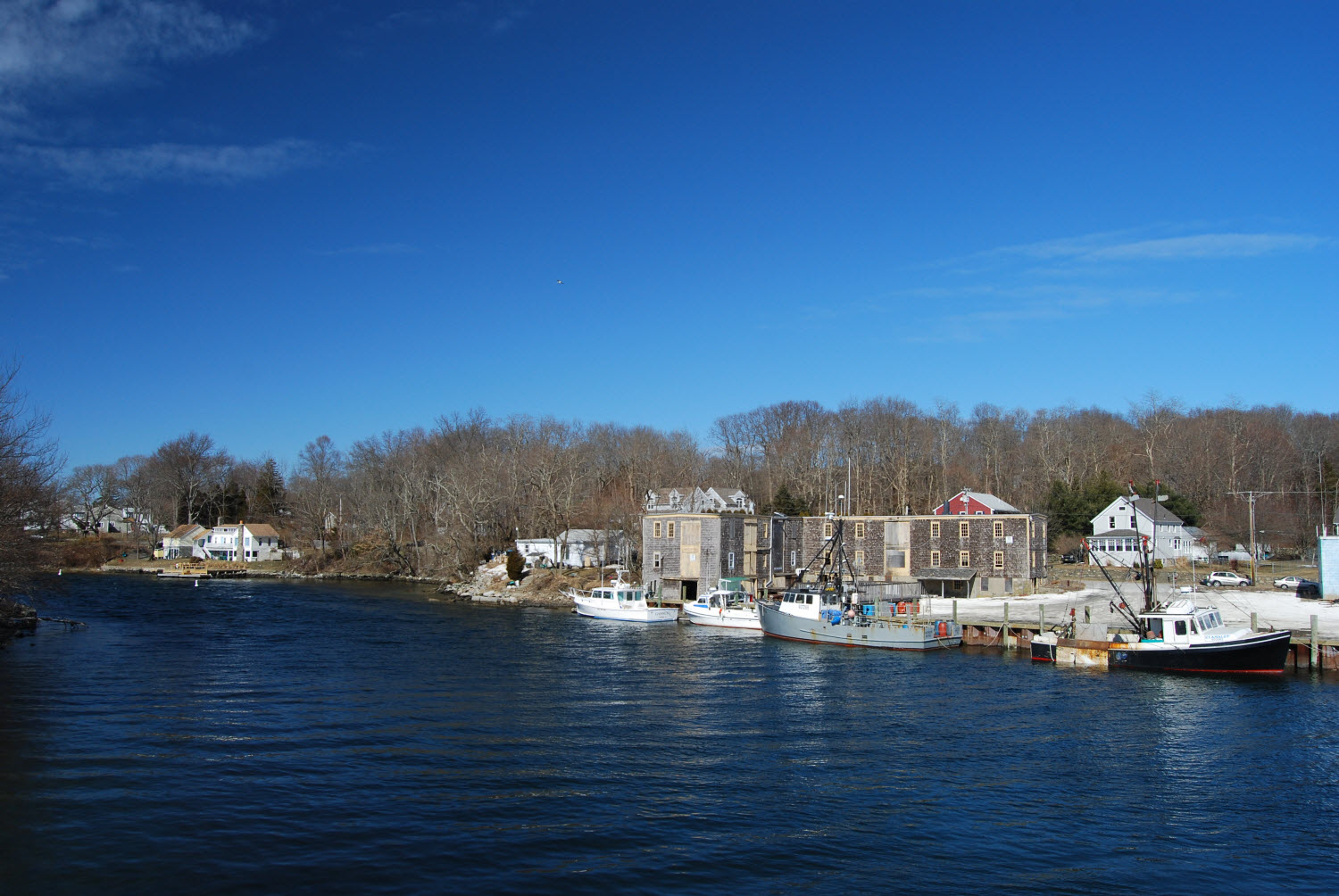
- View of Quaket River from Nanaquaket Bridge, Tiverton, Rhode Island

- Location within Rhode Island

Physical characteristics
- Source: Nannaquaket Pond
  - coordinates: 41°37′03″N 71°12′25″W
- Mouth
  - location: Sakonnet River
  - coordinates: 41°37′09″N 71°12′36″W

Basin features
- Progression: Nannaquaket Pond → Quaket River → Sakonnet River → Narragansett Bay → Rhode Island Sound → Atlantic Ocean
- Bridges: Nanaquaket Bridge

The Quaket River is a tidal inlet, in the U.S. state of Rhode Island. It flows approximately 0.6 mi (0.97 km) from the mouth of Nannaquaket Pond into the Sakonnet River. It is located entirely within the town of Tiverton, Rhode Island.

== Crossings ==
Nannaquaket Road in Tiverton is the only crossing over the Quaket River.

== Tributaries ==
The Quaket River has no direct named tributaries, however Nannaquaket Pond (the river's source) is fed by Quaket Creek, Sin and Flesh Brook and White Wine Brook.

== See also ==
- List of rivers of Rhode Island
- Sakonnet River
