= Sakonnet River rail bridge =

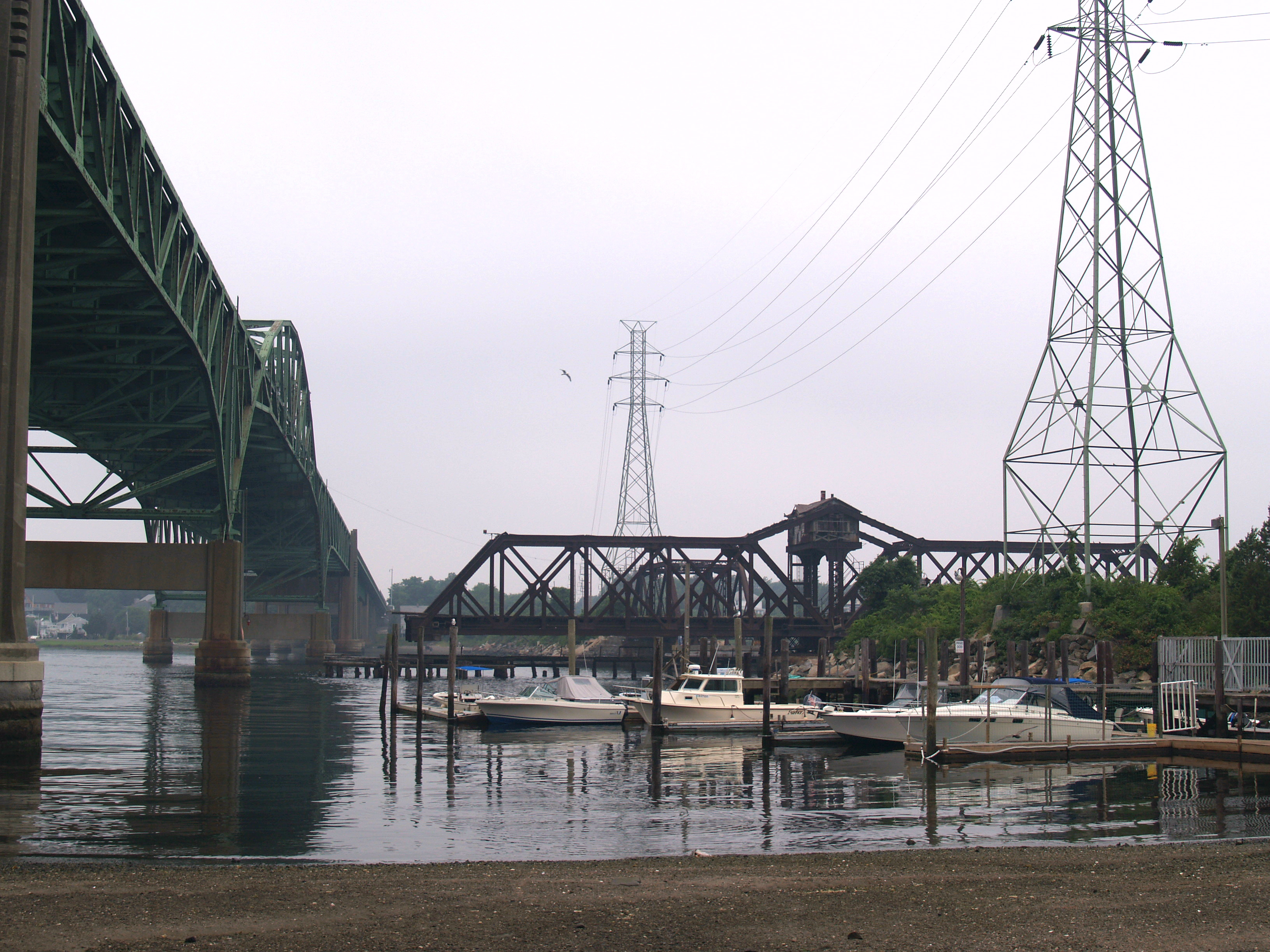
- The former bridge in 2005
- Coordinates: 41.638926°N 71.2132°W
- Carries: Newport Secondary
- Crosses: Sakonnet River
- Locale: between Portsmouth and Tiverton

Characteristics
- Design: swing bridge

History
- Opened: 1899
- Closed: 1988 (removed 2006–07)

Location
- Interactive map of Sakonnet River rail bridge

The Sakonnet River rail bridge was a swing bridge that spanned the Sakonnet River between Portsmouth and Tiverton, Rhode Island, and provided the only rail link between Aquidneck Island (Newport Secondary) and the mainland. It was closed in 1988 and removed in 2006–07

== History ==
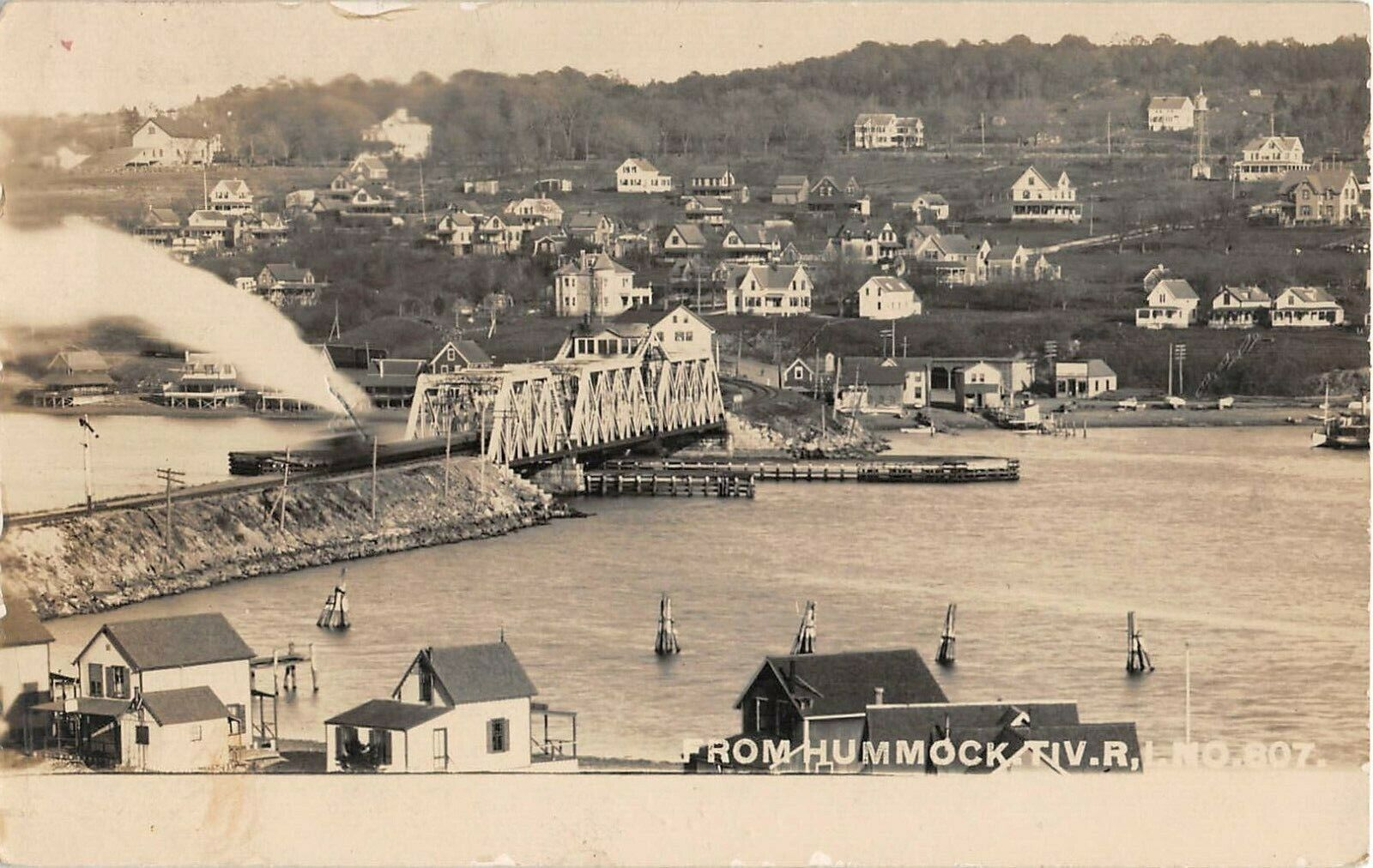
1910 postcard of the bridge

The first drawbridge at the site was built when the Newport and Fall River Railroad opened in 1864. It was replaced with an iron span in 1879. A new span was built in 1899 by the Pennsylvania Steel Company and served a succession of railroads; the Providence and Worcester Railroad took over the line in 1982.

The bridge was removed from service in 1980 after being damaged by an overweight train loaded with military equipment, which severed the rail connection to the island. The swing bridge was left in the open position to allow boat traffic to pass. In 1988 a barge ran into the bridge. Since then, equipment for the Newport and Narragansett Bay Railroad, a tourist railroad on the island, has been brought in by barge. The bridge swing structure was removed in late 2006 and the supporting piers were demolished by explosion on February 9, 2007. Only the bridge itself was formally abandoned; the tracks on either side are considered formally active to allow future restoration of service.

After the Anthony Road overpass in Portsmouth was rebuilt in 2019, work was done repairing several washouts to allow use to end of track. The tourist train ran past the Hummocks station built in 2017 to the end of the track on June 15, 2021 to the Sakonnet River rail bridge site. This was the first Old Colony & Newport train past the derail about 200 feet (61 m) from the bridge's western pier. The last train from the previous operators on this segment was 1988.

At Hummocks station, the first station south of the bridge site, Rail Explorers runs a rail-based pedal-powered vehicle excursion service. The railroad track now officially ends at a bumper post at the foot of an electrical transmission tower on the bridge's western pier point. The Newport & Narragansett Bay Railroad now regularly operates its Dinner Train to the bumper post.
