= Stone Bridge (Rhode Island) =

Former bridge in the United States

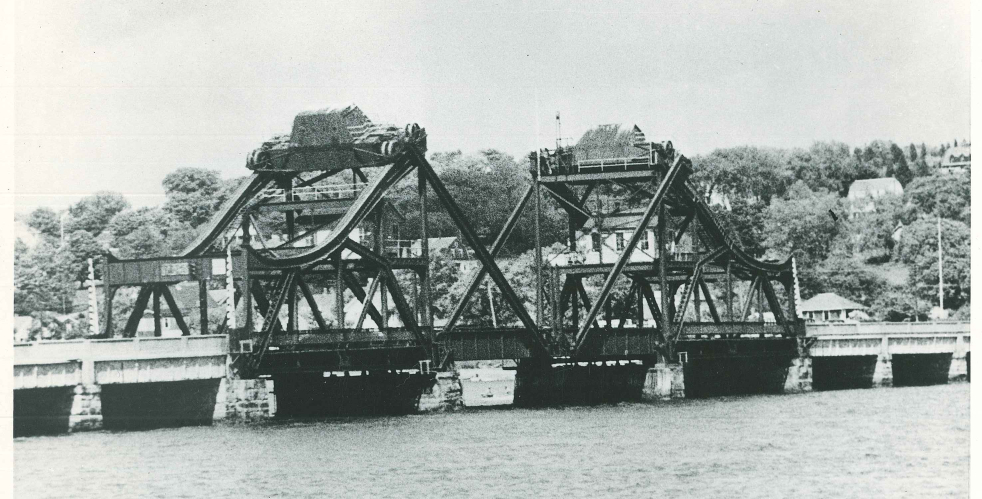
- Coordinates: 41.62573°N 71.21716°W
- Carries: Route 138
- Crosses: Sakonnet River
- Locale: Portsmouth and Tiverton, Rhode Island

Characteristics
- Design: steel

History
- Opened: 1795, 1810, 1907
- Closed: 1956

The Stone Bridge was a bascule bridge that carried Rhode Island Route 138 over the Sakonnet River between Portsmouth and Tiverton. The span was built in 1907, replacing an earlier wooden bridge. It was severely damaged by Hurricane Carol in 1954, and replaced in 1956 by the Sakonnet River Bridge.

== History ==
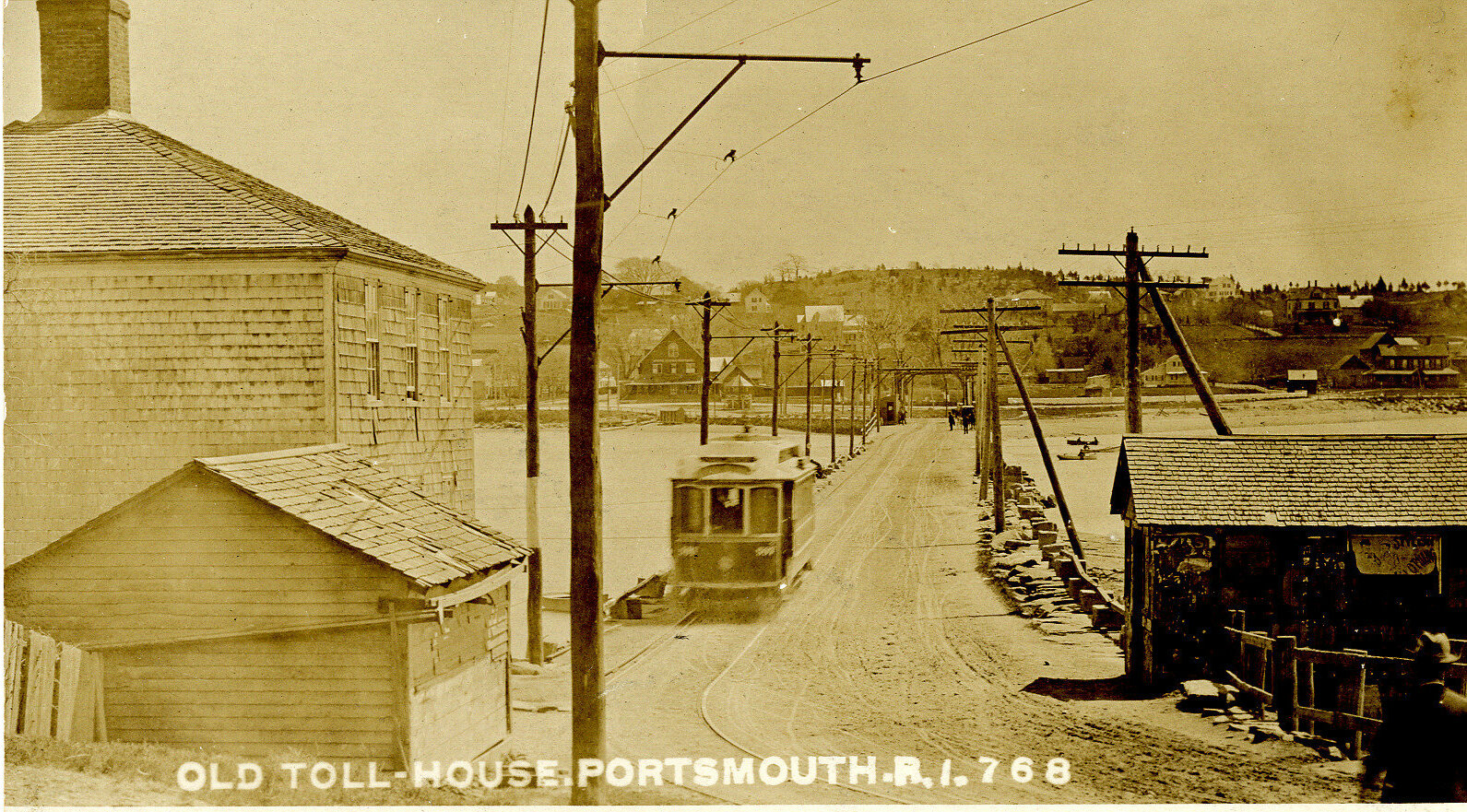
A streetcar crossing the bridge prior to 1907

A ferry between Portsmouth and Tiverton – probably the first regular ferry in Rhode Island – began operating in 1640. It was variously known as Howland's Ferry (after the family that ran it from around 1703 to 1776), Pocasset Ferry, Sanford's Ferry and Wanton's Ferry. A privately owned wooden toll bridge was built in 1795. After it was destroyed several times by storms, a stone causeway with a wooden draw span was built in 1810. The towns of Tiverton and Portsmouth purchased the bridge in 1871 and conveyed it to the state.

The Newport Street Railway opened in 1898 between Newport and Fall River, Massachusetts. The heavy streetcars necessitated replacement of the wooden draw span. A double-leaf steel rolling lift bridge opened in 1907.

The bridge was severely damaged by Hurricane Carol in 1954, and replaced in 1956 by the Sakonnet River Bridge, which was under construction at the time of the hurricane, located 0.8 miles (1.3 km) to the north. The span was closed to marine traffic after the hurricane. After inspection, it was decided to close the bridge to bus and truck traffic on January 13, 1955. It was then closed to all vehicles on January 18, 1955. Pedestrians were allowed to walk across. Repairs were made and the bridge reopened to all traffic on March 3, 1955. It remained in service until the opening of the Sakonnet River Bridge in 1956.

The remaining approaches serve as breakwaters and fishing piers.
