= Sakonnet River =

Tidal strait in eastern Rhode Island, United States

Coordinates: 41.471072°N 71.223935°W

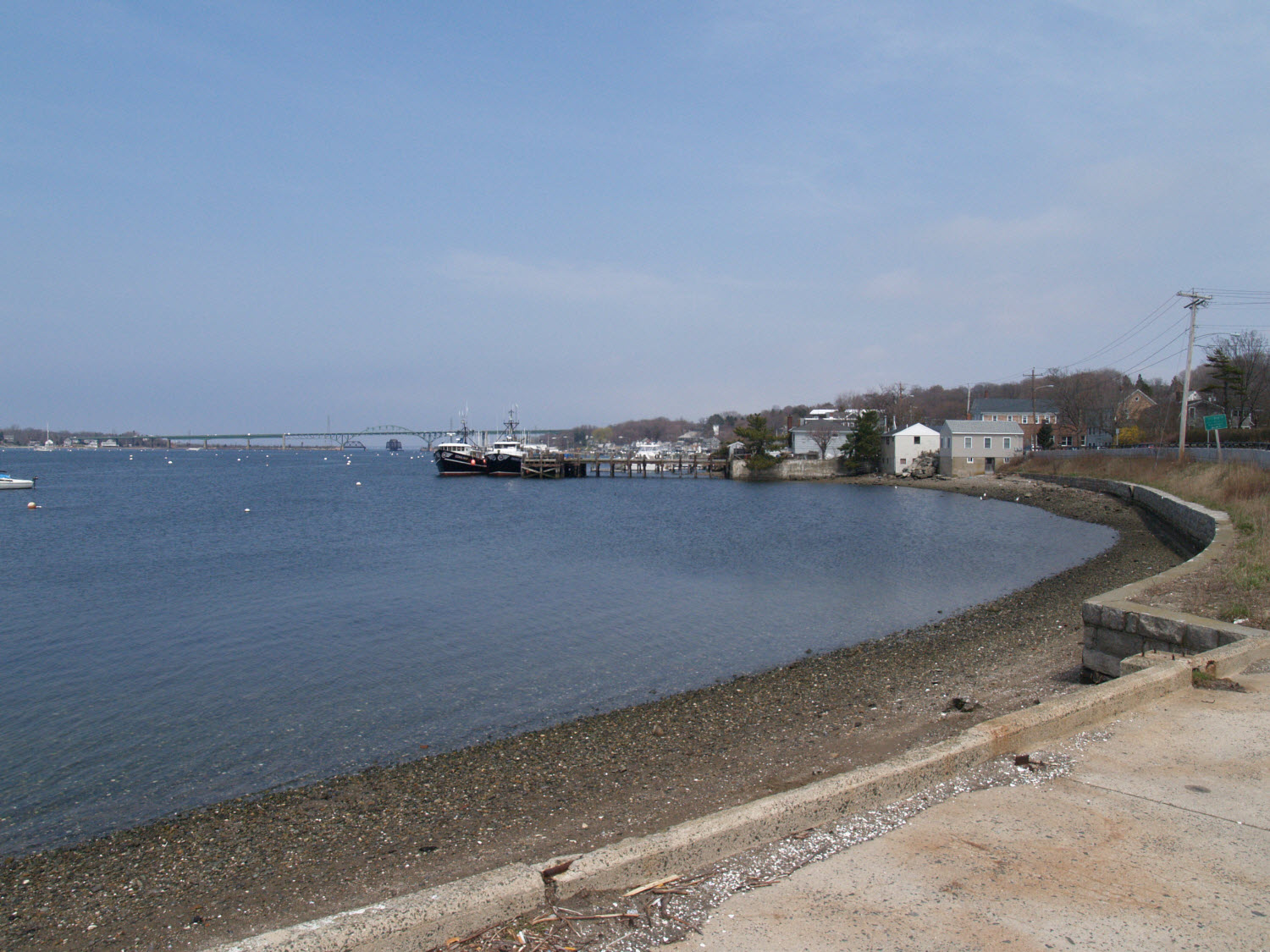
- View of Sakonnet River looking north from Tiverton

Location
- Country: United States
- State: Rhode Island
- County: Newport County
- Towns: Tiverton, Little Compton, Portsmouth, Middletown, Newport

Physical characteristics
- Source: Mount Hope Bay
- Mouth: Rhode Island Sound
- Length: 14 mi (22.5 km)
- Width
  - minimum: 0.3 mi (0.5 km)
  - average: 0.7 mi (1.3 km)
  - maximum: 2 mi (3.2 km)
- Depth
  - average: 20 ft (6.1 m)

Basin features
- Waterbodies: Almy Creek, Little Brook, Quaket River, Sapowet Creek
- Bridges: Sakonnet River Bridge, Sakonnet River Rail Bridge (demolished), Stone Bridge (demolished)
- Inland ports: Sakonnet Harbor

The Sakonnet River is a tidal strait in the state of Rhode Island which flows approximately 14 miles (23 km) between Mount Hope Bay and Rhode Island Sound. It separates Aquidneck Island from the eastern portion of Newport County.

== Etymology ==
"Sakonnet" is derived from the Sakonnet people, related to the Wampanoag people who spoke a dialect of the Massachusett language, that inhabited the surrounding area. The name has been interpreted in a variety of ways including "where the water pours forth".

== Crossings ==
Below is a list of all current and former crossings over the Sakonnet River. The list begins at the headwaters and goes downstream.

- Sakonnet River Rail Bridge (formerly Old Colony and Newport Railway), removed
- Old Sakonnet River Bridge (RI 24/138)
- Replacement Sakonnet River Bridge; opened September 2012.
- Stone Bridge (formerly RI 138, destroyed by Hurricane Carol in 1954)

== Tributaries ==
- Almy Creek
- Little Creek (Rhode Island)
- Quaket River
  - Sin and Flesh Brook
- Sapowet Creek

== See also ==
- List of rivers in Rhode Island
- Narragansett Bay
