= Sin and Flesh Brook =

Sin and Flesh Brook Sin & Flesh Brook, Sin and Flesh Brook, Sinning Flesh Brook, Sinning Flesh River, Sin and Flesh River, Sin & Flesh River
- Location within Rhode Island Location within the United States
- Etymology: Slaying and mutilation of Zoeth Howland

Location
- Country: United States
- U.S. state: Rhode Island
- County: Newport County
- Town: Tiverton

Physical characteristics
- Source
  - coordinates: 41°38′44″N 71°10′51″W
- Mouth
  - location: Nannaquaket Pond
  - coordinates: 41°37′9″N 71°12′12″W

Basin features
- Landmarks: Fort Barton Site
- Tributaries
  - left: one unnamed tributary
  - right: three unnamed tributaries
- Bridges: Rhode Island Route 24, Industrial Way, Fish Road, Highland Road

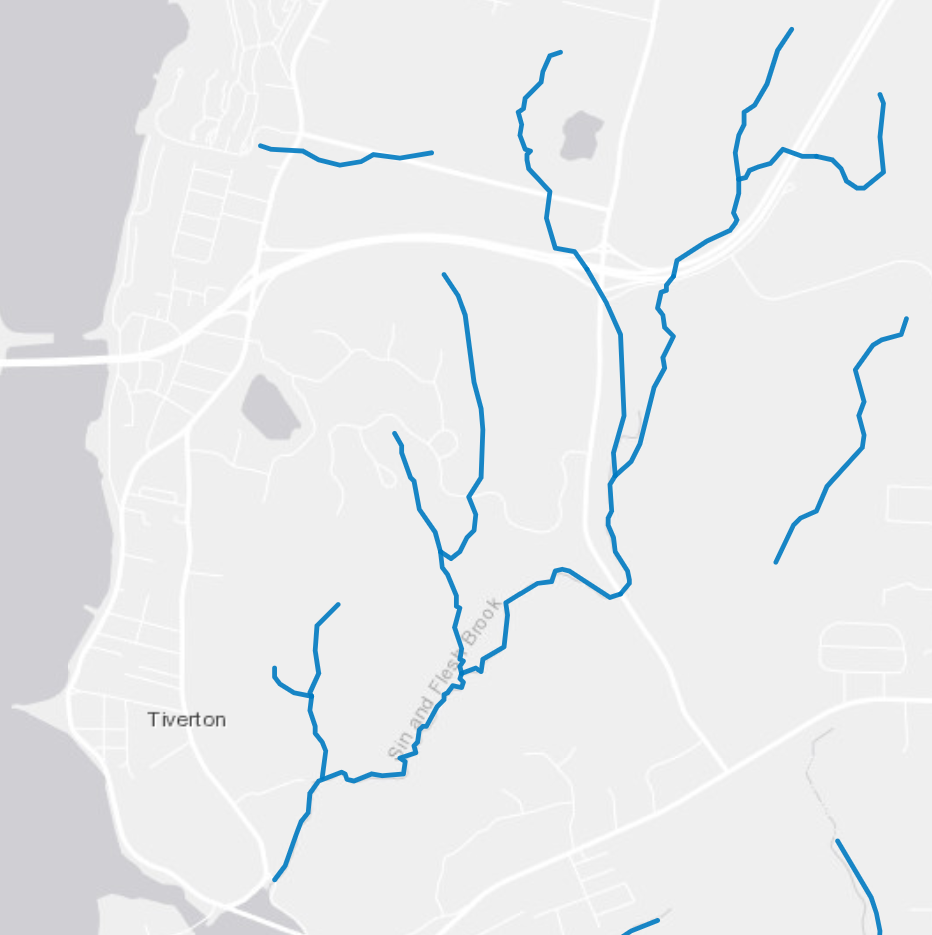
Sin and Flesh Brook in Tiverton, Rhode Island, US

Sin and Flesh Brook is a stream in Rhode Island, United States. It and all tributaries are entirely within the town of Tiverton.

== Geography ==
The stream starts north of Rhode Island Route 24, flowing southwest before emptying into Nannaquaket Pond. From source to mouth, the stream is only about 3.2 miles (5.1 km) long. The bridge near the mouth is called the Snell Bridge. It can be seen from trails in the Sin and Flesh Brook Natural Area behind the Fort Barton Site. Most of the underlying rock is granite, but there is some whitish, fine-grained micaceous schist near the northern reaches, as well as some hornblendic schist.

== History ==
Sin and Flesh Brook got its unusual name from an event on 28 March 1676. Quaker colonist Zoeth Howland (occasionally written as "Zoar Howland" or "Low Howland") was traveling from Dartmouth, Massachusetts to Newport, Rhode Island during King Philip's War when he was killed by a group of six indigenous men. This was only three months after hundreds of Narragansett villagers were killed in the Great Swamp Fight across Narragansett Bay in South Kingstown, Rhode Island. Howland's mutilated body was later found in the unnamed stream, and local colonists started to call it Sinning Flesh River, which over time drifted to the current name.

Only one of the assailants was named, appearing in court records as Manasses Molasses. Molasses was tried before a court-martial without a jury in August 1676, and the evidence against him was described as inconclusive and hearsay. Molasses denied involvement with the killing, but admitted to buying Howland's coat for some ground nuts. Molasses stated that the killer was someone named Quasquomack. A resident of Portsmouth, Rhode Island named John Cook also testified at the court-martial that in the area of Puncatest in July he asked a group of indigenous people, named Woodcock, Matowat, and Job, if they knew who killed Howland. Cook stated he was told "there were six in the company and that Molasses was the Indian that fetched him out of the water". John Brigs testified that Molasses had also shot at someone named Joseph Russell. William Manchester testified that he asked the husband of Wetamoe, Peter Nonoet, who killed Howland, and was merely told that Molasses fetched him from the water. An unnamed sister of Awetamoes testified that a member of the group that attacked Howland by the name of Ohom told her that Molasses was also part of the group and took Howland from the water. A man named Wechunckfum/Abram testified that Molasses had confessed to killing an Englishman in the area. The wife of Sukats testified to a similar confession. The court-martial was persuaded by the testimony against Manasses Molasses and he was exiled and sold into slavery.

In the 1700s, a gristmill and a sawmill were built on the river by Aaron and Moses Barker. Sylvanus Nickerson opened a thread mill here circa 1844 until his death in 1857. It was then operated by Samuel Thurston and Oliver Chase before being taken over by Daniel T. Church. In 2018, preservation work was ordered for the historic bridge over the river at Old Main Road. In November 2022, the state of Rhode Island replaced the existing bridge that carried Fish Road over the river with a new one made from prefabricated bridge units at the cost of $926,000. The bridge was carrying around 9,000 vehicles each day.

== Ecology ==
The stream flows through areas of floodplain forest. Oaks, hollies, maples, and ferns populate the forest. Several species of ants are found on its banks. The brook has high levels of Enterococcus bacteria. Possibly this is related to treated wastewater from Tiverton Junior-Senior High School flowing into the river. In the 20th century, it was stocked with brook trout.
