= Sakonnet River Bridge =

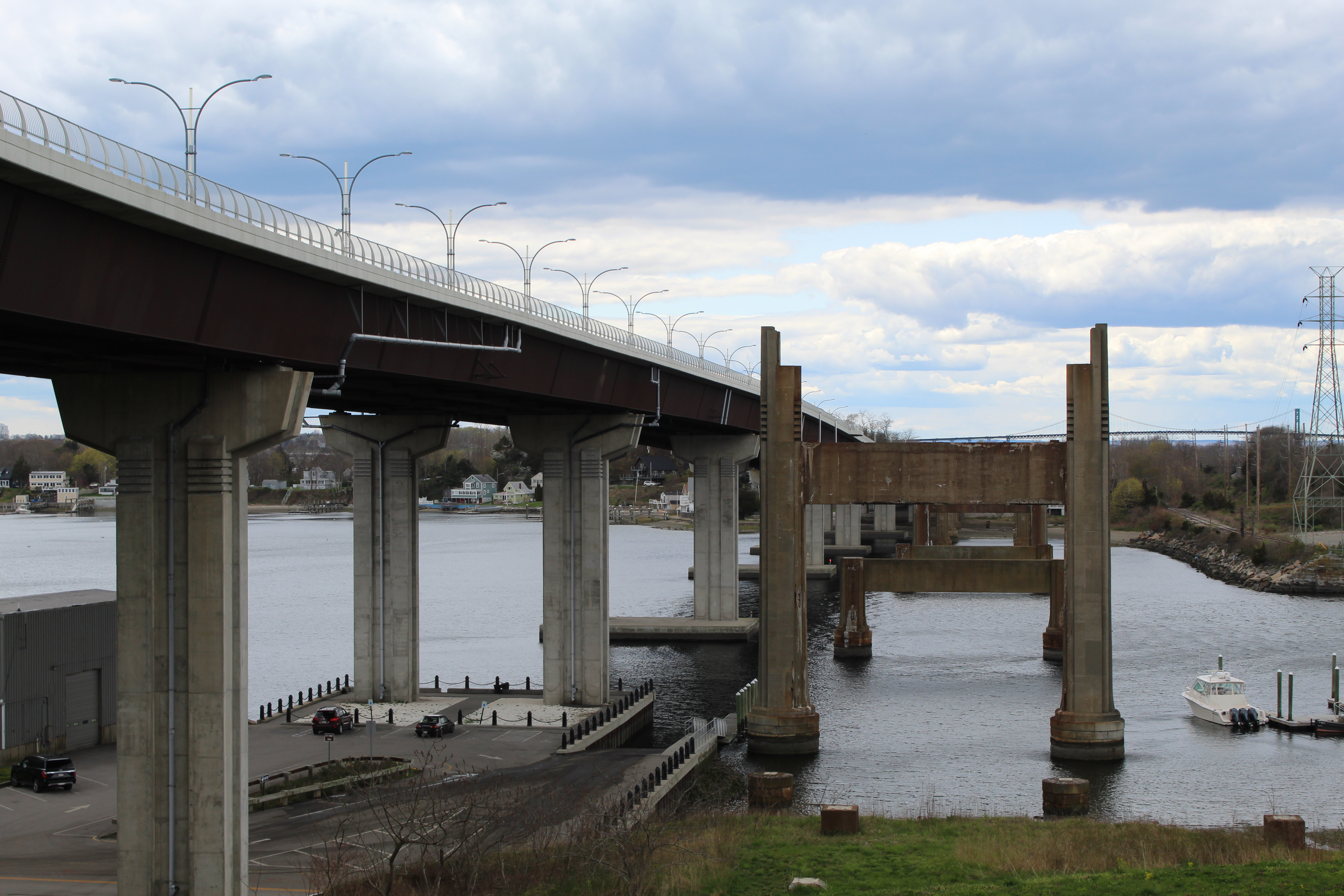
- The new Sakonnet River Bridge alongside the remaining sub-structure of the old bridge.
- Coordinates: 41.6381°N 71.2140°W
- Carries: Route 24 / Route 138
- Crosses: Sakonnet River
- Locale: between Portsmouth and Tiverton
- Official name: Staff Sergeant Christopher Potts Sakonnet River Bridge
- RIDOT Bridge Inventory Number: 025051

Characteristics
- Design: truss bridge (1957); Box girder bridge (2012)
- Total length: 2,982.5 feet (909.1 m)
- Width: 94.2 feet (28.7 m)
- Clearance above: 100 feet (30 m)

History
- Built: 1956
- Rebuilt: 2012

Statistics
- Daily traffic: 40,000
- Toll: Free

Location
- Location in Rhode Island

The Staff Sergeant Christopher Potts Sakonnet River Bridge, commonly referred to as the Sakonnet River Bridge, is a four-lane bridge spanning the Sakonnet River in eastern Rhode Island. The bridge carries RI 24 and RI 138 between the communities of Portsmouth and Tiverton, Rhode Island. The current bridge is a box girder bridge that opened in 2012 at a cost of US$120 million (equivalent to US$160,000,000 in 2024). The previous bridge was a truss bridge that was built in 1956 and demolished in 2012 due to severe structural deficiencies. The truss bridge had previously served as a replacement for the Stone Bridge, about 0.8 miles (1.3 km) to the south.

It became part of RI 24 during the 1960s after the completion of the Portsmouth and Tiverton Expressways. At one point, it was briefly considered for inclusion as part of the never-built Interstate 895. In October 2023, the Rhode Island Department of Transportation announced plans to remove the rest of the bridge, and have scheduled the project for 2026. The department started demolishing the bridge superstructure in 2018.

In 2025, the bridge was renamed to honor Staff Sergeant Christopher Potts, a Rhode Island National Guardsman who resided nearby and was killed in 2004 while deployed to Iraq during the war on terror.

== Tolls ==
In 2003, state officials declared that there would be no tolls on the bridge, but Governor Lincoln Chafee reversed this decision in 2012.

The new bridge was opened in August 2013, and the Rhode Island Turnpike and Bridge Authority began collecting a 10¢ toll from drivers with an E-ZPass transponder using an open road tolling gantry. Those without E-ZPass were expected to call the Authority's office to arrange payment. The toll was imposed in order to keep open the future possibility of higher tolls due to a quirk in federal law. The Rhode Island Turnpike and Bridge Authority collected a total of $677,570 from August 2013 to May 2014.

The toll was removed in June 2014, and the Rhode Island Department of Transportation stated in 2019 that they would not impose any tolls on the bridge in the future. After the toll was removed, opponents asked for a refund of the collected money, and that all tolling equipment be dismantled.
