= William Barton (soldier) =

Continental Army soldier

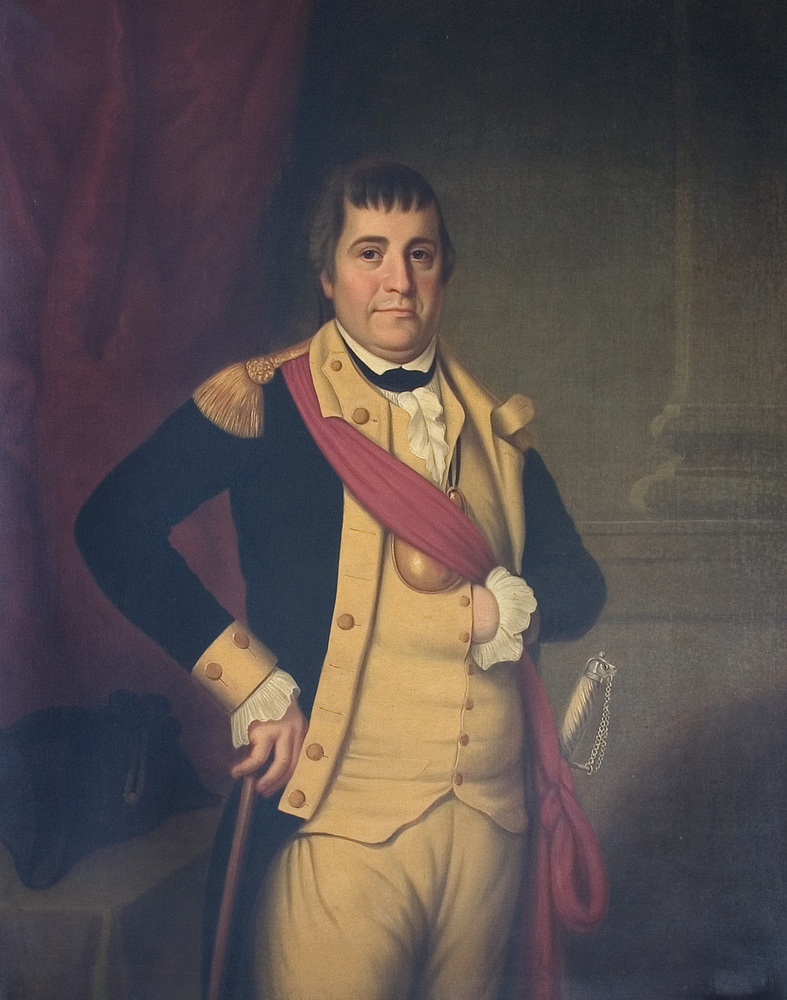
- William Barton, painted by James Sullivan Lincoln
- Born: May 26, 1748; Warren, Rhode Island
- Died: October 22, 1831 (aged 83)
- Spouse: Rhoda Carver
- Military career
- Allegiance: United States
- Branch: Continental Army
- Rank: Colonel
- Unit: Rhode Island Regiment
- Commands: Stanton's regiment
- Conflicts: Battle of Bunker Hill
- Awards: Society of the Cincinnati

William Barton (1748–1831) was an officer in the Continental Army during the American Revolutionary War who retired with the rank of colonel. He later served as adjutant general of the Rhode Island militia.

== Early years and enlistment ==
Barton was born in Warren, Rhode Island on May 26, 1748, and he worked as a hatter in Providence. In 1771, he married Rhoda Carver. In 1775, he enlisted in the Continental Army as a corporal.

== Revolutionary War service ==
On August 2, 1775, Barton was appointed the adjutant of Richmond's Rhode Island Regiment. He was promoted to captain on November 1, 1775. He planned and led a raid on British headquarters in June and July 1777, capturing Major General Richard Prescott. Barton crossed Narragansett Bay on the night of July 10–11 with 38 men and six officers in five whaleboats. They slipped past three British frigates, landing about halfway between Newport and Bristol Ferry; they then went to the farm house where Prescott had his headquarters. They surprised the guards, kicked through the door of Prescott's room, and captured Prescott. They carried him away half dressed and took him to Warwick Point, then to Providence. For this exploit, the Continental Congress gave Barton a sword and passed a resolution honoring his service.

Barton was promoted to lieutenant colonel on November 10, 1777; he was made colonel of the Rhode Island State Troops on December 1 upon the resignation of Colonel Joseph Stanton, Jr. On December 19, Barton was re-appointed as colonel of his regiment when the enlistments of its members expired. Soldiers were re-enlisted for a term expiring on March 16, 1779. The regiment was part of the Rhode Island State Troops, which was a brigade commanded by Brigadier General Ezekiel Cornell consisting of two regiments of infantry and one of artillery. In February 1778, Barton was commissioned in the Continental Army.

Barton was gravely wounded in the thigh while trying to rally American militia to attack the rear guard of a British raiding party that burned parts of Bristol and Warren on May 25, 1778. He never fully recovered from this injury, but did return in June 1779 to lead the "Corps of Light Infantry", which consisted of four companies of 54 men each and operated in boats patrolling Narragansett Bay. Barton served in this capacity until the end of the war.

== After the revolution ==
In 1783 Barton became an original member of the Rhode Island Society of the Cincinnati.

When Rhode Island ratified the United States Constitution in 1790, Barton was sent to New York to notify George Washington.

After the Revolution Barton was active in the state militia. He served as the brigadier general in command of the Providence County Brigade from May 1794 until he became major general in command of the Rhode Island Militia from May 1802 to May 1809.

He helped to found the town of Barton, Vermont. Subsequently, Barton was successfully sued in court for selling the same land to two different parties. He refused to pay this debt. For this he was ultimately confined to the debtors' prison in Danville for 14 years, starting at the age of sixty-four. At the age of seventy-seven, he was released at the initiative of the visiting Marquis de Lafayette, who agreed to pay the balance of his debt.

== Death and legacy ==
Barton died on October 22, 1831, at the age of eighty-three. He is buried in the North Burial Ground in Providence, Rhode Island.

Fort Barton in Rhode Island was named after William Barton. It is now a park owned by the town of Tiverton, Rhode Island.

Near Fort Barton—off of Lawton Avenue—is Fort Barton Elementary School, one of Tiverton's three elementary schools.

== Honors ==
The American Heraldry Society offers the William Barton Scholarship in an amount up to $1,500 to "support both undergraduate and graduate students in the preparation and completion of a thesis, dissertation, or equivalent degree capstone project relevant to the use of heraldry and its auxiliary sciences (coats of arms, seals, heraldic badges, heraldic paleography, vexillology, as well as genealogy where it intersects with heraldry)"

== External references ==
- McBurney, Christian. Kidnapping the Enemy: The Special Operations to Capture Generals Charles Lee and Richard Prescott. Yardley, PA: Westholme Publishing, 2014. ISBN 978-1-59416-183-4. This book has as one of its main focuses Barton's capture of General Prescott and Barton's life after the war, including the story of his spending 14 years in a Vermont debtors' prison.
- Boatner, Mark Mayo, III. Encyclopedia of the American Revolution. Revised ed. New York: McKay, 1974. ISBN 0-8117-0578-1.
- Falkner, Leonard. "Captor of the Barefoot General". American Heritage Magazine 11:5 (August 1960).
- Heitman, Francis B. Historical Register of Officers of the Continental Army during the War of the Revolution. New, enlarged, and revised edition. Washington, D.C.: Rare Book Shop Publishing Company, 1914. Available on Google Book Search, page 90 shows Barton's service record and dates of promotions.
- McBurney, Christian. The Rhode Island Campaign: The First French and American Operation of the Revolutionary War. Yardley, PA: Westholme, Publishing, 2011. ISBN 978-1-59416-134-6.
