= Osborn–Bennett Historic District =

Historic district in Rhode Island, United States

- U.S. National Register of Historic Places
- U.S. Historic district
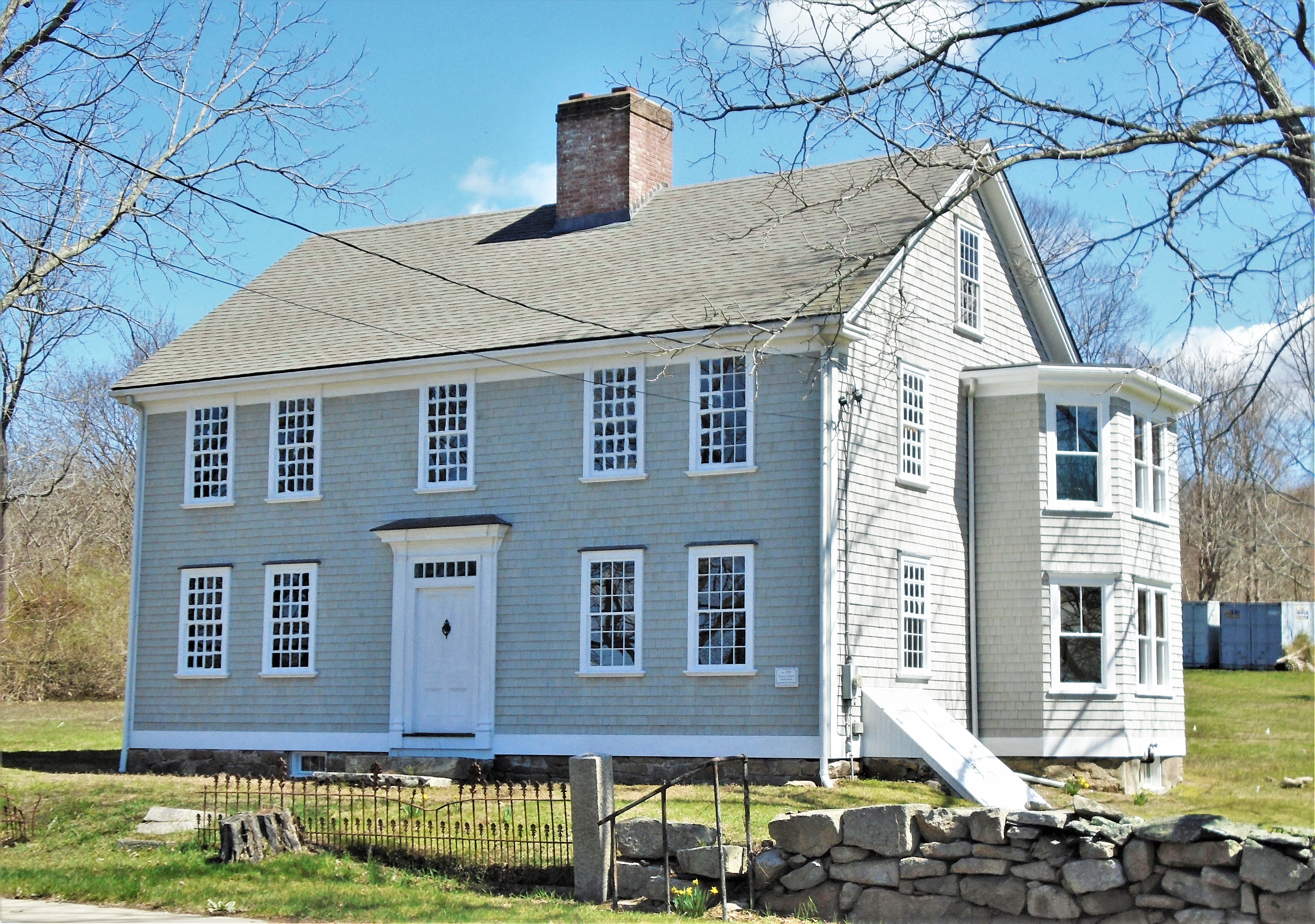
- Thomas Osborn Homestead (2021)

- Location within Rhode Island Location within the United States
- Location: Tiverton, Rhode Island
- Coordinates: 41°38′35″N 71°11′55″W
- Area: 27 acres (11 ha)
- Architectural style: multiple
- NRHP reference No.: 05001460
- Added to NRHP: December 22, 2005

The Osborn–Bennett Historic District is a residential historic district in Tiverton, Rhode Island consisting of four houses. The district was added to the National Register of Historic Places in 2006.

== History and description ==
The district was formed around Main Road which was laid out in 1683 by the first English settlers in the area. The Osborn family settled there in the 18th century and distinguished themselves as businessmen and attorneys. The Osborn family cemetery is within the district as well as several Italianate houses. The district extends along Main Road north of its junction with Rhode Island Route 24, and includes three houses on the west side of the road (1148, 1168, and 1188) and one on the east side (1137).

The houses are:

- The Edward Bennett/James Otis Hambly House at 1137 Main Road, is a small-style Federal house built c.1822. The house's ell may not be original, but is certain to have existed by 1895. The roof was replaced some time after 1936. There is also a 1 1/2 story barn to the south of the house.
- The Osborn House at 1148 Main Road, across the street from the Bennett-Hambly House, was built c.1845 in the Italianate style. Its ell dates from some time before 1895. A number of farm outbuildings still exist on the lot which surrounds the house of three sides and which was once part of the Osborn farm. These include a small barn, the ruins of another barn, a garage, a shed, and an unspecified outbuilding. The house remained in the hands of the Osborn family until the mid to late 20th century.
- The Thomas Osborn Homestead at 1168 Main Road dates from c.1790. It is a two-story Federal style house on extensive property with includes wooded areas and open fields. The ell may be original to the building, but was in place by 1895. Outbuildings include a barn and a shed, and the Osborn family cemetery is also on the property. The earliest marked grave is Thomas Osborn's from 1833, and the latest from 1972. Thomas Osborn was the first white settler in the area. The house has been owned by a member of the Osborn family since its construction to at least 2005.
- The Judge Joseph Osborn House at 1188 Main Road is an Italianate house built around 1845. It originally included an ell, which has since been removed by 1953. The property includes a large barn/garage with two shed attached. Like the Osborn House, the Judge Joseph Osborn House remained in the hands of the Osborn family until the mid to late 20th century. The judge is said to have been "perhaps [the] most distinguished member" of the Osborn family.

== Gallery ==
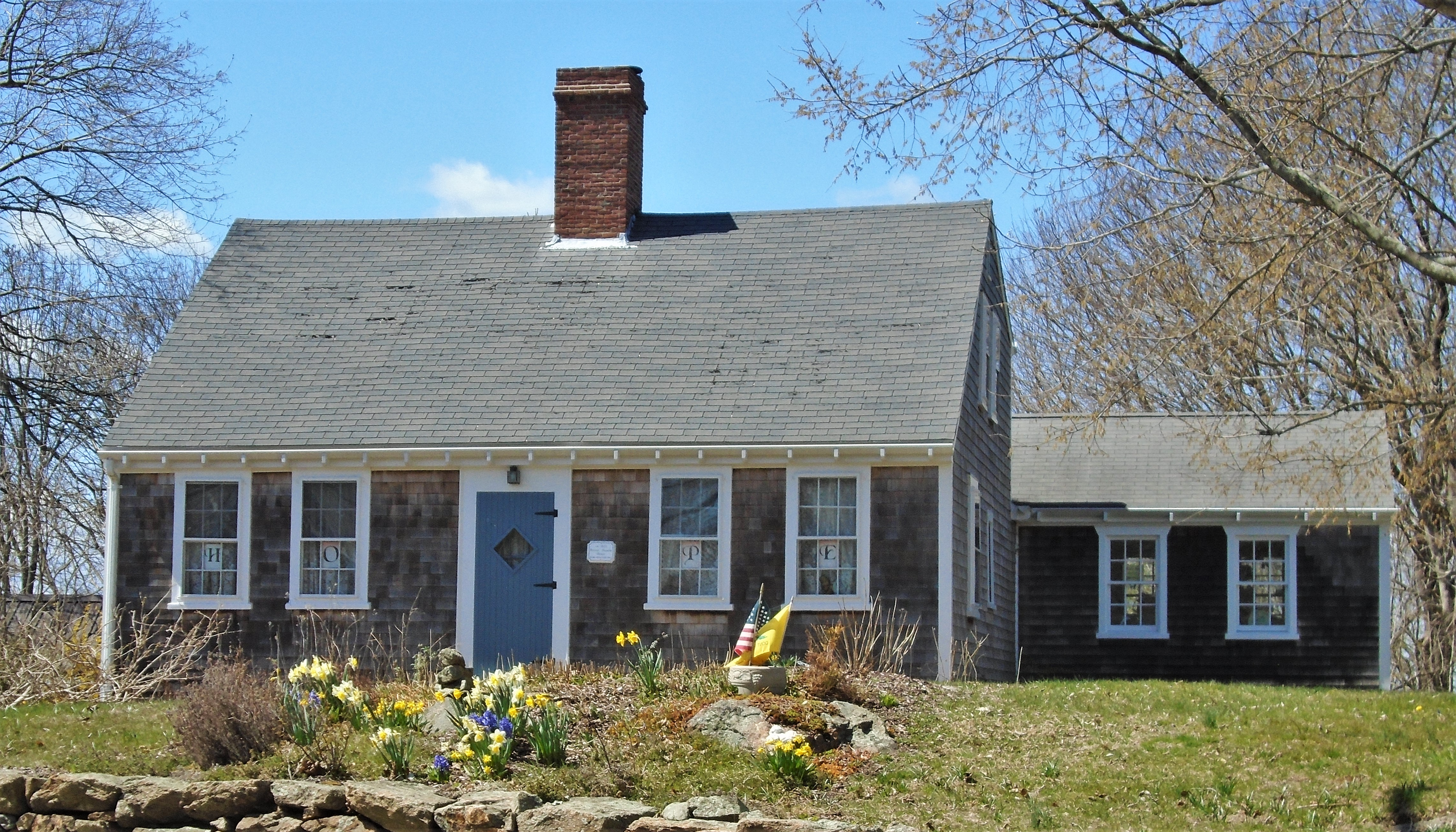
The Edward Bennett/James Otis Holmby House

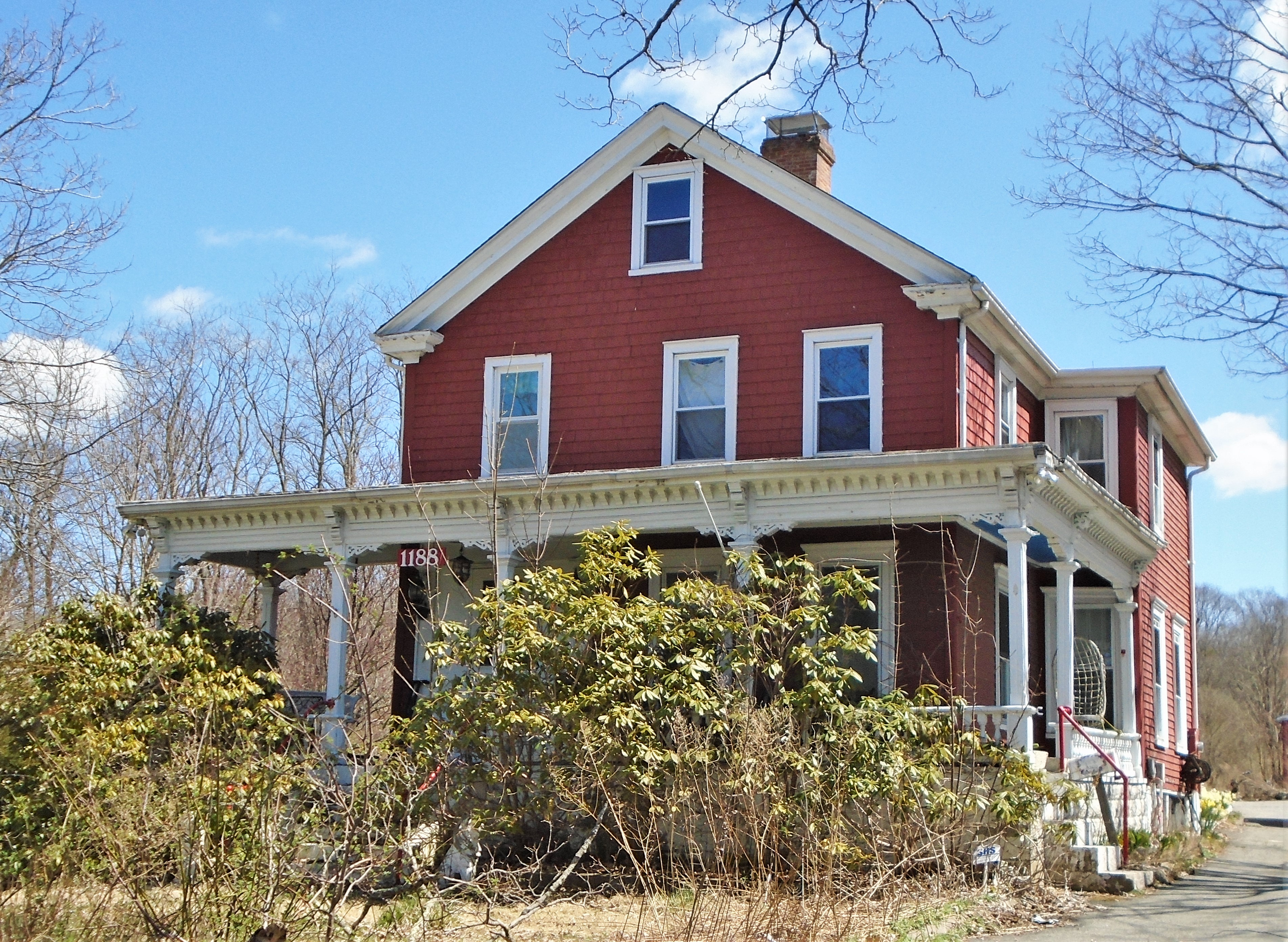
The Judge Joseph Osborn House

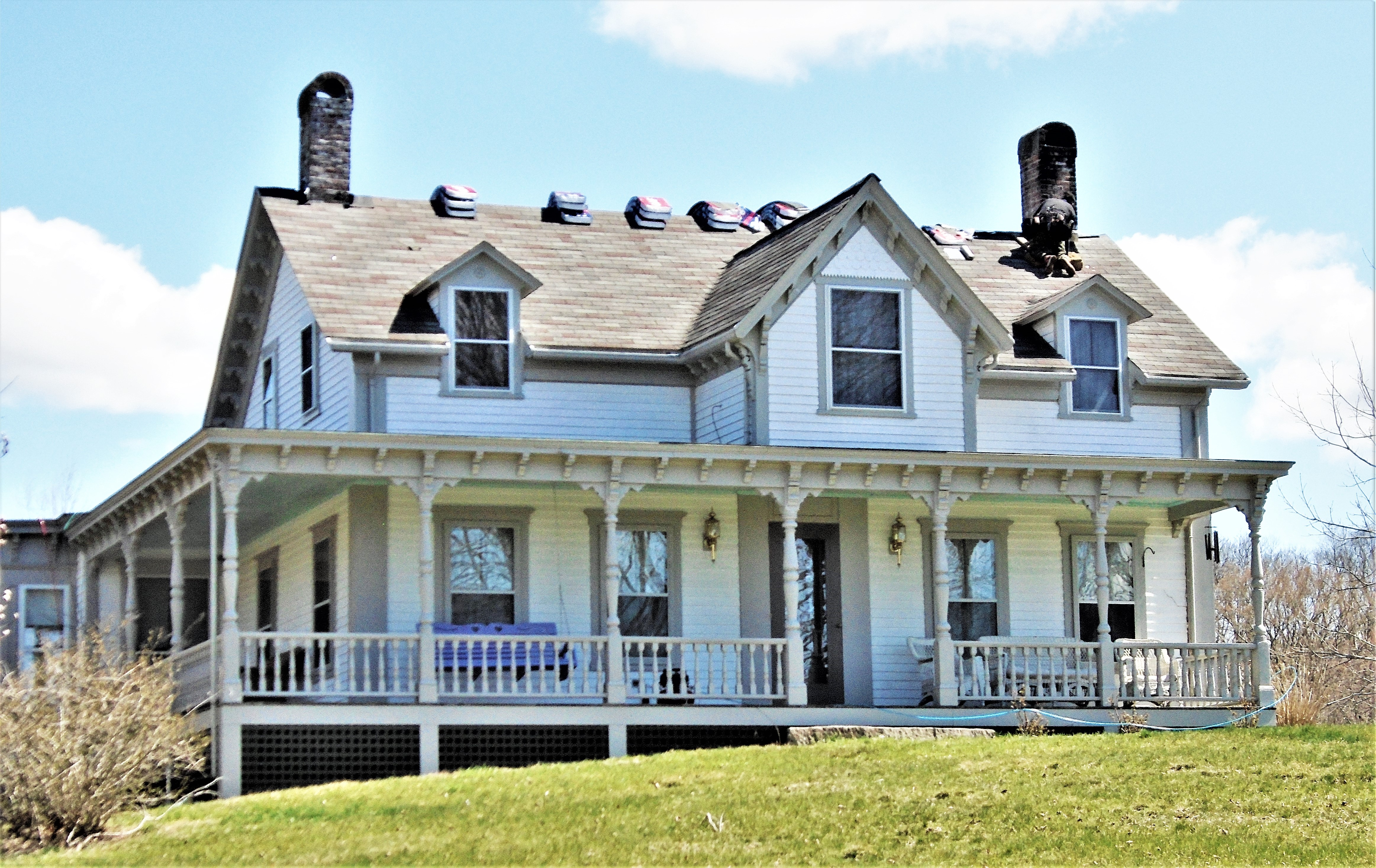
The Osborn House

== See also ==
- National Register of Historic Places listings in Newport County, Rhode Island
