= Cook–Bateman Farm =

- U.S. National Register of Historic Places
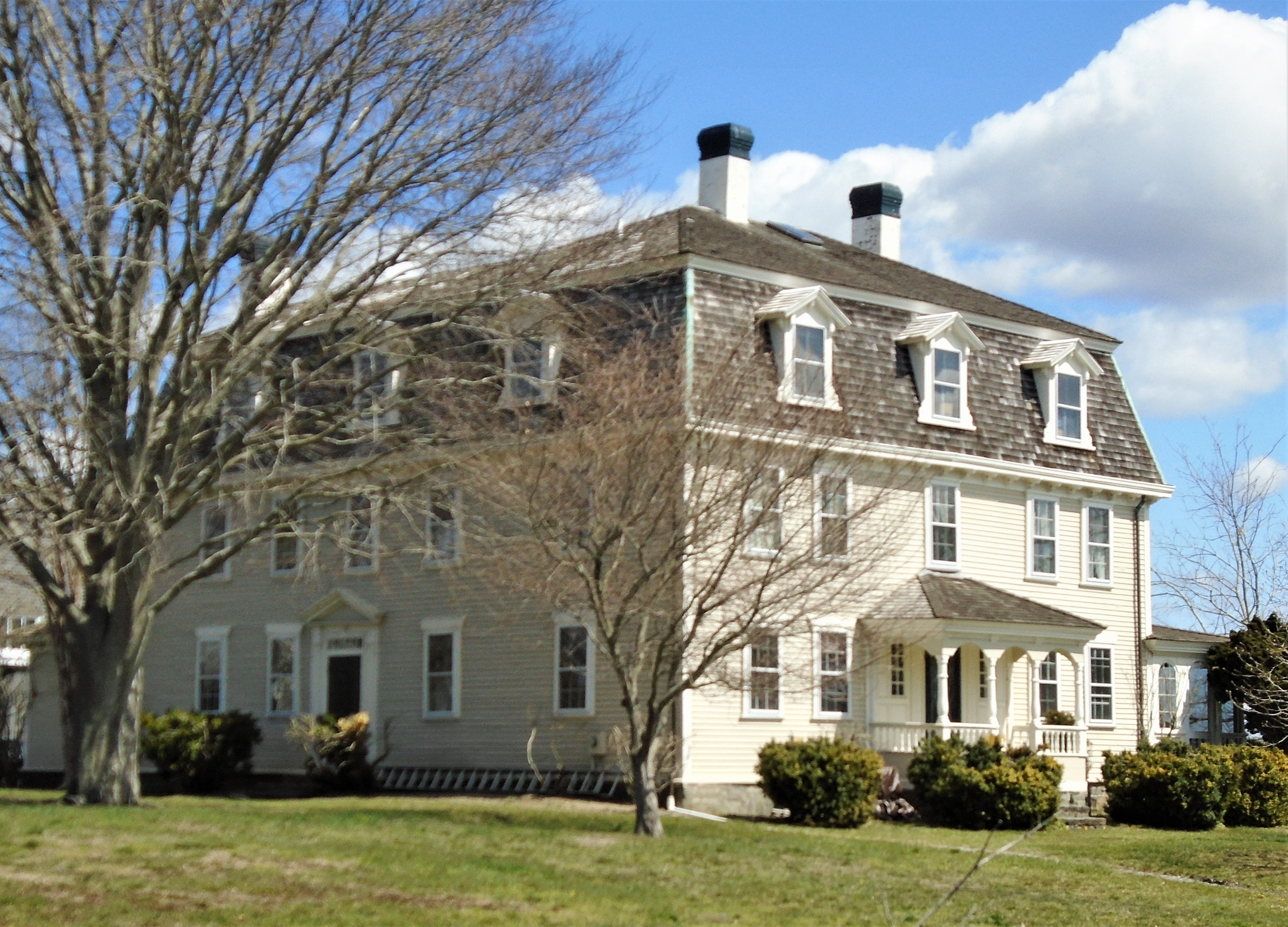
- (2021)

- Location within Rhode Island Location within the United States
- Location: Tiverton, Rhode Island
- Coordinates: 41.5545°N 71.2043°W
- Area: 63 acres (25 ha)
- Built: 1730
- NRHP reference No.: 79003775
- Added to NRHP: October 11, 1979

The Cook–Bateman Farm is a colonial-era farmstead located at the intersection of Fogland, Puncatest Neck (or Neck) and Pond Bridge Roads in Tiverton, Rhode Island. The property was initially purchased in 1700 and reached its largest size, 200 acres (81 ha), in the last 25 years of the 18th century. It currently encompasses 63 acres (25 ha) of rolling farmland.

The focal point of the farmstead is the 2 1/2-story house, the oldest portion of which dates to c.1730–48, while the north kitchen was constructed or rebuilt c.1812-20. Both are now covered by the Second Empire high mansard rook, which was added c.1870. Also on the property is a gambrel-roofed frame barn dating from the late 19th or early 20th century; a two-story hip-roofed frame structure which might be the oldest building in the farmstead, possibly a heabily-altered original farm building from c.1700; a "farmers house"; and a number of other smaller outbuildings.

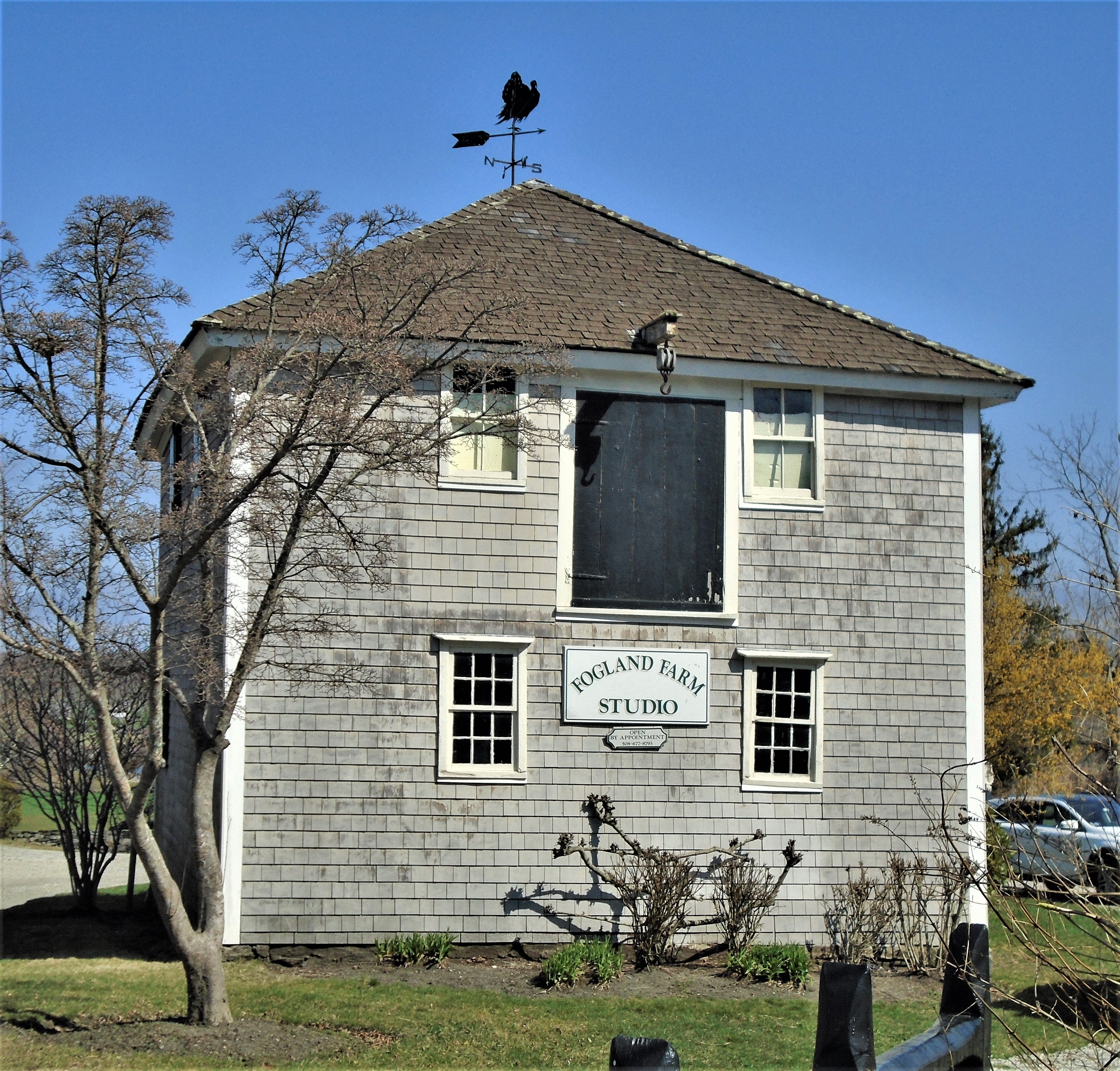
An outbuilding which may be a heavily-altered original farm building, c.1700

The property, which has evidence of earlier Native American occupation, including arrowheads and stone tools found in the fields, was purchased by John Cook in 1700, and remained in the hands of just two families for more than 200 years, until 1977.

The farm was listed on the National Register of Historic Places in 1979.

== See also ==
- National Register of Historic Places listings in Newport County, Rhode Island
