= Bourne Mill (Tiverton, Rhode Island) =

- U.S. National Register of Historic Places
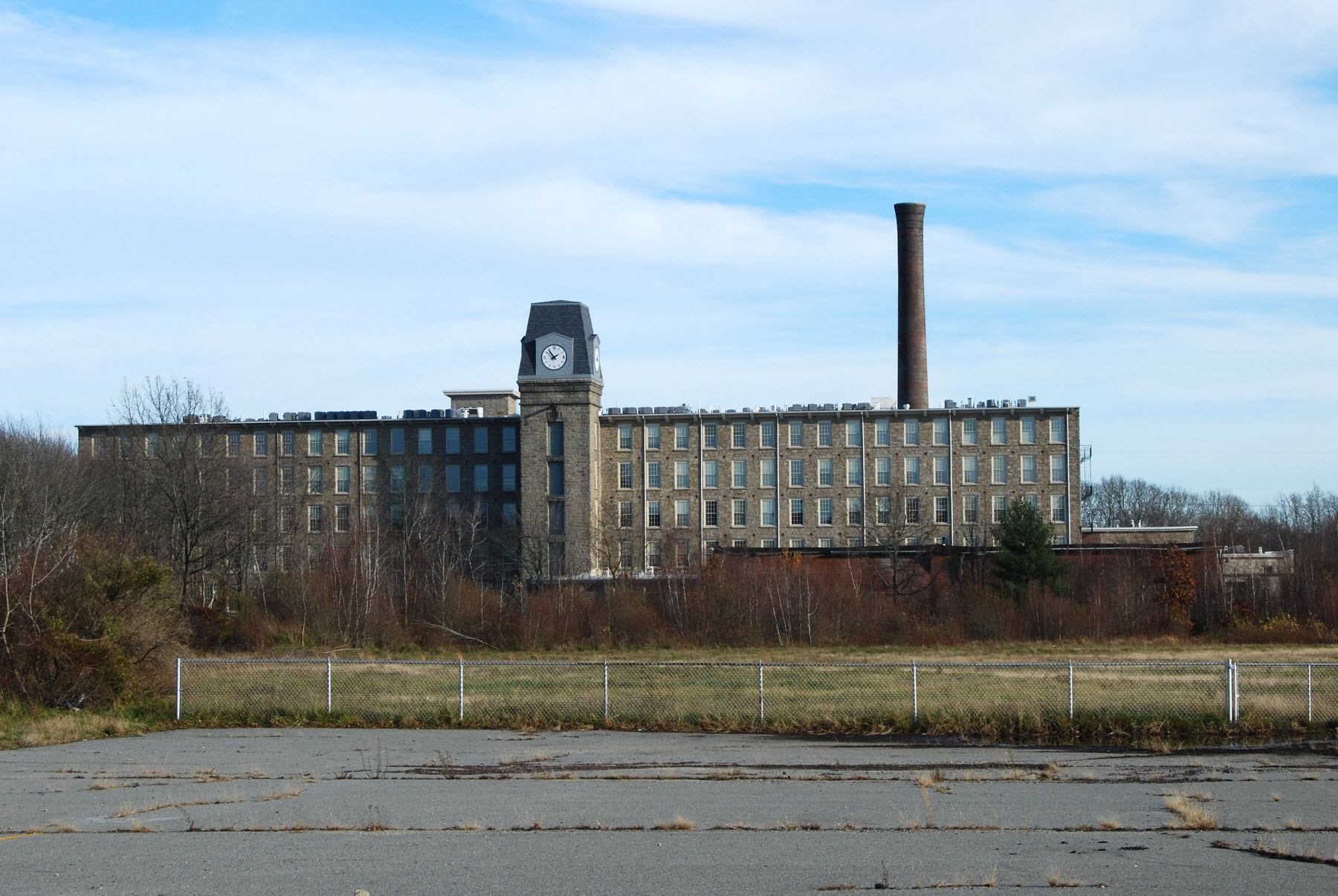

- Location within Rhode Island Location within the United States
- Location: Tiverton, Rhode Island and Fall River, Massachusetts
- Coordinates: 41°40′12″N 71°10′41″W
- Built: 1881
- Architect: George A. Chace, Frank Sheldon
- NRHP reference No.: 06001189
- Added to NRHP: December 22, 2006

The Bourne Mill is an historic textile mill on the border between Tiverton, Rhode Island and Fall River, Massachusetts.

The various buildings in the cotton mill complex were completed from 1881 to 1951 and added to the National Register of Historic Places in 2006. The Bourne corporation had a unique profit sharing arrangement based upon Jonathan Bourne's experience in the whaling industry. The company treasurer, George A. Chace, designed the original mill building.

Although only a very small part of the property is located in Fall River, Massachusetts the complex is generally grouped and referenced with the mills of that city.

After lying dormant for decades, the Bourne Mill was converted into 166 apartments, which were completed in early 2009. In September 2009, an arsonist set fire to the former detached picker house near the main mill, which had also been scheduled to be redeveloped.

== See also ==
- List of mills in Fall River, Massachusetts
- National Register of Historic Places listings in Newport County, Rhode Island
