= First Baptist Church (Tiverton, Rhode Island) =

Historic church in Rhode Island, United States

- First Baptist Church of Tiverton
- U.S. National Register of Historic Places
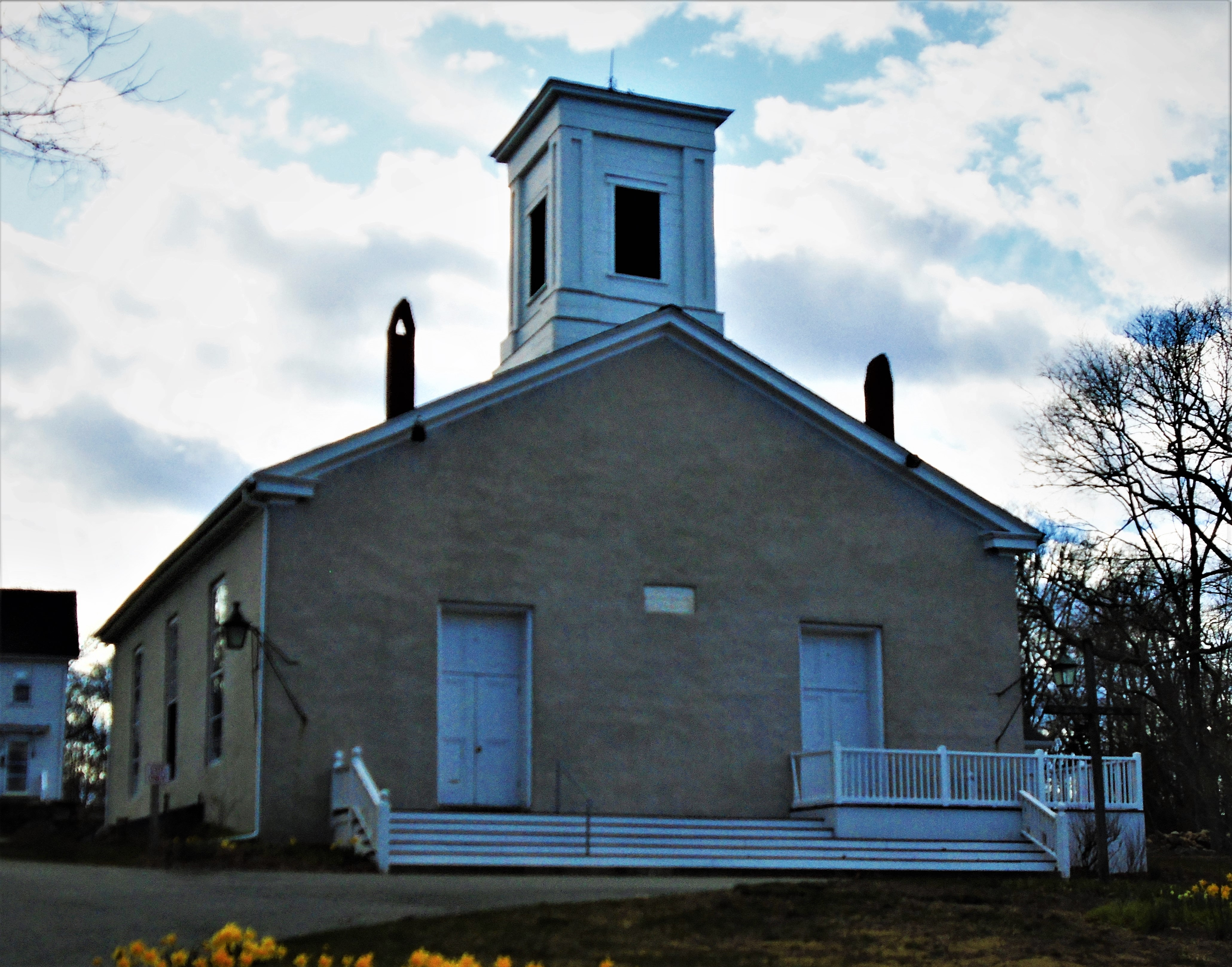
- (2021)

- Location within Rhode Island Location within the United States
- Location: 7 Old Stone Church Road, Tiverton, Rhode Island
- Coordinates: 41°33′42″N 71°08′34″W
- Area: less than 38 acres (15 ha)
- NRHP reference No.: 13000569
- Added to NRHP: July 30, 2013

The First Baptist Church of Tiverton, commonly called the Old Stone Church, is a historic church property at 7 Old Stone Church Road in Tiverton, Rhode Island. The property consists of a cluster of buildings, including a church, parsonage, and parish house, along with a cemetery, on a largely wooded parcel of 38 acres (15 ha). The timber-framed field stone church building was built in 1841, the parsonage in 1885, and the parish house c.1879. The oldest documented cemetery burials are from the mid-19th century. Portions of the property are lined by period stone walls, including some that delineate former fields (now wooded) that would have been farmed by the minister. The church was built by a congregation whose roots date to 1680, making it one of the oldest Baptist congregations in the United States.

The church was added to the National Register of Historic Places in 2013.

== History ==
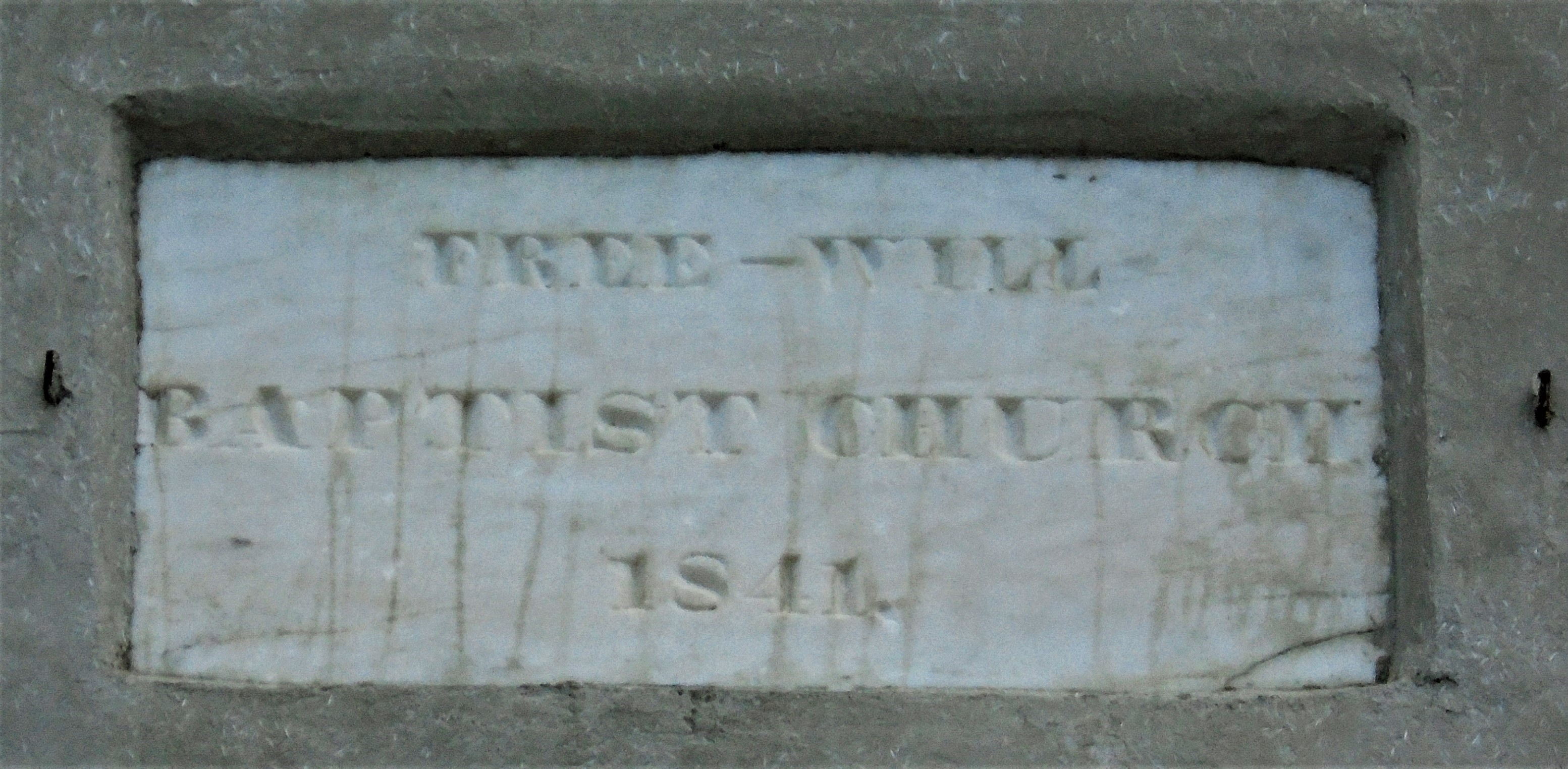
Marble plaque on the church's facade showing it was initially called the "Free-Will Baptist Church".

The congregation of the First Baptist Church dates from about 1680 when it was established in what was then called Dartmouth by John Cooke, who came to America on the Mayflower, and was ex-communicated from the Plymouth Congregationalist Church in 1657. At the time, it was illegal to practice as a Baptist in Massachusetts Bay Colony – which Dartmouth (Tiverton) was part of – so services were held in people's homes. In 1752, Tiverton and nearby Little Compton were separated from Massachusetts and given to Rhode Island, and Colonel Job Almy granted 35 acres of land to the Baptist congregation, on which a simple wood structure was built for worship.

Because of the need for more room, this was torn down and replaced in 1841 by a timber-framed field stone structure, which is the church that still stands today. A plaque on the church indicates that at the time it was built, it was called the "Free-Will Baptist Church". A parsonage was built in 1885, and a parish house c.1879.

The church was famous throughout the state for its clambakes, which began in 1864. Some 4,000 people attended the event in 1875. The church also began to host an auction and bazaar, sometimes featuring livestock, demonstrations and an antique auction, in the 1940s.

== See also ==
- National Register of Historic Places listings in Newport County, Rhode Island
