= Tiverton Four Corners Historic District =

Historic district in Rhode Island, United States

- U.S. National Register of Historic Places
- U.S. Historic district
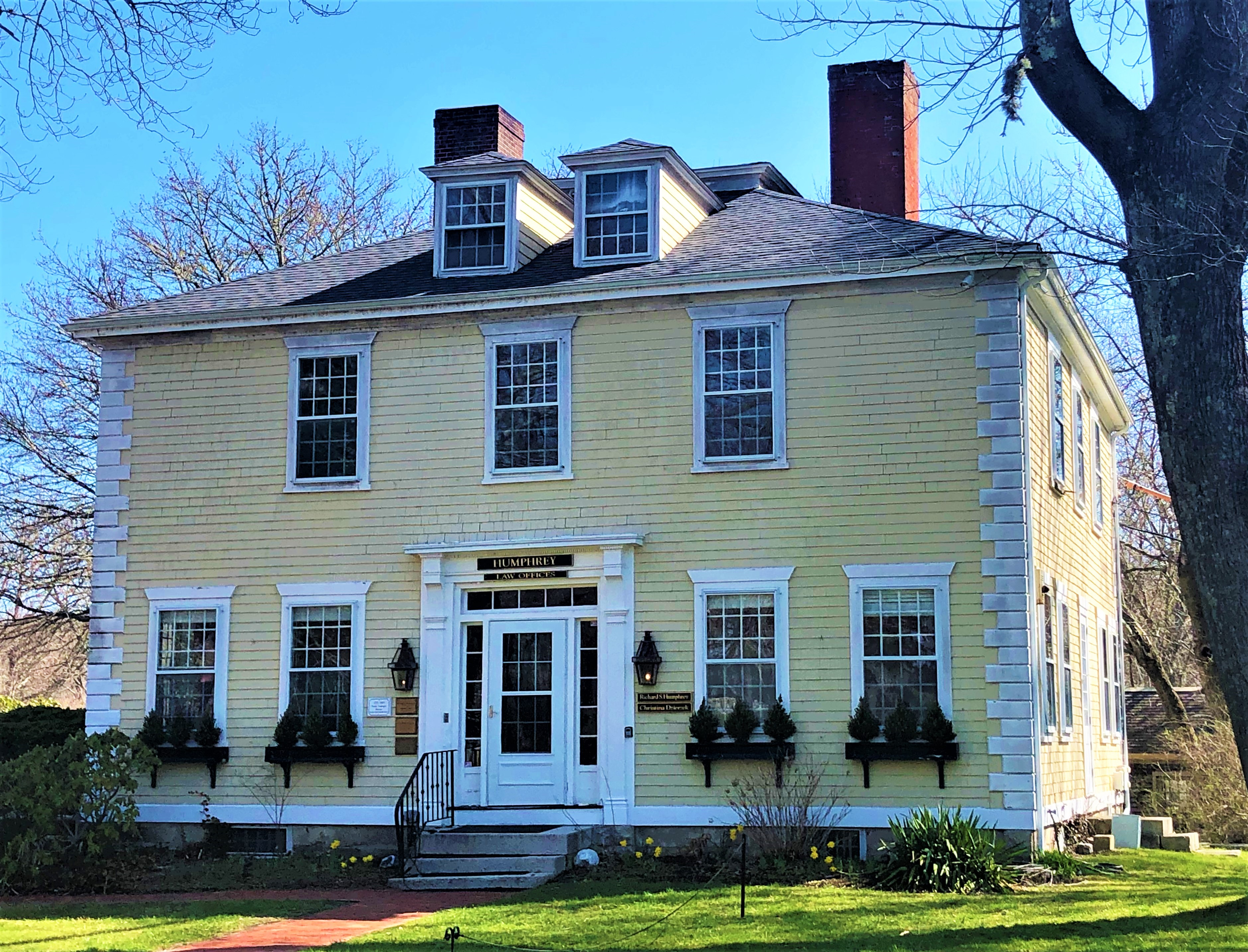
- The Soule-Seabury Mansion (1809)

- Location within Rhode Island Location within the United States
- Location: Tiverton, Rhode Island
- Coordinates: 41°34′17″N 71°11′18″W
- Area: 50 acres (20 ha)
- Architectural style: Colonial; Greek Revival; Victorian
- NRHP reference No.: 74000042
- Added to NRHP: 1974

Tiverton Four Corners Historic District encompasses a touristic village center and commercial area in Tiverton, Rhode Island, United States. The district extends along Main Road north and south from its junction with East Road and Puncatest Neck Road, or West Road. The 50-acre (20 ha) area consists of sixteen historic buildings, predominantly 18th and early 19th-century houses, as well as the 1868 Union Public Library, mill-related resources at the Mill Pond which was situated just southeast of the main intersection, and the A. P. White Store.

Originally inhabited by the Pocasset tribe, John Clarke and William Coddington – who in 1637 had purchased Aquidneck Island across the Sakonnet River from present-day Tiverton from the Narragansett tribe – also obtained from the Wampanoags use of land on the eastern side of the water. Land grants were made by Plymouth Colony as early as 1659, but formal development of the area did not begin until around 1679. After Plymouth Colony was absorbed by Massachusetts, the freemen of the area agitated for separation from it and to be joined to the Colony of Rhode Island. The dispute was not settled until 1746.

The district was added to the National Register of Historic Places in 1974.

== Gallery ==
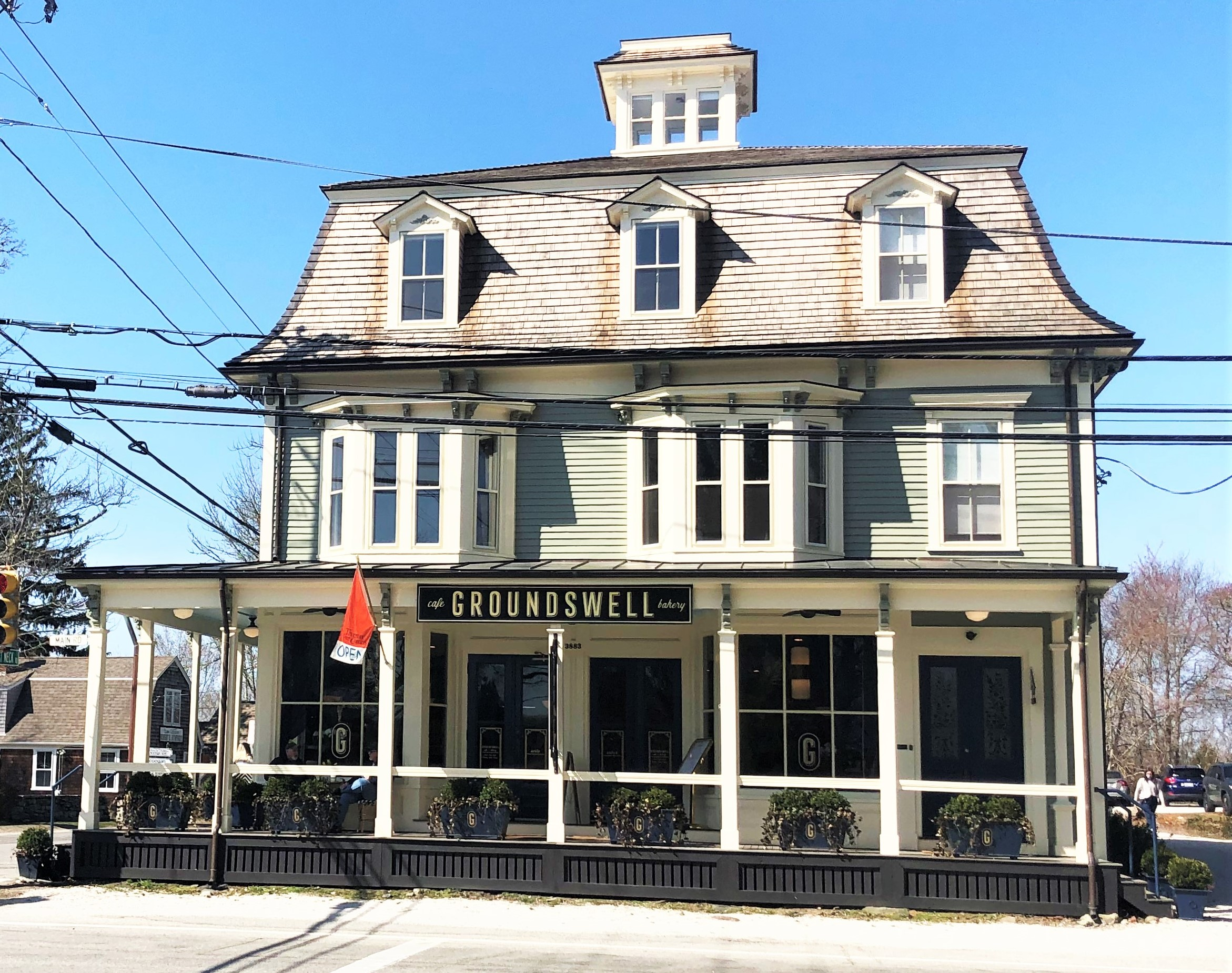
The A. P. White Store (1875)

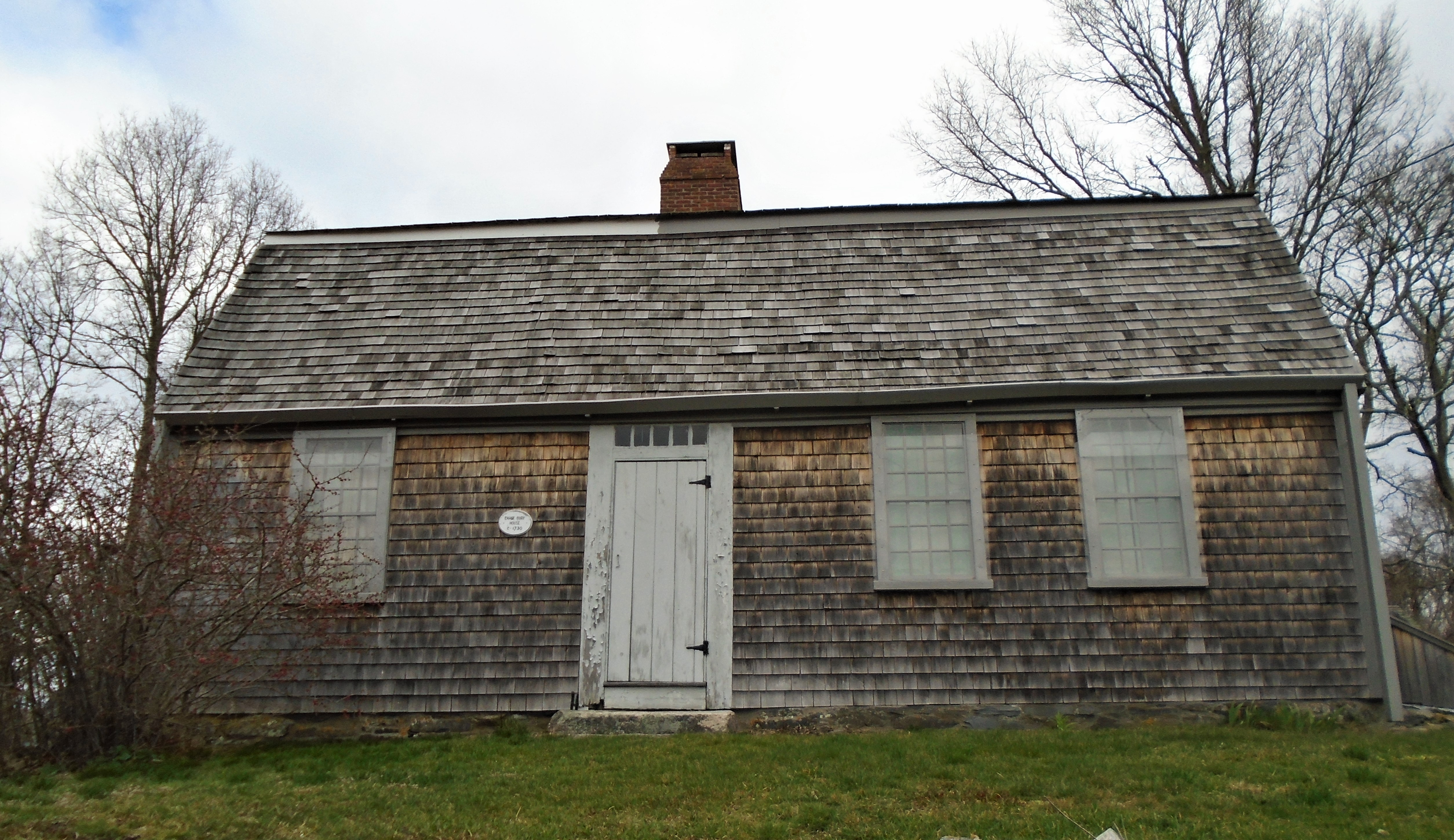
The Chace-Cory House (c.1730)

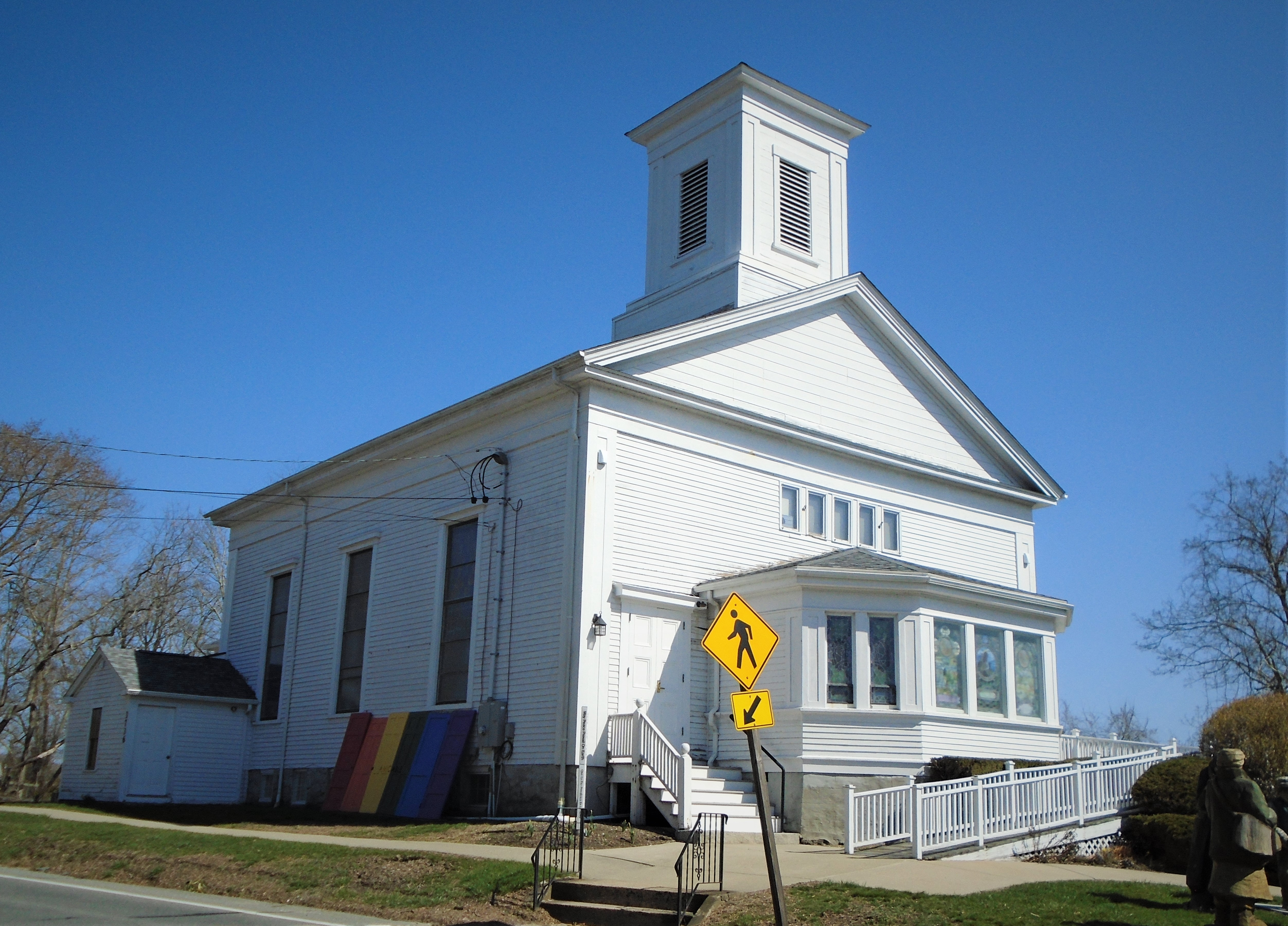
The Amicable Congregational Church (1811, rebuilt 1846)

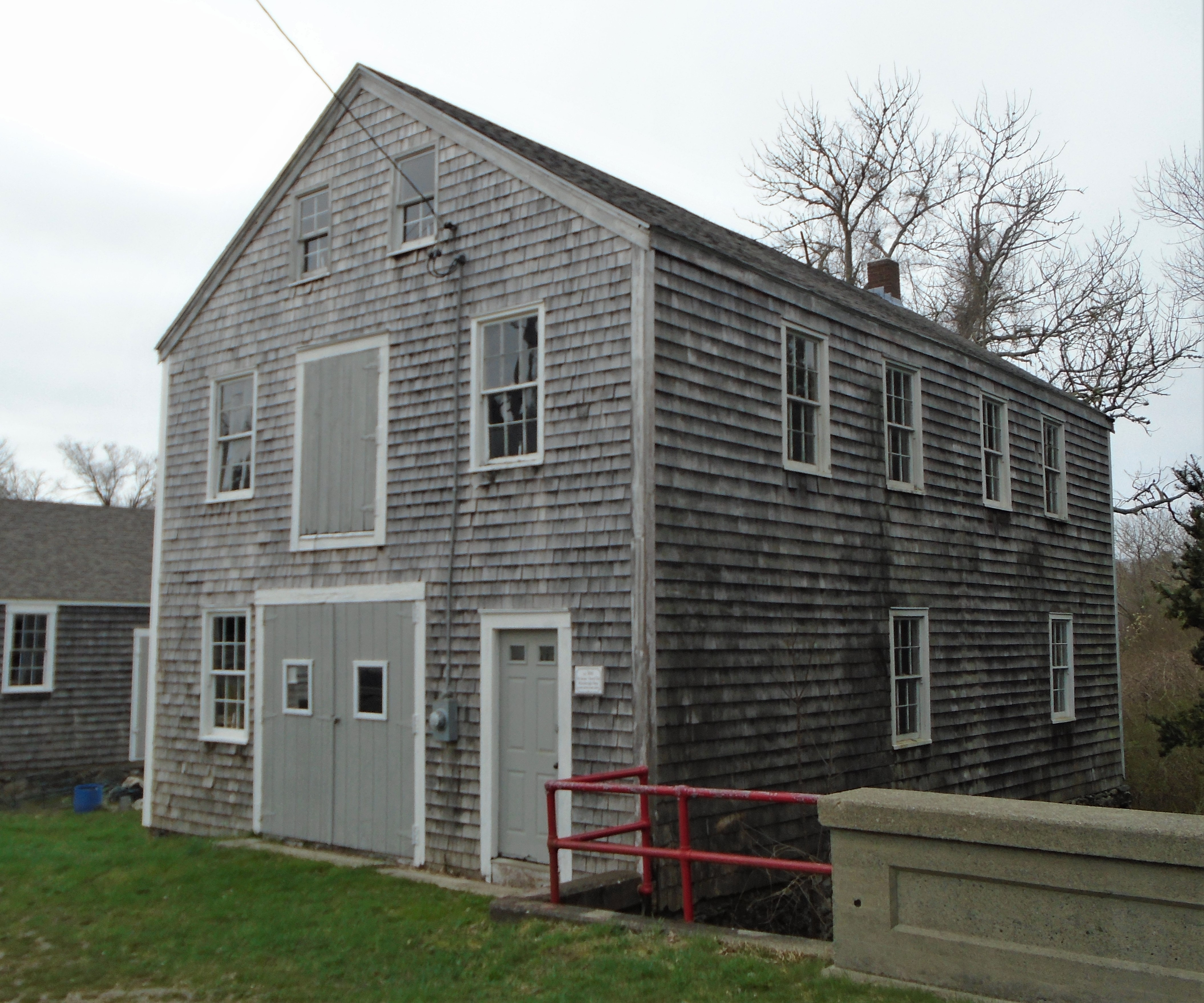
The Wm. Bateman - Preserved Tripp Wheelwright Shop (1800)

== See also ==
- National Register of Historic Places listings in Newport County, Rhode Island
