= Fort Barton Site =

- U.S. National Register of Historic Places
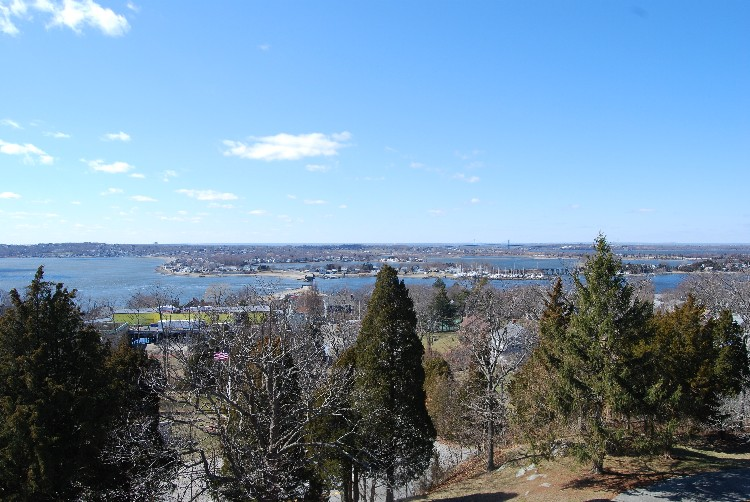
- Location: Lawton and Highland Aves. Tiverton, Rhode Island
- Coordinates: 41.6253°N 71.2070°W
- NRHP reference No.: 73000056
- Added to NRHP: March 7, 1973

The Fort Barton Site is the site of an historic American Revolutionary War fort, now located in a public park at Lawton and Highland Avenues in Tiverton, Rhode Island, United States. All that remains of the fort are its earthworks, a roughly oblong structure about 150 feet (46 m) long and 100 feet (30 m) deep. The site was a defensive post overlooking the main ferry crossing between Tiverton and Aquidneck Island, which was under British control at the time of its construction in 1777. The ferry was used as a launching position for American forces during the Battle of Rhode Island in August 1778. The site was named after Lt. Col. William Barton who successfully captured the British General Prescott during a midnight raid on the British headquarters at Prescott Farm in what is now Portsmouth.

Fort Barton was added to the National Register of Historic Places in 1973.

== See also ==
- National Register of Historic Places listings in Newport County, Rhode Island
