= Tiverton, Rhode Island =

- Town
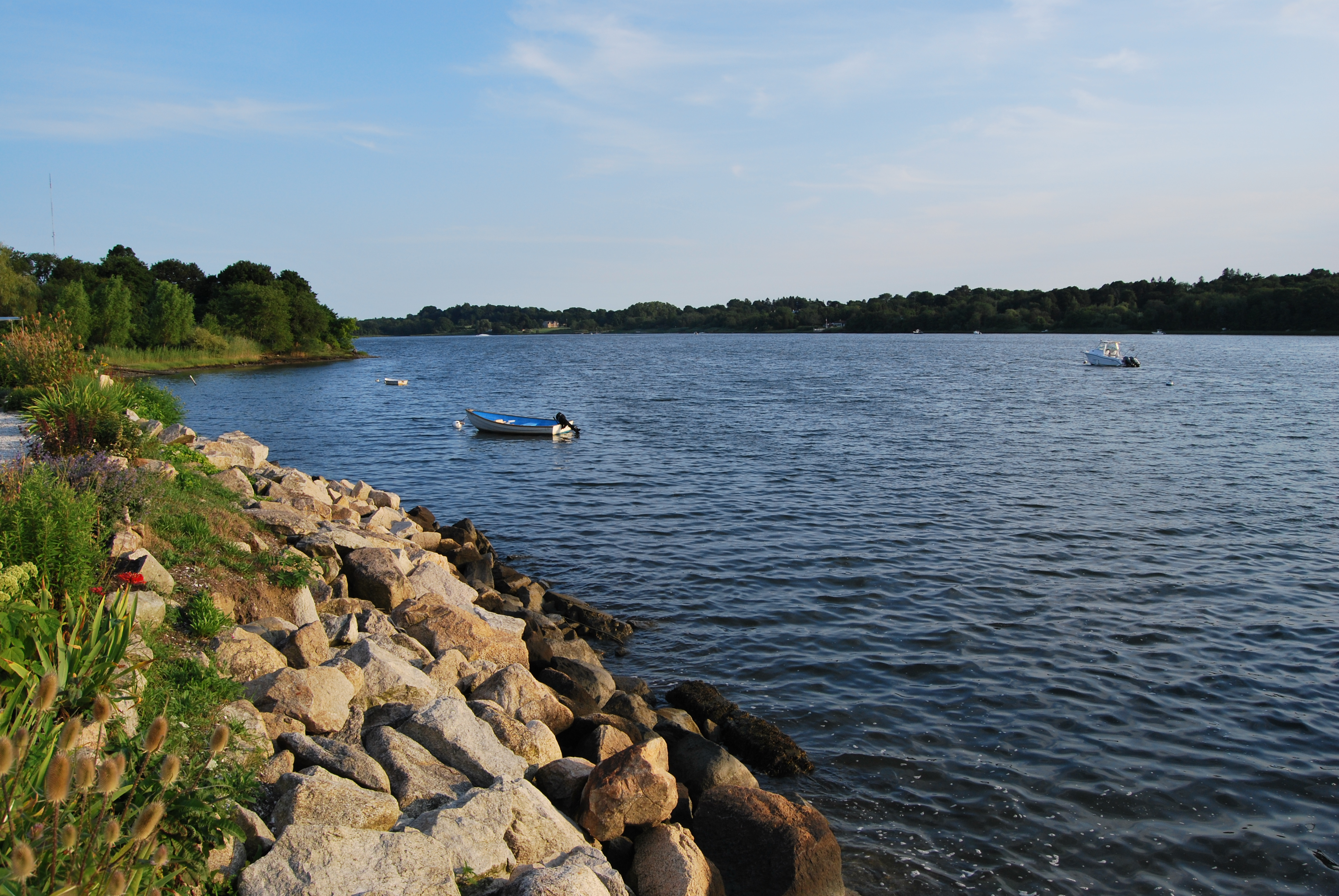
- Nanaquaket Pond, Tiverton, RI

- Seal

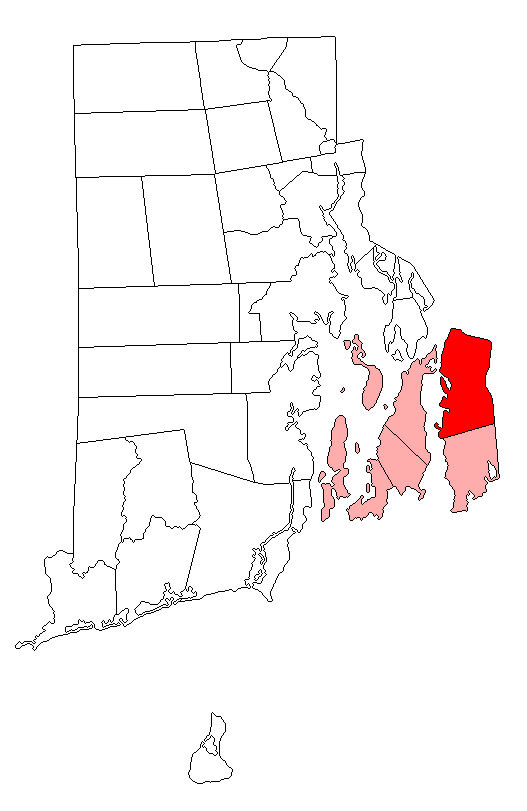
- Location of Tiverton in Newport County, Rhode Island
- Coordinates: 41°37′35″N 71°12′40″W
- Country: United States
- State: Rhode Island
- County: Newport
- Settled: 1659
- Incorporated (Massachusetts): June 14, 1694
- Annexed by Rhode Island: January 27, 1747

Area
  - Total: 36.3 sq mi (94.1 km^{2})
  - Land: 29.3 sq mi (76.0 km^{2})
  - Water: 6.9 sq mi (18.0 km^{2})
- Elevation: 167 ft (51 m)

Population (2020)
  - Total: 16,359
  - Density: 558/sq mi (215.3/km^{2})
- Time zone: UTC−5 (Eastern (EST))
  - Summer (DST): UTC−4 (EDT)
- ZIP Code: 02878
- Area code: 401
- FIPS code: 44-70880
- GNIS feature ID: 1220066
- Website: www.tiverton.ri.gov

Tiverton is a town in Newport County, Rhode Island, United States. The population was 16,359 at the 2020 census.

== History ==
=== Early ===
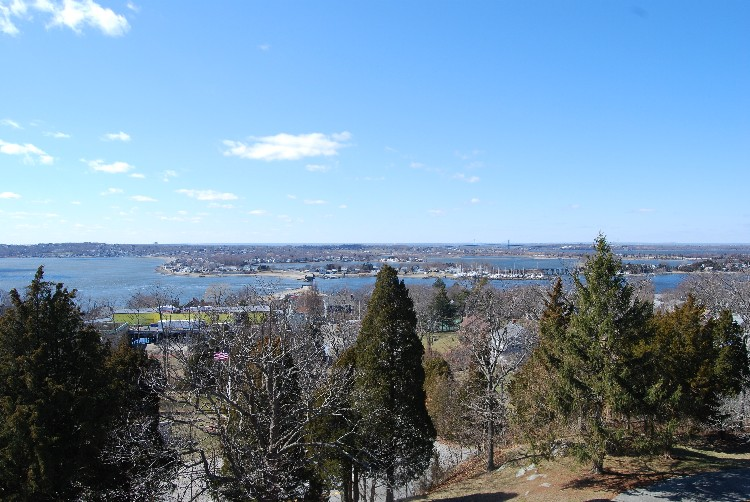
Tiverton from Fort Barton

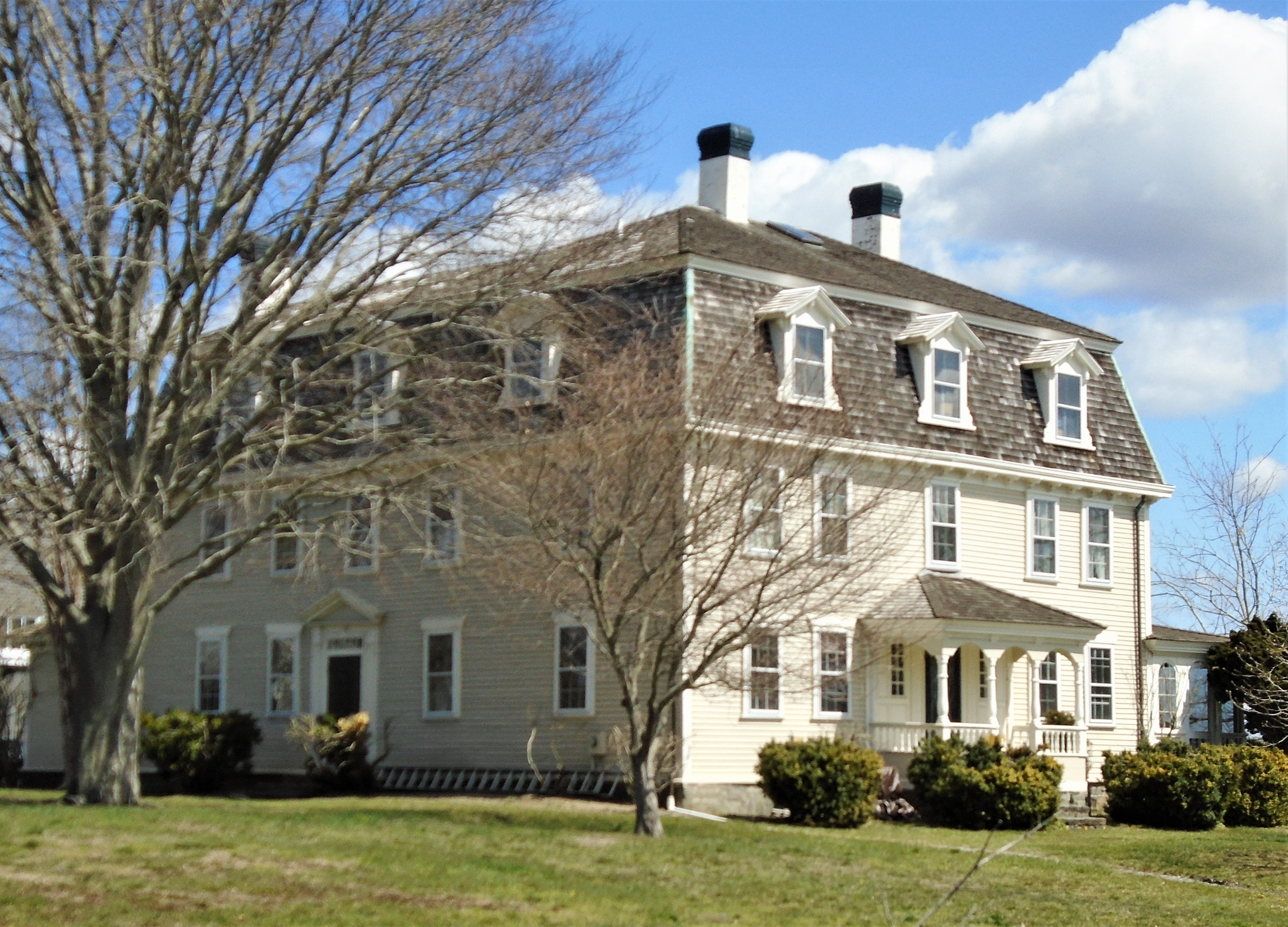
The main house of the Cook-Bateman Farm

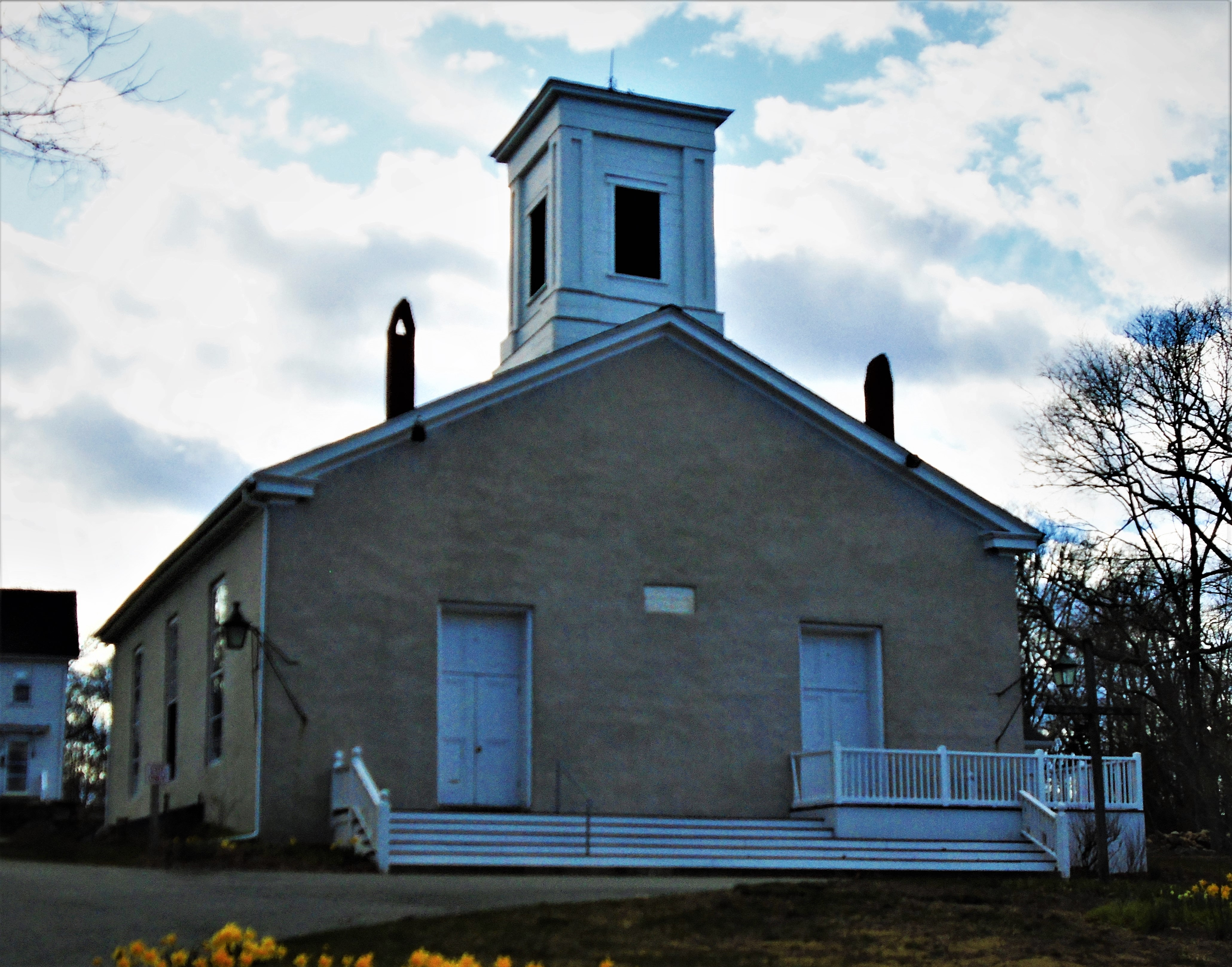
The First Baptist Church, known as the "Old Stone Church"

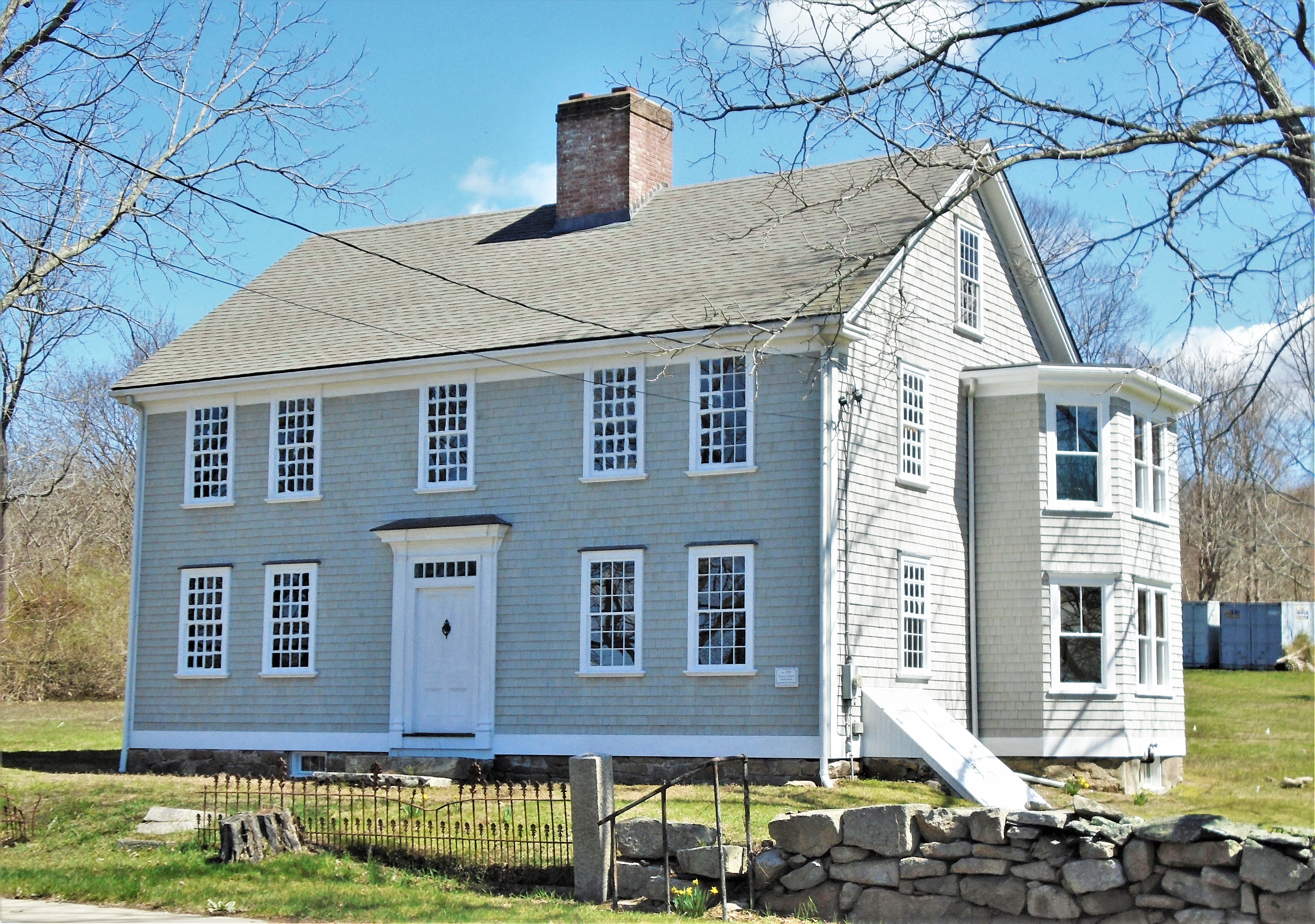
The Thomas Bennett Homestead in the Osborn-Bennett Historic District

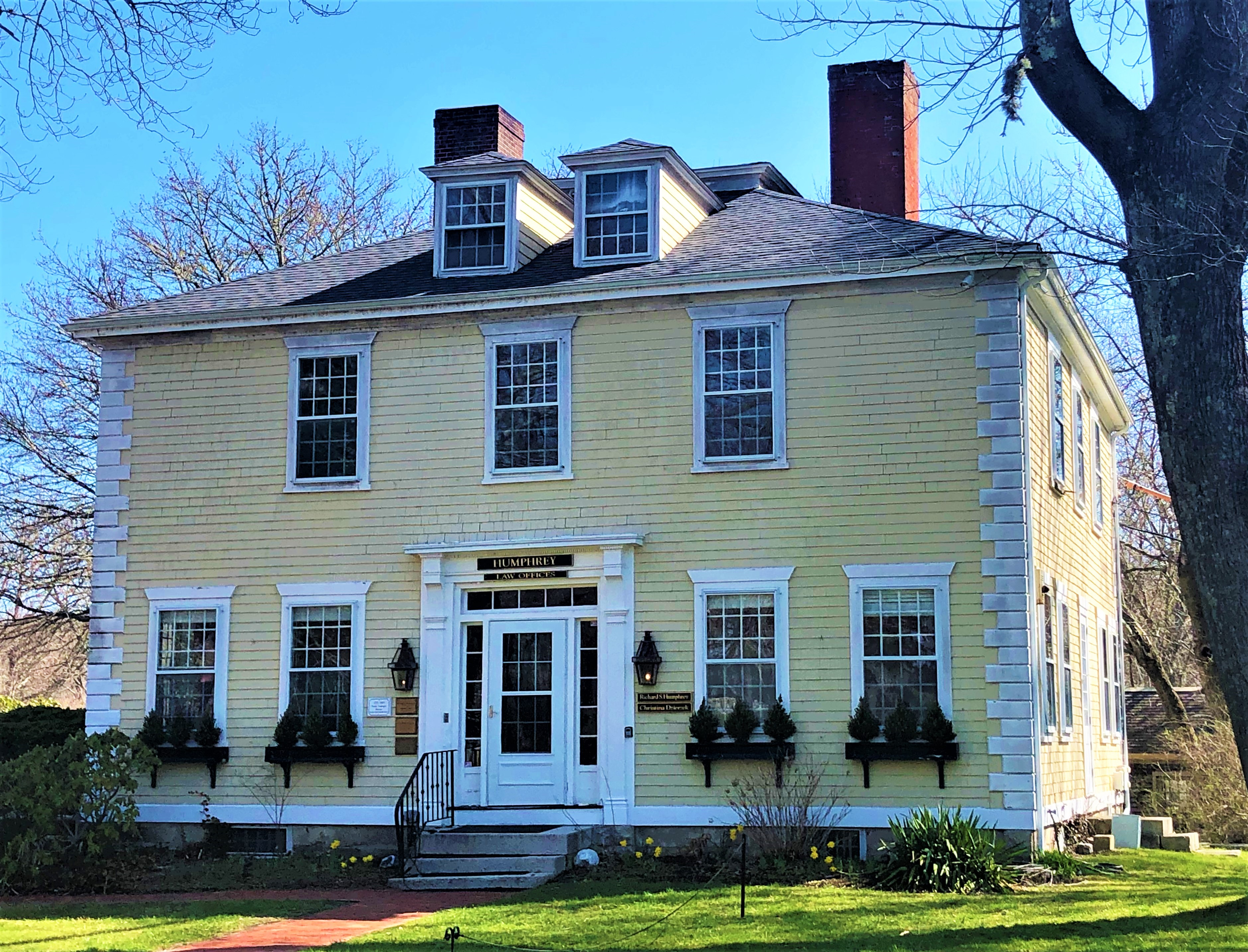
The Soule-Seabury Mansion in the Tiverton Four Corners Historic District

Tiverton was incorporated by English colonists in 1694 within Bristol County in the Province of Massachusetts Bay. As well as being part of Old Dartmouth. In 1746, in the final settlement of a long colonial boundary dispute between Rhode Island and Massachusetts, Tiverton—together with its fellow towns along the eastern shore of Narragansett Bay, Barrington, Bristol and Little Compton, and the town of Cumberland, to the north of Providence—were annexed to Rhode Island by Royal Decree, effective January 27, 1747. Tiverton was incorporated as a town in 1747. Until that year, Tiverton also controlled the area of East Freetown, Massachusetts, as an outpost. The boundary settlement of 1746 had put East Freetown in Massachusetts, and in 1747 it was purchased by Freetown.

Men from the Tiverton outpost took part in the Battle of Freetown, on May 25, 1778, during the Revolutionary War. On the 31st of that month, a party of about 150 British regulars of the 22nd Regiment under the command of Lieutenant-Colonel Campbell attacked the town. Rivington's Gazette reported that the British were making a preemptive attack based on intelligence that the American militia at Tiverton was preparing an attack against them. However, another report in the New Hampshire Gazette stated the militia was waiting in prepared defensive positions. The result of this skirmish was two British killed, several more wounded, and some fire damage to the lower mill in Tiverton. None of the militiamen were wounded or killed.

For about three years during the war, December 1776 – October 1779, the island of Rhode Island, now known as Aquidneck Island, was occupied by the British. During this time, Tiverton was a refuge for Americans fleeing this occupation, and a mustering place for colonial forces gathering to drive out the British. The British occupying forces were eventually withdrawn strategically, as General Clinton marshaled his forces for the 1780 British invasion of South Carolina.)

In its early days, Tiverton was chiefly a farming community with some fishing and boat construction. Until 1900 the manufacture of menhaden oil, a fish derivative, was one of the primary industrial pursuits. Cotton and woolen mills were established as early as 1811, when Colonel Joseph Durfee established a spinning mill at Cook Pond, in what it now the city of Fall River, Massachusetts.

In 1856, the northern part of the town was set apart from Tiverton, and renamed Fall River, Rhode Island, by the Rhode Island General Assembly. On March 1, 1862, in a case between the states that reached the United States Supreme Court, both Fall Rivers were made part of Massachusetts and the state boundary was placed in its current location near State Avenue.

Mark's Stadium is a former soccer stadium located in North Tiverton, Rhode Island. During the 1920s and early 1930s, it was the home of Fall River F.C., one of the era's most successful soccer teams. It is one of the earliest examples of a soccer-specific stadium in the United States. After the demise of the 'Marksmen', the stadium was used as a home ground by other local teams, most notably Fall River F.C. (1932) and Ponta Delgada S.C.

=== Recent events ===
In July 1997 the National Weather Service (NWS) based in Taunton, Massachusetts established a cooperative weather station in the Stone Bridge Village section of town. Named Tiverton-2SW, this station serves as an official meteorological recording station for the town of Tiverton. Data from Tiverton-2SW is collected by the NWS in Taunton, Massachusetts as well as the National Climatic Data Center in Asheville, North Carolina. The NWS closed this station in 2018. The station was dismantled in 2021.

As of 2006, retail shops are the major employers in the town. Since the mid-20th century, Tiverton has grown as a summer resort and residential area, and as a suburb of Fall River, Massachusetts. During the 1960s, Route 24 was constructed through the northern part of the town, connecting Tiverton with Newport, Rhode Island via the Sakonnet River Bridge.

In 2002, contaminated soil, including some soil that was blue, was discovered in the Bay Street neighborhood of Tiverton. In 2003, private property testing began. Contaminants including arsenic, lead, cyanide, and more were found at levels above residential exposure guidelines. Residents have been prohibited from digging in the soil. ENACT (Environmental Neighborhood Awareness Committee of Tiverton) advocates on behalf of the community. Property values in the neighborhood have plummeted due to the contamination and the moratorium on digging soil, which meant that residents of this neighborhood have lost their home equity. One of ENACT's successes has been the passage of legislation to create the Environmentally Contaminated Home Ownership (ECHO) loan program, which provides loans for people whose home equity has been sharply reduced due to contamination. The Rhode Island Department of Environmental Management (RIDEM) has been involved in developing work plans to treat the contamination.

On September 1, 2018, the Tiverton Casino Hotel (now Bally's Tiverton) was opened to the public, after Twin River Worldwide Holdings closed the Newport Grand Casino and moved its gaming license to the new facility.

== Geography ==
Tiverton is located on the eastern shore of Narragansett Bay, across the Sakonnet River from Aquidneck Island (also known as the Island of Rhode Island). Together with the adjacent town of Little Compton, the area is disconnected from the rest of the state of Rhode Island. The northern portion of the town is located on Mount Hope Bay.

Much of the town is located along a granite ridge which runs in a north–south direction, rising approximately 170 feet in elevation from the bay. A large section of exposed granite can be observed at the highway cut for Route 24, near the Main Road interchange.

According to the United States Census Bureau, Tiverton has a total area of 36.3 square miles (94 km^{2}), of which 29.4 square miles (76 km^{2}) is land and 18.0 km^{2} (6.9 sq mi); 19.16%) is water.

The northern portion of greater Tiverton is also known as North Tiverton.

At times, Tiverton has been considered a part of the South Coast region of Massachusetts despite the town residing entirely within Rhode Island. By its most literal definition, the South Coast encompasses the geographic area of Massachusetts that borders Buzzards Bay (excluding the Elizabeth Islands, Bourne and Falmouth), Mount Hope Bay and the Sakonnet River. It has been argued that Little Compton and Tiverton share more in common with the regional identities of the South Coast communities of Westport, Dartmouth and Fall River than the rest of Newport County.

The two beaches in Tiverton are Fogland Beach and Grinnell's Beach. Both beaches are located on the Sakonnet River.

=== Climate ===
Climate data for Tiverton, Rhode Island (1991–2020 normals, extremes 1998–present
Month	Jan	Feb	Mar	Apr	May	Jun	Jul	Aug	Sep	Oct	Nov	Dec	Year
Record high °F (°C)	63 (17)	66 (19)	75 (24)	90 (32)	96 (36)	100 (38)	103 (39)	101 (38)	96 (36)	84 (29)	74 (23)	71 (22)	103 (39)
Mean daily maximum °F (°C)	38.5 (3.6)	41.3 (5.2)	49.0 (9.4)	60.0 (15.6)	70.1 (21.2)	79.3 (26.3)	84.9 (29.4)	84.0 (28.9)	76.9 (24.9)	64.3 (17.9)	52.7 (11.5)	43.3 (6.3)	62.0 (16.7)
Daily mean °F (°C)	31.0 (−0.6)	32.9 (0.5)	39.7 (4.3)	49.6 (9.8)	59.6 (15.3)	68.8 (20.4)	74.9 (23.8)	74.0 (23.3)	67.1 (19.5)	55.4 (13.0)	44.8 (7.1)	36.4 (2.4)	52.8 (11.6)
Mean daily minimum °F (°C)	23.6 (−4.7)	24.5 (−4.2)	30.3 (−0.9)	39.3 (4.1)	49.0 (9.4)	58.4 (14.7)	65.0 (18.3)	64.0 (17.8)	57.3 (14.1)	46.6 (8.1)	37.0 (2.8)	29.5 (−1.4)	43.7 (6.5)
Record low °F (°C)	−5 (−21)	−7 (−22)	7 (−14)	20 (−7)	33 (1)	40 (4)	51 (11)	51 (11)	38 (3)	29 (−2)	13 (−11)	5 (−15)	−7 (−22)
Average precipitation inches (mm)	4.01 (102)	3.84 (98)	5.55 (141)	4.50 (114)	3.57 (91)	3.66 (93)	2.96 (75)	3.81 (97)	3.93 (100)	4.54 (115)	4.11 (104)	4.91 (125)	49.39 (1,255)
Average snowfall inches (cm)	10.9 (28)	11.3 (29)	7.4 (19)	0.6 (1.5)	0.0 (0.0)	0.0 (0.0)	0.0 (0.0)	0.0 (0.0)	0.0 (0.0)	0.0 (0.0)	0.6 (1.5)	7.3 (19)	38.1 (97)
Average precipitation days (≥ 0.01 in)	12.3	11.4	11.7	13.1	13.1	11.5	9.8	9.1	9.4	11.7	9.9	12.6	135.6
Average snowy days (≥ 0.1 in)	5.2	5.2	3.3	0.4	0.0	0.0	0.0	0.0	0.0	0.0	0.4	3.4	17.9
Source: NOAA

== Demographics ==
Historical population
Census	Pop.	Note	%±
1790	2,453		—
1800	2,717		10.8%
1810	2,837		4.4%
1820	2,875		1.3%
1830	2,905		1.0%
1840	3,183		9.6%
1850	4,699		47.6%
1860	1,927		−59.0%
1870	1,808		−6.2%
1880	2,505		38.6%
1890	2,837		13.3%
1900	2,977		4.9%
1910	4,032		35.4%
1920	3,894		−3.4%
1930	4,578		17.6%
1940	5,018		9.6%
1950	5,659		12.8%
1960	9,461		67.2%
1970	12,559		32.7%
1980	13,526		7.7%
1990	14,312		5.8%
2000	15,260		6.6%
2010	15,780		3.4%
2020	16,359		3.7%
U.S. Decennial Census

As of the census of 2020, there were 16,359 people and 6,853 households in the town. The population density was 563.0 inhabitants per square mile (217.4/km^{2}). There were 7,781 housing units in the town. The racial makeup of the town was 91.88% White, 0.97% Black, 0.13% Native American, 1.08% Asian, 0.04% Pacific Islander, 0.97% from other races, and 4.91% from two or more races. Hispanic or Latino of any race were 2.60% of the population.

There were 6,853 households, out of which 21.7% had children under the age of 18 living with them, 55.5% were married couples living together, 24.7% had a female householder with no spouse present, and 11.8% had a male householder with no spouse present. Of all households, 9.2% were made up of individuals, and 3.3% had someone living alone who was 65 years of age or older. The average household size was 2.36 and the average family size was 2.85.

The age distribution of the population of Tiverton was 14.7% under the age of 18, 6.1% from 18 to 24, 23.4% from 25 to 44, 30.7% from 45 to 64, and 25.1% 65 years and older. The median age was 49.5 years.

The median income for a household in the town was $99,542, and the median income for a family was $122,469. The per capita income for the town was $50,619. About 2.9% of families and 5.5% of the population were below the poverty line, including 2.3% of those under age 18 and 8.0% of those age 65 or over.

== Arts and culture ==
Historic sites include:

- Bourne Mill
- Cook-Bateman Farm
- First Baptist Church of Tiverton
- Fort Barton Site
- Osborn-Bennett Historic District
- Tiverton Four Corners Historic District

=== Library ===
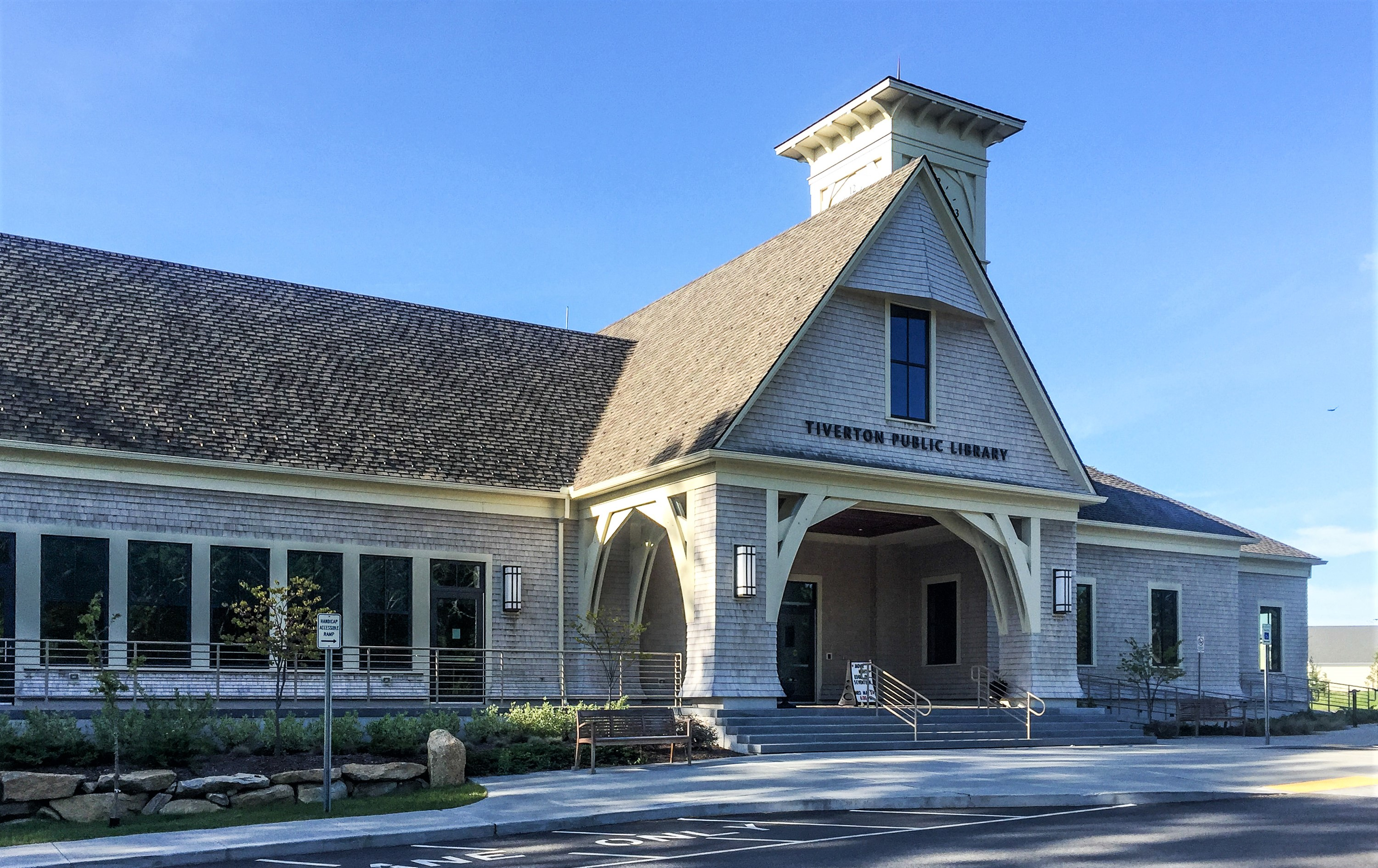
Tiverton Public Library

The Tiverton Public Library was chartered by the state in 1927. The library was housed in several locations around town over the years.

In June 2015 a new 24,000 square feet (2,200 m^{2}) building was opened, incorporating a meeting hall, teen room, cafe, children's library, and public courtyard spaces. The new building, designed by Union Studio architects, features a clock tower and gabled ends. The new library received an AIA Rhode Island Design Award for Merit in 2018.

A branch, the Union Public Library located at 3832 Main Road and part of the Tiverton Four Corners Historic District, has operated on that site almost continuously since 1820, although the current Early Victorian building dates from 1868. A paid staff member is assisted by volunteers from the Union Public Library Association to provide a reading room and library services.

== Education ==
Tiverton has four active public schools: Pocasset Elementary School, Ranger Elementary School, Tiverton Middle School, and Tiverton High School. The town is its own district and a part of the Newport County district.

== Notable people ==
- Robert Gray (1755–1806), merchant captain and explorer
- Samuel Gray (1718–1770), killed at the Boston Massacre
- Russell Warren (1783–1860), architect
