= Westport =

Westport is the name of several communities around the world.

== Canada ==
- Westport, Nova Scotia
- Westport, Ontario
  - Westport Rideaus, local junior "B" ice hockey team
  - Westport/Rideau Lakes Airport
- Westport, Newfoundland and Labrador

== Ireland ==
- Westport, County Mayo, a town
  - Westport House, a country house
  - Westport railway station, Mayo
  - Westport United F.C., football club
  - Westport CFE – Carrowbeg College

== Malaysia ==
- West Port, Malaysia

== New Zealand ==
- Westport, New Zealand
  - Westport Airport (New Zealand)
  - Westport Rugby Football Club

== United Kingdom ==
- Westport, Somerset
  - Westport Canal
- Westport, Wiltshire

== United States ==
- Westport, California
- Westport, Connecticut
  - Westport Country Playhouse, a theatre
  - Westport (Metro-North station)
  - Westport Bank and Trust Company, a historic place
  - Westport Public Library
- Westport, Indiana
- Westport Township, Dickinson County, Iowa
- Westport, Kentucky, in Oldham Co.
  - Westport High School (Kentucky), in Louisville, named for the Westport Road
- Westport Island, Maine
  - Westport Community Church
- Westport, Baltimore, Maryland
  - Westport (Baltimore Light Rail station)
- Westport, Massachusetts
  - Westport High School (Massachusetts)
  - Westport River in Massachusetts
  - Westport Point Historic District
  - Westport Town Farm
- Westport, Minnesota
- Westport Township, Pope County, Minnesota
- Westport, Kansas City, a historic district of Kansas City, Missouri
  - Westport High School (Missouri)
  - Westport Middle School
- Westport Plaza, a resort and entertainment center in Maryland Heights, Missouri
- Westport, New York, a town
  - Westport (CDP), New York, a hamlet in the town
  - Westport (Amtrak station)
- Westport, North Carolina
- Westport, Oklahoma
- Westport, Oregon
- Westport, Pennsylvania
- Westport, South Dakota
- Westport, Tennessee
- Westport, Washington
  - Westport Light State Park
- Westport, Wisconsin
- Westport, Richland County, Wisconsin

== Other uses ==
- Westport Records, a record label
- Westport Innovations, an international company headquartered in Vancouver, Canada
- USS Westport, the name of more than one United States Navy ship
- SS Westport, the name of a number of merchant ships
- CCGS Westport, a Canadian Coast Guard search and rescue vessel
- Battle of Westport, 1864, in what is now Kansas City, Missouri

== See also ==
- West Port (disambiguation)
- Westport Airport (disambiguation)
- Irish place names in other countries
