= Westport High School =

Westport High School may refer to:

- Westport High School (Massachusetts)
- Westport High School (Missouri)
- Westport High School (Kansas), now known as Westport Middle School
- Westport High School (Kentucky), now known as Westport Middle School
- Staples High School (Connecticut), located in Westport.

See also:

- West Port High School
