= Massachusetts Route 88 =

State highway in Bristol County, Massachusetts, US

Route 88
- Route 88 highlighted in red

Route information
- Maintained by MassDOT
- Length: 11.30 mi (18.19 km)

Major junctions
- South end: John Reed Road in Westport
- Route 177 in Westport; US 6 in Westport
- North end: I-195 in Westport

Location
- Country: United States
- State: Massachusetts
- Counties: Bristol

Highway system
- Massachusetts State Highway System; Interstate; US; State
← Route 86	→ I-90

Route 88 is a 11.30-mile-long (18.19 km) north–south state highway in the town of Westport in southeastern Massachusetts. At just over 11 miles, it is the longest Massachusetts state route to be situated in only one town. It begins at John Reed Road and ends at an interchange with I-195.

== Route description ==
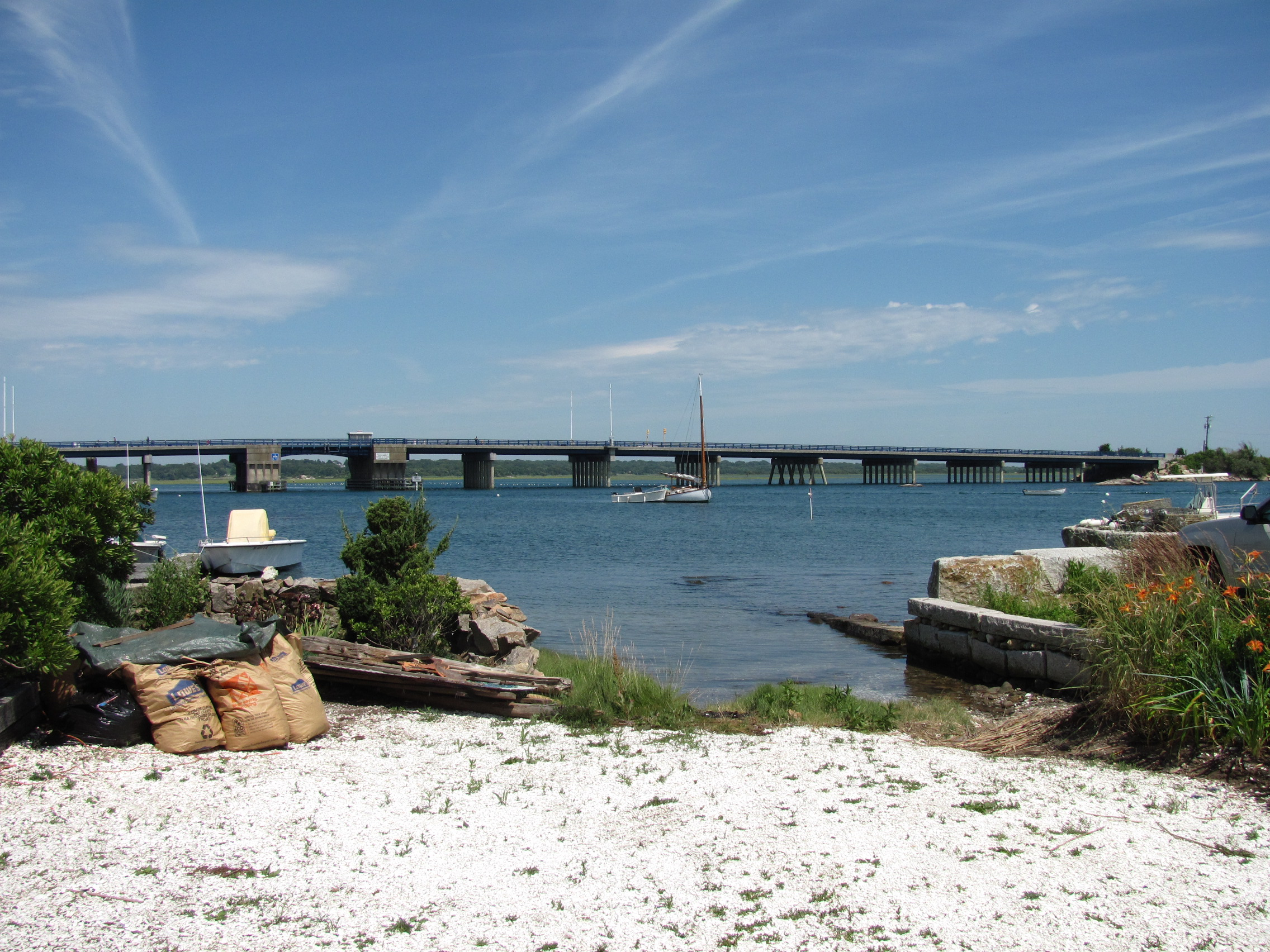
The Fontaine Bridge from Westport Point.

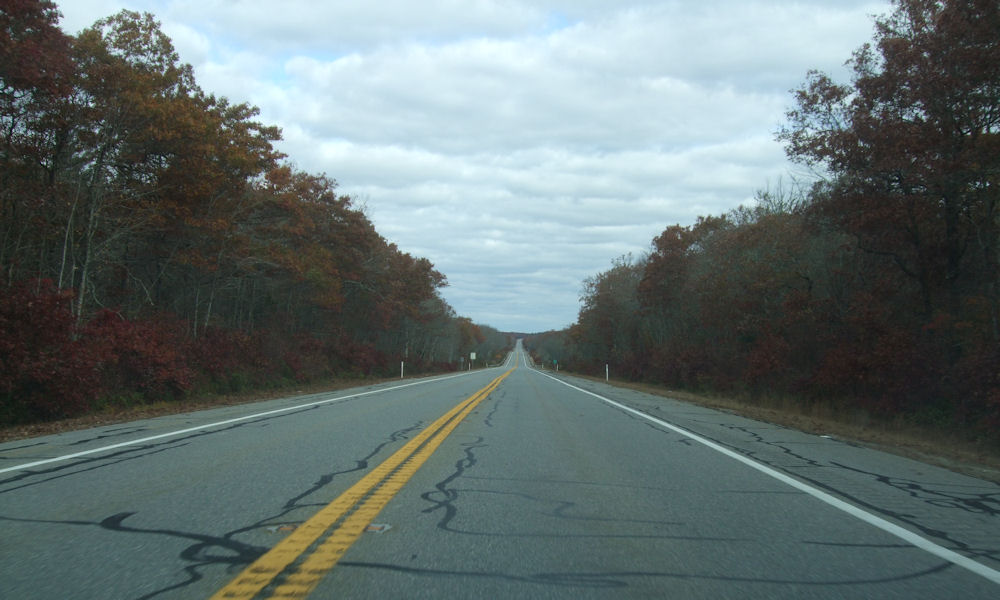
Near Mile Marker 2 looking northbound.

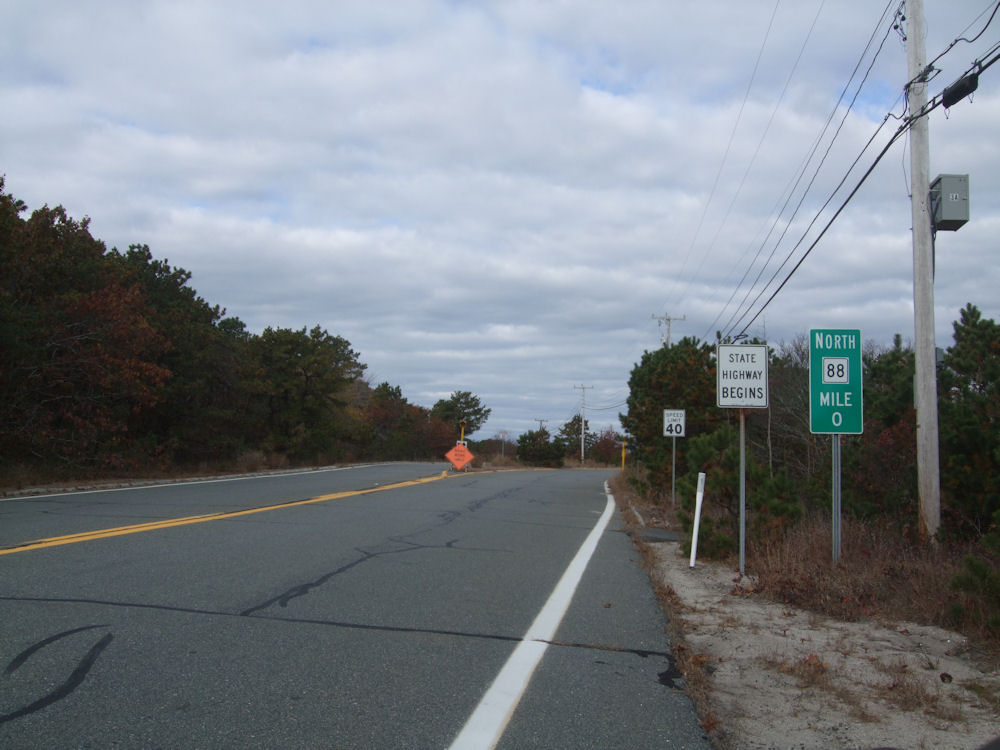
The southern terminus of Route 88.

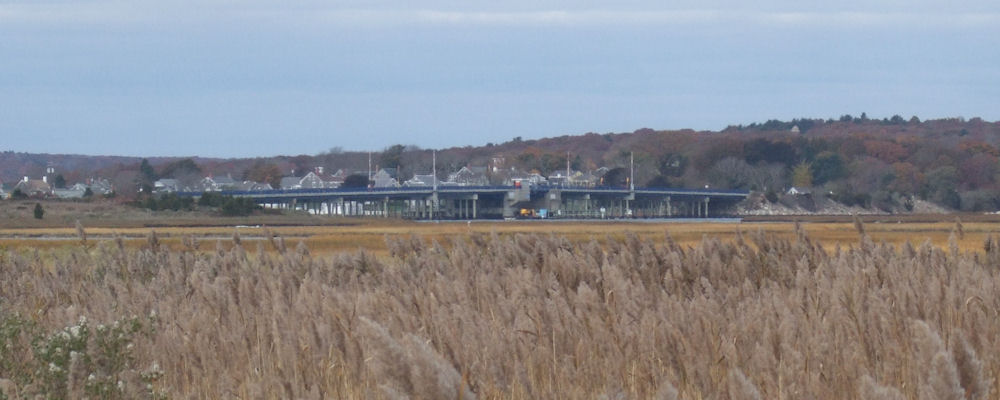
The Fontaine Bridge from Horseneck Beach State Reservation.

Route 88 begins at the northern end of the Horseneck Beach State Reservation lands, on a peninsula dividing the East Branch of the Westport River from Buzzards Bay. After just 0.3 miles (0.48 km), it crosses the Normand Edward Fontaine Bridge over that river into the Westport Point section of town. The road has five at-grade intersections with stoplights and two ramped overpass intersections.

Route 88 ends just north of Route 6 and the abandoned Old Colony Rail line at an interchange with I-195, where westbound entrance and exit fly on separate overpasses over the interstate, and eastbound entrance and exit are direct ramps with no flyovers.

Route 88 is a two-lane expressway or "Super-2." Route 88 (like other such roads) is peculiar in its design in that, while it has at-grade intersections with town roads and is not divided by barriers or grass median between the Fontaine Bridge and Old County Road (except at intersections), there is no development of any kind that abuts the route directly; the only property that comes close is an ice cream stand on the southeast corner of Route 88 and Hixbridge Road, but even this only has a driveway from Hixbridge Road.

== Major intersections ==
The entire route is in Westport, Bristol County.

mi	km	Destinations	Notes
0.0	0.0	John Reed Road	Southern terminus; to Horseneck Beach State Reservation
		Normand Edward Fontaine Bridge over the Westport River	
1.2	1.9	Drift Road	At-grade intersection
4.2	6.8	Hixbridge Road	At-grade intersection
6.3	10.1	Charlotte White Road Extension	At-grade intersection
7.8	12.6	Old County Road	At-grade intersection
8.6	13.8	Route 177 – Newport, RI, New Bedford	Interchange
10.3	16.6	Briggs Road	At-grade intersection
11.0	17.7	US 6 – North Westport, Dartmouth	Interchange
11.3	18.2	I-195 – Providence, RI, New Bedford	Northern terminus; exit 16 on I-195
1.000 mi = 1.609 km; 1.000 km = 0.621 mi
