= Normand Edward Fontaine Bridge =

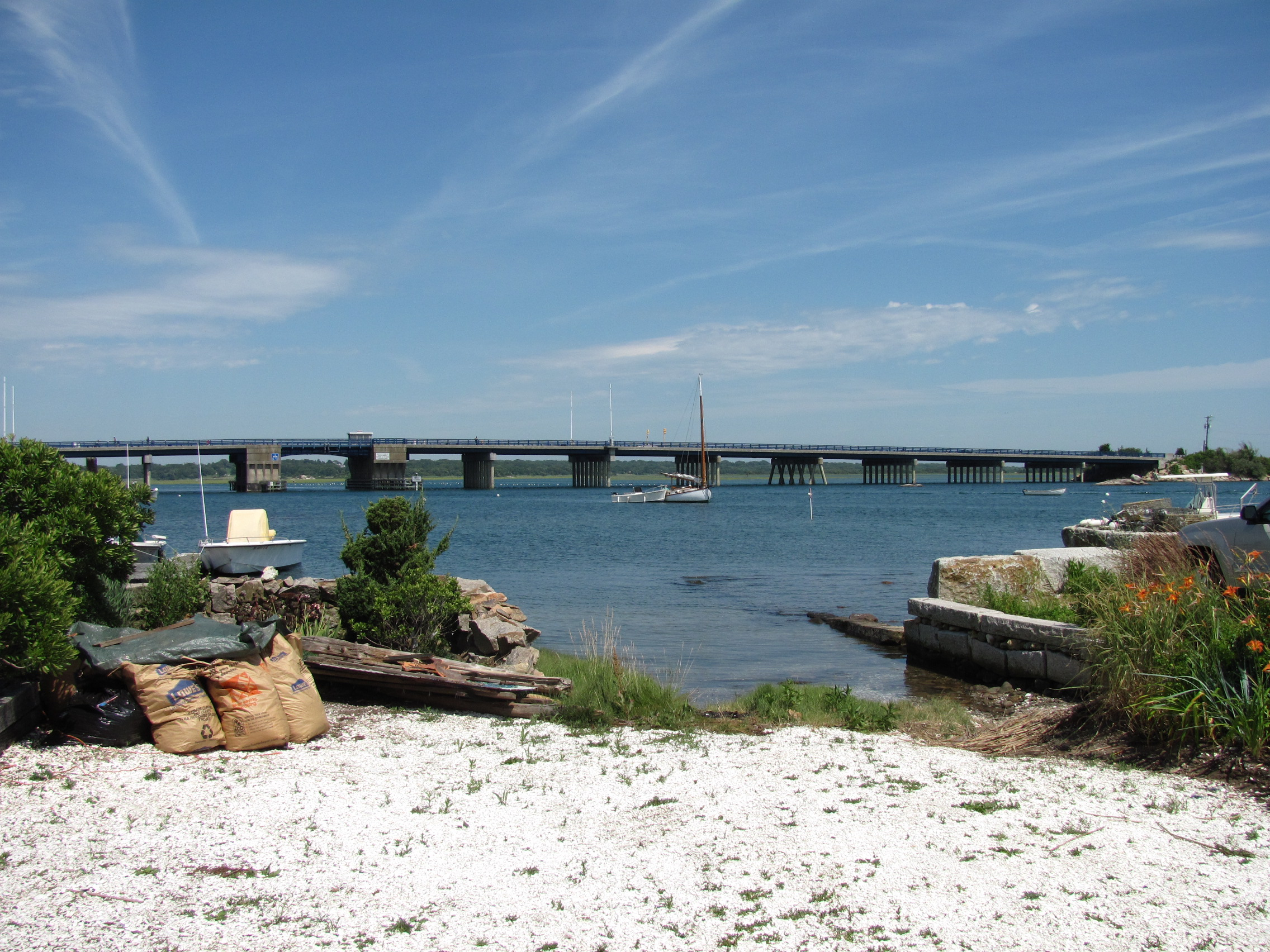
- Coordinates: 41°31′02″N 71°04′05″W
- Carries: Route 88
- Crosses: East Branch of the Westport River
- Other name(s): Westport River Bridge, Bascule Bridge

Characteristics
- Design: Bascule

History
- Opened: 1958

Statistics
- Daily traffic: 7,500

Location
- Interactive map of Normand Edward Fontaine Bridge

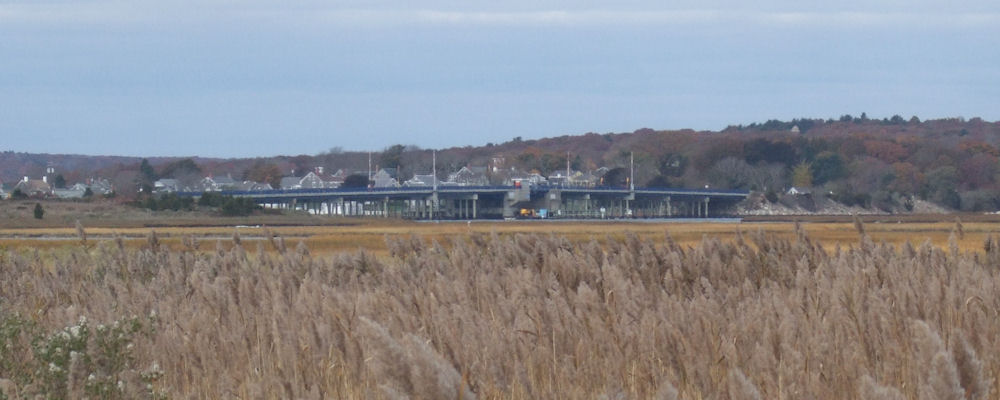
The bridge's east side as viewed from Horseneck Beach State Reservation.

The Normand Edward Fontaine Bridge is a 1,025 feet (312 m)-long bascule bridge at 41.517258°N 71.06799°W in Westport, Massachusetts, USA. Two lanes of Route 88 pass over the bridge from Westport Point and Wood Point in the Westport Point section of town to the Horseneck Beach State Reservation, connecting with Cherry & Webb Lane and, eventually, John Reed Road when Route 88 officially ends 0.3 miles south of the bridge's southern end.

The bridge, whose bascule channel spans 75 feet (23 m), crosses over the East Branch of the Westport River, just east of where that branch begins. The branch itself also branches at this point, with the main portion of the river turning north around Wood Point, and the Horseneck Channel to The Let leading southeastward.

The bridge, originally known as the Westport River Bridge, was built in 1958 to carry Route 88 to the Horseneck Beach State Reservation. It was renamed in 1983 for Specialist 4th Class Normand Edward Fontaine, a Westport resident who was killed in the line of duty during the Vietnam War. The rehabilitation and resurfacing of the bridge began in 2003, taking several years.
