= Barbara Viera =

American volleyball coach (1940s–2026)

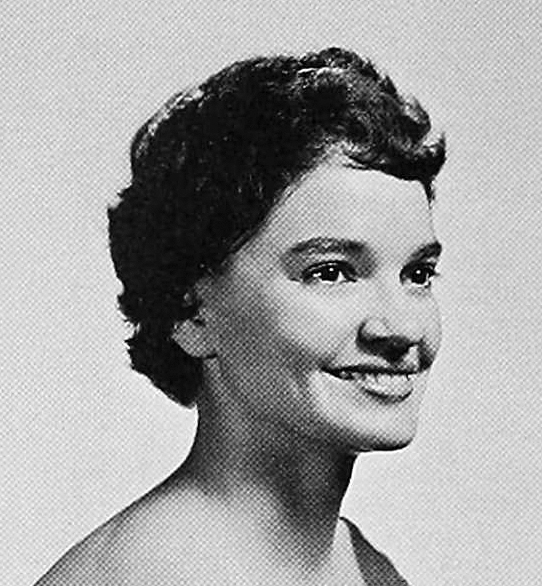
- University yearbook portrait, 1963

Personal information
- Born: 1940 or 1941; Fall River, Massachusetts, U.S.
- Died: April 28, 2026 (age 85); Tiverton, Rhode Island, U.S.
- Education: University of Massachusetts Amherst

Coaching information
Previous teams coached
Years	Teams
1973–1999	Delaware

Barbara L. Viera (1940/1941 – April 28, 2026) was an American volleyball coach. She served 27 years as head coach of the Delaware Fightin' Blue Hens women's volleyball team, winning over 680 games in her career, a total that placed her among the top 10 in NCAA Division I women's volleyball history. Viera was part of the inaugural induction class to the American Volleyball Coaches Association (AVCA) Hall of Fame.

== Early life and education ==
Barbara L. Viera was born in Fall River, Massachusetts, in 1940 or 1941. One of four sisters, she grew up in Westport, Massachusetts. Her family immigrated to the U.S. from the Azores. She attended Westport High School, where she graduated in 1959 as class valedictorian. In high school, she competed in field hockey, volleyball, basketball, softball and track. Viera earned a total of 12 varsity letters and was three-time captain of the basketball team, setting the school record with 44 points in a game while finishing with an average of 21.8 points per game and 872 career points. She was also a four-year starter in field hockey, winning the conference title as a senior, and was part of a Westport conference championship softball team as a junior while captaining the team in her senior year.

After high school, Viera attended the University of Massachusetts Amherst. There was no program for women's sports there, and Viera afterwards "became committed to seeing that women would one day have the opportunity to compete and play sports at all levels". She graduated from Massachusetts in 1963 as an honors student and later earned a master's degree and a doctoral degree from Springfield College. During the 1960s, she was a high school teacher and coach.

== Coaching career ==
Viera served as the women's volleyball coach at Springfield College for one season in 1970, posting a record of 5–5. While at Springfield, she heard about an opportunity to coach at the University of Delaware and interviewed there. She received the job and became an assistant professor, moving to Newark, Delaware, that year. She later served as a physical education professor. Viera served as Delaware's women's field hockey coach in 1972, then was named women's volleyball coach in 1973, a position she held for 27 seasons.

Viera's compiled a record of 14–6–1 in her first year, 1973. It was one of what was 17 straight seasons with winning records the team had under her leadership. Her teams participated twice each in the Association of Intercollegiate Athletics for Women (AIAW) tournament and the National Invitational Volleyball Championship. In both the 1977 and 1980 seasons, they compiled 38 wins, a team record, while she led Delaware to the 1979 Eastern AIAW championship. She also had winning seasons in 22 of 27 seasons, along with eight seasons with over 30 wins, and every team she coached reached the conference post-season tournament. Viera's Fightin' Blue Hens won three conference championships and she was a four-time winner of the conference coach of the year award, with one of those awards coming in the East Coast Conference (1986) and three in the America East Conference (1992, 1994, 1996).

The News Journal described her as a "pioneer and tireless supporter of women's athletics at all levels". At the time of her retirement, she had compiled an overall record of 687–434–4 across her career at Springfield and Delaware. Her record of 682–429–4 at Delaware ranked her seventh all-time in NCAA Division I history. She was also active in promoting volleyball locally, running many camps and youth programs. Viera had international coaching experience as well, coaching U.S. teams that competed in Argentina, Barbados, Costa Rica, Guatemala, Mexico, Panama, and St. Lucia. She wrote two books on volleyball and more than 30 articles, and worked as a competition assistant at the 1996 Summer Olympics in Atlanta. After retiring from the University of Delaware, she served as a player and coach in a local senior volleyball league.

Matt Zabitka said that Viera "probably could've made it big coaching almost any sport. She possesses traces of Lou Holtz's ability to motivate, Joe Paterno's doggedness and Buddy Ryan's never ceasing optimism, sprinkled with a bit of Mother Teresa." She received many honors for her career, including induction to the Westport High School Hall of Fame in 1989, the Delaware Volleyball Coaches Association Hall of Fame in 2002, both the University of Delaware Hall of Fame and the American Volleyball Coaches Association (AVCA) Hall of Fame in 2003, and the Delaware Sports Museum and Hall of Fame in 2004. She was part of the AVCA Hall of Fame's first induction class. The University of Delaware's volleyball court was named in her honor. The News Journal ranked her 112th on their 2023 list of the "125 Greatest Coaches in Delaware History".

== Personal life and death ==
Viera lived in Newark, Delaware, until moving in 2024 to be nearer to her family. She died in Tiverton, Rhode Island, on April 28, 2026, at the age of 85.
