= Lee's Market (Westport, Massachusetts) =

Lees Market is located in Westport, Massachusetts, United States, and was owned by the Lees family for over 60 years. Lees was established in March 1949 when Al Lees opened a general store on Main Road across from Santos farm. In the 1970s and 1980s, the market underwent a massive expansion, adding a bakery, delicatessen and wine department. In early 2014, Lees Market was purchased by Tracy Anthony of the Clements Family (who operate Clements' Marketplace in Portsmouth, Rhode Island). Today, Lees has over 100 employees.
