= Frances Strickland =

American psychologist

First Lady of Ohio
- In role January 8, 2007 – January 8, 2011
- Governor: Ted Strickland
- Preceded by: Hope Taft
- Succeeded by: Karen Kasich

Personal details
- Born: Frances Smith; July 25, 1941 (age 84) Simpsonville, Kentucky, U.S.
- Spouse: Ted Strickland (m. 1987)
- Occupation: Educational psychologist

Frances Strickland (née Smith; born July 25, 1941) is an American educational psychologist who served as the First Lady of Ohio from January 8, 2007, to January 8, 2011.

== Biography ==
Frances Smith grew up on a dairy farm in Simpsonville, Kentucky. After graduating with a bachelor's degree in health and physical education from Murray State University in 1963, she taught at Westport High School in Jefferson County and worked at various residential programs for children. In 1976, Smith received her doctorate in educational psychology at the University of Kentucky. She met Ted Strickland there the day after Christmas in 1973. They married exactly 13 years later, in 1987, and chose not to have children due to their age. After she graduated, Frances Strickland served as a public school psychologist for many years.

As president of Smith Educational Enterprises, Strickland wrote The Little Girl Who Grew Up to Be Governor, a 1991 children's novel about Martha Layne Collins, the first female Governor of Kentucky.

The "Beautiful Ohio" license plate, largely designed by Frances Strickland

As the First Lady of Ohio, she served as the chair of the Ohio Family and Children First councils, composed of state-agency leaders that helps families seeking government services. She is largely given credit for the design of the "Beautiful Ohio" license plate that was introduced in 2009 and served as Ohio's standard license plate from 2010 to 2012. For Strickland, its agricultural theme, particularly the windmill, recalled her childhood on a dairy farm. During her husband's reelection campaign, she often played the guitar at rallies for her husband.

== Bibliography ==
- Smith, Frances (1991). The Little Girl Who Grew Up to Be Governor: Stories from the Life of Martha Layne Collins. Denham Publishing Company. ISBN 0963013505.
