= Rhode Island Route 24 =

State highway in Newport County, Rhode Island, US

Route 24
- Fall River Expressway
- Route 24 highlighted in red

Route information
- Maintained by RIDOT
- Length: 7.7 mi (12.4 km)
- Existed: 1966–present

Major junctions
- South end: Route 114 in Portsmouth
- Route 138 in Portsmouth; Route 77 / Route 138 in Tiverton
- North end: Route 24 at the Massachusetts state line

Location
- Country: United States
- State: Rhode Island
- Counties: Newport

Highway system
- Rhode Island Routes
← Route 15	→ Route 33

Route 24 is a freeway in the U.S. state of Rhode Island. It runs approximately 8 miles (13 km) from Route 114 in Portsmouth to Massachusetts Route 24 in Fall River, Massachusetts. Route 24 is the primary freeway access for the two towns in the southeastern corner of the state, Tiverton and Little Compton. Though on the mainland, they are isolated from the rest of the state by an arm of the Narragansett Bay. Because of this, the main freeway connection to Providence involves using Rhode Island Route 24, Massachusetts Route 24, and Interstate 195.

== Route description ==
Route 24 starts at Route 114 in Portsmouth. It heads northeast and has a short concurrency with Route 138 over the Sakonnet River Bridge to Tiverton. It continues northeast until the border with Fall River, Massachusetts, where it continues as Massachusetts Route 24.

== Exit list ==
Exits were formerly numbered only on gore signs until 2014, when a project put numbers on all signs except for at Fish Road. All interchanges in Rhode Island, including Route 24, will be renumbered to mileage-based numbers by 2020 under a plan announced by RIDOT in the fall of 2017. In November 2019, RIDOT announced that Route 24 will be renumbering the exits in spring 2020. The entire route is in Newport County.

Location	mi	km	Old exit	New exit	Destinations	Notes
Portsmouth	0.0	0.0	–	–	Route 114 south (West Main Road)	Southern terminus
Portsmouth	0.8	1.3	–	1	To Route 138 south – Middletown, Newport Beaches	Southbound exit and northbound entrance; access via Turnpike Avenue
Portsmouth	2.0	3.2	–	2	Route 138 south (Boyds Lane) – Island Park, Portsmouth, Bristol	Southern end of Route 138 concurrency; no southbound entrance; Route 138 not signed northbound
Portsmouth	3.3– 3.6	5.3– 5.8	–	3	Hummocks Avenue / Anthony Road / Common Fence Point / Island Park	Signed for Hummocks Ave. northbound, Anthony Rd./Island Park southbound
Sakonnet River	3.9	6.3	Sakonnet River Bridge			
Tiverton	4.2	6.8	4	–	To Route 77 / Route 177 – Tiverton, Little Compton	Former northbound exit and southbound entrance
Tiverton	4.4	7.1	5	4	Route 77 south / Route 138 north to Route 177 – North Tiverton, Tiverton, Little Compton	Northern end of Route 138 concurrency; northern terminus of Route 77
Tiverton	5.3	8.5	6	5	Fish Road	
Tiverton	7.7	12.4	–	–	Route 24 north – Fall River, Boston	Continuation into Massachusetts
1.000 mi = 1.609 km; 1.000 km = 0.621 mi: Closed/former; Concurrency terminus; Incomplete access

== See also ==
- Rhode Island Route 4
