= West Port =

West Port can refer to:

- West Port, Edinburgh, Scotland
- West Port, Malaysia

== See also ==
- West Port murders, Edinburgh, Scotland
- West Port High School, Florida, United States
- Westport (disambiguation)
