= Karen Waldbillig Kasich =

American business executive (born 1963)

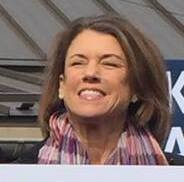

First Lady of Ohio
- In office January 10, 2011 – January 14, 2019
- Governor: John Kasich
- Preceded by: Frances Strickland
- Succeeded by: Fran DeWine

Personal details
- Born: Karen Waldbillig; December 26, 1963 (age 62) Upper Arlington, Ohio, U.S.
- Party: Republican
- Spouse: John Kasich (m. 1997)
- Children: 2
- Education: Ohio State University
- Occupation: Business executive

Karen Waldbillig Kasich (born December 26, 1963) is an American business executive who is the wife of former Governor of Ohio John Kasich.

Kasich was born in Upper Arlington, Ohio, a suburb of Columbus, and obtained a bachelor's degree in communications from Ohio State University. She and then-Congressman Kasich were married in 1997.

Kasich left her job as vice president with GSW Worldwide, a health-care advertising agency, to become a full-time parent when the Kasichs' twin daughters were two years old.

Karen Kasich, alongside her daughters, campaigned with the Governor in New Hampshire in the weeks before the 2016 New Hampshire Republican presidential primary.

== Political efforts ==
As a result of the loss of her mother to congestive heart failure, Kasich has been involved in multiple statewide efforts to increase awareness surrounding women's heart health. She has partnered with the Ohio State University's College of Nursing and the Million Hearts Campaign, which promotes health screenings that aid in the prevention of heart attacks and strokes. She also serves as statewide ambassador for After-School All-Stars Ohio, "a program that provides at-risk students with after-school academic support, mentoring, and fitness activities in a safe environment."

Kasich is currently a member of both The Partnership at Drugfree.org's public relations advisory board and the Ohio Valley's Go Red for Women Council (a program of the American Heart Association which empowers women to live heart-healthy lifestyles). Additionally, she is an Ohio Department of Transportation's Safe Routes to School ambassador, and her efforts involve encouraging children to walk and bike to school safely and confidently.

Along with her husband, John Kasich, she has toured Ohio to promote Ohio's youth drug prevention program, Start Talking!.

== Personal life ==
A self-professed "fitness freak," Kasich enjoys swimming and running, and has completed multiple marathons.

== Media ==
- Karen Kasich: Fitness Fanatic and First Lady of Ohio

Honorary titles
Preceded by Frances Strickland	First Lady of Ohio; 2011–2019	Succeeded by Fran DeWine
