= Route 177 (Rhode Island–Massachusetts) =

Highway in Rhode Island and Massachusetts

Route 177
- Route 177 highlighted in red

Route information
- Maintained by RIDOT and MassDOT
- Length: 8.4 mi (13.5 km) 3.5 miles (5.6 km) in Rhode Island; 4.9 miles (7.9 km) in Massachusetts

Major junctions
- West end: Route 77 in Tiverton, RI
- Route 81 in Tiverton, RI; Route 88 in Westport, MA
- East end: US 6 in Westport, MA

Location
- Country: United States
- State: Rhode Island
- Counties: Newport (RI), Bristol (MA)

Highway system
- Rhode Island Routes
- Massachusetts State Highway System; Interstate; US; State
← Route 165	RI Route 177	→ Route 179
← Route 169	MA Route 177	→ Route 181

Route 177 is an 8.4-mile-long (13.5 km) alignment of state highways in Rhode Island and Massachusetts. The western terminus is at an intersection with Route 77 in Tiverton, Rhode Island and the eastern terminus is at an intersection with US 6 in Westport, Massachusetts.

== Route description ==
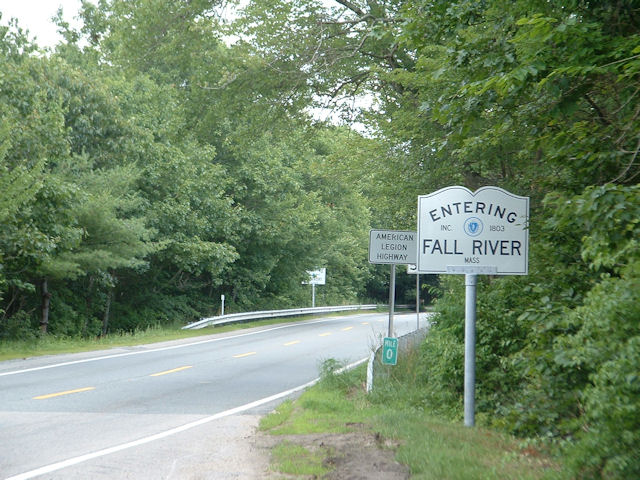
Route 177 enters Massachusetts in the city of Fall River. A portion of the Westport town line sign approximately 350 feet east can be seen near the center of the photo

Route 177 begins in Rhode Island at an intersection with Route 77 (Main Road) in Tiverton near Nannaquaket Pond. The route progresses northeast as Bulgamarsh Road through a residential neighborhood. After the intersection with Fish Road, Route 177 turns eastward and leaves downtown Tiverton. More woodlands begin to surround the two-lane highway before turning eastward into Bliss Corners, where it curves to the south of Stafford Pond. In downtown Bliss Corners, Route 177 intersects with Route 81 (Stafford/Crandall Roads). After the intersection with Route 81, Route 177 turns eastward one last time out of Bliss Corners and crosses the Massachusetts state line, entering a remote section of the city of Fall River, Massachusetts.

After crossing the state line into Massachusetts, Route 177 becomes known as American Legion Highway and crosses north of several bodies of water through Fall River. After intersecting with Tickle Road, the highway curves to the southeast and into a short stretch of residents through the hamlet of Brownell Corner. After the intersection with Sanford Road, Route 177 curves to the northeast once again. Just northeast of Brownwell Corner, the highway enters a diamond interchange with Route 88 before entering Westport. Through Westport, Route 177 turns northeastward once again, but remains rather wooded until the intersection with Forge Road, where it becomes residential once again. The route intersects with Beeden Road then merges into the right-of-way of U.S. Route 6 in Westport. This serves as the eastern terminus of the Massachusetts segment of Route 177.

== Major intersections ==
State	County	Location	mi	km	Destinations	Notes
Rhode Island	Newport	Tiverton	0.0	0.0	Route 77 (Main Road)	Western terminus
Rhode Island	Newport	Tiverton	2.9	4.7	Route 81 (Stafford Road / Crandall Road)	
Rhode Island–Massachusetts state line			3.5 0.0	5.6 0.0	Route transition	
Massachusetts	Bristol	Westport	3.1	5.0	Route 88 – Westport, North Westport	Diamond interchange
Massachusetts	Bristol	Dartmouth	4.9	7.9	US 6 – Cape Cod, Fall River	Eastern terminus
1.000 mi = 1.609 km; 1.000 km = 0.621 mi: Route transition
