= Rhode Island Route 81 =

State highway in Newport County, Rhode Island, US

Route 81
- Route 81 highlighted in red

Route information
- Maintained by RIDOT
- Length: 8.0 mi (12.9 km)

Major junctions
- South end: Route 179 in Little Compton
- Route 177 in Tiverton
- North end: Route 81 in Fall River, MA

Location
- Country: United States
- State: Rhode Island
- Counties: Newport

Highway system
- Rhode Island Routes
← Route 78	→ I-84

Route 81 is a numbered state highway running 8.0 miles (12.9 km) in Rhode Island. Route 81's southern terminus is at Rhode Island Route 179 in Little Compton and the northern terminus is a continuation as Massachusetts Route 81 near Fall River, Massachusetts.

== Major intersections ==
The entire route is in Newport County.

Location	mi	km	Destinations	Notes
Little Compton	0.0	0.0	Route 179 west (Main Street)	Southern terminus; eastern end of Route 179
Tiverton	5.2	8.4	Route 177 (Bulgarmarsh Road)	
Tiverton	8.0	12.9	Route 81 north – Fall River	Continuation into Massachusetts
1.000 mi = 1.609 km; 1.000 km = 0.621 mi
