= Ruby Devol Finch =

American female artist (1804–1866)

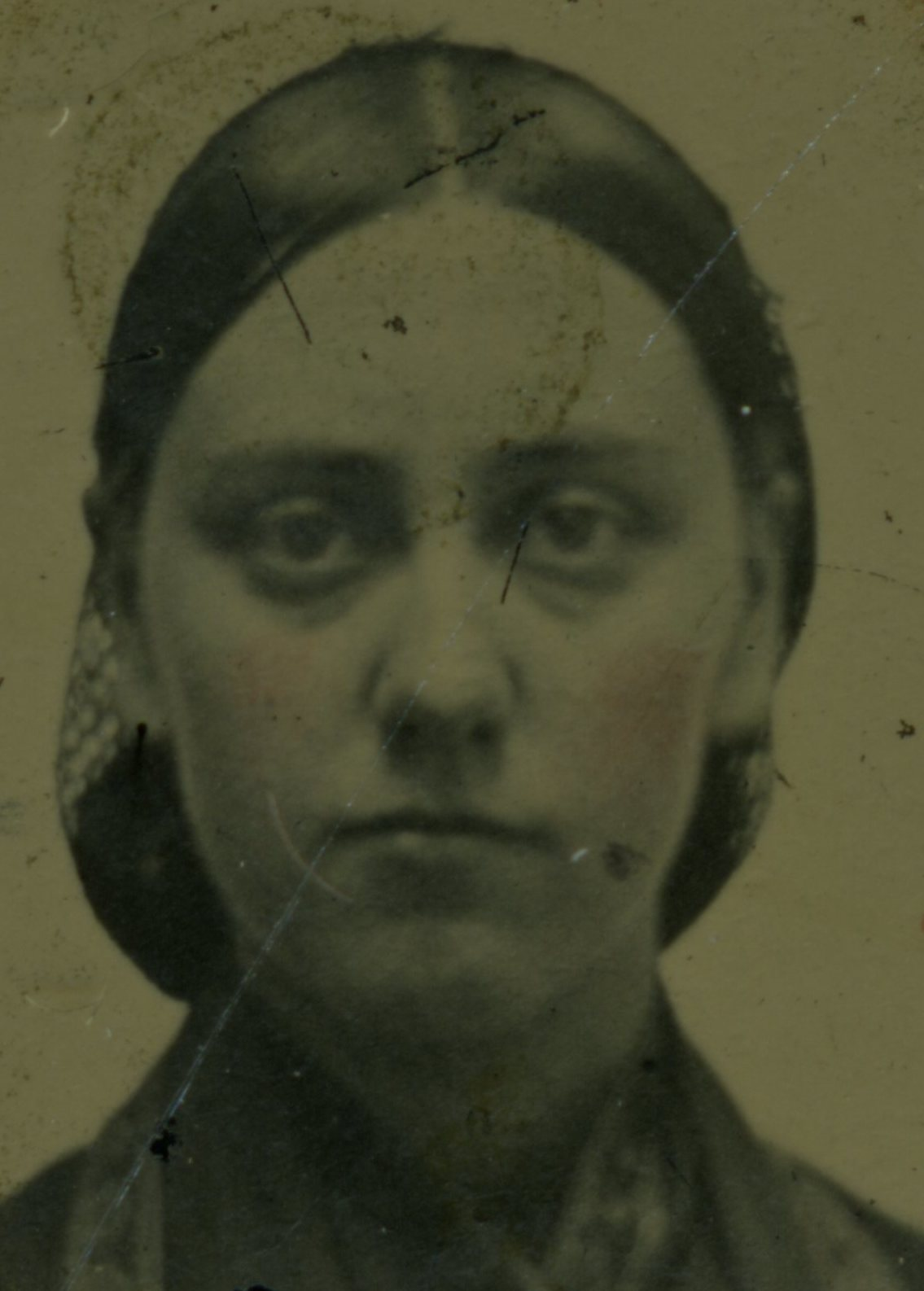
- Portrait photograph of Ruby Devol Finch, 1860.
- Born: Aruba Brownell Devol; November 20, 1804; Westport, Massachusetts, U.S.
- Died: July 7, 1866 (aged 61); New Bedford, Massachusetts, U.S.
- Burial place: Westport, Massachusetts, U.S.

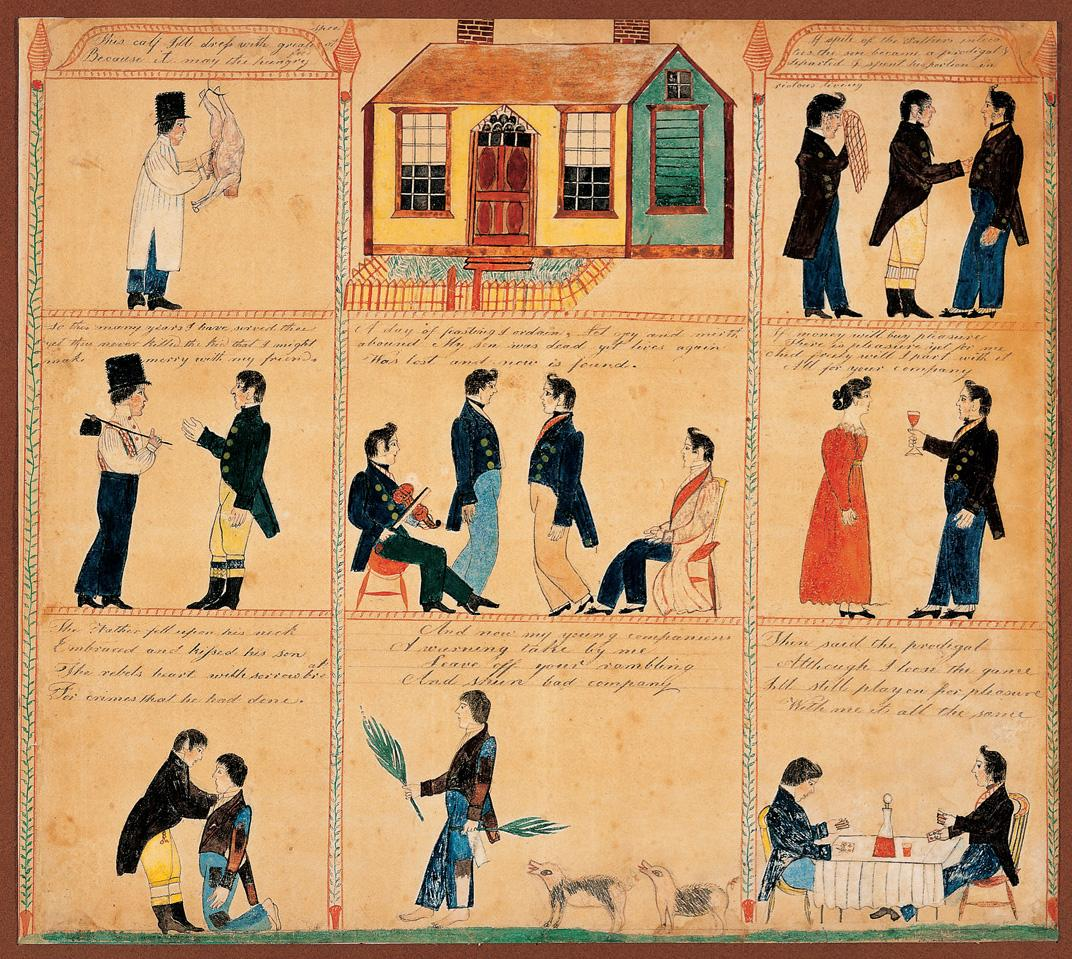
The Prodigal Son, c. 1830–1835, watercolor in the collection of the American Folk Art Museum

Aruba "Ruby" Brownell Devol Finch, better known as Ruby Devol Finch (November 20, 1804 – July 7, 1866) was an American folk artist.

== Biography ==
Finch was born Aruba Brownell Devol in Westport, Massachusetts, the daughter of Benjamin Devol, Jr. and Elizabeth Rounds. She was the younger of two sisters; previous reporting erroneously described her as one of seven children. Nothing of her education is known. In 1831 she produced a family register for her neighbor Silas Kirby. The following year, on November 8, she married William T. Finch of New Bedford. Five years before her marriage, she gave birth to her only child, Judith, whose father was unknown and who later married mason Otis Pierce. William Finch died at an unknown time; Ruby is known to have been widowed at the time of her death in New Bedford from a tumor. It appears at the time that she was living with her widowed mother. Her death record indicates that she was buried in Westport.

For many years, the only works known by Finch, besides the Kirby family register, were a series of half- and full-length portraits as well as two serial illustrations of the parable of the Prodigal Son. All are in watercolor, and evince a willingness to experiment; her portraits, especially, are distinguished by their individualistic details of costume and physical characteristics. She valued decorative qualities, and tended to avoid repetition; even repeated motifs are delineated by their varied poses. Her portraits incorporate plinths among their compositional devices. More recently, four more drawings were discovered among the effects from two former Devol family farms; also discovered was the only known photograph of Finch, taken six years before her death. Most of her work appears to have been produced to commemorate marriages or deaths, among other such personal occasions. Finch appears to have been accepted by her neighbors as a community artist, and many of her pieces depict neighbors and friends.

Finch's depiction of the tale of The Prodigal Son, dated c. 1830–1835, is owned by the American Folk Art Museum. The Abby Aldrich Rockefeller Folk Art Museum owns her double portrait of Mr. and Mrs. Elijah Robinson. The Westport Historical Society owns her photograph and her portrait of Ann Potter. The New Bedford Whaling Museum owns her portraits of Sally Allen and Tillinghast Tripp.
