= Massachusetts Route 81 =

State highway in Bristol County, Massachusetts, US

Route 81
- Route 81 highlighted in red

Route information
- Maintained by MassDOT
- Length: 2.61 mi (4.20 km)

Major junctions
- South end: Route 81 at the Rhode Island state line in Fall River
- Route 24 in Fall River
- North end: I-195 / Plymouth Avenue in Fall River

Location
- Country: United States
- State: Massachusetts
- Counties: Bristol

Highway system
- Massachusetts State Highway System; Interstate; US; State
← Route 80	→ Route 83

Route 81 is a short 2.61-mile-long (4.20 km) south–north state highway located entirely within the city of Fall River, Massachusetts. It begins as a continuation of Rhode Island Route 81 and ends at an interchange with I-195.

== History ==
Prior to the 1960s, much of what is now William S. Canning Boulevard did not exist, as the route passes through former wetlands around the Sucker Brook. The building of Route 24 helped necessitate its building, and also brought about the rise of the retail areas by 1971. The building of the route also lessened traffic on Stafford Road, which had been the only road to access what is now Route 81 in Rhode Island.

== Route description ==
The route is a continuation of Rhode Island Route 81, which extends from Adamsville along the Rhode Island-Massachusetts border. The route begins as William S. Canning Boulevard shortly before its intersection with Route 24 at that route's Exit 1. Form there it proceeds northward, past the SouthCoast Marketplace (formerly the New Harbour Mall) and Fall River Shopping Center. The road becomes Rhode Island Avenue when it crosses Tucker Street, keeping that designation for 0.4 miles (0.64 km) before turning into Plymouth Avenue at that road's intersection with Slade Street and Laurel Street. It then continues northward, passing Stafford Road, Middle Street and Rodman Street before finally ending at I-195 near the city's center.

== Major intersections ==
The entire route is in Fall River, Bristol County.

mi	km	Destinations	Notes
0.00	0.00	Route 81 south – Adamsville	Continuation into Rhode Island
0.30	0.48	Route 24 – Boston, Providence, RI, Tiverton, RI, Newport, RI	Cloverleaf interchange; exits 1A-B on Route 24
2.56	4.12	I-195 – New Bedford, Cape Cod, Providence, RI	Diamond interchange; exit 13 on I-195
2.56	4.12	Plymouth Avenue	Continuation north
1.000 mi = 1.609 km; 1.000 km = 0.621 mi
