= USS Westport =

USS Westport has been the name of more than one United States Navy ship, and may refer to:

- USS Westport (ID-2362), a hospital and ambulance boat commissioned in 1918, renamed USS Adrian five days after her acquisition
- USS Westport (ID-3548), a cargo ship in commission from 1918 to 1919
