= Horseneck Beach State Reservation =

Public recreation area in Westport, Massachusetts, US

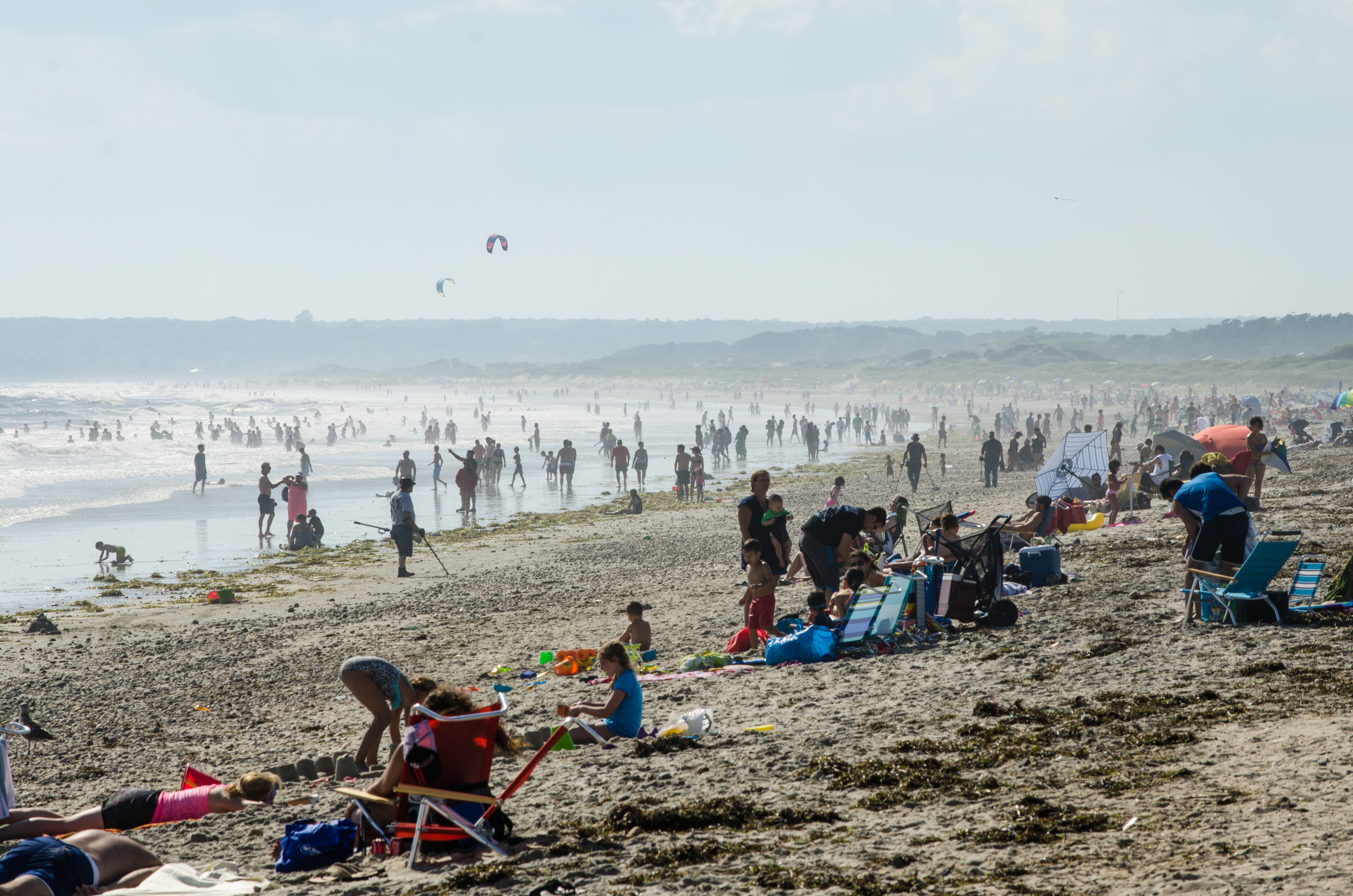
- Horseneck Beach in August 2015

- Location within Massachusetts Location within the United States
- Location: Westport, Massachusetts, United States
- Coordinates: 41°29′15″N 71°02′18″W
- Area: 815 acres (330 ha)
- Elevation: 13 ft (4.0 m)
- Established: 1956
- Administrator: Massachusetts Department of Conservation and Recreation
- Website: Official website

Horseneck Beach State Reservation is a public recreation area comprising more than 800 acres (320 ha) on the Atlantic Ocean in the southern portion of the town of Westport, Massachusetts. The reservation is one of the state’s "most popular facilities ... welcom[ing] hundreds of thousands of visitors per year." It is managed by the Massachusetts Department of Conservation and Recreation.

== Description ==
The reservation occupies a peninsula that juts out from Westport's mainland with Rhode Island Sound to the southwest and Buzzards Bay to the southeast. The reservation features 2 miles (3.2 km) of barrier beach, marshland, and a protected estuary habitat. Most of the marshland is concentrated at the northern portion of the peninsula bordering Horseneck Channel and The Let. The barrier island known as Gooseberry Neck (or Gooseberry Island) is connected by a causeway to the main peninsula and is the southernmost extension of Horseneck Beach State Reservation. It partially divides Rhode Island Sound from Buzzards Bay.

== History ==
The name Horse Neck is believed by some to derive from the Algonquin word hassanegk, meaning "a house made of stone although it may be that the long land mass resembles a horse's head." Summer homes were built in the area after a bridge connected the beach to Westport Point in 1893. After all but four homes were destroyed by hurricanes in 1938 and 1954, the state acquired Horseneck West Beach in 1956. Gooseberry Neck was added to the state's holdings in 1957. which also previously had summer homes.

== Activities and amenities ==
The state reservation offers fishing, windsurfing, motorized and non-motorized boating with boat ramp, trails for biking and walking, showers, hunting, and bird watching. The beach is located along the southern portion of the peninsula, bordering Rhode Island Sound and Buzzards Bay. Restroom facilities, management office, food bar, designated on-duty lifeguard towers, and paved walkways are found alongside the beach. A 100-site campground is located behind the dunes at Gooseberry Neck, at the eastern end of the reservation.

== Accessibility ==
The state reservation is accessible from the Bascule Bridge via Route 88, an offshoot of Interstate 195. Route 88 is the main (and direct) route of the two land routes to Horseneck. Route 88 ends on Horseneck, where John Reed Road, the main road serving the reservation, begins. John Reed Road ends at East Beach Road on the eastern portion of the peninsula. The other land route to Horseneck is East Beach Road via Horseneck Road, on the peninsula's connector, near the Westport/Dartmouth town boundary. The beach is accessible from the several large, designated parking lots via toll gates.
