= Gooseberry Island (Massachusetts) =

- Island
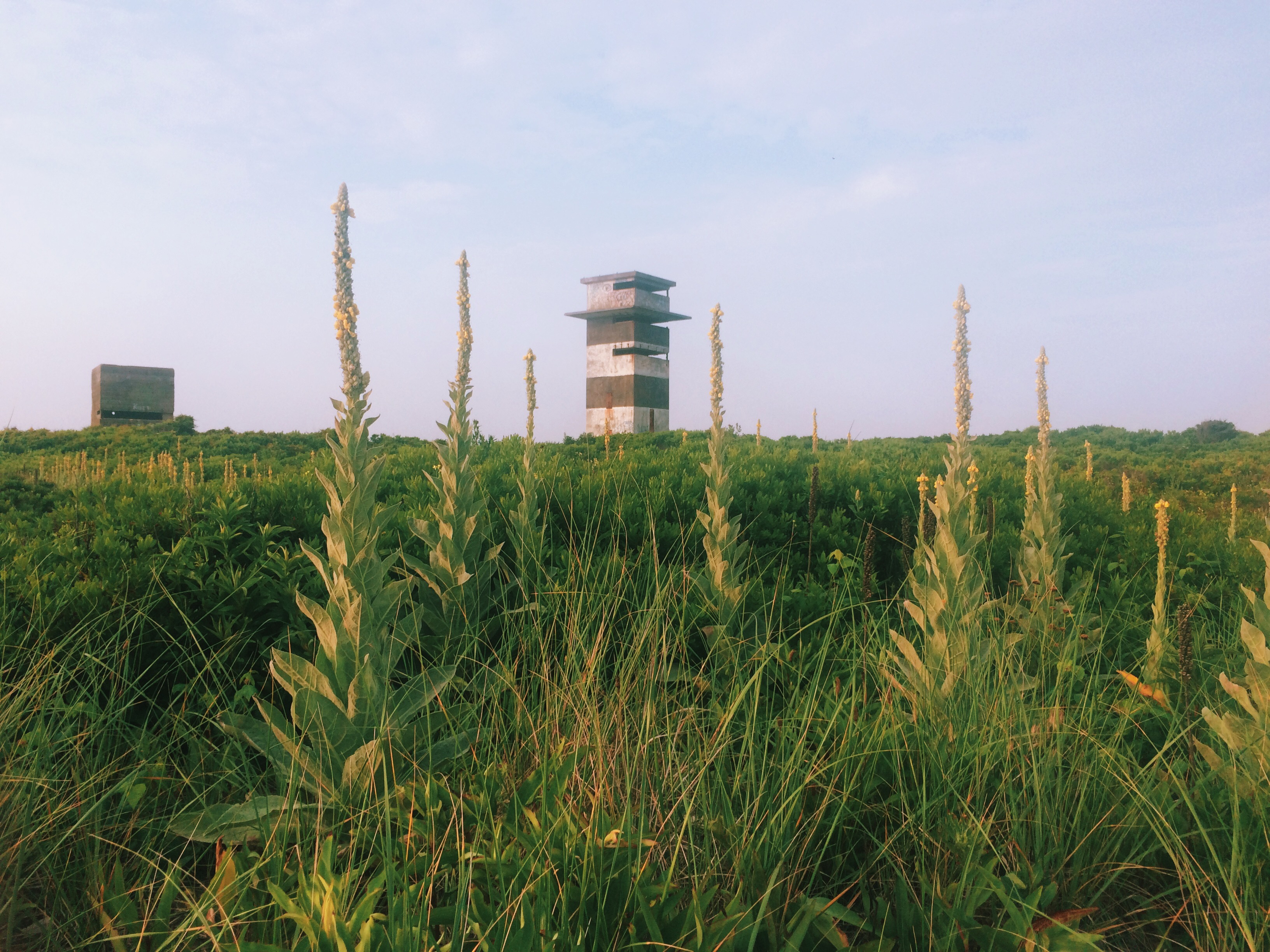
- World War II submarine watchtower on Gooseberry Island

- Location within Massachusetts
- Coordinates: 41°29′15″N 71°02′18″W
- Country: United States
- State: Massachusetts
- County: Bristol
- Town: Westport

Population (2010)
  - Total: 0
  - Density: 0/sq mi (0/km^{2})
- Time zone: UTC-5 (Eastern)
  - Summer (DST): UTC-4 (Eastern)
- ZIP code: 02790
- Area code: 508 / 774
- FIPS code: 25-77570
- GNIS feature ID: 0618287
- Website: http://www.westport-ma.com

Gooseberry Island (or Gooseberry Neck) is a small, historical island off the coast of Westport in Bristol County, Massachusetts, United States. The island is a part of Westport, and is the town's most southern point.

== Demographics ==
Gooseberry Island was uninhabited as of the 2010 census. The island used to have many residents, especially during the summer months, until Hurricane Carol destroyed most homes on the island in 1954.

== Geography ==
Gooseberry Island is the Town of Westport's most southern point and is located off the shores of Westport, between Horseneck Beach and East Beach. A road causeway connects the main part of Westport with Gooseberry Island. The island is only 0.17 miles (0.27 km) from the mainland of Westport. The island is also only 6.56 miles (10.55 km) northwest of Cuttyhunk Island in the Elizabeth Islands chain.
