= Rhode Island Route 179 =

State highway in Newport County, Rhode Island, US

Route 179
- Route 179 highlighted in red

Route information
- Maintained by RIDOT
- Length: 3.5 mi (5.6 km)
- Existed: May 1962–present

Major junctions
- West end: Route 77 in Tiverton
- East end: Route 81 in Little Compton

Location
- Country: United States
- State: Rhode Island
- Counties: Newport

Highway system
- Rhode Island Routes
← Route 177	→ I-184

Route 179 is a 3.53-mile-long (5.68 km) state highway in the U.S. state of Rhode Island. Route 179 is a short connector between Route 77 and Route 81 which are the two main roads in Tiverton and Little Compton. The Eastern terminus of Route 179 also serves as the southern terminus for Route 81.

== Route description ==
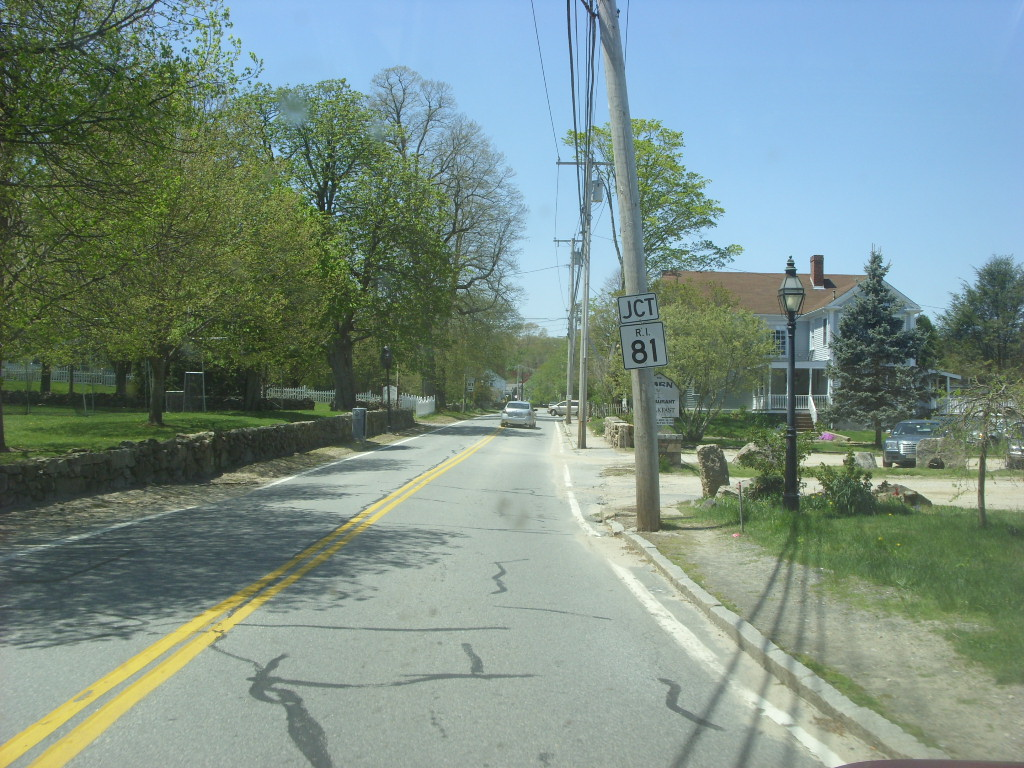
Route 179 approaching the intersection with Route 81 in Little Compton

Route 179 begins at an intersection with Route 77 (Main Road) in the Nonquit Pond area of Tiverton, Rhode Island. Route 179 progresses eastward as East Road through a residential neighborhood until the intersection with Eight Rod Way, where the alignment shifts to the southeast. Curving in several directions, Route 179 enters a busier neighborhood at the intersection with Lake Road. Just after Lake Road, the designation changes alignments at a fork, becoming part of Stone Church Road, instead of East Road, which continues straight towards Route 81. Route 179 turns to the southeast, passing homes and a large field before entering the neighborhood of Adamsville. At the intersection with Colebrook Road in Adamsville, Route 179 turns eastward and changes names once again this time to Main Street. Passing a short residential stretch, Route 179 intersects with Route 81 (Crandall Road), where both Route 179 and Route 81 terminate. Main Street continues eastward a short distance to the Massachusetts state line.

== Major intersections ==
The entire route is in Newport County.

Location	mi	km	Destinations	Notes
Tiverton	0.0	0.0	Route 77 (Main Road)	Western terminus
Little Compton	3.5	5.6	Route 81 north (Crandall Road)	Eastern terminus, southern terminus of Route 81
1.000 mi = 1.609 km; 1.000 km = 0.621 mi

== See also ==
- Route 177 (Rhode Island – Massachusetts)
