= Allen Levrault =

American baseball player (born 1977)

- Pitcher
- Born: August 15, 1977 (age 48); Fall River, Massachusetts, U.S.
- Batted: Right Threw: Right

MLB debut
- June 13, 2000, for the Milwaukee Brewers

Last MLB appearance
- June 27, 2003, for the Florida Marlins

MLB statistics
- Win–loss record: 7–11
- Earned run average: 5.59
- Strikeouts: 110
- Stats at Baseball Reference

Teams
- Milwaukee Brewers (2000–2001); Florida Marlins (2003)

Allen Harry Levrault (born August 15, 1977) is an American former Major League Baseball pitcher for the Milwaukee Brewers and Florida Marlins. He was drafted by the Milwaukee Brewers in the 13th round of the 1996 Major League Baseball draft.

Levrault graduated from Westport High School in Westport, Massachusetts in 1995.

In 2002 Levrault played for the Oakland Athletics Triple-A affiliate the Sacramento River Cats.

In 2003, he pitched in 19 games for the World Champions Florida Marlins. He went 1–0 with a 3.86 ERA with 15 walks and 21 strikeouts. He pitched in his final major league game on June 27, 2003.

In 2004, Levrault played for the Seattle Mariners' Double-A affiliate, the San Antonio Missions. He last played in 2005, for the independent Elmira Pioneers and Joliet Jackhammers.

Allen in 2001 was featured in A Player to be Named Later, a documentary about the life of a Triple-A ball player who played for the Milwaukee Brewers affiliate at the time the Indianapolis Indians.

Allen was married on September 5, 2009, to Vanessa Joy Quirk Levrault of Swansea, Massachusetts. They currently reside in Westport, Massachusetts with their son and daughter.
