= Westport Point Historic District =

Historic district in Massachusetts, United States

- U.S. National Register of Historic Places
- U.S. Historic district
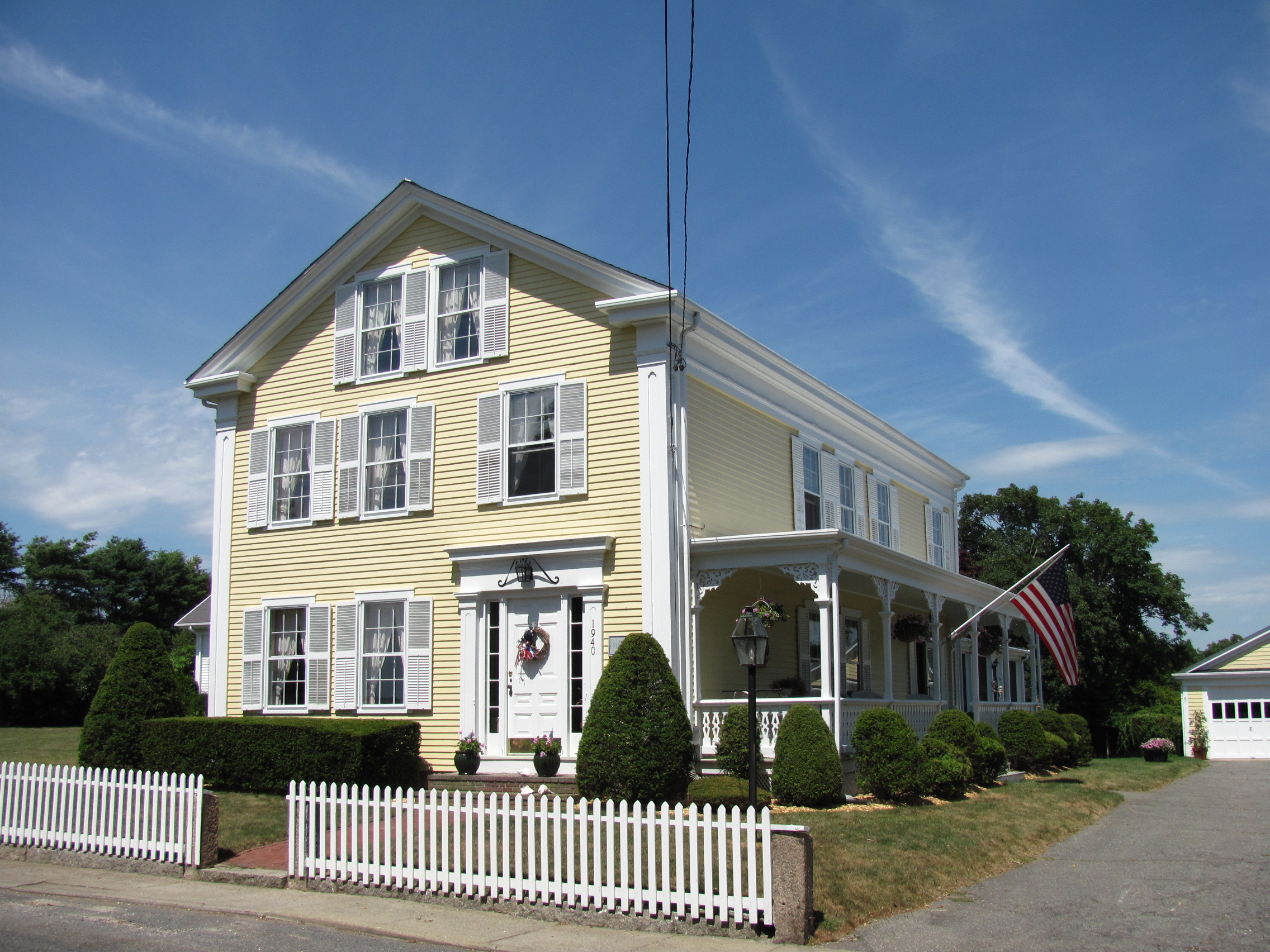
- Captain James W. Manchester House

- Location within Massachusetts Location within the United States
- Location: Westport, Massachusetts
- Coordinates: 41°31′24″N 71°4′29″W
- Area: 86 acres (35 ha)
- Architectural style: Late 19th and 20th Century Revivals, Greek Revival, Late Victorian
- NRHP reference No.: 92000815
- Added to NRHP: June 25, 1992

The Westport Point Historic District is a historic district encompassing an early coastal village in Westport, Massachusetts. Set at the confluence of two branches of the tidal Westport River, the village has a rich architectural history from the late 18th century to the early 20th. The district was added to the National Register of Historic Places in 1992.

== Description and history ==
The area that is now Westport, Massachusetts was originally part of neighboring Dartmouth, separating in 1787. One of the area's earliest settlements was on the barrier island at the mouth of the Westport River, with the point between its two branches developed as an agricultural area, with a ferry between the two established in 1712. The point's potential for additional housing and maritime services resulted in significant development beginning around 1770. Over the next 100 or so years, the area developed as a center of coastal shipping and the outfitting of ships that were typically built at shipyards further upriver. Little of the maritime infrastructure associated with these activities has survived. After the American Civil War, and with the decline in demand for wooden ships, the area's economic focus changed to one as a seaside resort and vacation area.

The historic district extends along Main Road, the principal historic thoroughfare on the point prior to the construction of Massachusetts Route 88 in the 1960s. The district extends linearly along Main Road for about a mile, ending roughly at Charles Street. Although a number of side streets emanate from this spine, only properties on Valentine's Lane and Cape Bial Lane are also included in the district. The district is 86 acres (35 ha) in size, with 173 historically significant buildings. Most of these are one and two-story wood frame houses; there is only one commercial building, the c. 1840 Cory Store, and one church, the Westport Point Methodist Church (1884, Gothic Revival). The most common architectural style found is the Greek Revival, whose height of fashion in the area was between 1835 and 1860.

== See also ==
- National Register of Historic Places listings in Bristol County, Massachusetts
