= Rhode Island Route 51 =

State highway in Rhode Island, US

Route 51
- Phenix Avenue
- Route 51 highlighted in red

Route information
- Maintained by RIDOT
- Length: 5.4 mi (8.7 km)

Major junctions
- South end: Route 115 in West Warwick
- North end: Route 12 in Cranston

Location
- Country: United States
- State: Rhode Island
- Counties: Kent, Providence

Highway system
- Rhode Island Routes
← US 44	→ Route 77

Route 51 is a state highway in the U.S. state of Rhode Island. It runs approximately 5.4 miles (8.7 km) from Route 115 in West Warwick to Route 12 in Cranston.

== Route description ==
Route 51 starts at an intersection with Route 115 in West Warwick. It runs northward through residential areas before skirting the Cranston Country Club. It continues north, passes over I-295 without an exit, and ends at Route 12 in Cranston.

Route 51 is the only Rhode Island state highway that does not have any state-maintained sections. Also, many maps do not show the correct route for Route 51. Generally, maps which show Route 51 at all show it starting at Route 37 on Natick Avenue, then heading along Natick Avenue and Phenix Avenue, ending at Route 12. This route is incorrect according to RIDOT, whose pavement management log shows Route 51 starting at Route 115; it comes close to Route 37 but does not intersect it.

Also of note is that there is no Route 51 signage on Route 51 itself, though there are two blank sign posts that may have carried Route 51 shields at some point, and on Interstate 295, signage for exit 3B clearly stated RI 51. Those signs were all replaced in 2008 and the new signs show only RI 37, all reference to RI 51 on I-295 has been removed. According to RIDOT, the towns through which Route 51 runs requested that the signs be removed to give them time to prepare for the increase in traffic brought by a numbered route. There are also some trailblazer assemblies along Route 5 and Route 12.

== Major intersections ==
County	Location	mi	km	Destinations	Notes
Kent	West Warwick	0.0	0.0	Route 115 (Main Street)	Southern terminus
Providence	Cranston	3.8	6.1	Natick Avenue to Route 37	
Providence	Cranston	5.4	8.7	Route 12 (Scituate Avenue)	Northern terminus
1.000 mi = 1.609 km; 1.000 km = 0.621 mi
