= Rhode Island Route 77 =

State highway in Newport County, Rhode Island, US

Route 77
- Route 77 highlighted in red

Route information
- Maintained by RIDOT
- Length: 14.3 mi (23.0 km)

Major junctions
- South end: Rhode Island Road in Little Compton
- Route 179 in Tiverton; Route 177 in Tiverton
- North end: Route 24 / Route 138 in Tiverton

Location
- Country: United States
- State: Rhode Island
- Counties: Newport

Highway system
- Rhode Island Routes
← Route 51	→ Route 78

Route 77 is a state highway in the U.S. state of Rhode Island. It runs approximately 14 miles (23 km) from Rhode Island Road in Little Compton to Route 24 in Tiverton.

== Route description ==
Route 77 starts at Rhode Island Road in southern Little Compton. It runs in a northerly direction and intersects Route 179. Continuing north past Route 177, Route 77 passes through downtown Tiverton. It continues north, directly paralleling the Sakonnet River, until it reaches its northern terminus at Route 24.

== History ==
The section of Route 77 between Route 179 and Route 177 was part of Route 126 until May 1962, which now runs through the Blackstone Valley.

== Major intersections ==
The entire route is in Newport County.

Location	mi	km	Destinations	Notes
Little Compton	0.0	0.0	Rhode Island Road	Southern terminus
Tiverton	8.6	13.8	Route 179 east (East Road) – Adamsville	Western terminus of Route 179
Tiverton	11.8	19.0	Route 177 east (Bulgarmarsh Road) – New Bedford, MA	Western terminus of Route 177
Tiverton	14.3	23.0	Route 24 / Route 138 (Main Road) – Newport, Boston, MA, Cape Cod, North Tiverton	Northern terminus; exit 4 on Route 24/Route 138
1.000 mi = 1.609 km; 1.000 km = 0.621 mi
