= SS Westport =

A number of steamships were named Westport, including –

- SS Westport (1911), an American passenger ship in service 1911–18 and from 1919
- SS Westport (1918), an American cargo ship in service 1919–41
- SS Westport (1943), an American tanker in service 1948–54
