= North Westport, Massachusetts =

- Census-designated place
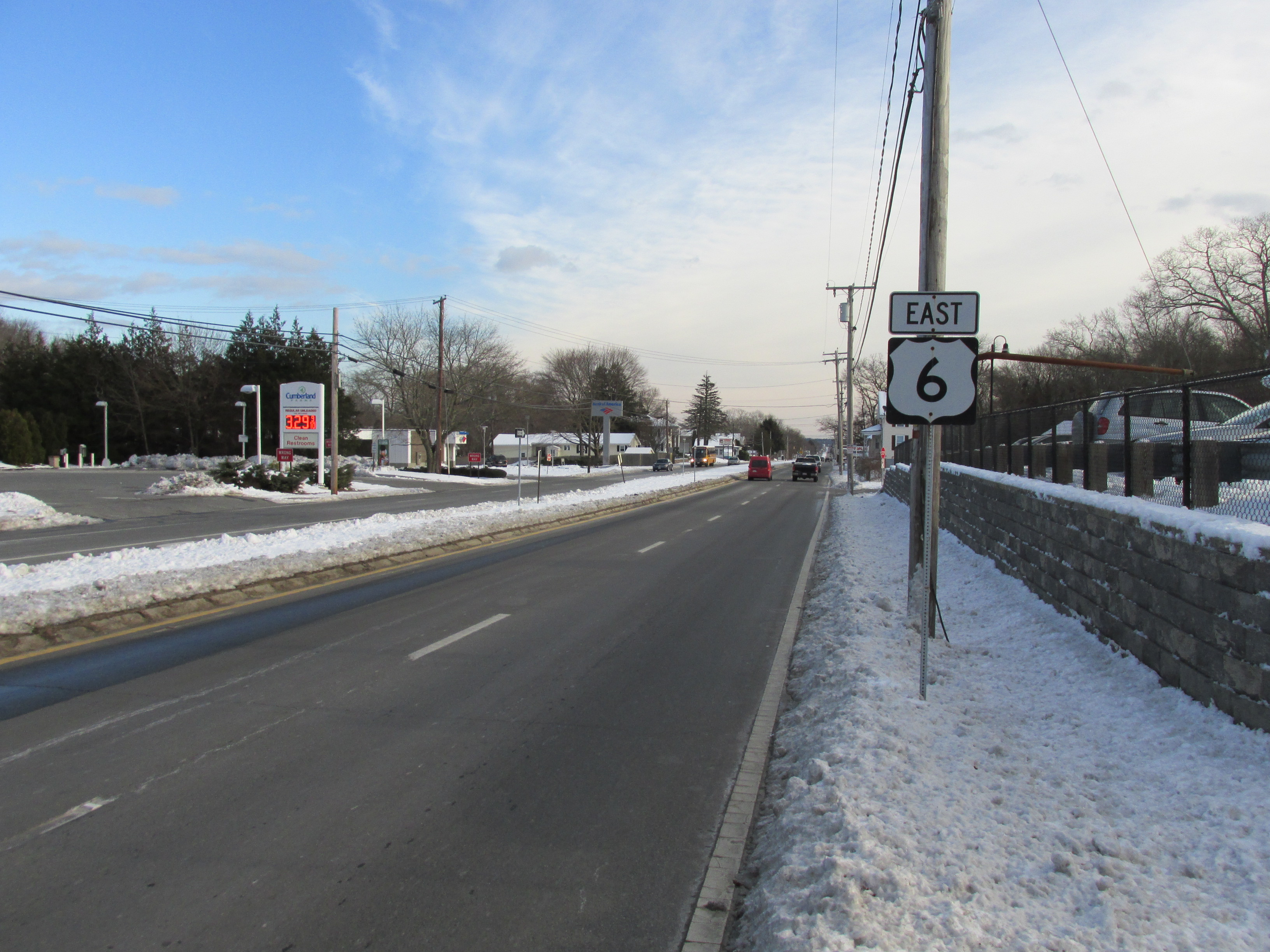
- US Route 6 eastbound

- Location in Bristol County in Massachusetts
- Coordinates: 41°39′38″N 71°5′18″W
- Country: United States
- State: Massachusetts
- County: Bristol
- Town: Westport

Area
  - Total: 6.18 sq mi (16.00 km^{2})
  - Land: 5.19 sq mi (13.44 km^{2})
  - Water: 0.99 sq mi (2.56 km^{2})
- Elevation: 138 ft (42 m)

Population (2020)
  - Total: 4,720
  - Density: 909.5/sq mi (351.16/km^{2})
- Time zone: UTC-5 (Eastern (EST))
  - Summer (DST): UTC-4 (EDT)
- ZIP Code: 02790 (Westport)
- FIPS code: 25-49710
- GNIS feature ID: 1867310

North Westport is a census-designated place (CDP) in the town of Westport, Massachusetts, United States. As of the 2020 census, North Westport had a population of 4,720.

== Geography ==
North Westport is located at 41°39′38″N 71°5′18″W (41.660495, -71.088407).

According to the United States Census Bureau, the CDP has a total area of 15.9 km^{2} (6.2 mi^{2}), of which 13.4 km^{2} (5.2 mi^{2}) is land and 2.5 km^{2} (1.0 mi^{2}) (15.61%) is water.

== Demographics ==
Historical population
Census	Pop.	Note	%±
2020	4,720		—
U.S. Decennial Census

=== 2020 census ===
As of the 2020 census, North Westport had a population of 4,720. The median age was 47.7 years. 16.2% of residents were under the age of 18 and 23.1% of residents were 65 years of age or older. For every 100 females there were 97.9 males, and for every 100 females age 18 and over there were 96.2 males age 18 and over.

100.0% of residents lived in urban areas, while 0.0% lived in rural areas.

There were 1,991 households in North Westport, of which 24.1% had children under the age of 18 living in them. Of all households, 50.3% were married-couple households, 16.5% were households with a male householder and no spouse or partner present, and 24.7% were households with a female householder and no spouse or partner present. About 25.3% of all households were made up of individuals and 12.9% had someone living alone who was 65 years of age or older.

There were 2,082 housing units, of which 4.4% were vacant. The homeowner vacancy rate was 1.2% and the rental vacancy rate was 0.8%.

Racial composition as of the 2020 census
Race	Number	Percent
White	4,433	93.9%
Black or African American	15	0.3%
American Indian and Alaska Native	8	0.2%
Asian	44	0.9%
Native Hawaiian and Other Pacific Islander	1	0.0%
Some other race	44	0.9%
Two or more races	175	3.7%
Hispanic or Latino (of any race)	88	1.9%

=== 2000 census ===
As of the 2000 census, there were 4,533 people, 1,742 households, and 1,299 families residing in the CDP. The population density was 337.2/km^{2} (873.9/mi^{2}). There were 1,806 housing units at an average density of 134.4/km^{2} (348.2/mi^{2}). The racial makeup of the CDP was 97.66% White, 0.24% African American, 0.09% Native American, 0.64% Asian, 0.02% Pacific Islander, 0.40% from other races, and 0.95% from two or more races. Hispanic or Latino of any race were 0.75% of the population.

There were 1,742 households, out of which 27.7% had children under the age of 18 living with them, 59.2% were married couples living together, 10.6% had a female householder with no husband present, and 25.4% were non-families. 21.2% of all households were made up of individuals, and 10.2% had someone living alone who was 65 years of age or older. The average household size was 2.60 and the average family size was 3.01.

In the CDP, the population was spread out, with 21.0% under the age of 18, 7.2% from 18 to 24, 28.4% from 25 to 44, 27.9% from 45 to 64, and 15.6% who were 65 years of age or older. The median age was 41 years. For every 100 females, there were 94.8 males. For every 100 females age 18 and over, there were 93.9 males.

The median income for a household in the CDP was $45,433, and the median income for a family was $55,881. Males had a median income of $40,532 versus $30,125 for females. The per capita income for the CDP was $20,790. About 3.4% of families and 6.7% of the population were below the poverty line, including 8.5% of those under age 18 and 9.0% of those age 65 or over.

== History ==
The village of North Westport, is the oldest village out of seven villages located in the town of Westport, Massachusetts. The village of North Westport and Westport Factory were the headquarters of the Westport Manufacturing Company which was established in 1854 on the banks of the east branch of the Westport River. The village had many schools, churches, offices, and stores, which provided many jobs for residents in the area at that time. The electric trolley services, which was built in 1894, connected the cities of Fall River and New Bedford as well as making stops at the factory and nearby Lincoln Park which was an amusement park that provided entertainment for people, especially in the summer months. The village went into decline during the mid to late 20th century, as the Westport Manufacturing Company went bankrupt and with the closing of Lincoln Park in 1987. Today, the village has become a quiet neighborhood and is still home to many small businesses and stores along U.S. Route 6.
