= Westport Airport =

Westport Airport may refer to:

- Westport Airport (New Zealand) in Westport, New Zealand (IATA: WSZ)
- Westport Airport (Kansas) in Wichita, Kansas, United States (FAA: 71K)
- Westport Airport (Oklahoma) in Westport, Oklahoma, United States (FAA: 4F1)
- Westport Airport (Washington) in Westport, Washington, United States (FAA: 14S)
