= Westport High School (Massachusetts) =

Location
- 400 Old County Rd; Westport, Massachusetts 02790; 41.6211°N 71.0803°W

Information
- School type: Public high school, middle school
- Status: Open
- School district: Westport Community Schools
- Principal: Laura Charette
- Grades: 5-12 (middle 5–8, high 9–12)
- Age range: 12-18 years old
- Language: English
- Hours in school day: 6 1/2
- Colors: Brown, white, and gold
- Athletics conference: Mayflower 4
- Mascot: Wildcat
- Team name: Westport Wildcats
- Rival: Bishop Connolly
- Communities served: Town of Westport
- Website: www.westportschools.org/schools/westport-high-school

Westport High School is located in Westport, Massachusetts, United States. It services students in grades 5–12. It is part of the Westport Community Schools.

== Notable alumni ==
- Black Francis (Class of 1983) frontman of the Pixies
- Allen Levrault (Class of 1995) Former professional baseball player (Milwaukee Brewers, Florida Marlins)
- Barbara Viera (Class of 1959) head coach of the Delaware Fightin' Blue Hens women's volleyball team
