= USS Adrian =

World War I American ship

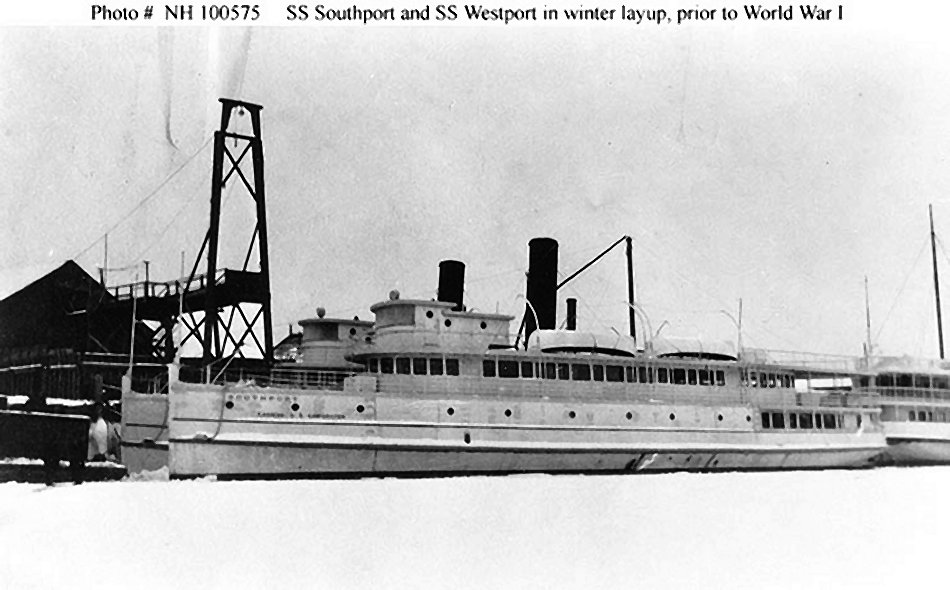
- Southport in winter layup, prior to World War I, with her sister ship, SS Westport tied up on her inboard side.

History

United States
- Builder: William McKie, East Boston, MA
- Launched: 1911
- Acquired: 14 November 1918
- Decommissioned: 19 September 1919
- Renamed: Adrian 19 November 1918
- Fate: Returned to her owner, the Eastern Steamship Lines, Inc., Boston, 29 September 1919

General characteristics
- Displacement: 330 t
- Length: 125 ft 7 in (38.28 m)
- Beam: 21 ft 2 in (6.45 m)
- Draft: 8 ft 5 in (2.57 m)
- Speed: 13.25 Knots
- Complement: 16

The wooden-hulled excursion steamer Westport was built in 1911 by William McKie of East Boston, MA., and owned by the Eastern Steamship Lines, Inc., of Boston India Wharf at the start of World War I. The Navy inspected the ship in the 1st Naval District on 1 February 1918 for possible use as a passenger and freight carrier, and she was taken over on 14 November 1918. Five days later, her name was changed to Adrian-to avoid confusion with the Naval Overseas Transportation Service (NOTS) freighter Westport (Id. No. 3548) - and, given the classification Id. No. 2362, was initially assigned to the 1st Naval District.

However, the 5th Naval District's pressing need for a "hospital and ambulance boat" soon resulted in orders sending the ship to Norfolk, VA., ". . . for the purpose of furnishing treatment to personnel on vessels not otherwise provided for and for transporting cases to a hospital from vessels in Hampton Roads. " The services which Adrian could provide could be obtained by calling the 5th Naval District's Medical Aide during the day, and the district duty officer outside normal working hours.

Such prosaic duties were not without the threat of accidents. On the evening of 2 May 1919—while Adrian was making a trip from the Naval Hospital at Portsmouth, VA., to the Naval Operating Base, Norfolk—she blew a tube in her boiler. When it burst, live coals and escaping steam severely burned a sailor of her "black gang." A Navy tug took Adrian in tow, and the injured man was soon taken ashore at Portsmouth for treatment.

On 2 September, word came for Adrian to proceed via the "inside route" to the naval station at Boston, Mass., and report to the Commandant of the 1st Naval District. She was decommissioned there on 19 September 1919 and returned to her owner 10 days later.
