= Westport Middle School (Kentucky) =

Coordinates: 38°16′32.2″N 85°36′00.6″W

Location
- 8100 Westport Road, Louisville, KY 40242; Louisville, Kentucky 40242; United States

Information
- School type: Public middle school
- Established: 1961
- Status: Open
- School district: Jefferson County Public Schools
- Superintendent: Dr. Marty Pollio
- Grades: 6-8
- Age range: 11-15
- Language: English
- Colours: Blue and White
- Mascot: Warhawk
- Team name: Westport Warhawks
- Website: www.westportmiddle.com

Westport Middle School, formerly known as Westport High School, was founded in October, 1961 as Westport Road High School, on Westport Road on the East Side of Louisville, Kentucky. It serviced students from 7th through 12th grade, with its first class of seniors graduating in 1965. The last class of Seniors graduated in the Spring of 1981, and beginning in the Fall of that year, the school was re-organized as a middle school. Today it services students from 6th to 8th grade.. Westport offers the Montessori Magnet, Advanced Placement, and Honors Programs, as well as their behavioral places are B.R.T or PAC, I.S.S or ISAP.
