= Westport River =

River in Massachusetts, United States

Coordinates: 41.508°N 71.087°W

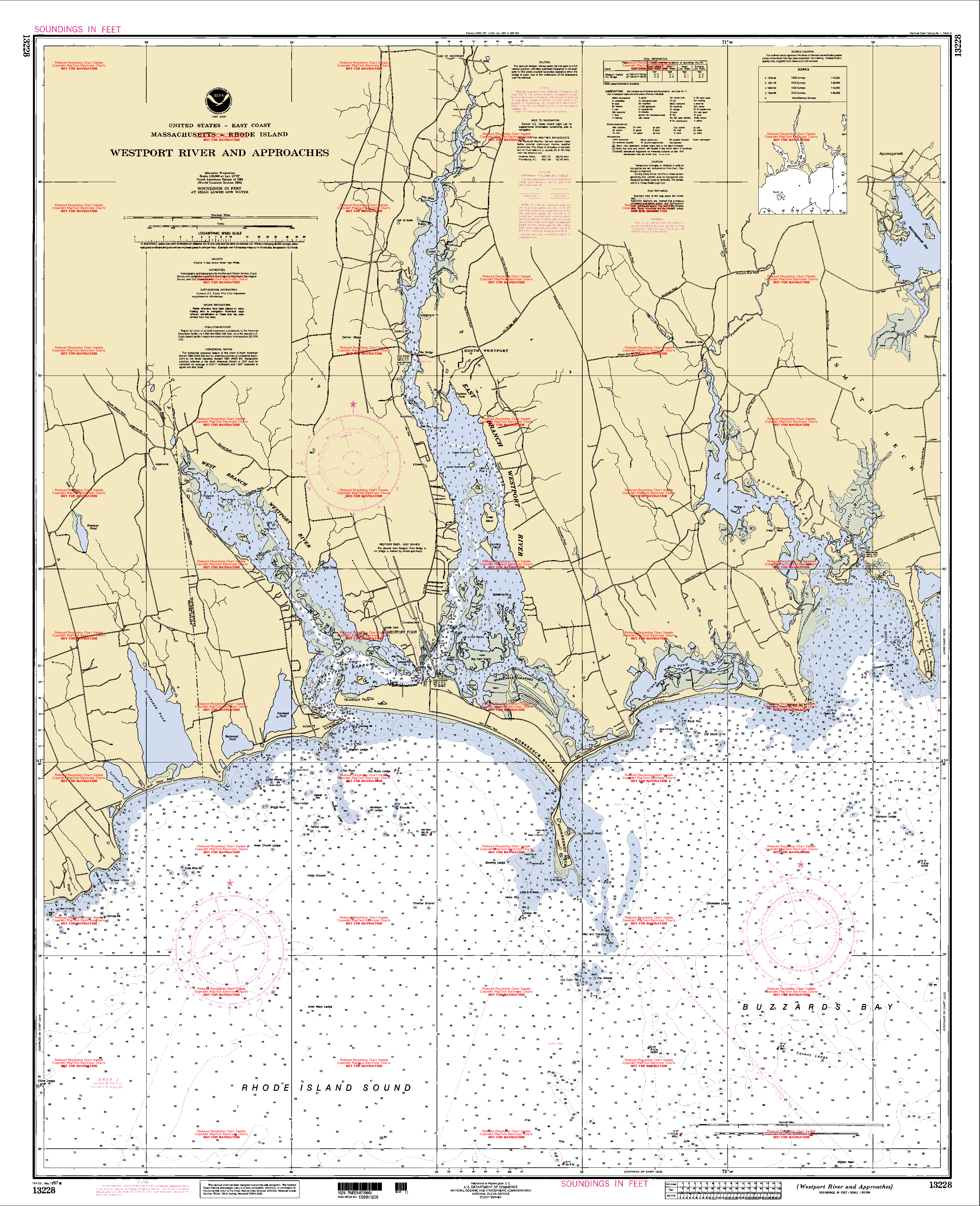
Westport River Map

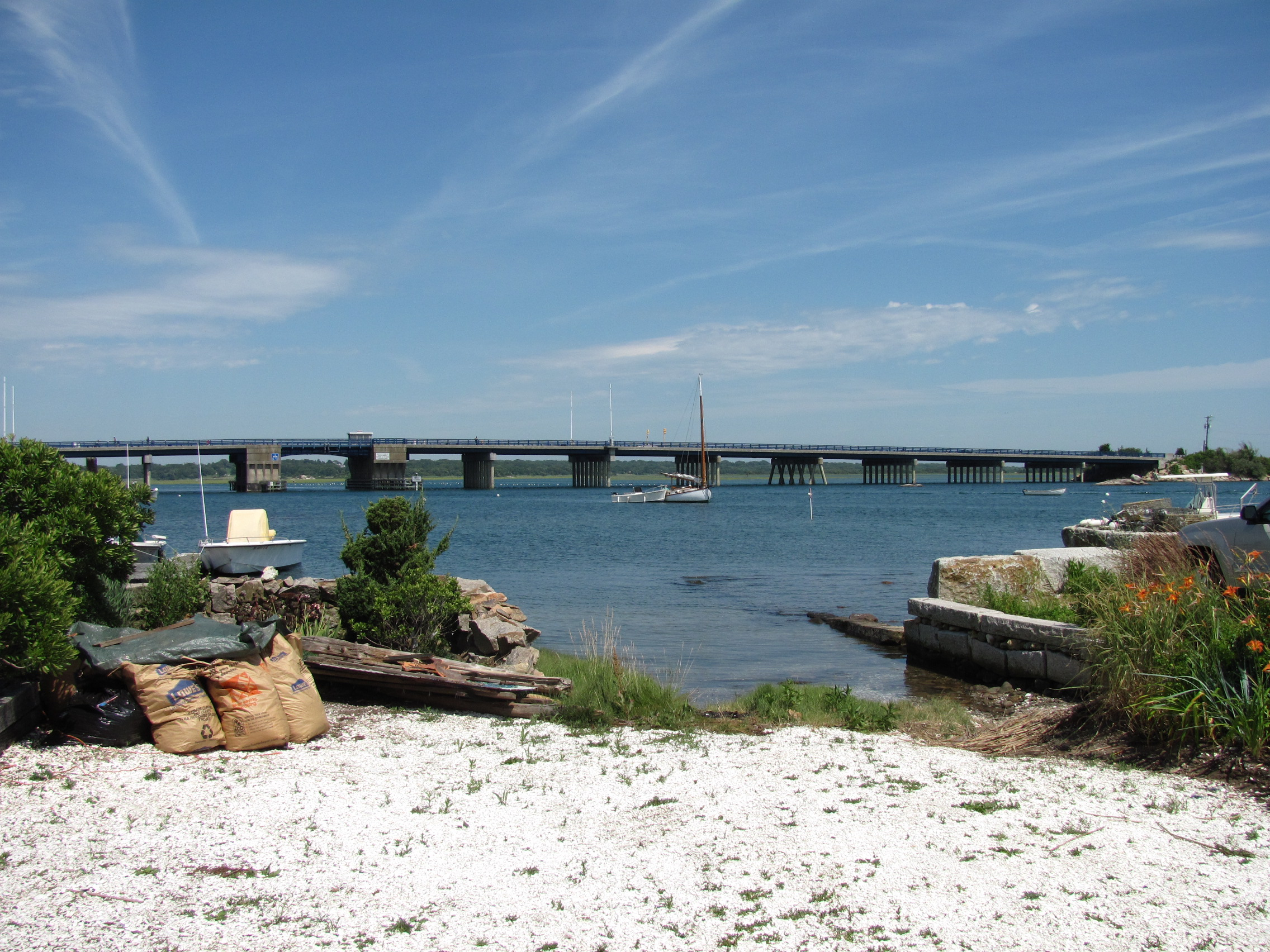
The East Branch flows under the Fontaine Bridge as it approaches the harbor

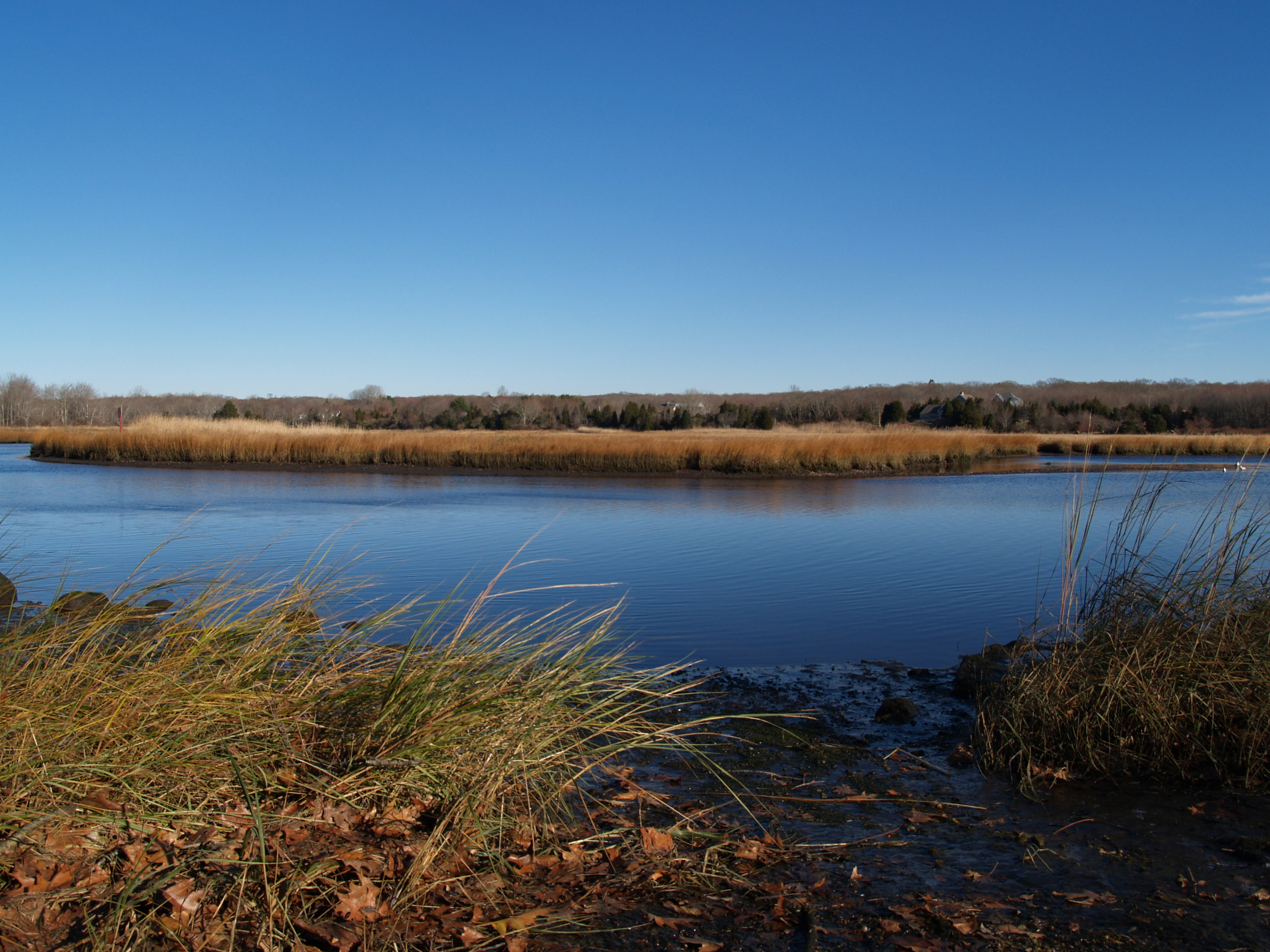
The WestBranch, near Adamsville

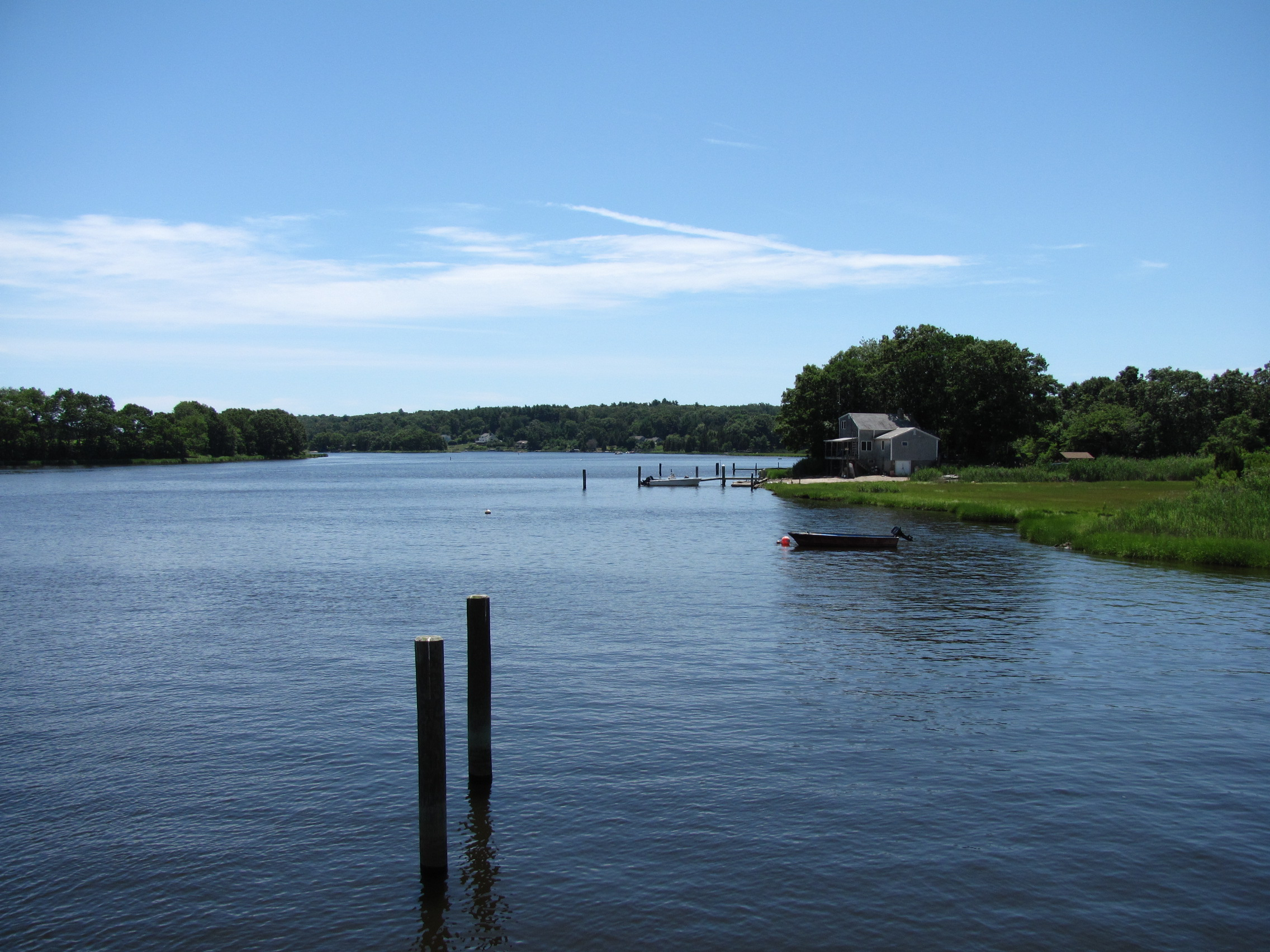
East Branch from Hix Bridge

The harbor mouth of the Westport River as the East and West Branches join to flow into the Rhode Island Sound

The Westport River lies between Narragansett Bay and Buzzards Bay in Westport, Massachusetts.

== Description ==
The Westport River has two branches. The smaller West Branch is approximately 7.0 miles (11.3 km) long, rising from a confluence of brooks near the village of Adamsville, Rhode Island. It flows in a southeastward direction, passing around several small islands before meeting Westport Harbor west of Westport Point. The West Branch separates the village of Acoaxet (pronounced "a-KOKE-sett") from the rest of the town; one has to pass into Rhode Island in order to reach the rest of Westport from there by land.

The larger East Branch is roughly 11.5 miles (18.5 km) long, rising at the town line of Westport and Dartmouth at Lake Noquochoke, which is fed mostly by the Copicut and Shingle Island rivers. After a short length the river meets the Bread and Cheese Brook before reaching the Head of Westport village, where the river widens and deepens. From here the river continues southward, being fed by several brooks before an initial widening to between 100-400 yards at Widows Point. From Widows Point, the river flows due southward, crossing under the Hix Bridge before passing Gull Rock and then widening at Cadman's Neck to approximately a half mile wide. The river flows southward, with several larger islands dotting the path, before meeting the Horseneck Channel (which in turn leads to The Let) at Westport Point. The East Branch then flows under the Normand Edward Fontaine Bridge and into Westport Harbor.

Once in Westport Harbor, the combined branches bend around Horseneck Point across from The Knubble before flowing into Rhode Island Sound, just west of Horseneck Beach State Reservation and the point where Rhode Island Sound meets Buzzards Bay.

== Wildlife ==
The Westport River estuary has long been known for its wildlife. Deer, coyotes, foxes, and turkeys can all be spotted at different times along the shore. Ospreys are very prevalent. There were 41 nesting sites confirmed in 1980. Now the population has spread to over 300 statewide, due to the Westport River estuary nesting program. MassWildlife continues to provide technical assistance to monitor a sample of the nesting population to determine productivity.
