= Westport, Massachusetts =

Town in Massachusetts, United States

Westport, Massachusetts Acoaxet
- Town
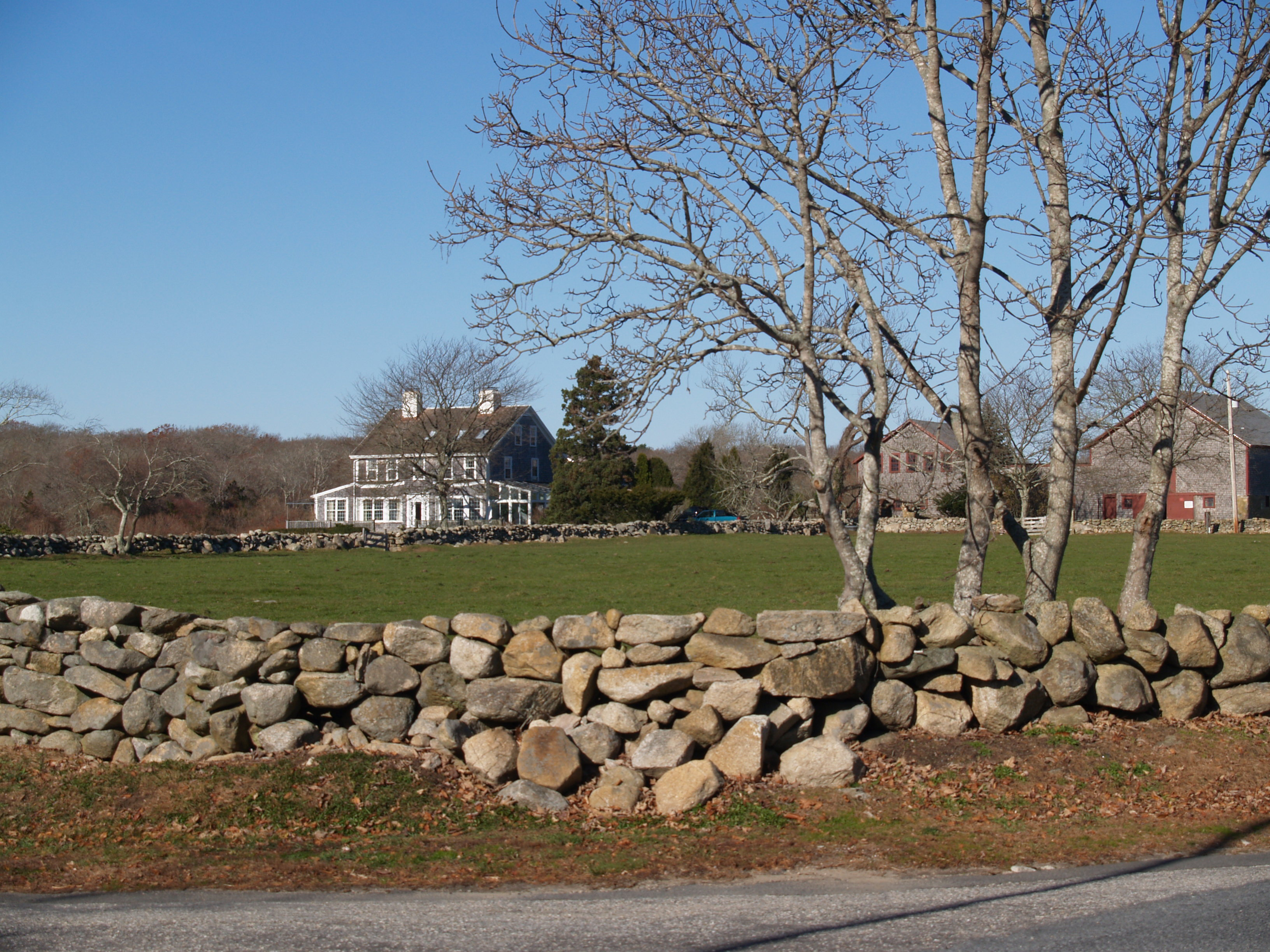
- Stone wall and field scene, Westport

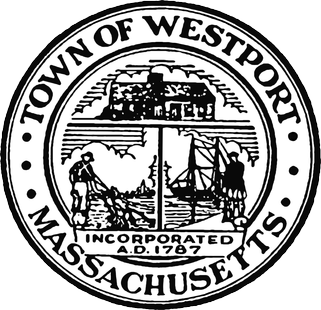
- Seal

- Location in Bristol County in Massachusetts
- Coordinates: 41°38′20″N 71°03′00″W
- Country: United States
- State: Massachusetts
- County: Bristol
- Settled: 1670
- Incorporated: 1787

Government
  - Type: Open town meeting

Area
  - Total: 64.4 sq mi (166.8 km^{2})
  - Land: 50.0 sq mi (129.6 km^{2})
  - Water: 14.3 sq mi (37.1 km^{2})
- Elevation: 49 ft (15 m)

Population (2020)
  - Total: 16,339
  - Density: 326.5/sq mi (126.1/km^{2})
- Time zone: UTC-5 (Eastern)
  - Summer (DST): UTC-4 (Eastern)
- ZIP Codes: 02790 (Westport); 02791 (Westport Point)
- Area code: 508 / 774
- FIPS code: 25-77570
- GNIS feature ID: 0618287
- Website: www.westport-ma.com

Westport (Massachusett: Acoaxet) is a town in Bristol County, Massachusetts, United States. The population was 16,339 at the 2020 census.

The village of North Westport lies in the town. Other named areas of the town are "Westport Point," which has a dock on the Westport River where Main Road meets the river; "Central Village" with town offices, retail stores and businesses; "Head of Westport" at the head of the east branch of the river; and the area referred to either as "Acoaxet" or "Westport Harbor," which is between the west branch of the river and Rhode Island. This area is cut off from the rest of Massachusetts by water and Rhode Island.

Westport is a part of the South Coast region of Massachusetts which encompasses the cities and towns that surround Buzzards Bay (excluding the Elizabeth Islands, Bourne and Falmouth), Mount Hope Bay and the Sakonnet River.

== History ==
Westport was so named because it was the westernmost port in the Massachusetts Bay Colony. It was first settled by English colonists of Plymouth Colony in 1670 as a part of Old Dartmouth by members of the Sisson family. The river, and the land around it, was called "Coaksett" in the original deed; the name, now spelled "Acoaxet," now refers to the southwestern community along the western branch of the Westport River.

Like many areas in the region, Westport was affected by Wampanoag raiding parties during King Philip's War. Several small mills were built along the Westport River, adding to its prosperity. In 1787, the growing town, along with the town of New Bedford, seceded from Dartmouth.

During the late 18th century and into the early 19th century, Paul Cuffee and his wife settled in the town. He was a Quaker businessman, sea captain, patriot, and abolitionist who developed a shipyard on the banks of the Westport River. Of Wampanoag and Ashanti ancestry, Cuffee became one of the richest free men of color in the United States at the time. He later helped the effort to resettle freed blacks to Sierra Leone in West Africa.

Several cotton mills operated along the river, the largest of which was at the junction of the river with Lake Noquochoke on the Dartmouth town line. The Macomber turnip traces its ancestry to seeds brought to Westport from the 1876 Centennial Exposition. During the Second World War, a coastal defense installation was raised on Gooseberry Island. The town is now mostly residential, with a large farming community. Horseneck Beach State Reservation, located to the north and west of Gooseberry Island, is a popular summer destination for many in the area.

== Geography ==
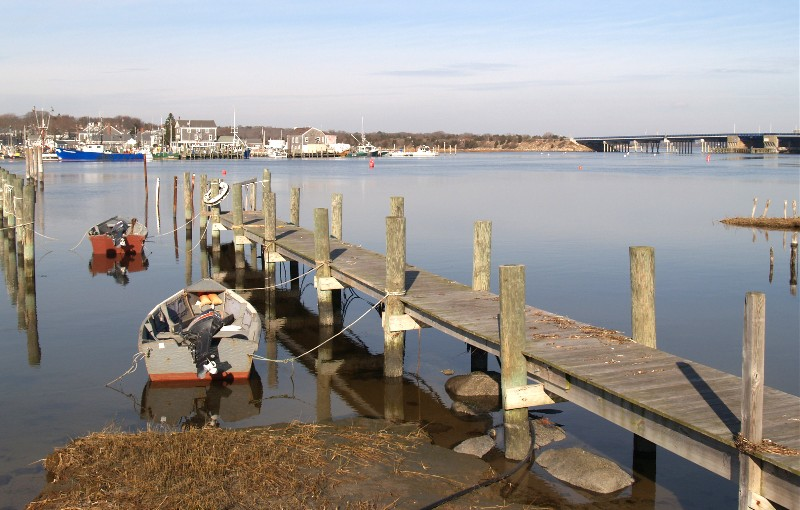
Westport River

According to the United States Census Bureau, the town has a total area of 64.4 square miles (167 km^{2}), of which 50.1 square miles (130 km^{2}) is land and 14.3 square miles (37 km^{2}), or 22.27%, is water. The majority of that water area is from the Watuppa Ponds along the border with Fall River, as well as Westport Harbor, where the two branches of the Westport River meet before emptying into Rhode Island Sound. Westport is bordered by Fall River to the northwest and west, Dartmouth to the east, Rhode Island Sound to the south, and Little Compton, and Adamsville, and Tiverton, Rhode Island, to the west. Westport is approximately 30 miles (48 km) southeast of Providence, Rhode Island, and approximately 60 miles (97 km) south of Boston.

There are several unofficial localities within town: Head of Westport, South Westport, Westport Point, Central Village, North Westport (known in former times as Westport Factory) and Westport Harbor which is also often called Acoaxet, an early name. Because of the west branch of the Westport River, Acoaxet is inaccessible by land except by passing through Adamsville, Rhode Island.

== Climate ==
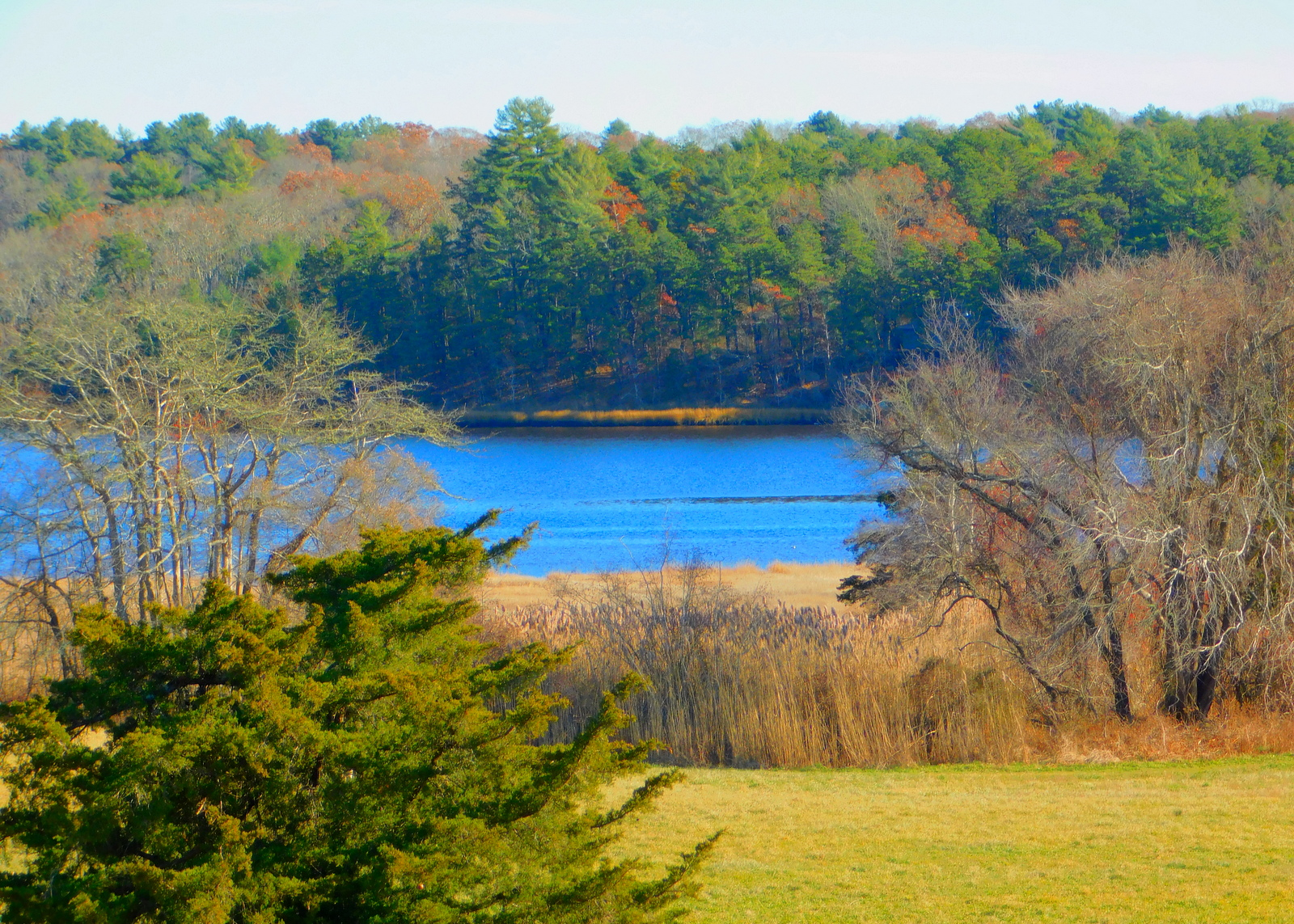
Fall foliage on the Westport River, 2019

Winter: Seasonal effects begin in mid-December and end in mid-March. The snowiest times of the winter season are in January and February. Temperatures average highs in the 30s and lows in the 20s. The coldest time of the year in Westport occurs during January, in which residents can see temperature plummet into the teens and single digits.

Spring: Seasonal effects of spring begin in the end of March and end in mid-May, with mostly rain in March and April and sun/rain in May. Temperatures average with highs in the 50s/60s, and lows in the 40s/50s.

Summer: Seasonal effects begin in the end of May and end in mid-September, with mostly sunny conditions. Hurricanes/tropical storms usually hit or come close to Westport during late August and September. Temperatures average with highs in the 80s, and lows in the 60s and 70s. The hottest time of the year in Westport occurs in mid-July where temperatures can climb to highs in the 90s.

Fall/ Autumn: Seasonal effects begin in the end of September and end in the beginning of December with mostly sunny crisp, cool days. Temperatures range from 50s during the day, and 30s/40s at night.

Hurricanes: Tropical systems occasionally hit Westport or come close to Westport. The most favorable period for tropical systems in Westport are in mid to late August and during the month of September. The last tropical system to hit Westport was Hurricane Sandy on October 29, 2012, which hit the town at about 70 miles per hour (110 km/h) and brought powerful gusts and periods of heavy rain to the area. The storm disrupted power for many across the town, however, much of Westport's service was restored within a day.

Climate data for Westport, Massachusetts
Month	Jan	Feb	Mar	Apr	May	Jun	Jul	Aug	Sep	Oct	Nov	Dec	Year
Record high °F (°C)	66 (19)	69 (21)	78 (26)	91 (33)	98 (37)	100 (38)	102 (39)	107 (42)	94 (34)	87 (31)	79 (26)	70 (21)	107 (42)
Mean daily maximum °F (°C)	37.6 (3.1)	37.8 (3.2)	45.1 (7.3)	54.7 (12.6)	65.5 (18.6)	74.5 (23.6)	80.1 (26.7)	78.6 (25.9)	72.1 (22.3)	64.6 (18.1)	51.8 (11.0)	41.2 (5.1)	58.5 (14.7)
Daily mean °F (°C)	30.6 (−0.8)	30.7 (−0.7)	38.1 (3.4)	47.1 (8.4)	57.4 (14.1)	66.4 (19.1)	72.3 (22.4)	71.2 (21.8)	64.6 (18.1)	54.9 (12.7)	45.0 (7.2)	34.3 (1.3)	51.1 (10.6)
Mean daily minimum °F (°C)	23.5 (−4.7)	23.5 (−4.7)	31.1 (−0.5)	39.6 (4.2)	49.3 (9.6)	58.3 (14.6)	64.8 (18.2)	63.9 (17.7)	57.0 (13.9)	47.3 (8.5)	38.1 (3.4)	27.5 (−2.5)	43.5 (6.4)
Record low °F (°C)	−9 (−23)	−11 (−24)	1 (−17)	16 (−9)	28 (−2)	36 (2)	45 (7)	43 (6)	32 (0)	23 (−5)	10 (−12)	−5 (−21)	−11 (−24)
Average precipitation inches (mm)	3.98 (101)	3.50 (89)	4.21 (107)	3.82 (97)	3.23 (82)	3.27 (83)	2.91 (74)	4.25 (108)	3.27 (83)	3.31 (84)	4.06 (103)	4.06 (103)	43.82 (1,113)
Source 1: Western Regional Climate Center (normals 1958–1992)
Source 2: The Weather Channel (extremes)

== Transportation ==
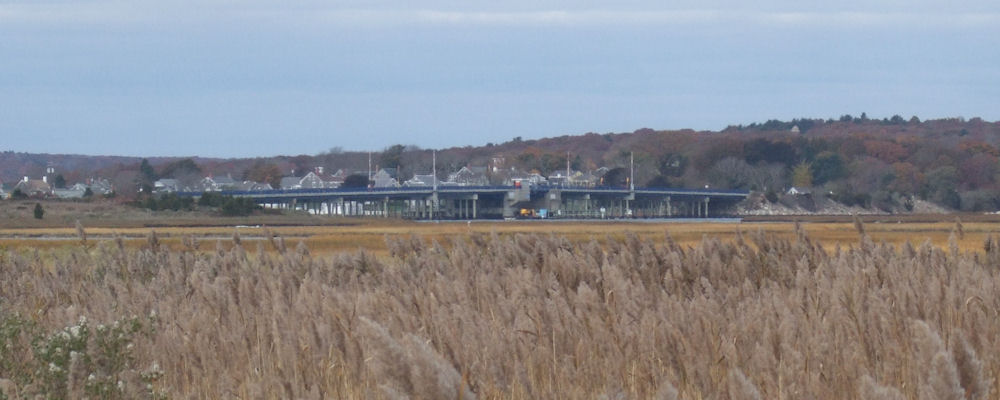
The Fontaine Bridge carries Route 88 over the Westport River.

The town is accessible via Interstate 195, U.S. Route 6, and Massachusetts Route 177, which has its eastern terminus at its intersection at Route 6, on the eastern edge of Westport. Massachusetts Route 88, the longest state highway in Massachusetts to be entirely located within one town, serves as an access from I-195 (at exit 16) to Horseneck Beach State Reservation.

There is bus service along Route 6 provided by the Southeastern Regional Transit Authority (SRTA). During the summer, service is extended to Horseneck Beach. Regional bus service can be reached in Fall River, as is MBTA Commuter Rail service at Fall River station. The nearest airport is New Bedford Regional Airport, 8 miles (13 km) away. National airline service can be reached at T. F. Green Airport in Warwick, Rhode Island, 36 miles (58 km) away.

The North Dartmouth Industrial Track (Watuppa Branch) passes through northern Westport before terminating near Massachusetts Route 88. The track runs from Westport through Dartmouth and into New Bedford, where is connects with the New Bedford Secondary. It is operated by the Massachusetts Coastal Railroad.

== Government ==
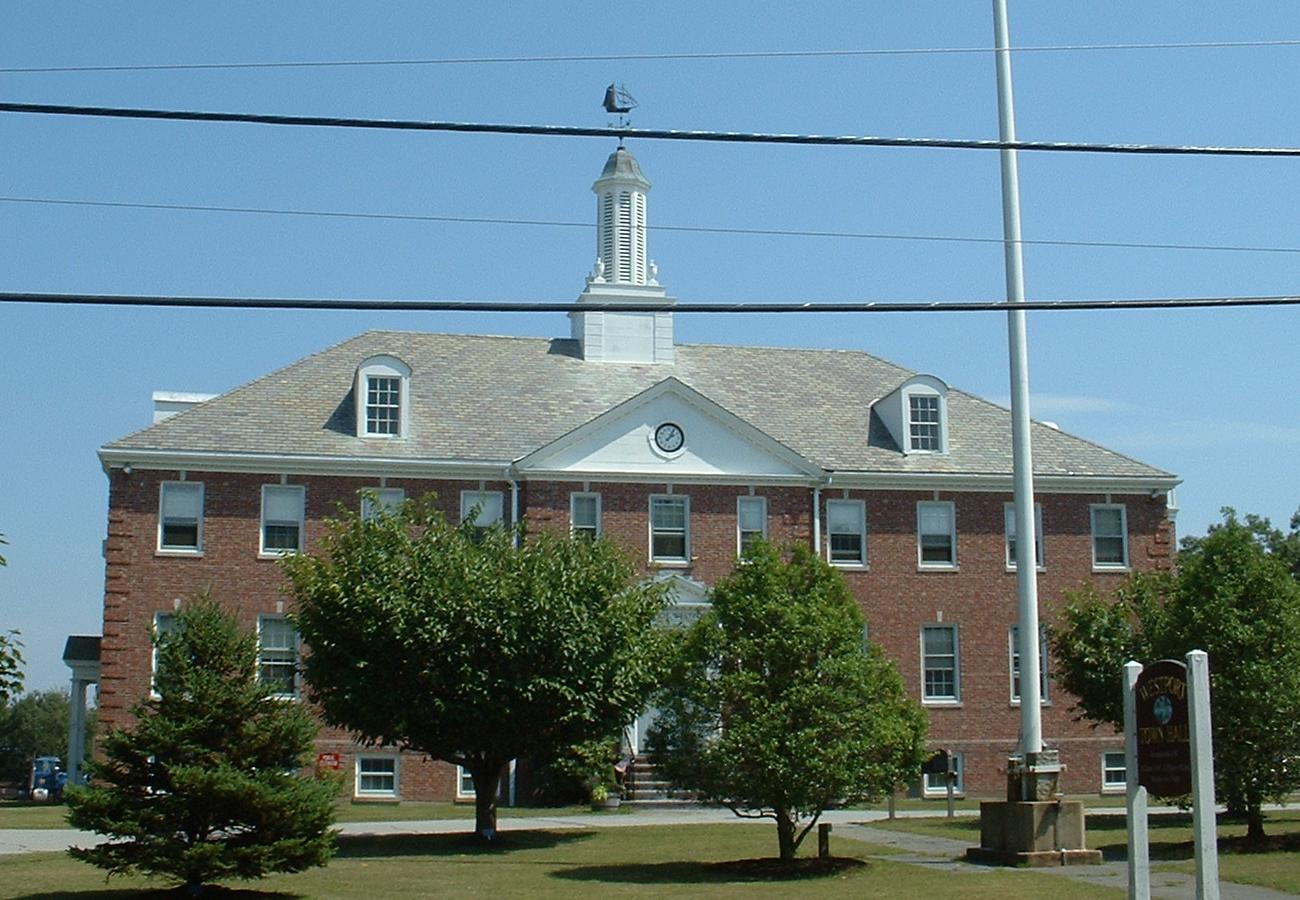
Westport Town Hall, I. T. Almy, architect

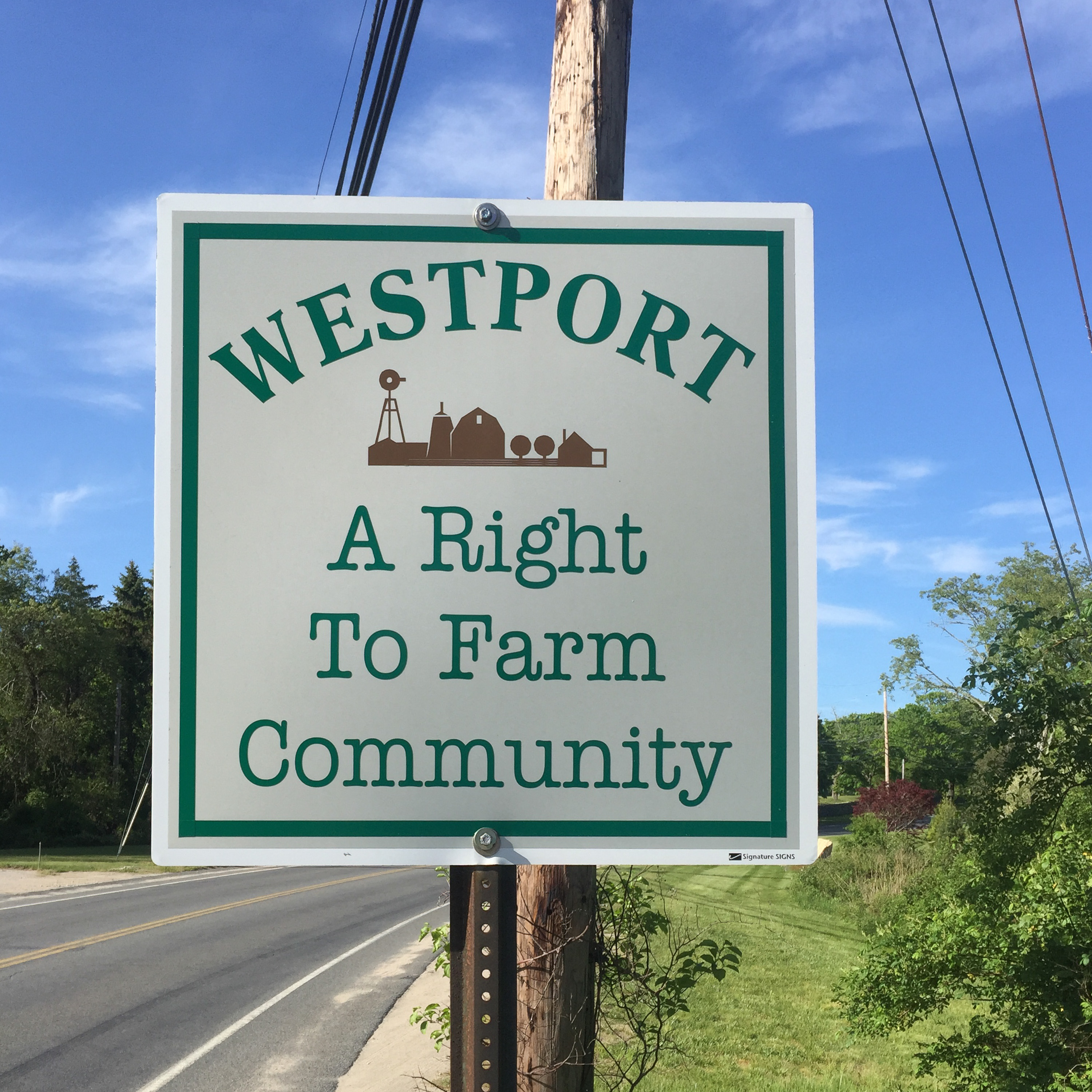
Westport is a Right-to-Farm Community.

Historical marker commemorating introduction of the Macomber turnip

On the state level, Westport is located in the Eighth Bristol state representative district, which includes parts of Fall River and is represented by Representative Paul Schmid (D-Westport). The town is also represented by Senator Michael Rodrigues (D-Fall River), Assistant Majority Leader in the state senate in the First Bristol and Plymouth district, which also includes Fall River, Freetown, Rochester, Somerset and Swansea. On the national level, the town is part of Massachusetts's 9th congressional district, which is represented by William R. Keating. The state's senior Senator, elected in 2012, is Elizabeth Warren. The other senator is Ed Markey, who elected in 2013. Westport is patrolled by the Westport Police Department along with the 3rd (Dartmouth) Barracks of Troop D of the Massachusetts State Police. In the November United States Election of 2012, 59% voted for Barack Obama, and 39% voted for Mitt Romney, with the new Massachusetts state senator, Elizabeth Warren edging out former Senator Scott Brown in the election.

Westport is governed by an open town meeting, led by a five-member board of selectmen. The police department is located directly East of the fire department on hixbridge rd. Westport has a full-time fire department, (which also has on-call firefighters). The two fire stations are located in the north end (on Briggs Rd.) and in the south end (on Hix Bridge Rd). The fire department also staffs two Advanced Life Support ambulances 24 hours a day. There are four post offices for the town's two ZIP codes; The main post office on Route 6, a smaller branch (on Old County Rd.) at the Head of Westport, and the branch (on Adamsville Rd.) in Central Village serve the ZIP code 02790, while the 02791 ZIP code (Westport Point) is served by the Central Village station and at the point itself, on Main Rd. The town's library, the Westport Free Public Library, is located next to Westport Middle School, directly west of the Head of Westport.

Politically, Westport has become more conservative in recent years, like the rest of the South Coast region of Massachusetts. In the 2024 Presidential election, Donald Trump became the first Republican to carry Westport since 1984.

== Education ==
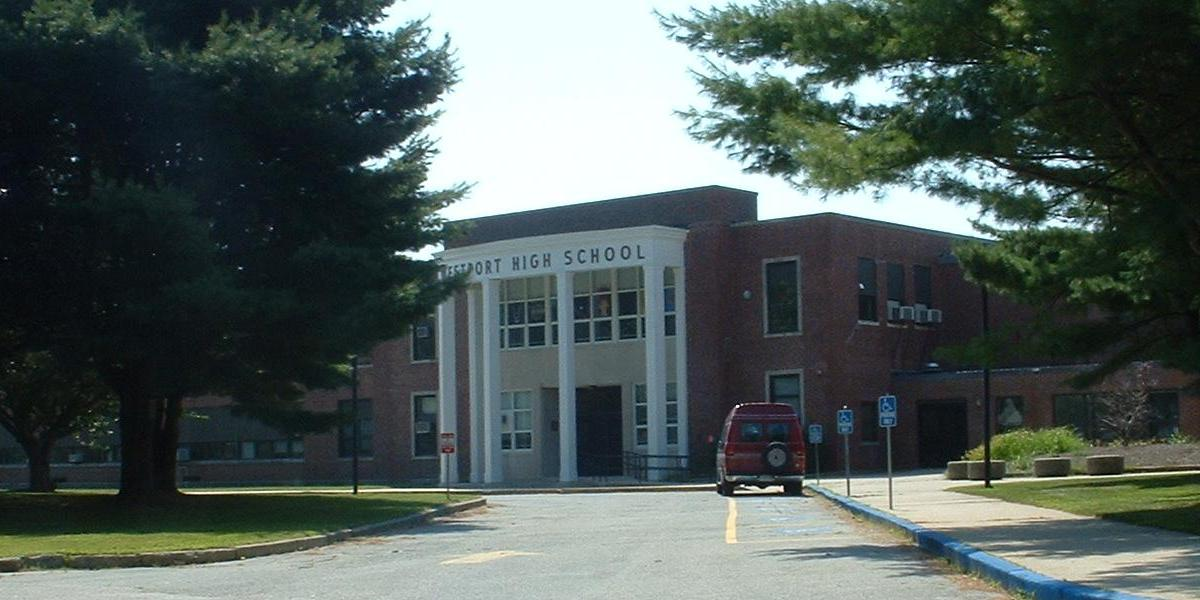
The former Westport High School

Westport has its own school system. There are three schools: Alice A. Macomber School, which provides pre-school (pre-kindergarten), and kindergarten; Westport Elementary School, near the Head of Westport, which serves grades 1-4; and Westport Middle/High School, which serves grades 5–12 (5-8 as Westport Middle School and 9-12 as Westport High School). Students who graduate from Westport High School with enough credits in certain fields of study will earn special academy certificates, in addition to their high school diplomas. This was modeled after University-style degrees.

Their team name is the Westport Wildcats who have won multiple championships in the Mayflower League. The Wildcats are one of the few teams in the Mayflower League who have won multiple championships in every sport. Their mascot is the Wildcat, and their colors are brown, white and yellow (a legacy of when Westport was in a different league that used Ivy League colors—Westport using brown and white after Brown University). The school is a member of the Mayflower League, and competes against mostly division 3 and 4 schools in the region.

Westport High School graduated 94% of its class in 2013.

In addition to their schools, incoming high school students may choose to attend Diman Regional Vocational Technical High School in Fall River or Bristol County Agricultural High School in Dighton, free of charge. Juniors and Seniors may opt to take college classes at UMass Dartmouth in Dartmouth or Bristol Community College in Fall River to earn both high school and college credits. Internships and independent study are offered as well.

There is one private school in the town, Montessori School of the Angels, which serves grades 1–8, located in the Westport Factory neighborhood. It was formerly known as Saint Joseph's Montessori, and was located in Fall River; the school building itself was formerly Saint George's School, which closed due to lack of funding and declining attendance. Many students also attend private and charter schools in Fall River and Dartmouth, including Bishop Connolly High School in Fall River and Bishop Stang High School in North Dartmouth.

== Demographics ==
Historical population
Year	Pop.	±%
1790	2,466	—
1850	2,795	+13.3%
1860	2,767	−1.0%
1870	2,724	−1.6%
1880	2,894	+6.2%
1890	2,599	−10.2%
1900	2,890	+11.2%
1910	2,928	+1.3%
1920	3,115	+6.4%
1930	4,408	+41.5%
1940	4,134	−6.2%
1950	4,989	+20.7%
1960	6,641	+33.1%
1970	9,791	+47.4%
1980	13,763	+40.6%
1990	13,852	+0.6%
2000	14,183	+2.4%
2010	15,532	+9.5%
2020	16,339	+5.2%
2024*	16,705	+2.2%
* = population estimate. Source: United States census records and Population Estimates Program data.

As of the census of 2010, there were 15,532 people, 5,386 households, and 4,082 families residing in the town. The population density was 283.4 inhabitants per square mile (109.4/km^{2}). There were 6,143 housing units at an average density of 122.7 per square mile (47.4/km^{2}). The racial makeup of the town was 98.01% White, 0.17% African American, 0.14% Native American, 0.49% Asian, 0.02% Pacific Islander, 0.37% from other races, and 0.79% from two or more races. Hispanic or Latino of any race were 0.69% of the population.

There were 5,386 households in Westport, of which 29.0% had children under the age of 18 living with them, 62.9% were married couples living together, 9.0% had a female householder with no husband present, and 24.2% were non-families. 19.7% of all households were made up of individuals, and 8.9% had someone living alone who was 65 years of age or older. The average household size was 2.62 and the average family size was 3.01.

In the town, the population was spread out, with 21.6% under the age of 18, 6.7% from 18 to 24, 28.0% from 25 to 44, 29.0% from 45 to 64, and 14.6% who were 65 years of age or older. The median age was 41 years. For every 100 females, there were 96.0 males. For every 100 females age 18 and over, there were 95.2 males.

The median income for a household in the town was $55,436, and the median income for a family was $64,568. Males had a median income of $41,890 versus $30,921 for females. The per capita income for the town was $25,281. About 3.7% of families and 4.9% of the population were below the poverty line, including 5.5% of those under age 18 and 7.9% of those age 65 or over.

== Notable people ==
- Paul Bedard, former Horseneck Beach lifeguard, host of Gator Boys
- Thomas Church Brownell (1779–1865), founder of Trinity College
- Paul Cuffee, businessman
- Ruby Devol Finch, watercolorist
- Black Francis, songwriter, lead singer, drummer, and rhythm guitarist of the Pixies
- Allen Levrault, former Major League Baseball Player (Milwaukee Brewers from 2001–2003, and the Florida Marlins in 2003)
- Wendi Nix, ESPN College Football, and NFL analyst
- Edwin Slade, Wisconsin State Assemblyman and businessman
- Jane Tuckerman, photographer
- Jorge Ferreira, Portuguese popular music singer
