= Remain (film) =

2026 film by M. Night Shyamalan

- Teaser poster
- Directed by: M. Night Shyamalan
- Screenplay by: M. Night Shyamalan
- Story by: M. Night Shyamalan; Nicholas Sparks
- Produced by: M. Night Shyamalan; Ashwin Rajan; Theresa Park; Marc Bienstock
- Starring: Jake Gyllenhaal; Phoebe Dynevor; Ashley Walters; Julie Hagerty; Jay O. Sanders
- Cinematography: Adolpho Veloso
- Edited by: Noëmi Preiswerk
- Music by: James Newton Howard
- Production company: Blinding Edge Pictures
- Distributed by: Warner Bros. Pictures
- Release dates: September 29, 2026 (Beyond Fest); February 5, 2027 (United States)
- Country: United States
- Language: English

Remain is a 2026 American supernatural romantic thriller film written, directed, and produced by M. Night Shyamalan, based on an idea he developed with Nicholas Sparks, who separately wrote a version of the story as a novel published in 2025. The film stars Jake Gyllenhaal, Phoebe Dynevor, Ashley Walters, Julie Hagerty, and Jay O. Sanders.

Remain premiered as a surprise screening at Beyond Fest on September 29, 2026, and is scheduled to be released by Warner Bros. Pictures in the United States on February 5, 2027.

== Premise ==
New York architect Tate Gordon heads to Cape Cod to design a summer home for his best friend, seeking a fresh start after being treated for acute depression. Still mourning his sister's death, he meets Wren, a young woman who disrupts his carefully ordered world.

== Cast ==
- Jake Gyllenhaal as Tate Gordon
- Phoebe Dynevor as Wren
- Ashley Walters as Oscar
- Julie Hagerty as Louise
- Jay O. Sanders as Reece
- Tracy Ifeachor as Theresa
- Hannah James as Tessa
- Caleb Ruminer as Griffin
- Kieran Mulcare as Dax
- Maria Dizzia as Sydney
- M. Night Shyamalan as Nash

== Production ==
=== Development ===
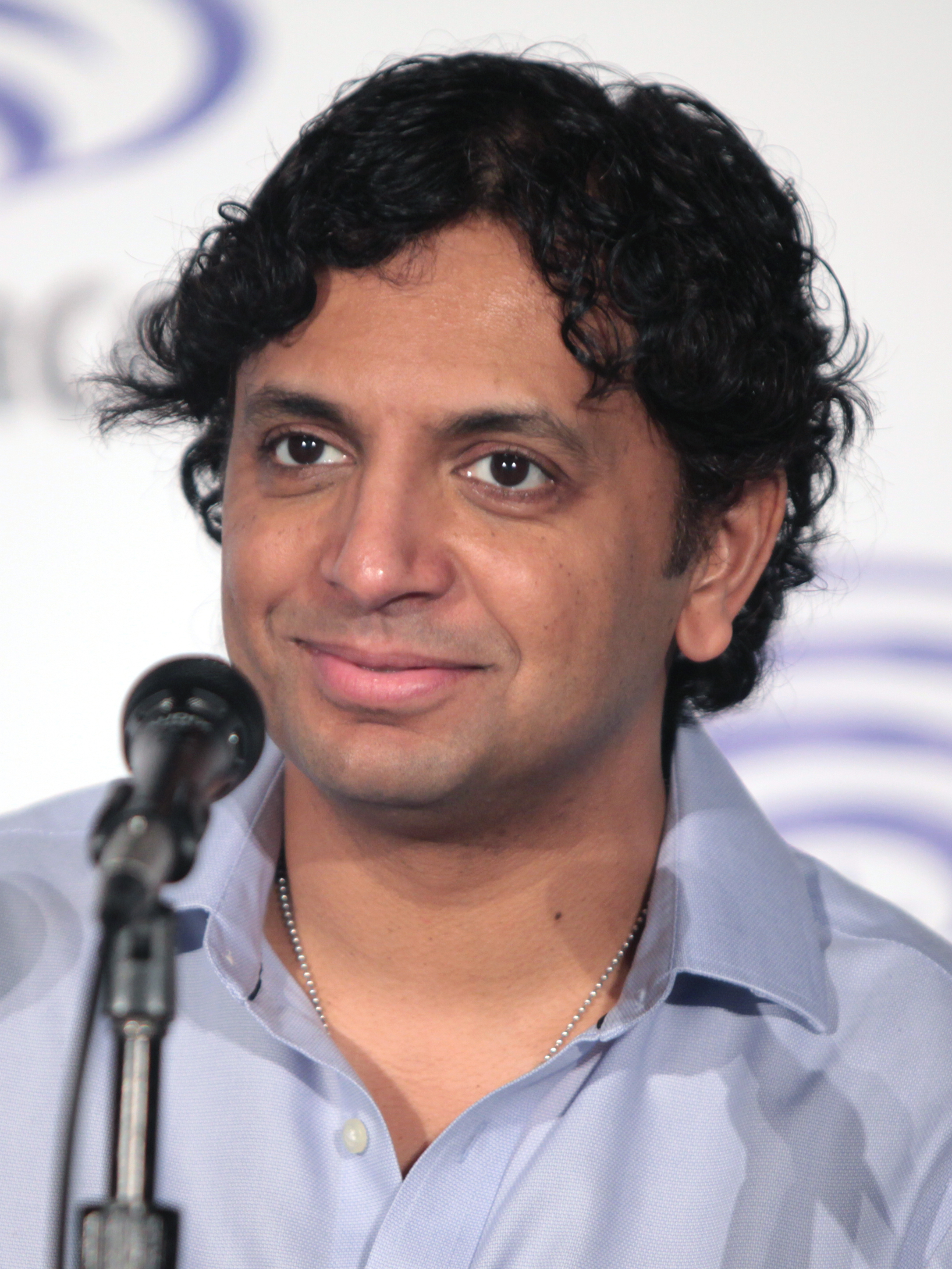
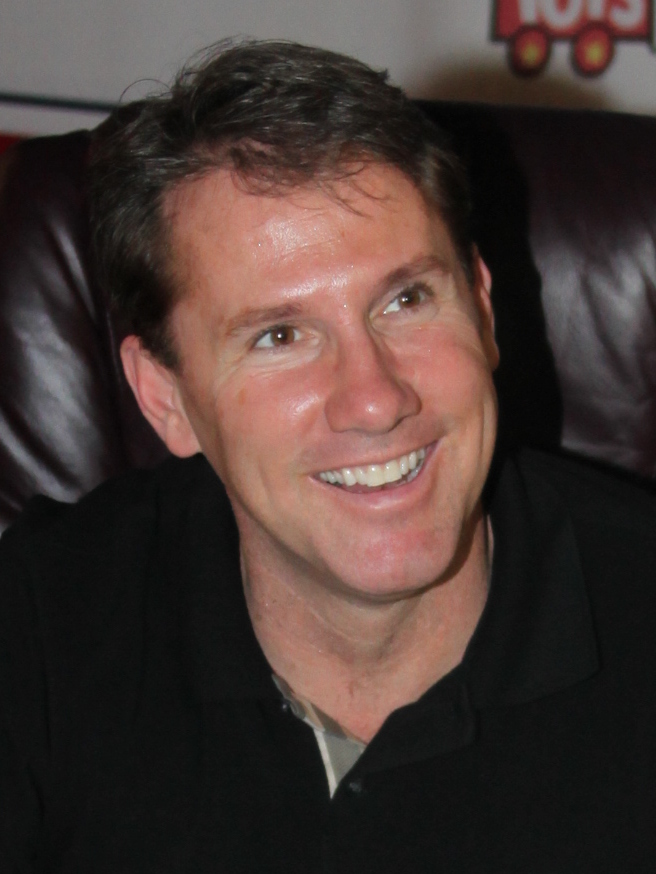
Remain is based on a story developed by M. Night Shyamalan (left) and Nicholas Sparks (right).

Filmmaker M. Night Shyamalan almost worked with novelist Nicholas Sparks decades earlier after the latter suggested he be approached to rewrite the screenplay for The Notebook (2004), the film adaptation of Sparks' eponymous 1996 novel; Shyamalan declined the offer to make The Sixth Sense (1999) instead. In May 2023, the two met at Shyamalan's Pennsylvania residence to brainstorm ideas for a collaboration that would suit their respective cinematic and literary mediums. They proceeded with Shyamalan's pitch and devised characters during that first meeting.

In August 2024, Shyamalan told Sparks that he planned to adapt their story into a screenplay to direct. Sparks received Shyamalan's script in October and decided to write the novel version of the same story, "the way it should be told in a novel". He completed the book in January and published it in October 2025.

Shortly after printing his script, Shyamalan had lunch in New York with Jake Gyllenhaal. When the actor alluded to wanting to work with him, Shyamalan handed him the copy. In January 2025, Warner Bros. Pictures acquired the distribution rights to the film, described as a supernatural romantic thriller, with Gyllenhaal cast in the lead role. By May, Phoebe Dynevor and Ashley Walters joined the cast of the film, now titled Remain. In July, additional cast members were revealed.

=== Filming ===
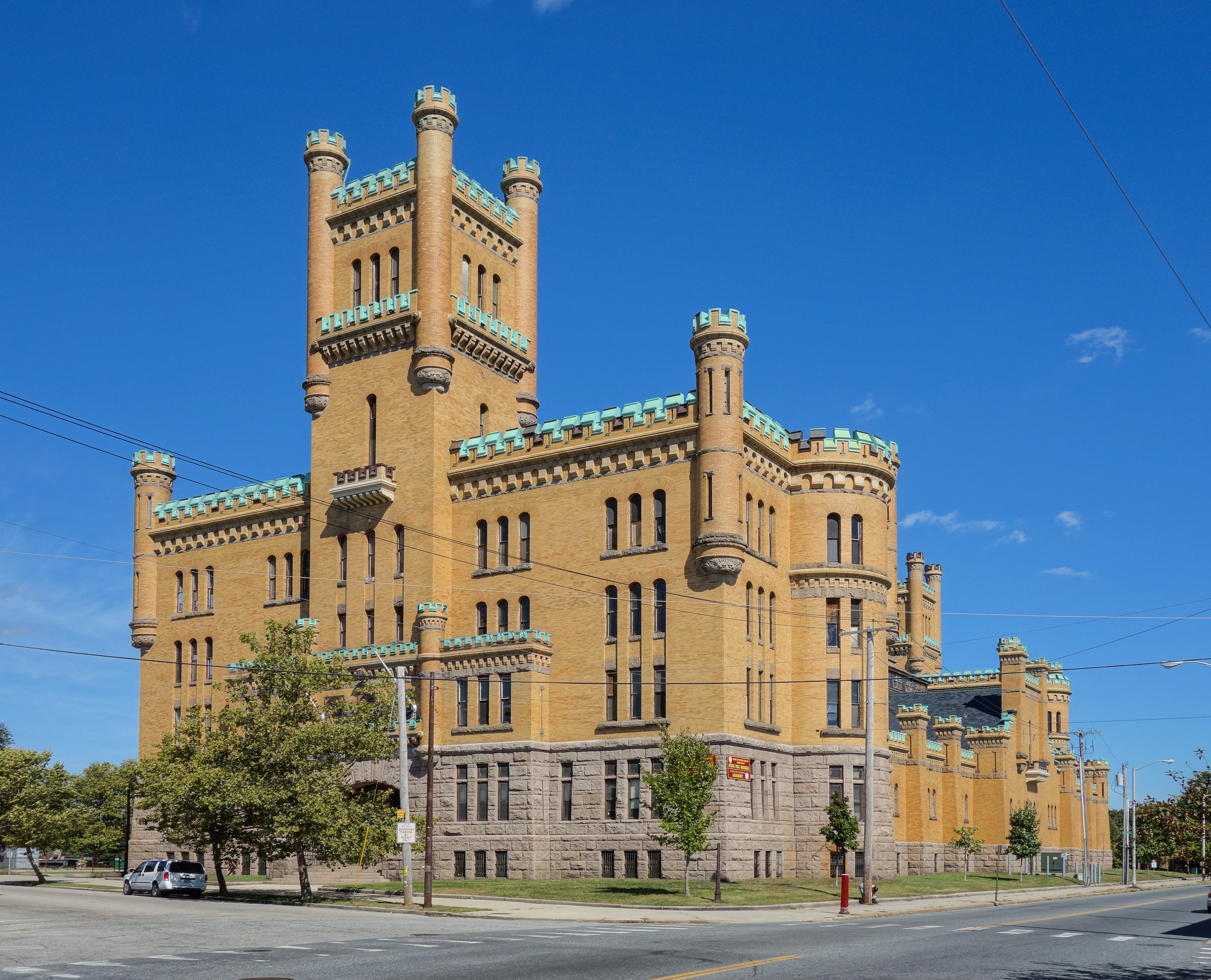
Remain was filmed in Rhode Island; the historic Cranston Street Armory (pictured) in Providence served as a central location.

Remain was shot with 35 mm VistaVision cameras by cinematographer Adolpho Veloso. The film features several aspect ratio changes to signal format and camera changes. Principal photography took place in Rhode Island, commencing on June 18, 2025. Filming was set to conclude on August 8, and a wrap party was held on August 10.

Locations included the Coffee Depot in Warren; a ferry on Narragansett Bay (accessed via the Prudence Island Ferry dock) and the town common in Bristol; the closed Gray's General Store in Adamsville and Haffenreffer estate in Sakonnet Point, Little Compton; Washington Square (including the exterior of the Florence K. Murray Courthouse in Eisenhower Park) in Newport; the Swamp Meadow Bridge in Foster; a tavern in Chepachet, Glocester; the Cranston Street Armory and Dexter Training Ground in Providence; and the Fort Wetherill State Park in Jamestown.

Shyamalan's production company Blinding Edge Pictures paid a monthly $10,000 fee to lease the historic Cranston Street Armory for seven months, starting in May 2025. The production moved into the armory, used as a soundstage for the interior of a bed-and-breakfast, in early July, moved out on July 30, and planned to keep it available until late November for any necessary reshoots. In February 2026, the production returned to the Armory to film either reshoots or additional scenes.

=== Post-production ===
James Newton Howard composed the score, marking his ninth collaboration with Shyamalan and first since After Earth (2013).

== Release ==
Remain is scheduled to be theatrically released by Warner Bros. on February 5, 2027. It was previously set to be released on October 23, 2026.

The film premiered as a surprise double feature at Beyond Fest on September 29, 2026, before a retrospective screening of Shyamalan's The Sixth Sense (1999). Shyamalan's past collaborators Bryce Dallas Howard and the Duffer Brothers were in attendance.
