= General store =

Rural or small-town store

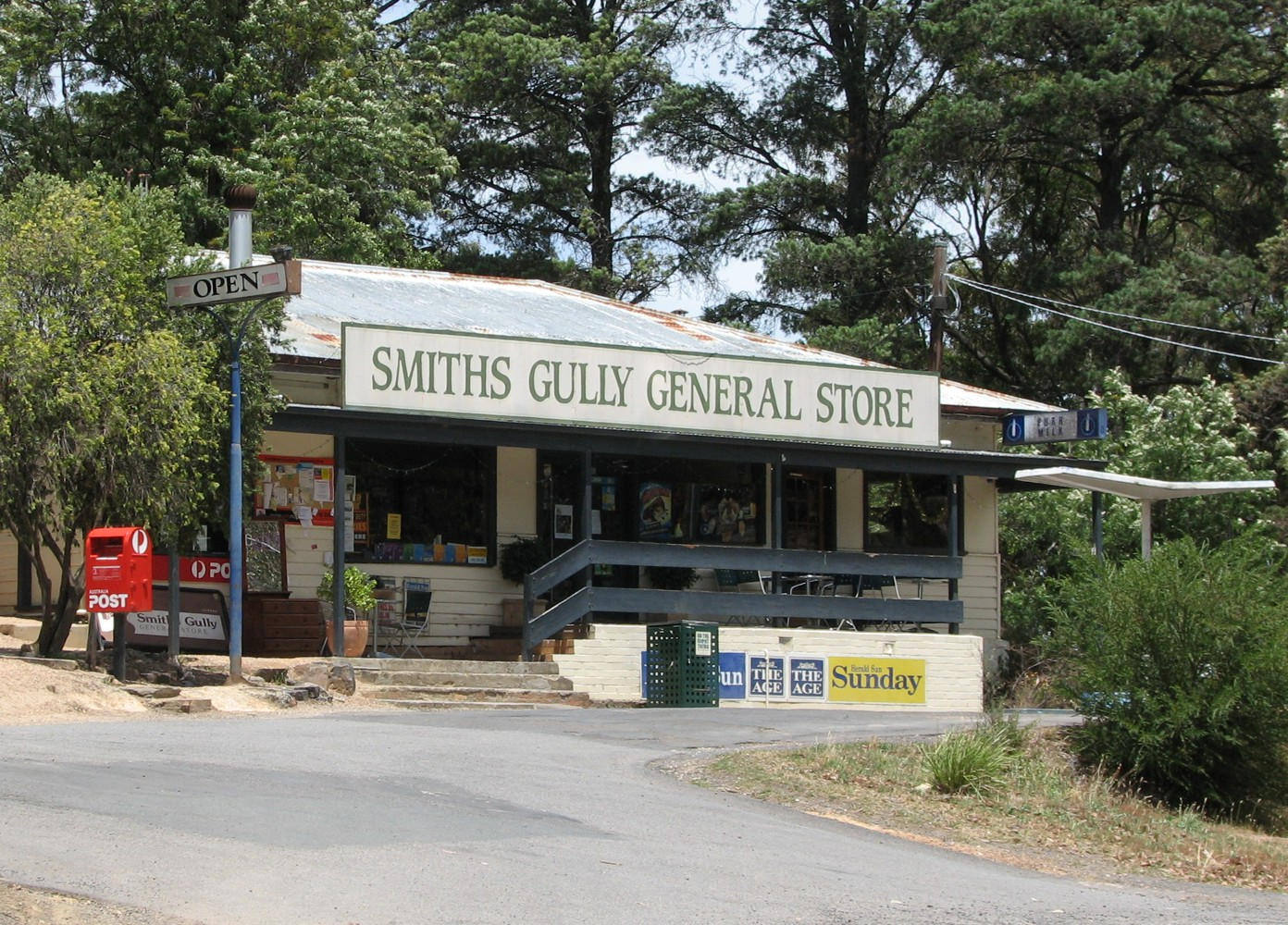
Smiths Gully General Store in Smiths Gully, Australia, 2007

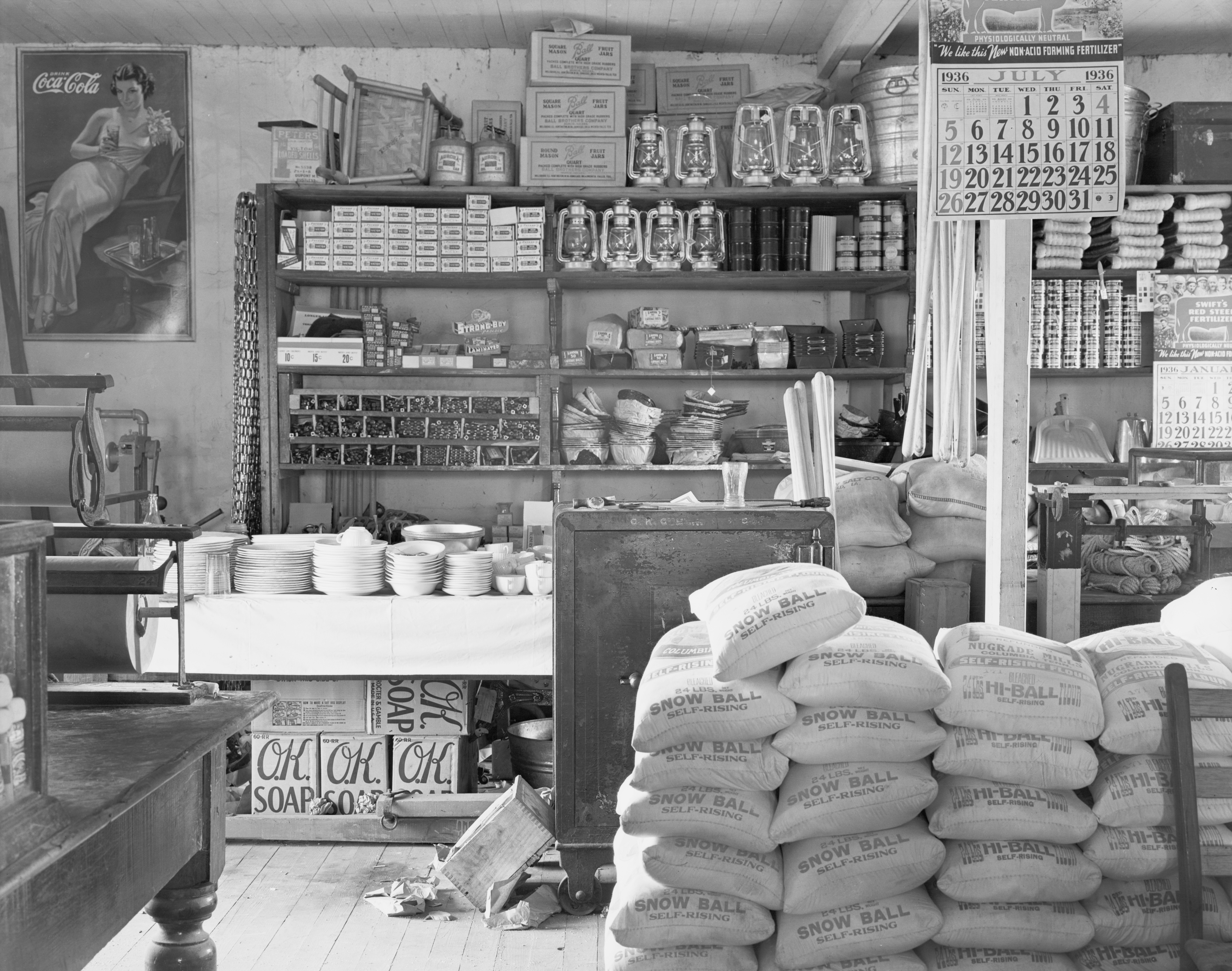
Interior of a general store in Moundville, Alabama, US, 1936

A general merchant store (also known as general merchandise store, general dealer, village shop, or country store) is a rural or small-town store that carries a general line of merchandise. It carries a broad selection of goods, sometimes in a small space, where people from the town and surrounding rural areas come to purchase all their general provisions. The store carries routine stock and obtains special orders from warehouses. It differs from a convenience store or corner shop in that it will be the main shop for the community rather than a convenient supplement.

General stores often sell staple food items such as milk and bread, and various household goods such as hardware and electrical supplies. The concept of the general store is very old, and although some still exist, there are far fewer than there once were, due to urbanization, urban sprawl, and the relatively recent phenomenon of big-box stores and hypermarkets, combining a general merchandise store with a supermarket. The term "general merchandise store" is also used to describe a hybrid of a department store, with a wide selection of goods, and a discount store, with low prices. Examples include J. C. Penney and Sears.

== History ==
General dealers were established in the 18th and 19th centuries in many remote populated places where mobility was limited and a single shop was sufficient to service the entire community. Due to its close connection and confinement to its customers, general dealers often adjusted their sales offerings to the specific preferences of their community.

General dealers existed, apart from mainland Europe and Asia, in all European colonies and generally in areas where colonists encroached upon communities that previously did not trade with money. In the colonies, trading or bartering in local produce had existed long before official shops were opened. The growing need for imported goods, both from European settlers and native populations, led to the establishment of a network of merchants, and subsequently to the creation of a money economy.

== By country ==
=== Australia ===
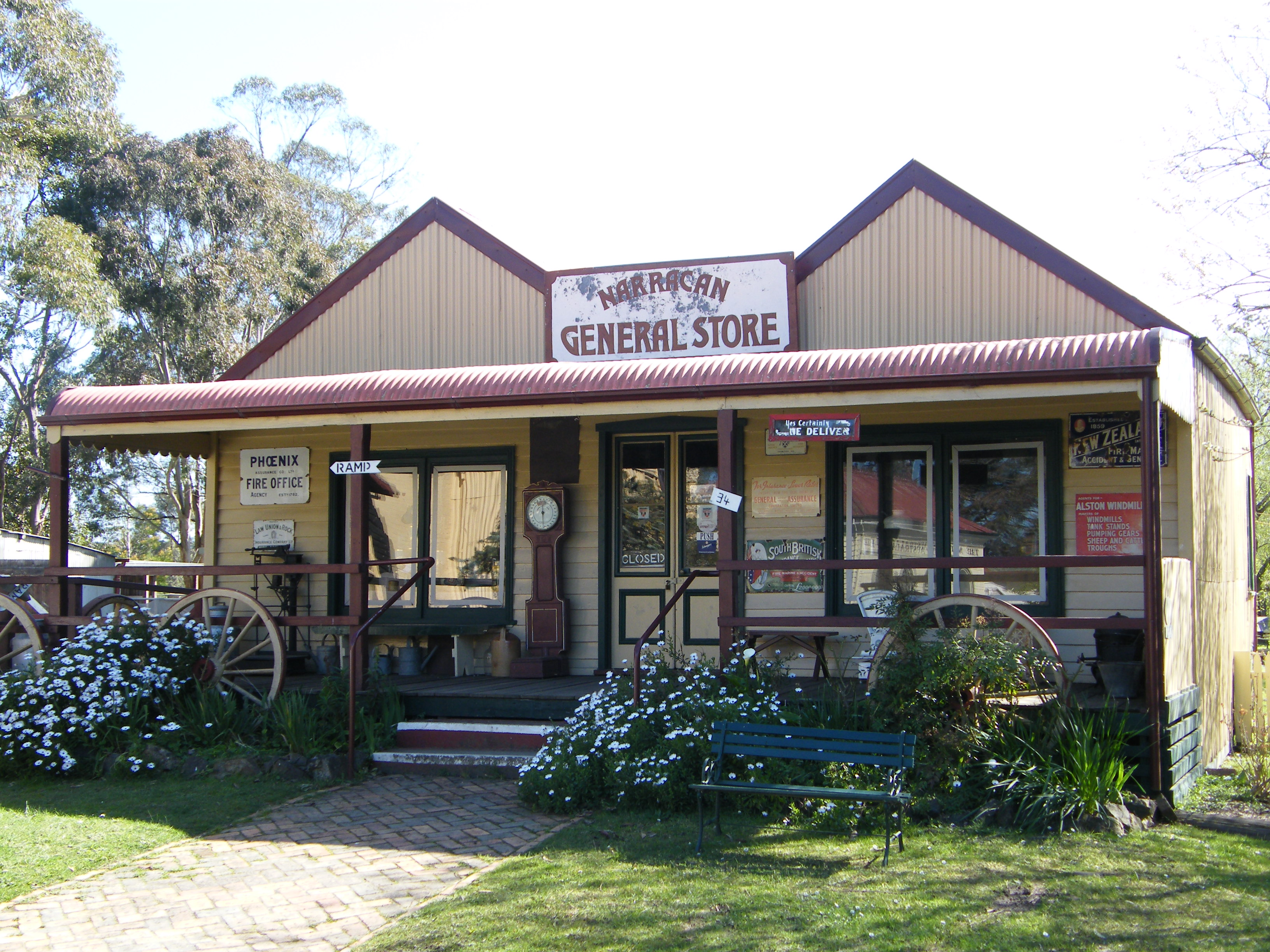
The former Narracan General Store, now located at Old Gippstown in Moe, Australia, 2012

While a large number of general stores still exist in Australia, as in other parts of the world their numbers were greatly reduced by the advent of supermarkets.

=== Canada ===
The oldest continually run general store in Canada is Trousdale's, located in Sydenham, Ontario, which has been operated by the Trousdale family since 1836. Sociability has always been a feature, as locals come to chat as well as buy. Gray Creek Store in Gray Creek, Kootenay Bay, Canada is the largest and oldest general dealer in the Kootenay Lake region Enniskillen General Store in Clarington, Ontario has been in operation since 1840 and still continues today. Robinson's General Store in Dorset, Ontario, voted "Canada's Best Country Store", has been owned and operated by the same family since 1921.

=== Dominican Republic ===
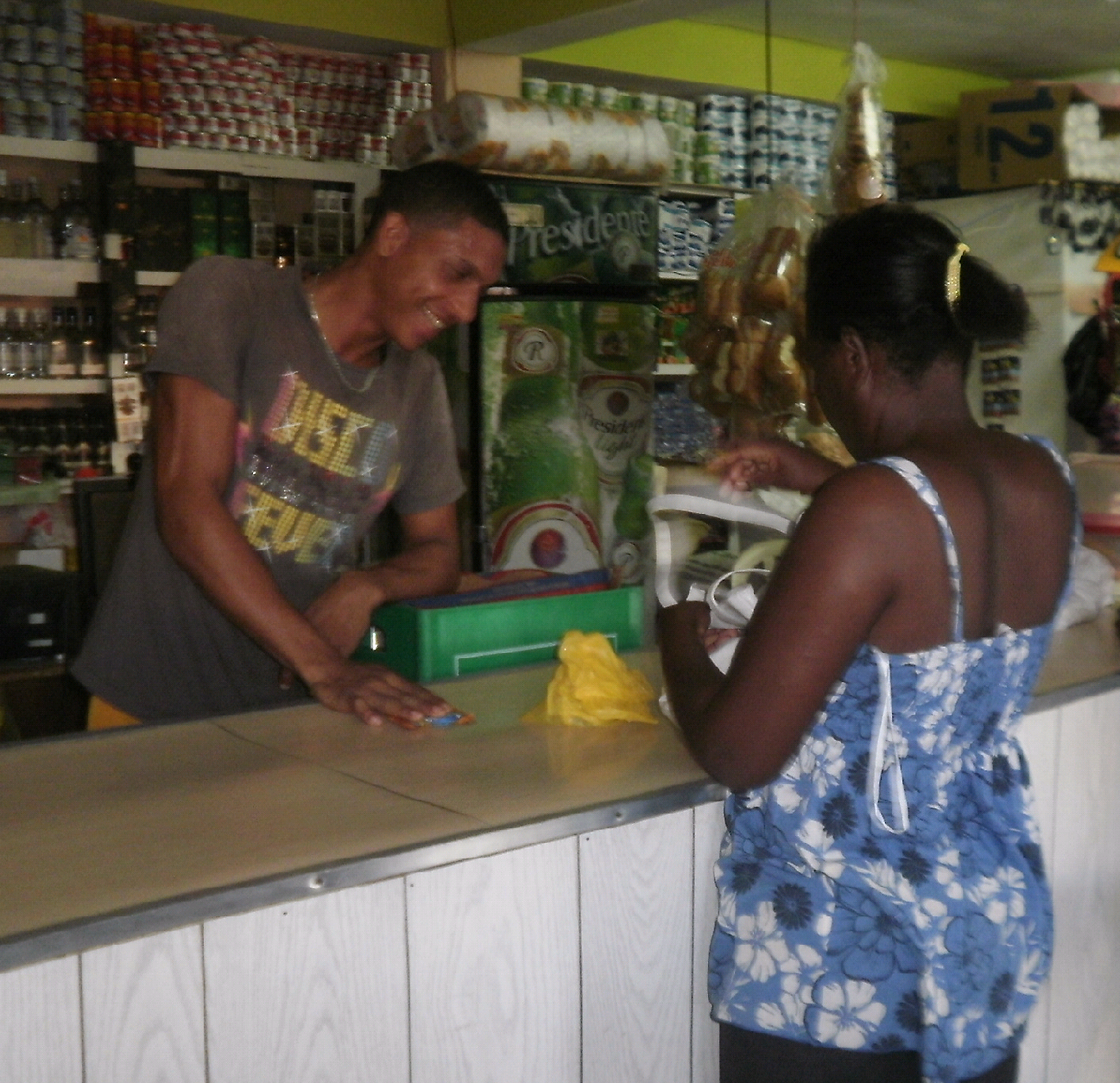
Woman buying from a colmado in the Dominican Republic, 2011

In the Dominican Republic the equivalent of the general store is the colmado, a word whose literal translation is 'full to the brim', implying its great density of goods in a small space. The colmado is much more than just a general store, for it offers a social gathering point for the residents of the town or neighborhood. The colmado is an important institution in the Dominican Republic serving as an economic, social and political center for every small community. It is common for colmados to have loud Dominican music such as merengue, bachata, or salsa playing. A common pastime for Dominican men is to play dominoes and drink a beer at their local colmado on Sundays. Another particularity of the colmado is that they provide delivery service of their products directly to the customer's dwelling. Products range from beer, snacks, and toilet paper to flashlights and canned food.

=== Egypt ===
In Egypt the closest equivalent of the country store traditionally tended to be Greek-owned businesses, and these Greek merchants were called bakal.

=== Finland ===
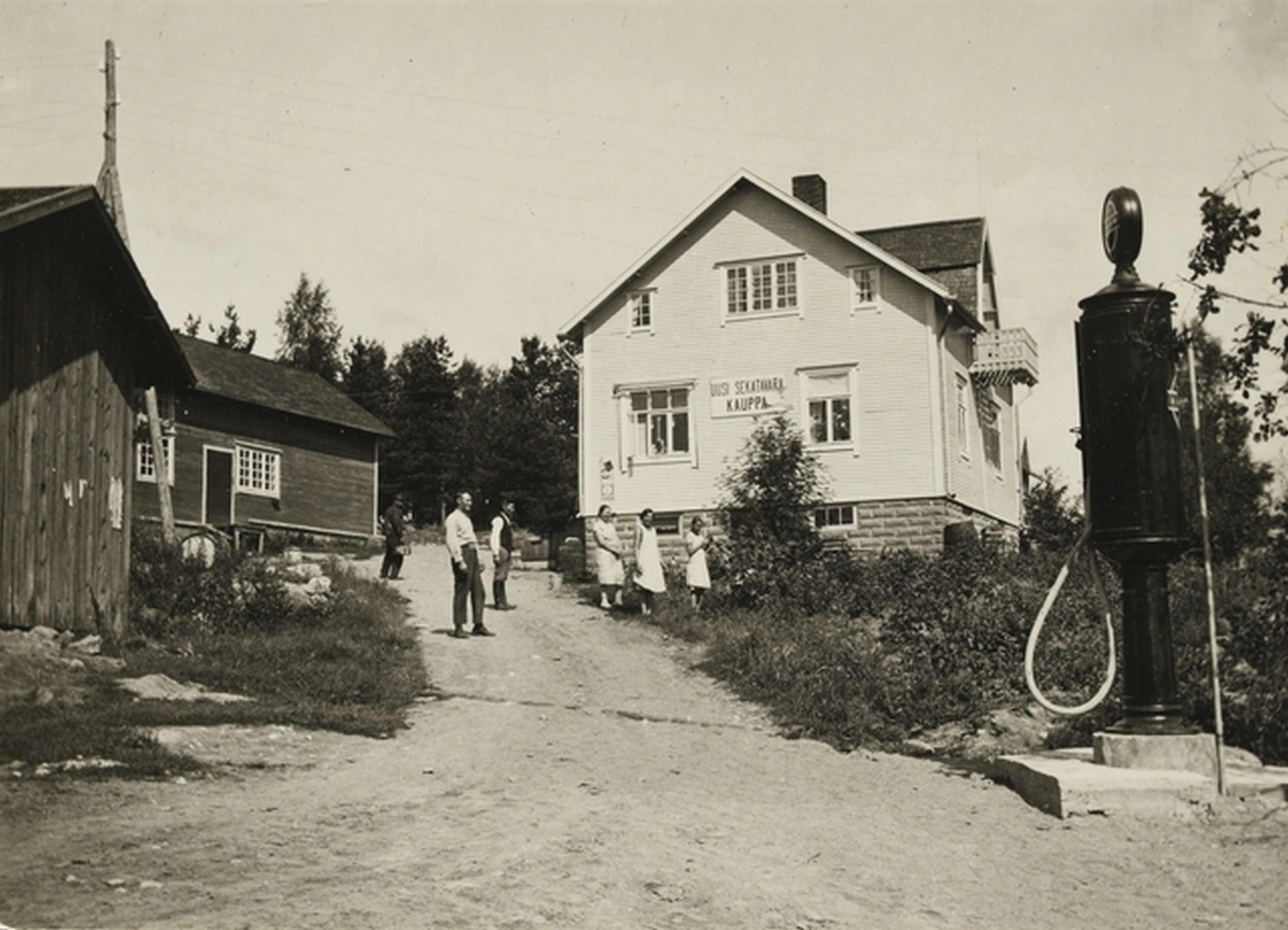
General store in Angelniemi, 1930

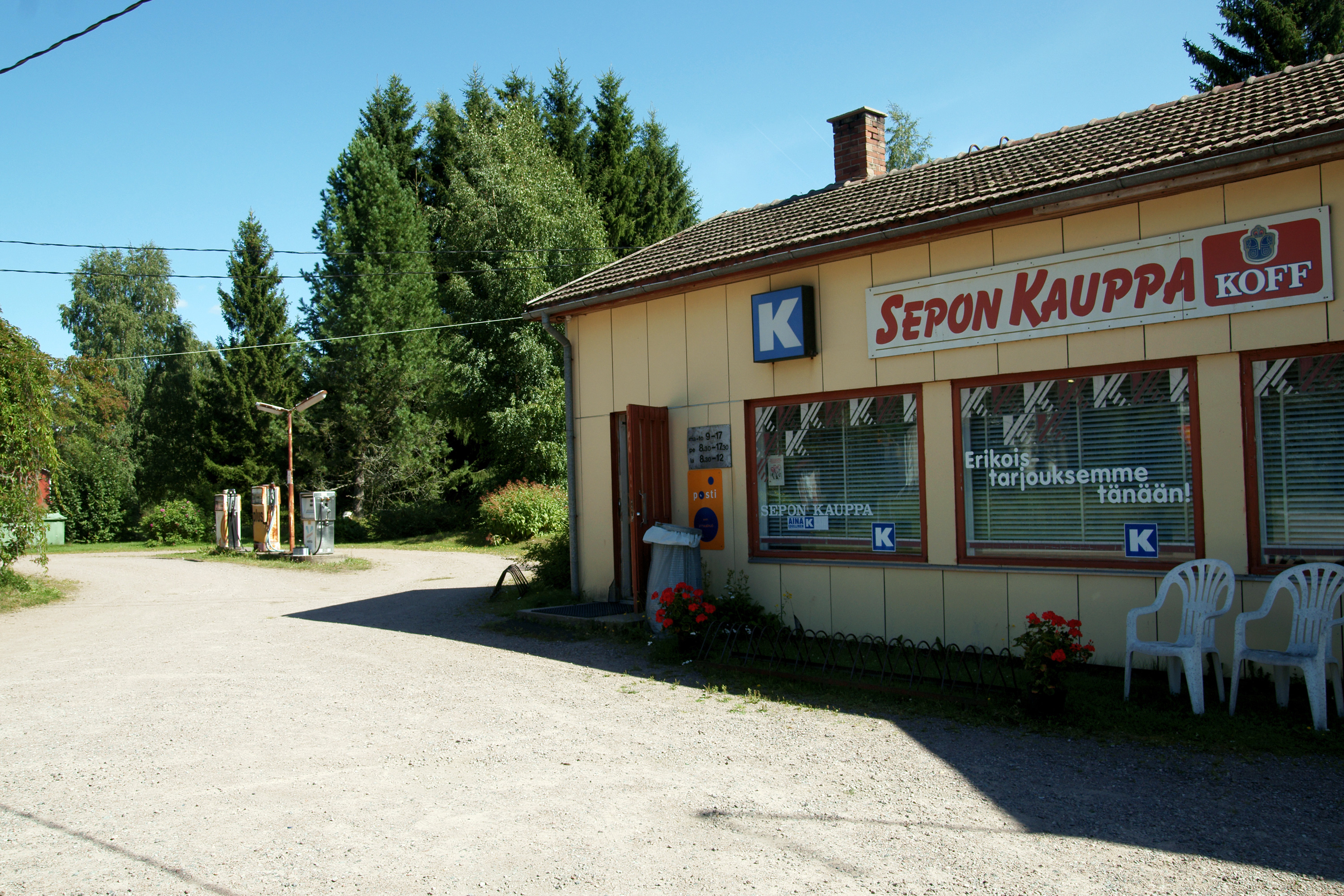
A village store (Sepon kauppa; or "Seppo's shop") in Yttilä, Säkylä, in August 2011. This particular store was closed in 2014

General stores (sekatavarakauppa) first appeared in Finland in 1859 when fixed shop retailers were allowed to set up shops in rural towns for the first time. Prior to that, authorised trade in rural products other than those produced in the same region depended on city travel, open-air markets and fairs. A related type of store is the village store (kyläkauppa), typically located in sparsely populated towns, which still performs many similar functions to general stores. As in many other countries, their numbers were greatly reduced with the advent of supermarkets, from over 3400 such shops in 1980 to 241 in 2017.

=== India/Pakistan ===
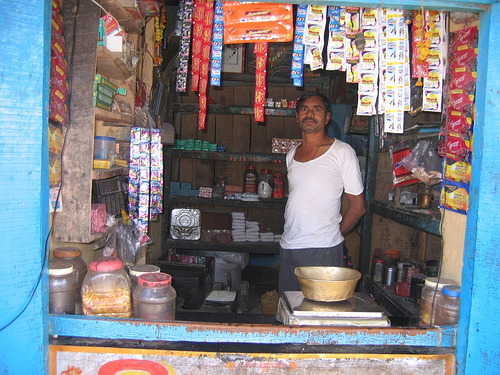
Tapri on Mumbai streets, 2013

In India and Pakistan, a tapri is a regional version of a general store. It stores all home, personal, medical, and hygienic daily-use products. Many Kirana shops sell products other than food, such as clothing or household items, stationery, toys, tools, and medicines. Small Kirana stores, which are generally located on the corner of streets and generally known as katta or tapri, sell cigarettes, tobacco, and tea.

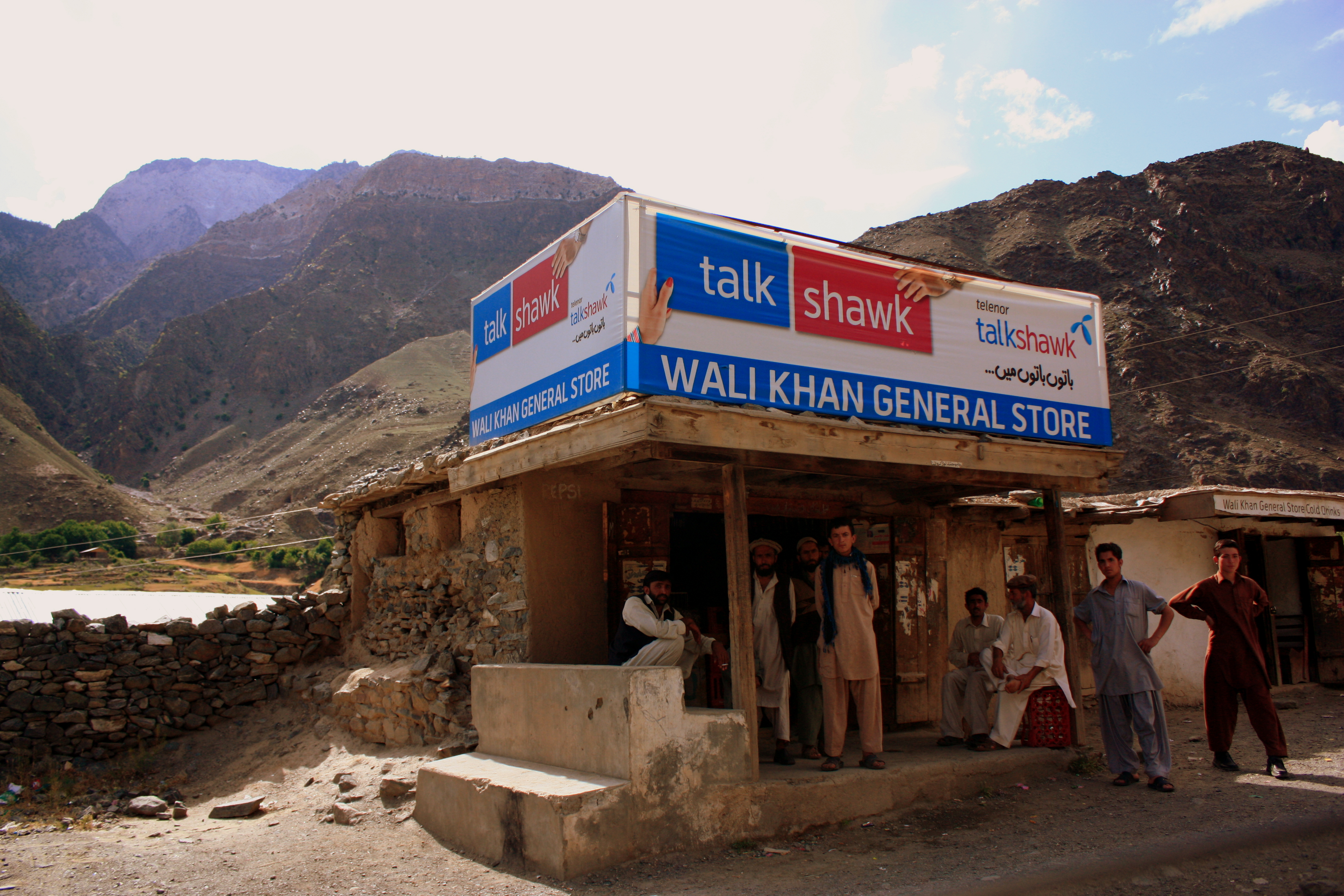
General Store on the road to Kalash valleys, Chitral, Pakistan, 2012

Recently, there has been a notable integration of Aadhaar-enabled Payment System (AePS) services in Kirana or general stores across India. AePS allows customers to conduct basic banking transactions such as cash withdrawal, balance inquiry, and fund transfer using their Aadhaar number and biometric authentication. This integration has enabled Kirana stores to serve as financial service points, offering convenient banking services to local communities.

On 30 July 2024, Open Network for Digital Commerce (ONDC) introduced an interoperable QR code to link neighborhood store owners with consumers. With ONDC-registered buyer apps like Magicpin and Paytm, merchants can create a unique QR code that customers can scan to access their online store on the ONDC platform.

=== Namibia ===
Due to its sparse population, there are still a number of general stores (called dealers) in Namibia, such as the Solitaire General Dealer in Solitaire, an important stopover for tourists throughout Namibia's Namib-Naukluft Park.

=== Puerto Rico ===
In Puerto Rico, a US territory, several general stores ("colmado") have proliferated since the 1970s.

- Supermercados Selectos
- Supermercados Econo

=== South Africa ===
There are still many general dealers in South Africa; the oldest is Oom Samie se Winkel (Afrikaans: Uncle Sammie's Shop) in Dorp Street, Stellenbosch. Oepverkoop is the oldest general dealer in Paternoster, Western Cape. Goodwood Museum in Cape Town displays the operation of a general dealer shop.

=== United Kingdom ===
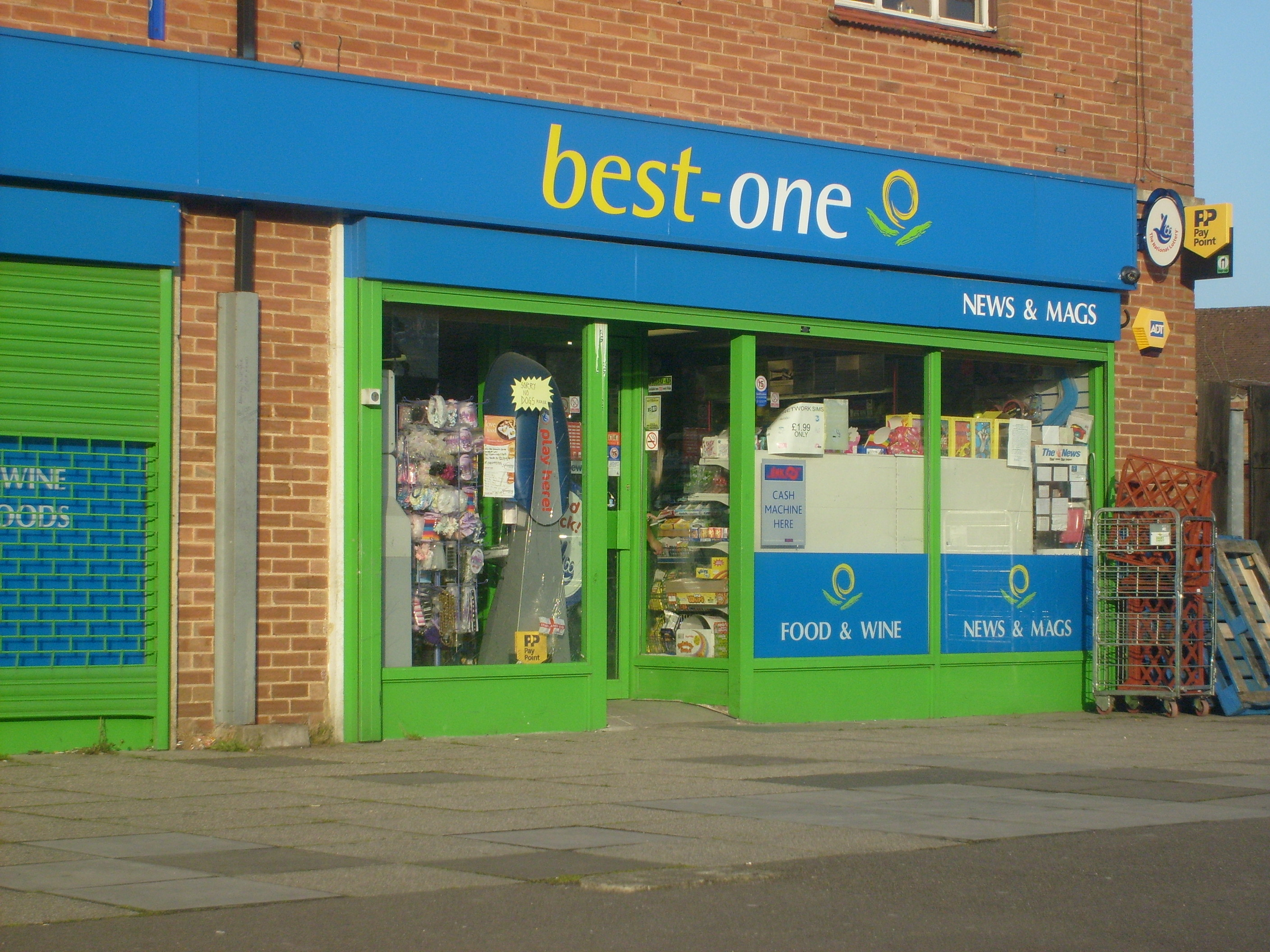
A best-one corner shop in the United Kingdom, 2008

Village shops are becoming less common in the densely populated parts of the country, although they remain common in remote rural areas. Their rarity in England is due to several factors, such as the rise in car ownership, competition from large chain supermarkets, the rising cost of village properties, and the increasing trend of the wealthy to own holiday homes in picturesque villages, consequently these houses which used to be occupied full-time by potential customers are often vacant for long periods.

Of those villages in England that still have shops, these days they are often a combination of services under one roof to increase the likelihood of profit and survival. Extra services may include a post office, private business services such as tearooms, cafes, and bed and breakfast accommodation; or state services such as libraries and General Practitioner (GP) or Dental clinics; and charity partners such as Women's Institute (WI) coffee mornings held on the day most elderly villagers might collect their weekly pensions.

Community shops have become popular in some villages, often jointly owned and run by many villagers as a co-operative. The Village Retail Services Association promotes the role and function of the village shop in the UK. Many modern village shops choose to stock items which draw in customers from neighboring areas who are seeking locally sourced, organic and specialist produce such as local cuts of meat, local cheeses, wines etc.

Corner shops are usually so-called because they are located on the corner plot or street end of a row of terraced housing, often Victorian or Edwardian factory workers' houses. The doorway into the shop was usually on the corner of the plot to maximize shop floor space within, this also offered two display windows onto two opposing streets. Many have now altered the original shop front layout in favor of a mini-supermarket style. Although it is common that corner shops found in the UK were former grocers' shops, other specialist retailers also occupied such plots and have suffered the same fate of being largely replaced by supermarkets and hypermarkets, such retailers as greengrocers, bakers, butchers and fishmongers.

==== In popular culture ====
Many British television and radio series, especially soap operas, feature corner shops or village shops as cornerstones for community gatherings and happenings. A prominent example is the village shop in Ambridge, the fictional village in the BBC Radio 4 series, The Archers, (1950–present). The ITV1 soap opera Coronation Street (1960–present) has featured a corner shop since the first episode; originally owned by Florrie Lindley, it was later acquired by Alf Roberts the grocer, and after his death in the late-1990s was bought by Dev Alahan, reflecting this common change in British culture to Asian shopkeepers. The dying days and changing culture of the traditional British grocer were explored to great effect in the BBC TV comedy series Open All Hours (1976–1985), set in the real suburb of Balby in Doncaster; the shop front used for the street scenes in the series does actually exist in the area and is now a hairdressing salon. The BBC Scotland comedy series Still Game has a corner shop as a recurring location where characters can meet and gossip; the actor who plays its owner, Navid Harrid (Sanjeev Kohli), plays a similar role as Bangaram in the Radio 4 comedy series Fags, Mags and Bags which is set entirely in Ramesh's shop.

The band Cornershop in part base their image on the perception that many convenience shops are now owned by British Asian people. In terms of British popular culture, these media representations give some idea of the importance attached to local shops in the national psyche and as a mainstay of community life.

=== United States ===
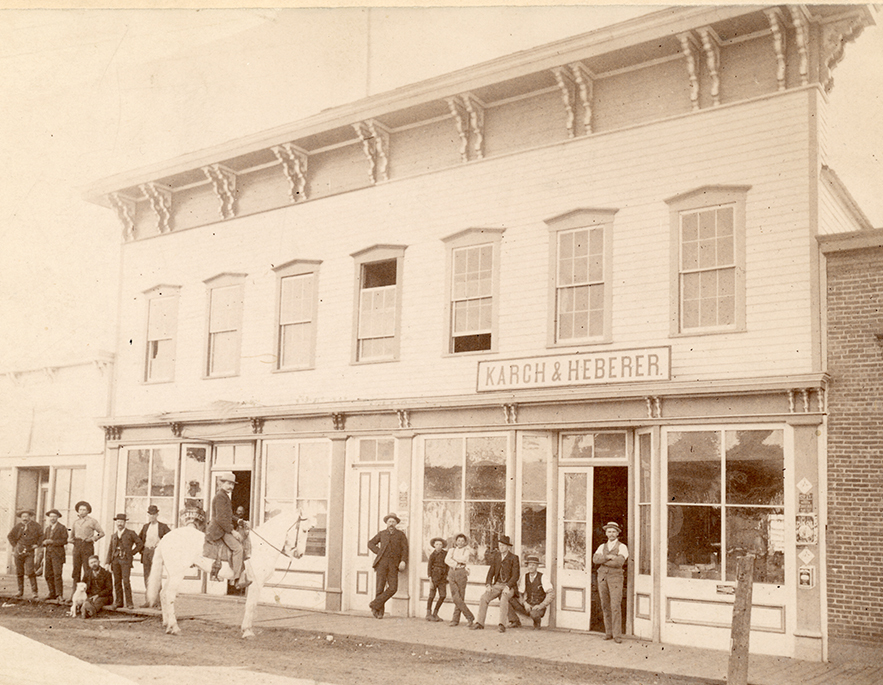
Karch & Heberer General Store in Fairplay, Colorado, late 1800s

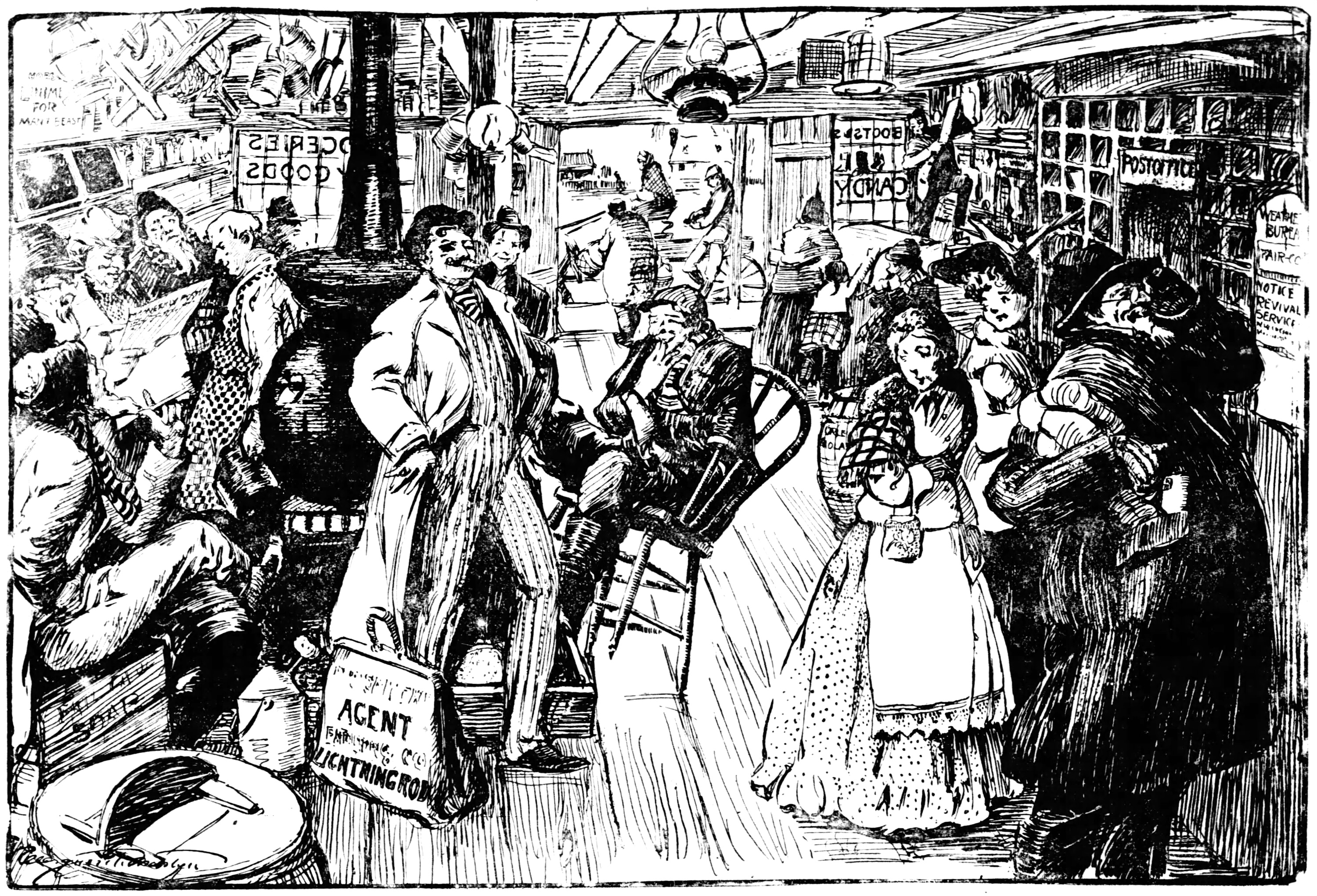
Fanciful drawing by Marguerite Martyn in the St. Louis Post-Dispatch of October 21, 1906, headed "Passing of the Country Store in the Southwest"

General stores and itinerant peddlers dominated in rural America until the coming of the automobile after 1910. Farmers and ranchers depended on general stores that had a limited stock and slow turnover; they made enough profit to stay in operation by selling at high prices. Often farmers would barter butter, cheese, eggs, vegetables or other foods which the merchant would resell. Prices were not marked on each item; instead the customer negotiated a price. Men did most of the shopping, since the main criterion was credit rather than quality of goods. Indeed, most customers shopped on credit, paying later when crops or cattle were sold; the owner's ability to judge credit worthiness was vital to his success. The store was often a gathering point for local men to chat, pass around the weekly newspaper, and talk politics.

In the South, the general store was especially important after the Civil War, as the merchant was one of the few sources of credit available until the cash crops (usually cotton or tobacco) came in. By 1878, for example, there were 1,468 local merchants in Alabama, or 12 for every 10,000 people. There were few towns and very few cities, so rural general stores and itinerant peddlers were the main sources of supply.

During the first half of the 20th century, general stores were displaced in many areas of the United States by many different types of specialized retailers in trading towns and small cities. However, from the 1960s to the present, many small specialized retailers have in turn been crushed by the so-called "category killers", which are big-box wholesale-type retailers large enough to carry the majority of best-selling goods in a specific category, like sporting goods or office supplies. Gray's General Store of Adamsville, Rhode Island is reputed to be the oldest continually operating general store in the United States until its temporary closure in 2012. It subsequently reopened in the summer of 2013.

However, the convenience inherent in the general store has been revived in the form of the modern convenience store. A few variety stores draw upon the concept of having a broad variety of goods servicing small communities where big-box retailers are absent; Dollar General stores, in particular, draws its name from both the "dollar store" concept of having items at a fixed price point and the general store.

==== List of general stores ====
This is a select list of historical general stores in the United States, listed in alphabetical order.

- A. D. Strickland Store (c.1878–1972), Dalton, Georgia
- Barker General Store (c. 1847–?), Beecher Hollow, Saratoga County, New York
- E. J. Caire Store (1860–mid-1970s), Edgard, Louisiana
- Felt Cobblestone General Store (1835–?), Victor, New York
- F. H. Gillingham & Sons (1886–Present), Woodstock, Vermont
- Gray's General Store (1788–2012), Adamsville, Rhode Island
- Harkin's General Store (1867–1901), West Newton, Minnesota
- Hussey's General Store (1923–1954), Windsor, Maine
- Jorgensen's General Store, Grant-Valkaria, Florida
- Lost River General Store (1898–?), Lost River, Hardy County, West Virginia
- Manion's General Store (before 1908–1970s), Ferndale, Sullivan County, New York
- Mast General Store (1887–?), Valle Crucis, North Carolina
- McClellan's General Store, New London, Iowa
- Mikulich General Store, Traunik, Michigan
- Ruddell General Store, Glenville, West Virginia
- Simons General Store, Ancram, New York
- Saint James General Store, Saint James, New York
- Tioga Centre General Store, Tioga, New York
- Vorous General Store, Fish Creek, Wisconsin
- Welty's General Store, Dubois, Wyoming
United States general stores

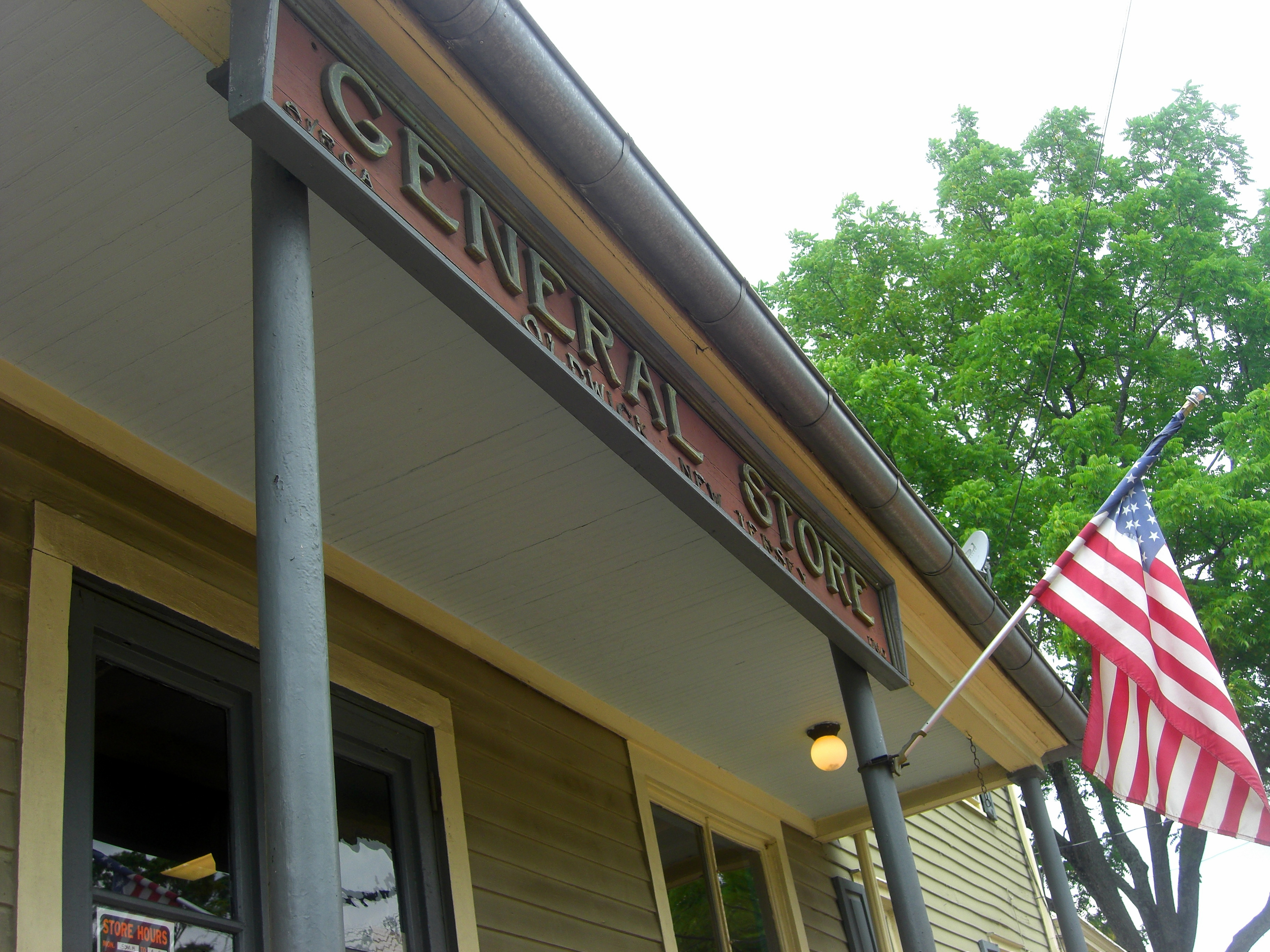
The Oldwick General Store in Tewksbury Township, New Jersey

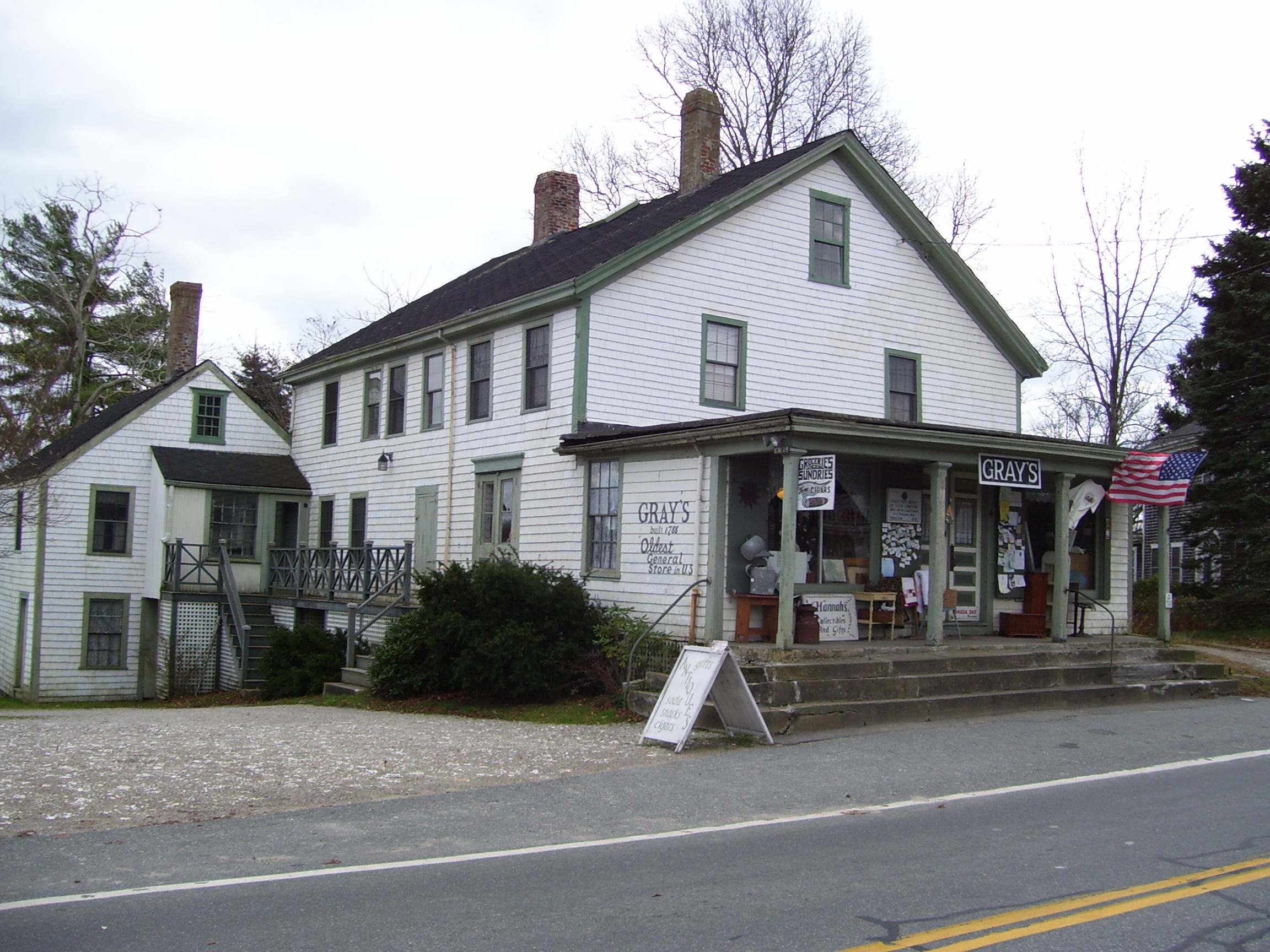
The Grays General Store (1788) in Adamsville, Rhode Island

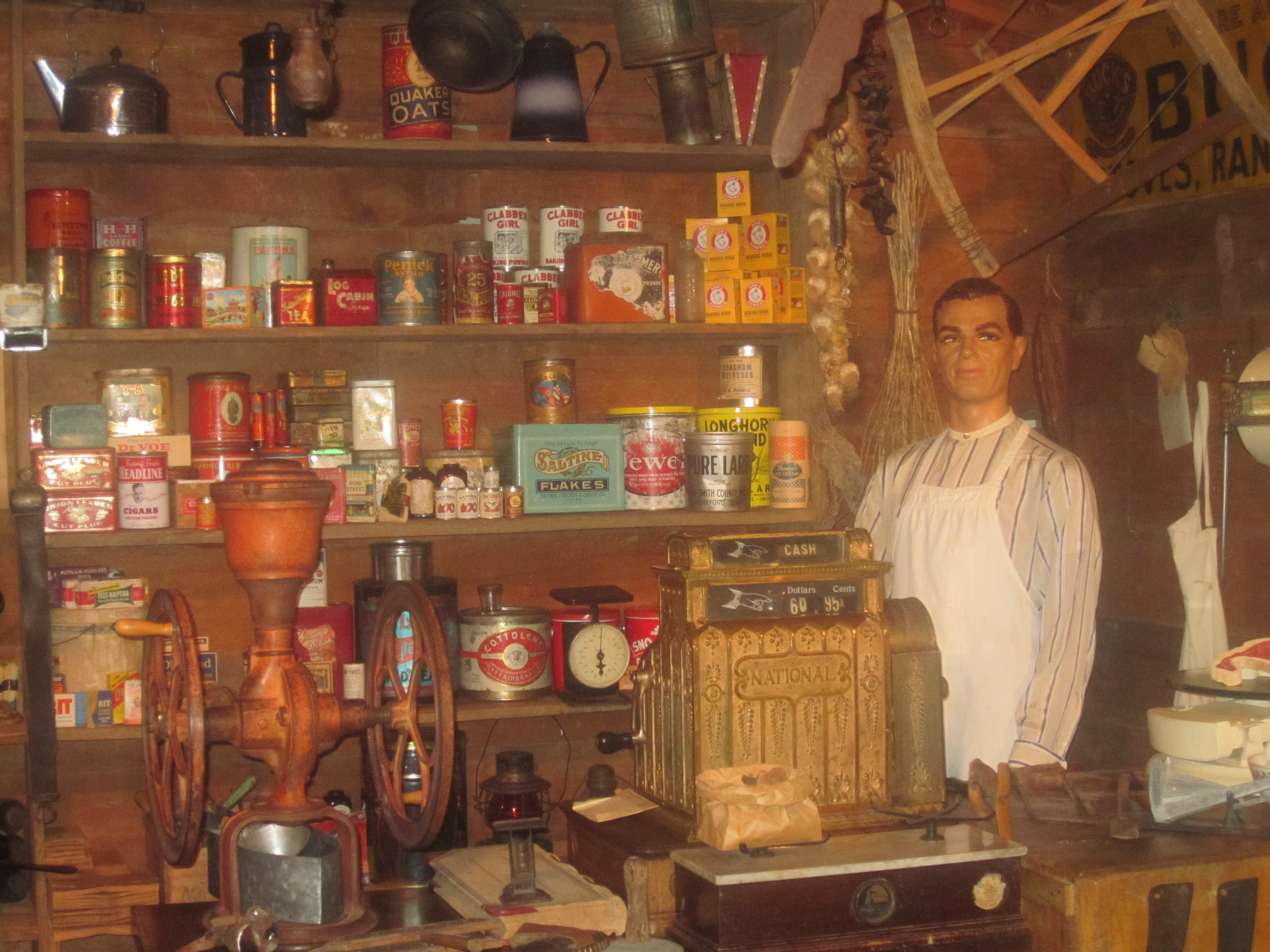
General store exhibit at the Deaf Smith County Historical Museum in Hereford, Texas

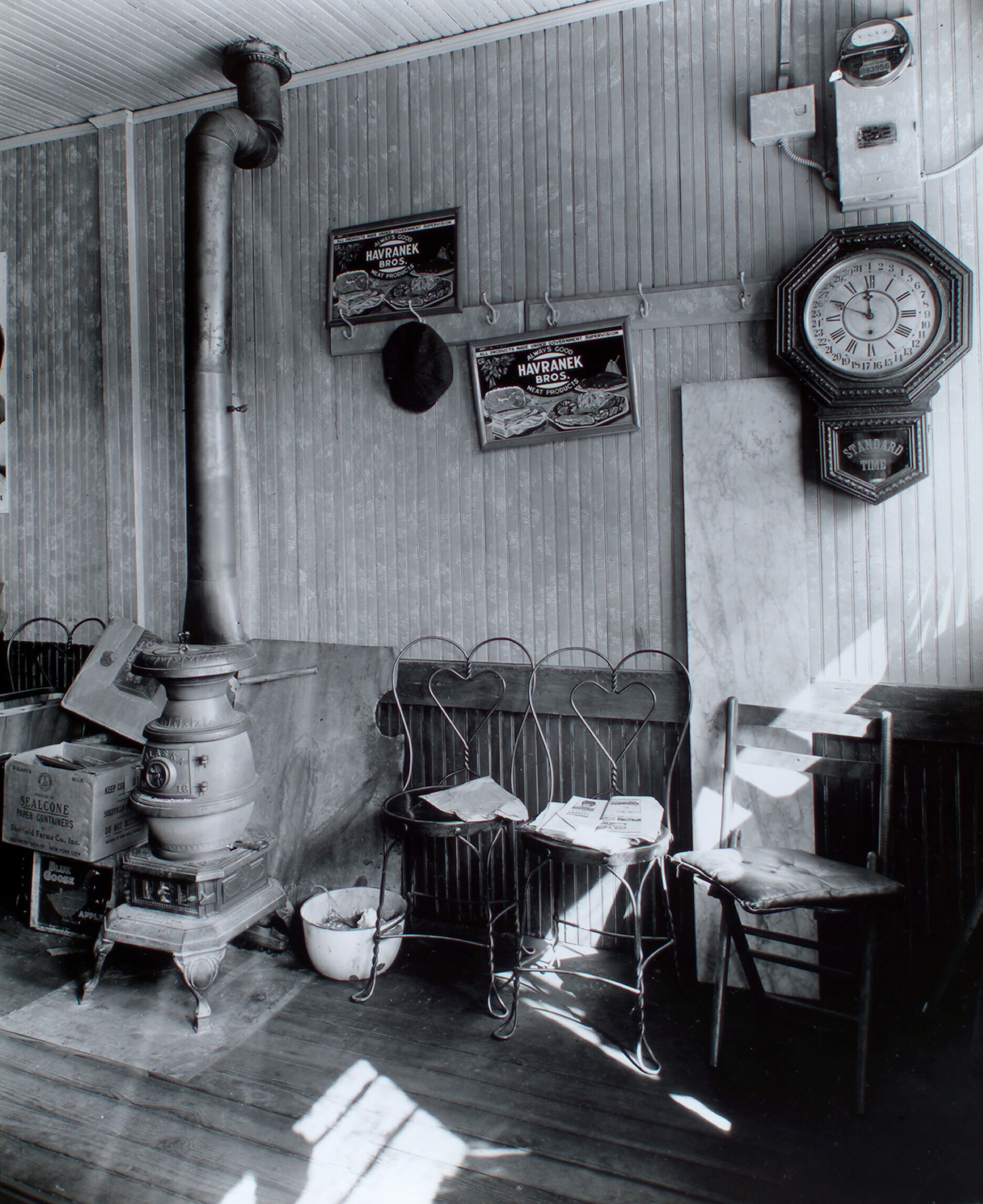
Country Store, Spuyten Duyvil, Bronx, early 20th century

== See also ==
- Department store
- Hyper market
- Types of retail outlets
- Super market
- Super store
