= Hussey's General Store =

Coordinates: 44.3104°N 69.5813°W

Hussey's General Store

Hussey's General Store claims to be the largest general store in the state of Maine. It was founded in 1923 and moved to its present location in 1954.

The slogan for "Hussey's General Store" is, "if we ain't got it, you don't need it". Hussey's has a large amount of merchandise including guns, wedding gowns, and cold beer, as is stated by a sign outside the store. The building is located at the intersection of Routes 32 and 105 in Windsor. The store also operates as an Ace Hardware franchisee.
