= Malta War =

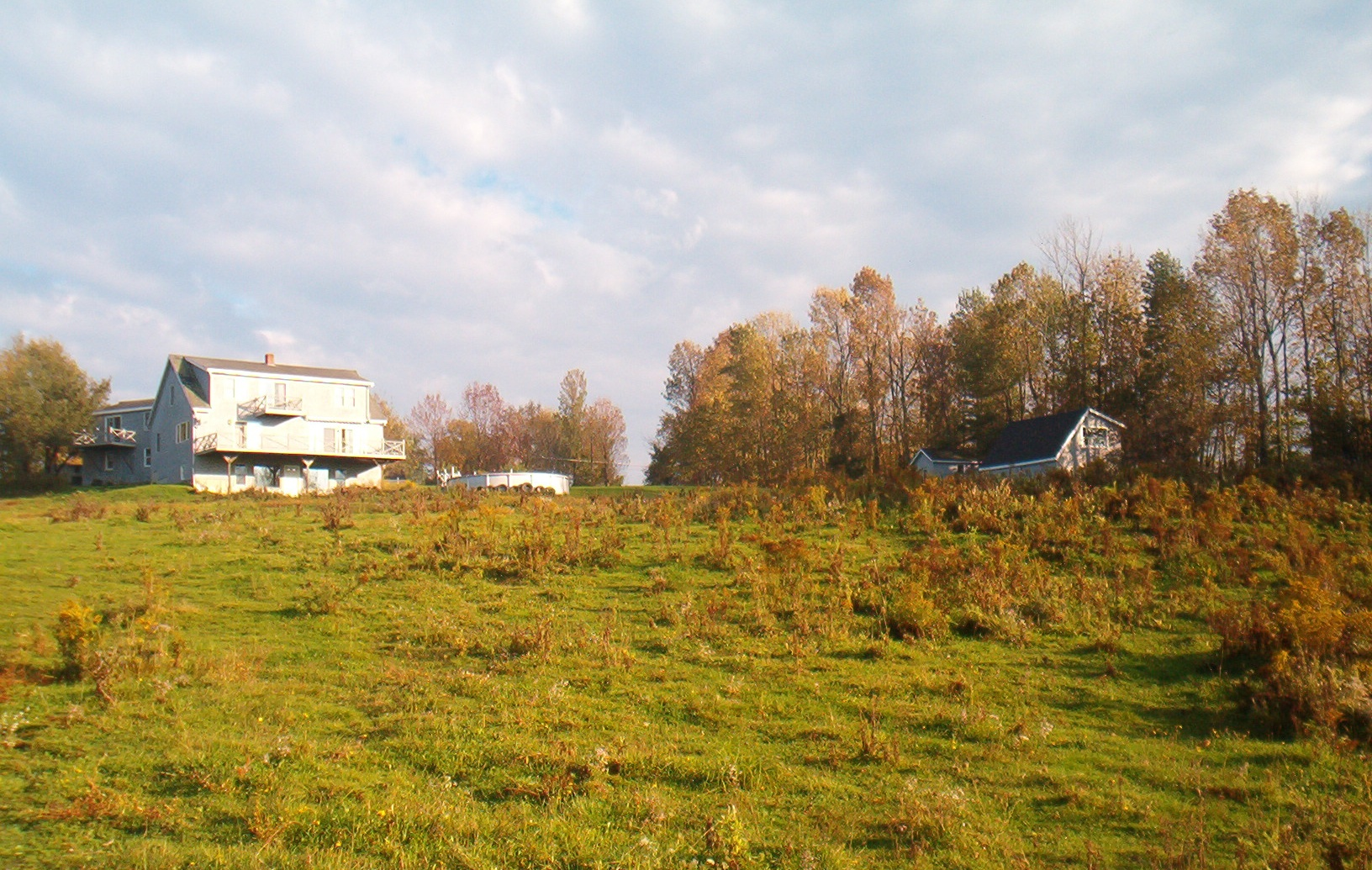
Some farmland in Windsor, Maine where the Malta War took place.

The Malta War was a local conflict over land titles in what is now the state of Maine, reaching its peak in 1808 and 1809. The episode was near the town of Malta, now Windsor, Maine.

Squatters had been clearing trees on land owned by an outside company. From time to time these men were arrested for trespass. In retaliation Paul Chadwick, a surveyor, was murdered in 1809. Seven of the squatters were arrested and held in the Malta jail. Seventy men descended on the jail, but Governor Levi Lincoln Sr. sent in militia from nearby towns to defend the jail and its prisoners. There was no military confrontation but there were many rumors and the soldiers stayed on, at a cost of $11,000 to the state. After six weeks, the defendants were found not guilty at their trial and the episode ended.

== See also ==
- Federal Writers' Project. Maine – A Guide 'Down East (1940) p 72
