= Windsor, Maine =

Town in Maine, United States

- Town
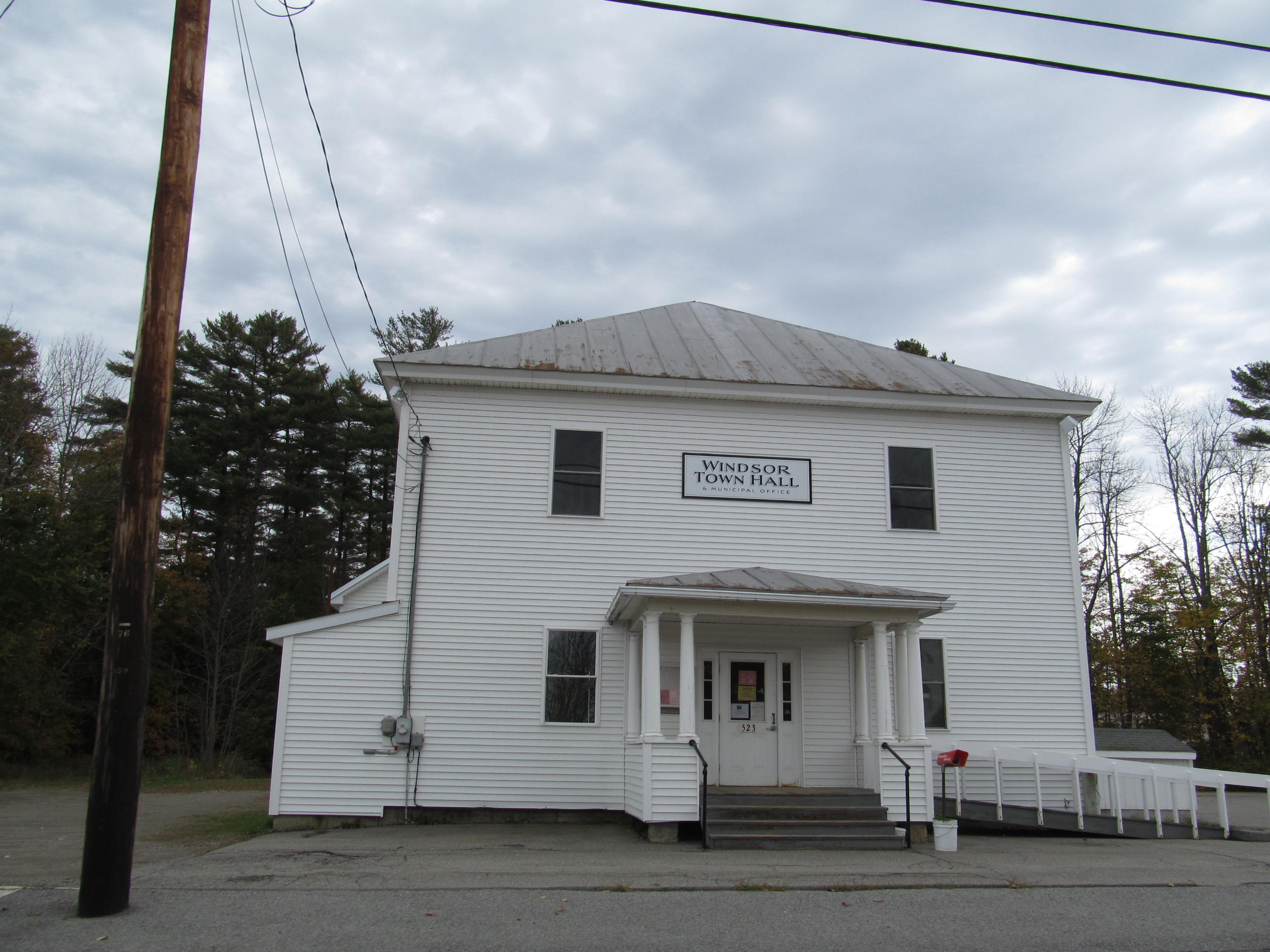
- Town Hall

- Seal

- Location in Kennebec County and the state of Maine.
- Coordinates: 44°18′29″N 69°36′18″W
- Country: United States
- State: Maine
- County: Kennebec
- Villages: Windsor; Halls Corner; North Windsor; South Windsor; West Windsor; Windsor Station; Windsorville

Area
  - Total: 35.52 sq mi (92.00 km^{2})
  - Land: 34.65 sq mi (89.74 km^{2})
  - Water: 0.87 sq mi (2.25 km^{2})
- Elevation: 262 ft (80 m)

Population (2020)
  - Total: 2,632
  - Density: 76/sq mi (29.3/km^{2})
- Time zone: UTC-5 (Eastern (EST))
  - Summer (DST): UTC-4 (EDT)
- ZIP code: 04363
- Area code: 207
- FIPS code: 23-86165
- GNIS feature ID: 582818
- Website: windsor.maine.gov

Windsor is a town in Kennebec County, Maine, United States. The population was 2,632 at the 2020 census. Windsor is included in the Augusta, Maine, micropolitan New England City and Town Area.

== History ==
The territory was first incorporated March 3, 1809, under the name of "Malta." Shortly after, a minor rebellion called the "Malta War" broke out against the Massachusetts state government in Boston over settlement and land ownership rights. In 1820, the town was reincorporated under the name "Gerry" to honor the late statesman and Vice President Elbridge Gerry. Two years after that, the town was renamed Windsor in its final reincorporation.

== Geography ==
The first annual Windsor Day's parade.

According to the United States Census Bureau, the town has a total area of 35.52 square miles (92.00 km^{2}), of which 34.65 square miles (89.74 km^{2}) is land and 0.87 square miles (2.25 km^{2}) is water.

== Demographics ==
Historical population
Census	Pop.	Note	%±
1810	468		—
1820	1,054		125.2%
1830	1,485		40.9%
1840	1,789		20.5%
1850	1,793		0.2%
1860	1,548		−13.7%
1870	1,266		−18.2%
1880	1,079		−14.8%
1890	853		−20.9%
1900	782		−8.3%
1910	706		−9.7%
1920	599		−15.2%
1930	565		−5.7%
1940	695		23.0%
1950	740		6.5%
1960	878		18.6%
1970	1,097		24.9%
1980	1,702		55.2%
1990	1,895		11.3%
2000	2,204		16.3%
2010	2,575		16.8%
2020	2,632		2.2%
U.S. Decennial Census

=== 2010 census ===
As of the census of 2010, there were 2,575 people, 1,039 households, and 721 families living in the town. The population density was 74.3 inhabitants per square mile (28.7/km^{2}). There were 1,152 housing units at an average density of 33.2 per square mile (12.8/km^{2}). The racial makeup of the town was 97.0% White; 0.4% African American; 0.7% Native American; 0.3% Asian; 0.2% from other races; and 1.4% from two or more races. Hispanic or Latino of any race were 0.8% of the population.

There were 1,039 households, of which 32.2% had children under the age of 18 living with them; 52.9% were married couples living together; 10.3% had a female householder with no husband present; 6.2% had a male householder with no wife present; and 30.6% were non-families. 21.5% of all households were made up of individuals, and 7.3% had someone living alone who was 65 years of age or older. The average household size was 2.48 and the average family size was 2.87.

The median age in the town was 42.1 years. 22.3% of residents were under the age of 18; 7.7% were between the ages of 18 and 24; 25.4% were from 25 to 44; 31.5% were from 45 to 64; and 13.2% were 65 years of age or older. The gender makeup of the town was 49.5% male and 50.5% female.

=== 2000 census ===
As of the census of 2000, there were 2,204 people, 846 households, and 620 families living in the town. The population density was 63.6 inhabitants per square mile (24.6/km^{2}). There were 952 housing units at an average density of 27.5 per square mile (10.6/km^{2}). The racial makeup of the town was 98.46% White; 0.27% African American; 0.32% Native American; 0.09% Asian; 0.14% from other races; and 0.73% from two or more races. Hispanic or Latino of any race were 0.54% of the population.

There were 846 households, out of which 36.2% had children under the age of 18 living with them, 60.0% were married couples living together; 9.0% had a female householder with no husband present; and 26.7% were non-families. 19.1% of all households were made up of individuals, and 7.1% had someone living alone who was 65 years of age or older. The average household size was 2.61 and the average family size was 2.97.

In the town, the population was spread out, with 26.5% under the age of 18; 6.3% from 18 to 24; 32.2% from 25 to 44; 24.3% from 45 to 64; and 10.7% who were 65 years of age or older. The median age was 36 years. For every 100 females, there were 92.8 males. For every 100 females age 18 and over, there were 94.6 males.

The median income for a household in the town was $40,039, and the median income for a family was $43,792. Males had a median income of $31,146 versus $24,194 for females. The per capita income for the town was $16,746. About 5.5% of families and 9.5% of the population were below the poverty line, including 13.3% of those under age 18 and 11.2% of those age 65 or over.

== Point of interest ==
- Hussey's General Store
