= Gray's General Store =

General store in Rhode Island, U.S., 1788–2012

Coordinates: 41.554371°N 71.126994°W

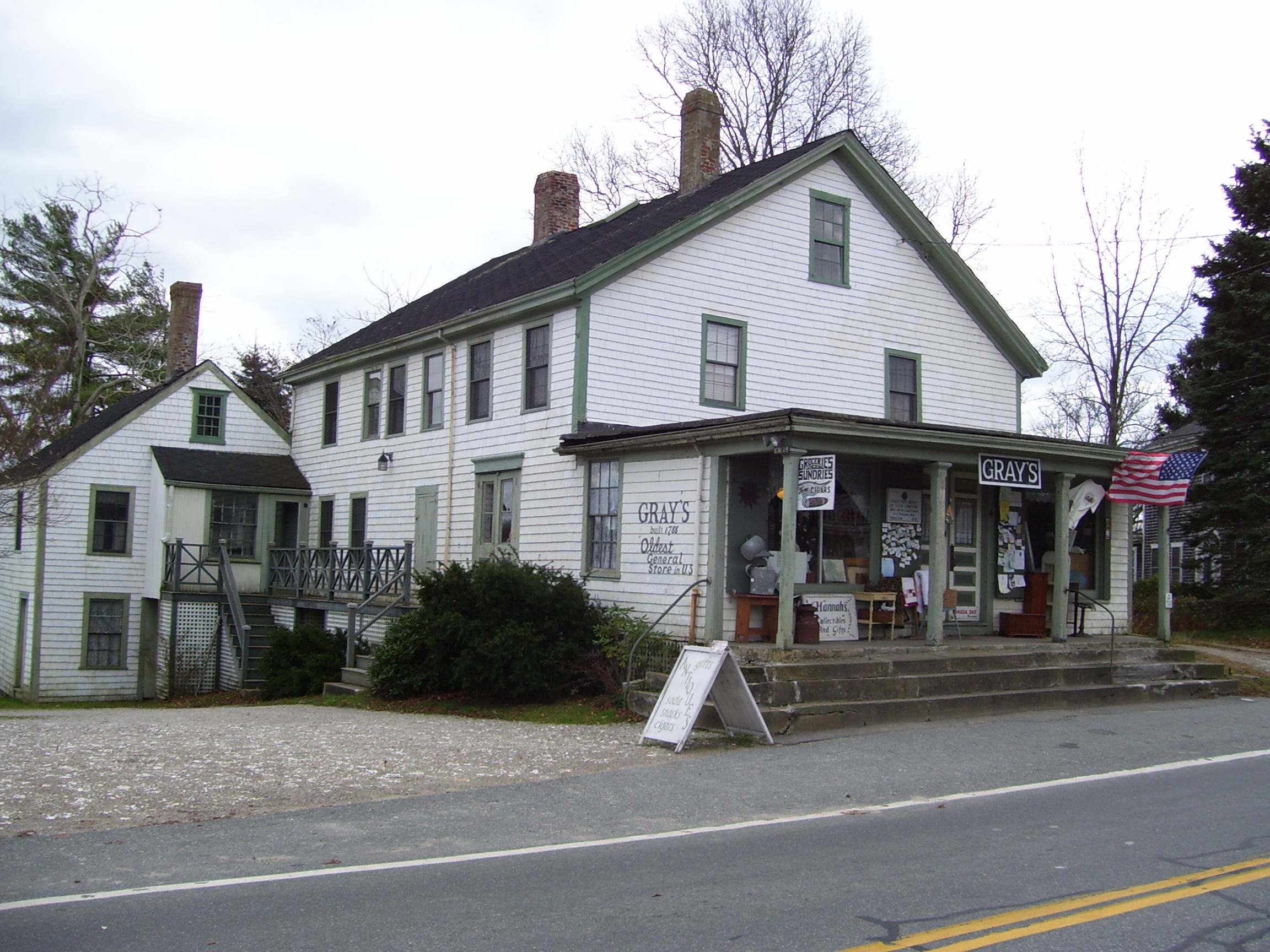
Gray's General Store in 2008.

Gray's General Store was a general store located at 4 Main Street in Adamsville, Rhode Island. Founded in 1788, it operated for almost 225 years and was reputed to be the oldest continually operating general store in the United States.

The store featured an old-fashioned marble soda fountain, cigar and tobacco cases, and Rhode Island johnnycakes. In 2007, U.S. Senator Jack Reed and then-Governor Donald Carcieri issued proclamations naming Gray's as the oldest continuously run general store in the country. The store was owned and operated by the same family since 1879, entailing seven generations. Gray's also was the location of the first post office in Little Compton, founded in 1804.

Gray's temporarily closed on Sunday, July 29, 2012, after the death of its proprietor and lack of interest in keeping the store open by relatives, citing that "the shop's finances aren't sustainable and a supermarket down the street has siphoned away business."

The store re-opened in the summer of 2013. However, the store subsequently closed, and, as of 2025, remains closed.
