= Adamsville, Rhode Island =

Village in Little Compton, Rhode Island, US

Coordinates: 41°33′16″N 71°07′52″W

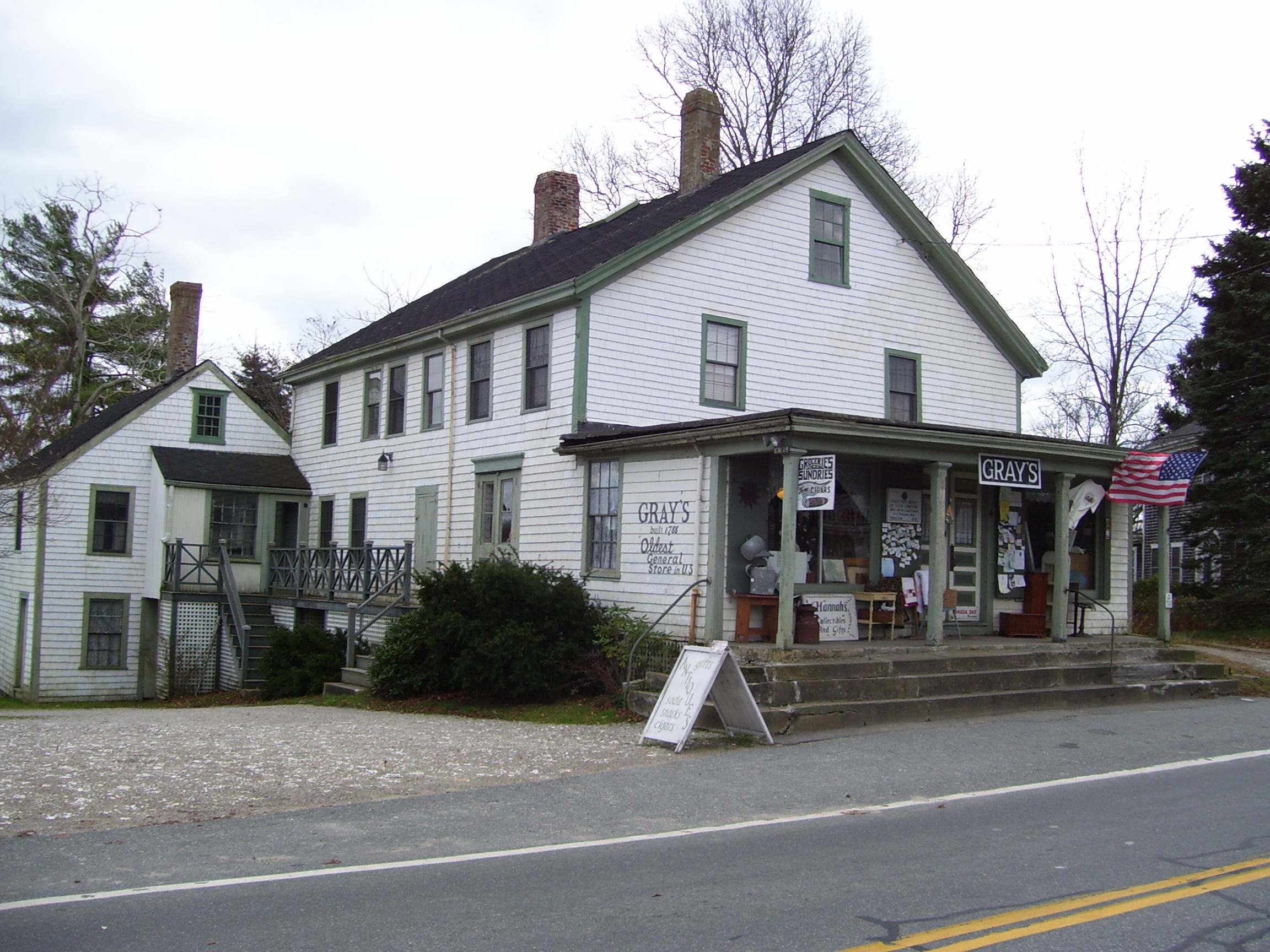
Grays General Store, founded in 1788, was allegedly the oldest operating general store in the United States.

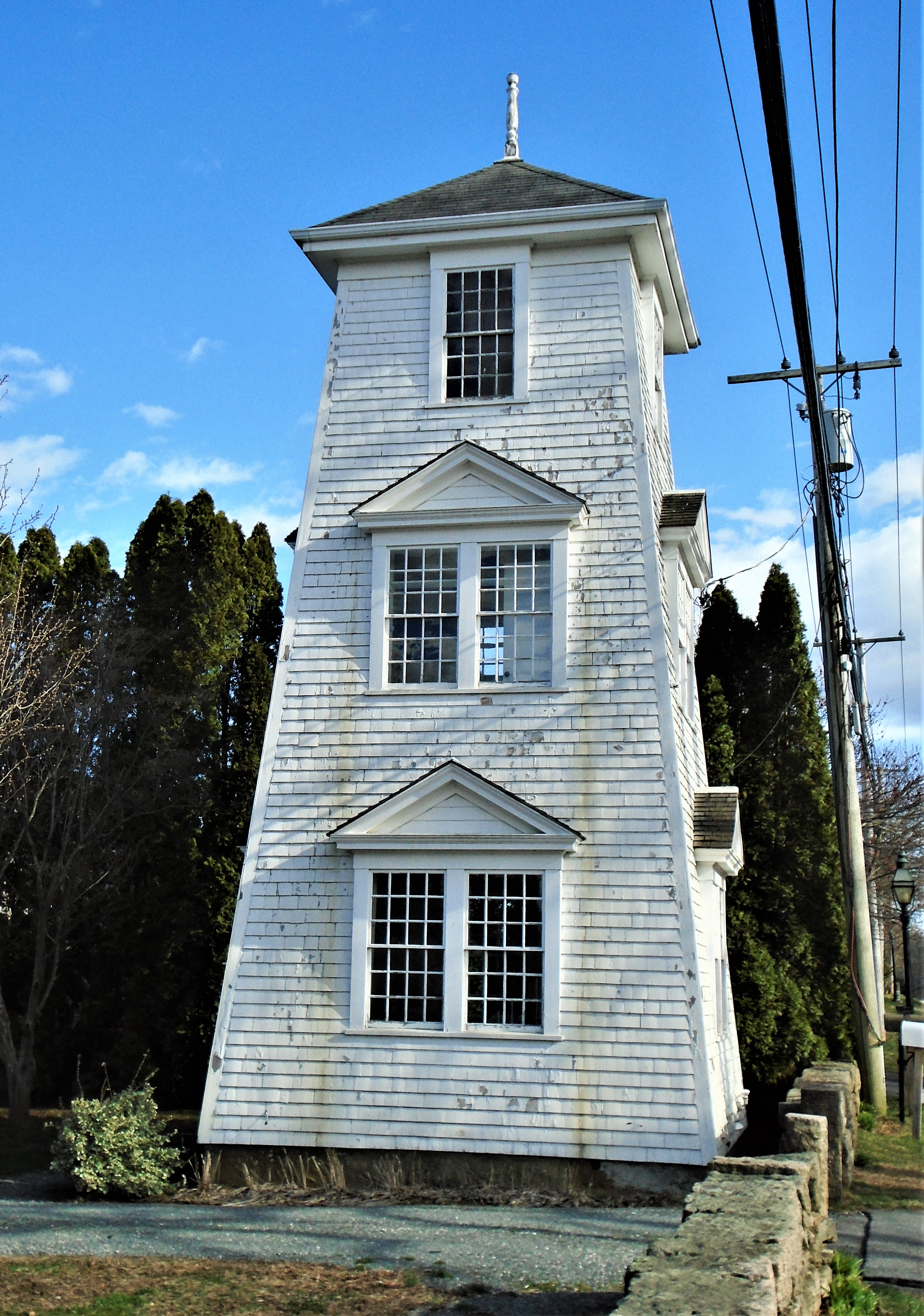
The "Spite Tower."

Adamsville is a historic village in Little Compton, Rhode Island, United States. It was first settled in 1675 around the time of King Philip's War and was named after the second president of the United States, John Adams.

== Historic sites ==
Grays General Store in Adamsville was built in 1788. It was allegedly the oldest operating general store in the United States until it temporarily closed in 2012, and was home to the town's first post office, founded in 1804. The store was most recently operated by Grayton Waite, a sixth-generation shop keeper, along with his son Jonah Waite. The store was reopened in 2013.

The nearby Rhode Island Red Monument, built in 1925, at the intersection of Adamsville Road, Westport Harbor Road and Main Street is a granite monument to the Rhode Island Red Chicken, the official state bird. This landmark was placed in Adamsville because of convenience – land had been donated on this corner, for the purpose of erecting the monument. The Rhode Island Red was actually originally bred closer to West Main Road, outside of the Village of Adamsville. Across from the monument is the popular breakfast restaurant called The Barn, which opened in 1987.

Another distinctive feature of the town is the "Spite Tower" found in the village. Local lore claims that the tower was constructed to obscure the line of sight of a town local. While most stories involve members of the local Manchester family, there is no consensus as to the true history of the structure. According to the previous owner of the building, the "Spite Tower" was built above an artesian well. There was a pump that brought the water to a holding tank on the third floor that sent water, via gravity feed, to main house's water tank to provide running water. The building was constructed circa 1905. The chauffeur's residence was on the second floor of the tower.
